= 2025 Malaysian judicial appointment controversy =

Controversy over Malaysia's judiciary

The 2025 Malaysian judicial appointment controversy was a controversy surrounding the appointment of a new Chief Justice of Malaysia and a new President of the Court of Appeal, following the mandatory retirement of Tengku Maimun Tuan Mat and Abang Iskandar Abang Hashim respectively in early July 2025.

The controversy also centred around a leaked meeting minute purportedly to be originated from the Judicial Appointments Commission (JAC), which alleged that Ahmad Terrirudin Mohd Salleh, former Attorney General of Malaysia and a sitting Federal Court judge since November 2024, had interfered in judicial matters and lacks qualification to be appointed as the Chief Judge of the High Court in Malaya.

Under the Malaysian Constitution, chief justice is appointed by the King on the advice of the prime minister, after His Majesty consulted with the Conference of Rulers. For positions other than chief justice, the prime minister is also required to consult with the chief justice or other senior judges in advance before tendering his advice to the King. Additionally, in order to be qualified for appointment as a judge to the High Court, Court of Appeal or Federal Court, one must be a Malaysian citizen and has at least 10 years legal experience.

In 2009, following the 2007 VK Lingam tape scandal, the JAC was established under the Judicial Appointments Commission Act [Act 695] to select, assess, screen and recommend potential candidates that will be appointed to the three superior courts. JAC's recommended candidates were then submitted to the prime minister for his consideration, before he tender his advice to the King. However, JAC's recommendations are not legally binding on the prime minister or the King, who have the final say on judicial appointments.

The controversy is generally considered to has ended in late July 2025, with the appointments of Wan Ahmad Farid Wan Salleh as the new Chief Justice; Abu Bakar Jais as the new President of Court of Appeal; Azizah Nawawi as the new Chief Judge of the High Court in Sabah and Sarawak; and other new Court of Appeal judges and High Court judges. Meanwhile, Ahmad Terrirudin was not elevated to any higher position as previously speculated.

== Background ==
=== Terrirudin's rise to federal judge ===
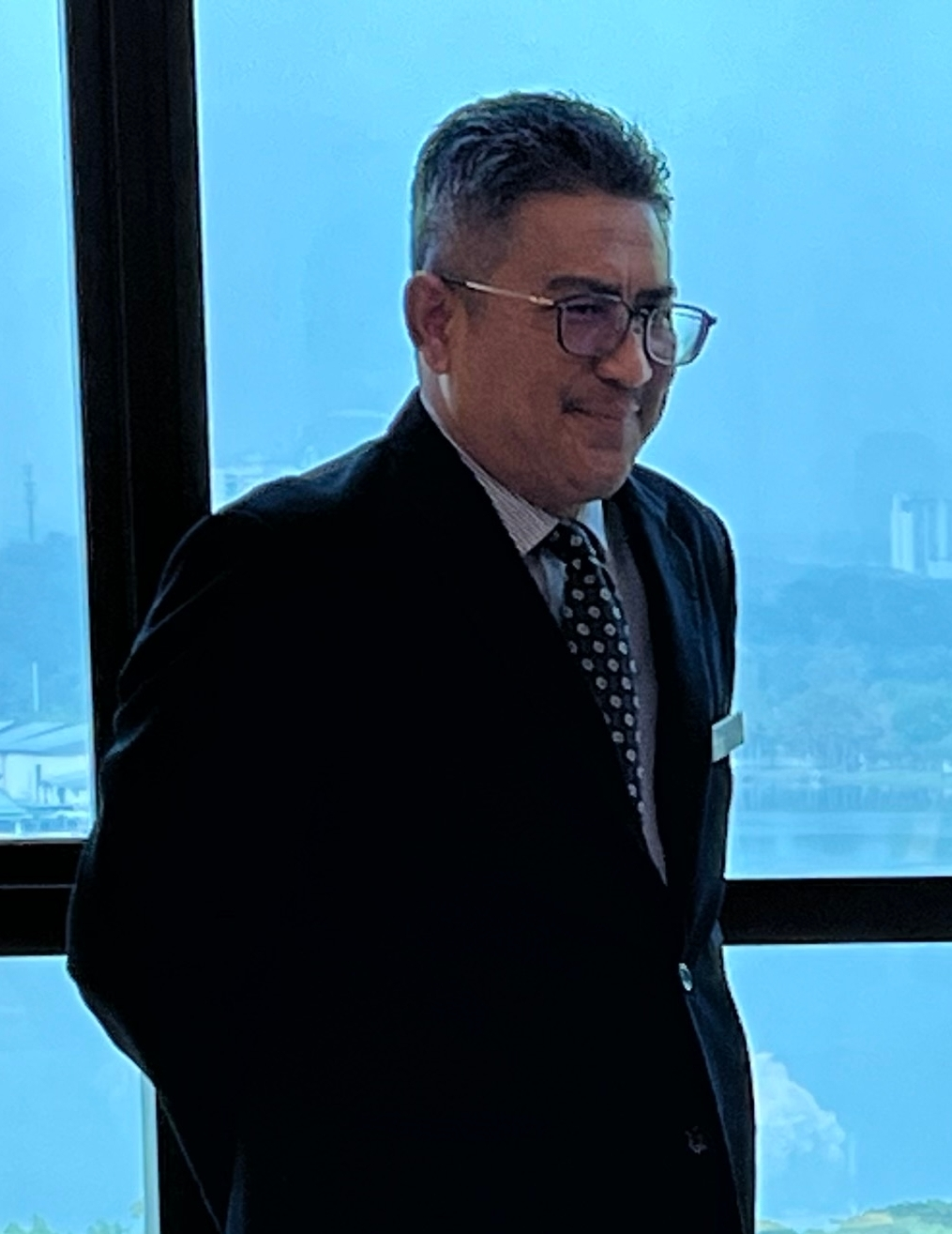
Terrirudin Salleh when he was serving as the attorney general of Malaysia in 2023.

As early as June 2024, rumours of attorney general Ahmad Terrirudin Mohd Salleh will be appointed to the post of Federal Court judge and eventually the Chief Judge of Malaya began circulating. Several lawyers and one government backbencher, Ramkarpal Singh, have expressed concerns over Terrirudin's possible appointment as Chief Judge of Malaya, despite there are federal judges who are more senior and more qualifying than Terrirudin.

On 1 August 2024, MalaysiaNow reported that, according to its "reliable sources", Terrirudin was not among those recommended by chief justice Tengku Maimun to prime minister Anwar Ibrahim to be appointed as Chief Judge of Malaya.

On 12 November 2024, however, Terrirudin was appointed as a Federal Court judge, while Hasnah Mohammed Hashim was appointed to the post of Chief Judge of Malaya instead.

=== Tengku Maimun's speech in Malta ===
On 4 April 2025, Tengku Maimun as the sitting Chief Justice of Malaysia, attended the 24th Commonwealth Law Conference held in Malta and delivered a speech titled "Judicial Independence and Parliamentary Sovereignty - A Colossi of Roads?". In the speech, she outlined the history of judicial independence in Malaysia and how the 1988 constitutional crisis has affected public confidence towards Malaysia's judiciary. She also emphasised that neither the legislature or judiciary is supreme as only the constitution reign supreme in Malaysia, and it is the judiciary's duty to upheld the constitution. At one point of her speech, she advocated for the removal of prime minister's involvement in judges' appointment so that the appointment process will be free from perception of political influence.

One politician, Nazri Aziz, would later claimed this speech caused her to not be given a 6-month extension on her Chief Justice position when she reached her mandatory retirement age on 2 July 2025.

=== JAC meeting (May 2025) ===
On 13 June 2025, MalaysiaNow reported that Terrirudin Salleh is one of two candidates being considered by the JAC for nomination as the new Chief Judge of Malaya, a post which is usually a stepping stone to become the chief justice. Another candidate that is being considered is Vazeer Alam Mydin Meera, who has been serving as a judge in various courts in 2010 and has written over 30 pieces grounds of judgement. Sources told the news portal that Vazeer Alam is most likely to be nominated as his seniority and experience superseded that of Terrirudin, who has only produced one written judgement so far.

On 24 June 2025, a police report allegedly made by the staff of an unnamed senior judge was leaked through WhatsApp. The police report was made after the said judge was contacted by MalaysiaKini on 12 June for his comment over certain allegations levelled against him during "an important meeting". Two MalaysiaKini journalists were later questioned by the police.

On the same day, Free Malaysia Today reported that according to its source and the leaked police report, the senior judge was summoned for questioning before a JAC meeting held on 16 May over allegations of interference in judicial appointments, which resulted in a heated discussion and a split within the JAC. CNA later confirmed the senior judge in question is Terrirudin Salleh.

== Judicial vacancies ==
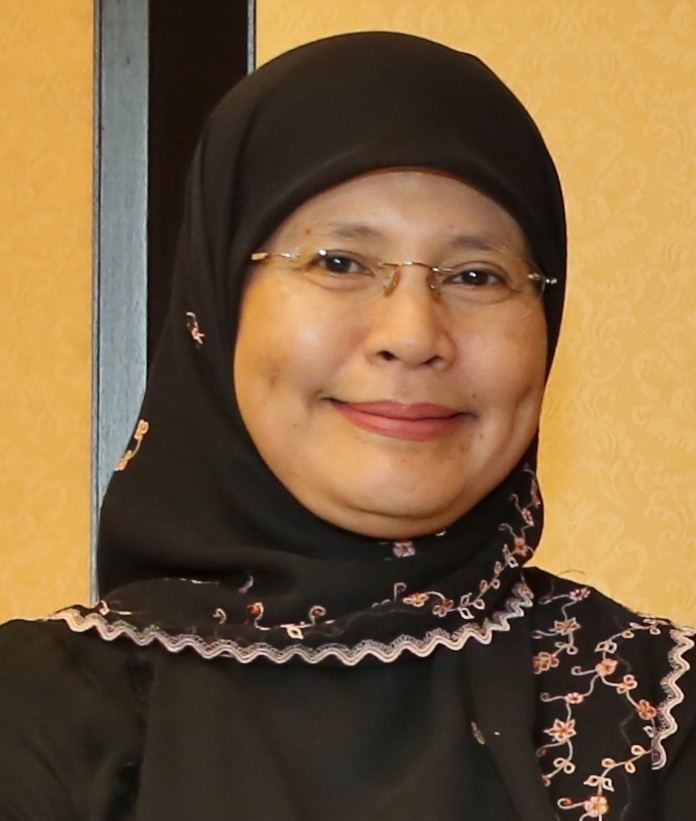
Tengku Maimun Tuan Mat, who retired on 2 July 2025.

On 2 July 2025, Tengku Maimun officially retired from the post of Chief Justice of Malaysia as she reached her mandatory retirement age of 66 and was not granted a six months extension. Abang Iskandar Abang Hashim also similarly retired from the post of President of the Court of Appeal a day later with no extension of tenure given. Abdul Rahman Sebli who is holding the position of Chief Judge of Sabah and Sarawak is also set to retire on 25 July, after his six-month extension expires.

On 3 July, Chief Judge of Malaya Hasnah Mohammed Hashim assumed the position of chief justice in acting capacity, while federal judge Zabariah Mohd Yusof was appointed as the acting president of the Court of Appeal. However, both Hasnah and Zabariah are also set to retire on 15 November and 10 October this year respectively, after their six-month extension ends.

Several other Federal Court judges are set to retire in the upcoming months as well. Nallini Pathmanathan, who was not offered a six-month extension, will retire on 22 August; while Hanipah Farikullah will retire on 22 November after her six-month extension lapses.

According to former economy minister and PKR member Rafizi Ramli, if no new judges were appointed to fill the vacancies, the retirement of the seven aforementioned judges will result in more than half of the Federal Court bench left vacant by the end of 2025. Other than that, as of 14 July 2025, there are over 30 benches remained vacant in the superior courts, 24 of which are in the High Court, 3 in the Court of Appeal, and 2 in the Federal Court.

=== Criticism ===
Critics consisting of lawyers and politicians have condemned the government, particularly prime minister Anwar Ibrahim, for not granting an extension to the two top judges, despite concerns have been raised over the upcoming vacancies weeks prior to their retirement.

Among the concerns raised are disruption in ongoing high-profile cases and loss of public confidence in judicial independence. Malaysian Bar president Ezri Abdul Wahab has described the government's silence and indecision as "indefensible", while Rafizi Ramli implied there may be plan to bypass the existing seniority hierarchy among the judges and appoint Terrirudin Salleh to the top judicial position. Kuala Lumpur Bar also estimated there are approximately 20% judicial vacancy in Kuala Lumpur High Court alone, which have resulted in cases being stalled or have trials being pushed into 2027 and beyond.

In response, Anwar Ibrahim on 30 June stated that he never interfere the judiciary and the issues has been politicised. He reiterated that service extension is not automatically granted and there are constitutional procedures that must be followed when appointing a judge to the superior court.

== Rafizi's press conference ==
On 7 July, Rafizi Ramli together with eight other PKR backbenchers held a press conference and issued a joint statement, which criticised the government for not acting swiftly to appoint new judges based on the recommendations submmited by the JAC, leading to vacancies in the top courts. They also questioned the validity of an urgent JAC meeting held by acting chief justice Hasnah Mohammed Hashim on 4 July, as it was called without a 10-day prior notice, a requirement under the JAC Act. The group also brought up the issue of a police report which allegedly shown a federal judge was questioned over allegations of judicial interference, drawing comparisons with the VK Lingam tape scandal.

Therefore, the nine persons group called for a royal commission of inquiry (RCI) to be set up to investigate the matter. They also requested for the Parliamentary Special Select Committee on Human Rights, Election and Institutional Reform to conduct investigative proceedings over the matter, including summoning prime minister Anwar Ibrahim to testify. The group also announced they will launch nationwide forums and online petition to garner public support for their demands.

Among the eight other PKR MPs who signed the joint statement are Nik Nazmi, Wong Chen, Rodziah Ismail, Zahir Hassan, Muhammad Bakhtiar Wan Chik, Syed Ibrahim Syed Noh, S Kesavan and Onn Abu Bakar, however S Kesavan and Onn Abu Bakar were not present during the press conference.

On the next day, the Attorney General's Chambers (AGC) refuted the nine MPs' accusation of delays and irregularities in judicial appointment process. It clarified that JAC meeting can be held with short notice under urgency if all members agreed to it. AGC also stated that the allegations of judicial interference raised by the group are "premature and purely speculative" and the comparisons with the VK Lingam tape scandal were "unwarranted". In response, Rafizi claimed the AGC's statement further confirmed their concerns.

The press conference held by the nine PKR MPs was also commended by DAP Seputeh MP Teresa Kok on 7 July, who echoed similar demands with the group and urged prime minister Anwar to convene a briefing for all government MPs over the matter.

On 11 July, 19 PKR divisions in Johor called for the suspension of the nine lawmakers, citing breach of party discipline and ethics, as well as portraying Anwar's administration in bad light and allowing potential manipulation by the opposition. Rafizi in respond said suspension would not solve any issues and they will continue to voice their concerns.

== JAC meeting minute leak ==
On 12 July, an incomplete document alleged to be the minute of a JAC meeting held on 16 May 2025 was leaked on Reddit. In the meeting, the JAC was purportedly deliberating on the candidates to be recommended to prime minister Anwar Ibrahim for him to appoint a new Chief Judge of the High Court in Malaya.

Tengku Maimun, as the chairman of the commission, suggested Vazeer Alam Mydin Meera to be the candidate; while Hasnah Mohammed Hashim, the incumbent Chief Judge of Malaya, suggested Ahmad Terrirudin Mohd Salleh as the candidate.

Tengku Maimun subsequently questioned Terrirudin's qualification, citing his low number of written judgement as one of the reasons. She also alleged that the former attorney general had interfered in judicial appointments without adhering to established law, such as preparing a speech note for prime minister Anwar Ibrahim to advise the King to appoint Zabariah Mohd Yusof as the Chief Judge of Malaya, without going through the JAC. She also claimed that Terrirudin had failed to advise Anwar to consult with the Chief Justice of Malaysia and two Chief Judges of the High Courts in advance, before Anwar tenders his advice to the King, as required by Article 122B of the Constitution.

She also accused Terrirudin had requested her to rule in favour of certain party in a court case, and also asked for a High Court judge be removed from a case whom the former attorney general is displeased with.

Terrirudin was then called to testify before the meeting, in which he confirmed he had indeed prepared a speech note for Anwar to suggest Zabariah as the new Chief Judge of Malaya. However, for the rest of the allegations, he claimed that he no longer remember the said incidents. He left the JAC meeting after his testimony.

A secret ballot vote was held to pick the candidate, which resulted in a 4–4 tie. The leak then ends at a paragraph about whether Tengku Maimun has the power of a casting vote as the chairman of the commission to break the tie under Section 24 of the JAC Act 2009. The remaining part of the document was not revealed in the leak.

=== Reactions to the leak ===
==== Investigation ====
In response to the leak, communications minister and government spokesperson Fahmi Fadzil said he could not verify the authenticity of the document, however if it is found to be true, then it may ran foul with the Official Secret Act 1972 (OSA). He also cautioned the public and media not to circulate the document. Inspector-general of police Mohd Khalid Ismail meanwhile confirmed that police report has been lodged over the leak, and the matter is being investigated under the OSA, Penal Code, and Communications and Multimedia Act 1998. Mohd Khalid also similarly urged the public not to share any confidential or classified document.

On 15 July, Malaysiakini journalist RK Anand was questioned again by the police to identify the source behind the leak, Anand however refused to reveal it to the police.

==== Opposition politicians ====
Following the leak, several politicians, particularly from the opposition, have expressed concerns and called for investigation into the validity of the leaked document. Bersatu MP and Public Accounts Committee chairwoman Mas Ermieyati Samsudin described the contents of the leak as "madness". Meanwhile, PAS information chief Ahmad Fadhli Shaari demanded prime minister Anwar to provide an explanation over the allegations contained in the leak, while Bersatu information chief Tun Faisal Ismail Aziz called for an investigation into the contents of the document. Perikatan Nasional chairman Muhyiddin Yasin, who also called for a thorough investigation, commented that the leak contains serious allegations of power abuse and judicial interference, and if proven true, will profoundly damage the judiciary's credibility.

==== Government politicians ====
DAP backbencher Ramkarpal Singh similarly expressed concerns over the leak. He said the fact that the case is being investigated under OSA implied the leaked document may indeed be authentic, and he was disappointed on why the police made no mention on whether the allegations revealed in the minute will be probed as well. Ramkarpal then urged prime minister Anwar not to consider the implicated judge for appointment to any higher judicial positions until the investigation is over.

Meanwhile, Rafizi Ramli in a forum on 13 July claimed that the same "ultra-rich elites" behind the VK Lingam scandal may be responsible for the current controversy as well, and the implicated judge may be elevated to the post of Chief Justice of Malaysia.

== Protest ==
On 14 July, a protest organised by the Malaysian Bar Council was held in Putrajaya to call for the safeguarding of judicial independence in Malaysia and the establishment of a royal commission of inquiry to investigate possible judicial interference. According to Malaysian Bar, the event saw some 1,600 participants marched from the Palace of Justice to the Perdana Putra complex, where the organisers then handed over a memorandum containing several demands to the Prime Minister's Office.

Notably, the protest was also joined by Anwar's daughter and PKR deputy president Nurul Izzah, who called for the establishment a five-judge independent tribunal to investigate claims of judicial interference.

Several other prominent political figures, such as former Dewan Negara president and UMNO member Rais Yatim, PAS secretary general Takiyuddin Hassan, and PAS MP Awang Hashim also participated in the protest. The protest also saw the attendance of prominent figures from the legal fraternity, such as former attorney general Tommy Thomas, former MACC chief commissioner Latheefa Koya, former Malaysian Bar presidents Ambiga Sreenevasan and Karen Cheah, and human rights lawyer Siti Kasim.

Nurul Izzah's surprised attendance was positively described by an Ilham Centre observer as the continuance of upholding PKR's reformist struggle, while Rafizi commented that her attendance put PKR at an awkward position as her view differs from the official party line, which denies there is an ongoing judicial crisis. MCA Youth's Tan Jie Sen meanwhile criticised her participation might be just a "carefully choreographed political performance".

== Filling of vacancies ==
=== JAC meeting (July 2025) ===
After the positions of chief justice and the president of Court of Appeal fell vacant, Hasnah Mohammed Hashim as the acting chief justice called for an emergency JAC meeting on 4 July. However, the validity of the meeting was called into question, as a 10 days prior notice must be given before a JAC meeting is held, as stipulated under Section 13(2) of the JAC Act 2009.

=== Briefing for government MPs ===
On 10 July, DAP secretary general Anthony Loke revealed that a briefing for Pakatan Harapan (PH) MPs over the recent judicial controversy will be organised by the prime minister on 14 July, and attending MPs may seek clarification during the briefing.

On 11 July, Anwar met with Barisan Nasional (BN) leaders at his official residence to clarify the recent judicial issues, following suggestion by his deputy Ahmad Zahid Hamidi. A BN MP later revealed law minister Azalina Othman Said was there to provide explanation on the process of appointing judges; while Anwar reiterated that he will not interfere in judicial appointments, according to another attending MP. Not much questions were raised by attendees during the meeting. After the meeting, Anwar said BN leaders were understanding and cooperative over the issues.

On 14 July, a briefing for PH MPs was held at Seri Perdana complex as scheduled, which lasted for nearly two hours. Attending MPs were given explanation on the judicial appointment process under Article 125 of the Constitution by law minister Azalina. The formation of a tribunal and the JAC minute leak were also discussed. Anwar also assured PH leaders that critical vacancies in the judiciary will be filled soon, according to Loke. Both Fahmi and Anwar claimed the briefing were well received by the attending PH lawmakers.

During the briefing, several PH MPs have pressured Anwar not to nominate Terrirudin for top judicial positions. One anonymous PH MP said that they were told during the briefing that Terrirudin was not recommended to the King for appointment as Chief Justice of Malaysia, President of the Court of Appeal, Chief Judge of Malaya or Chief Judge of Sabah and Sarawak. However, two other attending PH MPs claimed otherwise, saying the candidate list for the four top judicial posts was not revealed to them during the meeting. Attendees were also told the reason why Tengku Maimun's tenure was not extended, according to Syahredzan Johan, but he did not divulge further details.

Rafizi and Nik Nazmi did not attend the briefing, with the former citing he had known what kind of explanation will be given by Anwar months prior along with other closed circle individuals, while the latter said he was on a business trip to Singapore.

=== Conference of Rulers ===
Between 15 and 17 July 2025, a three-day meeting of the Conference of Rulers was held, in which appointments of chief justice, Court of Appeal president and chief judge of Malaya was among the topics discussed. Anwar had on 15 July said that he had a lengthy discussion with the Conference of Rulers on the morning of 15 July and the new Chief Justice will be announced on 16 July.

The announcement of new chief justice expected on 16 July did not materialise, but it was reported that agreement on the candidates for top judicial positions has been reached in the Conference of Rulers on that day. In the meantime, Sultan of Selangor Sharafuddin Idris Shah on 17 July urged the public not to speculate over the matter.

=== Appointment and swearing in ===
On the midnight of 18 July, in a twist of event, the chief registrar of the Federal Court announced that Wan Ahmad Farid Wan Salleh will be appointed as the new Chief Justice of Malaysia, while federal judge Abu Bakar Jais will also be appointed as the new President of the Court of Appeal. Azizah Nawawi, a Court of Appeal judge, will take over the post of Chief Judge of Sabah and Sarawak as well once Abdul Rahman Sebli retires on 25 July. Terrirudin however was not elevated to any higher post as previously speculated. The swearing in ceremony is set to be held at Istana Negara on 28 July 2025.

A day later, Anwar also revealed the appointment of 14 new High Court judges and 8 new Court of Appeal judges was consented to by the King and the Conference of Rulers on the 16 July meeting, and they will sworn in along with the three top judges at Istana Negara on 28 July. Anwar claimed that the appointment of the new chief justice has shown that he did not interfere in judicial appointment and Terrirudin was never proposed to the King. He also said the allegations of judicial interference were spread by "senior lawyers who are playing politics".

On 28 July, Wan Ahmad Farid, Abu Bakar Jais, and Azizah Nawawi sworn into their new positions before the King at Istana Negara. Six Court of Appeal judges (Note: Following the appointment on 28 July, the Court of Appeal (COA) has reached its constitutional limit of 32 judges. However, two existing COA judges will soon retire and make way for two new COA judges, resulting in a total of 8 newly appointed COA judges, corresponding to the number of new COA judges previously announced by Anwar on 19 July.) and 14 High Court judges were sworn in as well. After his appointment, Abu Bakar expressed his intention to expand the current eight Court of Appeal panels to ten panels, while Azizah Nawawi who became first female chief judge of Sabah and Sarawak expressed her gratitude over her appointment to the post.

== See also ==
- Royal commission of inquiry into the Lingam Video Clip
- 1988 Malaysian constitutional crisis
- Judiciary of Malaysia
- Tengku Maimun Tuan Mat
- Ahmad Terrirudin Mohd Salleh
