= Judiciary of Malaysia =

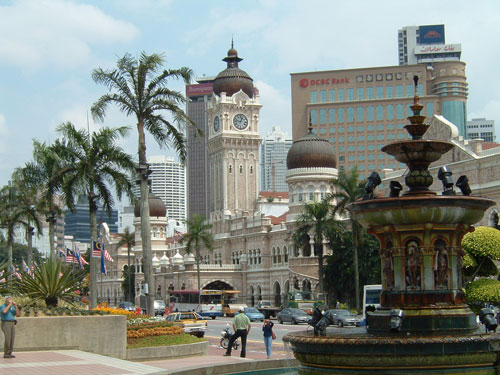
The Sultan Abdul Samad Building nearby Merdeka Square formerly housed the superior courts of the country. Today the courts have shifted to either the Palace of Justice in Putrajaya during the early 2000s, or the Kuala Lumpur Courts Complex in 2007.

Judiciary of Malaysia is largely centralised despite Malaysia being a federation. Malaysia's judiciary is governed by Part IX of the Federal Constitution, and has jurisdiction over wide range of civil and criminal matters. It is also heavily influenced by the English common law, and occasionally by case law from other Commonwealth countries.

Malaysia also has another set of state-level courts known as the Syariah Courts, which is separate from the aforementioned secular judiciary and operate according to Islamic jurisprudence, but with limited jurisdiction.

== Current system ==
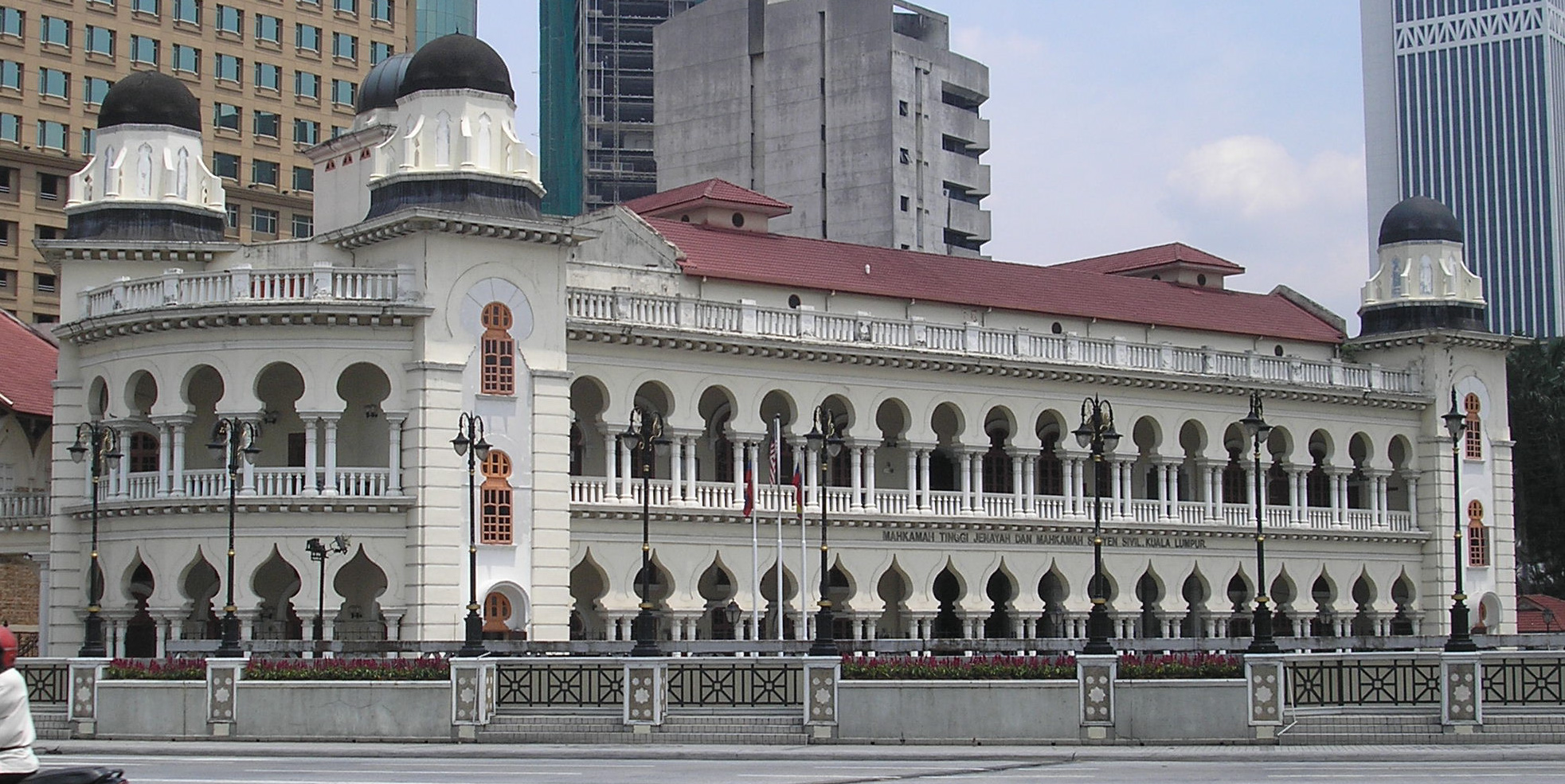
Old High Court Building, Kuala Lumpur

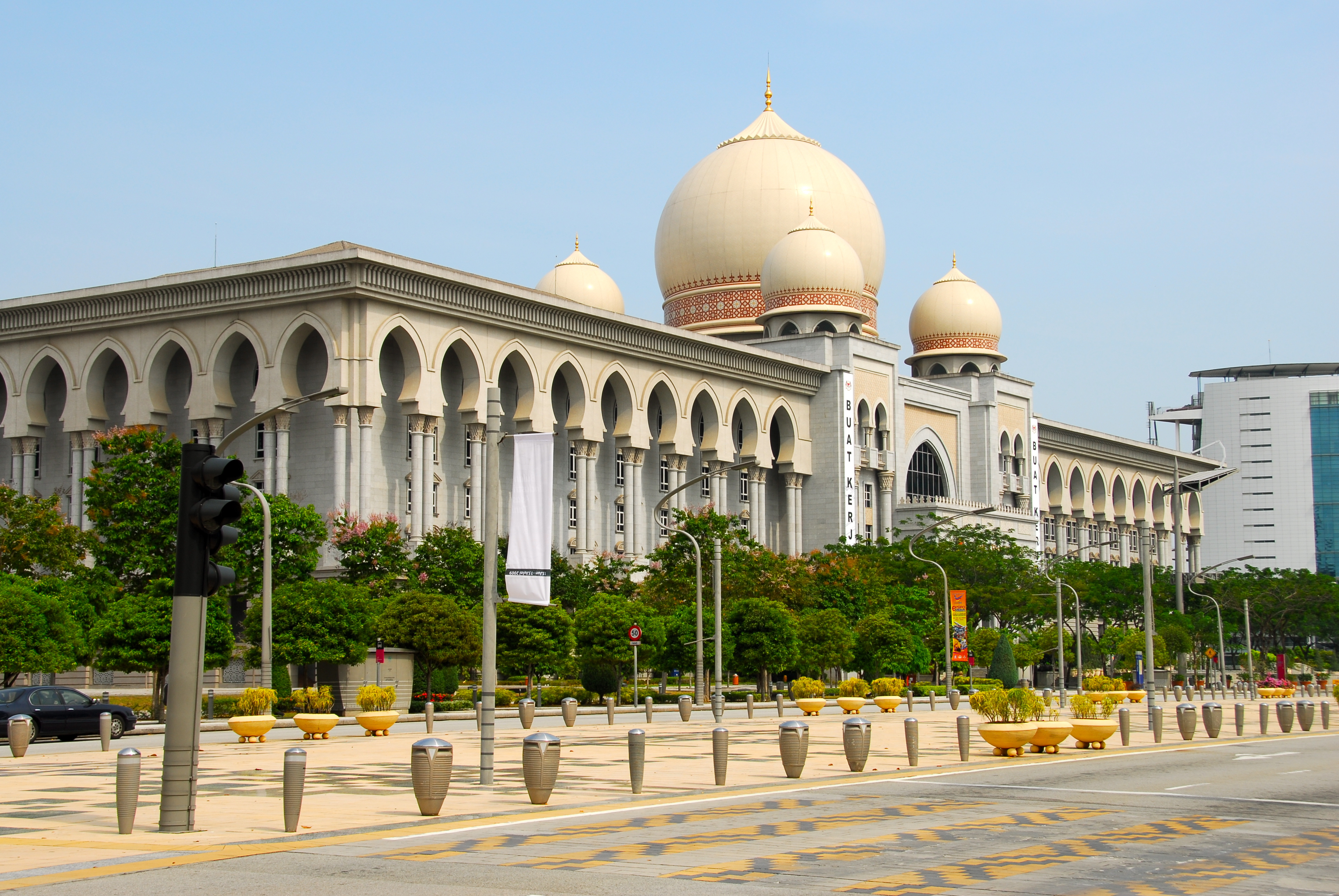
Palace of Justice, Putrajaya

There are generally two types of trials, criminal and civil. The hierarchy of courts begins from the Magistrates' Court, Sessions Court, High Court, Court of Appeal, and finally, the Federal Court. The jurisdiction of the courts in civil or criminal matters are contained in the Subordinate Courts Act 1948 and the Courts of Judicature Act 1964. Article 121 of the Constitution provides for two High Courts of co-ordinate jurisdiction, the High Court in Malaya, and the High Court in Sabah and Sarawak (and High Court in Singapore between 1963 and 1965 when Singapore is part of Malaysia). Thus this creates two separate local jurisdiction of the courts – for Peninsular Malaysia and for East Malaysia.

The highest position in the judiciary of Malaysia is the Chief Justice of the Federal Court of Malaysia (also known as the Chief Justice of Malaysia), followed by the President of the Court of Appeal, the Chief Judge of Malaya, and the Chief Judge of Sabah and Sarawak. The superior courts are the High Court, Court of Appeal, and the Federal Court, while the Magistrates' Courts and the Sessions Courts are classified as subordinate courts.

Since 28 July 2025, the Chief Justice of the Federal Court is Wan Ahmad Farid Wan Salleh, the President of the Court of Appeal is Abu Bakar Jais, and the Chief Judge of Malaya is Hasnah Mohammed Hashim. Meanwhile, the current Chief Judge of Sabah and Sarawak is Azizah Haji Nawawi.

Since 2003, the two highest courts of the country, namely the Federal Court and the Court of Appeal, have been located at the Palace of Justice, Putrajaya.

=== Superior courts ===
==== Federal Court ====
The Federal Court is the highest court in Malaysia. The Federal Court may hear appeals of civil decisions of the Court of Appeal where the Federal Court grants leave to do so. The Federal Court also hears criminal appeals from the Court of Appeal, but only in respect of matters heard by the High Court in its original jurisdiction (i.e. where the case has not been appealed from the Subordinate Courts).

==== Court of Appeal ====
The Court of Appeal generally hears all civil appeals against decisions of the High Courts except where against judgment or orders made by consent. In cases where the claim is less than RM250,000, the judgment or order relates to costs only, and the appeal is against a decision of a judge in chambers on an interpleader summons on undisputed facts, the leave of the Court of Appeal must first be obtained. The Court of Appeal also hears appeals of criminal decisions of the High Court. It is the court of final jurisdiction for cases which began in any subordinate courts.

==== High Courts ====
The two High Courts in Malaysia have general supervisory and revisionary jurisdiction over all the Subordinate Courts, and jurisdiction to hear appeals from the Subordinate Courts in civil and criminal matters.

The High Courts have unlimited civil jurisdiction, and generally hear actions where the claim exceeds RM1,000,000, other than actions involving motor vehicle accidents, landlord and tenant disputes and distress. The High Courts hear all matters relating to:

- the validity or dissolution of marriage (divorce) and matrimonial causes,
- bankruptcy and matters relating to the winding-up of companies,
- guardianship or custody of children,
- grants of probate, wills and letters of administration of estates,
- injunctions, specific performance or rescissions of contracts,
- legitimacy of persons.

The High Courts have unlimited jurisdiction in all criminal matters other than matters involving Islamic law. The High Courts have original jurisdiction in criminal cases punishable by death.

Cases are heard by a single judge in the High Court, or by a judicial commissioner. While High Court judges enjoy security of tenure, judicial commissioners are appointed for a term of two years, and do not enjoy similar protection under the Constitution.

An application for a judicial review is applied in this court.

=== Subordinate courts ===
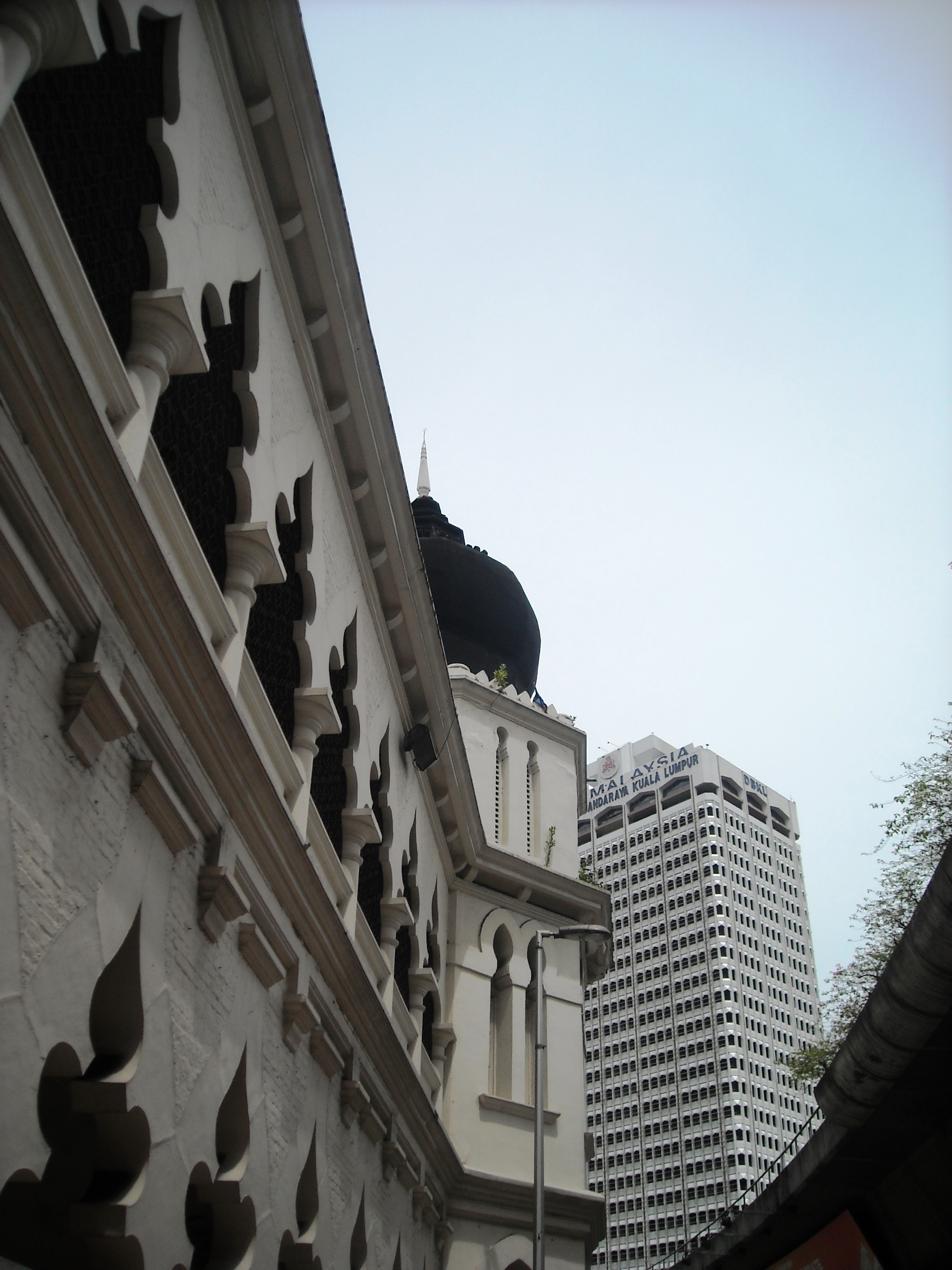
Magistrates' Courts and Sessions Courts in Kuala Lumpur

The Magistrates' Courts and Sessions Courts in Malaysia have the power in both criminal and civil matters.

==== Sessions Courts ====
Somewhat like the former Quarter Sessions in England, but does not exceed RM1,000,000 as per ss 65(1)(b), 73(b), 93(1) of the Subordinate Courts Act 1948 (SCA). The exception however is in matters relating to motor vehicle accidents, landlord and tenant and distress, where the Sessions Courts have unlimited jurisdiction pursuant to s 65(1)(a)SCA. Also, by virtue of s 65(3) SCA, the parties to a legal action may enter into an agreement in writing to grant jurisdiction to the Sessions Court to try an action beyond its prescribed monetary jurisdiction aforesaid.

==== Magistrates Courts ====
Magistrates are divided into First Class and Second Class Magistrates, the former being legally qualified and having greater powers, while the latter are normally appointed.

==== Other courts ====
The court of a penghulu, or Malay village head, has the power to hear civil matters of which the claim does not exceed RM50, where the parties are of an Asian race and speak and understand the Malay language.

The Penghulu Court's criminal jurisdiction is limited to offences of a minor nature charged against a person of Asian race which is specially enumerated in his warrant, which can be punished with a fine not exceeding RM25. However, the Penghulu Court has been abolished since 1 March 2013.

In Sabah and Sarawak, there are no Penghulus' Courts, but there are instead Native Courts (Malay: Mahkamah Anak Negeri) having jurisdiction on matters of native law and custom.

The Court for Children, previously known as the Juvenile Court, hears cases involving minors except cases carrying the death penalty, which are heard in High Courts instead. Cases for children are governed by the Child Act 2001. A child is defined as any person below the age of 18.

Following the 1993 constitutional amendment and the abolition of royal immunity, a Special Court was established to hear cases of offences or wrongdoings made by a Ruler. A Ruler includes the Yang di-Pertuan Agong (King), the sultans of monarchical states in Malaysia, the Yang di-Pertua Negeri, and the Yang di-Pertuan Besar, who are the head of state of Malaysia and its component states. Prior to this, a Ruler was immune from any proceedings brought against them in their personal capacity. Faridah Begum bte Abdullah v Ahmad Shah was the first case to be heard in this court.

=== Syariah Courts ===
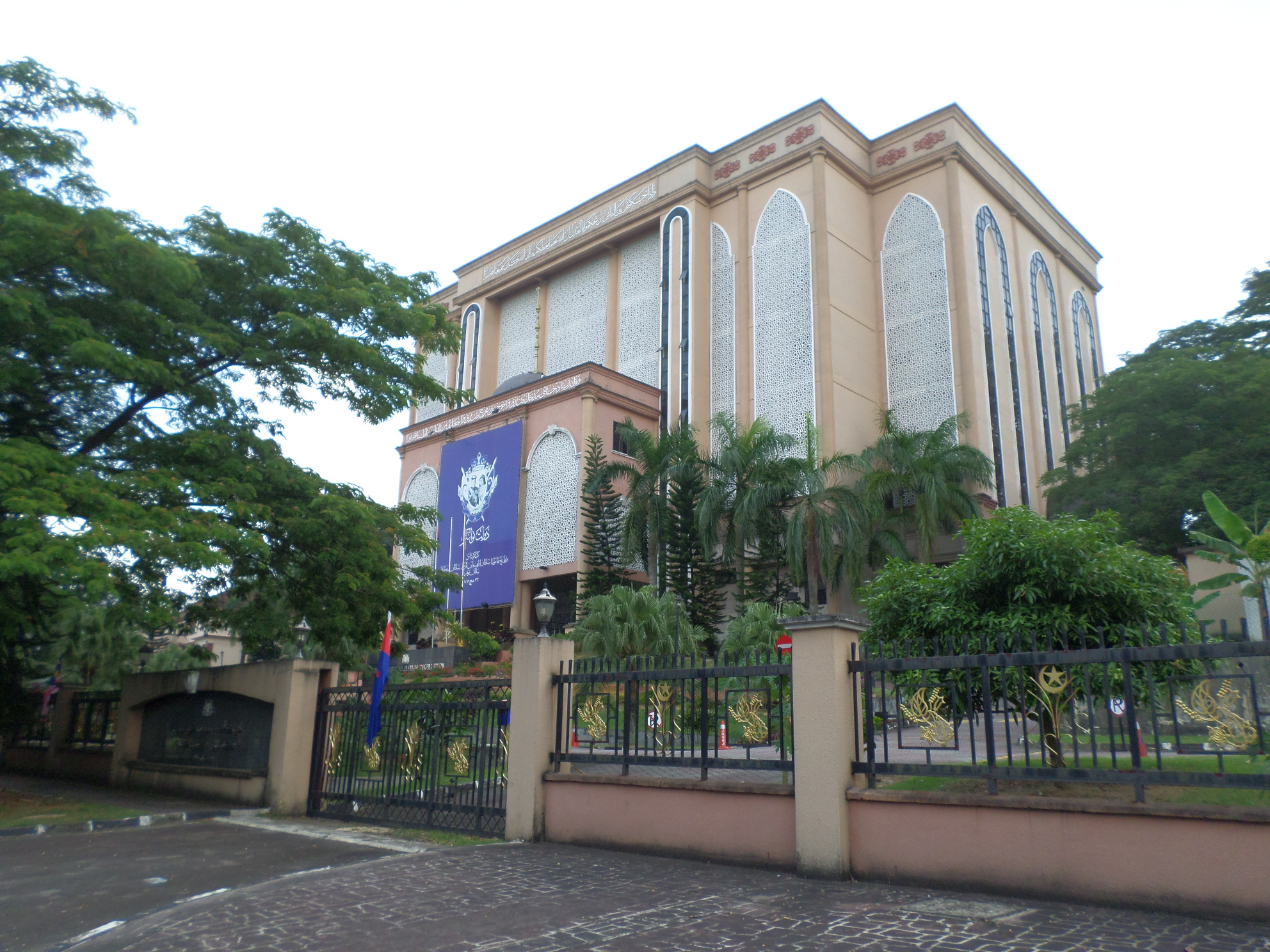
Johor Syariah Court in Johor Bahru, Johor.

There is a parallel system of state-level Syariah Courts which has limited jurisdiction over matters of Islamic law. The Syariah Courts only have jurisdiction over Muslims, and can only pass sentences that are not more than three years imprisonment, a fine of up to RM5,000, and/or up to six strokes of the cane. The scope of Islamic law in Malaysia is also generally limited to personal laws (such as marriage, divorce, adoption and inheritance) and offences that are against the precepts of Islam, but such jurisdiction may not extend into general criminal matters, which are governed by federal law and the secular courts, as highlighted in the Nik Elin v Kelantan court case.

== Appointment of judges ==
The appointment of the Chief Justice is governed by Article 122B of the Constitution of Malaysia whereby the Yang di-Pertuan Agong (King) appoints the Chief Justice on the advice of the Prime Minister of Malaysia after consulting the Conference of Rulers. As for the appointment of the President of the Court of Appeal, the Chief Judge of Malaya, the Chief Judge of Sabah and Sarawak, and other Federal Court judges, similar procedure is taken with the additional requirement of consultation with the Chief Justice.

The appointment of Court of Appeal judges is also governed by the same procedures with the additional requirement for the consultation of the President of the Court of Appeal. As for the appointment of High Court judges, similar procedures are prescribed with the additional requirement of consultation with the respective Chief Judges.

The appointment of Sessions Court judges is governed by Section 59 of the Subordinate Court Act 1948. They are appointed by the Yang di-Pertuan Agong upon the advice of the respective Chief Judges.

Section 78 of the Subordinate Courts Act 1948 provides that the appointment of magistrates are done by the respective state government upon the advice of the respective Chief Judges, except for magistrates in the Federal Territory, where they are appointed by the —Yang di-Pertuan Agong upon the advice of the Chief Judge.

== List of chief justices of the Federal Court ==
- Abdul Hamid Omar (1994, previously Lord President)
- Mohamed Eusoff Chin (1994–2000)
- Mohamed Dzaiddin Abdullah (2000–2003)
- Ahmad Fairuz Abdul Halim (2003–2007)
- Abdul Hamid Mohamad (2007–2008)
- Zaki Tun Azmi (2008–2011)
- Arifin Zakaria (2011–2017)
- Md Raus Sharif (2017–2018)
- Richard Malanjum (2018–2019)
- Tengku Maimun Tuan Mat (2019–2025)
- Wan Ahmad Farid Wan Salleh (2025–present)

For a list of lord presidents, see Lord President of the Federal Court.

== See also ==
- Law of Malaysia
- Capital punishment in Malaysia
- 1988 Malaysian constitutional crisis
- Royal Commission of Inquiry into the Lingam Video Clip
- 2025 Malaysian judicial appointment controversy
