= 1988 Malaysian constitutional crisis =

Political crisis

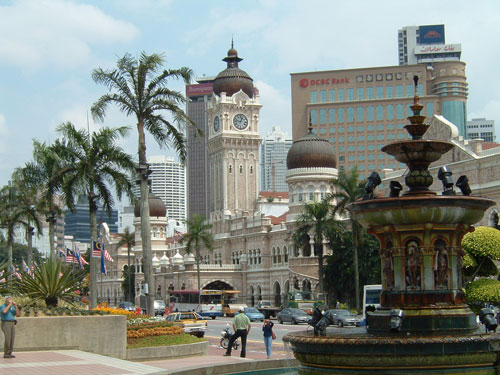
The Sultan Abdul Samad Building housed the Supreme Court at the time of the 1988 Malaysian constitutional crisis.

The 1988 Malaysian constitutional crisis (also known as the 1988 judicial crisis) was a series of events that began with United Malays National Organisation (UMNO) party elections in 1987 and ended with the suspension and the eventual removal of the Lord President of the Supreme Court, Tun Salleh Abas, from his seat. The Supreme Court in the years leading up to 1988 had been increasingly independent of the other branches of the government. Matters then came to a head when Mahathir Mohamad (who believed in the supremacy of the executive and legislative branches) became Prime Minister.

Since 1988, there have been regular calls for an official review of the government's actions throughout the crisis. In 2008, newly appointed de facto Law Minister Zaid Ibrahim said the government had to make an open apology to the sacked judges, calling the government's actions during the crisis "inappropriate". Not long after, Prime Minister Abdullah Ahmad Badawi called the crisis one which the nation had never recovered from and announced ex gratia compensation for the sacked and suspended judges.

== Judicial intervention in a political dispute ==
In 1987, the United Malays National Organisation (UMNO) — a leading party in the governing Barisan Nasional coalition – held elections for its numerous offices. For the first time in twelve years, the incumbent Prime Minister, Mahathir, was challenged. Tengku Razaleigh Hamzah was the candidate of "Team B" for the Prime Minister, taking on Mahathir, whose camp was labelled "Team A". There was an intense campaign to win the support of the roughly 1,500 delegates from party branches all over the country, who would elect the party officers. Razaleigh's supporters expected him to win, and at the UMNO General Assembly shortly after the votecounting was completed, rumours spread that Razaleigh had won. However, the official results declared Mahathir the winner, with 761 votes to Razaleigh's 718. The Team A candidate for Deputy Prime Minister, Ghafar Baba, defeated Musa Hitam of Team B as well, and 16 of the 25 seats on the UMNO Supreme Council also went to Team A.

Razaleigh's supporters were upset by the election, which they insisted had to have been rigged. Their anger was exacerbated by Mahathir, who went on to purge all Team B members from the Cabinet. As a result, 12 UMNO members filed a lawsuit in the High Court, seeking a court order to void the election results and pave the way for a new election. The plaintiffs alleged that 78 of the delegates had been selected by branches not registered with the Registrar of Societies, and as a result were not eligible to vote. They also claimed that certain documents related to the election had been "tampered with". Although Razaleigh was not among the twelve plaintiffs, he was widely believed to be funding and co-ordinating the suit.

Later, one of the twelve withdrew from the case, but the remaining eleven continued to press on. The High Court eventually gave the parties a two-week deadline to reach an out of court settlement. An UMNO "Unity Panel" was formed to handle the negotiations and reach a compromise. However, it soon became clear that the differences were intractable – Team B would settle for no less than a new election, while Team A insisted that the suit be withdrawn and a "face-saving" solution be reached which would allow some Team B members to remain in the party. Eventually the eleven plaintiffs declared they would seek a final judgement from the court.

This did not please Mahathir, who had clashed on several previous occasions with the judiciary. In one instance, a government order revoking the work permits of two foreign journalists critical of the government had been over-ruled by the Supreme Court. Mahathir began making heated attacks on the judiciary, telling Time, "The judiciary says, 'Although you passed a law with a certain thing in mind, we think that your mind is wrong, and we want to give our interpretation.' If we disagree, the Courts will say, 'We will interpret your disagreement.' If we [the government and Parliament] go along, we are going to lose our power of legislation." Mahathir also lashed out at "black sheep [judges] ... who want to be ... fiercely independent," accusing them of playing to public opinion. Immediately after this latter statement, the government reassigned several High Court judges to different divisions, including Justice Harun Hashim who was then hearing the UMNO case. However, as the latter case was already in progress, Harun's transfer would not take effect until the case closed.

Harun was thus forced to make the final call on the case of the "UMNO 11". Although most of the evidence they had presented was not contested, the UMNO defence argued that not all possible remedies within UMNO had been exhausted. The plaintiffs, however, insisted that the fact that at least 30 unregistered branches had sent delegates to the UMNO elections should have been enough to nullify their results. In the end, Harun dismissed the suit, citing Article 41 of the Societies Act 1966, which stated any society would automatically become "unlawful" if any of its branches were not registered with the Registrar of Societies. As a result, Harun declared he had no choice but to declare UMNO "an unlawful society", thereby rendering "[w]hat happened in 1987" a nullity. In his decision, Harun blamed Parliament for forcing his hand: "If the old law was in existence... [one could] apply the common law principle, but here it seems the Parliament, to ensure strict compliance with the law, has made this provision look harsh."

As soon as the decision was made public, Mahathir assured UMNO members that as the decision was based on minor "technicalities", the party could easily be restored as a lawful society. He also reminded the public that this did not threaten his status as Prime Minister, as only a no-confidence vote could lawfully remove him from power. Within a fortnight of Harun's decision, Mahathir announced the registration of UMNO Baru (New UMNO). UMNO Baru's leadership was almost entirely composed of Team A members, who proceeded to spend the next few months transferring the assets of the "old" UMNO to UMNO Baru. The UMNO 11 pursued their case to the highest court in the land, the Supreme Court, still seeking to hold new elections for the "old" UMNO and having its lawful status restored. However, their appeal was rejected. Razaleigh then decided to form a new party focused on the "spirit of 1946" — the year UMNO had been founded. UMNO Baru in turn decided that the "Baru" was superfluous, and officially dropped it from its name, in effect claiming to be the true successor to UMNO instead of Razaleigh's party, which would eventually call itself Semangat 46 (Spirit of 46).

== Constitutional amendments ==
The "UMNO 11" case was just one of a number which had irritated Mahathir and the government. The case of the two journalists mentioned earlier had begun when John Berthelsen and Raphael Pura authored a series of articles on financial transactions of dubious ethical and legal nature carried out by government officials. The Asian Wall Street Journal which published them was promptly banned from the country, and Mahathir in his capacity as Home Affairs Minister had Berthelsen's and Pura's work permits revoked. However, the Supreme Court overturned the cancellation of Berthelsen's work permit because he had not been given a chance to answer the charges of the government. As a result, the ban on the Asian Wall Street Journal was also lifted. In a different case, the Supreme Court used its power of judicial review, and nullified amendments to the Criminal Procedure Code which gave the Attorney-General the power to initiate criminal proceedings in the High Court without first going to a Magistrate's Court. After Operation Lalang in 1987, where the government detained several political dissidents without trial under the Internal Security Act (ISA), the High Court granted Karpal Singh's application to be released from detention due to technicalities in the way he had been detained.

This last case did it for Mahathir. The following week, he submitted several constitutional amendments to Parliament, divesting the courts of the "judicial power of the Federation" and giving them only such judicial powers as Parliament might grant them. In justifying the amendments, Mahathir stated: "...the courts have decided that in enforcing the law they are bound by their interpretations and not by the reasons for which Parliament formulated these laws ... lately the judiciary had seen fit to touch on matters which were previously regarded as solely within the executive's jurisdiction."

The Lord President of the Supreme Court, Tun Salleh Abas, was pressured by his fellow judges to respond to the government's actions. Salleh decided to convene a meeting of all 20 judges from the Supreme and High Courts in the capital of Kuala Lumpur. At the meeting, they agreed not to publicly reply to Mahathir's criticisms. Instead, they wrote a confidential letter to the Yang di-Pertuan Agong (King) and the Malay rulers, expressing their grievances. The proposed letter, which was unanimously approved, was written by Salleh Abas. The letter stated the judges' disappointment "with the various comments and accusations made by the Honourable Prime Minister against the Judiciary," but did not demand specific action be taken – instead, it ended with an expression of "hope that all those unfounded accusations will be stopped".

== Suspension and removal of Tun Salleh Abas and other judges ==
In 1988, Tun Salleh Abas was brought before a tribunal convened by the then Prime Minister Dr Mahathir Mohammad on the grounds of misconduct. The tribunal was chaired by Tun Hamid Omar. In response to the tribunal, Tun Salleh Abas filed a suit in the High Court in Kuala Lumpur to challenge the constitutionality of the tribunal. While proceeding with the suit, Tun Salleh Abas applied for an interim stay against the tribunal until 4 July 1988. The request was denied.

Later however, five judges of the Supreme Court convened and granted Tun Salleh Abas an interlocutory order against the tribunal. Upon receiving the order, Tun Salleh Abas' solicitors proceed to the Parliament to present the chairman of the tribunal the interlocutory order. The gate leading to the Parliament however was locked and Tun Salleh Abas' representative had to call in the police to be guaranteed a passage into the Parliament. Eventually, the order was presented to the tribunal chairman.

Soon after, the five judges were suspended. The judges were Tan Sri Azmi Kamaruddin, Tan Sri Eusoffe Abdoolcader, Tan Sri Wan Hamzah Mohamed Salleh, Tan Sri Wan Suleiman Pawanteh and Datuk George Seah. This effectively suspended the Supreme Court, and made it so that the challenge toward the legality of the tribunal could not be heard. The tribunal later removed Tun Salleh Abas from his office, whereas the other three judges were later reinstated. The irregular dismissal of Tun Salleh Abas led the Bar Council of Malaysia to refuse recognising the new Lord President.

== Legacy ==
A major critic to Mahathir's actions include Malaysia's first Prime Minister, Tunku Abdul Rahman. In a New York Times article, he was said to be "disgusted" at the actions. His views however were criticised by the then Education Minister, Anwar Ibrahim, who claimed that the Tunku was ″a grand old man who has done his bit.″

Mahathir's supporters insisted that it had liberated the Malaysian judiciary from a colonial mindset. The sacking of several justices was justified by claims that these judges had been abusing public funds for their personal expenses – such as the purchase of luxury furniture from Italy. It was also claimed that the sackings had eliminated deadwood and improved efficiency in the courts, as evinced by a reduction in their backlog.

== Call to revisit the case ==
Mahathir Mohammed stepped down from the premiership in 2003, having chosen Abdullah Ahmad Badawi to succeed him. In 2006, the relationship between the two became less than warm as Mahathir started to criticise the latter's policies. During this period, many begin calling for the judiciary or government to review the decision against the sacked judges. Among the loudest advocates of the review was Tun Salleh Abas himself. The administration dismissed such calls. Minister in the Prime Minister's Department Nazri Aziz, who was then de facto Law Minister, said that he was not convinced of the need to review the case.

After the 2008 general election which saw heavy losses for BN, Abdullah reshuffled his Cabinet. Within days of his appointment, new de facto Law Minister Zaid Ibrahim stated that the government had to openly apologise for its handling of the crisis, calling it one of his three main goals: "In the eyes of the world, the judicial crisis has weakened our judiciary system." However, he rejected the idea of reviewing the decision: "I am not suggesting that we re-open the case. I am saying that it's clear to everyone, to the world, that serious transgressions had been committed by the previous administration. And I believe that the prime minister is big enough and man enough to say that we had done wrong to these people and we are sorry." The Bar Council welcomed the proposal. Newly appointed Domestic Trade and Consumer Affairs Minister Shahrir Abdul Samad also voiced support: "The Government has apologised for so many other things to the people, such as the untimely destruction of temples and other issues. So, why not an apology to a former Lord President?"

Zaid's proposal was criticised by former Bar president Param Cumaraswamy, who insisted that Mahathir's administration, not Abdullah's, should assume responsibility: "Those who perpetrated the transgressions are still alive and they must be called to account for their conduct and seek forgiveness from the six valiant judges, their families and Malaysians generally for the sacrilege committed to the temple of independent justice." He also proposed that the government compensate the three sacked judges since "reinstatement of the three dismissed is no longer possible." Karpal Singh, lawyer and opposition member of Parliament, agreed: "Calling for the present administration to apologise is not a step in (the) right direction. It is not the present administration that convened those tribunals." Instead, Karpal suggested that a Royal Commission be set up. A few days later, The Malaysian Insider, a news website, reported that the Cabinet was critical of the proposal, citing the potential for legal liability if the government admitted wrongdoing. Zaid said that the proposal was still being considered, and that "we have to wait."

In April 2008, at a dinner with 600 members of the Bar and leaders from the opposition Pakatan Rakyat coalition, Abdullah acknowledged the impact of the crisis:

To a large extent, the events of 1988 have fueled much of the disagreement on how to move on. ... I can say with a clear conscience that I abided and will continue to abide by the principle of separation of powers, leaving the matter of justice to the judiciary. And yet the legacy of 1988 haunts us until today. ... For many, the events of 1988 were an upheaval of the nation's judicial system. Rightly or wrongly, many disputed both the legality and morality of the related proceedings. For me, personally, I feel it was a time of crisis from which the nation never fully recovered.

He then announced that the government would make ex gratia goodwill payments to the sacked and suspended judges: "I do not presume to equate your contribution, pain and loss with mere currency but I hope you could accept this as a heartfelt and sincere gesture to mend what had been." However, he refused to explicitly apologise for the events of 1988 or otherwise review them, saying it would "prolong the sense of crisis". Abdullah also announced his intention to set up a judicial appointments commission as part of his plans to reform the judicial system. Two of the six judges involved in the 1988 crisis – Tun Salleh Abas and Azmi Kamaruddin – and the families of the other four were present.

Zaid welcomed Abdullah's announcement in spite of the lack of a formal apology, saying: "(One) can say sorry in other ways." George Seah's son told the press that although all his father wanted was an apology, the family would not reject any goodwill payments. Tan Sri Wan Suleiman Pawanteh's wife said: "Although I thank the prime minister, I feel less than satisfied at his decision (not to make a straightforward apology). This is not the end of the story for me. (Without an apology) I don't know, people don't know, that my husband was not guilty. I want my husband's name to be cleared. I feel my husband was innocent. He was an honest judge...Even so, I am thankful that our prime minister cares about us enough (to do this much)." Tan Sri Eusoffe Abdoolcader's granddaughter regretted that acknowledgement had been so late in coming: "I wish he was here. He's the main person affected by all this. It's a different case from the others (Salleh and Wan Suleiman) because he was reinstated. It's been 12 years. It should have been solved earlier." Tun Salleh Abas however welcomed Abdullah's statement, saying: "I feel great. It was something I didn't expect. I suffered so much humiliation ... so much so I ran away from the public and took solace in being a farmer."

== 2018: Mahathir's new claims ==
In January 2018, Mahathir (by then leader of Pakatan Harapan after leaving UMNO) denied responsibility for removing Tun Salleh Abas, insisting this was done under instructions from the then Yang di-Pertuan Agong, Iskandar of Johor. The former Prime Minister said he was prepared to swear on the Quran that his name had been used by the Attorney-General then, Tan Sri Abu Talib Othman, in order to distance the Agong from the matter. He also claimed there had been a letter with remarks from the Agong regarding Salleh, but said this has since been lost. He also maintained that Salleh's removal was prompted by the Agong's displeasure over a letter Salleh had allegedly written to the monarch regarding construction noises from the Ruler's nearby private home, which was also copied to the other Malay Rulers. Mahathir claimed that the Agong called him as prime minister and said he wanted Salleh sacked and passed him a copy of the Abas's alleged letter in question. Dr Mahathir claimed that the matter was discussed by his Cabinet then, which decided on a tribunal to remove Salleh as Lord President.

Former Attorney General Abu Talib Othman agreed that Dr Mahathir was not responsible for dismissing the Lord President. Othman clarified that he saw the note written, signed by the then Agong, asking then PM Mahathir to remove the Lord President and advised the PM on procedure, but denied Mahathir's claims that his name was being used to distance the Agong. Othman suggested that Mahathir was merely acting on the insistence of the then Yang di-Pertuan Agung himself in setting up of the dismissal tribunal via the provisions and channels of the Constitution as the PM and Attorney General had no powers to dismiss a Lord President. Abu Talib alleged that the Agong was displeased with Salleh's letter complaining about the criticisms levelled at the judiciary by the executive.

When asked about the revelations, Tun Salleh Abas stated that it was time to move on from the sacking which took place 30 years earlier, and that the crisis was merely being politicised in the lead up to the 14th General Election (where Mahathir was running as the opposition candidate for Prime Minister, which he successfully won later in May).

== Notes and references ==
=== Other references ===
- Datuk George Seah (2004). "The hidden story" Archived 4 January 2006 at the Wayback Machine. Aliran. Retrieved 30 December 2005.
- Datuk George Seah (2004). "Something's brewing In KL" Archived 4 January 2006 at the Wayback Machine. Aliran. Retrieved 30 December 2005.
- Datuk George Seah (2004). "Drama in the capital" Archived 19 December 2005 at the Wayback Machine. Aliran.Retrieved 30 December 2005.
- Datuk George Seah (2004). "The suspension of the Supreme Court" Archived 4 January 2006 at the Wayback Machine. Aliran. Retrieved 30 December 2005.
- Datuk George Seah (2004). "Colonels judging the generals?" Archived 4 January 2006 at the Wayback Machine. Aliran. Retrieved 30 December 2005.

== See also ==
- Constitutional crisis
- Judiciary of Malaysia
- Royal commission of inquiry into the Lingam Video Clip
- 2025 Malaysian judicial appointment controversy
