= Faridah v Ahmad Shah =

Faridah Begum bte Abdullah v. Sultan Haji Ahmad Shah Al Mustain Billah
- Court: Special Court of Malaysia
- Decided: 6–7 February 1996
- Citation: [1996] 1 MLJ 617

Court membership
- Judges sitting: Tun Mohamed Eusoff Chin, Tan Sri Anuar Zainal Abidin, Tan Sri Datuk Amar Chong Siew Fai, Tun Azmi Mohamed, Tun Mohamed Suffian Mohamed Hashim

Keywords
- Special Court, Rulers’ immunity, citizenship, sovereignty, reciprocity, constitutional interpretation

Faridah Begum bte Abdullah v. Sultan Haji Ahmad Shah Al Mustain Billah Ibni Almarhum Sultan Abu Bakar Ri’Ayatudin Al Mu’Adzam Shah, [1996] 1 MLJ 617 is the first and, prior to 2009, the only Malaysian case to have been heard by the Special Court of Malaysia, a court specialised in presiding over proceedings brought by or against the Yang di-Pertuan Agong and the Malay Rulers of the respective Malay states. The Special Court ruled that the plaintiff, being a Singapore citizen, could not be conferred the right to sue the Sultan of Pahang as the precise and clear wording of article 182(2) of the Federal Constitution of Malaysia did not entitle the plaintiff to take legal action against any of the Malay Rulers in the latter's personal capacity.

== Background ==
Article 181(1) of the Federal Constitution preserves and protects the sovereignty, prerogatives, powers and jurisdiction of a Malay Ruler. Before March 30, 1993, the Yang di-Pertuan Agong and a Ruler could not be sued at all nor charged with a criminal offence in his personal capacity as provided by articles 32(1) and 181(2) of the Federal Constitution. However, Parliament amended the said articles by adding the words ‘except in the Special Court established under Part XV’ of the Federal Constitution:

Article 32 - Supreme Head of the Federation, and his Consort

(1) There shall be a Supreme Head of the Federation, to be called the ‘Yang di-Pertuan Agong, who shall take precedence over all persons in the Federation and shall not be liable to any proceedings whatsoever in any court except in the Special Court established under Part XV.

Article 181 - Saving for Rulers’ sovereignty, etc.

(2) No proceedings whatsoever shall be brought in any court against the Ruler of a State in his personal capacity except in the Special Court established under Part XV.

The amendments took away the immunity of the Yang di-Pertuan Agong and a Ruler from being sued or charged with a criminal offence but the proceedings must be brought in the Special Court. Article 182(3) of the Federal Constitution further confers exclusive jurisdiction on the Special Court to try all offences committed by a Ruler and all civil cases brought by, or against, a Ruler. Parliament in essence amended the Federal Constitution by introducing Part XV which contains articles 182 and 183 of the Federal Constitution:

Article 182 - The Special Court

(1) There shall be a court which shall be known as the Special Court and shall consist of the Chief Justice of the Federal Court, who shall be the Chairman, the Chief Judges of the High Courts, and two other persons who hold or have held office as judge of the Federal Court or a High Court appointed by the Conference of Rulers.

(2) Any proceedings by or against the Yang di-Pertuan Agong or the Ruler of a State in his personal capacity shall be brought in a Special Court established under Clause (1).

The plaintiff, Faridah Begum binti Abdullah, a businesswoman and a Singapore citizen, took legal action against the Sultan of Pahang, Sultan Haji Ahmad Shah Al Mustain Billah Ibni Almarhum Sultan Abu Bakar Ri’Ayatudin Al Mu’Adzam Shah for alleged libel committed against her and sued for damages in the Special Court. The Attorney General had given his consent to the plaintiff to sue the Sultan of Pahang under article 183 of the Federal Constitution. Nonetheless, the issue of the alleged libel was never addressed as it was not a question of fact but a question of law, specifically whether the plaintiff, not being a Malaysian citizen, had the right to sue the Sultan in his personal capacity in the Special Court.

== Decision ==
The case was heard by a bench of five judges, empanelled by the Chief Justice of Malaysia, Tun Datuk Seri Mohamed Eusoff bin Chin, the Chief Judge of the High Court of Malaya, Tan Sri Anuar Zainal Abidin, the Chief Judge of the High Court of Sabah and Sarawak, Tan Sri Datuk Amar Chong Siew Fai and two other Federal Court judges, Justices Tun Azmi bin Mohamed and Tun Mohamed Suffian bin Mohamed Hashim.

=== Majority Judgement ===
The Special Court issued its decision on February 6, 1996 and February 7, 1996. In a 4-1 judgement, the Special Court decided that the plaintiff, being a Singaporean citizen, was not entitled to take proceedings against the Sultan of Pahang in the Sultan’s personal capacity as the Sultan as well as the Malay Rulers were legally immune from lawsuits being brought against them from anyone outside of Malaysia. This principle was based on the concept of reciprocity and the principle of sovereign immunity under international law.

The majority judgement was written by Chief Justice of Malaysia, Tun Datuk Seri Mohamed Eusoff bin Chin and joined by the Chief Judge of the High Court of Sabah and Sarawak, Tan Sri Datuk Amar Chong Siew Fai and Justices Tun Azmi bin Mohamed and Justices Tun Mohamed Suffian bin Mohamed Hashim.

In addressing Parliament’s intention of conferring rights on persons outside of Malaysia the right to take legal action, Chief Justice Tun Datuk Seri Mohamed Eusoff bin Chin reasoned that the general presumption was that Parliament's legislative competence was normally restricted to territorial nexus and that statutes were not intended, in the absence of clear express language, to operate on events taking place or on persons outside the territories to which the statutes were expressed to be applied.

The Right Honourable Chief Justice further continued that article 73(a) of the Federal Constitution allowed Parliament to make laws having effect outside Malaysia. For instance, it can be seen in section 27 of the Prevention of Corruption Act 1961, which expressly provided that the provisions of that Act shall, in relation to citizens, have effect outside as well as within Malaysia. There was another presumption that a statute was not intended to apply to persons outside the territories of a country enacting it, and it was particularly strong in the case of foreigners, for the normal presumption is further strengthened by another presumption that the legislature intended to respect the rules of international law.

Chief Justice Tun Datuk Seri Mohamed Eusoff bin Chin also noted that the Federal Constitution still preserved, by virtue of article 181(1) of the Federal Constitution, the sovereignty, prerogatives, powers and jurisdiction of the Rulers, and article 181(2) of the Federal Constitution provided the narrow exception that if a Ruler was to be sued, the proceedings must be brought in the Special Court established by article 182(1) of Federal Constitution. The Special Court of Malaysia was conferred exclusive jurisdiction under article 182(3) of the Federal Constitution to try civil cases brought by or against a Ruler, which meant that the courts established under article 121 of the Federal Constitution cannot try such cases at all. Therefore, the amendment to article 181(2) of the Federal Constitution and the introduction of article 182 of the Federal Constitution were matters of a special and exceptional kind and were not intended to give rights to a person who is not a citizen of Malaysia, unless article 182 of the Federal Constitution so expressly provides by clear and unambiguous language.

The Right Honourable Chief Justice made reference to article 17 of the Constitution of the Republic of Singapore, which stipulated that the President of the Republic of Singapore is not liable to any proceedings whatsoever in any court. Therefore, a Malaysian citizen cannot sue the President of Singapore in any Singapore court. In addition, the Ruler of a Malay State cannot even be sued by any person in a Singapore court unless the Ruler waives his immunity.

Chief Justice Tun Datuk Seri Mohamed Eusoff bin Chin concluded that even if Parliament were to confer by the express language under article 182 of the Federal Constitution any right on a Singapore citizen to sue the Yang di-Pertuan Agong or a Ruler, such conferment of a right was unlawful under article 155 of the Federal Constitution and was of no effect, unless a similar right was given to a Malaysian citizen in Singapore to sue the President of Singapore. Parliament had wide legislative powers to make laws under articles 73(a) and 74 of the Federal Constitution but such powers were restricted by article 74(3) of the Federal Constitution. Parliament's legislative power was therefore subject to the special provision of article 155 of the Federal Constitution, so that even if Parliament were to confer a right on a Singapore citizen to sue the Yang di-Pertuan Agong or a Ruler, such conferment of right is illegal and ultra vires article 155 of the Federal Constitution:

Article 74 - Subject matter of Federal and state laws

(3) The power to make laws conferred by this Article is exercisable subject to any conditions or restrictions imposed with respect to any particular matter by this Constitution.

Article 155 - Commonwealth reciprocity

(1) Where the law in force in any other part of the Commonwealth confers upon citizens of the Federation any right or privilege it shall be lawful, notwithstanding anything in this Constitution, for Parliament to confer a similar right or privilege upon citizens of that part of the Commonwealth who are not citizens of the Federation.

=== Concurrences ===
Chief Judge of the High Court of Sabah and Sarawak, Tan Sri Datuk Amar Chong Siew Fai, Justice Tun Azmi bin Mohamed and Justice Tun Mohamed Suffian Mohamed Hashim authored separate concurrences. Chief Judge Tan Sri Datuk Amar Chong Siew Fai rejected the argument of the plaintiff’s counsel, Dato’ Seri Utama Karpal Singh s/o Ram Singh Deo, stating that although the distinction between ‘person’ and ‘citizen’ was beyond question, article 182(2) of the Federal Constitution employed none of those words. It fell short of expressing whether the proceedings were available to citizens only or to all persons including foreigners and was open to statutory interpretation. Thus, in the interpretation of a constitutional provision, while effect should be given to the language used, recognition should also be given to the character and origins of the instrument.

The Right Honourable Chief Judge further argued that permitting a foreigner such as the plaintiff to sue the Malay Rulers would be a substantial alteration to the position and privileges of the latter. Hence, such a situation ought not to be taken to have been intended except by clear and unequivocal words to the effect. Chief Judge Tan Sri Datuk Amar Chong Siew Fai also explained that the doctrine of reciprocity assumed considerable significance, in consideration that the President of the Republic of Singapore was absolutely immune from any suit brought by persons outside of Singapore.

Chief Judge Tan Sri Datuk Amar Chong Siew Fai concluded that to allow a citizen of Singapore to sue the Malay Ruler when the Constitution of the Republic forbade her President to be sued by a citizen of Malaysia would not be in accordance with the doctrine of reciprocity under international law. Hence, article 182(2) of the Federal Constitution, as it stood, fell short of the effect as the ambiguous or imprecise wording in the said provision did not entitle the plaintiff, as a citizen of the Republic of Singapore, to sue the Sultan of Pahang.

Justice Tun Azmi bin Mohamed wrote that the article 182 of the Federal Constitution not only had taken away the legal immunity enjoyed by the Sultan of Pahang from being sued but also abolished his rights to sue in the ordinary courts. Therefore, the Sultan of Pahang’s capacity to sue, or to be sued, cannot be recognised by the ordinary courts. As far as the ordinary courts were concerned, they continue as before to have no jurisdiction to hear any civil case against the Sultan of Pahang and in addition, they also ceased to have jurisdiction to hear all civil cases by the Sultan. The jurisdiction over these matters, even if the immunity was waived, had been conferred exclusively on the Special Court.

The Honourable Justice propounded that the courts must apply the established principle of interpretation applicable to written constitutions. The Federal Constitution is not an ordinary statute as it is the supreme law of the land, to which all existing and future legislative instruments must be subservient. The Constitutional (Amendment) Act 1993, the amendment which stripped off the immunity of the Malay Rulers, required the mandatory consent of the Conference of Rulers under article 38(4) of the Federal Constitution before the amending bill could become law with regard to every amendment directly affecting the privileges, position, honours and dignity of the Malay Rulers. Under article 159(5) of the Federal Constitution, any amendment of article 38 of the Federal Constitution per se is unconstitutional if passed without the consent of the Conference of Rulers.

Justice Tun Azmi bin Mohamed further elaborated that in interpreting an amendment to a written constitution, regard should be had not only to the words used by the promulgators of the amending Act but also to the traditions and usages which have given meaning to those words, and to the character and origin of the constitution under consideration. Under article 36 of the Pahang State Constitution, the Sultan of Pahang is the sovereign of the state and under article 2 of the Pahang State Constitution, the sovereign is the fountain head of justice and of all authority of government in the state and territory of Pahang. The basis of the Sultan’s legal immunity was, therefore, his position as a sovereign Ruler.

The Honourable Justice stated that in the absence of clear and express provisions, to hold that foreign plaintiffs can sue the Ruler and the Yang di-Pertuan Agong in the Special Court was to admit the absurdity that Malaysia and the states comprising Malaysia have no sovereignty in international law, which would open the floodgates of litigation by foreigners against the Yang di-Pertuan Agong. The exception clause in article 181(2) of the Federal Constitution, namely, ‘except in the Special Court established under Part XV’, was too general and ambiguous to convey the extraordinary alleged intention of Parliament to deplete Malaysia's sovereignty in international law.

Justice Azmi bin Mohamed concluded his concurrence, stating that in the absence of express provisions, and as there was doubt in the meaning of the words used and also doubt in the intention of Parliament and the Conference of Rulers, the presumption of continuity of the Rulers’ privilege, sovereignty and prerogative and legal immunity must prevail, as far as foreign citizens were concerned. The legal immunity of the Sultan of Pahang from being sued in his personal capacity by a non-citizen must, therefore, remain as before.

Justice Tun Mohamed Suffian bin Mohamed Hashim opined that the President of Singapore enjoyed total immunity and may not be sued by anybody. If, and only if, Singapore amended its Constitution to allow a Malaysian citizen to sue the President in Singapore (in other words, only if there is reciprocity) only then may the Malaysian Parliament confer on a Singapore citizen a similar right or privilege to sue a Ruler in Malaysia. Regardless, the Constitution of the Republic of Singapore had not been so amended. Therefore, a Singapore citizen generally had no right or privilege of suing the Malay Rulers in the Special Court. The Honourable Justice also highlighted that the Singapore President is the head of state of a sovereign country but the Ruler of Pahang is not as he is only a head of the State of Pahang. He may not, for instance, appoint or receive ambassadors but nevertheless, the Pahang State Constitution refers to him in many articles as the sovereign, and so does the Federal Constitution.

Justice Tun Mohamed Suffian bin Mohamed Hashim concluded his concurrence, explaining that article 181(2) of the Federal Constitution was meant to preserve the pre-independence position of the Malay Rulers who were then regarded as sovereign by the British, Malaysian and Singapore courts and therefore immune from the legal process, a position modified by amendments of Parliament.

=== Dissenting Judgement ===
Chief Judge of the High Court of Malaya, Tan Sri Anuar Zainal Abidin delivered the sole dissenting judgement. The Right Honourable Chief Judge argued that article 155(1) of the Federal Constitution did not prohibit Parliament from enacting a law giving a non-citizen like the plaintiff the right to sue a ruler such as the Sultan of Pahang in Malaysia.

The Right Honourable Chief Judge defined the word ‘Commonwealth’ to mean specifically Singapore. In Singapore, the citizens were not given any right or privilege to sue the Head of State, which being the President of Singapore. The President enjoyed complete immunity from being sued by anyone, neither the Singaporean citizen nor the Malaysian citizen was entitled to sue the President. To the Right Honourable Chief Judge, the question of reciprocity did not arise, that it would be different if the citizen of Singapore was given the right to sue but such a right was not given to a citizen of Malaysia. It would then be contrary to the principle of comity of nations to confer upon the citizens of Singapore the right to sue the Yang di-Pertuan Agong and considered unlawful under article 155(1) of the Federal Constitution.

Chief Judge Tan Sri Annuar Zainal Abidin further argued that if article 155(1) of the Federal Constitution was to be understood as a restrictive piece of law, then its application would only be restricted to the citizens of Commonwealth countries, including Malaysia and Singapore. That being the case, Parliament was not restricted or prohibited from legislating a law conferring rights or privileges to non-citizens who are citizens of countries other than the Commonwealth. Except for the restriction in art 155(1), Parliament may by law confer rights or privileges to either citizens of Malaysia or to non-citizens who are citizens of countries other than the Commonwealth or to both citizens and non-citizens who are citizens of those countries.

The Honourable Chief Judge, however, implored that the court should confine its deliberations on the interpretation of the clear meaning of the law. Article 182 of the Federal Constitution did not state specifically who can sue a Ruler as the provisions of article 182 of the Federal Constitution emphasise on the fact that the Special Court has exclusive jurisdiction to try cases by or against the Yang di-Pertuan Agong or the Ruler of a State. The intention was to include all and not just citizens of Malaysia only and therefore, Parliament had opened the door for anyone, whether citizen or non-citizen, to bring a suit against a Malay Ruler in the Special Court.

Chief Judge Tan Sri Annuar Zainal Abidin asserted that if it was the intention of Parliament to restrict the right to bring a suit in the Special Court to citizens of Malaysia only, then the provisions of article 182 of the Federal Constitution would have been worded differently by expressly stating that the provisions apply only to citizens and to no one else. The Right Honourable Chief Judge noted that in the Federal Constitution, the word ‘persons’ and ‘citizens’ were used to give their specific meaning. These words were found in the Federal Constitution and used in different contexts. Where the word ‘citizens’ was used, it was clear that that provision applied to citizens only, and if the word ‘persons’ was used, then it referred to both citizens and non-citizens. Consequently, when the law is silent, and neither the word ‘citizens’,‘non-citizens’ nor ‘persons’ is used, then the law must have intended that the provisions apply to anybody.

The Right Honourable Chief Judge remarked that since article 182 of the Federal Constitution was a part of the Constitution itself, it must be distinguished from any other enactment promulgated by Parliament. An Act of Parliament which provided laws for the smooth administration of the government would naturally be subjected to the Federal Constitution. Thus, a provision in the Federal Constitution, unless otherwise clearly stated, would not be subject to the other provisions in the Federal Constitution itself.

Chief Judge Tan Sri Annuar Zainal Abidin also argued that article 181 of the Federal Constitution clearly prescribed that it was to be read ‘subject to the provisions of this Constitution’. There was no similar provision made in article 182 of the Federal Constitution whereas article 181 of the Federal Constitution must be construed subject to the other provisions in the Federal Constitution. Hence, article 182 of the Federal Constitution was not to be so construed and was, therefore, not subjected to article 155 of the Federal Constitution.

The Right Honourable Chief Judge, nonetheless, addressed that in a situation where the Special Court allowed the plaintiff to take proceedings against the Sultan of Pahang, she would not succeed in her claim. The plaintiff’s claim was in the nature of a libel lawsuit and that she was suing the Sultan of Pahang for a publication of a libellous statement in his affidavit. The plaintiff also claimed that it was libellous because the statement was made outside the jurisdiction of the court. Chief Judge Tan Sri Annuar Zainal Abidin disagreed, stating that even if the suit was filed in the court without jurisdiction, it was still a suit brought about in a court of law and therefore, whatever was said in the case would be protected under the principle of absolute privilege.

== Impact ==
The then Prime Minister of Malaysia, Tun Dr. Mahathir Mohamad opined that the government would consider amending the Constitution to explicitly allow foreign nationals to sue a Sultan "if the present legal provision is not serving justice"; however, no action was ever taken.
