= Eusoffe Abdoolcader =

Malaysian judge

Yang Berbahagia Tan Sri Dato' Eusoffe Abdoolcader

Judge of the Supreme Court of Malaysia
- In office 1974–1988

Personal details
- Born: Eusoffe Abdoolcader; 11 September 1924
- Died: 11 January 1996 (aged 71) Taman Jesselton, George town, Penang
- Spouse: Haseenah
- Parent: Sir Husein Hasanally Abdoolcader (father)
- Education: Penang Free School, University College London
- Profession: Barrister, Judge

Eusoffe Abdoolcader (11 September 1924 – 11 January 1996) was a Malaysian judge of the Federal Court from 1974 to 1988. Eusoffe was a respected lawyer and Supreme Court judge, remembered by his peers and juniors as perhaps the greatest judge Malaysia had seen.

== Education ==
At the age of 15, he passed his Senior Cambridge examinations with distinctions but he was too young to gain access to Raffles College in Singapore, which stipulated a minimum age of 17. He repeated his examinations and finally with his father's influence gained a seat at Raffles. He alleged that he was 'ragged' by Lee Kuan Yew.

Eusoffe studied law at University College London, graduating with an LL.B. First Class Honours.

== Legacy ==
As an advocate at the Bar, Abdoolcader was unsurpassed in his knowledge of the law and unmatchable in his advocacy, earning him a reputation as a formidable opponent. Lawyers and laymen alike were awed by his brilliance and his intellectual prowess, which he defused only by his dry sense of humour.

== Personal life ==
His father, Sir Husein Hasanally Abdoolcader, was a prominent lawyer, community leader and politician. Husein was a member of the Straits Settlements' Legislative Council and a member of the Advisory Council to the Governor of the Malayan Union. Husein also made a name for himself in the Straits Settlement as the first Malayan Indian to be knighted by King George VI in 1948. Eusoffe was married to Haseenah.

== Death ==
On 11 January 1996, following the death of his wife, Eusoffe committed suicide in his Taman Jesselton home by shooting himself in the heart.

== Honours ==
- Malaysia
  - Companion of the Order of the Defender of the Realm (JMN) (1966)
  - Commander of the Order of Loyalty to the Crown of Malaysia (PSM) - Tan Sri (1984)
- Penang
  - Companion of the Order of the Defender of State (DMPN) - Dato’
- Perak
  - Knight of the Order of Cura Si Manja Kini (DPCM) - Dato’ (1979)
  - Knight Grand Commander of the Order of the Perak State Crown (SPMP) - Dato’ Seri (1986)
- Kelantan
  - Knight Grand Commander of the Order of the Life of the Crown of Kelantan (SJMK) – Dato' (1989)
  - Recipient of the Order of the Most Distinguished and Most Valiant Warrior (PYGP) (1995)
