= Husein Hasanally Abdoolcader =

Malayan barrister and politician (1890–1974)

Husein Hasanally Abdoolcader Mama
- Born: 10 September 1890; Surat, British India
- Died: 16 June 1974 (aged 83)

Sir Husein Hasanally Abdoolcader Mama CBE (10 September 1890 – 16 June 1974) was a Malayan or Malaysian barrister and politician born in Surat, Bombay Presidency, British India. He was a Dawoodi Bohra by faith. His eldest son Tan Sri Eusoffe Abdoolcader was also a prominent figure in Malaya and a judge at the Supreme Court of Malaysia.

He was educated first in Malaya, at Raffles Institution, Singapore and Penang Free School, Penang. He was sent to England and went to Ilford County High School and Christ's College, Cambridge, then joined Lincoln's Inn.

== Career ==
He was:

- an Indian Member of the Straits Settlements Legislative Council from 1928 until the outbreak of the war with Japan;
- a member of the Advisory Council of the Governor of The Malayan Union;
- a member of the Indian Immigration Committee, 1935–1953;
- President of the Third All Malaya Indian Conference, 1929–1930;
- Indian Member of the Municipal Commission, Georgetown, Penang, 1925–1951;
- President of the Penang Society for Prevention of Cruelty to Animals;
- President of the Mohammedan Football Association of Malaya.
- A J.P and officiated as the Imam of the Dawoodi Bohra Community in Penang

He is the first Indian in Malaya to receive a knighthood and was once threatened with execution by the Japanese. Throughout the Japanese occupation of Singapore during WW2, Sir Husein was under suspicion for his pro-allied sympathies. The Kempeitai eventually arrested him and soon announced that he was to be beheaded. They blindfolded him, made him kneel, then brought out a sword. Sir Husein made one request: he asked to see his family again. But the Japanese did not execute him. He survived the war and was knighted.

== Awards/Honours ==
He was awarded the George V Silver Jubilee Medal, 1935, and the George VI Coronation Medal, 1937. He was made a CBE in 1938 and knighted in 1948.
