= Wan Hisham =

Malaysian politician

Yang Berbahagia Dato' Wan Hisham Wan Salleh DPMT DJN SMT AMN PJK
- وان هشام وان صالح

Member of the Terengganu State Executive Council

Infrastructure Development, Public Service and Communication
- In office 25 March 2004 – 8 April 2008
- Monarch: Mizan Zainal Abidin
- Menteri Besar: Idris Jusoh
- Preceded by: Yahaya Ali
- Succeeded by: Yahaya Khatib Mohamad (Infrastructure Development and Public Service); Khazan Che Mat (Communication)
- Constituency: Ladang

Member of the Terengganu State Legislative Assembly for Ladang
- In office 21 March 2004 – 5 May 2013
- Preceded by: Sulaiman Abdullah (PAS)
- Succeeded by: Tengku Hassan Tengku Omar (PAS)
- Majority: 1,041 (2004); 31 (2008)

Personal details
- Born: Wan Hisham bin Wan Salleh; 16 May 1956 (age 70) Kemaman, Terengganu, Federation of Malaya (now Malaysia)
- Party: United Malays National Organisation (UMNO)
- Other political affiliations: Barisan Nasional (BN)
- Spouse: Wan Hasnah Wan Ismail
- Relations: Wan Ahmad Farid Wan Salleh (younger brother)
- Children: 4
- Education: Sekolah Dato' Abdul Razak; United World College of South East Asia
- Alma mater: University of East Anglia (BEc); University of Putra Malaysia (MEc)
- Occupation: Businessman, politician

Wan Hisham bin Wan Salleh is a Malaysian politician who was a member of Terengganu State Executive Council in Malaysia. He served the State Infrastructure Development, Public Service and Communication Committee portfolio. He is also the chairman of T-Best Events, a State Government owned company which organised the Monsoon Cup in Duyong, Terengganu. In the Monsoon Cup, he has managed to bring big sponsors to Terengganu namely BMW, RICHARD MILLE, MasterCard, Air Asia, TM, ASTRO and ESPN in supporting the event putting Terengganu on international TV. Apart from the Monsoon Cup success, he also had improved the state transportation system bringing East Coast Expressway connecting Terengganu to the west coast of Peninsular Malaysia cutting the time needed from 9 hours to 3 hours drive from Kuala Terengganu to Kuala Lumpur, the capital of Malaysia. He has also upgraded the airport, providing education programme for the suburban and elderly people on Information Technology, building free houses for the under poverty and recently has brought Terry Thoren to the state to start Animation Development Programme which is expecting to provide 4,000 work opportunities in the state every year in animation and 3D industry.

== Early life and education ==
Wan Hisham bin Wan Salleh was born at Kemaman, Terengganu, Federation of Malaya (now Malaysia) on 16 May 1956. His younger brother, Wan Ahmad Farid Wan Salleh was the 11th Chief Justice of Malaysia since July 2025. He received his early education at the Sultan Sulaiman 1 Primary School, Kuala Terengganu and Sekolah Dato' Abdul Razak, Seremban, Negeri Sembilan, before further his studies at the United World College of South East Asia, Singapore (1974–1976). When he was in United World College of South East Asia, he was awarded the 1st Class Ambassador Award for his all round achievement during his study. He later received his Bachelor of Economics (BEc) from the University of East Anglia (1976–1979). He also have his Master of Economics (MEc) from the Universiti Putra Malaysia (UPM).

== Political career ==
Dato' Wan Hisham won the Ladang State Assembly Seat in General Election in 2004 defeating Dr. Sulaiman from the opposition party of PAS allowing Barisan Nasional win 28 out of 32 seats in Terengganu seeing the Barisan Nasional taking over the State Government from the previous ruling party, PAS. He was then appointed by the Menteri Besar Idris Jusoh to join the State Executive Council holding the State Infrastructure Development, Public Service and Communication Committee portfolio due to his academic qualification and his vast experience in construction business. He was also then elected as the UMNO Treasurer for the state. However, he lost his seat in the 12th Malaysian General Election with a majority of 31 votes.

== Other activities ==
As part of his interest in Scuba diving and holding PADI Advanced Open Diver licence, Dato' Wan Hisham is the current Advisor of Malaysian Coral Preservation Society (CoRal Malaysia) and Sahabat Alam (SELAM) which are currently the leading societies in preserving corals and maritime lives in Malaysia. Under his wing, CoRal Malaysia held 3 Malaysian Book of Record for underwater achievement namely The First Underwater Gallery in Pulau Bidong, Terengganu, The Biggest Underwater Painting in Pulau Kapas, Terengganu and The Biggest Underwater Flag Hoisting in Pulau Perhentian, Terengganu.

== Election results ==
Terengganu State Legislative Assembly
| Year | Constituency | Candidate | Votes | Pct | Opponent(s) | Votes | Pct | Ballots cast | Majority | Turnout |
|---|---|---|---|---|---|---|---|---|---|---|
| 2004 | N15 Ladang | Wan Hisham Wan Salleh (UMNO) | 6,981 | 54.03% | Sulaiman Abdullah (PAS) | 5,940 | 45.97% | 13,080 | 1,041 | 83.44% |
| 2008 | N15 Ladang | Wan Hisham Wan Salleh (UMNO) | 6,692 | 50.12% | Tengku Hassan Tengku Omar (PAS) | 6,723 | 49.88% | 13,701 | 31 | 81.67% |

== Honours ==
=== Honours of Malaysia ===
- Malaysia
  - Member of the Order of the Defender of the Realm (AMN) (2001)
- Penang
  - Member of the Order of the Defender of State (DJN)
- Terengganu
  - Knight Commander of the Order of the Crown of Terengganu (DPMT) – Dato' (2006)
  - Companion of the Order of the Crown of Terengganu (SMT)
  - Recipient of the Meritorious Service Medal (PJK)
