= Royal Commission of Inquiry into the Lingam Video Clip =

2007 Malaysian royal commission

The Royal Commission of Inquiry into the V. K. Lingam Video Clip was formed in late 2007 to investigate into an allegation of illegal intervention into the judicial appointment process of Malaysian judges purportedly occurred in 2002. The formation of the commission was a follow-up to a recommendation by a three-man panel which was tasked to determine the authenticity of a video clip of a telephone conversation that raised the allegation.

The allegation was first made public in September 2007 by former Deputy Prime Minister of Malaysia Anwar Ibrahim who released a low quality video showing lawyer V. K. Lingam allegedly talking to former Chief Judge of Malaya Ahmad Fairuz Abdul Halim about the appointment of the latter into the office of Chief Justice of the Federal Court. Ahmad Fairuz retired as the Chief Justice of the Federal Court in late 2007 after his tenure was not renewed due to objection from the Conference of Rulers.

== Proceedings ==
The Royal Commission began with the purpose of investigating the purported tampering in the appointment of judges following the release of a widely circulated (including on YouTube) eight-minute video clip featuring what appears to be a well-connected senior lawyer, V. K. Lingam, purportedly discussing promotions and factionalism among senior judges over the phone with Ahmad Fairuz Sheikh Abdul Halim, the number 3 judge in the country at the time the clip was recorded on a mobile phone in 2002. Lingam is also seen apparently talking to Fairuz about the latter's own rise within the judiciary. At the time the video was released on 19 September 2007,

Ahmad Fairuz was already the Chief Justice of Malaysia, but his four-year tenure as Chief Justice was due to expire 31 October 2007. His tenure was not extended, and his post was taken over by Abdul Hamid Mohamad. The lawyer is also heard saying that he had discussed the judiciary with tycoon Vincent Tan and another prominent ruling party politician. The conversation suggests that certain top judges are closely connected with the country's top leaders via political intermediaries and business cronies. The minister in the Prime Minister's Department, Mohamed Nazri Abdul Aziz, has said that the judge implicated in the video clip had called him to deny that he was the one talking to the lawyer.

On 15 January 2008, the Royal Commission began their inquiry of a video that alleges political interference in judicial appointments and the manipulation of high-profile cases. On 17 January 2008, Mahathir was brought before a Royal Commission that look the manipulation of top judicial appointments during his administration, a scandal that has cast doubts about the independence of Malaysia's judiciary. He was made to testify before a government inquiry into a secretly recorded video clip that showed a man believed to be a prominent lawyer, V. K. Lingam, boasting that he could get key judicial appointments made with Mahathir's help. Throughout the inquiry Mahathir denied collusion with V. K. Lingam and sometimes forgot key timelines. Continuing with the inquiries, former Chief Justice of Malaysia Tun Mohamed Eusoff Chin was called before the Commission whereby he denied he was a close acquaintance of the lawyer V. K. Lingam even though he took a vacation with him to New Zealand.

Lingam was also called before the Royal Commission, where he claim he did not recall the phone conversation he made to Ahmad Fairuz. He said he might have been drunk at that time and denied he had ever tried to influence judicial appointments. Vincent Tan who was next was questioned about his influence on former Prime Minister Mahathir Mohamad and he denied that he ever discussed judicial appointments with Mahathir. He rebutted Mahathir's claims that he might have consulted with Tan over judicial appointments.

A new revelation appeared showing PKR President Anwar Ibrahim releasing a third video clip purportedly showing Lingam talking about having dinner with and buying an expensive gift for former Chief Justice Tun Mohamed Dzaiddin Abdullah. Anwar said he was disappointed the Royal Commission which focused solely on the fixing of judges and did not allow evidence that court decisions had also been fixed. Anwar also claimed that there was a third video clip that implicated more judges in the judiciary.

== Terms of reference ==
The Commission had a specific scope it had to explore. The scope includes:

- to certify the authenticity of the clip
- to identify the participants of the telephone conversation as well as persons mentioned in the conversation
- to ascertain the truth of the content of the conversation
- to determine whether the participants of the conversation as well as names mentioned committed any wrongdoing
- to recommend action against the participants of the conversation as well as names mentioned.

== Membership ==
The 5-person commission was chaired by former Chief Judge of Malaya Haidar Mohamed Noor. The other four members were former Chief Judge of Sabah and Sarawak Steve Shim Lip Kiong, former Solicitor-General Zaitun Zawiyah Puteh, historian Khoo Kay Kim and retired Court of Appeal Judge Mahadev Shankar.

Members of the commission were appointed by Prime Minister Abdullah Ahmad Badawi.

== The Report ==
The report is available for download and viewing online.

== See also ==
- Judiciary of Malaysia
- 1988 Malaysian constitutional crisis
- 2025 Malaysian judicial appointment controversy
