= Tengku Hassan Tengku Omar =

Malaysian politician

Yang Mulia Dato' Tengku Hassan Tengku Omar DPMT PJC PJK BLB
- تڠكو حسن بن تڠكو عمر

Member of the Terengganu State Executive Council (Trade, Industry, Regional Development and Administration Wellbeing)
- In office 10 May 2018 – 12 August 2023
- Monarch: Mizan Zainal Abidin
- Menteri Besar: Ahmad Samsuri Mokhtar
- Deputy: Muhammad Khalil Abdul Hadi
- Preceded by: Tengku Putra Tengku Awang (Trade and Industry); Nawi Mohamad (Regional Development); A Latiff Awang (Administration Wellbeing)
- Constituency: Ladang

Member of the Terengganu State Legislative Assembly for Ladang
- In office 5 May 2013 – 12 August 2023
- Preceded by: Wan Hisham Wan Salleh (BN–UMNO)
- Succeeded by: Zuraida Md Noor (PN–PAS)
- Majority: 924 (2013); 363 (2018)

Faction represented in Terengganu State Legislative Assembly
- 2013–2020: Malaysian Islamic Party
- 2020–2023: Perikatan Nasional

Personal details
- Born: Tengku Hassan bin Tengku Omar; 1 January 1951 (age 75) Kerteh, Terengganu, Malaysia
- Citizenship: Malaysian
- Party: Malaysian Islamic Party (PAS)
- Other political affiliations: Angkatan Perpaduan Ummah (APU) (1990-1996); Barisan Antenatif (BA) (1999-2008); Pakatan Rakyat (PR) (2008-2015); Gagasan Sejahtera (GS) (2016-2020); Perikatan Nasional (PN) (since 2020)
- Spouse: Toh Puan Hajjah Fatimah Bt. Chik (Allahyarhamah). Hajjah Aida Bt. Tengah
- Children: 4 sons 2 daughter: YM Tengku Mohd Hafiz YM Tengku Fatin Nadiah YM Dato Tengku Mohd Hilmi YM Tengku Mohd Hazwan YM Tengku Fatin Najihah YM Tengku Mohd Hanif
- Education: Universiti Malaya; University of Nottingham
- Occupation: Politician 2008-2021: Politician as State Assemblyman of Ladang Constituency; 2005-2008: Federal Government Contractor (Penang E-Land Project); 1980-2005: Government Servant.
- Profession: 2018 - Terengganu State Executive Council - EXCO 2008 - State Assemblyman of Ladang Constituency 2004 - Pegawai Kewangan Negeri 2002 - Pengarah Tanah dan Galian (PTG) Terengganu 1999 - Timbalan Setiausaha Kerajaan (Pembangunan) Terengganu 1998 - Ketua Pegawai Eksekutif, Majlis Agama Islam & Adat Melayu (MAIDAM) Terengganu 1995 - Pegawai Daerah Besut 1992 - Ketua Penolong Setiausaha Kerajaan (Perjawatan & Perkhidmatan) 1988 - Pesuruhjaya Hal Ehwal Agama (JHEAT) Terengganu 1988 - Ketua Penolong Pentadbir Tanah Hulu Terengganu 1987 - Ketua Penolong Pegawai Daerah Hulu Terengganu 1985 - Pegawai Projek Kanan, INTAN Wilayah Timur, Kemaman 1985 - Pengarah Unit Perancang Ekonomi Negeri (UPEN) Terengganu 1981 - Penolong Pengarah Unit Perancang Ekonomi Negeri (UPEN) Terengganu

Tengku Hassan bin Tengku Omar is a Malaysian politician who served as Member of the Terengganu State Executive Council (EXCO) in the Perikatan Nasional (PN) state administration under Menteri Besar Ahmad Samsuri Mokhtar for portfolio Trade, Industry, Regional Development and Administrative Wellbeing starting May 2018 as well as Member of the Terengganu State Legislative Assembly (MLA) for Ladang from May 2013 to August 2023. He is a member of the Malaysian Islamic Party (PAS), a component party of the PN and formerly Pakatan Rakyat (PR) coalitions.

Former Terengganu Director of Lands and Mines (PTG), Datuk Tengku Hassan Tengku Omar held for three terms as Ladang ADUN.

He received his highest education in economics from the University of Malaya and graduated from the University of Nottingham, United Kingdom in district administration.

Tengku Hassan also attended Sekolah Menengah (SM) Sultan Sulaiman Kuala Terengganu and SM Sultan Ismail Kemaman.

He was born on 1 January 1951 in Kerteh Kemaman and worked as a Terengganu State Financial Officer, Director of the Terengganu State Economic Planning Unit (UPEN) and Besut District Officer.

Tengku Hasan, who also has extensive experience in the field of district administration, has held positions such as Chief Assistant Land Administrator of Hulu Terengganu and Chief Assistant District Officer of Hulu Terengganu.

Not only that, he has also been appointed Chairman of A&W Malaysia, Singapore and Thailand and Chairman of Terengganu Safety Training Center (TSTC).

In the field of entrepreneurship, Tengku Hassan once held the responsibility as the Executive Director of the Entrepreneur Development Foundation (YPU).

At the state level, he was appointed EXCO for Trade, Industry, Regional Development and Administrative Welfare since 2018 while at the political level, he is a Member of the Terengganu State Pass Liaison Committee.

== Election results ==
Terengganu State Legislative Assembly
Year	Constituency	Candidate	Votes	Pct	Opponent(s)	Votes	Pct	Ballots cast	Majority	Turnout
2008	N15 Ladang	Tengku Hassan Tengku Omar (PAS)	6,723	49.88%	Wan Hisham Wan Salleh (UMNO)	6,692	50.12%	13,701	31	81.67%
2013	N15 Ladang	Tengku Hassan Tengku Omar (PAS)	9,066	52.68%	Wan Ahmad Farid Wan Salleh (UMNO)	8,142	47.32%	17,373	924	86.70%
2018	N15 Ladang	Tengku Hassan Tengku Omar (PAS)	8,201	43.44%	Mohd Sabri Alwi (UMNO)	7,838	41.53%	19,146	363	84.80%
2018	N15 Ladang	Tengku Hassan Tengku Omar (PAS)	8,201	43.44%	Zulkifli Mohamad (PPBM)	2,836	15.03%	19,146	363	84.80%

== Honours ==
- Terengganu
  - Recipient of the Long Service and Good Conduct Star (BLB)
  - Recipient of the Meritorious Service Medal (PJK)
  - Recipient of the Distinguished Service Medal (PJC)
  - Knight Commander of the Order of the Crown of Terengganu (DPMT) – Dato' (1998)
