= Wan Ahmad Farid Wan Salleh =

Chief Justice of Malaysia since 2025 (born 1962)

Yang Amat Arif Tun Wan Ahmad Farid Wan Salleh SSM SPMS SAAS SPSK SSMZ SPDK DUNM DPMT SMT
- وان أحمد فريد وان صالح
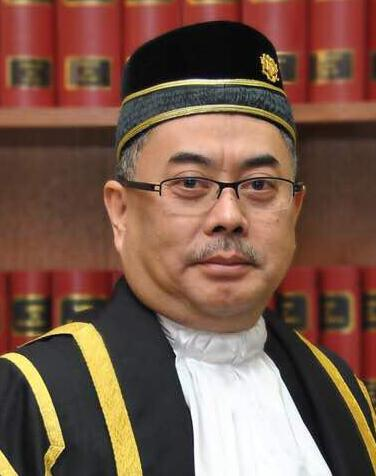
- Wan Ahmad Farid in 2019

11th Chief Justice of Malaysia
- Incumbent
- Assumed office 28 July 2025
- Nominated by: Anwar Ibrahim
- Appointed by: Ibrahim
- Monarch: Ibrahim
- Prime Minister: Anwar Ibrahim
- Preceded by: Hasnah Mohammed Hashim (acting); Tengku Maimun Tuan Mat

Deputy Minister of Home Affairs I
- In office 19 March 2008 – January 2009 Serving with Chor Chee Heung
- Prime Minister: Abdullah Ahmad Badawi
- Minister: Syed Hamid Albar
- Preceded by: Tan Chai Ho
- Succeeded by: Abu Seman Yusop

Senator

Elected by the Terengganu State Legislative Assembly
- In office 23 December 2005 – January 2009 Serving with Nordiana Shafie
- Monarchs: Syed Sirajuddin (2005–2006); Mizan Zainal Abidin (2006–2009)
- Prime Minister: Abdullah Ahmad Badawi
- Preceded by: Hassan Shukri
- Succeeded by: Zainun A. Bakar

Personal details
- Born: 13 November 1962 (age 64) Kuala Terengganu, Terengganu, Federation of Malaya (now Malaysia)
- Citizenship: Malaysia
- Party: United Malays National Organisation (UMNO) (until 2013)
- Other political affiliations: Barisan Nasional (BN) (until 2013)
- Spouse: Intan Baizura Abdul Wahab
- Relations: Wan Hisham Wan Salleh (elder brother)
- Children: 6
- Education: Thames Valley University (LLB); University of Malaya (CLP)
- Occupation: Politician
- Profession: Judge

Wan Ahmad Farid bin Wan Salleh (Jawi: وان أحمد فريد بن وان صالح; born 13 November 1962) is a Malaysian judge and politician who is serving as the 11th Chief Justice of Malaysia since 28 July 2025. He previously served as the Deputy Minister of Home Affairs I from March 2008 to January 2009 in Prime Minister Abdullah Ahmad Badawi last cabinet and served as a Senator from December 2005 to January 2009.

== Early life and education ==
Wan Ahmad Farid bin Wan Salleh was born on 13 November 1962 in Kuala Terengganu, Terengganu, Federation of Malaya (now Malaysia). He is the younger brother of Wan Hisham Wan Salleh, who was a member of the Terengganu State Executive Council in the Infrastructure Development, Public Service and Communication portfolio from March 2004 to April 2008 and member of the Terengganu State Legislative Assembly for Ladang from March 2004 to May 2013. He received his Bachelor of Laws (LLB) from the Thames Valley University, London in 1985. The following year, he obtained a Certificate in Legal Practice (CLP) from the University of Malaya.

== Political career ==
Wan Ahmad Farid was a member of the United Malays National Organisation (UMNO) until 2013. He served as the UMNO Deputy Division Chief of Kuala Terengganu in 2001. In 2004, he was appointed Political Secretary to the Minister of Internal Security, where he held the position until 2008. He was subsequently elected as a senator by the Terengganu State Legislative Assembly on 23 December 2005. Three years later, he was selected by Prime Minister Abdullah Ahmad Badawi to serve as the Deputy Minister of Home Affairs I, alongside Chor Chee Heung as the Deputy Minister of Home Affairs II.

In the 2009 Kuala Terengganu by-election, Wan Ahmad Farid lost to Malaysian Islamic Party candidate, Mohd Abdul Wahid Endut. He received 30,552 votes, compared to Mohd Abdul Wahid's 32,883 votes. Another candidate, Azharudin Mamat @ Adam, who stood as an independent, received only 193 votes. The by-election was held following the death of the incumbent Member of Parliament, Razali Ismail.

== Legal career ==
Wan Ahmad Farid began his first steps as an advocate and solicitor at Tetuan Adnan & Wee, Kuala Terengganu from 1987 until 2003. He returned to the legal profession after serving as a deputy cabinet minister as an advocate and solicitor at Tetuan Wan Farid & Surin, Kuala Lumpur from 2010 to 2015.

Wan Ahmad Farid also served in the Kuala Lumpur High Court and the Kota Bharu High Court from 2015 to 2019. Throughout his tenure as a High Court Judge, he was assigned to the Kota Bharu High Court, Shah Alam High Court (Special Powers Division) and Kuala Lumpur High Court (Special Powers Division 3).

Wan Ahmad Farid was appointed a judicial commissioner in 2015 and later served as a High Court judge from 2019 to 2024. Among his high-profile decisions was his withdrawal from hearing an application to allow a British Queen's Counsel (QC) to represent former Prime Minister Najib Razak in an appeal concerning the RM42 million SRC International corruption case. Wan Ahmad Farid cited a conflict of interest, stating that a member of his family was affiliated with Najib's political party, UMNO.

On 11 May 2023, Wan Ahmad Farid ruled that the children of single mother Loh Siew Hong had been legally converted to Islam under Perlis state law, referencing an affidavit from the state Islamic authority which confirmed that the children had recited the Shahadah in 2020.

In another landmark decision in November 2024, Wan Ahmad Farid ordered the police to complete their investigation into the 2009 death of Teoh Beng Hock within six months, deeming the delay in the investigation excessive. He had earlier ruled in favour of a judicial review filed by Teoh's family.

On 18 July 2025, Wan Ahmad Farid was announced as the new Chief Justice of Malaysia, succeeding Tengku Maimun Tuan Mat, who retired on 2 July. He was officially sworn into the office on 28 July before King of Malaysia Sultan Ibrahim at Istana Negara.

== Personal life ==
Wan Ahmad Farid is married to Intan Baizura Abdul Wahab and has six children. He is a supporter of Tottenham Hotspur.

== Election results ==
Parliament of Malaysia
Year	Constituency	Candidate	Votes	Pct	Opponent(s)	Votes	Pct	Ballots cast	Majority	Turnout
2009	P036 Kuala Terengganu	Wan Ahmad Farid Wan Salleh (UMNO)	30,252	47.77%	Mohd Abdul Wahid Endut (PAS)	32,883	51.92%	63,993	2,631	79.76%
2009	P036 Kuala Terengganu	Wan Ahmad Farid Wan Salleh (UMNO)	30,252	47.77%	Azharuddin Mamat (IND)	193	0.30%	63,993	2,631	79.76%

Terengganu State Legislative Assembly
Year	Constituency	Candidate	Votes	Pct	Opponent(s)	Votes	Pct	Ballots cast	Majority	Turnout
2013	N15 Ladang	Wan Ahmad Farid Wan Salleh (UMNO)	8,142	47.32%	Tengku Hassan Tengku Omar (PAS)	9,066	52.68%	17,373	924	86.70%

== Honours ==
=== Honours of Malaysia ===
- Malaysia
  - Grand Commander of the Order of Loyalty to the Crown of Malaysia (SSM) – Tun (2026)
- Kelantan
  - Knight Grand Commander of the Order of Loyalty to the Crown of Kelantan (SPSK) – Dato' (2025)
- Malacca
  - Knight Grand Commander of the Premier and Exalted Order of Malacca (DUNM) – Datuk Seri Utama (2025)
- Pahang
  - Knight Grand Companion of the Order of Al-Sultan Abdullah of Pahang (SAAS) – Dato' Sri Setia (2026)
- Sabah
  - Grand Commander of the Order of Kinabalu (SPDK) – Datuk Seri Panglima (2026)
- Selangor
  - Knight Grand Commander of the Order of the Crown of Selangor (SPMS) – Dato' Seri (2026)
  - Recipient of the Sultan Sharafuddin Silver Jubilee Medal (2026)
- Terengganu
  - Knight Grand Companion of the Order of Sultan Mizan Zainal Abidin of Terengganu (SSMZ) – Dato' Seri (2026)
  - Knight Commander of the Order of the Crown of Terengganu (DPMT) – Dato' (1996)
  - Companion of the Order of the Crown of Terengganu (SMT) (1994)

== See also ==
- Members of the Dewan Negara, 11th Malaysian Parliament
