= Territorial nexus =

Territorial nexus is a concept described in Article 245 of the Constitution of India that determines how legislative powers are divided.

Article 245 provides, inter alia, that (subject to the provisions of the Constitution).

"(i) Parliament may make laws for the whole or any part of the territory of India and (ii) the legislature of a State may make laws for the whole or any part of the State.

Thus, the article 245 sets out the limits of the legislative powers of the Union and the States from the geographical (or territorial) angle. From the point of view of the subject matter of legislation, it is article 246 which is important. Article 246 reads as under:

"246(1) Notwithstanding anything in clauses (2) and (3), Parliament has exclusive power to make laws with respect to any of the matters enumerated in List 1 of the Seventh Schedule (in this Constitution, referred to as the "Union List").

(2) Notwithstanding anything in clause (3), Parliament, and subject to clause (1), the Legislature of any State also, shall have power to make laws with respect to any of the matters enumerated in List III in the Seventh Schedule (in this Constitution, referred to as the "Concurrent List"). (3) Subject to clauses (1) and (2), the Legislature of any State has exclusive power to make laws for such State or any part thereof with respect to any of the matters enumerated in List II in the Seventh Schedule (in this Constitution, referred to as the "State List").

(4) Parliament has power to make laws with respect to any matter for any part of the territory of India not included in a State, notwithstanding that such matter is a matter enumerated in the State List".".

— PART XI of Indian Constitution, RELATIONS BETWEEN THE UNION AND THE STATES, LEGISLATIVE RELATIONS, Distribution of Legislative Powers Article 245

== Leading cases ==
- Tata Iron and Steel Company vs. Bihar State (AIR 1958 SC 452)
- State of Bihar Vs. Sm. Charusila Dasi (AIR 1959 SC 1002)
- The State Of Bombay vs R. M. D. Chamarbaugwala (1957 AIR 699, 1957 SCR 874)
