= Richard Malanjum =

Malaysian lawyer

Yang Amat Berbahagia Tun Datuk Seri Panglima Richard Malanjum SSM SPDK SPSK SSAP PSM SIMP PGDK

9th Chief Justice of Malaysia
- In office 11 July 2018 – 12 April 2019
- Nominated by: Mahathir Mohamad
- Appointed by: Muhammad V
- Preceded by: Mohamed Raus Sharif
- Succeeded by: Tengku Maimun Tuan Mat

4th Chief Judge of Sabah and Sarawak
- In office 26 July 2006 – 11 July 2018
- Nominated by: Abdullah Ahmad Badawi
- Appointed by: Sirajuddin
- Preceded by: Steve Shim Lip Kiong
- Succeeded by: David Wong Dak Wah

Personal details
- Born: Richard Malanjum; 13 October 1952 (age 74) Tuaran, Crown Colony of North Borneo (now Sabah, Malaysia)
- Spouse: Toh Puan Charlene Jintoni
- Relations: Marcus Mojigoh (third cousin)
- Children: 3
- Education: MARA University of Technology; University of London (LLB); Gray's Inn
- Profession: Lawyer

Richard Malanjum (born 13 October 1952) is a Malaysian lawyer who served as the ninth Chief Justice of Malaysia and fourth Chief Judge of Sabah and Sarawak. Before joining the judicial service, he was a practising lawyer and was the president of the Sabah Law Association, the bar association for the state of Sabah.

== Education ==
He had his early education in Tuaran (he was only born there but brought up in his hometown of Putatan in the Penampang district, where both his parents are originally from as either his father or mother was stationed in the above district due to a job post with the colonial government) which caused his mother to give birth to him in that district, what more spending his partial childhood and teenage years before completing his secondary education at La Salle Secondary School, Kota Kinabalu.

In 1972, he graduated from the MARA Institute of Technology (now Universiti Teknologi MARA) in Shah Alam, Selangor as an external student at the University of London and obtained a Bachelor of Laws (LL.B) in 1975. He then furthered his studies in London and managed to complete his Bar-at-Law study the following year.

== Career ==
He started his career as a clerk at the Education Department, Department of Agriculture, Television and Radio Department before moving on as a Welfare Officer at the State Welfare Department.

Having obtained a law degree, Malanjum served at the Sabah Chief Minister's Department and was assigned as Deputy Public Prosecutor at the Sabah State Attorney-General's Chambers.

He was also admitted to the English Bar of the Honourable Society of Gray's Inn in London.

Upon his return to Malaysia, Malanjum continued his service as deputy public prosecutor and senior legal counsel at the Sabah State Attorney-General's Chambers.

In 1977, he was a solicitor with the Malaysian Bar, Sabah and was admitted to the Australian Capital Territory Bar in 1991.

In 1981, Malanjum resigned from his post at the Sabah State Attorney-General's Chambers and joined a legal firm in Kota Kinabalu where he became Sabah Law Association president.

Later, he was appointed judicial commissioner in early 1992.

In 2006, for the first time since the formation of Malaysia, he became the first Sabahan elevated as Chief Judge of Sabah and Sarawak, the fourth most senior judicial office in Malaysia. Prior to that, the post was held by a British, one from Peninsular Malaysia and several Sarawakians.

He was sworn-in as the ninth Chief Justice of Malaysia, the highest judicial officer in Malaysia on 11 July 2018, becoming the first person from the Borneo states of Malaysia to ascend to the office. He retired as Chief Justice on 13 April 2019 having reached the mandatory retirement age.

On 28 January 2022, he was appointed by the Secretary-General as the Ombudsperson of the United Nations' Security Council. He assumed his official functions on 14 February 2022.

On 6 December 2025, he was appointed pro-chancellor of Multimedia University.

== Landmark court cases ==
Called a “fearless and staunch defender of the integrity of the Federal Constitution and fundamental liberties” by Retired Court of Appeal judge Datuk Hishamudin Yunus for his dissenting judgements whilst in Federal Court, Richard was claimed to have made 'brave' judgements in the controversial cases of Lina Joy (2007) in which he had adjudged the insistence by the National Registration Department for a certificate of apostasy from the Federal Territory Syariah Court was not only unlawful but also unreasonable, The Herald/Allah Case (2014) “According to Justice Richard Malanjum, there were merits in the applicant's contention that the Minister's decision contravened Article 11(1) and (3) of the Federal Constitution, and therefore leave to appeal to the Federal Court ought to be granted (whereas in this case leave to appeal to the Federal Court was refused by the Federal Court).”Richard had also made separate judgements in other cases including Public Prosecutor vs Koh Wah Kuan (2007), Sivarasa Rasiah vs Badan Peguam Malaysia (2010), M. Indira Gandhi vs Pengarah Jabatan Agama Islam Perak and others (2018) and Alma Nudo Atenza v Public Prosecutor (The double presumption case) (2019).

== Honours ==
- Malaysia
  - Grand Commander of the Order of Loyalty to the Crown of Malaysia (SSM) – Tun (2020)
  - Commander of the Order of Loyalty to the Crown of Malaysia (PSM) – Tan Sri (2008)
- Kelantan
  - Knight Grand Commander of the Order of the Loyalty to the Crown of Kelantan (SPSK) – Dato' (2006)
- Pahang
  - Knight Grand Companion of the Order of Sultan Ahmad Shah of Pahang (SSAP) – Dato' Sri (2006)
  - Knight Grand Companion of the Order of the Crown of Pahang (SIMP) – Dato' Indera (2004)
- Sabah
  - Grand Commander of the Order of Kinabalu (SPDK) – Datuk Seri Panglima (2006)
  - Commander of the Order of Kinabalu (PGDK) – Datuk (1998)

Legal offices
| Preceded by Mohamed Raus Sharif | Chief Justice of Malaysia; 2018–2019 | Succeeded by Tengku Maimun Tuan Mat |
| Preceded by Steve Shim Lip Kiong | Chief Judge of Sabah and Sarawak; 2006–2018 | Succeeded by David Wong Dak Wah |
