= Ladang =

Political subdivision in Malaysia

Ladang (N15)
Terengganu constituency

State constituency
- Legislature: Terengganu State Legislative Assembly
MLA
Zuraida Md Noor
PN
- Constituency created: 1959
- First contested: 1959
- Last contested: 2023

Demographics
- Electors (2023): 26,250

N15 Ladang within Terengganu, as used for the 2023 state election

Ladang is a state constituency in Terengganu, Malaysia, that has been represented in the Terengganu State Legislative Assembly.

The state constituency was first contested in 1959 and is mandated to return a single Assemblyman to the Terengganu State Legislative Assembly under the first-past-the-post voting system.

== Demographics ==
Ethnic breakdown of Ladang's electorate as of 2023
1. Malay (89.3%)
2. Chinese (8.92%)
3. Indian (0.95%)
4. Other ethnicities (0.85%)

== History ==
=== Polling districts ===
According to the Gazette issued on 30 March 2018, the Ladang constituency has a total of 8 polling districts.

State Constituency	Polling Districts	Code	Location
Ladang (N15)	Ladang	036/15/01	SK Ladang
Ladang (N15)	Tekukur	036/15/02	SK Sultan Sulaiman 1
Ladang (N15)	Batas Baru	036/15/03	SK Sultan Sulaiman 2
Ladang (N15)	Gong Kapas	036/15/04	SK Gong Kapas
Ladang (N15)	Pasir Panjang	036/15/05	SK Tengku Bariah
Ladang (N15)	Bukit Bayas	036/15/06	SK Bukit Batas
Ladang (N15)	Bukit Besar	036/15/07	SK Pusat Bukit Besar
Ladang (N15)	Gong Gemia	036/15/08	SK Seri Budiman

=== Representation history ===
Members of the Legislative Assembly for Ladang
Assembly	No	Years	Member	Party
Constituency created
1st	N11	1959–1964	Wan Daud Wan Ahmad	Negara
2nd	N11	1964–1969	Wan Daud Wan Ahmad	Alliance (UMNO)
		1969–1971	Assembly dissolved	
3rd	N11	1971–1974	Wan Mohamed Wan Ngah	PMIP
3rd	N11	1973-1974	Wan Mohamed Wan Ngah	BN (PMIP)
4th	N18	1974–1978	Abu Bakar Daud	BN (UMNO)
5th	N18	1978–1982	Abu Bakar Daud	BN (UMNO)
6th	N18	1982–1986	Abu Bakar Daud	BN (UMNO)
7th	N14	1986–1990	Abu Bakar Daud	BN (UMNO)
8th	N14	1990–1995	Abu Bakar Daud	BN (UMNO)
9th	N15	1995–1999	Roslan Awang Chik	BN (UMNO)
10th	N15	1999–2004	Sulaiman Abdullah	PAS
11th	N15	2004–2008	Wan Hisham	BN (UMNO)
12th	N15	2008–2013	Tengku Hassan Tengku Omar	PR (PAS)
13th	N15	2013–2018	Tengku Hassan Tengku Omar	PR (PAS)
14th	N15	2018–2020	Tengku Hassan Tengku Omar	PAS
14th	N15	2020–2023	Tengku Hassan Tengku Omar	PN (PAS)
15th	N15	2023–present	Zuraida Md Noor	PN (PAS)

== Election results ==
Terengganu state election, 2023: Ladang
Party	Candidate	Votes	%	∆%
PAS	Zuraida Md Noor	11,663	61.54	▲18.09
BN	Mohd Sabri Azmi	7,290	38.46	▼3.06
Total valid votes		18,953	100.00	
Total rejected ballots		161		
Unreturned ballots		22		
Turnout		19,136	72.90	▼11.93
Registered electors		26,250		
Majority		4,373	23.07	▲21.15
PAS hold		Swing		
Source(s) Astro Awani

Terengganu state election, 2018: Ladang
Party	Candidate	Votes	%	∆%
PAS	Tengku Hassan Tengku Omar	8,201	43.45	▼9.24
BN	Mohd Sabri Alwi	7,838	41.53	▼5.79
PKR	Zulkifli Mohamad	2,836	15.03	▲15.03
Total valid votes		18,875	100.00	
Total rejected ballots		179		
Unreturned ballots		92		
Turnout		19,146	84.83	▼1.76
Registered electors		22,570		
Majority		363	1.92	▼3.45
PAS hold		Swing		

Terengganu state election, 2013: Ladang
Party	Candidate	Votes	%	∆%
PAS	Tengku Hassan Tengku Omar	9,066	52.68	▲2.57
BN	Wan Ahmad Farid Wan Salleh	8,142	47.32	▼2.57
Total valid votes		17,208	100.00	
Total rejected ballots		165		
Unreturned ballots		22		
Turnout		17,395	86.59	▲4.92
Registered electors		20,089		
Majority		924	5.37	▲5.14
PAS hold		Swing		

Terengganu state election, 2008: Ladang
Party	Candidate	Votes	%	∆%
PAS	Tengku Hassan Tengku Omar	6,723	50.12	▲4.14
BN	Wan Hisham Wan Salleh	6,692	49.88	▼4.14
Total valid votes		13,415	100.00	
Total rejected ballots		285		
Unreturned ballots		1		
Turnout		13,701	81.67	▼2.48
Registered electors		16,777		
Majority		31	0.23	▼7.83
PAS gain from BN		Swing		-

Terengganu state election, 2004: Ladang
Party	Candidate	Votes	%	∆%
BN	Wan Hisham Wan Salleh	6,981	54.03	▲17.19
PAS	Sulaiman Abdullah	5,940	45.97	▼17.19
Total valid votes		12,921	100.00	
Total rejected ballots		159		
Unreturned ballots		110		
Turnout		13,190	84.14	▲8.08
Registered electors		15,676		
Majority		1,041	8.06	▼18.27
BN gain from PAS		Swing		-

Terengganu state election, 1999: Ladang
Party	Candidate	Votes	%	∆%
PAS	Sulaiman Abdullah	6,175	63.16	▲63.16
BN	Roslan Awang Chik	3,601	36.84	▼22.04
Total valid votes		9,776	100.00	
Total rejected ballots		194		
Unreturned ballots		124		
Turnout		10,094	76.07	▲1.34
Registered electors		13,270		
Majority		2,574	26.33	▲6.70
PAS gain from BN		Swing		-

Terengganu state election, 1995: Ladang
Party	Candidate	Votes	%	∆%
BN	Roslan Awang Chik	5,775	58.87	▼2.85
PAS	Zulkifli Chik	3,850	39.25	▲0.97
Independent	Harun @ Abd. Rahman Mohamad	184	1.88	▲1.88
Total valid votes		9,809	100.00	
Total rejected ballots		289		
Unreturned ballots		134		
Turnout		10,232	74.72	▲1.49
Registered electors		13,693		
Majority		1,925	19.62	▼3.82
BN hold		Swing		

Terengganu state election, 1990: Ladang
Party	Candidate	Votes	%	∆%
BN	Abu Bakar Daud	5,178	61.72	▼2.91
PAS	Salleh Ismail	3,211	38.28	▲38.28
Total valid votes		8,389	100.00	
Total rejected ballots		236		
Unreturned ballots		66		
Turnout		8,691	73.23	▲4.72
Registered electors		11,868		
Majority		1,967	23.45	▼5.82
BN hold		Swing		

Terengganu state election, 1986: Ladang
Party	Candidate	Votes	%	∆%
BN	Abu Bakar Daud	4,660	64.63	▼1.94
PAS	Ali Jusoh	2,550	35.37	▲4.27
Total valid votes		7,210	100.00	
Total rejected ballots		232		
Unreturned ballots		0		
Turnout		7,442	68.51	▼1.95
Registered electors		10,862		
Majority		2,110	29.26	▼6.22
BN hold		Swing		

Terengganu state election, 1982: Ladang
Party	Candidate	Votes	%	∆%
BN	Abu Bakar Daud	4,888	66.58	▲2.43
PAS	Abbas Alias	2,283	31.10	▲6.55
Parti Sosialis Rakyat Malaysia	Yasin Awang	171	2.33	▼8.99
Total valid votes		7,342	100.00	
Total rejected ballots		145		
Unreturned ballots		0		
Turnout		7,487	70.47	▲1.34
Registered electors		10,625		
Majority		2,605	35.48	▼4.12
BN hold		Swing		

Terengganu state election, 1978: Ladang
Party	Candidate	Votes	%	∆%
BN	Abu Bakar Daud	4,025	64.14	▼8.72
PAS	Mohamed Jusoh	1,540	24.54	▲24.54
Parti Sosialis Rakyat Malaysia	Mukhtar Abd. Rahman	710	11.31	▼15.83
Total valid votes		6,275	100.00	
Total rejected ballots		246		
Unreturned ballots		0		
Turnout		6,521	69.12	▲1.58
Registered electors		9,434		
Majority		2,485	39.60	▼6.12
BN hold		Swing		

Terengganu state election, 1974: Ladang
Party	Candidate	Votes	%	∆%
BN	Abu Bakar Daud	3,769	72.86	▲26.93
Parti Sosialis Rakyat Malaysia	Mohamed Ali Omar	1,404	27.14	▲27.14
Total valid votes		5,173	100.00	
Total rejected ballots		286		
Unreturned ballots		0		
Turnout		5,459	67.55	▼2.79
Registered electors		8,082		
Majority		2,365	45.72	▲37.57
BN gain from PAS		Swing		-

Terengganu state election, 1969: Ladang
Party	Candidate	Votes	%	∆%
PMIP	Wan Mohamed Wan Ngah	2,635	54.07	▲45.49
Alliance	Abdullah Abdul Rahman	2,238	45.93	▼3.09
Total valid votes		4,873	100.00	
Total rejected ballots		357		
Unreturned ballots		0		
Turnout		5,230	70.33	▼3.99
Registered electors		7,436		
Majority		397	8.15	▲1.53
PMIP gain from Alliance		Swing		-

Terengganu state election, 1964: Ladang
Party	Candidate	Votes	%	∆%
Alliance	Wan Daud Wan Ahmad	2,096	49.02	▲25.51
National Party	Garieb Abdul Raouf	1,813	42.40	▼0.84
PMIP	Mohamed Jusoh	367	8.58	▼19.40
Total valid votes		4,276	100.00	
Total rejected ballots		162		
Unreturned ballots		0		
Turnout		4,438	74.33	▲8.12
Registered electors		5,971		
Majority		283	6.62	▼8.65
Alliance gain from National Party		Swing		-

Terengganu state election, 1959: Ladang
Party	Candidate	Votes	%
National Party	Wan Daud Wan Ahmad	1,459	43.24
PMIP	Da Abdul Jalil Awang	944	27.98
Alliance	Sharifah Azzah Apple binti Syed Shith Alhabshee	793	23.50
Socialist Front	Syed Abdullah Ahmad	178	5.28
Total valid votes		3,374	100.00
Total rejected ballots		56	
Unreturned ballots		0	
Turnout		3,430	66.20
Registered electors		5,181	
Majority		515	15.26
This was a new seat created.
