= Hasnah Mohammed Hashim =

Chief Judge of Malaya from 2024 (born 1959)

Yang Amat Arif Tan Sri Dato' Sri Hasnah Mohammed Hashim PSM SSAP PMW JMN
- حسنة محمد هاشم

Chief Justice of Malaysia
- Acting
- In office 3 July 2025 – 28 July 2025
- Monarch: Ibrahim Iskandar
- Prime Minister: Anwar Ibrahim
- Preceded by: Tengku Maimun Tuan Mat
- Succeeded by: Wan Ahmad Farid Wan Salleh

13th Chief Judge of Malaya
- Incumbent
- Assumed office 12 November 2024
- Nominated by: Anwar Ibrahim
- Appointed by: Ibrahim Iskandar
- Monarch: Ibrahim Iskandar
- Prime Minister: Anwar Ibrahim
- Preceded by: Mohamad Zabidin Mohd Diah

Personal details
- Born: Hasnah binti Mohammed Hashim; 15 May 1959 (age 67) Kuantan, Pahang, Federation of Malaya (now Malaysia)
- Spouse: Mohd Idris Habib
- Children: 3
- Education: University of Malaya (LLB)
- Profession: Judicial and legal service

Hasnah binti Mohammed Hashim (born 15 May 1959) is a Malaysian judge and legal professional who has served as the 13th Chief Judge of Malaya since November 2024.

== Early life and education ==
Hasnah binti Mohammed Hashim was born on 15 May 1959 in Kuantan, Pahang. She pursued her early education in Pahang before enrolling at the University of Malaya, where she earned her Bachelor of Laws with Honours in 1983. She was later admitted to the Malaysian Bar in 2002.

== Career ==
Hasnah began her legal career in August 1983 as a legal officer in the Attorney General's Chambers. She later served as Senior Federal Counsel and legal adviser at several federal ministries, including the Ministry of Housing and Local Government, Ministry of Works, and the former Ministry of Telecommunications and Posts. She was also appointed as the Assistant State Legal Adviser in Selangor, becoming the first woman to hold that post.

In 1994, Hasnah was appointed as a judge of the Sessions Court, serving in Selangor and later in Kuala Lumpur. In 2000, she was made the Registrar of the Court of Appeal of Malaysia. She later served as Director of the Legal Profession Qualifying Board (2007–2009), and as Director General of the Department of Insolvency in 2009. From January 2009 to May 2010, she held the position of Chief Registrar of the Federal Court of Malaysia.

Hasnah was appointed as a Judicial Commissioner of the High Court of Malaya on 3 May 2010 and elevated to High Court Judge on 4 April 2012. She served in the Commercial Division of the High Court in Kuala Lumpur. In 2013, she was appointed President of the Competition Appeal Tribunal. She was later promoted to the Court of Appeal on 21 March 2016.

On 5 December 2019, Hasnah was elevated to the Federal Court of Malaysia. On 12 November 2024, she was appointed as the Chief Judge of Malaya, becoming the 13th person and the third female to hold the position.

== Notable case ==
On 1 July 2025, Hasnah chaired a three-judge panel of the Federal Court that heard and ruled on a preliminary objection filed by former Prime Minister Najib Razak against the Attorney General's appeal in the judicial review case concerning the Addendum Decree. In delivering the panel’s unanimous decision, Hasnah announced that the objection was dismissed. The panel found that the legal questions raised by the Attorney General, including those related to the power of pardon under Article 42 of the Federal Constitution, were new issues requiring further consideration by the court. The decision allows the substantive appeal to proceed in a scheduled two-day hearing.

== Notable contributions ==
Throughout her career, Hasnah has been involved in various aspects of judicial and legal service, including judicial administration, court management, and legal policy development. She was part of initiatives to modernise court operations and contributed to the implementation of digital systems in the judiciary beginning in 2019.

Her previous roles also included work in legislative drafting and involvement in privatisation processes during her tenure with several federal ministries. As of 2024, she serves as the Chair of the Judicial Training Committee under the Judicial Academy, overseeing programmes related to the continuing education and development of judicial officers.

== Personal life ==
Hasnah is married to Mohd Idris Habib. They have three daughters.

== Honours ==
- Malaysia :
  - Commander of the Order of Loyalty to the Crown of Malaysia (PSM) – Tan Sri (2025)
  - Companion of the Order of the Defender of the Realm (JMN) (2009)
- Federal Territory (Malaysia) :
  - Commander of the Order of the Territorial Crown (PMW) – Datuk (2010)
- Pahang :
  - Knight Grand Companion of the Order of Sultan Ahmad Shah of Pahang (SSAP) – Dato' Sri (2020)
