= Tengku Maimun Tuan Mat =

Chief Justice of Malaysia from 2019 to 2025

Yang Mulia Tun Tengku Maimun Tuan Mat SSM PMN SPSK DUPN DPSK
- تڠكو ميمون توان مت
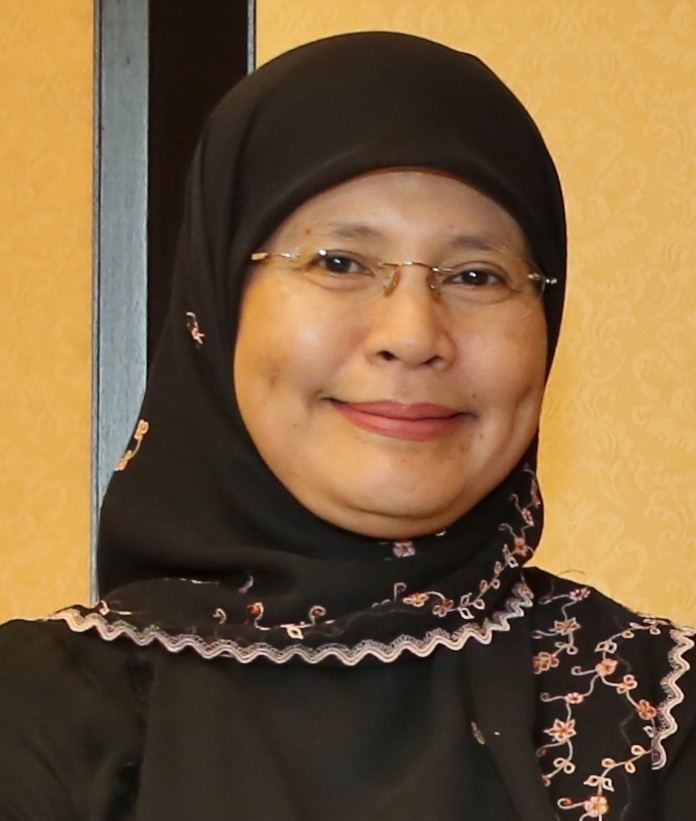
- Tengku Maimun in 2019

Chief Justice of Malaysia
- In office 2 May 2019 – 2 July 2025
- Nominated by: Mahathir Mohamad
- Appointed by: Abdullah
- Monarchs: Abdullah (2019–2024); Ibrahim Iskandar (2024–2025)
- Prime Minister: Mahathir Mohamad (2018–2020); Muhyiddin Yassin (2020–2021); Ismail Sabri Yaakob (2021–2022); Anwar Ibrahim (2022–2025)
- Preceded by: Richard Malanjum
- Succeeded by: Wan Ahmad Farid Wan Salleh

Personal details
- Born: 2 July 1959 (age 67) Kota Bharu, Kelantan, Federation of Malaya (now Malaysia)
- Spouse: Zamani Ibrahim
- Children: 4
- Education: University of Malaya (LLB)
- Occupation: Lawyer

Tengku Maimun binti Tuan Mat (Note: Jawi: تڠكو ميمون توان مت) (born 2 July 1959) is a Malaysian lawyer who served as the Chief Justice of Malaysia from 2019 until her retirement in 2025. She was the second-longest serving Chief Justice of Malaysia and the first woman to be appointed to the office.

During her tenure, Tengku Maimun presided over several landmark cases, most notably the conviction of former Prime Minister Najib Razak in the 1Malaysia Development Berhad scandal. Her leadership on the bench drew both praise and criticism, particularly for rulings on religious and constitutional issues. Demonstrating a strong sense of judicial independence, she was once described as "the only man in the Federal Court" after issuing minority judgments in four major constitutional cases.

== Early life and education ==
Tengku Maimun was born on 2 July 1959 in Kota Bharu, Kelantan. She began her education at Merbau English School before continuing her secondary studies at Kota Bharu Secondary School and Sultan Ismail College. She completed her sixth form education at Kolej Tunku Kurshiah. Tengku Maimun later pursued her tertiary education in law at the University of Malaya and graduated in 1982.

== Early legal career (1982–2012) ==
Tengku Maimun began her legal career in 1982 as a legal officer with the Southern Kelantan Development Board, before transferring to an equivalent position in the Seremban Municipal Council in Negeri Sembilan in 1984. She entered the judicial and legal service as an assistant parliamentary draftsman in the drafting division of the Attorney-General's Chambers in 1986.

She served in various legal and judicial departments over the years, acting as a magistrate in the Court of Port Dickson, federal counsel in the Kuala Terengganu Legal Aid Department, senior assistant registrar in the High Court of Seremban, and deputy registrar in the High Court of Kuala Lumpur. She also served as a special officer, first to the Chief Judge of Malaya and later to the Chief Justice of Malaya. Apart from her research activities, she was also deployed as a judge of the Sessions Court in Kuala Lumpur. She then served as a registrar in the High Court of Malaya and as chief registrar of the Federal Court of Malaysia. Between 2005 and 2006, she was deployed as chief registrar of the Federal Court of Malaysia.

Tengku Maimun was posted as a judicial commissioner of the High Court of Malaya at Kuala Lumpur on 2 October 2006, holding this position until 4 September 2007. She was later confirmed as a judge of the High Court of Malaya at Kuala Lumpur on 5 September 2007. She was also a judge of the High Court of Malaya at Shah Alam.

== Court of Appeal (2013–2018) ==
Tengku Maimun was appointed a judge of the Court of Appeal on 8 January 2013. She presided over several high-profile cases while in office. She was part of a three-judge bench in 2013 that, in a unanimous ruling, reversed the High Court's verdict convicting two former police commandos of the murder of Altantuya Shaariibuu, a decision that was subsequently upheld by the Federal Court.

In 2014, she was the sole dissenting voice in the case of M. Indira Gandhi, concerning the unilateral religious conversion of Gandhi's daughter to Islam by her ex-husband. She opposed the Court of Appeal's majority decision in the case, which reversed a High Court mandamus order directing the then Inspector-General of Police to locate and return Gandhi's daughter and arrest her ex-husband. The Federal Court later overturned the majority decision.

In 2016, Tengku Maimun was again the sole dissenter on a bench that upheld a sedition charge against Democratic Action Party chairman Karpal Singh. The conviction was later overturned unanimously by the Federal Court in 2019. In 2018, she headed a three-judge bench that upheld a High Court ruling that Tenaga Nasional's negligence in connection with 2013 Cameron Highlands mud floods. Tengku Maimun found sufficient evidence to establish the company's failure in damming the Ringlet and causing the disaster.

In 2019, she was part of a seven-member panel led by then-Chief Justice Richard Malanjum that overturned a stay of proceedings previously granted to former Prime Minister Najib Razak. This decision allowed Najib's SRC International corruption trial, which was linked to the 1Malaysia Development Berhad scandal, to move forward after multiple delays. She was later appointed a Federal Court judge on 26 November 2018.

== Chief Justice of Malaysia (2019–2025) ==
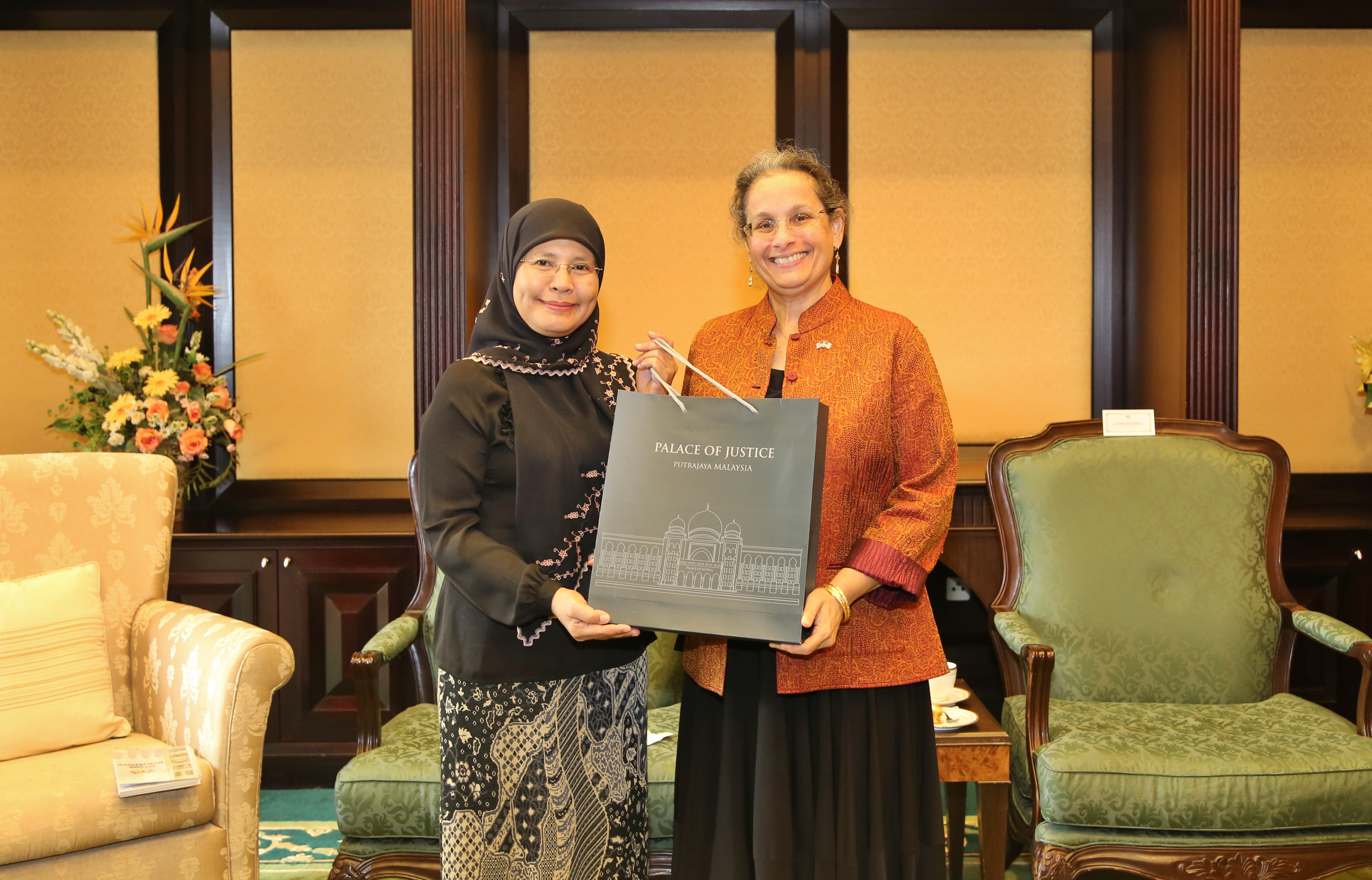
Tengku Maimun and Kamala Shirin Lakhdhir in 2019

After the compulsory retirement of Malanjum, in April 2019, Prime Minister Mahathir Mohamad received royal consent from Yang di‑Pertuan Agong Abdullah of Pahang to appoint Tengku Maimun as his successor; on 2 May 2019 she was sworn in as chief justice, becoming the first woman to hold Malaysia's highest judicial office, following consultation with the Conference of Rulers.

Tengku Maimun presided over several landmark cases during her tenure in the Federal Court. In 2021, she led a nine-judge Federal Court bench that unanimously struck down Section 28 of Selangor Shariah Criminal Offences Enactment 1995, (Note: Section 28 of the Selangor Syariah Criminal Offences Enactment 1995 criminalised same-sex relations under the offence of "unnatural sex," but was declared unconstitutional by the Federal Court in 2021 for exceeding state legislative powers and violating the Federal Constitution.) declaring it unconstitutional on the grounds that the state legislature lacked the authority to legislate on matters under federal jurisdiction, even if no federal law existed on the issue. In 2022, Tengku Maimun chaired two critical rulings in Najib's SRC case: first, dismissing his bid to introduce new evidence to overturn his conviction, and second, affirming his conviction and sentence in unanimous agreement with the court, resulting in Najib becoming the first former Malaysian prime minister to be jailed.

In 2023, Tengku Maimun was appointed an honorary bencher at the Honourable Society of the Middle Temple. That same year, she chaired a five-judge Federal Court panel that unanimously ruled Section 498 of the Penal Code unconstitutional. The provision, which punished men for enticing away married women, was found to violate Article 8 of the Federal Constitution as it discriminated on the basis of gender, allowing only husbands, not wives, to lodge such complaints. In 2024, she led an eight-to-one majority decision in Nik Elin v Kelantan, where the Federal Court declared that 17 provisions of the Syariah Criminal Code (I) Enactment 2019 passed by the Kelantan State Legislative Assembly were unconstitutional, as they encroached on areas reserved for federal legislation.

Among her final rulings as Chief Justice in 2025, Tengku Maimun chaired a five-member panel that unanimously struck down Section 9(5) of the Peaceful Assembly Act 2012 for violating Article 10(2)(b) of the Constitution, which guarantees the right to peaceful assembly. On the same day, she also chaired a Federal Court panel that upheld the convictions of three of the accused in the high-profile Anthony Kevin Morais murder case while acquitting three others. The death sentence of the case's mastermind, R. Kunaseegaran, was upheld following his decision to withdraw his appeal while the sentences of the other two convicts were commuted to 40 and 35 years of imprisonment, with one also receiving 12 strokes of whipping.

On 1 July 2025, Tengku Maimun marked her final day in court, expressing that she had "no regrets" after leading Malaysia's judiciary for six years and noting that not receiving a six-month extension was not an issue for her. She officially retired the following day, on 2 July 2025, her 66th birthday, the mandatory retirement age. On her final day in office, she described her time in service as a privilege and expressed hope that her successor would continue the work of maintaining public confidence in the judiciary. In July 2025, Prime Minister Anwar Ibrahim's administration chose not to extend Tengku Maimun's tenure, and Wan Ahmad Farid was appointed her successor.

== Personal life ==
Tengku Maimun is married to lawyer Zamani Ibrahim. Together they have four children.

Zamani became the center of public attention in 2022 when a 2018 Facebook post in which he posted his personal political opinions was discovered. The post was discovered while Najib's final appeal was being heard, causing Najib to accuse Zamani of being prejudiced and of influencing Tengku Maimun's decisions regarding the case. Malaysian authorities asserted that Zamani's update was personal opinion and did not constitute any offence. Najib asked for Tengku Maimun to recuse herself from the case, but Tengku Maimun declined his request.

== Honours ==
- Malaysia
  - Grand Commander of the Order of Loyalty to the Crown of Malaysia (SSM) – Tun (2020)
  - Commander of the Order of the Defender of the Realm (PMN) – Tan Sri (2019)
- Kelantan
  - Knight Grand Commander of the Order of the Loyalty to the Crown of Kelantan (SPSK) – Dato' (2016)
  - Knight Commander of the Order of the Loyalty to the Crown of Kelantan (DPSK) – Dato' (2006)
- Penang
  - Knight Commander of the Order of the Defender of State (DUPN) – Dato' Seri Utama (2019)

== Notes ==
Legal offices
Preceded by Richard Malanjum	10th Chief Justice of Malaysia; 2019–2025	Succeeded by Hasnah Hashim (acting)
