= Public Service Department (Malaysia) =

Public Service Department (PSD)
- Jabatan Perkhidmatan Awam (JPA)
- Coat of arms of Malaysia

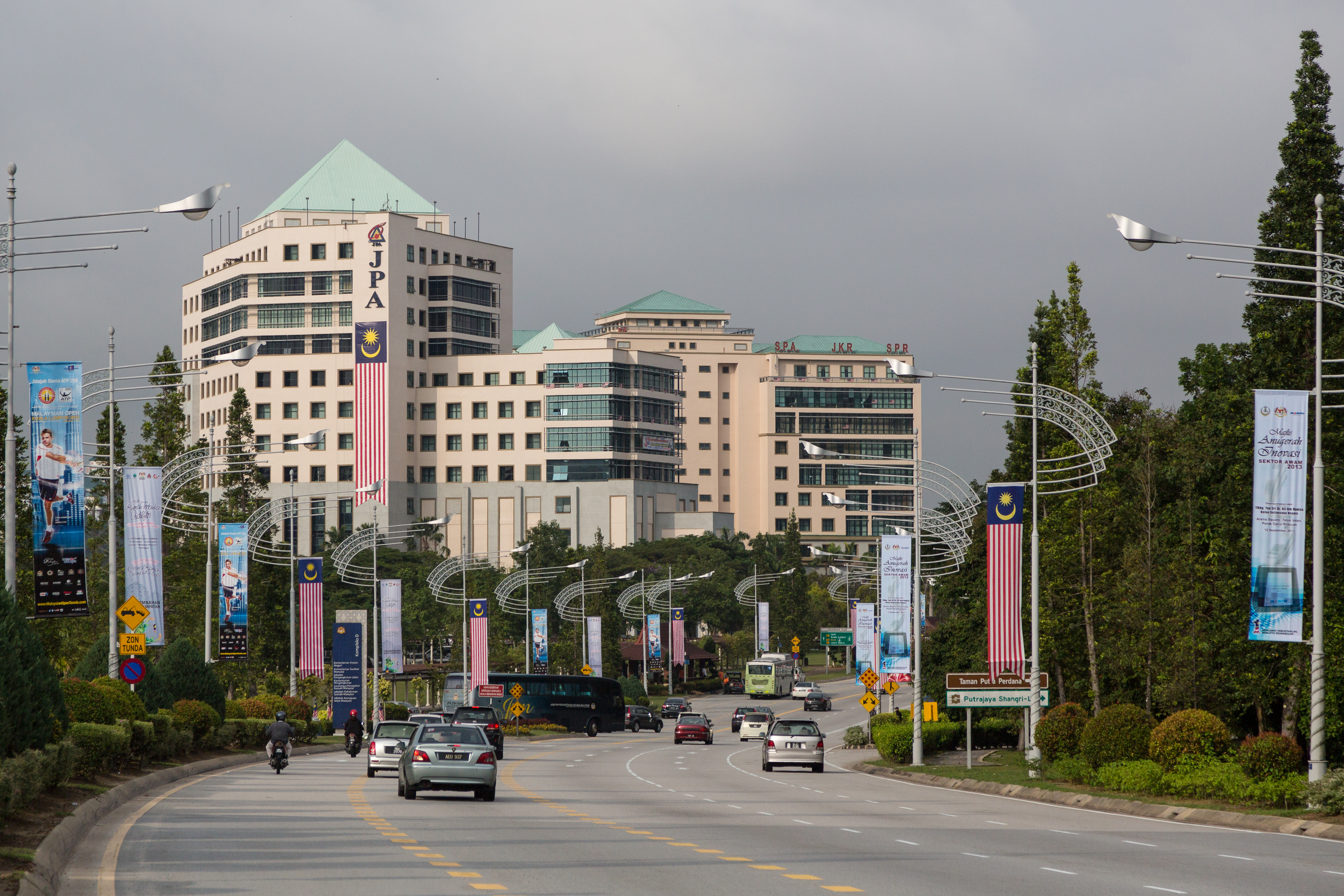
- Malaysian Public Service Department Building

Department overview
- Formed: 1934; 92 years ago
- Jurisdiction: Government of Malaysia
- Headquarters: Block C1-C3, Complex C, Federal Government Administrative Centre, 62510 Federal Territory of Putrajaya
- Motto: Driving Public Service Transformation (Peneraju Transformasi Perkhidmatan Awam)
- Employees: 4,866 (2017)
- Annual budget: MYR 1,623,931,100 (2020)
- Department executive: Wan Ahmad Dahlan Abdul Aziz, Director-General
- Key document: Federal Constitution of Malaysia
- Website: www.jpa.gov.my

The Public Service Department (Malay: Jabatan Perkhidmatan Awam), abbreviated JPA or PSD, is responsible for the public service in Malaysia.

== See also ==
- Director-General of Public Service (Malaysia)
