= Tan Sri Dr. Abdullah Sanusi Digital Library =

- Perpustakaan Digital Tan Sri Dr. Abdullah Sanusi
- Location: Open University Malaysia, Petaling Jaya, Malaysia

Collection
- Items collected: Printed books, e-books, e-journals, e-theses, newspapers, legal acts
- Size: Over 30,000 printed books, 82,000 e-books, 32,000 e-journal titles, 930,000 e-thesis titles

The Tan Sri Dr. Abdullah Sanusi Digital Library or TSDAS Digital Library is a digital library housed at Open University Malaysia, Petaling Jaya, Malaysia. Although it is known as digital library, the library holds a wide range of resources in both online and print format. Currently, there are close to 30,000 volumes of printed books in the library system. The library subscribes to 37 online databases comprising e-books, e-journals, e-theses and more. To date, there are more than 82,000 e-books and 32,000 e-journal titles, about 930,000 e-thesis titles, three newspaper databases and one local legal act database covering all courses offered in OUM.

== History ==
Opened as part of OUM, it was simply known as the Digital Library until 24 January 2004 when it was renamed Tan Sri Dr. Abdullah Sanusi Digital Library in memory of the university's founder the late Tan Sri Dr. Abdullah Sanusi Ahmad.
