= Christopher Wan Soo Kee =

Malaysian former police officer

Christopher Wan Soo Kee (born 1951) is a former Malaysian police officer. He served as director of the Bukit Aman Criminal Investigation Department from 2006 to 2008.

== Background ==
Christopher Wan Soo Kee was born on 1951 in Ayer Hitam, Penang.

== Police Career ==
Wan joined the Royal Malaysia Police on 11 November 1969 as a probationary inspector. He served in multiple departments, including as a Bukit Aman Special Branch staff officer from 1970 to 1997, assistant director of management (Administration) Bukit Aman from 1997 to 2000, and the head of the Kuala Lumpur Special Branch from 2000 to 2002.

Wan was appointed the Malacca Police Chief held from 1 July 2002 to 2005. Following that position, he was the Penang Police Chief from 1 February 2005 to 2006.

On 1 November 2006, Wan was appointed the director of the Bukit Aman Criminal Investigation Department. He was 55 years old at the time. During his tenure, Wan led the investigation into the murder of Nurin Jazlin. He retired on 9 January 2008 at the age of 57.

== Honours ==
- Malaysia:
  - Commander of the Order of Meritorious Service (PJN) – Datuk (2007)
  - Officer of the Order of the Defender of the Realm (KMN) (1998)
- Malacca:
  - Companion Class I of the Exalted Order of Malacca (DMSM) – Datuk (2002)
- Penang:
  - Companion of the Order of the Defender of State (DMPN) – Dato' (2006)
