= Sanusi =

Sanusi may refer to:

== Islamic Scholar ==
- Muhammad ibn Yusuf al-Sanusi (1426-1490), medieval Maghrebi Islamic scholar and polymath
- Ahmad Sanusi, contemporary Indonesian Islamic scholar

== Dynasty ==
- the Senusiyya, a Sufi order and Libyan dynasty, also spelled Sanusi
- Muhammad ibn Ali al-Sanusi (1787–1859), founder of the dynasty
- Ahmed Sharif as-Senussi (1873–1933), third head of the dynasty

== Family name ==
- Muhammadu Sanusi I, Emir of Kano from 1953 to 1963, grandfather of Sanusi Lamido Sanusi
- Sanusi Lamido Sanusi (born 1961), Governor of the Central Bank of Nigeria 2009–2014 and Emir of Kano 2014–2020
- Joseph Oladele Sanusi (born 1938), Governor of the Central Bank of Nigeria from 1999 to 2004
- Anthony Sanusi (1911–2009), Nigerian catholic bishop
- Ryan Sanusi (born 1992), Belgian footballer
- Abidemi Sanusi, contemporary Nigerian author
- Zaidu Sanusi, Nigerian footballer

== Given name ==
- Sanusi (cyclist) (born 1933), Indonesian Olympic cyclist
- Sanusi Pane (1905–1968), Indonesian writer, journalist, and historian
- Sanusi Mahmood (1909–1995), first Mufti of Singapore
- Sanusi Dantata (1919–1997), Nigerian businessman of Kano state
- Mohammed Sanusi Daggash (born 1960), Nigerian architect and politician, currently Minister of Works and Housin
- Sanusi Junid (1942–2018), 7th Menteri Besar of Kedah
- Abdullah Sanusi Ahmad (1936–2003), Malaysian public servant and academian
- Muhammad Sanusi Md Nor (born 1974), 14th Menteri Besar of Kedah
