= Director-General of Public Service (Malaysia) =

Director-General of Public Service

- Ketua Pengarah Perkhidmatan Awam
- Incumbent; Wan Ahmad Dahlan Abdul Aziz since 9 January 2024
- Public Service Department
- Style: Yang Berbahagia
- Abbreviation: KPPA
- Reports to: Prime Minister
- Seat: Putrajaya
- Appointer: Yang di-Pertuan Agong on the advice of Prime Minister
- Formation: 22 August 1934; 92 years ago
- First holder: Sir John Huggins

The Director-General of Public Service (Malay: Ketua Pengarah Perkhidmatan Awam) is the head of the Public Service Department in Malaysia. Wan Ahmad Dahlan Abdul Aziz has been the 27th Director-General since 9 January 2024.

== History ==
The post "Director General Of Public Service" in Malaysia dates back to 1934, the title used by the Head of Administrative Service was Malayan Establishment Officer, the inaugural holder was Sir John Huggins. Subsequently, when A.J. Gracie held the position in 1954, the title was changed to Federation Establishment Officer. After H.G. Turner replaced Gracie in 1957 until Tan Sri Ahmad Husin assumed the position of Head of Public Sector Service in 1960, the title used was Principal Establishment Officer (P.E.O).

The title was changed to Ketua Pegawai Perjawatan in 1962 and remained in use until 1967, which was when Tunku Mohamed Tunku Besar Burhanuddin led the public service. In 1967, Pejabat Perjawatan Persekutuan was renamed as Establishment Office of Malaysia. When Tan Sri Abdul Kadir Shamsuddin helmed the leadership, the title was changed to Pengarah Perjawatan Malaysia in 1968 at the same year the name Jabatan Perkhidmatan Awam (JPA) was first used on 15 August 1968. Later, it was changed to the title of Ketua Pengarah Perkhidmatan Awam (KPPA) as used in Service Circular No. 2 Year 1968 dated 7 October 1968.

== List of directors-general ==
Since 1934, PSD (and its original department) has been led by 27 Directors-General, as shown below:

No.	Portrait	Director-General of Public Service	Term of office		
No.	Portrait	Director-General of Public Service	Took office	Left office	Time in office
1.		Sir John Huggins	22 August 1934	1943	9 years
2.		A.J. Gracie	1 July 1954	7 September 1957	3 years, 68 days
3.		Harold Turner	8 September 1957	1 July 1959	1 year, 296 days
4.		Tan Sri; Ahmad Husin	5 October 1959	1 March 1963	3 years, 147 days
5.		Tan Sri; Tunku Mohamed Tunku Besar Burhanuddin	2 March 1963	6 November 1967	4 years, 249 days
6.		Tan Sri; Abdul Kadir Shamsuddin	7 November 1967	31 October 1969	1 year, 358 days
7.		Tan Sri; Syed Zahiruddin Syed Hassan	1 November 1969	29 June 1972	2 years, 241 days
8.		Tan Sri Datuk; Abdullah Ayub	1 July 1972	31 July 1974	2 years, 30 days
9.		Tan Sri Datuk; Abdullah Mohd Salleh	1 August 1974	30 September 1976	2 years, 60 days
10.		Tan Sri Datuk; Abdul Aziz Zakaria	1 October 1976	17 June 1978	1 year, 259 days
11.		Tan Sri; Hashim Aman	18 June 1978	30 November 1980	2 years, 165 days
12.		Tan Sri; Osman S. Cassim	1 December 1980	31 July 1985	4 years, 242 days
13.		Tan Sri; Rozhan Kuntom	1 August 1985	26 January 1987	1 year, 178 days
14.		Tan Sri Dato'; Alwi Jantan	26 January 1987	15 April 1990	3 years, 79 days
15.		Tan Sri Dato'; Mahmud Taib	16 April 1990	December 1995	5 years
16.		Tan Sri Dr. Mazlan Ahmad	14 December 1995	14 December 1998	3 years, 0 days
17.		Tan Sri Dato'; Samsudin Osman	15 December 1998	31 January 2001	3 years, 47 days
18.		Tan Sri; Jamaluddin Ahmad Damanhuri	2001	2005	4 years
19.		Tan Sri; Ismail Adam	2005	30 June 2010	5 years
20.		Tan Sri; Abu Bakar Abdullah	1 July 2010	1 July 2012	2 years, 0 days
21.		Tan Sri; Mohamad Zabidi Zainal	15 March 2013	31 December 2016	3 years, 292 days
22.		Tan Sri; Zainal Rahim Seman	16 January 2017	31 May 2018	1 year, 136 days
23.		Tan Sri; Borhan Dolah	13 July 2018	9 September 2019	1 year, 59 days
24.		Tan Sri; Mohd Khairul Adib Abd Rahman	1 October 2019	16 January 2022	2 years, 108 days
25.		Dato' Sri; Mohd Shafiq Abdullah	10 February 2022	12 December 2022	306 days
26.		Dato' Seri Dr. Zulkapli Mohamed (b.1965)	27 February 2023	8 January 2024	316 days
27.		Tan Sri; Wan Ahmad Dahlan Abdul Aziz (b.1966)	9 January 2024	Incumbent	2 years, 242 days
