= Zulkifli Abdullah =

Malaysian retired police officer)

Yang Berbahagia Dato' Sri Zulkifli Abdullah PJN SSAP SIMP DPSK DPTS PGPP JSM PSPP PPA PKN PJPN DCh
- ذوالكفلي عبدالله
- Zulkifli in 2020

12th Director-General of the National Anti-Drugs Agency
- In office 15 August 2018 – 25 December 2020
- Monarchs: Muhammad V (2018–2019); Abdullah (2019–2020)
- Prime Minister: Mahathir Mohamad (2018–2020); Muhyiddin Yassin (2020)
- Minister: Muhyiddin Yassin (2018–2020); Hamzah Zainudin (2020)
- Preceded by: Abd Halim Mohd Hussin
- Succeeded by: Sutekno Ahmad Belon

Personal details
- Born: 27 December 1960 (age 65) Johor Bahru, Johor, Federation of Malaya
- Spouse: Noraini Abdul Jalil (m. 1985)
- Children: 4
- Education: University College, Cardiff (B.Sc. (Hons), M.B.A.)
- Occupation: Police officer
- Police career
- Allegiance: Malaysia
- Department: Royal Malaysian Police
- Service years: 1984–2020
- Rank: Police Commissioner
- Badge no.: G/10330

Zulkifli bin Abdullah (Jawi: ذوالكفلي بن عبدالله; born 27 December 1960) is a Malaysian retired police officer who served as 12th Director-General of the National Anti-Drugs Agency from August 2018 to December 2020.

== Personal life ==
=== Educational background ===
Zulkifli was enrolled his first primary school at Sekolah Rendah Kebangsaan Tambatan, Johor Bahru and his secondary school at Sekolah Tuanku Abdul Rahman, Ipoh.

When passed the Malaysian Certificate of Education in 1977 with excellent grade, he was offered to continue his study to United Kingdom and get passed the A-level at Colchester Institute of Higher Education, Essex two years later.

After passed the A-level, he enrolled to University College, Cardiff in field of mathematics and he obtained his bachelor degree with honours in 1983. He also graduated master degree in business administration at the same college.

=== Family ===
Zulkifli was married Noraini binti Abdul Jalil in 1985 and had three sons and one daughter with her.

== Police career ==
=== Early police career ===
Zulkifi undergo basic training at RMP College Kuala Kubu Bharu and commissioned to Probationary Assistant Superintendent on 8 January 1984 and posted at Damansara Police Station.

Along his early career, he posted at multiple assignment, such as Deputy Chief of Pasir Mas District Police and Custodian of Major Crimes in the Criminal Investigation Department, Penang State Police Headquarters.

After he completed his master degree in United Kingdom and get rank promotion to Deputy Superintendent in 1992, he posted at the Commercial Crime Investigation Department, Royal Malaysia Police Headquarters and he transferred as Deputy Chief of Criminal Investigation Department III - Commercial Crime Investigation Department, Johor State Police Headquarters two years later and get rank promotion to Superintendent of Police, then he transferred to Deputy Chief of Criminal Investigation Department I at same department and get rank promotion to Assistant Commissioner several years later.

He appointed as Deputy Director III (Finance) of Logistic Department, Royal Malaysia Police Headquarters on 15 March 2004 and get rank promotion to Senior Assistant Commissioner II.

=== Get top post ===
In August 2005, Zulkifli appointed as Kelantan Police Chief and made him as the youngest state police chief at the time. Almost two years later, he transferred to Perak and be the State Police Chief there until he transferred again as Kuala Lumpur Police Chief in late 2010.

In May 2011, Zulkifli was appointed as Director of RMP Logistic Department and he transferred as Director of Management Department in August 2015. In July 2017, he appointed as Director of Internal Security and Public Order Department.

=== NADA Director-General ===
Zulkifli was appointed as Director-General of the National Anti-Drugs Agency in August 2018 following retirement his predecessor, Abd Halim Mohd Hussin. He held the post until 25 December 2020, two days before he retired.

== Honours ==
=== Honours of Malaysia ===
- Malaysia
  - Commander of the Order of Meritorious Service (PJN) – Datuk (2016)
  - Companion of the Order of Loyalty to the Crown of Malaysia (JSM) (2006)
  - Recipient of the General Service Medal (PPA)
  - Recipient of the National Sovereignty Medal (PKN)
  - Recipient of the 14th Yang di-Pertuan Agong Installation Medal
  - Recipient of the 15th Yang di-Pertuan Agong Installation Medal
- Royal Malaysia Police
  - Courageous Commander of the Most Gallant Police Order (PGPP) (2012)
  - Loyal Commander of the Most Gallant Police Order (PSPP) (2010)
  - Recipient of the National Hero Service Medal (PJPN)
- Kelantan
  - Knight Commander of the Order of Loyalty to the Crown of Kelantan (DPSK) – Dato' (2006)
  - Recipient of the Sultan Muhammad V Proclamation Medal
- Pahang
  - Knight Grand Companion of the Order of Sultan Ahmad Shah of Pahang (SSAP) – Dato' Sri (2015)
  - Knight Grand Companion of the Order of the Crown of Pahang (SIMP) – Dato' Indera (2013)
- Perak
  - Knight Commander of the Order of Taming Sari (DPTS) – Dato' Pahlawan (2008)
  - Recipient of the Sultan Azlan Shah Silver Jubilee Medal
  - Recipient of the Sultan Nazrin Shah Installation Medal

=== Foreign honours ===
- Thailand
  - Knight Grand Commander of the Order of the White Elephant (DCh) (2014)
