= Zulkapli Mohamed =

Malaysian civil servant

Yang Berbahagia Dato' Seri Zulkapli Mohamed SPMP DPPN PGDK DPMP PCM

26th Director-General of Public Service
- In office 27 February 2023 – 8 January 2024
- Monarch: Abdullah
- Prime Minister: Anwar Ibrahim
- Preceded by: Mohd Shafiq Abdullah
- Succeeded by: Wan Ahmad Dahlan Abdul Aziz

Personal details
- Born: 17 August 1965 (age 61) Perak, Federation of Malaysia
- Education: Universiti Sains Malaysia (Bachelor of Social Sciences (Honours)); University of Japan (Master's Degree in International Development); University of Meiji (Doctor of Philosophy (PhD) in Economics (International Finance))

Zulkapli bin Mohamed (born 1965) is a Malaysian civil servant who was the Director-General of Public Service from February 2023 to January 2024.

== Civil career ==
Zulkapli Mohamed began in public service with his first position as Assistant Secretary in the Training Division at the Public Service Department (JPA) on 1 December 1992. On 17 February 2014, he was General Manager of the Perak Foundation under of the Perak State Secretary Office.

On 12 October 2015, Mohamed was chief executive officer of the Solid Waste Management and Public Cleaning Corporation (SWCorp) under Ministry of Urban Wellbeing, Housing and Local Government. On 22 October 2018, Mohamed was Director of the Human Capital Development Division of Public Service Department.

On 21 February 2022, he was Deputy Director General of Public Service (Development). On 27 February 2023, he was promoted to the Director-General of Public Service, replaced Mohd Shafiq Abdullah. In January 2024, he was replaced by Wan Ahmad Dahlan Abdul Aziz.

== Honours ==
- Perak
  - Knight Grand Commander of the Order of the Perak State Crown (SPMP) – Dato' Seri (2023)
  - Knight Commander of the Order of the Perak State Crown (DPMP) – Dato' (2014)
  - Commander of the Order of Cura Si Manja Kini (PCM) (2012)
- Penang
  - Knight Commander of the Order of the Defender of State (DPPN) – Dato' Seri (2023)
- Sabah
  - Commander of the Order of Kinabalu (PGDK) – Datuk (2021)
