= Ahmad Terrirudin Mohd Salleh =

10th Attorney General of Malaysia

Yang Arif Tan Sri Datuk Ahmad Terrirudin Mohd Salleh PSM PJN DSPN DSDK SMP ASK BCK
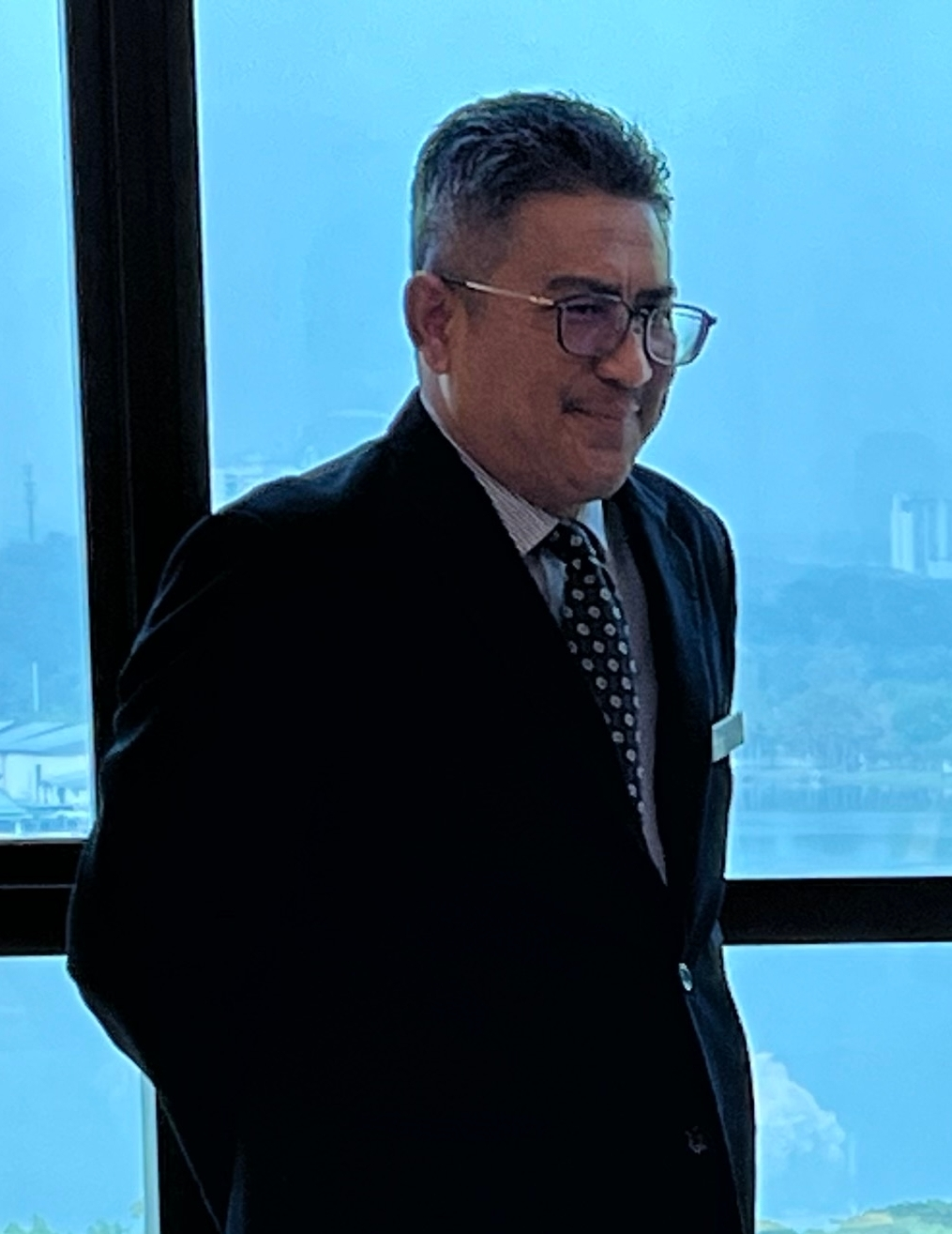
- Ahmad Terrirudin in 2023

Justice of the Federal Court of Malaysia
- Incumbent
- Assumed office 12 November 2024
- Monarchs: Ibrahim Iskandar (since 2024)
- Prime Minister: Anwar Ibrahim

Member of the Judicial Appointments Commission
- Incumbent
- Assumed office 15 November 2025
- Prime Minister: Anwar Ibrahim
- Preceded by: Zabariah Mohd Yusof

12th Attorney General of Malaysia
- In office 6 September 2023 – 11 November 2024
- Monarchs: Abdullah (2023–2024); Ibrahim Iskandar (since 2024)
- Prime Minister: Anwar Ibrahim
- Preceded by: Idrus Harun
- Succeeded by: Mohd Dusuki Mokhtar

Personal details
- Born: Ahmad Terrirudin bin Mohd Salleh; 12 April 1968 (age 58) Alor Setar, Kedah, Malaysia
- Citizenship: Malaysian
- Spouse: Zarina Idris
- Children: 4
- Education: University of Malaya (LLB)
- Occupation: Lawyer, civil servant

Ahmad Terrirudin bin Mohd Salleh (born 12 April 1968) is a Malaysian lawyer who has served as the Justice of the Federal Court of Malaysia since 12 November 2024. Prior to his appointment as a federal judge, he served as the 12th Attorney General of Malaysia from 6 September 2023 to 11 November 2024.

== Early life and education ==
Ahmad Terrirudin was born in Alor Setar, Kedah in 1968. He obtained a bachelor's degree in law from University of Malaya in 1992.

== Career ==
Ahmad Terrirudin began his career as a legal (judicial) officer at the Kuala Lumpur High Court. He has served as a special officer to Chief Justice Tun Ahmad Fairuz Sheikh Abdul Halim in 2003. In 2007, he was appointed as a Kuala Lumpur Sessions Court judge. He also once held the position as chairman of the Kuala Lumpur and Penang Industrial courts.

He was the Deputy Head of Civil Division III, Civil Division, Attorney General's Chamber in 2017 and has served as Kedah State Legal Adviser in 2019. He was previously the Chief Registrar of the Federal Court before being appointed as the Solicitor-General on 25 March 2022.

On 6 September 2023, he was appointed as the 12th Attorney General of Malaysia, which he would only served for 14 months until 11 November 2024. On the next day, 12 November 2024, he was appointed as a new Justice to the Federal Court of Malaysia. On 15 November 2025, he was appointed as a member of the Judicial Appointments Commission for a term of two years until 14 November 2027.

== Controversy ==
During his tenure as the Attorney General of Malaysia, Ahmad Terrirudin was also one of the members for the Federal Territories Pardons Board.

On 29 January 2024, the Pardons Board (which was chaired by the then-16th Yang di-Pertuan Agong Sultan Abdullah of Pahang) in a controversial move, decided to halved the prison sentence of Malaysia's former prime minister Najib Razak, who was convicted of criminal breach of trust, power abuse, and money laundering in the SRC International scandal. Najib Razak's prison sentence was reduced from 12 years to 6 years imprisonment, while his fine was reduced from RM210 million to RM50 million.

On 3 February 2024, Federal Territories Minister Dr Zaliha Mustafa, who also sits on the Pardons Board had claimed that the decision to halve Najib's prison sentence is a "collective decision" of the board.

On 5 February 2024, Ahmad Terrirudin was also urged to reveal his advice in the Pardons Board meeting to the public, but Terrirudin did not respond to such call.

=== Royal addendum ===
In March and April 2024, it is rumored there exists a "royal addendum" issued by the then Yang di-Pertuan Agong Sultan Abdullah to allow Najib to undergo house arrest for his remainder of his 6 years prison sentence. On 1 April 2024, Najib and his lawyer Shafee Abdullah filed an application for judicial review in the High Court, which they alleged the "royal addendum" was issued by the previous Yang di-Pertuan Agong on 29 January 2024 and allowed Najib to undergo house arrest instead of being imprisoned in the Kajang Prison for his remaining sentence. The said "royal addendum" was purportedly addressed to the then Attorney General of Malaysia, which is Ahmad Terrirudin.

On 3 July 2024, the Kuala Lumpur High Court rejected the application to initiate the judicial review as the judge found the supporting affidavits submitted by Najib were "purely hearsay". However, on 6 January 2025, the Court of Appeal granted permission for Najib to commence judicial review after his lawyer Shafee Abdullah revealed a letter from the Pahang palace confirming the existence of the "royal addendum". The Court of Appeal then reverted the case back to High Court.

After the Court of Appeal's decision, Ahmad Terrirudin was confronted by multiple journalists to seek for his comment over Najib Razak's house arrest "royal addendum" during the Opening of the Legal Year 2025 held at Putrajaya International Convention Centre on 8 January 2025. Terrirudin did not answer the journalists' questions and briefly responded "No, no, no..." before he walked past the journalists and exited the building.

On 21 May 2025, Najib through his lawyer Shafee filed for a leave application to initiate a conttempt proceeding against Ahmad Terrirudin, who they accused of concealing the existence of the "royal addendum" addressed to him. On 23 May, the Attorney General's Chamber responded by saying that Najib's move is a breach of existing court order, which has paused all proceedings related to the royal addendum case, pending its appeal to the Federal Court on 1 and 2 July 2025.

On 16 Jun 2025, Shafee under the instruction of Najib filed a police report against Ahmad Terrirudin, accusing him of "deliberately misleading" the High Court by saying the existence of the "royal addendum" is hearsay and speculative, which Shafee claimed is in contravention of Section 204 (destruction of document evidence) and Section 209 (making false claim before a Court) of the Penal Code.

== Honours ==
=== Honours of Malaysia ===
- Malaysia
  - Commander of the Order of Loyalty to the Crown of Malaysia (PSM) – Tan Sri (2024)
  - Commander of the Order of Meritorious Service (PJN) – Datuk (2021)
- Kedah
  - Knight Companion of the Order of Loyalty to the Royal House of Kedah (DSDK) – Dato' (2022)
  - Recipient of the State of Kedah Distinguished Service Star (BCK) (2006)
- Kelantan
  - Member of the Order of Loyalty to the Crown of Kelantan (ASK)
- Pahang
  - Companion of the Order of the Crown of Pahang (SMP) (2005)
- Penang
  - Officer of the Order of the Defender of State (DSPN) – Dato' (2021)
