= Harold Turner (colonial administrator) =

British colonial administrator (1906–1981)

Harold Turner CMG
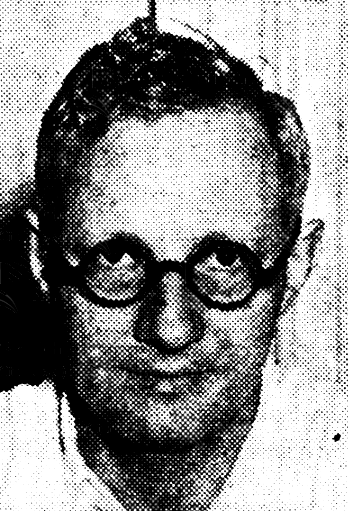
- Turner in 1950
- Born: 23 December 1906
- Died: 10 July 1981 (aged 74)
- Education: Trinity College, Cambridge
- Occupation: Colonial administrator
- Children: 2

Harold Goodhew Turner CMG (23 December 1906 – 10 July 1981) was a British civil servant and colonial administrator who was Defence Secretary in the Colony of Singapore from 1950 to 1952 and Secretary to the Treasury of the Federation of Malaya from 1959 to 1961.

== Early life and education ==
Turner was born on 23 December 1906, the son of George Prior Turner and Blanche Winifred Turner. He was educated at St Olave's Grammar School and Trinity College, Cambridge.

== Career ==
Turner joined the Malayan Civil Service as a cadet in 1929, and his first post was as a magistrate in Perak. In 1930, he was appointed assistant District Officer of Sitiawan, then Collector of Revenue for Penang and then magistrate and assistant District Officer of Ipoh. In 1931, he was transferred to Singapore where he assistant secretary to the Governor of the Straits Settlements, before he returned to Perak as assistant secretary to the Resident. In 1934, he was appointed assistant adviser in Kluang. In 1936, he served as State Agriculture Officer for Selangor. In 1938, he returned to Singapore as assistant secretary in the Colonial Secretary's Office.

During the Japanese occupation of Malaya, Turner was interned in Singapore. He was working in the secretariat up to the Fall of Singapore and in his memoirs he describes the capture of the city by the Japanese army in February 1942. Spending several days burning secret files and currency notes, he prepared a list of the staff at the secretariat which he sent to the British Embassy in Batavia with a request that next-of-kin be advised.

After the War, Turner returned to Malaya and, after the restoration of civilian rule in 1946, was appointed to the post of Deputy Resident Commissioner, Central, and Deputy Establishment Officer at Kuala Lumpur. In 1950, he was appointed Secretary for Defence and Internal Security of Singapore, and was responsible for formulating arrangements for the civil defence of the colony and the establishment of a civil defence corps. In 1952, he transferred to Kuala Lumpur and served as Principal Establishment Officer to the Federation of Malaya. In 1959, he was appointed Secretary to the Treasury of the Federation of Malaya, succeeding A. H. P. Humphrey, a post he held until his retirement in 1961.

Turner returned to England and joined the home civil service as Commonwealth Relations Officer at the Foreign Office remaining in the post from 1962 to 1968. In 1969, he was appointed Director of Studies at the Royal Institute of Public Administration, a post he held until 1973.

== Personal life and death ==
Turner married Aileen Mary Mace in 1934 and they had a son and a daughter.

Turner died on 10 July 1981, aged 74.

== Honours ==
Turner was appointed Companion of the Order of St Michael and St George (CMG) in the 1960 Birthday Honours.
