= Zainal Rahim Seman =

Malaysian civil servant

Yang Berbahagia Tan Sri Dato' Seri Zainal Rahim Seman PSM SPMP SSAP DUPN DGPN DPMK DMSM DMPN DSPN
- زين رحيم سيمن

22nd Director-General of Public Service
- In office 16 January 2017 – 31 May 2018
- Monarch: Muhammad V
- Preceded by: Mohamad Zabidi Zainal
- Succeeded by: Borhan Dolah

Personal details
- Born: Zainal Rahim bin Seman; 24 August 1957 (age 68) Perak, Federation of Malaya

Zainal Rahim bin Seman is a Malaysian civil servant who served as Director-General of Public Service from January 2017 to May 2018.

== Civil servant career ==
Zainal Rahim Seman serving in the public sector for 33 years since joining the Administrative and Diplomatic Officer (PTD) service on 9 January 1984. On 16 April 2009, Chief Secretary to the Government Mohd Sidek Hassan announced his appointment as the Secretary of Penang State Government. On 2012, he served as Secretary-General of the Ministry of Human Resources. On 13 January 2014, he served as Deputy Director General of Public Service (Operations). On 9 January 2015, he served as Director General of the Malaysian Administrative Modernisation and Management Planning Unit (MAMPU) in Prime Minister's Department.

He was appointed as 22nd Director-General of Public Service on 16 January 2017. He was retired on 31 May 2018.

== Post career ==
Zainal Rahim Seman has been appointed as the Chairman of the National Wage Negotiating Council (MPGN) for the period from 1 May 2024 to 30 Sept 2026. Zainal Rahim Seman was appointed Chairman of the National Farmers' Organization (NAFAS) Advisory Council on 8 November 2024.

== Honours ==
- Malaysia :
  - Commander of the Order of Loyalty to the Crown of Malaysia (PSM) – Tan Sri (2017)
- Kelantan :
  - Knight Commander of the Order of the Crown of Kelantan (DPMK) – Dato' (2016)
- Malacca :
  - Companion Class I of the Exalted Order of Malacca (DMSM) – Datuk (2006)
- Pahang :
  - Knight Grand Companion of the Order of Sultan Ahmad Shah of Pahang (SSAP) – Dato' Sri (2015)
- Penang :
  - Knight Grand Commander of the Order of the Defender of State (DUPN) – Dato' Seri Utama (2020)
  - Commander of the Order of the Defender of State (DGPN) – Dato' Seri (2011)
  - Companion of the Order of the Defender of State (DMPN) – Dato' (2009)
  - Officer of the Order of the Defender of State (DSPN) – Dato' (2007)
- Perak :
  - Knight Grand Commander of the Order of the Perak State Crown (SPMP) – Dato' Seri (2017)
