= Abdul Hamid Mohamad =

Malaysian lawyer (1942–2026)

Yang Amat Berbahagia Tun Abdul Hamid Mohamad SSM SPCM DUPN DPCM DMPN KMN PJK

5th Chief Justice of Malaysia
- In office 1 November 2007 – 18 October 2008
- Nominated by: Abdullah Ahmad Badawi
- Appointed by: Mizan Zainal Abidin
- Preceded by: Ahmad Fairuz Abdul Halim
- Succeeded by: Zaki Azmi

5th President of the Court of Appeal of Malaysia
- In office 5 September 2007 – 6 December 2007
- Nominated by: Abdullah Ahmad Badawi
- Appointed by: Mizan Zainal Abidin
- Preceded by: Abdul Malek Ahmad
- Succeeded by: Zaki Azmi

Personal details
- Born: Abdul Hamid bin Mohamad; 18 April 1942 Kepala Batas, Penang, Japanese-occupied Malaya (now Malaysia)
- Died: 19 February 2026 (aged 83) Cheras, Kuala Lumpur, Malaysia
- Resting place: Taman Selatan Muslim Cemetery, Precinct 20, Putrajaya, Malaysia
- Spouse: Hamidah Choong Abdullah
- Children: 4
- Education: University of Singapore
- Profession: Lawyer

Abdul Hamid bin Mohamad (18 April 1942 – 19 February 2026) was a Malaysian lawyer who served as the 5th Chief Justice of Malaysia from 1 November 2007 to 18 October 2008. He died on 19 February 2026, at the age of 83.

== Honours ==
=== Honours of Malaysia ===
- Malaysia
  - Grand Commander of the Order of Loyalty to the Crown of Malaysia (SSM) – Tun (2008)
  - Officer of the Order of the Defender of the Realm (KMN) (1978)
- Perak
  - Knight Grand Commander of the Order of Cura Si Manja Kini (SPCM) – Dato' Seri (2008)
  - Knight Commander of the Order of Cura Si Manja Kini (DPCM) – Dato' (1989)
- Perlis
  - Recipient of the Meritorious Service Medal (PJK) (1974)
- Penang
  - Knight Grand Commander of the Order of the Defender of State (DUPN) – Dato' Seri Utama (2008)
  - Companion of the Order of the Defender of State (DMPN) – Dato' (1996)

Legal offices
Preceded by Ahmad Fairuz Abdul Halim	Chief Justice of Malaysia; 2007–2008	Succeeded by Zaki Azmi
Preceded by Abdul Malek Ahmad	President of the Court of Appeal of Malaysia; 2007	Succeeded by Zaki Azmi
