= Order of the Defender of State =

Chivalric order of the Malaysian state of Penang

Order of the Defender of State Darjah Pangkuan Negeri

Awarded by the Yang di-Pertua Negeri of Penang
- Type: Chivalric order
- Founded: 1967
- Ribbon
- Status: Currently constituted
- Founder: Tun Dato' Seri Utama Raja Uda Raja Muhammad
- Grand Master: Tun Dato' Seri Utama Ramli Ngah Talib
- Grades: Knight Grand Commander; Knight Commander; Commander; Companion; Officer; Member
- Post-nominals: D.U.P.N.; D.P.P.N.; D.G.P.N.; D.M.P.N.; D.S.P.N.; D.J.N.

Precedence
- Next (higher): None (highest)
- Next (lower): Distinguished Service Star
- (Knight Grand Commander, old and new versions) (Knight Commander) (Commander) (Companion) (Officer) (Member); Ribbon bars

The Order of the Defender of State (Malay: Darjah Pangkuan Negeri) is the sole order of chivalry of the state of Penang which was constituted in 1967 by then Yang di-Pertua Negeri Tun Dato' Seri Utama Raja Uda Raja Muhammad to recognize eminent contributions of individuals towards Penang and the nation. The order was initially constituted in three grades, namely the Knight Grand Commander, Companion, and Member. Later, other grades were added to the order. Currently, the order is conferred in six grades.

Annually, inductions are made to the order on the occasion of the Yang di-Pertua Negeri's birthday.

== Grades ==
The Order of the Defender of State was initially constituted in three grades, namely Knight Grand Commander, Companion, and Member respectively. In 1976, the Officer grade was added, followed by, the Commander grade in 1996 and finally the Knight Commander in 2003.

=== Grand Principal ===
Darjah Utama Pangkuan Negeri (DUPN) – Dato' Seri Utama

The Grand Principal of the Order of the Defender of State (Malay: Darjah Utama Pangkuan Negeri) is the highest grade of the order which was constituted in 1967. The recipients of the grade bear the pre-nominal title of "Dato' Seri Utama", while the wives of the male recipients are titled as "Datin Seri". Husbands of female recipients are not entitled to any pre-nominal title. The recipients bear the post-nominal letters of "D.U.P.N."

The insignia of the grade comprises a collar, a sash, a badge and a star. The sash is a blue silk riband with wide white bars on both ends above which are two gold stripes. The sash is worn from the right shoulder to the left hip.

The grade is conferred on the Yang di-Pertua Negeri, the spouse of the Yang di-Pertua Negeri and upon eminent individuals for their services to Penang.

=== Grand Commander ===
Darjah Panglima Pangkuan Negeri (DPPN) – Dato' Seri

The Grand Commander of the Order of the Defender of State (Malay: Darjah Panglima Pangkuan Negeri) is the second highest grade of the order which was instituted in 2003. The recipients of the grade bear the title of "Dato' Seri", while the wives of the male recipients are titled as "Datin Seri". Husbands of female recipients are not entitled to any title. The recipients bear the post-nominal letters of "D.P.P.N."

The insignia of the grade comprises a collar, a sash, a badge and a star. The sash is a blue silk riband with wide gold bars on both ends and a wide white band in the center. The sash is worn from the right shoulder to the left hip.

=== Commander ===
Darjah Gemilang Pangkuan Negeri (DGPN) – Dato' Seri

The Commander of the Order of the Defender of State (Malay: Darjah Gemilang Pangkuan Negeri) is the third highest grade of the order which was instituted in 1996. The recipients of the grade bear the pre-nominal title of "Dato' Seri", while the wives of the male recipients are titled as "Datin Seri". Husbands of female recipients are not entitled to any pre-nominal title. The recipients bear the post-nominal letters of "D.G.P.N."

The insignia of the grade comprises a collar, a sash, a badge and a star. The sash is a blue silk riband with wide white bars on both ends and a wide gold band in the center. The sash is worn from the right shoulder to the left hip.

=== Companion ===
Darjah Yang Mulia Pangkuan Negeri (DMPN) – Dato'

The Companion of the Order of the Defender of State (Malay: Darjah Yang Mulia Pangkuan Negeri) is the fourth grade of the order which was instituted in 1967. The recipients of the grade bear the pre-nominal title of "Dato'", while the wives of the male recipients are titled as "Datin". Husbands of female recipients are not entitled to any pre-nominal title. The recipients bear the post-nominal letters of "D.M.P.N."

The insignia of the grade comprises a sash, a badge and a star. The sash is a blue silk riband with wide white bars on both ends and a wide gold band in the center. The sash is worn from the right shoulder to the left hip.

=== Lieutenant ===
Darjah Setia Pangkuan Negeri (DSPN) – Dato'

The Lieutenant of the Order of the Defender of State (Malay: Darjah Setia Pangkuan Negeri) is the fifth grade of the order which was instituted in 1976. The recipients of the grade bear the pre-nominal title of "Dato'", while the wives of the male recipients are titled as "Datin". Husbands of female recipients are not entitled to any pre-nominal title. The recipients bear the post-nominal letters of "D.S.P.N."

The insignia of the grade comprises a sash, a badge and a star. The sash is a blue silk riband with wide gold bars on both ends above which are two white stripes. The sash is worn from the right shoulder to the left hip.

=== Member ===
Darjah Johan Negeri (DJN)

The Member of the Order of the Defender of State (Malay: Darjah Johan Negeri) is the lowest grade of the order which was instituted in 1967. The recipients of the grade do not bear any pre-nominal title. The recipients bear the post-nominal letters of "D.J.N."

The insignia of the grade comprises a necklet. The star of the order in silver hanged to a riband which is made of blue silk with wide gold bars on both ends above which are two white stripes, similar to the sash of the Officer grade. The necklet is worn by the recipients around the neck.

== Grand Masters ==
The incumbent Yang di-Pertua Negeri is the Grand Master of the order and receives the highest class of the order, the Knight Grand Commander class or Darjah Utama Pangkuan Negeri (D.U.P.N.) and is titled as Dato' Seri Utama. All inductions, revocations and amendments are done at the pleasure of the Yang di-Pertua Negeri on the advice of the Chief Minister and the government. On several occasions, the spouse of the Yang di-Pertua Negeri also receives the same grade of the order as the Yang di-Pertua Negeri. The current Grand Master is Tun Dato' Seri Utama Ramli Ngah Talib since 1 May 2025.

- 1 August 1967 – 30 August 1967: Raja Uda, Yang di-Pertua Negeri I
- 31 August 1967 – 31 January 1969: Syed Sheh Shahabudin, Yang di-Pertua Negeri II
- 1 February 1969 – 1 February 1975: Syed Sheh Barakbah, Yang di-Pertua Negeri III
- 2 February 1975 – 30 April 1981: Sardon Jubir, Yang di-Pertua Negeri IV
- 1 May 1981 – 30 April 1989: Awang Hassan, Yang di-Pertua Negeri V
- 1 May 1989 – 30 April 2001: Hamdan Sheikh Tahir, Yang di-Pertua Negeri VI
- 1 May 2001 – 30 April 2021: Abdul Rahman Abbas, Yang di-Pertua Negeri VII
- 1 May 2021 – 30 April 2025: Ahmad Fuzi Abdul Razak, Yang di-Pertua Negeri VIII
- 1 May 2025 – present: Ramli Ngah Talib, Yang di-Pertua Negeri IX

== Recipients ==
=== Knight Grand Commander (D.U.P.N.) ===
- 1975: Abdul Razak Hussein
- 1977: Hussein Onn
- 1979: Wong Pow Nee
- 1980: Mohamad Adnan Robert
- 1981: Mahathir Mohamad
- 1989: Lim Chong Eu
- 1990: Ahmad Zaidi Adruce
- 1994: Anwar Ibrahim
- 1994: Siti Zainab Baharuddin
- 2003: Siti Hasmah Mohamad Ali
- 2004: Abdullah Ahmad Badawi
- 2007: Majimor binti Shariff
- 2008: Abdul Hamid Mohamad
- 2009: ~~Najib Razak~~ (revoked on 13 September 2022)
- 2012: Arifin Zakaria
- 2013: Pandikar Amin Mulia
- 2014: Ali Hamsa
- 2017: Mohamed Raus Sharif
- 2019: Tengku Maimun Tuan Mat
- 2020: Karpal Singh (posthumously)
- 2020: Zainal Rahim Seman
- 2021: Mohd Ali Rustam
- 2021: Khadijah Mohd Nor
- 2022: Juhar Mahiruddin
- 2024: Lim Kit Siang
- 2025: Raja Noora Ashikin Raja Abdullah
- Unknown: Abang Muhammad Salahuddin

=== Knight Commander (D.P.P.N.) ===
- 2004: Haidar Mohamed Nor
- 2004: Samsudin Osman
- 2004: Syed Hamid Albar
- 2005: Abdul Taib Mahmud
- 2006: Abdul Malek Ahmad
- 2008: Wan Azizah Wan Ismail
- 2011: Ismail Omar
- 2011: Zulkifeli Mohd Zin
- 2012: Kelvin Kiew Kwong Sen
- 2012: Lee Kim Yew
- 2012: Tan Kok Ping
- 2013: Hng Bok San
- 2013: Md. Salleh Yaapar
- 2013: Mohamad Zabidi Zainal
- 2013: Robert Tan Chung Meng
- 2014: Raja Mohamed Affandi
- 2015: Ambrin Buang
- 2015: Khoo Keat Siew
- 2015: Roslan Saad
- 2015: Teh Choon Beng
- 2015: Teh Aik Lum
- 2015: Yahaya Ibrahim
- 2016: Ismail Muhammad
- 2017: Choot Ewe Seng
- 2017: Zulkiple Kassim
- 2018: Tan King Tai
- 2018: Zulkifli Zainal Abidin
- 2019: Abdul Hamid Bador
- 2019: Affendi Buang
- 2020: Ackbal Abdul Samad
- 2020: Acryl Sani Abdullah Sani
- 2020: Mohd Reza Mohd Sany
- 2020: Suppiah a/l Manikam
- 2020: Zamrose Mohd Zain
- 2021: Mohaiyani Shamsudin
- 2021: Syed Hussian Syed Junid
- 2022: Mohamed Hassan Md Kamil
- 2022: Wong Siew Hai
- 2022: Yusuf Taiyoob
- 2023: Zulkapli Mohamed
- 2023: Tun Abd Majid Tun Hamzah
- 2023: Baharin Din
- 2025: Tengku Zafrul Aziz
- 2025: Shamsul Azri Abu Bakar
- 2025: Mohd Yussof Latiff
- 2025: Farhash Wafa Salvador Rizal Mubarak

=== Commander (D.G.P.N.) ===
- 1996: Ali Abul Hassan Sulaiman
- 1997: Abdullah Ahmad Badawi
- 1997: Lim Keng Yaik
- 1999: Mohd Shariff Omar
- 2001: Azizan Zainul Abidin
- 2001: Law Hieng Ding
- 2002: Abdullah Ahmad
- 2002: Kerk Choo Ting
- 2002: Shahrizat Abdul Jalil
- 2003: Nor Mohamed Yakcop
- 2004: Hilmi Yahaya
- 2007: Zulhasnan Rafique
- 2007: Kalimullah Masheerul Hassan
- 2008: Ahmad Said Hamdan
- 2009: Zahrain Mohamed Hashim
- 2009: Syamsul Arifin (honorary)
- 2010: Azizan Ariffin
- 2012: Zulkifli Zainal Abidin
- 2013: Abdul Aziz Jaafar
- 2015: Noor Rashid Ibrahim
- 2016: Cheah Cheng Hye (honorary)
- 2017: A. Samad Said
- 2017: Ramlan Ibrahim
- 2018: Maimunah Mohd Sharif
- 2018: Zulkifli Mohamad Al-Bakri
- 2020: Mazlan Lazim
- 2020: Sundarajoo Somu
- 2020: Anwar Fazal
- 2021: Sebastian Francis
- 2021: Tan Gin Soon
- 2022: Ahmad Fadil Shamsuddin
- 2022: Ahmad Jailani Muhamed Yunus
- 2022: Awang Adek Hussin
- 2022: Bey Leang Seng
- 2022: Bhupinder Singh Jeswant Singh
- 2022: Chan Kong Yew
- 2022: Gobalakrishnan Narayanasamy
- 2022: Haminnuddin Abd Hamid
- 2022: Jaseni Maidinsa
- 2022: Kamal Nasharuddin Mustapha
- 2022: Kulasegaran Sabaratnam
- 2022: Kuvenaraju Pachappen
- 2022: Lim Huat Bee
- 2022: Lim Kok Khong
- 2022: Lim Tiong Chin
- 2022: Mohamad Zulkefly Sulaiman
- 2022: Palaniappan Krishnan
- 2022: Rozali Mohamud
- 2022: Tan Choo Hin
- 2022: Tan Kean Tet
- 2022: Tan King Seng
- 2023: Abdul Halim Hussain
- 2023: Abdul Rahman Mohamad
- 2023: Abdul Wahab Mat Yasin
- 2023: Ahmad Zakiyuddin Abdul Rahman
- 2023: Cheah Seong Paik
- 2023: Chong Eng
- 2023: Chuah Hean Teik
- 2023: Jerry Chan Fook Sing
- 2023: Joseph Kow Hock Beng
- 2023: Khor Chong Hai
- 2023: Kumaraendran Kumarasamy
- 2023: Lee Chin Heng
- 2023: Lee Teong Li
- 2023: Lim Yam Koi
- 2023: Md Hamzah Md Kassim
- 2023: Mohd Sayuthi Bakar
- 2023: Mohd Shuhaily Mohd Zain
- 2023: Noor Azuan Abu Osman
- 2023: Ong Poh Eng
- 2023: Phee Boon Poh
- 2023: Reezal Merican Naina Merican
- 2023: Selvakumar Shanmugam Chetty
- 2023: Syed Mohamad Syed Murtaza
- 2023: Tan Eng Kee
- 2023: Teow Peng Hee
- 2023: Vaseehar Hassan Abdul Razack
- 2023: Yong Yoon Kooi
- 2024: Yee Thiam Sun

=== Companion (D.M.P.N.) ===
- Eusoffe Abdoolcader
- Musa Mohamad
- 1981: Abdullah Ahmad Badawi
- 1984: Mohd Zaman Khan
- 1985: Chin Fung Kee
- 1985: Elyas Omar
- 1987: Mohamed Dzaiddin Abdullah
- 1991: Anwar Ibrahim
- 1992: Abdul Rahman Arshad
- 1994: Yahya Awang
- 1994: Mohd Shariff Omar
- 1994: Salleh Mat Som
- 1996: Abdul Hamid Mohamad
- 1996: Hilmi Yahaya
- 1997: P. G. Lim
- 2000: Mohamed Raus Sharif
- 2000: Chang Yung-fa
- 2002: Ahmad Fuzi Abdul Razak
- 2003: Dzulkifli Abdul Razak
- 2003: Ken Yeang
- 2004: Tan Kee Kwong
- 2006: Christopher Wan Soo Kee
- 2007: Yusuf Taiyoob
- 2008: Raja Mohamed Affandi
- 2009: Abdul Halim Hussain
- 2009: Ayub Yaakob
- 2010: Mansor Othman
- 2012: Syed Danial Syed Ahmad
- 2012: Yee Thiam Sun
- 2013: Ahmad Hasbullah Mohd Nawawi
- 2013: Law Choo Kiang
- 2013: Mohd Rashid Hasnon
- 2013: Noor Hisham Abdullah
- 2013: Tan Gin Soon
- 2016: Sundarajoo Somu
- 2017: Abdul Malik Abul Kassim
- 2018: Ahmad Zakiyuddin Abdul Rahman
- 2018: Law Heng Kiang
- 2018: Lim Hock Seng
- 2022: Ang Cho Teing
- 2022: Annual Hassan
- 2022: Benjamin KRK Samy @ R. Antory
- 2022: Cheong Yew Teik
- 2022: Choong Chee Meng
- 2022: Fouad Hayel Saeed Anam
- 2022: Datuk Khoo Kay Hock
- 2022: Datuk Dr Kuldip Singh K. Sohan Singh
- 2022: Mohamad Anil Shah Abdullah
- 2022: Mohd Hussain Abdullah
- 2022: Supramaniam Kasia Pillai
- 2022: Taizoon Hyder Tyebkhan
- 2022: Tan Heng Kheng @ Tan Ah Poh
- 2022: Tan Hiang Joo
- 2022: Aileen Tan Shau Hwai
- 2022: Teh Yong Khoon
- 2022: Yeoh Moh Chai
- 2022: Zaiviji Ismail Abdullah
- 2023: Baldev Singh Gurcharn Singh
- 2023: Brian Tan Guan Hooi
- 2023: Che Omar Ahmat @ Ahmad
- 2023: Ganapathy Arumugam
- 2023: Khoo Kay Huat
- 2023: Mohamed Azam Mohamed Adil
- 2023: Mohd Salleh Man
- 2023: Ooi Kok Wan
- 2023: Pang Yun Tiam
- 2023: Parthiban Sanderasaggram
- 2023: Roslinda Mohd Shafie
- 2023: Zabidah Safar
- 2023: Saberabibi Abdul Rahim G. Shaik
- 2023: Steven Cheong Chuan Kwee
- 2023: Shanmugam A. T. Thiagarajah
- 2024: Mohamad Abdul Hamid

=== Officer (D.S.P.N.) ===
- 1988: Choong Ewe Leong
- 1996: Eddy Choong Ewe Beng
- 1998: Chuah Thean Teng
- 1998: Syed Danial Syed Ahmad
- 2001: Kalimullah Masheerul Hassan
- 2002: Mohamed Khaled Nordin
- 2003: Tan Gin Soon
- 2004: Jimmy Choo Yeang Keat
- 2004: Yee Thiam Sun
- 2005: Chuah Hean Teik
- 2008: Lee Chong Wei
- 2008: Nicol David
- 2011: Sundarajoo Somu
- 2012: Pua Khein-Seng
- 2015: Ahmad Zakiyuddin Abdul Rahman
- 2015: Mohammed Bakar
- 2016: Sebastian Francis
- 2014: Maimunah Mohd Sharif
- 2018: Salahuddin Ayub
- 2018: Marzuki Yahya
- 2018: Zulhelmy Ithnain
- 2020: Amar Pritpal Abdullah
- 2021: Ahmad Terrirudin Mohd Salleh
- 2021: Anas Alam Faizli
- 2022: Mohamad Abdul Hamid
- 2023: Azrul Mahathir Aziz
- 2023: Jason Ong Khan Lee
- 2023: Norlela Ariffin
- 2023: P'ng Lai Heng
- 2023: Soon Lip Chee
- 2023: Yeoh Soon Hin
- 2024: Rashidi Zinol
- 2024: Chang Kah Loon

== See also ==
- Orders, decorations, and medals of the Malaysian states and federal territories#Penang
- List of post-nominal letters (Penang)
