= Arifin Zakaria =

Malaysian judge and lawyer

Yang Amat Berbahagia Dato' Lela Negara Tun Dato' Arifin Zakaria SSM SPMK SPSK SPDK SPMS SPCM SPMP SSAP PSM DUPN DPCM DSMT DPMT DPMK
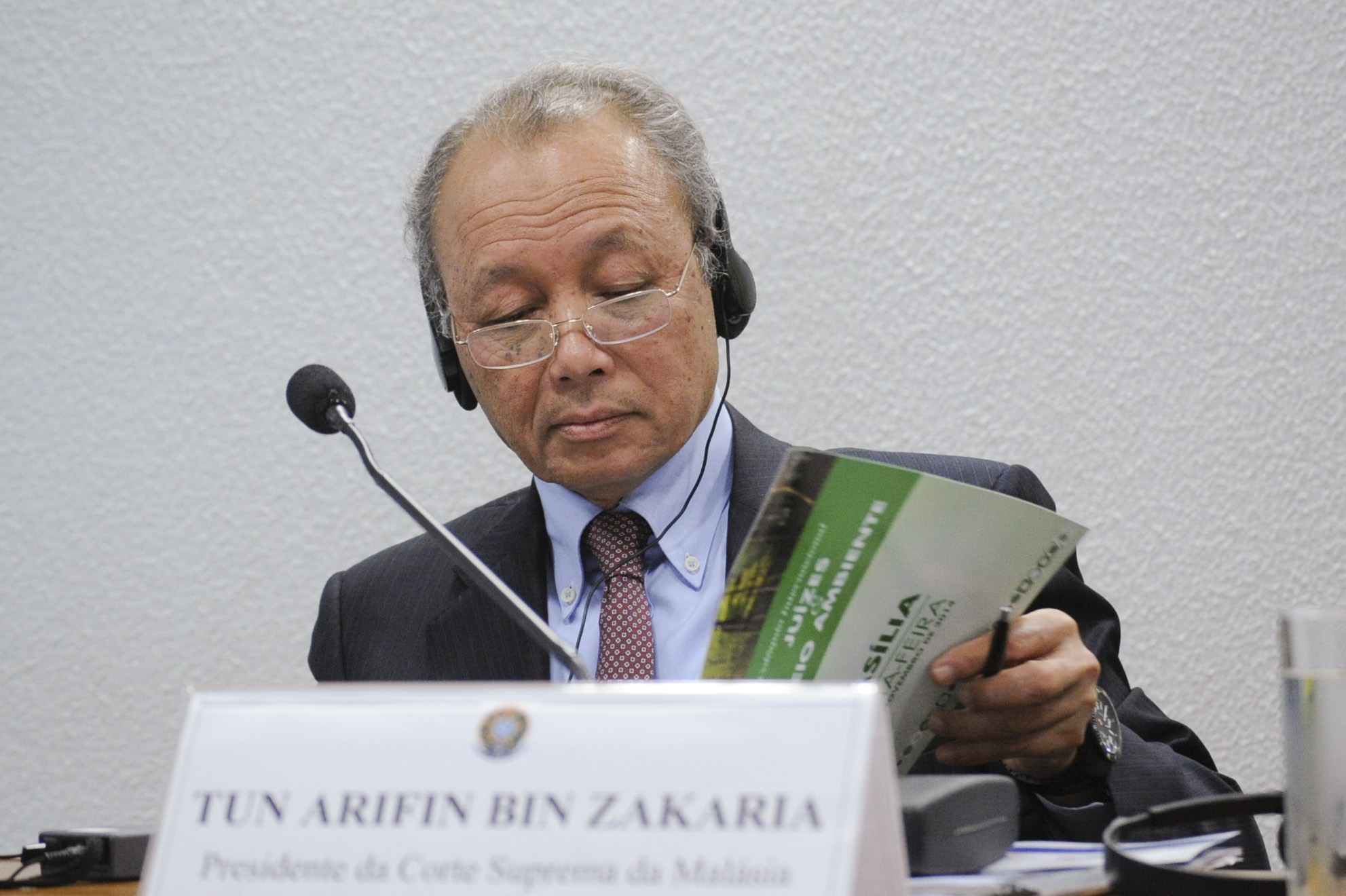

7th Chief Justice of Malaysia
- In office 12 September 2011 – 31 March 2017
- Nominated by: Najib Razak
- Appointed by: Mizan Zainal Abidin
- Preceded by: Zaki Azmi
- Succeeded by: Mohamed Raus Sharif

8th Chief Judge of Malaya
- In office 18 October 2008 – 11 September 2011
- Nominated by: Abdullah Ahmad Badawi
- Appointed by: Mizan Zainal Abidin
- Preceded by: Alauddin Mohd Sheriff
- Succeeded by: Zulkefli Ahmad Makinuddin

Group Chairman of Permodalan Nasional Berhad
- In office 6 May 2021 – 31 May 2023
- Preceded by: Zeti Akhtar Aziz
- Succeeded by: Raja Arshad Raja Uda

Personal details
- Born: Arifin bin Zakaria; 1 October 1950 (age 75) Pasir Mas, Kelantan, Federation of Malaya (now Malaysia)
- Spouse: Robiah Abdul Kadir
- Education: University of Sheffield; University College London

Arifin bin Zakaria (born 1 October 1950) is a Malaysian lawyer who served as the seventh Chief Justice of Malaysia, serving from 12 September 2011, succeeding Zaki Azmi, until 31 March 2017.

== Education background ==
After completing his secondary education at Sultan Ismail College, Kota Bahru, he went to read law at the University of Sheffield. Upon graduation, he joined the Malaysian Judicial and Legal Service in September 1974. In 1979, he pursued the Master of Laws (LL.M.) degree at University College London (UCL) and the Bar Final Course at the Council of Legal Education. In June 1980, he was called to the English Bar, and in the same year he received his LL.M. from University College London.

== Career ==
Prior to his elevation to the High Court Bench of Malaysia, he had served in various capacities in the Government of Malaysia both in the Judicial Office, as well as in the Legal Department. Among the positions held by him were Magistrate, President of the Sessions Court, Senior Assistant Registrar of the High Court, Federal Counsel and Senior Federal Counsel, Legal Advisor to Ministry of Primary Industries, Legal Advisor to the Public Services Department, Legal Advisor to Malacca and Perak, Deputy Parliamentary Draftsman and Senior Federal Counsel of the Inland Revenue Department.

On 1 March 1992, he was appointed Judicial Commissioner of the High Court of Malaya and two years after, he was appointed a High Court Judge of Malaya.

In 2002, he was elevated to the Court of Appeal of Malaysia. In 2005, he was elevated to the Federal Court of Malaysia. He was appointed to the present post of the Chief Judge of the High Court of Malaya effective 18 October 2008. His elevation as the Chief Justice of Malaysia was on 12 September 2011.

During his judicial service, he also had served many positions like the Judge of the Special Court, the Member of the Legal and Judicial Service Commission, the Committee Member of the Higher Court Method and the Lower Court Method, the Panel Member of the Sharia Appeal Court of Kelantan and the Member of the Qualification Board.

== Honours ==
=== Honours of Malaysia ===
- Malaysia
  - Commander of the Order of Loyalty to the Crown of Malaysia (PSM) – Tan Sri (2009)
  - Grand Commander of the Order of Loyalty to the Crown of Malaysia (SSM) – Tun (2012)
- Kelantan
  - Knight Grand Commander of the Order of the Crown of Kelantan (SPMK) – Dato' (2014)
  - Knight Grand Commander of the Order of the Loyalty to the Crown of Kelantan (SPSK) – Dato' (2005)
  - Knight Commander of the Order of the Crown of Kelantan (DPMK) – Dato' (1999)
  - Dato' Special Title of Kelantan State – Dato' Lela Negara (2010)
- Pahang
  - Knight Grand Companion of the Order of Sultan Ahmad Shah of Pahang (SSAP) – Dato' Sri (2008)
- Penang
  - Knight Grand Commander of the Order of the Defender of State (DUPN) – Dato' Seri Utama (2012)
- Perak
  - Knight Grand Commander of the Order of Cura Si Manja Kini (SPCM) – Dato' Seri (2012)
  - Knight Grand Commander of the Order of the Perak State Crown (SPMP) – Dato' Seri (2010)
  - Knight Commander of the Order of Cura Si Manja Kini (DPCM) – Dato' (1988)
- Sabah
  - Grand Commander of the Order of Kinabalu (SPDK) – Datuk Seri Panglima (2015)
- Selangor
  - Knight Grand Commander of the Order of the Crown of Selangor (SPMS) – Dato' Seri (2012)
- Terengganu
  - Knight Commander of the Order of the Crown of Terengganu (DPMT) – Dato' (1986)
  - Knight Companion of the Order of Sultan Mahmud I of Terengganu (DSMT) – Dato' (1995)

== Family ==
He is married to Toh Puan Robiah Abdul Kadir and has three sons and two daughters.

Legal offices
Preceded by Zaki Azmi	Chief Justice of Malaysia; 2011–2017	Succeeded by Mohamed Raus Sharif
Preceded by Alauddin Mohd Sheriff	Chief Judge of Malaya; 2008–2011	Succeeded by Zulkefli Ahmad Makinuddin
