= Mazlan Ismail =

Malaysian politician

Yang Berbahagia Datuk Mazlan Ismail مزلن بن اسماعيل PMW DPSK
- Born: Kubang Ulu, Permatang Pauh, Penang, Malaysia
- Education: Diploma in Electronic Communications, Bachelor in Operational Telecommunication, PhD in Influence of Intellectual Capital on the Performance of Telekom Malaysia
- Alma mater: University of Salford; University of Coventry; Malaysia University of Technology
- Occupations: MCMC Chief Operating Officer, Engineer (2018)
- Years active: 1986–2020
- Known for: Vice-President of National Network Operations for Telekom Malaysia, MCMC Chief Operating Officer
- Political party: Malaysian Islamic Party (PAS) (since 2024)
- Other political affiliations: Perikatan Nasional (PN) (since 2024)
- Spouse: Fadhilah Abdullah

Mazlan bin Ismail was the Chief Operating Officer for Malaysian Communications and Multimedia Commission (MCMC). He retired as Vice President of Telekom Malaysia (TM) and entered Malaysian politics, first as an appointed advisor to the Ministry of Communications and Multimedia Malaysia with specialised duties. He is best known for running in the 13th general election in Malaysia in Permatang Pauh, a parliament in the state of Penang. He lost to PKR leader Anwar Ibrahim with a majority of 11,721 votes, though he brought his party nearly 10,000 more votes than it had gotten in the previous election held in 2008, an increase of 64%. He currently advises and guides the Malaysians Communications and Multimedia Commission in the planning and implementation of the government's Digital Nation Development.

== Background ==
Mazlan Ismail was born in Kubang Ulu, Penanti, Bukit Mertajam (within the parliamentary constituent he contested) to Puan binti Hamid and Allahyarham Ismail bin Daud (better known as Pak Mail bas). Born in a poor family of whom both parents worked as rubber-tapers, while the father also drives school buses too in the morning, he was set to change the family's fate. He is known to the locals as Abang Lan Telekom, due to his occupation as a government servant while working in Jabatan Telekom (later privatised into Telekom Malaysia). Upon completion of his primary school locally, he continued his study in a boarding school, Sekolah Menengah Kebangsaan Sultan Abdul Halim in Jitra, Kedah (back then known as JENAN and now as SMSAH). Later, Mazlan went to University Technology Malaysia (UTM) in 1978 -1981 to study Diploma in Electronic Communications and furthered his first degree in University of Salford, United Kingdom in 1981 -1983. Mazlan then worked with Telekom Malaysia before being sponsored to further his study in master's degree in 1996, again in the United Kingdom in the University of Coventry specialising in Operational Telecommunication. In 2005 he received his doctorate degree (PhD) from the Business and Advance Technology Centre of University Technology Malaysia Kuala Lumpur. Further training includes training in Strategic Planning and Implementation of Telecommunication in Bell South Telecom, Florida, United States (1990), Training Innovation & Leadership in Motorola University, Schaumrbeg, United States (1995), Leadership Training in Madinah Institute of Leadership and Entrepreneurship, Madinah, Saudi Arabia (2012) and others.

== Tenure in Telekom Malaysia ==
Mazlan worked for 30 years as an engineer in Telekom Malaysia, holding various posts, from Assistant Manager in Butterworth, Penang to General Manager for Northern Region of Malaysia, and settled into senior management post as Vice President of National Network Operation (VP NNO), in-charge for technical network operation (transmission, data, switching & access networks) throughout Malaysia. The job scope was to be in-charge of around 320 executives, 7000 TM members and 5000 TM contractor members. He was also being appointed as a senior management TM's Group Leadership Team members chaired by TM's CEO.

Mazlan was appointed as Commanding Officer, ranked Lt Colonel of Rejimen Semboyan Pakar Diraja Telekom. Pakar Semboyan or Askar Wataniah Pakar Telekom with 700 Telekom Malaysia's staff reserves is responsible for the telecommunication service operation during times such as in DARURAT or declaration of emergency in Malaysia.

== Amplifying the Voice of the Disability Community in Manifesto Campaign ==
One of the most notable issues raised and became a manifesto of Mazlan during the general election was the pledge to support the underserved, particularly the disability community in Malaysia.

Motivated by his own eldest child, who has been blind since birth and is an OKU (Orang Kelainan Upaya), Mazlan is determined to bring the disability community's voice into parliament if elected. A notable moment in the campaign was when his child prayed in public for Mazlan's victory in the election. Mazlan was quoted saying that having personal experience in raising a child with a disability has given him empathy and insight into the feelings and challenges faced by parents in similar situations. He promised to adopt three existing rehabilitative centres in the constituency, located in Kampung Pertama, Seberang Jaya, and Kampung Tanah Liat.

== Social contribution ==
In the aftermath of the Malaysia's 13th General Election where Mazlan lost to the incumbent Anwar Ibrahim, established a religious study centre for the local community.

== Election results ==
Parliament of Malaysia
Year	Constituency	Candidate	Votes	Pct	Opponent(s)	Votes	Pct	Ballots cast	Majority	Turnout
2013	P044 Permatang Pauh	Mazlan Ismail (UMNO)	25,369	40.06%	Anwar Ibrahim (PKR)	37,090	58.56%	63,332	11,721	88.33%
2013	P044 Permatang Pauh	Mazlan Ismail (UMNO)	25,369	40.06%	Abdullah Zawawi Samsudin (IND)	201	0.32%	63,332	11,721	88.33%

== Honours ==
- Kelantan
  - Knight Commander of the Order of Loyalty to the Crown of Kelantan (DPSK) – Dato' (2017)
- Federal Territory (Malaysia)
  - Commander of the Order of the Territorial Crown (PMW) – Datuk (2018)
