= Anas Alam Faizli =

Malaysian business executive (born 1980)

Yang Berbahagia Dato' Dr. Anas Alam Faizli DSPN
- Born: 5 December 1980 (age 45); Sheffield, England
- Education: Universiti Teknologi Malaysia; Open University Malaysia
- Occupation: President | CEO/MD | Board of Director.
- Notable work: Rich Malaysia, Poor Malaysians

Anas Alam Faizli, known as Anas, is one of the most prominent leaders in the COVID-19 vaccination program in Malaysia, a Malaysian healthcare and pharmaceutical business leader, a construction and oil and gas professional, and an author. He also co-founded several non-governmental organisations and an economic research think tank. His book, Rich Malaysia, Poor Malaysians (Malaysia Kaya, Rakyat Miskin), is a bestseller in Malaysia.

== Family background ==
Anas was born on 5 December 1980 in Sheffield, England as the first child of ten siblings. He was raised in a family of moderate Muslims. Both his parents are lecturers at the Universiti Teknologi Malaysia (UTM). Anas' mother is from Kedah and his father is from Kuala Lumpur. Anas' maternal grandfather, Abdul Rahman bin Ibrahim was a headmaster of a government school in Simpang Empat, Alor Setar Kedah.

Anas' paternal grandfather, Mohd Zain bin Abu is of Bugis descent while his paternal grandmother, Siti Hajar binti Othman is of Minangkabau descent. Siti Hajar's father, Haji Othman bin Haji Abdullah, is a nationalist and a freedom fighter, founder of Seruan Azhar of Egypt and also the Malaya newspaper, Majlis. Haji Othman was a close friend of Indonesia's First Vice President, Mohammad Hatta.

Haji Othman's grandfather, Haji Mohd Taib bin Haji Abdul Samad, is regarded as an influential tycoon in the early history of Kuala Lumpur. As one of Malaysia's wealthiest merchants in the late 19th century, Haji Taib owned tin mines, plantation land and large numbers of houses and shops mostly in Malay Street (Jalan Melayu), Kuala Lumpur.

== Education ==
Anas receives his preliminary education from Sekolah Rendah Islam Al-Amin (SRIAA) in Jalan Gurney, Kuala Lumpur. He did his lower secondary school in Sekolah Menengah Islam Al-Amin (SMIAA).

He enrolled at Sultan Alam Shah Islamic College (Malay: Kolej Islam Sultan Alam Shah – KISAS) where he became a president of the International Club. He represented the school as part of the debating team for the Piala Perdana Menteri (PPM) in 1997, eventually winning third place at national level.

After KISAS, Anas pursued his bachelor's degree from the University of Technology Malaysia. In 2011, he received a Master of Project Management with distinction from the Open University Malaysia. In 2015, he received a Doctor of Business Administration from the same university. Anas gave a valedictorian speech at OUM's 17th Convocation.

== Career ==
Anas did his internship with IBM for six months in 2000. He joined the oil and gas industry with Sime Sembcorp Engineering and left as assistant project manager in 2004. Anas then spent 15 months with Petronas Carigali Sdn Bhd as a senior project controller. After that, Anas served Talisman Malaysia Limited for 10 years in various project management and developmental oil and gas roles in engineering, construction, hookup and commissioning, offshore and installation.

In the ten years, he served two years working onshore Vietnam and two years offshore at the Vietnam-Malaysia border and other assignments. As he is a certified Oil and Gas expert, the media would occasionally get his quote for business related issues on oil and gas. After the crude oil price falls in 2014, he joined as director of a Malaysian Multi-National Company (MNC), a leading international heavy steel construction company in 2015. In 2017, he joined Edgenta PROPEL Berhad (a subsidiary of UEM Edgenta Berhad) as the operations head for the maintenance of the ~1,000 km North–South Expressway and led its public sector & industry engagement activities.

He also serves as the Honorary Secretary of the Malaysian Oil and Gas Services Council (MOGSC) in 2016 - 2017. Then, he was the Treasurer for Malaysian Asset and Project Management Association (MAPMA) between 2019 - 2021.

In 2020, he joined ProtectHealth Corporation Sdn Bhd as its Chief Executive Officer and became involved with the COVID-19 vaccination program in Malaysia in 2021 and 2022. The vaccination program is also largest public-private partnership program in Malaysia. He later joined Duopharma Biotech Berhad pharmaceutical company as the Chief Executive Officer, Corporate in October 2022. He is also appointed as the Board of National Advisory on the UN Global Compact Network Malaysia & Brunei (UNGCMYB) in 2022. In 2024, he is appointed as a member of Scientific Advisory Board of IRDI, International Medical University. He joined OCI Terrasus as President & CEO in 2024 to 2025, a billion dollar Korean company based in Bintulu, Sarawak. In 2025 he was appointed as Director of Yayasan Canselor Open University Malaysia (YCOUM), and also as an Independent Director of NexG Berhad. In 2026, he joined Royce Pharma Manufacturing Sdn Bhd as President and Managing Director leading turnaround of the company.

== Rich Malaysia, Poor Malaysians ==
Anas is an occasional contributor for The Edge, The Star, Astro Awani and online portals. In 2014, Gerakbudaya published his best-selling book, entitled Rich Malaysia, Poor Malaysians: Essays on Energy, Economy and Education. A Malay version of the book, Malaysia Kaya, Rakyat Miskin was also published the same year. Both versions were launched in April 2014 by Tengku Razaleigh Hamzah, Malaysia's former finance minister and also the founding chairman and CEO of Petronas. The views and ideas presented in the book are considered useful for the formulation of policies by political parties and the government.

On Energy, the book touches on how Petronas plays it roles in its significant contribution to the country. It also explains the history, the regulations and mechanism used and the secret behind Petronas' success.

On economy, the book introduces the Malaysia's inequality dilemma, the myth of the rich and poor, high income nation versus low income citizen, the Malaysia's hollow economy conundrum and addresses issue on the foreign workers, education and healthcare. It also explains the concept of free trade, its pros and cons.

On education, the book advocates revisiting the national education philosophy, the introduction of the Love Pedagogy, promoting reading and critical thinking culture, the introduction of philosophy. It also touches on volunteerism and how the third party can become an agent of democracy.

The book was a bestseller for more than six months at Kinokuniya and Borders. On 11 May 2017, Tun Arshad Ayub, former deputy of Malaysia's Bank Negara launched the new and expanded edition of the book. The content was updated with 13 additional chapters covering issues that are currently plaguing Malaysia such as healthcare, foreign workers, environment, the hollow economy, green technology, woman empowerment and others.

In 2023, the book won Popular-The Star Readers’ Choice Awards (RCA)' number two award in the non-fiction category at the Bookfest@Malaysia 2023 which was held at the Kuala Lumpur Convention Centre.

== Think Tank and Non-governmental organisations ==
Anas is a co-founder of BLINDSPOT, a socio-economic think tank, a group of concerned citizens voicing out the voice of the voiceless – presenting critical, informative data and facts often missed. Anas was formerly a Founding chief executive officer on the board of Teach for The Needs (TFTN), a non-profit education-based civil society organisation which houses 1,000 volunteers, 300 university students and adopts 12 orphanages.

== Recognition ==
Anas is not a celebrity but is considered an influencer in Malaysia. In 2013, Astro Awani named Anas as Top Ten social media influencers. That same year, The Malaysian Insider named Anas through Teach for the Needs (TFTN) as Malaysia's Inspiring People 2013.

Anas has been giving public talks and joining forums on various topics as a non-political industry professional.

In 2020, Marketing in Asia (MIA) named Anas 100 Most Inspirational Linkedin icons in Malaysia you should follow in 2020.

In 2021, KSI Strategic Institute for Asia Pacific (KSI) awarded Anas with Asia Pacific Outstanding Business Leader Lifetime Achievement Award and ProtectHealth an Outstanding COVID-19 Vaccination Delivery of the Year by GlobalHealth Asia Pacific Awards 2021.

In 2022, ProtectHealth was given two awards at the Healthcare Asia Awards 2022: Public-Private Healthcare Partnership of the Year (Malaysia), and the Vaccination Delivery of the Year (Malaysia). That same year, the Malaysia Book of Records (MBoR) recognised ProtectHealth together with the Ministry of Health (MoH) as setting a new Malaysian record in "most vaccination doses administered in a day".

In 2023, KSI Strategic Institute for Asia Pacific (KSI) awarded Anas with the Malaysian Healthcare Icon Award recognising his contribution and credibility in the healthcare/ pharmaceutical industry.

== Honours ==
Anas was bestowed with the following honours:

=== Honours of Malaysia ===
- Penang
  - Officer of the Order of the Defender of State (DSPN) – Dato' (2021)
