= Mohd Shafiq Abdullah =

Malaysian civil servant

Yang Berbahagia Dato' Sri Mohd Shafiq Abdullah SSAP DPMS DIMP DSM KSD

25th Director-General of Public Service
- In office 10 February 2022 – 12 December 2022
- Prime Minister: Ismail Sabri Yaakob; Anwar Ibrahim
- Preceded by: Mohd Khairul Adib Abd Rahman
- Succeeded by: Zulkapli Mohamed

Personal details
- Education: National University of Malaysia (Bachelor of Political Science (Honours)); Meiji University (Master of Public Administration)
- Occupation: Public servant

Mohd Shafiq bin Abdullah is a Malaysian public servant who served as Director-General of Public Service from February 2022 to his termination in December 2022.

== Education ==
Mohd Shafiq Abdullah holds Bachelor of Political Science (Honours) from National University of Malaysia (UKM) and Master of Public Administration from Meiji University.

== Civil career ==
Mohd Shafiq Abdullah joined civil service on 1 December 1992 as Assistant Secretary in the Ceremonial Division of the Prime Minister's Department. On 16 February 2015, he served as Deputy Secretary-General (Development) of the Ministry of Works, previously he served as Divisional Secretary of Development and Privatisation Division of the Ministry of Works. On 26 August 2015, he served as Deputy Secretary-General (Finance) of the Ministry of Health. On 17 June 2019, he served as Deputy Secretary-General (Management) of the Ministry of Health. On 10 February 2021, he served as Secretary-General of the Ministry of Health. On 10 February 2022, he was appointed as Director-General of Public Service.

On 12 December 2022, he was terminated as Director-General of Public Service due to public interest. He later stated that will consider take legal action for his termination as Director-General of Public Service.

== Honours ==
- Malaysia
  - Officer of the Order of Loyalty to the Royal Family of Malaysia (KSD) (1997)
- Malacca
  - Member of the Exalted Order of Malacca (DSM) (2000)
- Pahang
  - Knight Grand Companion of the Order of Sultan Ahmad Shah of Pahang (SSAP) – Dato' Sri (2021)
  - Knight Companion of the Order of the Crown of Pahang (DIMP) – Dato' (2003)
- Selangor
  - Knight Commander of the Order of the Crown of Selangor (DPMS) – Dato' (2021)
