= Amar Singh Ishar Singh =

Malaysian police officer

Yang Berbahagia Dato' Sri Amar Singh SSAP DPSK DIMP PMW PGPP JMN JSM PSPP KMN PPA PJPN
- ਅਮਰ ਸਿੰਘ

Kuala Lumpur Police Chief
- In office 14 March 2016 – 5 December 2018

Personal details
- Born: Amar Singh a/l Ishar Singh; 6 June 1958 (age 68) Kinta District, Perak, Federation of Malaya (now Malaysia)
- Education: International Islamic University Malaysia
- Police career
- Country: Malaysia
- Department: Royal Malaysian Police
- Service years: 1983–2018
- Rank: Commissioner of Police
- Awards: The Most Gallant Police Order; General Service Medal
- Occupation: Police officer

Amar Singh s/o Ishar Singh (Punjabi: ਅਮਰ ਸਿੰਘ ਈਸ਼ਰ ਸਿੰਘ, romanized: Amar Siṅgh īśar Siṅgh; born 6 June 1958) is a Malaysian police officer serving in the Royal Malaysian Police (PDRM). He is the Director of Commercial Criminal Investigation Department (CCID) and has held the post of Kuala Lumpur Police Chief from 14 March 2016 to 5 December 2018.

== Early life ==
Amar holds an LLB from Buckingham University, and Amar also holds a Bachelor of Science and Master in Criminal Justice from the University of Malaya (UM); and Diploma in Shariah Law and Practice from the International International Islamic University Malaysia (IIUM). Amar started his career at the Ipoh district police headquarters after completing the Assistant Superintendent Cadet police policy training in 1983. He later received ranks and held different positions in the police force. Amar Singh was also the first Indian senior police officer to be appointed Commander of The Malaysian Police Training Centre (PULAPOL), Kuala Lumpur Police Chief and Director of Commercial Criminal Investigation Departement. Raised in a family involved in the field of policing, father Amar, Ishar Singh, joined the Federated Malay States Police in 1939, a year after coming to Malaya from Punjab. According to an English -language news portal, Ishar is a pioneer member of the special police squad team. Datuk Amar, Bachan Singh, was a constable in the early 1900s. On 25 May 2018, his contract as KL Police Chief was extended. He ended his career as a police officer on 5 December 2018 after three decades of service with the PDRM.

== Honours ==
- Malaysia
  - Companion of the Order of the Defender of the Realm (JMN) (2017)
  - Companion of the Order of Loyalty to the Crown of Malaysia (JSM) (2008)
  - Officer of the Order of the Defender of the Realm (KMN) (2007)
  - Recipient of the General Service Medal (PPA)
  - Recipient of the 15th Yang di-Pertuan Agong Installation Medal
- Royal Malaysia Police
  - Courageous Commander of the Most Gallant Police Order (PGPP) (2017)
  - Loyal Commander of the Most Gallant Police Order (PSPP)
  - Recipient of the National Hero Service Medal (PJPN)
  - Recipient of the Presentation of Police Colours Medal
- Federal Territory (Malaysia)
  - Commander of the Order of the Territorial Crown (PMW) – Datuk (2018)
- Kelantan
  - Knight Commander of the Order of Loyalty to the Crown of Kelantan (DPSK) – Dato' (2009)
- Pahang
  - Grand Knight of the Order of Sultan Ahmad Shah of Pahang (SSAP) – Dato' Sri (2017)
  - Knight Companion of the Order of the Crown of Pahang (DIMP) – Dato' (2007)
