= Murder of Ang May Hong =

1987 unsolved rape-murder of a schoolgirl in Malaysia

Ang May Hong
- Ang May Hong, pictured before her death
- Born: Ang May Hong c. 1978; Malaysia
- Died: 12 April 1987 (aged 9); Jalan Ipoh, Kuala Lumpur, Malaysia
- Cause of death: Strangulation
- Education: Keow Nam Primary (incomplete)
- Occupation: Student
- Known for: Victim of a rape-murder case
- Parents: Ang Seng Hoo (father); Yong Yoke Chin (mother)
- Family: Ang Yeow Thian (eldest brother; died 1988); Two unnamed brothers Three unnamed sisters

On 12 April 1987, nine-year-old Malaysian schoolgirl Ang May Hong (洪美凤 Hóng Měifèng) was last seen by her eldest brother when the siblings split up while on the way to buy breakfast at a market near her house in Jalan Ipoh, Kuala Lumpur, Malaysia. Ang's eldest brother, who went back home due to a stomach ache, noticed her disappearance when he returned to find her at where he last saw her.

After searching for three hours, Ang's family discovered the naked body of Ang at an empty house in a nearby desolated area. A metre-long piece of wood with nails had been stuffed into her private parts, rupturing her inner organs, and an autopsy report confirmed that Ang was sexually assaulted by her killer(s) before her death, and it was also speculated that at least eight people were involved in her murder based on the teeth marks left on her body.

In spite of extensive police investigations and public calls for justice, the murder of Ang remains unsolved to this day. The rape and murder of Ang May Hong remains as one of the most horrific murders left unsolved in Malaysia.

== Disappearance and murder ==
The empty house, allegedly a regular haunt for drug addicts, where the naked body of Ang was discovered by her mother.

On 12 April 1987, at Jalan Ipoh, Kuala Lumpur in Malaysia, a nine-year-old girl was found murdered three hours after she disappeared from a market near her home.

On that morning itself, two siblings, 11-year-old Ang Yeow Thian (洪耀添 Hóng Yàotiān) and his nine-year-old sister Ang May Hong, were walking together from their house to buy breakfast at a nearby market. On the way, Yeow Thian, the eldest of three sons and four daughters in his family, suddenly had a stomachache and decided to head back home to use the bathroom. Yeow Thian told Ang, the family's second child, to stay put and wait for him first while he went back temporarily to ease himself. Ten minutes later, Yeow Thian returned to the meeting point to find his sister, but Ang was nowhere to be found. Full of panic for his sister, Yeow Thian spent at least three hours searching for her, and during this period, he also informed his family about Ang's disappearance. Ang's 37-year-old father and bak kut teh seller Ang Seng Hoo (洪成富 Hóng Chéngfù) and his wife went to search for their daughter, and several of Ang's neighbors also helped the family to search for the missing girl.

Eventually, after reaching an empty house at a nearby desolated area, where it was allegedly a place of gathering for drug addicts, Ang's 38-year-old mother Yong Yoke Chin (杨玉清 Yáng Yùqīng) stumbled upon the naked body of Ang May Hong, and to her horror, Ang's body was not only naked, but a metre-long piece of wood with nails was forcibly inserted into her private parts, and a piece of wire was tightly looped around her neck, and there were multiple bruises and bite marks all over the girl's body. The gruesome discovery left her family devastated. At the time of her death, nine-year-old Ang May Hong was a Standard Three student of Keow Nam Primary, Setapak, and she was survived by her parents, three brothers and three sisters.

An autopsy report later showed that Ang was strangled to death by her attacker(s), and she had been raped and sodomized prior to her death. The wooden stick found inside her body had penetrated the internal organs and the heart. After her remains were released back to the family for funeral preparations, Ang's family originally wanted to dress her in red with hopes for her to haunt her murderers for eternity as a ghost but decided against it for fear of her not resting in peace, and dressed her in her favourite blue pyjamas instead.

== Investigations ==
The Royal Malaysia Police classified the case as murder, an offence that carries the death penalty in Malaysia. Based on the post-mortem examination, the police believed that there were no less than eight people responsible for murdering Ang, based on the number of bite marks found on Ang's neck, body and private parts. There were speculations that the murderer(s) were drug addicts and the description of one of the possible culprits was a Chinese man who could speak Tamil. The autopsy report also revealed that Ang might have bitten one of her alleged assailants before her death. The police also publicly appealed for witnesses to come forward with any crucial information to solve the case, as they believed that there could be witnesses who saw the crime due to it happening in broad daylight.

There were a total of three suspects arrested for Ang's murder, one of whom matched the description of the suspect and another was a long-time customer of Ang's father's restaurant. The trio's dental profile were used to make plaster dentures to compare to the teeth marks left on Ang's corpse. Eventually, the police released the three suspects as there was insufficient evidence to connect any of the trio to the girl's murder, and none of their dental profile matched the teeth marks left on Ang's body. Due to the lack of advanced DNA testing and forensic technology at that time, the police were further hindered in their progress of solving the case.

The police, in a desperate effort to apprehend the murderer(s), announced that a reward of RM10,000, which was later raised to twice the amount, would be given to those who could provide crucial information to crack the Ang May Hong case. The reward itself was indefinitely in effect as long as the killer remains at large, but it failed to yield further clues to solve the murder. In the following months or years, whenever there were cases of sexual violence occurring, including rape and molestation that involved children especially, the police would investigate if any of the suspects in these cases were possible culprits behind the murder of Ang.

Subsequently, in September 1987, when a 21-year-old woman named Fong Kim Kie was raped and murdered, the police suspected the culprit to be the same person responsible for the murder of Ang, given the similarities in the manner of how the victims died and sexually assaulted.

In 2007, 20 years after the killing of Ang, the Malaysian police confirmed that they were still regularly investigating the case of Ang's death and other cold cases to continue seeking clues to crack these cases, and it remained open for investigations as long as the perpetrator(s) involved were not caught and brought to justice.

Despite the extensive investigations, the murder of Ang May Hong turned cold and remains unsolved as of today.

== Alleged killer's confession letters ==
The first anonymous letter, mailed over to Shin Min Daily News (Malaysia edition), contained the confession of the writer, who claimed to be one of the killers responsible for Ang's death

In April 1987, shortly after the murder of Ang, the local press received letters from a man who chose to remain anonymous, but confessed that he was one of the men responsible for the murder. In the letter, the writer admitted that he was part of a group of drug addicts who had previously attacked several young girls and raped them before killing them to satisfy their sexual lust, and Ang was their latest victim. When the police were asked about the letters, a police representative stated that any appropriate course of action would be taken if the self-confessed killer surrendered himself.

In his following two letters, the writer, who claimed to be remorseful, stated that he was willing to surrender himself, but on the condition that he received forgiveness and he should receive a monetary sum of RM30,000 to support his family in his absence, which sparked greater public backlash. Later, the same writer made another letter, stating that he lied about his involvement in the murder and only wrote the letters just to let out his frustration over the frequent public spotlight cast on Ang's case.

After this entry, there were no more letters sent in by the self-confessed perpetrator, and the police were unable to identify him or determine whether he was truly responsible for the rape-murder of Ang.

== Public response ==
A protest banner bearing a bolded message in Chinese: "Justice for Ang May Hong", and another message seeking the public's help to donate for the efforts of bringing Ang's killers to justice

When the murder of Ang May Hong was first revealed to the public, many Malaysians were shocked to hear that a little girl fell victim to a brutal and savage criminal or criminals responsible for her death. Many families with daughters also did not allow their children to go outdoors alone in the aftermath of the case. Across the whole of Malaysia, members of the public set up charity events to gather up donation funds as rewards for finding and catching the killer(s). Ang's family also maintained their support for the investigations to quickly conclude and capture Ang's killer, and publicly appealed for the culprit(s) to surrender himself should he ever felt a shred of remorse or conscience for his actions and were willing to forgive him if he turned himself in.

More than 100 people also gathered outside the bak kut teh shop of Ang's father to protest over the occurrence of sexual violence on minors, and asked for the public to be better protected against potential sexual predators who preyed on children and women. Also, during the protest gathering, a stage play was conducted to tell the story of a sexual predator going after a young girl and illustrate the dangers of sexual violence. Out of sympathy, an old fisherman aged 60 engaged a religious master to conduct rituals to find Ang's killer.

The case of Ang's rape and murder prompted the establishment of the Citizens Against Rape (CAR) campaign during the same year, with the participation of members of the public and All Women's Action Society (AWAM), to raise awareness of the phenomenon of rape and its related laws. It would also become a case study of the organization and other civil groups for the movement of opposing sexual violence on females in Malaysia in the following years since the crime happened., and it would be re-discussed by women's groups in light of any high-profile crimes of rape and murder like the 2000 murder of Noor Suzaily Mukhtar. In fact, in 1986, the year before Ang was murdered, there were more than 680 sexual assault cases happening in Malaysia, which signaled a 30% increase in such cases from the previous year of 1985.

== Fate of Ang's family ==
On 16 August 1988, Ang's eldest brother Ang Yeow Thian died from a liver disease at the age of 12, and the death of their eldest son after losing Ang caused much distress and heartbreak to her parents. Ang's father Ang Seng Hoo continued to sell bak kut teh at the area itself, and on 28 October 1988, the Ang family's bak kut teh shop made the news when a fight broke out between several patrons over a staring incident, and the dispute resulted in the murder of one male patron and five more people injured.

20 years after Ang died, in October 2007, the Ang family spoke up about her case in light of the 2007 murder of Nurin Jazlin, a young girl who disappeared before being found murdered. Ang's parents stated that they hoped for the perpetrators to be brought to justice, but as time passed, they decided to leave it to fate and move on with their lives, and tried to let time to help them cope with their sadness. Ang's mother also stated the family chose to not pursue the matter anymore after the police gradually contacted them less and less with new updates in their investigation process, but the pain of losing Ang lingered on. It was revealed that several years after Ang was killed, the Ang family had moved their bak kut teh restaurant to a new location in Jalan Ipoh, and they were still operating the business at the present location as of October 2007. Like the case of Ang, the killing of Nurin remains unsolved till today.

== Aftermath ==
In the following decades, the murder of Ang May Hong remains as one of Malaysia's most horrific unsolved murders to date. In 1996, Ang's murder ranked the first among the top ten most cold-blooded murders that happened in Malaysia in the past decade. The occurrence of the Ang May Hong murder case also once again brought to light several other cold cases of girls raped and murdered during the past decade, including the 1978 Kuantan rape-murder and the 1978 Penang canal rape-murder.

In 2001, it was revealed by an Indian newspaper The Hindu that during the last 14 years since the murder of Ang, cases of sexual violence against both female minors and adults had been rising in Malaysia and there were increasing concerns about the safety of women in Malaysia. The unsolved murders of Ang and a 17-year-old student Audrey Melissa Bathinathan were cited as the worst of such cases that happened in the past century. According to a report by the All Women's Action Society (AWAM), in Malaysia, an average 4.1 cases of rape were reported daily in 1998, up from 2.4 cases a day in 1993. Also, AWAM continually sought to have the laws on rape reviewed by the Malaysian government even after the death of Ang, which was considered to be a turning point in the need for awareness on the phenomenon of sexual violence against women in Malaysia.

In 2013, after the acquittal of Shahril Jaafar for the 2006 rape and murder of Chee Gaik Yap, an opinion piece published by the Oriental Daily stated that the brutality of Chee's murder was comparable to the Ang May Hong rape-murder case, and these cases highlighted the judicial system's issue of unable to solve a cold case or convicting a person of rape and murder. The acquittal was eventually reversed by the courts upon the prosecution's appeal, and following a re-trial, Shahril was found guilty and sentenced to death for murdering Chee in 2015.

From September 2017 to April 2018, local Chinese-language newspaper China Press began to publish a special series of real-life crime stories, covering the 30 most horrific crimes that happened in Malaysia since the 1970s and updated every Friday. The murder of Ang May Hong was recorded as the fifth volume of the China Press crime story series.

In 2021, a commemorative article was made by Malaysian English-language newspaper The Star, publishing the most shocking and unsolved cases of missing or murdered children, including Ang May Hong, Tin Song Sheng, Audrey Melissa Bathinathan and Nurin Jazlin. The Royal Malaysia Police cited in the article that they have not given up investigating these unsolved cases, and there was a glimmer of hope to re-explore and crack the cases with the advancement of technology, and highlighted the need for parents to be more careful of the safety of their children to avoid them going missing.

After her retirement in 2022, a journalist who formerly wrote for the China Press recalled her past experience of covering the Ang May Hong rape-murder case back in 1987. She stated that at the sight of Ang's body, she felt sympathy and sadness for the girl, and even the mortuary workers could not hide their revolt and condemned the murderer for doing such an inhumane thing on a little girl.

== See also ==
- List of unsolved murders (1980–1999)
- Murder of Nurin Jazlin
