= Zaki Azmi =

Malaysian judge and lawyer

Yang Amat Berbahagia Dato' Seri Indera Setia Tun Dato' Seri Zaki Azmi SSM SSDK SPMK SPCM PSM PJN DGSM DSMT DSDK JSM KMN
- زكي عزمي

6th Chief Justice of Malaysia
- In office 21 October 2008 – 9 September 2011
- Nominated by: Abdullah Ahmad Badawi
- Appointed by: Mizan Zainal Abidin
- Preceded by: Abdul Hamid Mohamad
- Succeeded by: Arifin Zakaria

6th President of the Court of Appeal of Malaysia
- In office 11 December 2007 – 18 October 2008
- Nominated by: Abdullah Ahmad Badawi
- Appointed by: Mizan Zainal Abidin
- Preceded by: Abdul Hamid Mohamad
- Succeeded by: Alauddin Mohd Sheriff

Personal details
- Born: Zaki bin Azmi; 12 September 1945 (age 81) Alor Setar, Kedah, British Military Administration (Malaya) (now Malaysia)
- Spouse: Nik Sazlina Mohd Zain
- Parent: Azmi Mohamed (father)
- Education: Lincoln's Inn
- Profession: Barrister

Zaki bin Azmi (Jawi: زكي بن عزمي; born 12 September 1945) is a Malaysian barrister who served as the sixth Chief Justice of Malaysia. He was appointed by the Yang di-Pertuan Agong (King of Malaysia) on 21 October 2008 after his predecessor, Abdul Hamid Mohamad, retired from office.

Zaki, who was previously a practising lawyer, was directly appointed a Federal Court judge on 5 September 2007—a first in Malaysian judicial history. Zaki is the son of former Lord President of the Federal Court Azmi Mohamed. He was appointed president of the Court of Appeal in December 2007.

Zaki's appointment as a Federal Court judge has been criticised by the Opposition citing his swift ascendency, presence of more senior judges, and the fact that he was a legal adviser to the United Malays National Organisation (UMNO), the major component party in the ruling coalition, just prior to his appointment as a judge.

== Background ==
Early in his life, Zaki attended school in Ibrahim School, Sultan Abdul Hamid College in Alor Setar, furthering his studies at Anderson School in Ipoh and finally in English College Johore Bahru.

=== As barrister ===
Zaki became a barrister through Lincoln's Inn in London, served at the Attorney General's Chambers from 1969 to 1970, and later served the subordinate courts from 1970 to 1973. In 1973, Zaki returned to the Attorney General's Chambers serving as a Federal Counsel and in 1976 he became a senior Federal Counsel under the Ministry of Home Affairs. Zaki was called to the Malayan Bar in 1983 and practised as a lawyer at Shahrizat Rashid & Lee beginning in 1985.

Zaki also served as a legal adviser to United Malays National Organisation (UMNO), where he was the party's Disciplinary Committee chairman and had served the party in other areas as well.

=== As Federal Court judge ===
On 5 September 2007, Zaki was appointed Federal Court judge. Later on 11 December 2007 he became the President of the Court of Appeal of Malaysia. Zaki finally became Chief Justice on 21 October 2008, having served little more than a year in Malaysia's superior court system. His appointment as Federal Court judge as well as subsequent promotions has sparked concern by various segments of the public due to his close ties with UMNO. This concern became more apparent as he has only served the judiciary for less than 5 years in total.

Zaki began his job by announcing that he would get tough and take action against errant judges to prevent the image of the judiciary from being tarnished.

=== Recent career ===
In 2018, Zaki Azmi was hired as the Chief Justice of Dubai International Financial Centre Courts.

== Controversy ==
On 7 November 2008, Zaki Azmi made the announcement that two retired judges were suspected to be corrupt. He said he knew them personally but did not take action against them. Further to this, there have been strong links between Zaki and the government of Malaysia which would have signalled a conflict of interest should he become the Chief Justice of Malaysia. Recently, it was revealed that a company linked to former chief justice Zaki Azmi and UMNO lawyer Hafarizam Harun may have been given the concession for the Kinrara-Damansara Exchange (Kidex), a road project awarded by the government.

The award of the contract was purportedly made by the government just before the CJ retired. His wife is the shareholder of the company that is said to have been awarded the lucrative contract valued at RM2.2 billion.

Before his retirement in September 2011, the Judges' Remuneration Act (JRA) 1971 was amended to allow a chief justice, president or chief judge to claim for maximum pension after holding the office for more than three years. Previously, the provision required a chief justice to also serve a total of 10 years as a judge, out of which, three years must be spent holding the position of chief justice, president or chief judge. Opposition lawmaker Lim Kit Siang as well as some lawyers alleged that the amendment was made for the sole benefit of Zaki Azmi. Zaki had spent less than five years as a judge but more than three years in aggregate as president of the court of appeal and as chief justice.

== Honours ==
=== Honours of Malaysia ===
- Malaysia
  - Officer of the Order of the Defender of the Realm (KMN) (1981)
  - Companion of the Order of Loyalty to the Crown of Malaysia (JSM) (1992)
  - Commander of the Order of Meritorious Service (PJN) – Datuk (1999)
  - Commander of the Order of Loyalty to the Crown of Malaysia (PSM) – Tan Sri (2000)
  - Grand Commander of the Order of Loyalty to the Crown of Malaysia (SSM) – Tun (2009)
- Kedah
  - Knight Companion of the Order of Loyalty to the Royal House of Kedah (DSDK) – Dato' (1992)
  - Knight Grand Companion of the Order of Loyalty to the Royal House of Kedah (SSDK) – Dato' Seri (2008)
  - Gelaran Orang Besar Lapan Negeri Kedah – Dato' Seri Indera Setia (2025)
- Kelantan
  - Knight Grand Commander of the Order of the Crown of Kelantan (SPMK) – Dato' (2010)
- Malacca
  - Grand Commander of the Order of Malacca (DGSM) – Datuk Seri (2010)
- Perak
  - Knight Grand Commander of the Order of Cura Si Manja Kini (SPCM) – Dato' Seri (2010)
- Terengganu
  - Knight Companion of the Order of Sultan Mahmud I of Terengganu (DSMT) – Dato' (1997)

Legal offices
Preceded by Abdul Hamid Mohamad	Chief Justice of Malaysia; 2008–2011	Succeeded by Arifin Zakaria
Preceded by Abdul Hamid Mohamad	President of the Court of Appeal of Malaysia; 2007–2008	Succeeded by Alauddin Mohd Sheriff
