= Order of Loyalty to the Crown of Kelantan =

Honorific order of the Sultanate of Kelantan

Order of Loyalty to the Crown of Kelantan Darjah Kebesaran Setia Mahkota Kelantan

Awarded by Sultan of Kelantan
- Type: Order
- Established: 10 December 1967
- Royal house: House of Long Yunus
- Ribbon: Dark purple; White
- Motto: Kerana Allah, Raja dan Negeri (Note: Jawi: كران ﷲ، راج دان نڬري) (For God, Ruler and the State)
- Status: Currently constituted
- Founder: Yahya Petra of Kelantan
- Sovereign: Muhammad V of Kelantan
- Grades: Knight Grand Commander; Knight Commander; Commander; Officer; Member
- Post-nominals: S.P.S.K.; D.P.S.K.; P.S.K.; B.S.K.; A.S.K.

Precedence
- Next (higher): Order of the Noble Crown of Kelantan
- Next (lower): Order of the Services to the Crown of Kelantan
- Ribbon bar of the Order

The Most Distinguished Order of Loyalty to the Crown of Kelantan or the Star of Ibrahim (Malay: Darjah Kebesaran Setia Mahkota Kelantan Yang Amat Terbilang or Bintang Al-Ibrahimi) is an honorific order of the Sultanate of Kelantan.

== History ==
The order was established on 10 December 1967 and first conferred on 10 July 1968 as recognition a distinguished civil service for the nation and the state of Kelantan.

Prior the establishment of the Order of the Noble Crown of Kelantan in 1988 and the Order of the Services to the Crown of Kelantan in 2016, military and uniformed civil service personnel also were conferred this order, although rank officer and member of this order still be conferred to military personnel until today.

== Order ranks ==
The order has five ranks:

=== Knight Grand Commander ===
Knight Grand Commander of the Order of Loyalty to the Crown of Kelantan (S.P.S.K.) (Malay: Darjah Seri Paduka Setia Mahkota Kelantan (Al-Ibrahimi I))

This rank is limited to 50 living recipients at any time, except foreign citizens who are conferred honorary awards. The recipient of this award receives the title Dato' and his wife Datin.

This rank comprises collar, sash, breast star and badge.

=== Knight Commander ===
Knight Commander of the Order of Loyalty to the Crown of Kelantan (D.P.S.K.) (Malay: Darjah Dato' Paduka Setia Mahkota Kelantan (Al-Ibrahimi II))

This rank is limited to 75 living recipients at any time, except foreign citizens who are conferred honorary awards. The recipient of this award receives the title Dato' and his wife Datin.

This rank comprises neck ribbon, breast star and badge.

=== Commander ===
Commander of the Order of Loyalty to the Crown of Kelantan (P.S.K.) (Malay: Paduka Setia Mahkota Kelantan (Al-Ibrahimi III))

There is no limit to the number of persons to be awarded this honour and can also be conferred on foreign citizens as an honorary award. It does not carry any title.

This rank comprises neck ribbon and badge.

=== Officer ===
Officer of the Order of Loyalty to the Crown of Kelantan (B.S.K.) (Malay: Bentara Setia Mahkota Kelantan (Al-Ibrahimi IV))

There is no limit to the number of persons to be awarded this honour and can also be conferred on foreign citizens as an honorary award. It does not carry any title.

This rank comprises only gold badge with medal ribbon.

=== Member ===
Member of the Order of Loyalty to the Crown of Kelantan (A.S.K.) (Malay: Ahli Setia Mahkota Kelantan (Al-Ibrahimi V))

There is no limit to the number of persons to be awarded this honour and can also be conferred on foreign citizens as an honorary award. It does not carry any title.

This rank comprises only silver badge with medal ribbon.

== Notable recipients ==
=== Knights Grand Commander (S.P.S.K.) ===
- 1981: Zain Hashim
- 1981: Arshad Ayub
- 2005: Arifin Zakaria
- 2006: Richard Malanjum
- 2009: Chor Chee Heung
- 2009: Ismail Omar
- 2009: Mohd Shariff Omar
- 2012: Mohd Irwan Serigar Abdullah
- 2013: Mohamed Apandi Ali
- 2013: Syed Danial Syed Ahmad
- 2015: Mazlan Lazim
- 2015: Mohd Zaman Khan
- 2016: Rohana Yusuf
- 2016: Tengku Maimun Tuan Mat
- 2018: Wan Ahmad Dahlan Abdul Aziz
- 2022: Azam Baki
- 2025: Wan Ahmad Farid Wan Salleh
- 2025: Mohd Dusuki Mokhtar

=== Knights Commander (D.P.S.K.) ===
- 1983: Yaacob Mohd Zain
- 2006: Tengku Maimun Tuan Mat
- 2006: Zulkifli Abdullah
- 2007: Nik Mustapha Raja Abdullah
- 2007: Rohana Yusuf
- 2009: Amar Singh Ishar Singh
- 2010: Syed Ismail Syed Azizan
- 2011: Mazlan Lazim
- 2011: Mohd Bakri Mohd Zinin
- 2011: ~~Mohammad Agus Yusoff~~ (revoked on 2 December 2023)
- 2012: Jalaluddin Abdul Rahman
- 2016: Mohd Dusuki Mokhtar
- 2016: Wan Ahmad Dahlan Abdul Aziz
- 2017: Mazlan Ismail
- 2025: Arham Abdullah
- Unknown: Abdullah Ayub

=== Commanders (P.S.K.) ===
- 2007: Mazlan Lazim
- 2012: Husaini Omar
- Unknown: Aini Ideris
- Unknown: Borhan Ahmad

=== Officers (B.S.K.) ===
- 2010: Muhammad Hafizuddeain Jantan
- 2010: Mohd Na'im Mokhtar
- Unknown: Borhan Ahmad
- Unknown: Zulkifli Zainal Abidin

=== Members (A.S.K.) ===
- Unknown: Ahmad Terrirudin Mohd Salleh
- Unknown: Mohd Dusuki Mokhtar
- Unknown: Zulkifeli Mohd Zin

== See also ==
- Orders, decorations, and medals of the Malaysian states and federal territories#Kelantan
- Orders, decorations, and medals of Kelantan
- List of post-nominal letters (Kelantan)
