= Kalimullah Masheerul Hassan =

Malaysian businessman and journalist (born 1958)

Yang Berbahagia Dato' Seri Kalimullah Masheerul Hassan PJN DGPN DPCM DPMK DSPN DSAP
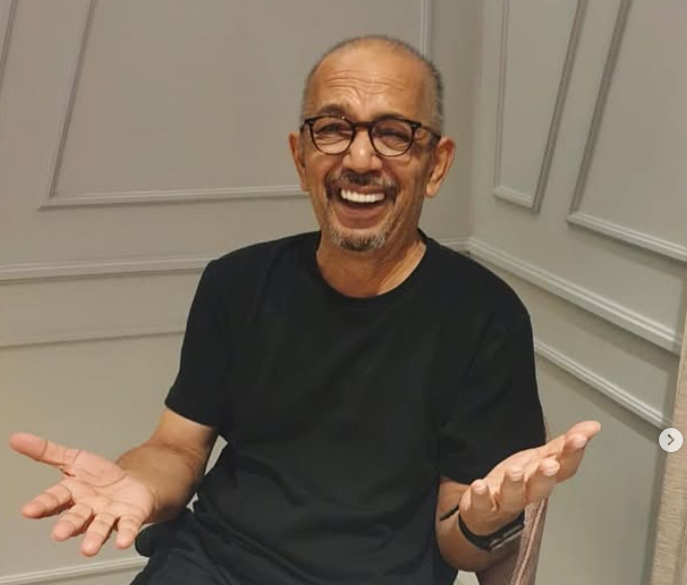
- Kalimullah Hassan circa November 2021
- Born: March 15, 1958 (age 68); Pengkalan Hulu, Perak, Malaysia
- Education: Methodist Boys' School, Penang
- Occupations: Journalist, Media Executive, Businessman
- Years active: 1979–present
- Known for: Group Editor-in-Chief of the New Straits Times; Co-founder of ECM Libra
- Spouse: Helinna Hanum Dadameah
- Children: 4

Kalimullah Masheerul Hassan (born 15 March 1958) is a Malaysian businessman, veteran journalist, and former media executive. He is the co-founder of the financial services group ECM Libra and served as the Group Editor-in-Chief of the New Straits Times. He is also known for his philanthropic work through the ECM Libra Foundation.

== Early Life & Education ==
Kalimullah was born in Pengkalan Hulu, Perak. He is of Pakistani descent; his grandfather, Tufail Ahmad Khan, migrated from Uttar Pradesh to Malaya in 1908.

He received his early education at Pykett Methodist School and later attended the Methodist Boys' School in Penang, completing his Higher School Certificate in 1974.

== Career ==
=== Journalism ===
Kalimullah began his career in journalism in 1979 as a cadet reporter for The Echo in Penang. In 1980, he joined The Star, where he eventually led the political desk.

Throughout the 1980s and 1990s, he worked as a correspondent for several international and regional news agencies, including Reuters, The Straits Times (Singapore), and Time Magazine.

In 2002, he was appointed Chairman of the Malaysian national news agency Bernama for a two-year term.

He resigned in 2004 to join the New Straits Times Press (NSTP) Berhad as Group Editor-in-Chief and deputy chairman. During his tenure, he oversaw the controversial but commercially significant transition of the New Straits Times from a broadsheet to a tabloid-sized "compact" format. He retired from the editorial role in late 2005 but remained on the board of directors until 2008.

=== Politics ===
In 1988 Kalimullah became the press secretary to the then deputy prime minister of Malaysia, Tun Ghafar Baba.

=== Business ===
In 1995, Kalimullah was made the General Manager of FACB Berhad and handled several business operations of the group in Cambodia. He was appointed director of FACB Berhad and FACB Industries Incorporated Berhad on 2 July 2001 but resigned a year later. Kalimullah also held directorships in TA Enterprise Berhad, TA Securities Berhad, TA Unit Trust Management Berhad, MBf Holdings Berhad and the then MBf Capital Berhad which was replaced by MBf Corporation Berhad after its restructuring scheme.

In 2002, Kalimullah co-founded ECM Libra, a boutique financial services firm, with partners Lim Kian Onn and David Chua. The firm later merged with Avenue Capital to form ECM Libra Avenue, where Kalimullah served as Executive Chairman.

Beyond financial services, he was an early investor and board member of AirAsia X, the long-haul arm of the low-cost carrier group AirAsia.

He also previously as a board member of the Multimedia Development Corporation of Malaysia.

In 2009, he stepped down from his executive business roles to focus on investments and charitable endeavours.

On the 16th of June 2026, the ECM Libra Group announced that Kalimullah had relinquished his position as Alternate Director effective immediately following the conclusion of the company's 21st Annual General Meeting.

== Philanthropy & Public Service ==
Kalimullah is the co-founder of the ECM Libra Foundation, a non-profit organization established in 2004. The foundation focuses on providing educational opportunities and financial aid to underprivileged Malaysians, regardless of race or religion. He has been vocal about the need for private sector intervention in the national education system to bridge the poverty gap.

Kalimullah has also previously served as a member of the board of trustees of the Tunku Abdul Rahman Foundation, as a member of the National Unity Advisory Panel and as a member of the National Information Technology Council.

== Publications ==
In 2016, Kalimullah published "The Malaysia That Could Be", a collection of his columns and essays written over a decade. The book provides a critical analysis of Malaysian politics, social cohesion, and the administration of Prime Minister Abdullah Ahmad Badawi. In his writing, he often advocates for moderate Islam and multiculturalism, drawing on his personal experiences as a Malaysian of minority descent.

== Honours ==
=== Honours of Malaysia ===
- Malaysia
  - Commander of the Order of Meritorious Service (PJN) - Datuk (2008)
- Penang
  - Commander of the Order of the Defender of State (DGPN) – Dato' Seri (2007)
  - Officer of the Order of the Defender of State (DSPN) – Dato' (2001)
- Perak
  - Knight of the Order of Cura Si Manja Kini (DPCM) – Dato’ (2007)
- Kelantan
  - Knight Commander of the Order of the Crown of Kelantan (DPMK) – Dato’ (2004)
- Pahang
  - Knight Companion of the Order of Sultan Ahmad Shah of Pahang (DSAP) – Dato’ (2004)
