= Abdullah Sanusi Ahmad =

Malaysian public servant and academian

Abdullah Sanusi bin Ahmad (30 January 1936 – 29 November 2003) was the sixth Vice-Chancellor of University of Malaya (UM) and the first President and Vice-Chancellor of Open University Malaysia (OUM).

During his lifetime, he was recognised as an institution builder and pioneer in the establishment of the National Institute of Public Administration (INTAN) and the Malaysian Administrative Modernisation and Management Planning Unit (MAMPU).

== Background ==
He was born on 30 January 1936 in Kuala Pilah, Negeri Sembilan and was married to Puan Sri Hashimah Hj Ismail and was blessed with 4 sons.

== Educational background ==
He received his early education at Tuanku Muhammad School (TMS), Kuala Pilah, Negeri Sembilan. He obtained his first degree in Economics, Malay and Dutch Studies in 1960 and 1961 from the University of Malaya Singapore (1960) and the University of Malaya Kuala Lumpur (1961). He then obtained a Certificate in Government and Development, Oxford University, United Kingdom (1967) and a Certificate in Management Services, Royal Institute of Public Administration (London) (1968). He then continued his studies to the second degree level at University of Pittsburgh and University of Southern California, United States. He eventually completed his doctorate at the same university.

== Career ==
He held several important positions in the government, including Public Director of the Malaysian Administrative Modernisation and Management Planning Unit (MAMPU), Prime Minister's Department (Apr. 1977-Dec 1980), Secretary-General of the Ministry of Public Enterprises (Jan. 1981-March 1986), Vice President of the PETRONAS Human Resource Management Sector (Apr. 1986-1994), Vice Chancellor of the University of Malaya from 1994 to 2000 and President and Chief Executive cum Vice-Chancellor of Open University Malaysia (OUM) from April 2001 to 2003.

In the cooperative sector, he has been a Board Member of large companies such as the National Rice and Rice Board, Petronas Carigali Sdn. Bhd. and Nationwide Express Courier Bhd.

== Death ==
He died on 29 November 2003, at the age of 67 due to heart attack. Abdullah Sanusi will always be remembered as the pioneer of open and distant learning in Malaysia and was instrumental in the setting up of Open University Malaysia (OUM). In his memory, the digital library at OUM was renamed Tan Sri Dr. Abdullah Sanusi Digital Library in 2004.

== Publications ==
1. The Malaysian bureaucracy: four decades of development. Malaysia: Pearson Prentice Hall, 2003.
2. Perkembangan pentadbiran awam dan pengurusan: koleksi ceramah umum Abdullah Sanusi Ahmad. Malaysia: Dewan Bahasa dan Pustaka, 1994.
