= Malaysia Crime Prevention Foundation =

Malaysia Crime Prevention Foundation Yayasan Pencegahan Jenayah Malaysia MCPF
- Formation: January 11, 1993; 33 years ago
- Type: Non-profit; NGO
- Headquarters: B-3A-13, Block B Level 4 Unit 13, Megan Avenue II, Jalan Yap Kwan Seng, 50450 Kuala Lumpur, Malaysia. Tel. +603-2181 0055 / +603-2181 0555
- Location: Malaysia
- Members: Invitation
- Patron: YAB Datuk Seri Anwar Ibrahim
- Chairman: YB Datuk Seri Saifuddin Nasution Ismail
- Senior Vice-Chairman: YBhg. Dato' Sri Ayub Yaakob
- Website: www.mcpf.org.my

The Malaysia Crime Prevention Foundation (MCPF; Malay: Yayasan Pencegahan Jenayah Malaysia) is a Malaysian non-profit governmental organization tasked to promote awareness in crime prevention and rehabilitation of offenders at all times.

It is established on 11 January 1993 and officially inaugurated by the then-Malaysian Prime Minister, Mahathir Mohamad who also served as the Patron of the foundation.

== See also ==
- Crime in Malaysia
- Prevention of Crime Act 1959
