= Murder of Nurin Jazlin =

2007 unsolved murder in Kuala Lumpur, Malaysia

Nurin Jazlin
- Born: Nurin Jazlin Binti Jazimin; 11 September 1999; Kuala Lumpur, Malaysia
- Died: 16 September 2007 (aged 8); Kuala Lumpur, Malaysia
- Cause of death: Murdered
- Resting place: Taman Ibukota Muslim Cemetery, Setapak, Kuala Lumpur
- Citizenship: Malaysia
- Education: Sekolah Rendah Kebangsaan Desa Setapak, Setapak, Kuala Lumpur
- Known for: Murder victim
- Parent(s): Jazimin Abdul Jalil (father); Norazian Bistaman (mother)

Nurin Jazlin Binti Jazimin (11 September 1999 – 16 September 2007) was an eight-year-old Malaysian murder victim, who was originally reported missing after she had gone to a night market near her house in Section 1, Wangsa Maju, Kuala Lumpur to buy a hair clip on the night of 16 August 2007. Her parents filed a missing person report with the police and a search for her was undertaken in the subsequent weeks by several organisations, including the news media and NGOs. Police were able to find footage from a nearby CCTV camera, showing her being dragged into a white van the night she went missing. Her murder has not yet been solved.

== Discovery and identification ==
On the morning of 17 September 2007, a brand-new gym bag was left in front of a shop lot in PJS 1/48, Petaling Jaya, discovered by the shop owner. It contained an unidentified child's naked body which had been stuffed in the fetal position; police believed that she had been dead for more than six hours before the discovery. A cucumber and a brinjal were found stuffed inside her genitals and had caused her rectum to rupture. It was determined that bacterial infection had contributed to her death.

At the time, Nurin Jazlin's parents were not able to identify the body as their daughter's due to the changes in her physical features; it was even suggested that the child might be a foreigner, as she lacked the scar which would be caused by the mandatory BCG vaccination against tuberculosis. Her parents initially maintained hope that their daughter might be alive and were the victims of several prank calls from people claiming that Nurin was under their care. Later DNA tests conducted confirmed the body as Nurin Jazlin's.

Her body was later claimed by her family from the Kuala Lumpur Hospital (HKL) and she was buried at the Muslim cemetery in Taman Ibukota, Setapak, Kuala Lumpur, on 21 September after the Friday noon prayers.

== Investigation ==
The nature of her brutal torture and eventual death at the hands of an unknown assailant, suspected to be a psychopathic killer, sparked outrage throughout the country. Malaysian media and Internet blogs have been filled with anger and disbelief in reaction to the case, and the murder is widely considered to be "the country's most horrifying crime in years." The case led to a statement by then Prime Minister Abdullah Ahmad Badawi about the possibility of publicising the list of convicted child sex offenders. Inspector-general of police Musa Hassan initially suggested that he would investigate whether Nurin's parents had been negligent, an offence which could lead to charges under Section 33 of the Child Act 2001. The suggestion provoked public outcry, most prominently from Lee Lam Thye, chairman of the Malaysia Crime Prevention Foundation, who responded that punishing the parents further would be unfair.

On 28 September, federal agents raided a shop in Section 7, Shah Alam, where they arrested four men and one woman between the ages of 27 and 35 in connection with the murder. The woman was released after questioning, while the men were remanded to police custody for seven days. However, they were released unconditionally three days later due to lack of evidence. Police then proceeded to put up an award of RM10,000 for information leading to the arrest of Nurin's killer; an anonymous private businessman agreed to match that with an additional RM10,000. On 2 October, police arrested an Indonesian woman at a market in Nilai, Negeri Sembilan; when confronted, the woman attempted to swallow a SIM card she was carrying.

On 11 October, police released video footage captured by a CCTV camera near a shoplot in Petaling Utama, Petaling Jaya, where the sports bag containing the body of eight-year-old Nurin was found. The CCTV footage was sent on 26 September to the FBI to enhance the clarity of the blurred images. The first clip, captured at about 1 pm on September 16, showed a motorcyclist carrying a sports bag (with Nurin's body in it) and leaving it at the shoplot. The second clip, recorded one hour later, showed a woman loitering around the shoplot who was later picked up by three men arriving at the scene. The enhanced footage, however, failed to reveal the face of the motorcyclist and the license plate of the motorcycle.

In 2018, Nurin's father pleaded to the police to reopen his daughter’s case and investigate it using the latest technology.

== See also ==
- List of unsolved murders (2000–present)
- Murder of Ang May Hong
