= Mohd Dusuki Mokhtar =

Malaysian civil servant

Yang Berbahagia Tan Sri Dato' Mohd Dusuki Mokhtar PMN SPSK DPSK JSM ASK

11th Attorney General of Malaysia
- Incumbent
- Assumed office 12 November 2024
- Monarch: Sultan Ibrahim Iskandar
- Prime Minister: Anwar Ibrahim
- Preceded by: Ahmad Terrirudin Mohd Salleh

Personal details
- Born: Mohd Dusuki bin Mokhtar; 6 March 1967 (age 59) Machang, Kelantan
- Education: International Islamic University Malaysia (IIUM) (LLB); University of Wollongong (LLM)
- Occupation: Lawyer

Mohd Dusuki bin Mokhtar (born 6 March 1967) is a Malaysian lawyer who has served as the 11th Attorney General of Malaysia since 12 November 2024.

== Early life ==
Mohd Dusuki Mokhtar was born in Machang, Kelantan.

== Education ==
Mohd Dusuki Mokhtar holds Bachelor of Laws from International Islamic University Malaysia (IIUM) and Master of Laws from University of Wollongong respectively.

== Career ==
Mohd Dusuki Mokhtar was appointed as Attorney General of Malaysia on 12 November 2024. Prior to that he was the Head of Trial and Appeal Division at the Attorney General's Chambers (AGC).

== Honours ==
- Malaysia
  - Commander of the Order of the Defender of the Realm (PMN) – Tan Sri (2025)
  - Companion of the Order of Loyalty to the Crown of Malaysia (JSM) (2016)
- Kelantan
  - Knight Grand Commander of the Order of Loyalty to the Crown of Kelantan (SPSK) – Dato' (2025)
  - Knight Commander of the Order of Loyalty to the Crown of Kelantan (DPSK) – Dato' (2016)
  - Member of the Order of Loyalty to the Crown of Kelantan (ASK)
