= Arthur Hugh Peters Humphrey =

British colonial administrator (1911–2001)

Arthur Hugh Peters Humphrey CMG OBE PMN
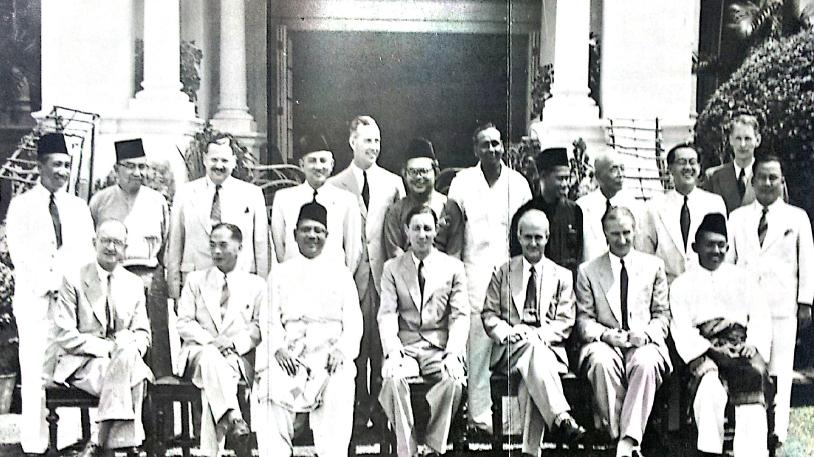
- Members of the Cabinet of the Federation of Malaya, 1955. Humphrey standing 5th from left
- Born: 18 June 1911
- Died: 10 September 2001 (aged 90)
- Education: Merton College, Oxford
- Occupation: Colonial administrator
- Children: 3 daughters

Arthur Hugh Peters Humphrey (18 June 1911 – 10 September 2001) was a British colonial administrator who served as Secretary for Defence of the Federation of Malaya from 1953 to 1957.

== Early life and education ==
Humphrey was born on 18 June 1911, the son of Arthur George Humphrey, a bank manager. He was educated at Eastbourne College and Merton College, Oxford where he received his BA (Maths) in 1933 and MA in 1948.

== Career ==
Humphrey joined the Malayan Civil Service as a cadet in 1934, and served in various posts. From 1936 to 1938 he served as Private Secretary to the Governor of the Straits Settlements and High Commissioner for Malay States. From 1940 to 1942, he served as Resident, Labuan and, during the Japanese occupation of British Borneo, was interned in Borneo from 1942 to 1945.

After the Second World War, Humphrey completed a course at the Imperial Defence College. From 1949, he was employed for two years in the Internal Security Branch of the Chief Secretary's Office involved in Malayan Emergency and defence work, and was primarily responsible for the repatriation of thousands of detained persons and their dependants.

From 1953 to 1957, he served as Secretary for Defence and Internal Security of the Federation of Malaya. He also served as a member of the Federal Legislative and Executive Councils (1953–1956), and was a member of the Director of Operations Committee dealing with the Emergency. As Defence Secretary, he served as a member of the first cabinet of the Federation of Malaya headed by Tunku Abdul Rahman. In 1956, when he lost his position in the cabinet after a ministerial reshuffle, he was appointed as Permanent Secretary for Defence and Internal Security working directly under Tunku Abdul Rahman who took over the defence portfolio.

From 1957 to 1959, he served as Secretary to the Treasury of the Federation of Malaya. In 1959, he held talks with the British government in London on proposed grants to the Federation to fight the Emergency, and the transfer of British military installations in Malaya to the armed forces of the Federation.

From 1960 to 1961, he served as Director of Technical Assistance, Commonwealth Relations Office. From 1961 to 1971, he served as Controller of Special Projects at the Overseas Development Administration of the Foreign and Commonwealth Office, and headed the United Kingdom delegations to Colombo Plan conferences in Tokyo and Kuala Lumpur.

== Personal life and death ==
Humphrey married Mary Macpherson in 1948 and they had three daughters.

Humphrey died on 10 September 2001, aged 90.

== Honours ==
Humphrey was appointed Officer of the Order of the British Empire (OBE) in the 1952 New Year Honours. He was awarded the Coronation Medal in 1953. In 1958, he was awarded the Panglima Mangku Negara (Hon.). He was appointed Companion of the Order of St Michael and St George (CMG) in the 1959 New Year Honours.
