= Open University Malaysia =

Private university in Malaysia

- Universiti Terbuka Malaysia (Malay)
- Logo of the Open University Malaysia
- Motto: Universiti Digital untuk Semua
- Motto in English: Digital University for All
- Type: Private
- Established: 2000; 26 years ago
- Affiliations: AAOU, ICDE, COL
- Chancellor: Tan Sri Azman Hashim
- Vice-Chancellor: Prof. Dato' Dr. Ahmad Izanee Awang
- Location: Kelana Jaya, Selangor, Malaysia
- Campus: Urban
- Colours: Blue, Silver, and White
- Website: www.oum.edu.my

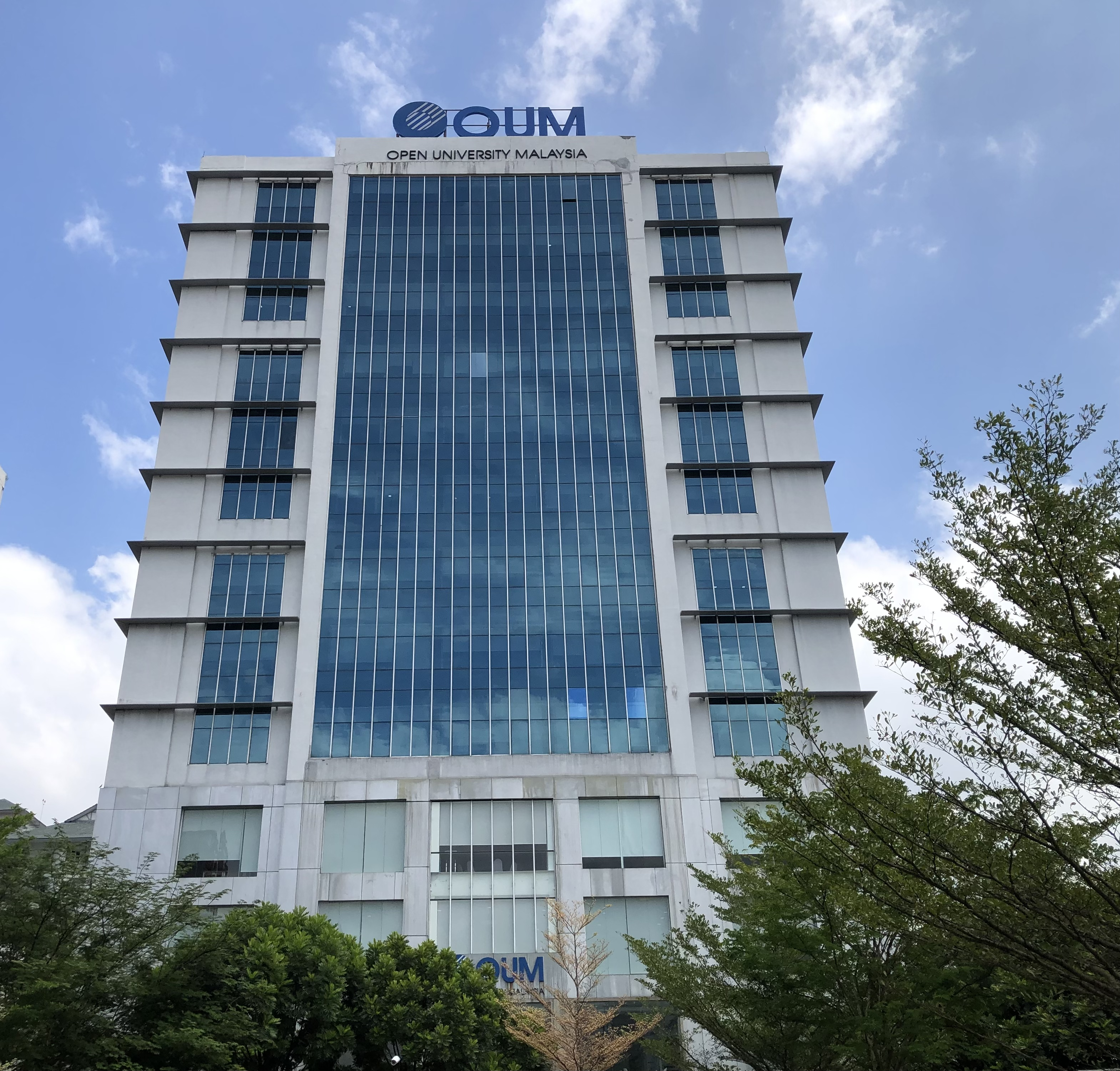
OUM main campus in Kelana Jaya, Petaling Jaya

Open University Malaysia, abbreviated as OUM (formerly UNITEM), is the seventh private university in Malaysia. It is owned by Multimedia Technology Enhancement Operations (METEOR) Sdn. Bhd, a consortium of 11 Malaysian public universities.

The main campus is located at Menara OUM, Kelana Centre Point, Kelana Jaya, Selangor. Additionally, there are more than 30 learning centres throughout Malaysia, out of which 10 are regional learning centres.

== History ==
During the 1990s a rising delivery method gaining popularity and frequently discussed was the Open and Distance Education concept. There was a need to democratise education, paving the way for a wider population to have access to education at an affordable price. Consequently, in August 1999, the Minister of Education called upon Multimedia Technology Enhancement Operations Sdn. Bhd. (METEOR) to establish an open university in Malaysia. METEOR was headed by Tan Sri Dr Abdullah Sanusi Ahmad, who later on became the first Vice-Chancellor of Open University Malaysia. The action taken by the Minister of Education, Dato' Seri Najib Tun Razak, resulted in the founding of Open University Malaysia (OUM) in August 2000.

OUM initially opened its doors to 753 learners in 2001 as the first open and distance learning university in the country. OUM was officially launched by the then Prime Minister YAB Dato Seri Dr. Mahathir Mohamad on August 26, 2002. More than two decades later in 2023, OUM had about 30,000 active students and produced more than 103,000 graduates. In the same year, QS Stars had assessed OUM's online learning for three years and granted OUM a 5-Star rating .

== Chancellors ==
Currently, the vice-chancellor of OUM is Prof Dr Ahmad Izanee Awang. The first chancellor was the late Endon Mahmood (the wife of fifth Prime Minister Abdullah Badawi) who was proclaimed on 16 December 2004. On 8 December 2007, Jeanne Abdullah was proclaimed as the new chancellor of OUM. Recently, on 9 May 2026, she was replaced by Tan Sri Azman Hashim who was OUM's Pro-Chancellor for the past two decades.

== Notable alumni ==
- Dato' Seri Saarani Mohamad - Bachelor of Human Resource Management with Honours, current Chief Minister of Perak, politician
- Dato' Ramli Mohd Nor - Master's Degree in Public Administration, Deputy Speaker of Dewan Rakyat 1, Member of Parliament (MP) for Cameron Highlands
- Soo Wincci - PhD in Business Administration, Miss World Malaysia 2008, International Recording Artiste, actress, composer, host and entrepreneur
- Thinaah Muralitharan - Bachelor of Education in Teaching English as a Second Language (TESL). Malaysian badminton player women’s double.Gold medal winner of the 2022 Commonwealth Games.
- Anas Alam Faizli - PhD in Business Administration, CEO of Duopharma Biotech Berhad
- Vanida Imran - Bachelor of Arts (English Studies) Honours, Miss World Malaysia 1993, actress, nona host
- Daniel Lee Chee Hun - Master of Business Administration (MBA). Singer, 2nd season Malaysian Idol winner

== See also ==
- Education in Malaysia
- Distance education
- Lifelong learning
