= MAMPU =

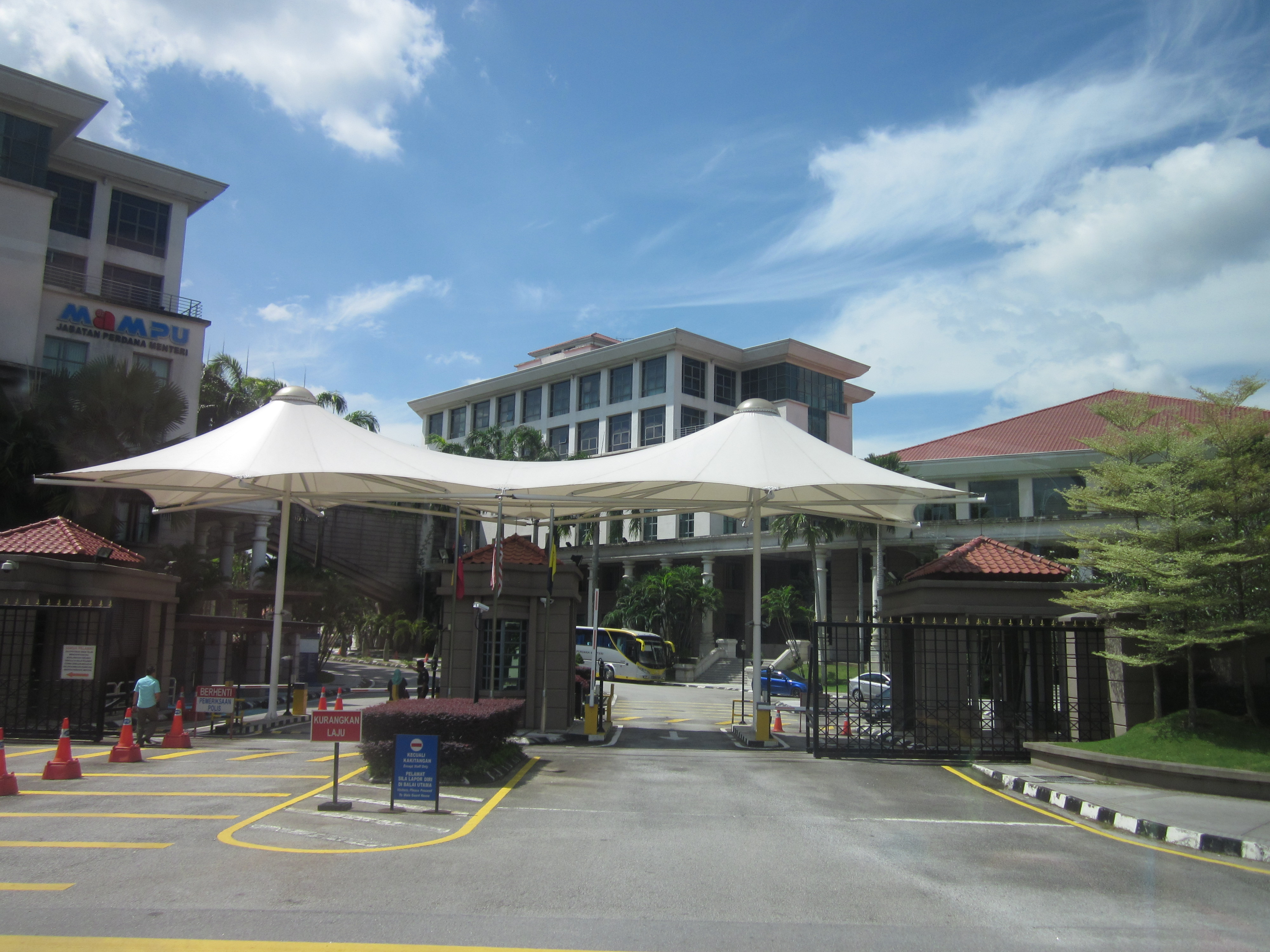
MAMPU office in 2017

The Malaysian Administrative Modernisation and Management Planning Unit (MAMPU; Malay: Unit Pemodenan Tadbiran dan Perancangan Pengurusan Malaysia) is one of the prominent government agencies in Malaysia, that is responsible for 'modernising and reforming' the public sector.

== Overview ==
Malaysian Administrative Modernisation and Management Planning Unit (MAMPU) is one of the few central agencies in Malaysia, responsible for ‘modernising and reformising’ the public sector in the areas of administrative reforms. MAMPU is placed under the Prime Minister Department. Essentially, MAMPU was established in 1977 as an agency that is given the tasks to reform and modernise public administration in the public sector (Jeong, 2012).

Among the main objectives and functions of MAMPU are:

- To conduct research in public administration.
- To conduct research in the area of human resources.
- To formulate policy for the modernisation of the public sector.
- To report to the cabinet and/or parliament.

Other related objectives and functions of MAMPU are:

- To strengthen the administrative structure and human resources planning at the Federal, state, and local government levels.
- To upgrade and modernise the administrative system and its operation, through the study of the system and its operation, especially in accelerating the implementation of development.
- Introduce new and innovative techniques in the government administrative sectors, and improve on the efficiency material management system, resources, and programs, at all governmental levels.
- Introduce a more effective system in human resources planning and development, so as to correctly predict the current and future demands and needs of labour (human resources) for economic development.
- Control and co-ordinate purchases and usage of equipment, by various government agencies.

In general, MAMPU is divided into six (6) divisions:

- Task System Division
- Productivity Enhancement Division
- Finance Management Division
- Information Technology Division
- Task force and Administrative Division
- Management Policy Analysis and Organisation Research Division

In conclusion, the fundamental functions of MAMPU in general is to assist the various governmental organisations at the Federal, State, and Local government levels, on matters pertaining to modernisation and reformation of the public sector and public administration, especially that of administrative reforms. Thus, MAMPU can be regarded as the highest authority in setting the standard and policy for developing, modernising and reforming public administration (Jeong, 2012).

Essentially, paramount is the e-Government project, which has been one of the more notable project (flagship) under MAMPU, which concurrently worked together with MDeC and Accenture, in their efforts to help modernised the public sector. The e-Government flagship was launched in 1996, by the then Prime Minister of Malaysia, Mahathir Mohamad (1981–2003).

== Images ==
Logo for MAMPU with tagline in Bahasa Melayu

Logo for MAMPU with tagline in English
