= National Anti-Drugs Agency =

National Anti-Drugs Agency Agensi Antidadah Kebangsaan
- Logo of the National Anti-Drugs Agency
- Abbreviation: AADK, NADA

Agency overview
- Formed: 17 February 1996; 30 years ago

Jurisdictional structure
- Operations jurisdiction: Malaysia

Operational structure
- Headquarters: Jalan Maktab Perguruan Islam, 43000 Kajang, Selangor.
- Elected officer responsible: Saifuddin Nasution Ismail, Minister of Home Affairs
- Agency executive: Ruslin Jusoh, Director General
- Parent agency: Ministry of Home Affairs

Facilities
- PUSPENs: 30

Website
- www.aadk.gov.my

The National Anti-Drugs Agency (Malay: Agensi Antidadah Kebangsaan; abbreviated as NADA or AADK) is a Malaysian government agency tasked with combatting drugs and substance abuse in Malaysia. The agency also operates drugs rehabilitation centres throughout the country.

== Management ==
The NADA is a section of the Ministry of Home Affairs.

While NADA often collaborates with other law enforcement agencies, it is fully capable of operating independently, akin to the U.S. Drug Enforcement Administration.

== Organisation ==
=== Special Tactical Response and Investigation Key Enforcers ===
The Special Tactical Response and Investigation Key Enforcers (STRIKE) is an elite firearms unit within the AADK.

Established on 18 October 2016, STRIKE is tasked with executing high-risk raids, investigations, and arrests targeting drug-related offences, particularly those involving major trafficking networks and high-value targets.

Their primary mission is to dismantle drug syndicates and curb the spread of illegal substances throughout Malaysia.
