= Wan Ahmad Dahlan Abdul Aziz =

Malaysian civil servant

Yang Berbahagia Tan Sri Wan Ahmad Dahlan Abdul Aziz PSM PSD SPMS SPMP SPSK SSAP DPSK DIMP PMW

27th Director-General of Public Service
- In office 9 January 2024 – 20 November 2026
- Monarchs: Abdullah (9–30 January 2024); Ibrahim Iskandar (2024-2026)
- Prime Minister: Anwar Ibrahim
- Preceded by: Zulkapli Mohamed

Director-General of the Implementation Coordination Unit
- In office 20 February 2023 – 9 January 2024
- Monarch: Abdullah
- Prime Minister: Anwar Ibrahim
- Preceded by: Ruji Ubi

Secretary-General of the Ministry of Home Affairs
- In office 15 July 2020 – 20 February 2023
- Monarch: Abdullah
- Prime Minister: Muhyiddin Yassin (2020–2021); Ismail Sabri Yaakob (2021–2022); Anwar Ibrahim (2022–2023)
- Minister: Hamzah Zainuddin (2020–2022); Saifuddin Nasution Ismail (2022–2023)
- Preceded by: Jamil Rakon
- Succeeded by: Ruji Ubi

Personal details
- Born: Wan Ahmad Dahlan bin Abdul Aziz; 20 November 1966 (age 60) Kelantan, Malaysia
- Education: Airlangga University (Bachelor of Arts in Communication (Honours)); University of Malaya (Master's degree in Strategic and Defence Studies)
- Occupation: Civil servant

Yang Berbahagia Tan Sri Wan Ahmad Dahlan bin Abdul Aziz (born 20 November 1966) is a Malaysian civil servant who served as the 27th Director-General of Public Service from January 2024 to November 2026. He served as the Director-General of Implementation Coordination Unit (ICU) from February 2023 to January 2024, Secretary-General of the Ministry of Home Affairs from July 2020 to February 2023 and Comptroller of the Istana Negara Royal Household from December 2016 to February 2019.

== Civil career ==
Wan Ahmad Dahlan has been in the civil service since 1995. On 3 November 2014, Wan Ahmad Dahlan served as Director of Management Services Division under Public Service Department. On 14 December 2016, Wan Ahmad Dahlan served as comptroller of the Istana Negara Royal Household. On 1 February 2019, he served as Deputy Secretary-General (Policy and Control) of the Ministry of Home Affairs. On 15 July 2020, he served as Secretary-General of the Ministry of Home Affairs. On 20 February 2023, he served as Director-General of the Implementation Coordination Unit.

On 9 January 2024, he replaced Zulkapli Mohamed, became new Director-General of Public Service. As the Director-General of Public Service, Wan Ahmad Dahlan pledged to give his attention to the Public Service Renumeration System (SSPA) and Cross Placement Programme to ensure their immediate and effective implementation. Besides, Wan Ahmad Dahlan also made the digital aspect and the competitiveness of civil servants his priorities in line with the Fourth Industrial Revolution (Industry 4.0) and artificial intelligence so that the civil servants can adapt themselves to the digital revolution. On 19 January 2024, the Interim Report 1 on the Review of the SSPA was submitted to Prime Minister Anwar Ibrahim by Wan Ahmad Dahlan and Chief Secretary to the Government Mohd Zuki Ali after the SSPA Review main committee meeting chaired by Anwar.

== Honours ==
- Malaysia
  - Commander of the Order of Loyalty to the Crown of Malaysia (PSM) – Tan Sri (2024)
  - Commander of the Order of Loyalty to the Royal Family of Malaysia (PSD) – Datuk (2019)
- Federal Territory (Malaysia)
  - Commander of the Order of the Territorial Crown (PMW) – Datuk (2019)
- Kelantan
  - Knight Grand Commander of the Order of Loyalty to the Crown of Kelantan (SPSK) – Dato' (2018)
  - Knight Commander of the Order of Loyalty to the Crown of Kelantan (DPSK) – Dato' (2016)
- Pahang
  - Knight Grand Companion of the Order of Sultan Ahmad Shah of Pahang (SSAP) – Dato' Sri (2021)
  - Knight Companion of the Order of the Crown of Pahang (DIMP) – Dato' (2011)
- Perlis
  - Knight Grand Commander of the Order of the Crown of Perlis (SPMP) – Dato' Seri (2026)
- Selangor
  - Knight Grand Commander of the Order of the Crown of Selangor (SPMS) – Dato' Seri (2024)
