= Ayub Yaakob =

Retired Malaysian police officer

Dato’ Wira Ayub bin Yaakob (born 23 August 1954 (age 70)) is the former director of Bukit Aman Crime Prevention and Community Safety Department of the Royal Malaysia Police.

== Early life ==
Ayub Yaakob was born on 23 August 1954 in Batang Kali, Selangor.

== Police career ==
Ayub Yaakob joined the Royal Malaysia Police on 1 October 1977 as an Inspector. During his career, he held various posts including Training Officer of Royal Malaysia Police, Development Officer of the Ministry of Home Affairs, Principal Assistant Director of Logistic Development, Deputy Head of Negeri Sembilan Criminal Investigation Department, Escort to SPB YDP Agong, Commandant of PULAPOL Kuala Lumpur, Malacca Police Chief, Terengganu Police Chief, Penang Police Chief and director of Bukit Aman Crime Prevention and Community Safety Department. He contributed to the force for 37 years and was retired in 2014.

== Post career ==
Ayub Yaakob is currently one of the Board of Trustee for Yayasan Pengaman Malaysia.

== Honours ==
- Malaysia :
  - Officer of the Order of the Defender of the Realm (KMN) (1998)
  - Companion of the Order of Loyalty to the Royal Family of Malaysia (JSD) (2003)
- Selangor :
  - Companion of the Order of the Crown of Selangor (SMS) (2002)
- Malacca :
  - Companion Class I of the Exalted Order of Malacca (DMSM) – Datuk (2006)
- Perlis :
  - Grand Hero of the Order of Prince Syed Sirajuddin Jamalullail of Perlis (DWSJ) – Dato' Wira (2008)
- Penang :
  - Companion of the Order of the Defender of State (DMPN) – Dato' (2009)
- Royal Malaysia Police :
  - Courageous Commander of the Most Gallant Police Order (PGPP) (2013)
