= David Wong Dak Wah =

Malaysian lawyer and judge

Yang Berbahagia Tan Sri Datuk Seri Panglima David Wong Dak Wah PSM SPDK PGDK
- 黄达华

5th Chief Judge of Sabah and Sarawak
- In office 11 July 2018 – 19 February 2020
- Nominated by: Mahathir Mohamad
- Appointed by: Muhammad V
- Preceded by: Richard Malanjum
- Succeeded by: Abang Iskandar Abang Hashim

Personal details
- Born: David Wong Dak Wah; 20 August 1953 (age 73) Sandakan, Crown Colony of North Borneo (now Sabah, Malaysia)
- Citizenship: Malaysian
- Spouse: Janet Wong Ying Kin
- Education: University of New South Wales
- Occupation: Judge
- Profession: Lawyer

David Wong Dak Wah

Chinese name
- Traditional Chinese: 黃達華
- Simplified Chinese: 黄达华
- Hanyu Pinyin: Huáng Dáhuá
- Pha̍k-fa-sṳ: Vòng Tha̍t-fà
- Jyutping: Wong4 Daat6 Waa4
- Hokkien POJ: N̂g Ta̍t-hôa
- Tâi-lô: N̂g Ta̍t-huâ

Tan Sri Datuk Seri Panglima David Wong Dak Wah (simplified Chinese: 黄达华; traditional Chinese: 黃達華; pinyin: Huáng Dáhuá; Jyutping: Wong4 Daat6 Waa4; Pe̍h-ōe-jī: N̂g Ta̍t-hôa; Pha̍k-fa-sṳ: Vòng Tha̍t-fà; born 20 August 1953) is a Malaysian lawyer and judge who served as the fifth Chief Judge of Sabah and Sarawak.

== Education ==
Wong attended the University of New South Wales in Sydney, Australia. He graduated with a Bachelor of Commerce (BCom.), majoring in accountancy, in 1976 and a Bachelor of Laws (LL.B.) in 1977.

== Career ==
On 29 September 2005, Wong was appointed as judicial commissioner at the High Court in Kuching. He was promoted to the post of judge at the same court on 11 April 2007.

On 15 January 2009, he was transferred to the High Court in Kota Kinabalu.

On 8 January 2013, he was appointed as a judge at the Court of Appeal of Malaysia, second highest court in the judicial hierarchy of Malaysia. He held this position until 27 April 2018. He was then appointed a judge at the Federal Court of Malaysia, ascending to the apex court in the country. Less than two months later, Wong was sworn in by the Yang di-Pertuan Agong (King of Malaysia) to the office of Chief Judge of The High Court of Sabah and Sarawak (CJSS), replacing Richard Malanjum who was elevated to the post of Chief Justice of Malaysia. As such, he now occupies the fourth highest judicial office in the country after the Chief Justice of Malaysia (CJ), President of the Court of Appeal of Malaysia (PCA) and Chief Judge of The High Court of Malaya (CJM).

On 19 February 2020, Wong officially retired as CJSS having reached the mandatory retirement age.

== Honours ==
- Malaysia
  - Commander of the Order of Loyalty to the Crown of Malaysia (PSM) - Tan Sri (2019)
- Sabah
  - Commander of the Order of Kinabalu (PGDK) - Datuk (2009)
  - Grand Commander of the Order of Kinabalu (SPDK) - Datuk Seri Panglima (2018)

Legal offices
Preceded by Richard Malanjum	Chief Judge of Sabah and Sarawak; 2018–2020	Succeeded by Abang Iskandar Abang Hashim
