= Azahar Mohamed =

Malaysian judge and lawyer

Yang Amat Arif Tan Sri Dato' Sri Azahar Mohamed PSM SSAP DIMP KMN
- أزهار بين محمد

12th Chief Judge of Malaya
- In office 8 August 2019 – 27 October 2022
- Nominated by: Mahathir Mohamad
- Appointed by: Abdullah
- Preceded by: Zaharah Ibrahim
- Succeeded by: Mohamad Zabidin Mohd Diah (Acting)

Personal details
- Born: Azahar bin Mohamed; 27 April 1956 (age 70) Johor Bahru, Johor, Federation of Malaya (now Malaysia)
- Citizenship: Malaysian
- Spouse: Aminah Md. Yusof
- Education: University of Malaya (LL.B.); London School of Economics (LL.M.)
- Occupation: Judge
- Profession: Lawyer

Azahar bin Mohamed (Jawi: أزهار بين محمد; born 27 April 1956) is a retired Malaysian judge and lawyer who served as the 12th Chief Judge of the High Court of Malaya from August 2019 to his retirement in October 2022.

== Early life and education ==
Azahar was born in the capital of the southern Malaysian state of Johor, Johor Bahru. He graduated from the University of Malaya with a Bachelor of Laws (LL.B.) in 1980 before furthering his studies to the London School of Economics and obtained a Master of Laws (LL.M.) in 1987.

== Career ==
=== 1980s ===
Azahar began his career in civil service as a senior assistant registrar at the High Court in Johor Bahru on 2 April 1980. Within two years, he was appointed as a magistrate at the magistrates court of Johor Bahru. On 15 September 1983, he was appointed as deputy public prosecutor (DPP) in Peninsular Malaysia's largest state, Pahang.

Upon returning from his studies in the United Kingdom, Azahar resumed his duties as DPP beginning 15 September 1987 but now attached to the state of Negeri Sembilan. By 19 December 1988, he was made a judge of the sessions court in the national capital city of Kuala Lumpur.

=== 1990s ===
On 1 June 1990, Azahar was transferred to the state of Kelantan to begin his tenure as DPP once more. Between 1 March 1991 and 15 February 1992, he acted as DPP for the Anti-Corruption Agency (ACA) based in Kuala Lumpur. Immediately after, Azahar was posted to the Royal Malaysian Customs Department as senior federal counsel. By the end of 1992, he was transferred to the Ministry of Domestic Trade and Consumer Affairs of Malaysia as deputy registrar of companies.

Beginning April 1994, Azahar was attached to the Attorney General's Chambers as DPP once more. After two years, he was made deputy head of the Attorney General's Chambers' prosecution division in May 1996 before being promoted to its head in June 1997.

=== 2000s ===
Having served in the Attorney General's Chambers since 1994, Azahar was appointed as the head of its civil division on 1 February 2000. He served in this capacity for more than four years before being made a judicial commissioner at the High Court in Johor Bahru in August 2004, incidentally, this is where he had begun his civil service back in 1980. On 27 July 2006, Azahar was appointed as a judge of the High Court in Johor Bahru.

Azahar officially began duties as a judge of the High Court of Kuala Lumpur on 1 January 2009. He was attached to the trade division. Later that year, he was re-designated to the intellectual properties subdivision of the high court.

=== 2010s ===
After serving as a judge of the High Court for almost five years, Azahar was elevated as a judge of the Court of Appeal of Malaysia on 11 May 2011. He served in the appellate court for a little more than three years before being promoted to the highest and final appellate court of Malaysia on 12 September 2014, as a judge of the Federal Court of Malaysia. On 8 August 2019, after nearly half a decade of service in the Federal Court, Azahar ascended to the office of Chief Judge of Malaya, the third highest judicial post of Malaysia after the Chief Justice of Malaysia and the President of the Court of Appeal of Malaysia. He becomes the twelfth occupant of the office, succeeding Zaharah Ibrahim who retired in May 2019. Since then, Azahar had already been serving as acting Chief Judge whilst awaiting the judicial appointments committee and the Prime Minister of Malaysia to nominate a permanent successor to Zaharah.

=== 2020s ===
On 27 October 2022, he retired as the Chief Judge of Malaya. On 9 November 2022, Federal Court judge Mohamad Zabidin Mohd Diah was appointed as the acting replacement with immediate effect. Director of the Corporate Communications Division of Office of the Chief Registrar of Federal Court Suzarika Sahak confirmed the appointment.

== Honours ==
- Malaysia
  - Commander of the Order of Loyalty to the Crown of Malaysia (PSM) – Tan Sri (2016)
  - Officer of the Order of the Defender of the Realm (KMN) (1996)
- Pahang
  - Knight Grand Companion of the Order of Sultan Ahmad Shah of Pahang (SSAP) – Dato' Sri (2018)
  - Knight Companion of the Order of the Crown of Pahang (DIMP) – Dato' (1999)

Preceded by Zaharah Ibrahim	Chief Judge of Malaya; 2019-present	Incumbent
