= Zaharah Ibrahim =

Malaysian judge and lawyer

Yang Amat Arif Tan Sri Datin Paduka Zaharah Ibrahim PSM DPMS PJN KMN SMS

11th Chief Judge of Malaya
- In office 11 July 2018 – 16 May 2019
- Nominated by: Mahathir Mohamad
- Appointed by: Muhammad V
- Preceded by: Ahmad Maarop
- Succeeded by: Azahar Mohamed

Chairperson of Prasarana Malaysia
- In office 11 November 2019 – 12 May 2020
- Minister: Lim Guan Eng; Tengku Zafrul Aziz
- Preceded by: Khalid Abu Bakar
- Succeeded by: Tajuddin Abdul Rahman

Personal details
- Born: Zaharah binti Ibrahim; 17 November 1952 (age 73) Johor Bahru, Johor, Federation of Malaya (now Malaysia)
- Citizenship: Malaysian
- Spouse: Mohd Arsad Sehan
- Education: University of Malaya
- Occupation: Business executive
- Profession: Lawyer

Zaharah binti Ibrahim was the eleventh Chief Judge of Malaya. She also served as chairperson of Prasarana Malaysia Berhad (Malaysian Infrastructure Limited).

== Education ==
Zaharah had her early education at Bandar Pontian National School and secondary education at the premier all-girl boarding school Tun Fatimah School (STF). She then graduated from University of Malaya in Kuala Lumpur, Malaysia with a Bachelor of Laws (Honours) (LL.B.) in 1977.

== Career ==
Zaharah Ibrahim began her career in the legal field on 26 April 1977 as a law officer. She was later appointed into the Judicial and Legal Service and held the post of Magistrate at Alor Gajah, Jasin, and Merlimau, all in Malacca.

Between 1981 and 2004 she assumed various positions in the Attorney General's Chambers of Malaysia and the Ministry of Domestic Trade and Consumer Affairs. Her last position in the service was as the Parliamentary Draftsman between 1996 and 2004.

On 1 August 2004, she was appointed as a Judicial Commissioner of the High Court of Malaya and served in the Kuala Lumpur and Shah Alam High Court. On July 28, 2006, she was confirmed as a High Court Judge.

On 14 April 2010, she was elevated as Court of Appeal judge.

On 16 February 2015, she was appointed as Federal Court judge.

On 11 July 2018, she was appointed to the post of Chief Judge of The High Court of Malaya by the Yang di-Pertuan Agong. She replaced Ahmad Maarop who was promoted as President of the Court of Appeal of Malaysia. However, she was only sworn-in at the Palace of Justice when she returned to Malaysia on 17 July 2018, hence becoming only the second woman to assume the third highest judicial office of the country.

On 11 November 2019, she was appointed as chairperson of Prasarana Malaysia Berhad (Malaysian Infrastructure Limited). She succeeds former Inspector-General of Police (IGP), Khalid Abu Bakar, who resigned from office following the defeat of the National Front (BN) in the 14th Malaysian general election. In mid-May 2020, Ibrahim was replaced by Tajuddin Abdul Rahman, United Malays National Organisation's (UMNO's) Member of Parliament (MP) for Pasir Salak, following the 2020 Malaysian constitutional crisis which saw the Pakatan Harapan (PH) governing coalition being ousted from power.

== Honours ==
- Malaysia
  - Commander of the Order of Loyalty to the Crown of Malaysia (PSM) – Tan Sri (2016)
  - Commander of the Order of Meritorious Service (PJN) – Datuk (2004)
  - Officer of the Order of the Defender of the Realm (KMN) (1992)
- Selangor
  - Knight Commander of the Order of the Crown of Selangor (DPMS) – Datin Paduka (1997)
  - Companion of the Order of the Crown of Selangor (SMS) (1996)

Legal offices
Preceded by Ahmad Maarop	Chief Judge of Malaya; 2018–2019	Succeeded by Azahar Mohamed
Government offices
Preceded by Khalid Abu Bakar	Chairperson of Prasarana Malaysia Berhad; 2019–2020	Succeeded by Tajuddin Abdul Rahman
