= Ahmad Maarop =

Malaysian judge and lawyer

Yang Berbahagia Tan Sri Dato' Sri Ahmad Maarop PSM SSAP DCSM DSMZ SMP KMN

10th President of the Court of Appeal of Malaysia
- In office 11 July 2018 – 24 November 2019
- Nominated by: Mahathir Mohamad
- Appointed by: Muhammad V
- Preceded by: Zulkefli Ahmad Makinudin
- Succeeded by: Rohana Yusuf

10th Chief Judge of Malaya
- In office 4 April 2017 – 11 July 2018
- Preceded by: Zulkefli Ahmad Makinudin
- Succeeded by: Zaharah Ibrahim

Personal details
- Born: Ahmad bin Haji Maarop; 25 May 1953 (age 73) Kampung Serkam, Malacca, Federation of Malaya (now Malaysia)
- Citizenship: Malaysian
- Spouse: Zainon Zainuddin
- Children: 3
- Education: University of Malaya

Ahmad bin Maarop (born 25 May 1953) is a Malaysian jurist and lawyer who served as the tenth President of the Court of Appeal of Malaysia (PCA).

== Early life and education ==
Maarop was born in Kampung Serkam, a village in the historical state of Malacca. He underwent his primary school education at Jasin National Primary School, Alor Gajah National Primary School and finally Bukit Beruang National Primary School, all in his home state. Maarop then attended the Dato' Abdul Razak School, a premier boarding school in Sungai Gadut, Seremban, Negeri Sembilan. Upon completion of high school, he read law at the University of Malaya and obtained Bachelor of Laws (Honours) (LL.B. (Hons.)) in 1978.

== Career ==
He started his legal career as a Judicial and Legal Service officer on 8 May 1978 and had since held various post, serving as Magistrate in Betong and Temerloh, Deputy Public Prosecutor (DPP) for the state of Johor, DPP of Royal Malaysian Customs Department, State Legal Advisor of Perlis, Head of Prosecution Unit for Penang, Senior Federal Counsel of Ministry of Home Affairs of Malaysia and State Legal Advisor of Kelantan. In 1994, while serving as State Legal Advisor of Kelantan, he was admitted as advocate and solicitor in the High Court in Malaya at Kota Bharu. He was then transferred to the Attorney General's Chambers headquarters where he served as deputy director and later as Head of Division, Advisory and International Division of Attorney General's Chambers. On 1 October 1998, he became one of the seven persons who were appointed as Senior Deputy Public Prosecutor by the Attorney General of Malaysia. His last position in Judicial and Legal Service was Commissioner Law Revision and Reform Malaysia.

On 1 June 2000, he was elevated to the High Court bench as judicial commissioner and was assigned to preside over High Court in Malaya in Malacca. On 1 March 2002, he was appointed as a High Court Judge and served in the High Court in Malaya in Malacca, Kuala Lumpur and Terengganu. His elevation to the Court of Appeal bench took place on 18 July 2007. On 10 August 2011, he took his appointment as Judge, Federal Court of Malaysia.

On 1 April 2017, he was officially appointed as Chief Judge of Malaya, taking over from Zulkefli Ahmad Makinudin to occupy the third highest judicial office in Malaysia.

Following the 14th Malaysian general election and the resignation of Zulkefli, Maarop was again chosen to take over from Zulkefli, this time ascending to the second highest judicial office of Malaysia, becoming the president of the Court of Appeal of Malaysia. He was sworn in by the Yang di-Pertuan Agong (King of Malaysia) on 11 July 2018. As such, Maarop is currently the second-highest judicial officer in Malaysia after the Chief Justice of Malaysia.

Maarop retired as PCA on the 24 November 2019 having reached the mandatory retirement age as stipulated by the Constitution of Malaysia.

== Honours ==
- Malaysia
  - Commander of the Order of Loyalty to the Crown of Malaysia (PSM) – Tan Sri (2013)
  - Officer of the Order of the Defender of the Realm (KMN) (1997)
- Malacca
  - Knight Commander of the Exalted Order of Malacca (DCSM) – Datuk Wira (2015)
  - Companion Class I of the Exalted Order of Malacca (DMSM) – Datuk (1998)
- Pahang
  - Knight Grand Companion of the Order of Sultan Ahmad Shah of Pahang (SSAP) – Dato' Sri (2017)
  - Companion of the Order of the Crown of Pahang (SMP) (1990)
- Terengganu
  - Knight Companion of the Order of Sultan Mizan Zainal Abidin of Terengganu (DSMZ) – Dato' (2006)

Legal offices
Preceded by Zulkefli Ahmad Makinudin	President of the Court of Appeal of Malaysia; 2018–2019	Succeeded by Rohana Yusuf
Preceded by Zulkefli Ahmad Makinudin	Chief Judge of Malaya; 2017–2018	Succeeded by Zaharah Ibrahim
