= Rohana Yusuf =

Malaysian lawyer and judge

Yang Berbahagia Tan Sri Dato' Rohana Yusuf PSM SPSK DPSK
- روحانا بنت يوسف

11th President of the Court of Appeal of Malaysia
- In office 5 December 2019 – November 2022
- Nominated by: Mahathir Mohamad
- Appointed by: Abdullah
- Preceded by: Ahmad Maarop
- Succeeded by: Abang Iskandar Abang Hashim

Personal details
- Born: Rohana binti Yusuf; 9 May 1956 (age 70) Bachok District, Kelantan, Federation of Malaya (now Malaysia)
- Citizenship: Malaysian
- Education: University of Malaya; International Islamic University Malaysia
- Occupation: Judge
- Profession: Lawyer

Rohana binti Yusuf (Jawi: روحانا بنت يوسف; born 9 May 1956) is the eleventh President of the Court of Appeal of Malaysia (PCA). She is the first woman to have been appointed into the office since its inception in 1994.

== Early life and education ==
Rohana was born in Bachok District, Kelantan on 9 May 1956.

Rohana graduated from the University of Malaya with a Bachelor of Laws (LL.B.) degree in 1980. She later obtained a Diploma in Syariah Law and Legal Practice (DSLP) and Master of Comparative Laws (MCL) from the International Islamic University Malaysia (IIUM) in 1992 and 1993 respectively.

== Career ==
Rohana's career in the Legal and Judicial Services began in 1980 when she became an Assistant Parliamentary Draftsman at the Drafting Division of the Attorney General’s Chambers. In 1982, she was appointed as Legal Adviser at the Ministry of Defence of Malaysia. She would serve in this capacity for around four years before being made Senior Federal Counsel at the Attorney General’s Chambers in 1986.

Subsequently, Rohana served as a Sessions Court judge at Kuala Lumpur. After serving 18 years in the Legal and Judicial Services, Rohana opted to retire from the service. Post-retirement in 1997, she joined the private sector as Legal Adviser and Company Secretary at Kumpulan UCM Industrial Corporation Berhad (UCM Group Industrial Corporation Limited) and at International Bank Malaysia Berhad (International Bank Malaysia Limited). In 2000, Yusuf practised as an advocate and solicitor and was a partner of Messrs. GH Tee & Co. Immediately prior to joining the judiciary, she was deputy director of Islamic Banking and Takaful Department, Central Bank of Malaysia between 2001 and 2005.

Rohana's career in the judiciary began when she was appointed as a judicial commissioner of the High Court of Malaya at Kuala Lumpur on 1 September 2005. She was promoted to a full judge attached at the same court on 17 April 2007.

On 8 January 2013, Rohana was promoted as a judge of the Court of Appeal of Malaysia, the second highest court in Malaysia.

Having served in the Court of Appeal for more than five years, Rohana, on 27 April 2018, was appointed as a judge of the Federal Court of Malaysia, the apex court in the country. Following Ahmad Maarop's mandatory retirement, Rohana was designated by the CJ, Tengku Maimun Tuan Mat, on 25 November 2019 to exercise the powers and perform the duties of the PCA.

On 5 December 2019, Rohana was sworn-in as Ahmad Maarop's successor as PCA following the latter's mandatory retirement in November and received her instrument of appointment from the Yang di-Pertuan Agong (King of Malaysia). As such, Rohana became the second highest judicial officer in Malaysia after the Chief Justice of Malaysia (CJ). With Tengku Maimun Tuan Mat becoming the Chief Justice earlier in 2019, Rohana's appointment meant that for the first time both of the top judicial posts in Malaysia were held by women.

Rohana retired as PCA on the November 2022 having reached the mandatory retirement age as stipulated by the Constitution of Malaysia.

== Honours ==
- Malaysia
  - Commander of the Order of Loyalty to the Crown of Malaysia (PSM) – Tan Sri (2020)
- Kelantan
  - Knight Grand Commander of the Order of the Loyalty to the Crown of Kelantan (SPSK) – Dato' (2016)
  - Knight Commander of the Order of the Loyalty to the Crown of Kelantan (DPSK) – Dato' (2007)

Legal offices
Preceded by Ahmad Maarop	President of the Court of Appeal of Malaysia; 2019–present	Incumbent
