= Abang Iskandar Abang Hashim =

Malaysian jurist and lawyer

Yang Berbahagia Tan Sri Datuk Amar Abang Iskandar Abang Hashim PSM DA DSPN

12th President of the Court of Appeal of Malaysia
- In office 17 January 2023 – 3 July 2025
- Appointed by: Abdullah
- Preceded by: Rohana Yusuf
- Succeeded by: Zabariah Mohd Yusof (acting); Abu Bakar Jais

6th Chief Judge of Sabah and Sarawak
- In office 25 February 2020 – 17 January 2023
- Nominated by: Mahathir Mohamad
- Appointed by: Abdullah
- Preceded by: David Wong Dak Wah
- Succeeded by: Abdul Rahman Sebli

Personal details
- Born: Abang Iskandar bin Abang Hashim; 3 July 1959 (age 67) Sibu, Crown Colony of Sarawak (now Sarawak, Malaysia)
- Citizenship: Malaysian
- Spouse: Fadzillah Kamaruddin
- Education: Bachelor of Laws (LL.B.) University of Malaya
- Occupation: Jurist
- Profession: Lawyer
- Salary: RM360,000 per annum

Abang Iskandar bin Abang Hashim (Jawi: أبانغ إسكندر بن أبانغ هاشم; born 3 July 1959) is a Malaysian jurist and lawyer who served as the 12th President of the Court of Appeal from January 2023 until his retirement in July 2025. He was the first person from Sarawak to be appointed to the position. He previously served as the Chief Judge of Sabah and Sarawak (CJSS).

== Early life and education ==
Abang Hashim was born on 3 July 1959 in Sibu, Crown Colony of Sarawak (present-day Sarawak, Malaysia). He graduated from the University of Malaya with a Bachelor of Laws (LL.B.).

== Career ==
Abang Hashim's career in the Judicial and Legal Service began on 1 August 1983 when he was appointed as a magistrate in Miri, Sarawak. In the same year, he also served in the magistrates' court of Limbang before being transferred to the equivalent court in his hometown of Sibu in the 1984.

In 1989, Abang Hashim crossed to serve in the Sarawak Legal Aid Bureau. Nevertheless, he was to return to the judicial service the following year having been made a Sessions Court judge at the national capital of Kuala Lumpur.

In the following years between 1992 and 1994, Abang Hashim took the opportunity to join various government departments in his service including serving as the Legal Advisor of the Fisheries Department in the Malaysian Ministry of Agriculture. This was then followed with tenures in various divisions of the Attorney General's Chambers (AGC) concluding in 2000 at which time he had become head of the Commercial Crime Unit in the Prosecution Division based in Malaysia's administrative capital of Putrajaya. Upon leaving the AGC, Abang Hashim was then appointed as the chairman of the Department of Cooperative Development Malaysia Tribunal for a period of one year. This was quickly followed by a position as the Head of Prosecution Unit/Deputy Public Prosecutor (DPP) in the Central Bank of Malaysia. Two years later, Abang Hashim returned to the AGC and resumed his previous posting as the Head of the Commercial Crime Unit from the year 2003 until 2004. In 2004, he was seconded to the Securities Commission Malaysia (SC), Bukit Kiara as its Director of Enforcement Division until 2007.

On 1 March 2007, Abang Hashim was appointed as a judicial commissioner. In the same year, he was also appointed as the chairman of the Appeal Board, Board of Engineers Malaysia (BEM). As judicial commissioner, Abang Hashim served at the High Courts of Shah Alam, Selangor from 1 March 2007 until 31 April 2009 before being transferred to Kuala Lumpur High Court on 1 May 2009.

On 14 October 2009, Abang Hashim was confirmed as a full High Court judge and continued to serve in Kuala Lumpur until the end of 2012. He would then be transferred to serve in the High Court in Penang in 2013.

On 30 September 2013, Abang Hashim was elevated as a judge of the Court of Appeal of Malaysia.

On 26 November 2018, Abang Hashim was elevated to Malaysia's apex court and took office as a Federal Court judge.

As senior most judge from East Malaysia in the Federal Court, Abang Hashim was appointed as David Wong Dak Wah's successor in an acting capacity as CJSS on 20 February 2020. On 25 February 2020, he received the instrument of appointment from the Yang di-Pertuan Agong (King of Malaysia) at the Istana Negara (Malaysian National Palace) to permanently ascend to Malaysia's fourth highest judicial office.

He was later on appointed as the President of the Court of Appeal, first in an acting capacity upon the retirement of Rohana Yusuf in November 2022, then two months later his appointment became permanent as of now.

== Honours ==
=== Honours of Malaysia ===
- Malaysia
  - Commander of the Order of Loyalty to the Crown of Malaysia (PSM) – Tan Sri (2021)
- Penang
  - Officer of the Order of the Defender of State (DSPN) – Dato' (2013)
- Sarawak
  - Knight Commander of the Order of the Star of Hornbill Sarawak (DA) – Datuk Amar (2022)

Legal offices
Preceded by David Wong Dak Wah	Chief Judge of Sabah and Sarawak; 2020–2023	Succeeded by Abdul Rahman Sebli
