= Sultan Abdul Samad Building =

Historic building in Kuala Lumpur, Malaysia

Coordinates: 3°08′55″N 101°41′40″E

- Malay: Bangunan Sultan Abdul Samad
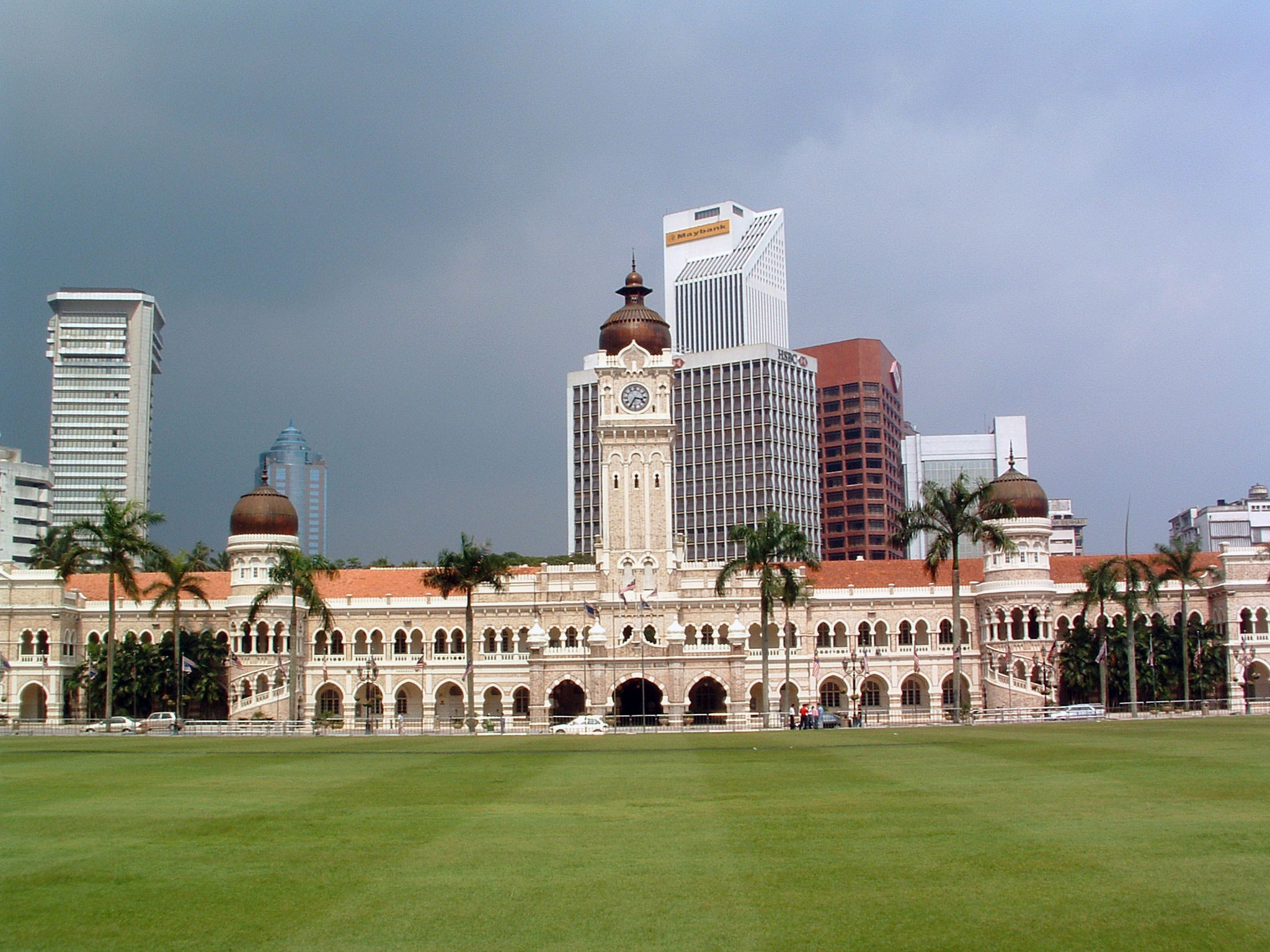
- Front view of the Sultan Abdul Samad Building
- Interactive map of the Sultan Abdul Samad Building area

General information
- Type: Government Office
- Architectural style: Indo-Saracenic, Neo-Mughal, or Moorish
- Location: Jalan Raja, Kuala Lumpur, Malaysia
- Construction started: 3 September 1894; 131 years ago
- Completed: 1897; 129 years ago
- Inaugurated: 4 April 1897; 129 years ago

Height
- Architectural: 40 m (130 ft)
- Antenna spire: 3 m (9.8 ft)
- Roof: 37 m (121 ft)

Design and construction
- Architects: A.C. Norman; R. A. J. Bidwell; A. B. Hubback

Other information
- Public transit: AG7 SP7 KJ13 Masjid Jamek LRT station (750m walk); KG16 KJ14 Pasar Seni LRT/MRT station (850m walk)

Website
- www.bsas.com.my

The Sultan Abdul Samad Building (Malay: Bangunan Sultan Abdul Samad; Jawi: باڠونن سلطان عبدالصمد) is a late-19th-century building located along Jalan Raja in front of Dataran Merdeka and the Royal Selangor Club in Kuala Lumpur, Malaysia. The building originally housed the offices of the British colonial administration, and was known simply as Government Offices in its early years. In 1974, it was renamed after Sultan Abdul Samad, the reigning sultan of Selangor at the time when construction began.

The building once housed the superior courts of the country: the Federal Court of Malaysia, the Court of Appeals and the High Court of Malaya; the Federal Court and the Court of Appeals relocated to the Palace of Justice in Putrajaya in 2003, while the High Court of Malaya shifted to the Kuala Lumpur Courts Complex in Segambut in 2007. Later, it housed the offices of the Ministry of Communications and Multimedia and the Ministry of Tourism and Culture of Malaysia.

The building was most recently restored in 2026, and contains galleries, exhibition spaces and several cafés.

== History ==
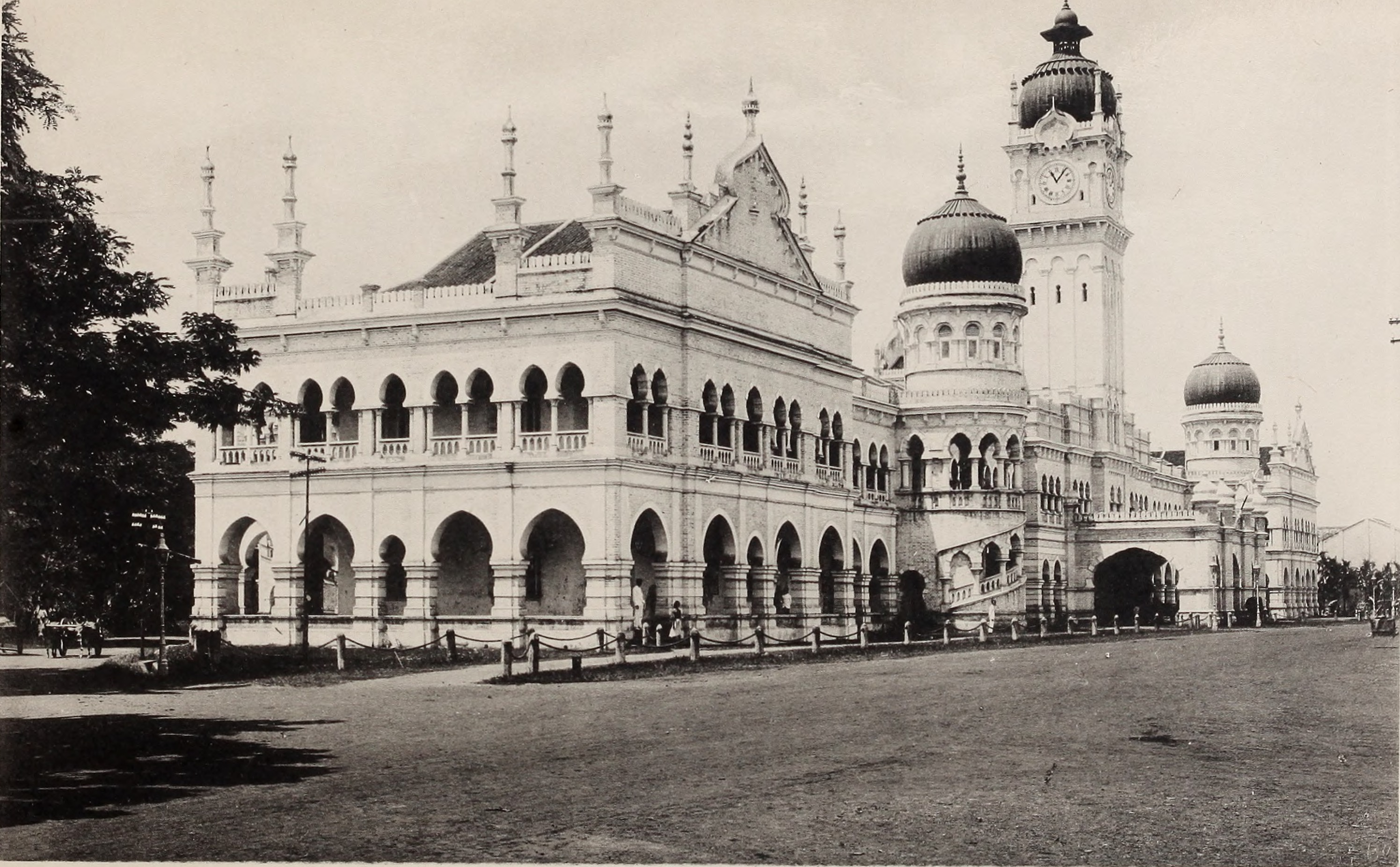
The building in 1902, then known simply as Government Offices

=== Origin and design ===
The government offices of the British colonial administration was originally located in the Bluff Road (present day Jalan Bukit Aman) area on a hill overlooking the Padang now called Merdeka Square. However, due to the need for more office space and complaints from the public about the necessity of going up and down the hill, the State Engineer of Selangor Public Works Department Charles Edwin Spooner proposed the building of government offices lower down on the plain near the river. The initial suggestion was rejected due to cost, but the British Resident of Selangor William Edward Maxwell accepted a second proposal that cost less.

The building was originally designed by A.C. Norman and his assistant R. A. J. Bidwell in a Classical Renaissance style, but Spooner disliked the design. It was then reworked by Bidwell under Spooner's guidance in a style variously described as Indo-Saracenic, Neo-Mughal, or Moorish. Later A. B. Hubback who had just starting working for the colonial government in Malaya as a senior draughtsman also worked on it. Although the building is formally credited to A.C. Norman (only his name appears on the foundation stone as the architect) and his ground plan was kept, the actual design is to a large extent the work of R. A. J. Bidwell, with some contributions from A. B. Hubback who also designed the fixtures of the building.

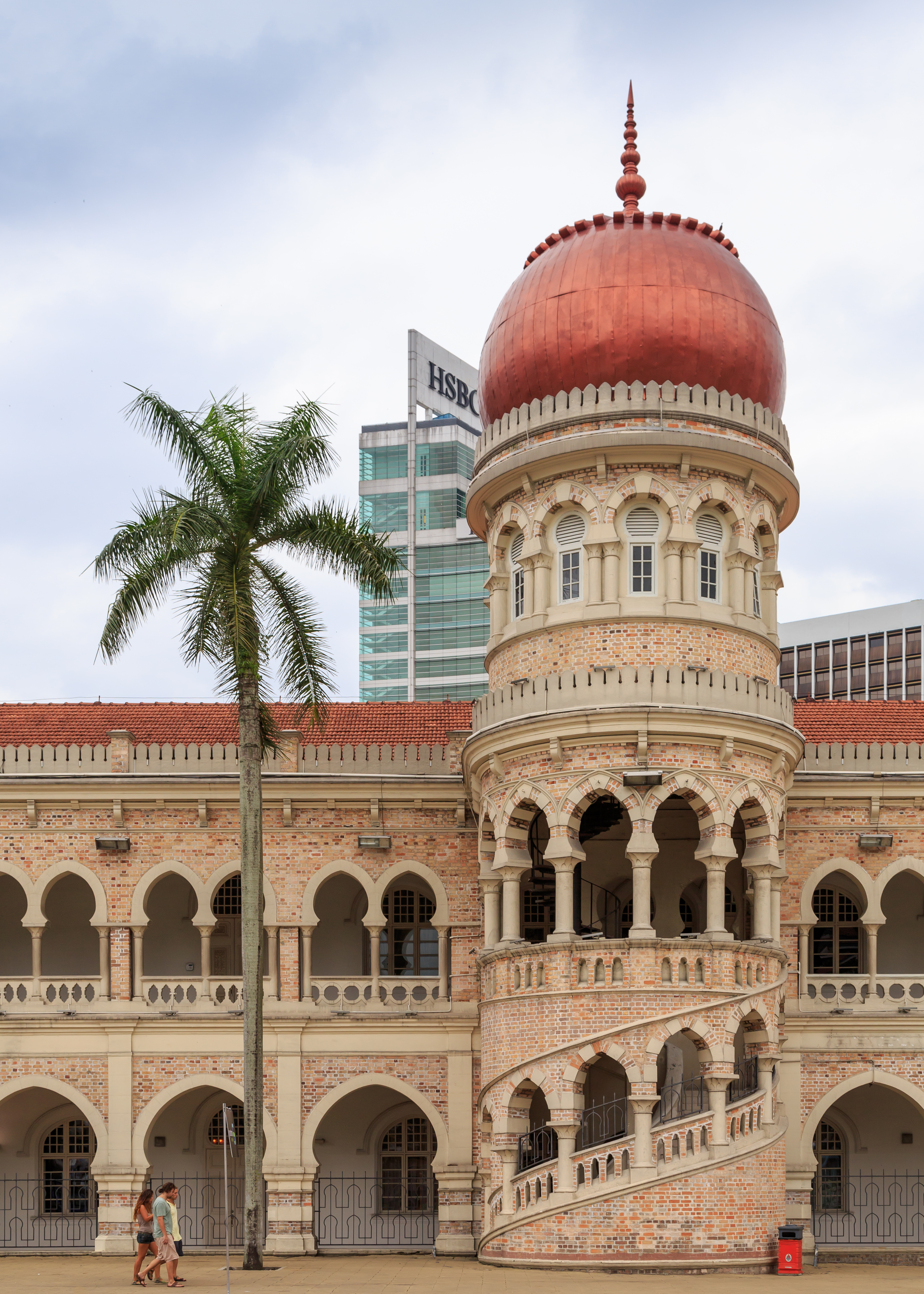
View of a tower of Sultan Abdul Samad Building

The building has two stories, with the floor plan roughly in the shape of the letter F with an extended top bar representing the frontage. The facade of the building faces the Padang and stretches over 137.2 metres (450 ft) along Jalan Raja, at that time the largest building in Malaya. The building has 3.5 metres (11 ft) wide verandas on both floors. A central clock tower is 41 metres (135 ft) in height, and designed to echo the Big Ben but in an Indo-Saracenic style. Two lower towers flanked the clock tower, each containing a staircase. The design of these two towers may have been influenced by Muir Central College of Allahabad in India. All three towers are topped by a copper-clad onion dome. The style of the building is sometimes referred to as the "blood and bandages" style—red bricks with white plastered banding and arches.

=== Construction ===
The construction of the building began in September 1894 and was completed in 1897. The foundation stone was laid on 6 October 1894 by the Governor of the Straits Settlements, Sir Charles Mitchell. The building sits on an area of 1.034 hectares, with the floor of the building occupying an area of 4,208.5 square metres (45,300 sq ft). The construction used 4 million bricks, 2,500 barrels of cement, 18,000 pikuls of lime, 5,000 lbs of copper, 50 tons of steel and iron, and about 30,000 cubic feet of timber. Spooner had previously established in the Brickfields area a factory for the production of large number of higher quality bricks, tiles and other building material suitable for the construction of the building. The cost of construction was 152,000 straits dollars.

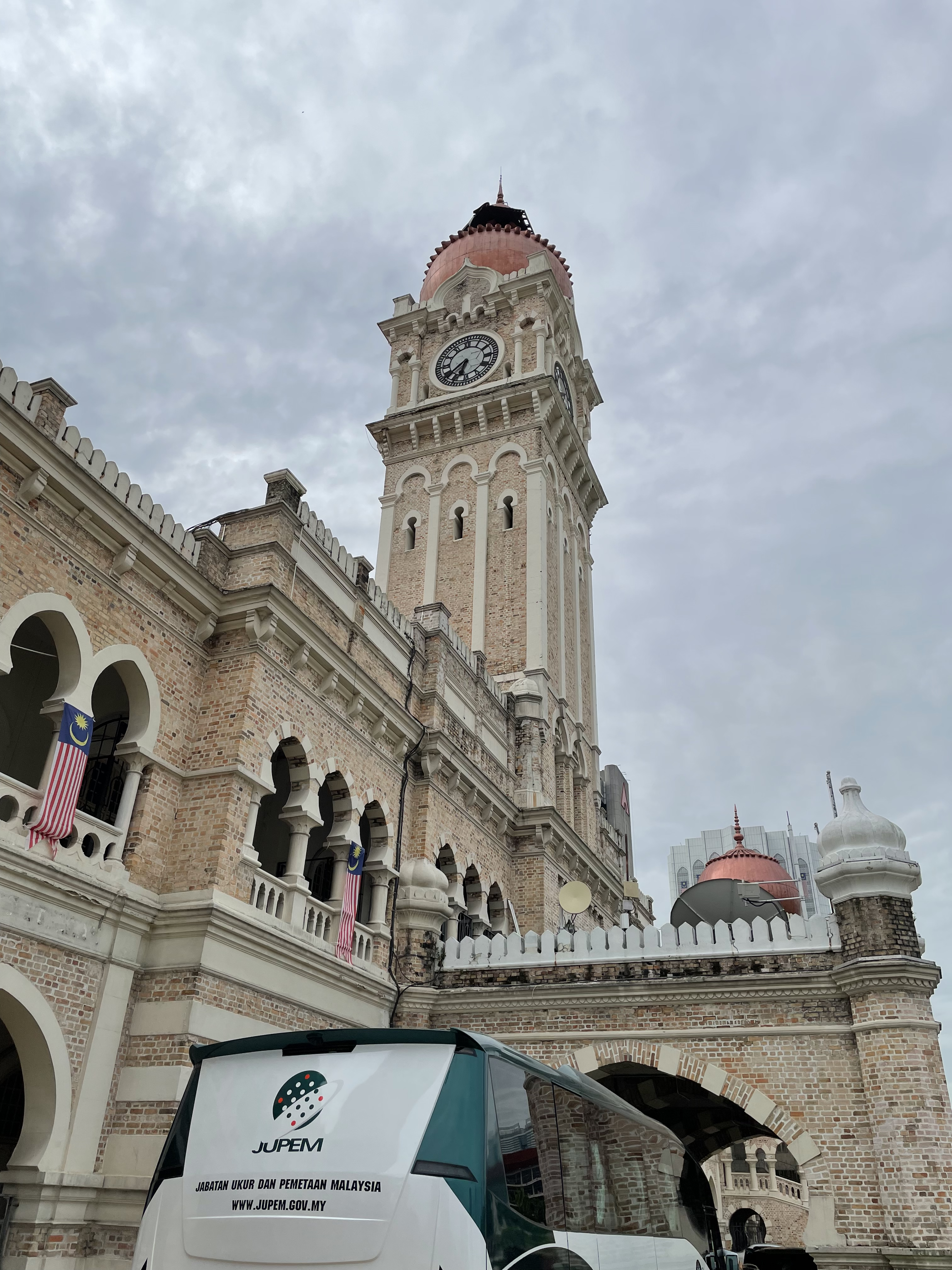
The clock tower of Sultan Abdul Samad Building - northern facade.

Spooner also made many alterations and additions while the building was being constructed with the help of A. B. Hubback. Some of these, such as an extra two and a half feet of brickwork on the lower walls, were necessary to strengthen the building due to it being built so close to the river. The height of the clock tower had also caused much concern to the public, who thought that the tower might collapse due to the ground vibrations caused by a loud signal gun fired daily at noon and 5 pm, but the built tower proved to be sturdy. A problem arose with the clock first delivered as it was not in harmony with the building, and it was replaced by a second one. The clock was manufactured by Gillett & Johnston of Croydon.

=== Opening ===
The building was completed in 1897, and a dinner was held by the Selangor Public Works Department in the building to celebrate its completion. On 4 April 1897, The building was officially opened by Sir Frank Swettenham, the General Resident of the time. A ball was held at the building, and its exterior was floodlit by gas burners, the first time such illumination was used in Kuala Lumpur.

The 41-metre (135 ft) tower chimed for the first time to coincide with Queen Victoria's Jubilee Parade in June 1897 and has chimed since.

=== Extensions ===
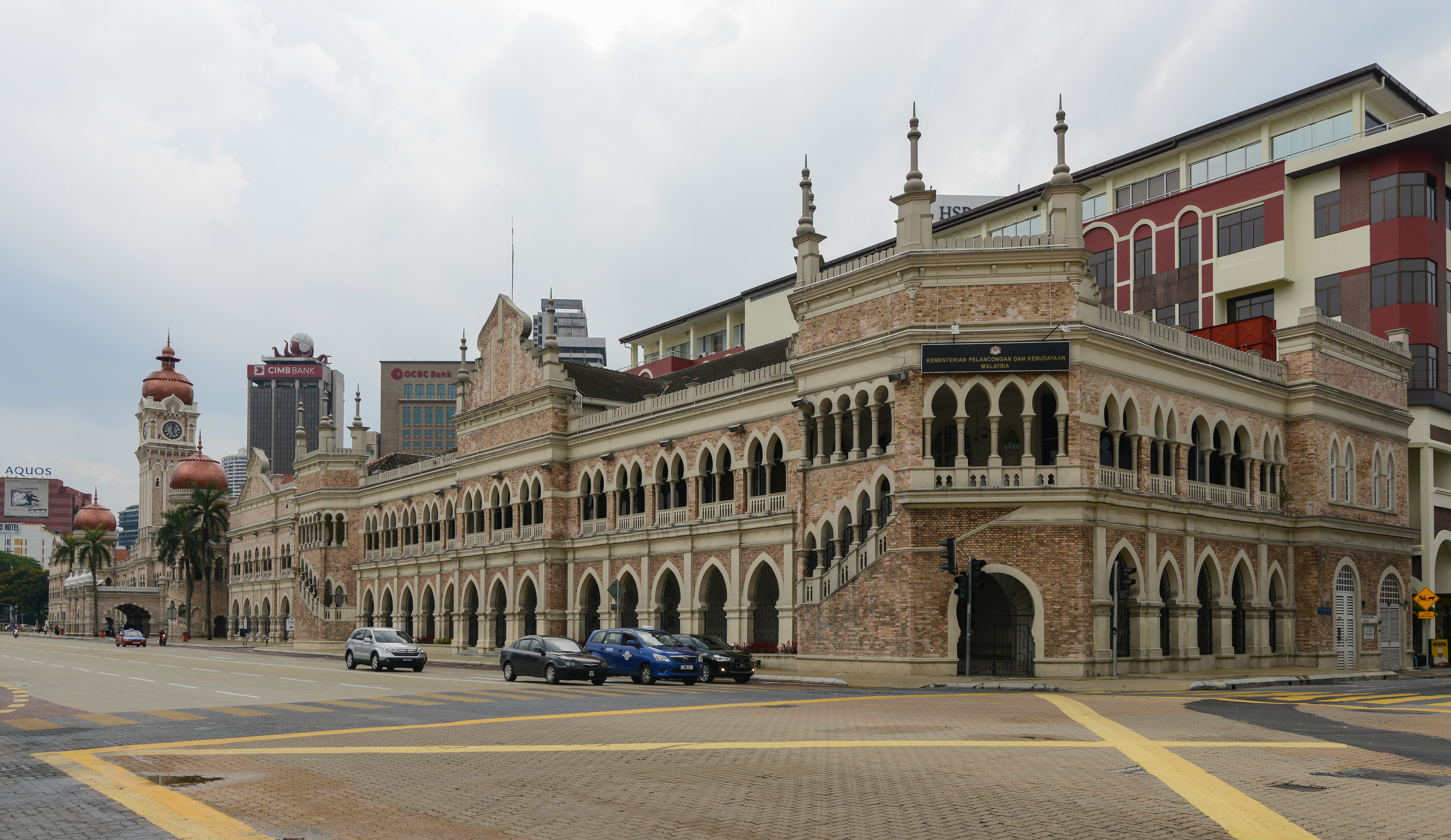
The General Post Office added in 1907

The completed structure housed various important government departments during the British administration. The building, simply known as Government Offices in early Kuala Lumpur maps, housed the Federal Secretariat of the then-Federated Malay States (FMS) which was formed in 1896. The entire FMS administration—the Public Works Department, General Post Office, District Offices, Mines Department, Lands, Audit, Treasury, Government Secretariat Offices—was housed there. It also shared its offices with the Selangor State Government.

As it was not foreseen when construction began in 1894 that Kuala Lumpur would become the capital of the Federated Malay States, the office space provided was inadequate for the needs of a burgeoning bureaucracy. The FMS government took over the offices that were intended for the Sanitation Board. Other buildings and extensions were then constructed around it. A rear wing was added in 1903, and a building built in the same style was added to the south in 1907 to house the General Post Office.

In its early days, there were spires or minarets on the main clock tower, which were removed in 1939 as an air raid precaution. The spires were restored in 2026.

=== Post-independence ===
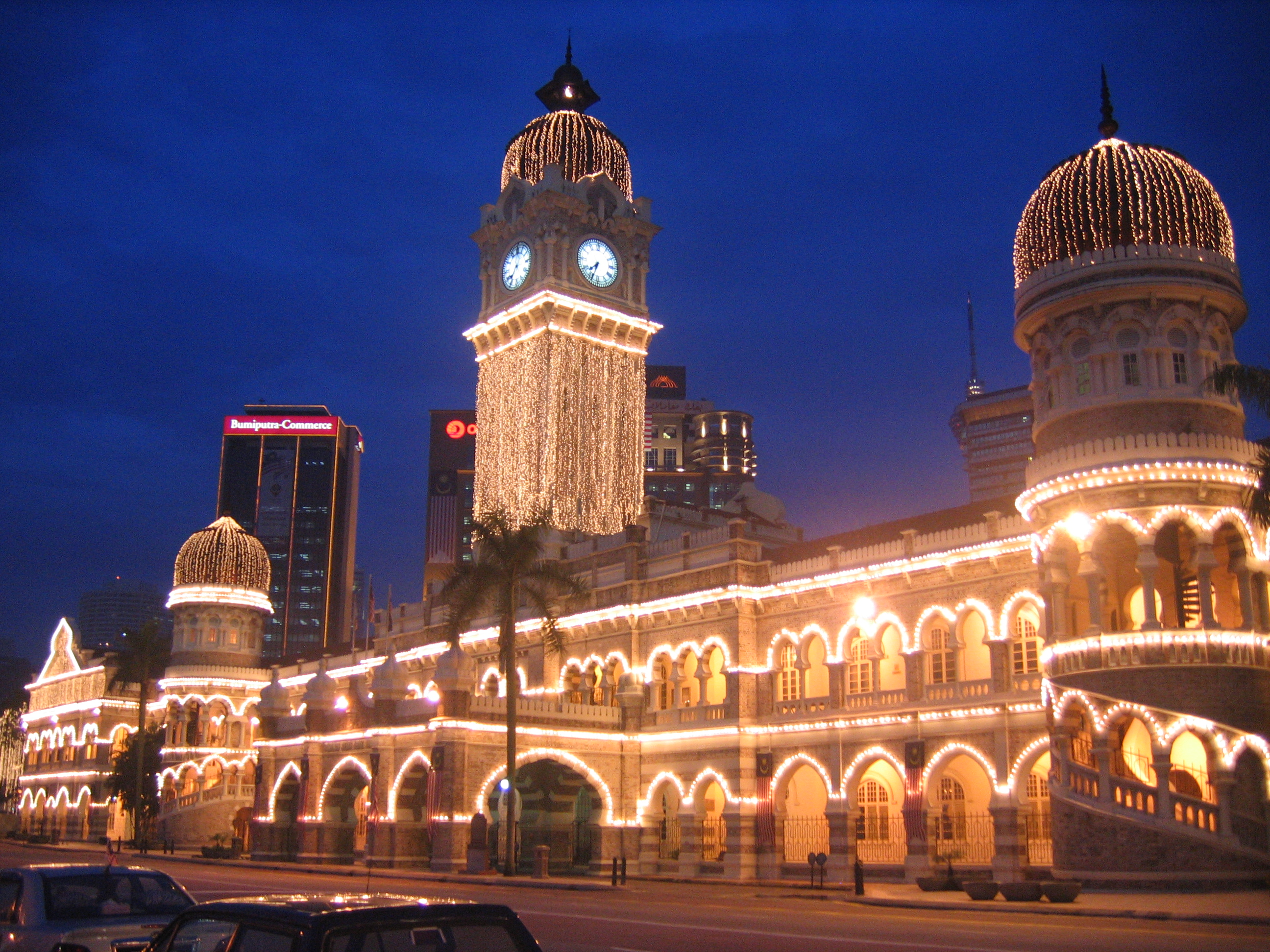
Sultan Abdul Samad Building at night on National Day

Malaya gained independence in 1957, and the Padang or field in front of the Sultan Abdul Samad Building, officially renamed Dataran Merdeka (or Merdeka Square) on 1 January 1990, has become the location for the official celebration of Malayan (later Malaysian) independence since. At Dataran Merdeka, the British Union Jack was lowered for the last time at midnight on 30 August 1957 when the clock started chiming, and the Malayan flag then hoisted for the first time. Celebrations shifted to the Merdeka Stadium in the morning on 31 August with the Declaration of Independence, and Tunku Abdul Rahman became the first prime minister of Malaya.

In 1974, all of the State of Selangor Government offices were relocated to Shah Alam, and the various departments of the Federal Government also moved their offices elsewhere. The building was then renamed Bangunan Sultan Abdul Samad (Sultan Abdul Samad Building) and renovated.

Starting from 1978, the building housed the Court of Appeal, High Court and the Supreme Court, which was subsequently renamed the Federal Court. The Federal Court and the Court of Appeals have since moved to the Palace of Justice located in Putrajaya, the new Federal administrative capital. The building now houses the offices of the Ministry of Information, Communications and Culture of Malaysia and underwent further refurbishment.

Every year, in the morning of Merdeka Day (31 August) as well as Malaysia Day (16 September), thousands of spectators converge on the city to watch the colourful parade along the streets of the city and performances held at the Merdeka Square.

In 2012, the building was partly refurbished and the copper domes received a new coating of metallic paint. New colour-changing LED lights were installed to brighten up the building at night. On selected days, a section of Jalan Raja will be closed in order for the people to enjoy the night scenery of the area. Since 2007, a Merdeka (Independence) wording has been fixed at the bottom of the clock tower, a reminder of the very day of the nation's independence in 1957.

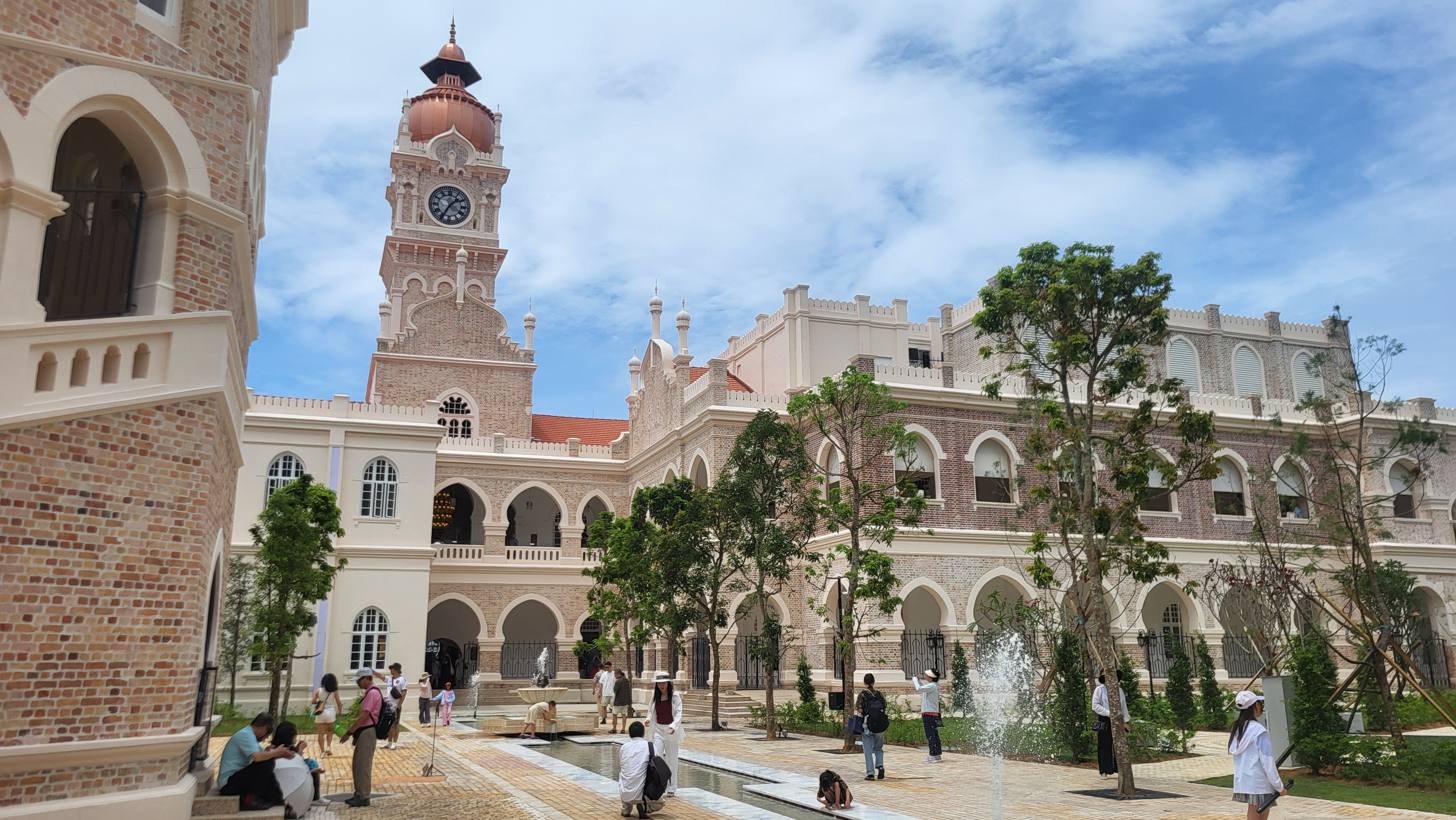
The building after its renovation in 2026

The building underwent a major conservation and restoration programme under the Warisan KL initiative from 2025 until February 2026, with Phase 1 completed after approximately 11 months of works and Block 1 reopening to the public on 2 February 2026.

== Features ==
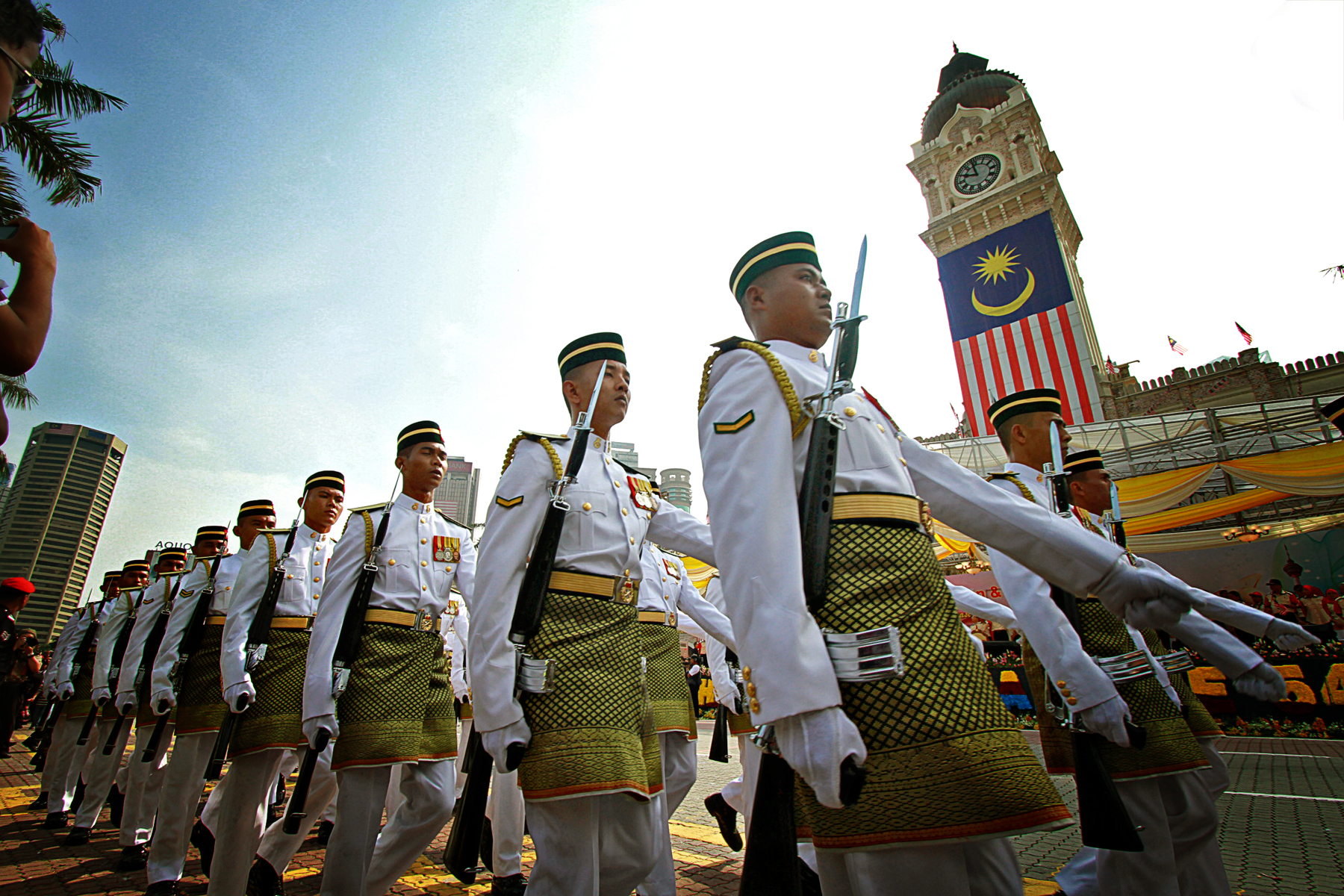
A march past on Malaysia Day

Topped by a shiny copper dome and a 41-metre-high clock tower, it is a major landmark in the city. The clock tower houses a one-ton bell clock that strikes on the hour and half-hour.

A 95-metre flagpole, one of the tallest in the world, marks that spot with a flat, round black marble plaque. It is located at the southern end of the Merdeka Square in front of the building.

The building serves as the backdrop for important events such as the National Day Parade on 31 August and the ushering in of the New Year. Each of the 13 states plus the Federal Territories are represented in the National Day Parade, as are the many ethnic groups that comprise multiracial Malaysia.

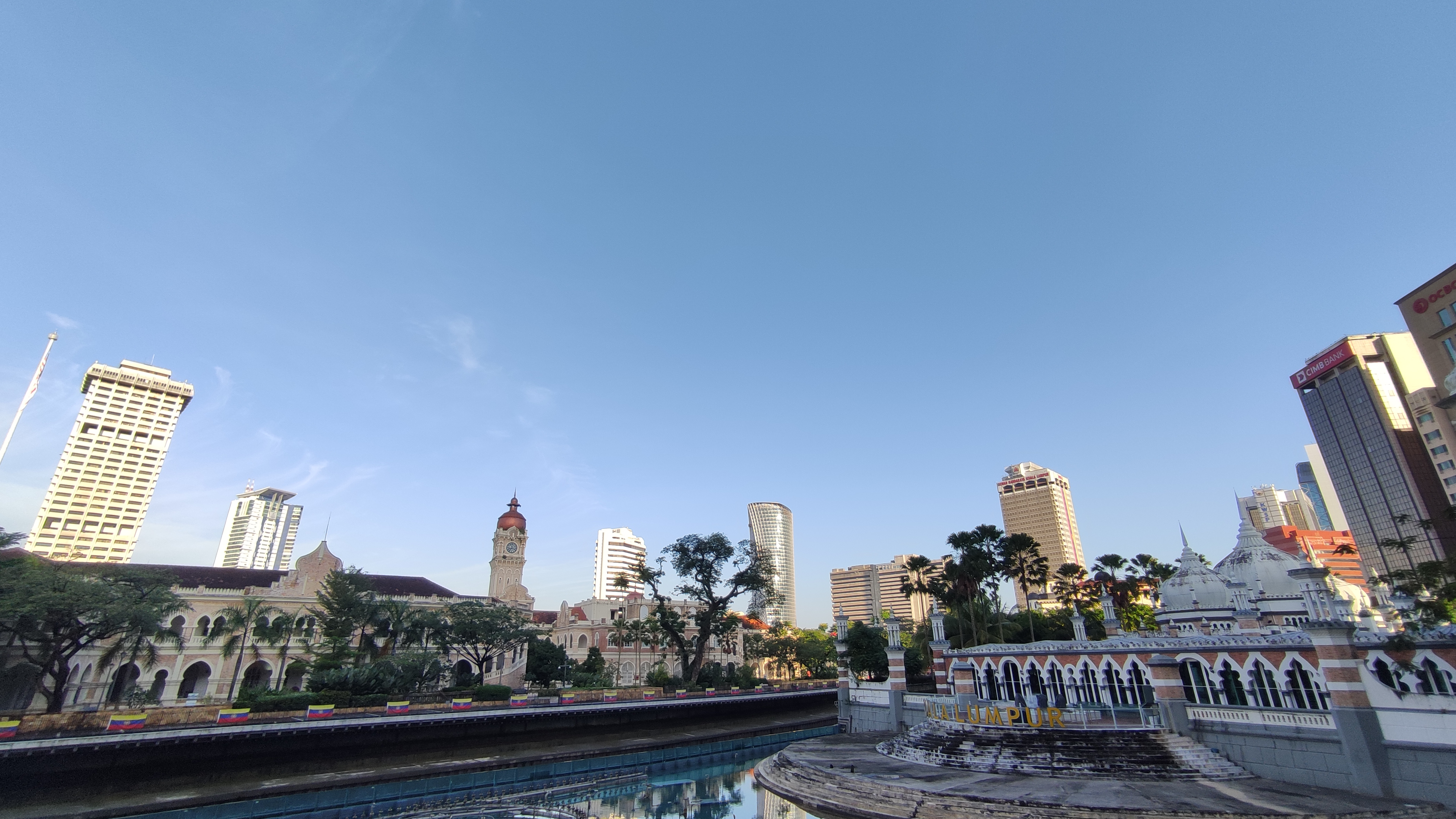
Sultan Abdul Samad Building and Jamek Mosque seen from the confluence of the Gombak and Klang Rivers

Behind the building flows the Klang River and Gombak River's confluence and in the middle of where the two rivers meet stands the Masjid Jamek (or Jamek Mosque), a mosque designed in similar architectural style.

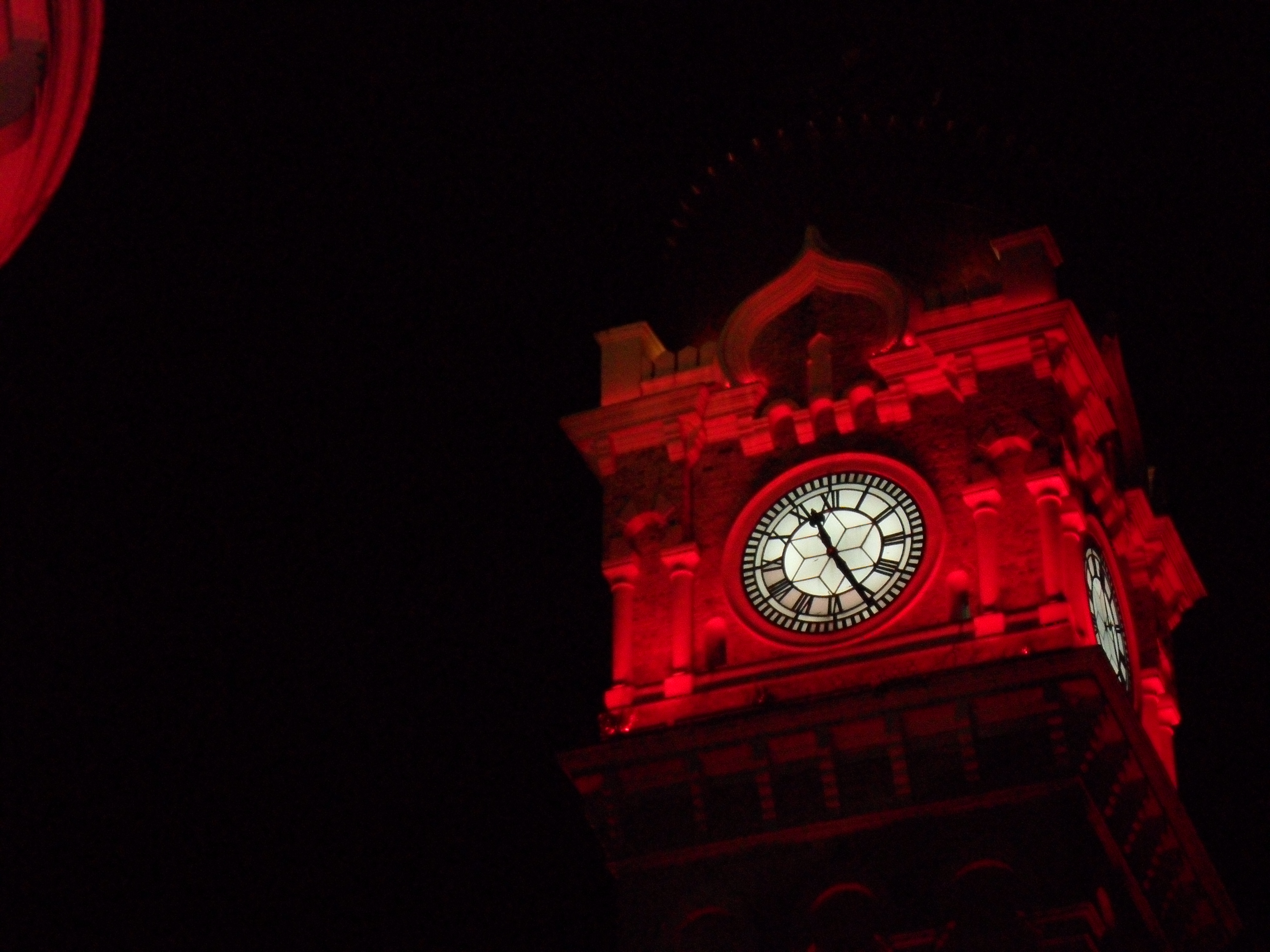
A close-up of the clock atop Sultan Abdul Samad Building at night, in 2013

== Incidents ==
In 1971, Kuala Lumpur suffered a huge flood after a heavy rainfall. Part of the building was not spared. In 1978, a massive renovation was undertaken. The renovation took six years to complete with a total cost of RM 17.2 million. There was also a fire which damaged part of the building. A large bronze memorial plaque commemorating fallen judicial officers and lawyers who served as volunteer soldiers in the Second World War disappeared about this time. The plaque was either looted or else was damaged in the fire but was never repaired or replaced. There is now a move supported by the Malayan Volunteers Group to try to get the bronze memorial plaque restored.

== Transportation ==
The building is accessible within walking distance west of Masjid Jamek LRT Station.

== See also ==
- Dataran Merdeka
- Federated Malay States Survey Office
- Former Supreme Court, Kuala Lumpur
- Palace of Justice, Putrajaya
