= Md Raus Sharif =

Malaysian lawyer

Yang Amat Berbahagia Tun Md Raus Sharif SSM PMN PSM SSAP DUPN SPDK SSTM DA DMPN KMN
- محمد روس شريف

8th Chief Justice of Malaysia
- In office 4 April 2017 – 10 July 2018
- Nominated by: Mohd Najib Abdul Razak
- Appointed by: Muhammad V
- Preceded by: Arifin Zakaria
- Succeeded by: Richard Malanjum

8th President of the Court of Appeal of Malaysia
- In office 12 September 2011 – 4 April 2017
- Nominated by: Najib Razak
- Appointed by: Mizan Zainal Abidin
- Preceded by: Alauddin Mohd Sheriff
- Succeeded by: Zulkefli Ahmad Makinudin

Personal details
- Born: Md Raus bin Sharif; 4 February 1951 (age 75) Rembau, Negeri Sembilan, Federation of Malaya (now Malaysia)
- Citizenship: Malaysian
- Spouse: Salwany Mohamed Zamri
- Children: 2
- Education: Sekolah Tuanku Abdul Rahman
- Alma mater: University of Malaya (LLB); London School of Economics (LLM)

Md Raus bin Sharif (Jawi: محمد روس بن شريف; born 4 February 1951) is a Malaysian lawyer who served as the 8th Chief Justice of Malaysia from 1 April 2017 until 31 July 2018. He replaced Arifin Zakaria.

== Education ==
He began his formal education at Kampung Astana Raja Primary School in Rembau and went on to complete his secondary education in Tunku Besar Secondary School in Tampin. He completed his STPM certificate in Sekolah Tuanku Abdul Rahman (STAR), Ipoh, Perak.

He obtained Bachelor of Laws from University of Malaya in 1976 later obtained Master of Laws from the London School of Economics in 1987.

== Career ==
He joined Legal and Judicial Services as a magistrate in 1976.

On 1 November 1994, he was made a Judicial Commissioner in the High Court at Kuala Lumpur. On 12 January 1996, he was appointed a Judge at the High Court of Malaya. Since then, he had served Shah Alam High Court, Muar High Court, Penang High Court and Kuala Lumpur High Court.

On 28 July 2006, he was appointed a Judge of the Court of Appeal of Malaysia. On 12 September 2011, he was promoted as President of the Court of Appeal of Malaysia.

In 2017, his tenure as the Chief Justice of Malaysia was extended further. The re-appointments of Md Raus and Zulkefli to their respective posts were controversial, as their terms were extended after they reached the mandatory retirement age of 66 years and six months. Bar Council called the move "unconstitutional" and will cause "widespread and severe erosion of public confidence in the judiciary and its independence".

== Family ==
He is married to Toh Puan Salwany Mohamed Zamri and has two children.

== Honours ==
- Malaysia
  - Grand Commander of the Order of Loyalty to the Crown of Malaysia (SSM) – Tun (2017)
  - Commander of the Order of the Defender of the Realm (PMN) – Tan Sri (2012)
  - Commander of the Order of Loyalty to the Crown of Malaysia (PSM) – Tan Sri (2011)
  - Officer of the Order of the Defender of the Realm (KMN) (1994)
- Negeri Sembilan
  - Knight Grand Companion of the Order of Loyalty to Tuanku Muhriz (SSTM) – Dato' Seri (2010)
- Pahang
  - Knight Grand Companion of the Order of Sultan Ahmad Shah of Pahang (SSAP) – Dato' Sri (2016)
- Penang
  - Knight Grand Commander of the Order of the Defender of State (DUPN) – Dato' Seri Utama (2017)
  - Companion of the Order of the Defender of State (DMPN) – Dato' (2000)
- Sabah
  - Grand Commander of the Order of Kinabalu (SPDK) – Datuk Seri Panglima (2016)
- Sarawak
  - Knight Commander of the Order of the Star of Hornbill Sarawak (DA) – Datuk Amar (2016)

Legal offices
Preceded by Arifin Zakaria	Chief Justice of Malaysia; 2017–2018	Succeeded by Richard Malanjum
Preceded by Alauddin Mohd Sheriff	President of the Court of Appeal of Malaysia; 2011–2017	Succeeded by Zulkefli Ahmad Makinudin
