= Ahmad Fairuz Abdul Halim =

Malaysian lawyer

Yang Amat Berbahagia Tun Dato' Seri Ahmad Fairuz Abdul Halim SSM PSM SPMK SJMK SPMS SSDK SSMZ SPMT DSMT DSDK SMS BCK

4th Chief Justice of Malaysia
- In office 16 March 2003 – 31 October 2007
- Nominated by: Mahathir Mohamad
- Appointed by: Sirajuddin
- Preceded by: Mohamed Dzaiddin Abdullah
- Succeeded by: Abdul Hamid Mohamad

3rd President of the Court of Appeal of Malaysia
- In office 1 December 2002 – 14 March 2003
- Nominated by: Mahathir Mohamad
- Appointed by: Sirajuddin
- Preceded by: Wan Adnan Ismail
- Succeeded by: Abdul Malik Ahmad

4th Chief Judge of Malaya
- In office 2001–2002
- Nominated by: Mahathir Mohamad
- Appointed by: Sirajuddin
- Preceded by: Wan Adnan Ismail
- Succeeded by: Haidar Mohamed Noor

Personal details
- Born: Ahmad Fairuz bin Sheikh Abdul Halim; 1 November 1941 (age 84) Alor Setar, Kedah, Unfederated Malay States (now Malaysia)
- Spouse: Mazni Mohd Noor
- Children: 2

Ahmad Fairuz bin Sheikh Abdul Halim (born 1 November 1941) is a Malaysian lawyer who served as the fourth Chief Justice of Malaysia. A controversial figure, he held that position from 2003 to 2006. In August 2006, he courted controversy by suggesting the abolishment of English Common Law to be replaced by Islamic Syariah Law. In September 2007, he was implicated in a 'judicial fixing' scandal. He retired on 1 November 2007 and was retrospectively succeeded by Abdul Hamid Mohamad as the new Chief Justice on the same day.

== Early life and education ==
Ahmad Fairuz Sheikh Abdul Halim was born in Alor Setar, Kedah on 1 November 1941. He received his Bachelor of Laws from the National University of Singapore and later obtained his Master of Laws in International and Comparative Laws from the University of Brussels, Belgium.

== Career ==
He joined the Malaysian Judicial and Legal Service on 4 April 1967 as a Cadet Legal Officer and held various positions such as President of Sessions Court, State Legal Advisor and chairman of the advisory board, Prime Minister's Department. On 1 December 1988 he was appointed Judicial Commissioner of High Court Malaya and was later appointed a High Court Judge. On 1 December 1995 he was elevated as a Court of Appeal Judge until his appointment as a Federal Court Judge on 1 September 2000.

=== Lingam Tape 'Judicial Fixing' Scandal ===
See video clip: "Lingam Tape". Archived from the original on 11 October 2007. See also : Lingam Video Clip

On 19 September 2007, online daily Malaysiakini broke a story on a tape released by former Deputy Prime Minister Anwar Ibrahim, where senior lawyer V.K. Lingam was seen talking to someone believed to be the Chief Justice Ahmad Fairuz. The grainy eight-minute video footage was taken in 2002 at Lingam's Kelana Jaya house. At that time, Ahmad Fairuz was the Chief Judge of Malaya (judiciary's No. 3 post).

The video showed Lingam expressing concern that the outgoing CJ Mohamed Dzaiddin Abdullah was moving 'his men' into top judiciary posts. The conversation revolved around the urgent need to get Ahmad Fairuz appointed Court of Appeal President (No. 2) and then Chief Justice (No. 1). Lingam expressed his plan to get tycoon Vincent Tan, a close ally of then Prime Minister Mahathir Mohamad, and Tengku Adnan Tengku Mansor, a minister in PM's Department to talk to Mahathir on the appointment of judges. Allegedly, this was in return for Ahmad Fairuz's "suffering" in the election petition cases in the past where Ahmad Fairuz had ruled against the Opposition.

Following the revelation, over 2,000 lawyers heeding the call of the Malaysian Bar Council walked from the Palace of Justice to the Prime Minister's Department to demand the Prime Minister set up a Royal Commission to investigate. On 17 November 2007, Prime Minister Abdullah Ahmad Badawi announced that a Royal Commission would be set up to investigate the matter. Ahmad Fairuz denied his involvement, and Anwar responded that he "would love to see him (Ahmad Fairuz) defend himself in the dock as to whether he was lying."

The Royal Commission's methods of arriving at certain conclusions, however, have been criticised by some. They claim that the alleged conversation was a monologue, and, therefore, the commission could not have reliably confirmed who was at the other end of the line. The Commission neither established that the phone call had come from Ahmad Fairuz, nor made a connection between the two, as even Lingam's secretary testified that to her knowledge Ahmad Fairuz had never tried to contact Lingam at his office.

Commission chairman Tan Sri Haidar Mohamed Noor presented a two-volume report on the findings to the Yang di-Pertuan Agong Tuanku Mizan Zainal Abidin at the Istana Negara on 9 May 2008.

== Personal life ==
He is married to Mazni bt Mohd Noor and they have two children.

== Honours ==
=== Honours of Malaysia ===
- Malaysia
  - Grand Commander of the Order of Loyalty to the Crown of Malaysia (SSM) – Tun (2005)
  - Commander of the Order of Loyalty to the Crown of Malaysia (PSM) – Tan Sri (2002)
- Kedah
  - Knight Grand Companion of the Order of Loyalty to the Royal House of Kedah (SSDK) – Dato' Seri (2004)
  - Knight Companion of the Order of Loyalty to the Royal House of Kedah (DSDK) – Dato' (1990)
  - State of Kedah Distinguished Service Star (BCK)
- Kelantan
  - Knight Grand Commander of the Order of the Crown of Kelantan (SPMK) – Dato' (2005)
  - Knight Grand Commander of the Order of the Life of the Crown of Kelantan (SJMK) – Dato' (2003)
- Pahang
  - Knight Grand Companion of the Order of Sultan Ahmad Shah of Pahang (SSAP) – Dato' Sri (2002)
- Selangor
  - Knight Grand Commander of the Order of the Crown of Selangor (SPMS) – Dato' Seri (2003)
  - Companion of the Order of the Crown of Selangor (SMS) (1988)
- Terengganu
  - Knight Grand Companion of the Order of Sultan Mizan Zainal Abidin of Terengganu (SSMZ) – Dato' Seri (2003)
  - Knight Grand Commander of the Order of the Crown of Terengganu (SPMT) – Dato' (1994)
  - Knight Companion of the Order of Sultan Mahmud I of Terengganu (DSMT) – Dato' (1991)

Legal offices
Preceded by Mohamed Dzaiddin Abdullah	Chief Justice of Malaysia; 2003–2007	Succeeded by Abdul Hamid Mohamad
Preceded by Wan Adnan Ismail	President of the Court of Appeal of Malaysia; 2002–2003	Succeeded by Abdul Malek Ahmad
Preceded by Wan Adnan Ismail	Chief Judge of Malaya; 2001–2002	Succeeded by Haidar Mohamed Noor
