= Palace of Justice, Putrajaya =

Seat of Malaysia's apex courts

Palace of Justice
- Istana Kehakiman ايستان کحاکيمن
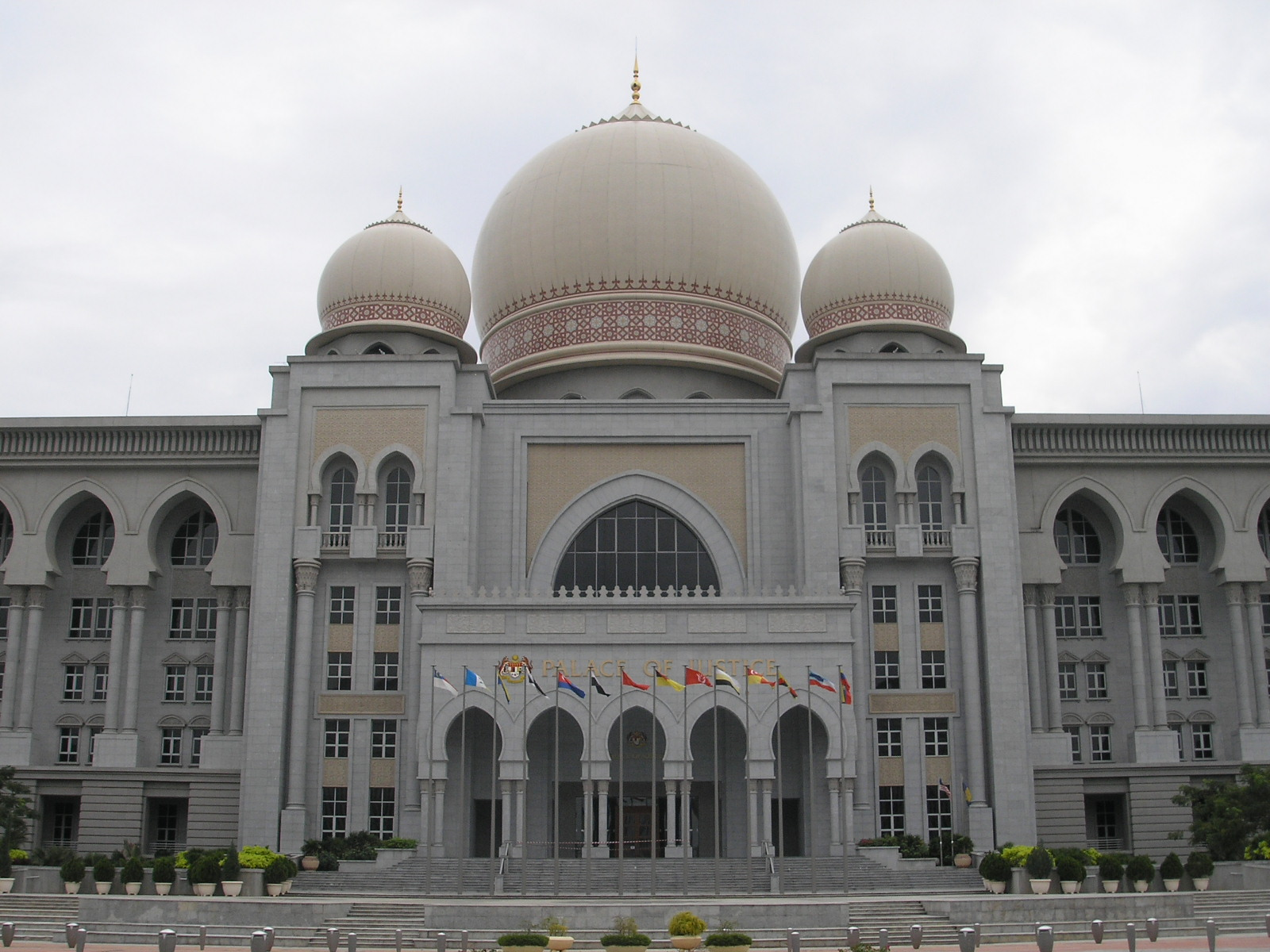

- Location within Malaysia

General information
- Status: Completed
- Type: Federal Court
- Architectural style: Islamic; Moorish; Palladian and Neoclassicism
- Location: Putrajaya, Malaysia
- Coordinates: 2.9170°N 101.6837°E
- Groundbreaking: 1999
- Construction started: 2000
- Completed: 2003
- Inaugurated: 2004
- Cost: RM 362 million

Technical details
- Floor count: 5

Design and construction
- Architect: AR Ahmad Rozi A Wahab
- Architecture firm: aQidea Architect Sdn Bhd

The Palace of Justice (Malay: Istana Kehakiman, Jawi: ايستان کحاکيمن) is a courthouse complex in Putrajaya that serves as the seat for Malaysia's Federal Court and Court of Appeal, which are the highest court and second highest court in the country, respectively. The two courts were previously housed in the Sultan Abdul Samad Building in Kuala Lumpur, before being moved to their present location in 2003, when the construction of the Palace of Justice was completed.

It is located in Precinct 3 of Putrajaya, along the Putrajaya Boulevard and directly in front of the Putrajaya Corporation headquarters. It has two courtrooms for the Federal Court, six courtrooms for the Court of Appeal, a library, a museum, and offices for the registrar of the two courts.

== History ==
=== Proposal and construction ===
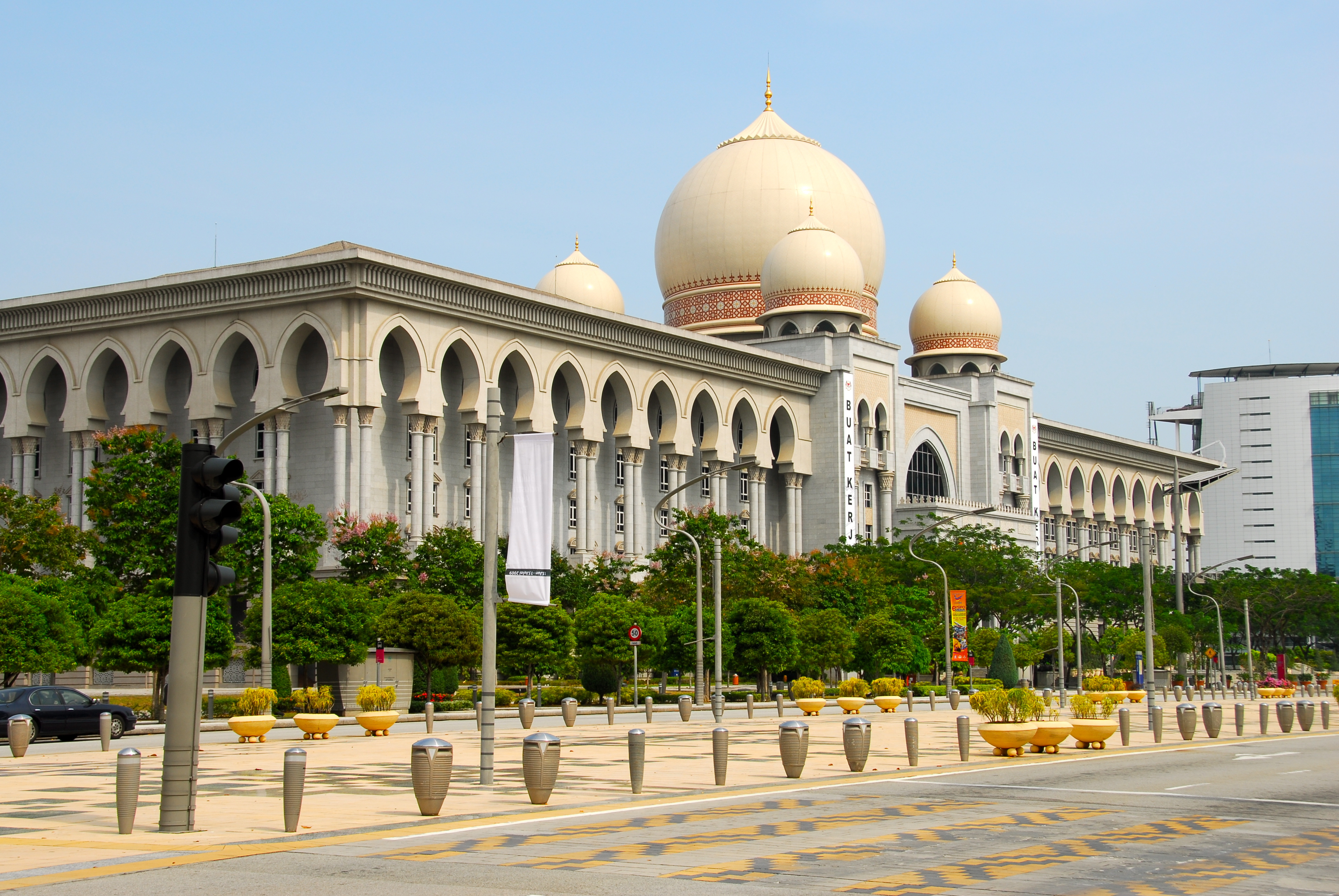
Side view

In August 1999, Deputy Minister in the Prime Minister's Department Ibrahim Ali announced that a new building, styled the "Palace of Justice", will be built in the developing Putrajaya to house the Federal Court and Court of Appeal that would be relocated from Kuala Lumpur.

On 15 September 1999, Ibrahim Ali told reporters that the new building would also house the Syariah courts, in addition to the Federal Court and Court of Appeal, and be equipped with a library and an information technology room. The building would also carry Islamic features.

On 10 June 2002, Minister in the Prime Minister's Department Rais Yatim stated that the construction of the building had reached 25% completion and was on schedule to be completed by mid-2003. The 5-storey building, which cost RM362 million (Note: However, some other news sources claimed the construction cost is at RM270 million.) and was built at a 3.3 hectare site, will also house several holding cells and a police station.

On 5 March 2003, Federal Court chief registrar Abdul Wahab Said Ahmad revealed that the building's construction progress had reached 73% and it was intended to be ready by August of that year. After which the Federal Court and Court of Appeal, originally housed at the Sultan Abdul Samad Building in Kuala Lumpur, would officially move into the new judicial complex on 1 September 2003. However, on 21 August 2003, Chief Justice Ahmad Fairuz Abdul Halim revealed that the planned moving in date is now on 1 October 2003, and the building is expected to be completed on 15 September according to information provided by Putrajaya Holdings.

On 29 August 2003, Prime Minister Mahathir Mohamad together with his wife Siti Hasmah toured the building while being briefed on the construction progress by the Senior General Manager of Putrajaya Holdings, Azlan Abdul Karim. On 31 August 2003, the Palace of Justice became the main backdrop of the 46th National Day celebration, the first National Day celebration to be held in Putrajaya, as the VVIP grandstand was situated right in front of the new building.

On 27 October 2003, the Federal Court sat for the first time at the Palace of Justice, and the first court proceeding was heard by the presiding Chief Judge of Malaya Haidar Mohd Noor together with two federal court judges, Siti Norma Yaakob and Rahmah Hussain.

=== Name change ===
The building was initially given an English name only, which is the name "Palace of Justice", with unofficial Malay translation as "Istana Keadilan". On 15 August 2007 however, the Malaysian Cabinet decided to renamed the building as "Istana Kehakiman" (lit. 'Palace of Judiciary'), citing that major government building should be named in Malay, the national language of Malaysia. The Cabinet also felt that the name Istana Kehakiman is more suitable in reflecting the functions of the building. The name change officially took effect in September 2007.

In May 2008, during a Dewan Rakyat sitting, Bukit Gelugor MP Karpal Singh questioned the name change, and insinuated that the change might be linked to the name of Parti Keadilan Rakyat (PKR), an opposition party at the time.

== Architecture ==
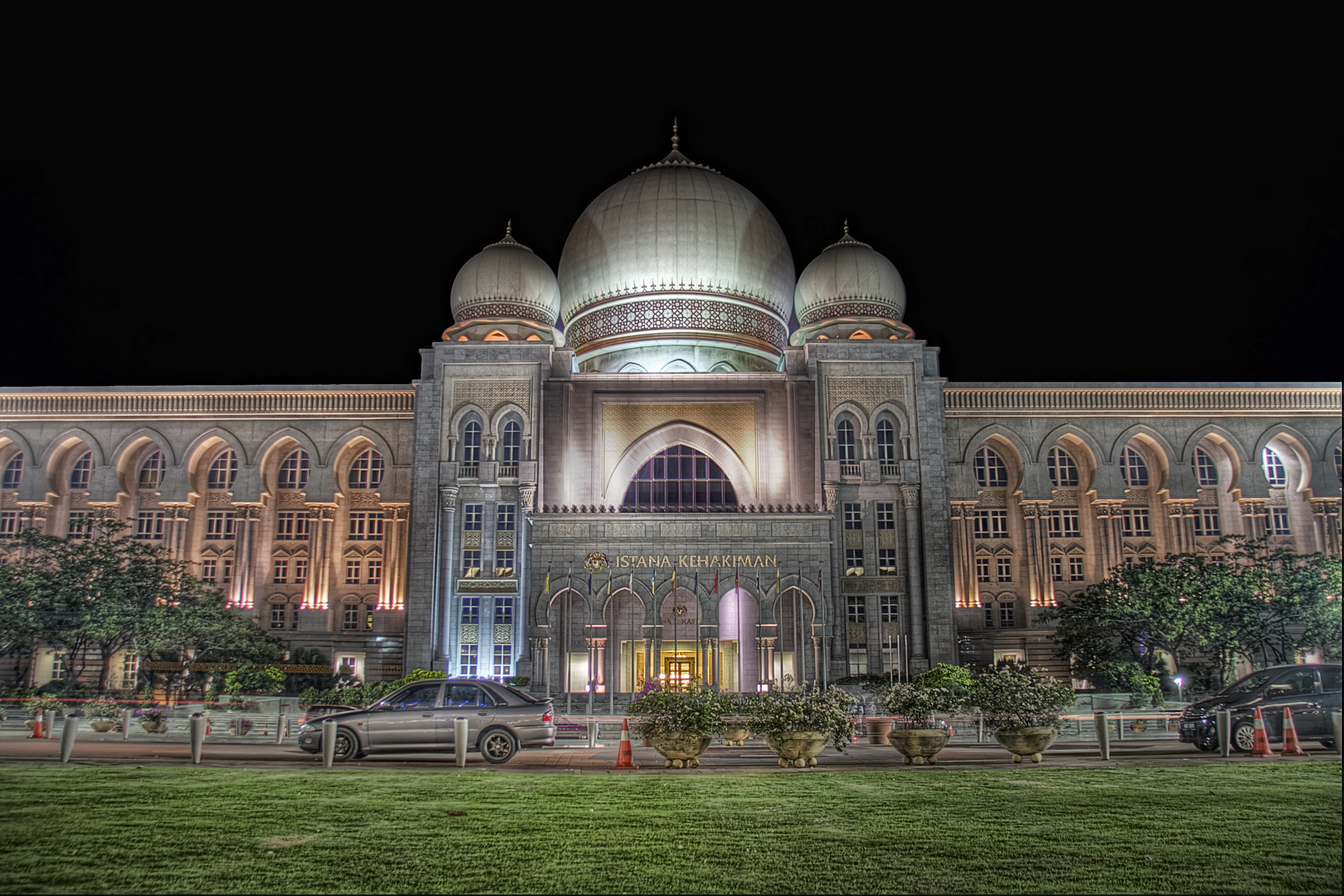
Palace of Justice at night

The courthouse complex was built at Precinct 3 of Putrajaya, and aQidea Architects was the architectural firm commissioned to design the building after finishing the nearby Prime Minister's Office. The building houses two Federal Courts, six Courts of Appeal, the Chief Registrar's Office, two registries for the Federal Court, the Court of Appeal (as required under Articles 121(1B) and 121(2)), a conference hall, a library, and a museum.

The complex has an intricate network of passages that segregate the judges, witnesses, public, and the accused, leading to the courts from the car park or area of arrival. The design is about bringing about "order", and order is the theme of the day as the layouts are fashioned in an orderly manner. AR Ahmad Rozi Abd Wahab, the principal architect, was personally responsible for the design layout and coming up with the architectural concept and ideas.

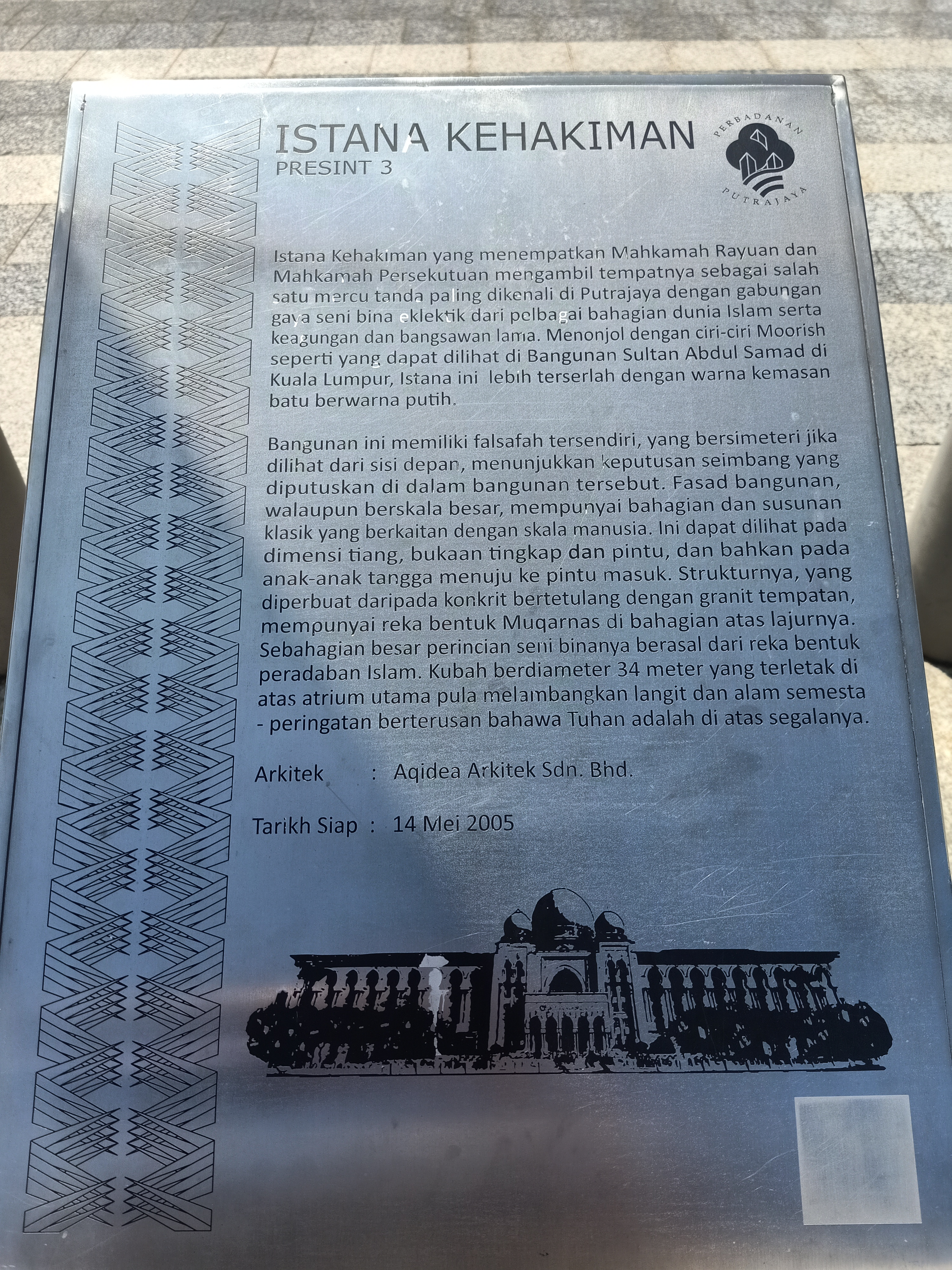
An information board in Malay located in front of the building, describing its architectural features.

The Palace of Justice's design incorporates influences of Classical Islamic culture like Taj Mahal in India, Moorish culture, like the Sultan Abdul Samad Building in Kuala Lumpur, and Western Classical influence, like Palladian. The classical design gives depth to the building skin and creates an interesting articulated facade.

The complex comprises a five-storey building for the judiciary and a two-storey building to house the courts and offices. As of 2003, each of the six Courts of Appeal has a seating capacity of 115, while each of the two Federal Courts has a seating capacity of 119. There are also 347 parking lots for cars and 144 parking bays for motorcycles, as well as a meeting room for the judges, a banquet hall, and a library.

A museum, called the Judicial Museum, was also housed at the building, exhibiting private collections of individuals who had greatly contributed to Malaysia's judiciary and legal field, as well as historical legal instruments and documents. It was first proposed in March 2001 as a memorial for former Lord Presidents and Chief Justices, with the proposed name of "Tun Suffian Memorial", in honour the former Lord President of the Federal Court Tun Mohamed Suffian who had died in 2000.

It was initially temporarily housed at the former Textile Museum in Kuala Lumpur, before being moved to the Palace of Justice in Putrajaya. In August 2002, the government decided to renamed the proposed memorial as the Judicial Museum, as there are views that other individuals who had contributed to the judiciary should be recognised as well. However in October 2002, Tunku Sofiah Jewa, who had cared for Tun Suffian in his last days, urged the government to reconsider the change.

== Interior ==
There is a large central atrium (Rotunda) around which the various rooms are arranged. The atrium helps to guide visitors who had just arrived into the building and has clear visual connection to the other floors above.

The Library is located on the Ground floor adjacent to the entrance door, with the hearing rooms of both the Federal and Appeal Courts located on the first floor. The Registries and offices of the Appeal and Federal Courts are on the second and third floors respectively. The Judges chambers of the Appeal and Federal Court are located on the fourth and fifth floor.

The locations of these functions are designed on designated levels to ensure privacy and security. Even the location of car parking are segregated between the judges, the staffs and the public. The arrival point for people driving their cars to the Palace of Justice are carefully scrutinised to ensure safety, security and privacy. The layout is designed to have direct access for judges to go to their respective chambers from their car park. Public spaces are designed to certain secured zones only.

== Incidents ==
On 17 April 2004, a 53 years old Singaporean remisier in a staged suicide attempt, climbed to the roof of the building to protest a court decision made against him. He shouted "Hakim tipu!" (Judge cheated!) and "Hakim makan duit!" (Judge took money!) on the roof, and thrown several paper aeroplanes that were made from his self-made press statement to the gathering onlookers below. He also demanded to meet with reporters and the judge. Putrajaya police chief Mohd Khalil negotiated with the man for an hour, while constable Y.H. Tan, the only Chinese policeman among the on scene police officers, conversed with the man in Cantonese to calm him down.

Although the man had claimed to the police that he "had nothing to live for", he eventually came down from the building after reporters were allowed to enter the roof. It also appears he came prepared for his protest, as he had brought along a bottle of water, a change of clothes, a cell phone and a charger. At the end of the 5-hour long ordeal, the man was arrested by the police for questioning.

In January 2005, a reader's letter to Malaysiakini and New Straits Times written by Azhar Othman complained that smoking ban at the cafeteria of the Palace of Justice was not properly enforced, and smokers continued to smoke at the premise despite being told against it and the presence of no smoking sign at the cafeteria. He also revealed that enforcers of Putrajaya Corporation, the local authority for Putrajaya, allegedly smoked at the cafeteria as well despite the smoking ban.

== Gallery ==
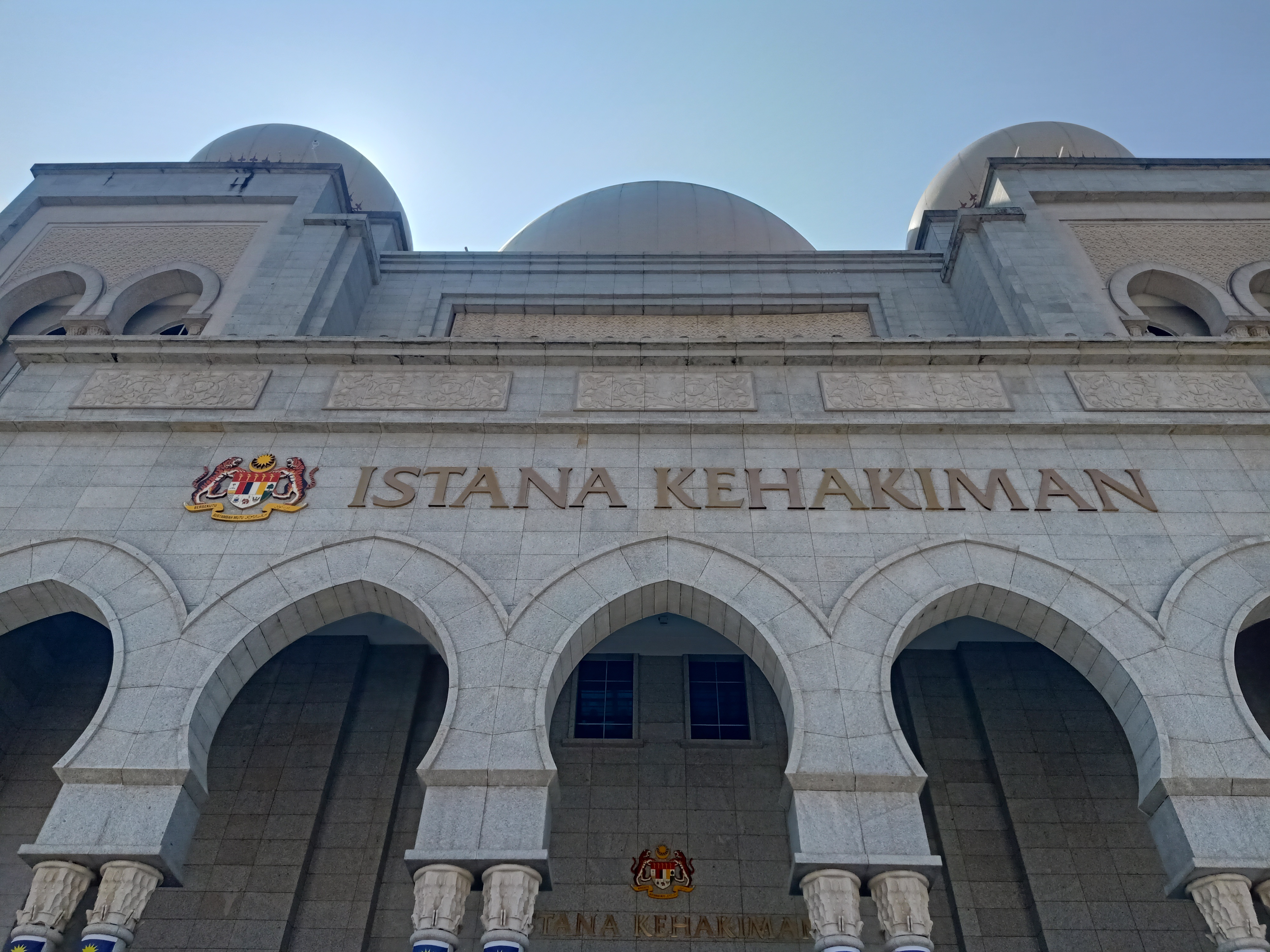
Front facade of the building

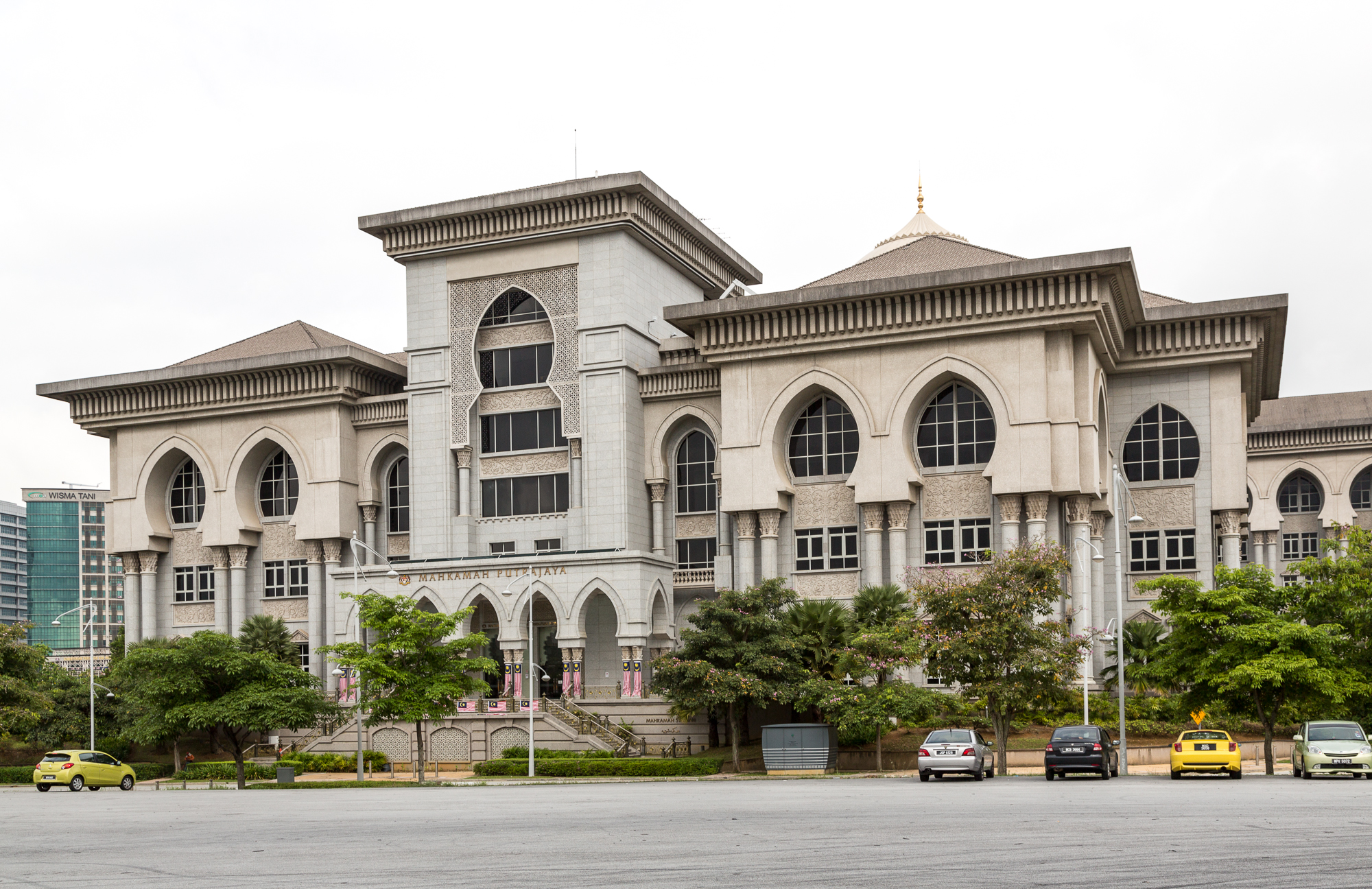
Backside annexe which houses the subordinate courts and Syariah courts

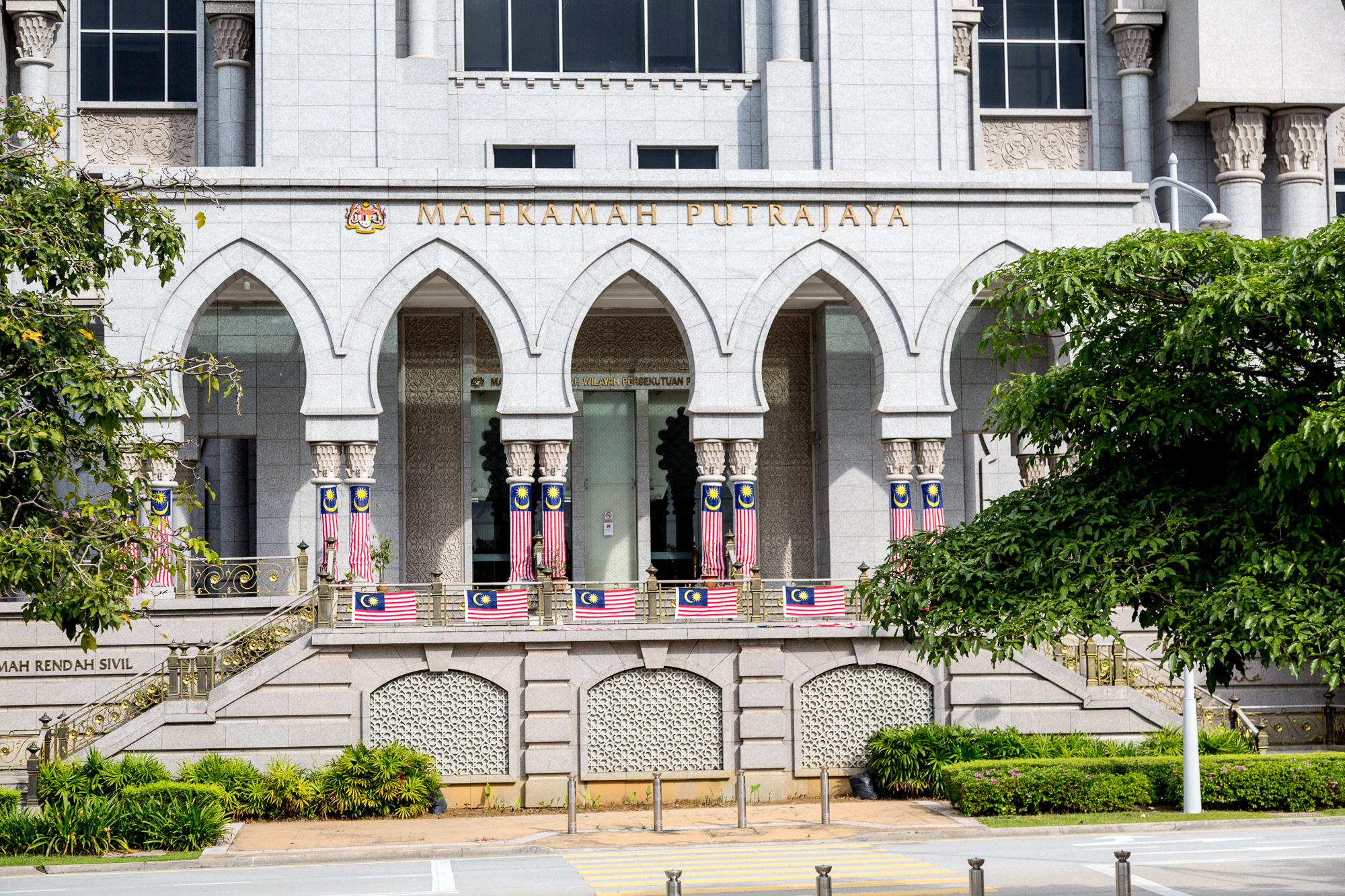
Back entrance of the building

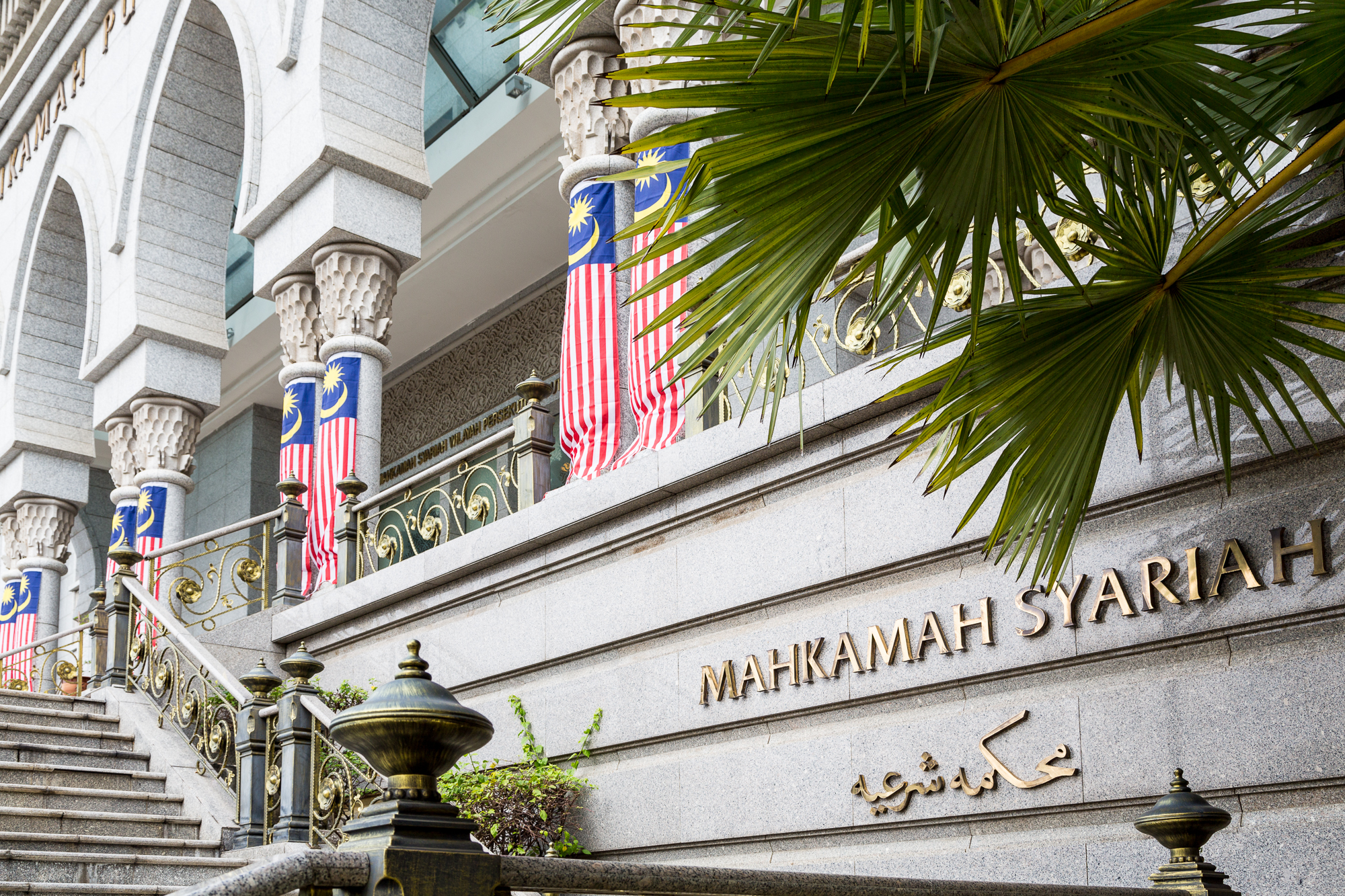
Syariah court at the building

== See also ==
- Kuala Lumpur Courts Complex, seat of the High Court of Malaya in Kuala Lumpur and other subordinate courts
- Sultan Abdul Samad Building, former seat of the Federal Court and Court of Appeal
- Perdana Putra, office of the Prime Minister of Malaysia
- Malaysian Houses of Parliament, the building that housed the federal legislature of Malaysia
