= President of the Court of Appeal of Malaysia =

Office and title of the deputy head of the judiciary system of Malaysia

- Incumbent; Abu Bakar Jais since 18 July 2025
- Style: Yang Amat Arif; The Right Honourable; Her Ladyship
- Member of: Federal Court of Malaysia
- Seat: Palace of Justice, Putrajaya
- Nominator: Prime Minister of Malaysia
- Appointer: Yang di-Pertuan Agong
- Term length: mandatory retirement age at 65 or 66 (at request for minimal extension)
- Constituting instrument: Federal Constitution of Malaysia
- Inaugural holder: Lamin Mohd Yunos
- Salary: RM31,500 monthly
- Website: www.kehakiman.gov.my

The President of the Court of Appeal of Malaysia (Malay: Presiden Mahkamah Rayuan), is the office and title of the deputy head of the Malaysian judiciary system. The title has been in use since 24 June 1994, when the Court of Appeal of Malaysia was formed. The President of the Court of Appeal is the head of the Court of Appeal, the second highest court of Malaysia. It is the second highest position in Malaysian judicial system after the Chief Justice of Malaysia and followed by the Chief Judge of Malaya, and the Chief Judge of Sabah and Sarawak.

== Presidents of the Court of Appeal of Malaysia ==
- Lamin Haji Mohd Yunos (1994 to 2001)
- Wan Adnan Ismail (2001)
- Ahmad Fairuz Abdul Halim (2002 to 2003)
- Abdul Malik Ahmad (2004 to 2007)
- Abdul Hamid Mohamad (2007)
- Zaki Azmi (2007 to 2008)
- Alauddin Mohd Sheriff (2008 to 2011)
- Md Raus Sharif (2011 to 2017)
- Zulkefli Ahmad Makinudin (2017 to 2018)
- Ahmad Maarop (2018 to 2019)
- Rohana Yusuf (2019 to 2022)
- Abang Iskandar Abang Hashim (2023 to 2025)
- Abu Bakar Jais (2025 to present)

== See also ==
- Courts of Malaysia
