= Court of Appeal of Malaysia =

Malaysian appellate court

- Mahkamah Rayuan Malaysia محکمه رايوان مليسيا

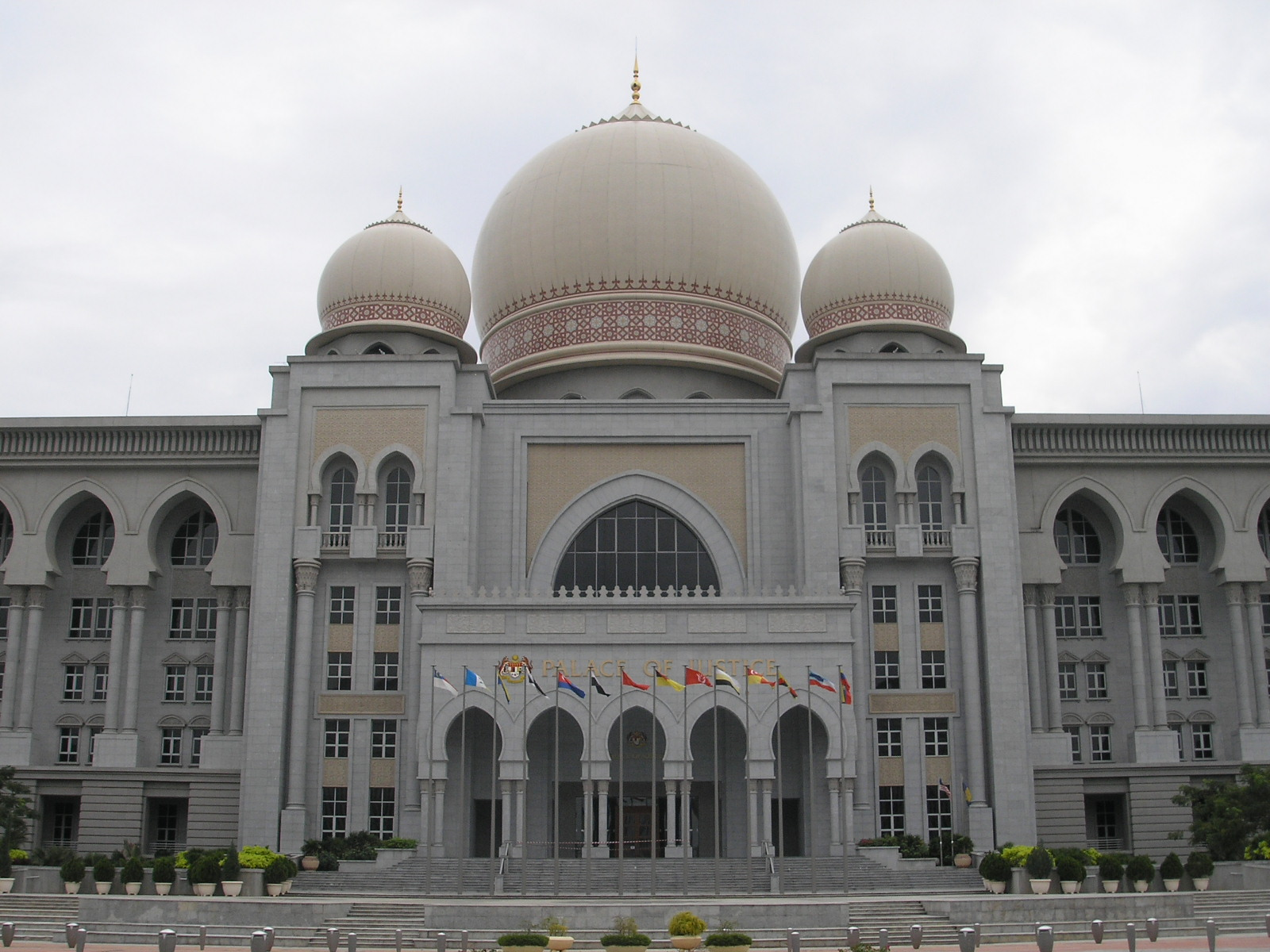
- The Court of Appeal is located in the Palace of Justice in Putrajaya.
- Interactive map of Court of Appeal of Malaysia
- Established: 1994
- Jurisdiction: Malaysia
- Location: Palace of Justice, Putrajaya, FT
- Composition method: Royal appointment with the advice of the Prime Minister
- Authorised by: Federal Constitution
- Appeals to: Federal Court of Malaysia
- Judge term length: Compulsory retirement at age 66
- Number of positions: 33 (including 3 vacancies)
- Website: www.kehakiman.gov.my

President of the Court of Appeal of Malaysia
- Currently: Abu Bakar Jais
- Since: 18 July 2025

The Court of Appeal (Malay: Mahkamah Rayuan Malaysia; Jawi: محکمه رايوان مليسيا) is an appellate court of the judiciary system in Malaysia. It is the second highest court in the hierarchy below the Federal Court. This court was created in 1994 as part of reforms made to the judiciary to create a second tier appellate court after the right to appeal to the Privy Council of the United Kingdom was abolished in 1985. The court is headed by the President of the Court of Appeal of Malaysia, who is the second most senior post in Malaysian judiciary after the Chief Justice of Malaysia.

On 17 January 2023, Abang Iskandar was sworn in by the Yang di-Pertuan Agong as the President of the Court of Appeal, succeeding Rohana Yusuf, the first woman to serve in this position, who had retired upon reaching the mandatory retirement age in November 2022. On 3 July 2025, Abang Iskandar retired from the position and the position is being temporarily held by Zabariah Mohd Yusof.

== Presidents of the Court of Appeal ==
| President | Appointment date | Departure date |
|---|---|---|
| Abdul Malek Ahmad | 2004 | 2007 |
| Abdul Hamid Mohamad | 2007 | 2007 |
| Zaki Mohamed Azmi | 2007 | 2008 |
| Alauddin Mohd Sheriff | 2008 | 2011 |
| Mohamed Raus Sharif | 2011 | 2017 |
| Zulkefli Ahmad Makinudin | 2017 | 2018 |
| Ahmad Maarop | 2018 | 2019 |
| Rohana Yusuf | 2019 | 2022 |
| Abang Iskandar Abang Hashim | 2023 | 2025 |
| Abu Bakar Jais | 2025 | |

== Current judges ==
This is the list of current judges of the Court of Appeal.

| Prefix | Judge | Post | Date of appointment |
|---|---|---|---|
| Yang Amat Arif Dato' | Abu Bakar Jais | President of the Court | 18 July 2025 |
| Yang Arif Datuk | Yaacob Md Sam | Judge | 21 March 2016 |
| Yang Arif Datuk | Abdul Karim Abdul Jalil | Judge | 21 March 2016 |
| Yang Arif Dato' | Suraya Othman | Judge | 23 September 2017 |
| Yang Arif Datuk | Hanipah Farikullah | Judge | 27 April 2018 |
| Yang Arif Datuk Wira | Kamaludin Md Said | Judge | 27 April 2018 |
| Yang Arif Dato' | Mohamad Zabidin Mohd Diah | Judge | 26 November 2018 |
| Yang Arif Datuk | Nor Bee Ariffin | Judge | 26 November 2018 |
| Yang Arif Dato' | Has Zanah Mehat | Judge | 26 November 2018 |
| Yang Arif Dato' | Lee Swee Seng | Judge | 8 August 2019 |
| Yang Arif Datuk | Azizah Nawawi | Judge | 8 August 2019 |
| Yang Arif Datuk | Vazeer Alam Mydin Meera | Judge | 8 August 2019 |
| Yang Arif Datuk | Ravinthran a/l Paramaguru | Judge | 8 August 2019 |
| Yang Arif Dato' | Hadhariah Syed Ismail | Judge | 5 December 2019 |
| Yang Arif Dato' | Abu Bakar Jais | Judge | 5 December 2019 |
| Yang Arif Tuan | Nantha Balan a/l E.S. Moorthy | Judge | 5 December 2019 |

== See also ==
- 1Malaysia Development Berhad scandal
