= Chief Justice of Malaysia =

Government position

- Ketua Hakim Negara Malaysia كتوا حاكيم نڬارا مليسيا

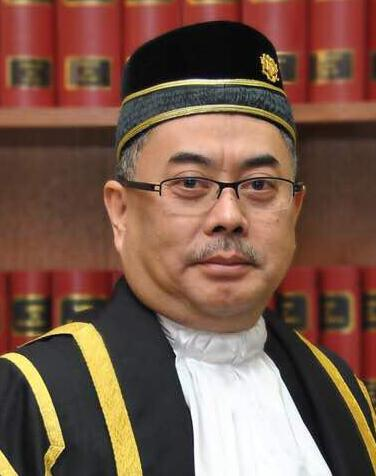
- Incumbent; Wan Ahmad Farid Wan Salleh since 28 July 2025
- Federal Court of Malaysia
- Style: Yang Amat Arif; The Right Honourable; His Lordship
- Member of: Federal Court of Malaysia
- Seat: Palace of Justice, Putrajaya
- Nominator: Prime Minister of Malaysia
- Appointer: Yang di-Pertuan Agong on the recommendation and advice of the Prime Minister
- Term length: mandatory retirement age at 65 or 66 (at request for minimal extension)
- Constituting instrument: Constitution of Malaysia
- Inaugural holder: James Thompson as Chief Justice of the Federation of Malaya (1957)
- Deputy: President of the Court of Appeal of Malaysia
- Salary: RM46,800 monthly
- Website: www.kehakiman.gov.my

The chief justice of Malaysia (Malay: Ketua Hakim Negara Malaysia; Jawi: كتوا حاكيم نڬارا مليسيا), also known as the chief justice of the Federal Court, is the office and title of the head of the Malaysian judiciary system. The title has been in use since 1994, and prior to this it was known as the lord president of the Federal Court. The chief justice is the head of the Federal Court, the apex court of Malaysia. It is the highest position in Malaysian judicial system followed by the president of the Court of Appeal of Malaysia, chief judge of Malaya, and the chief judge of Sabah and Sarawak.

The position is currently held by Wan Ahmad Farid Wan Salleh, who was sworn into the office on 28 July 2025.

== Constitutional basis ==
The office of chief justice of the Federal Court is established under Article 122 of the Constitution of Malaysia, which establishes the then-Supreme Court (now Federal Court) as consisting of a lord president (now chief justice), the chief judges of the High Courts and at least four other judges and such additional judges as may be appointed pursuant to Clause (1A).

== Role ==
The chief justice is first among equals among the judges of the Federal Court, and the position differs little from that of the other judges. All judges, including the chief justice, are appointed by the Yang di-Pertuan Agong (King of Malaysia), on the advice of the prime minister of Malaysia. Under Article 125 of the Malaysian Constitution, they can be removed only by the Yang di-Pertuan Agong, on a recommendation from a tribunal consisting of at least five judges who are current or former Federal Court judges. Reasons for removal include the chief justice:

- not following the Judges’ Code of Ethics; or
- being physically or mentally unable to carry out his or her duties.

The prime minister will then provide the Yang di-Pertuan Agong the reason(s) why the chief justice should be removed. The Yang di-Pertuan Agong will then proceed to set up the tribunal to make a decision.

== Chief justices of Malaysia ==
As of 7 September 2026 a total of 10 chief justices were appointed, listed below:

#	Portrait	Chief Justice (birth–death)	Term of office			Monarch	Prior senior judicial offices
#	Portrait	Chief Justice (birth–death)	Took office	Left office	Time in office	Monarch	Prior senior judicial offices
1		Tun Dato' Seri; Abdul Hamid Omar (1929–2009)	10 November 1988	24 September 1994	5 years, 319 days	Iskandar; Azlan Shah; Ja'afar	
2		Tun Dato' Seri; Mohd Eusoff Chin (1936–2026)	25 September 1994	19 December 2000	6 years, 86 days	Ja'afar; Salahuddin	Chief Judge of Malaya (1994)
3		Tun Dato' Seri; Mohamed Dzaiddin Abdullah (1938–2024)	20 December 2000	14 March 2003	2 years, 85 days	Salahuddin; Sirajuddin	
4		Tun Dato' Sri; Ahmad Fairuz Abdul Halim (b.1941)	16 March 2003	31 October 2007	4 years, 230 days	Sirajuddin; Mizan Zainal Abidin	Judge of the High Court of Malaysia (1989-1995); Judge of the Court of Appeal of Malaysia (1995-2000); Judge of the Federal Court of Malaysia (2000-2001); Chief Judge of Malaya (2001–2002); President of the Court of Appeal of Malaysia (2002-2003)
5		Tun; Abdul Hamid Mohamad (1942–2026)	2 November 2007	18 October 2008	352 days	Mizan Zainal Abidin	President of the Court of Appeal of Malaysia (2007)
6		Tun Dato' Seri; Zaki Azmi (b.1945)	18 October 2008	9 September 2011	2 years, 327 days	Mizan Zainal Abidin	Judge of the Federal Court of Malaysia (2007); President of the Court of Appeal of Malaysia (2007–2008)
7		Tun; Arifin Zakaria (b.1950)	12 September 2011	31 March 2017	5 years, 201 days	Mizan Zainal Abidin; Abdul Halim; Muhammad V	Judge of the High Court of Malaysia (1994-2002); Judge of the Court of Appeal of Malaysia (2002-2005); Judge of the Federal Court of Malaysia (2005-2008); Chief Judge of Malaya (2008–2011)
8		Tun; Md Raus Sharif (b.1951)	1 April 2017	10 July 2018	1 year, 101 days	Muhammad V	Judge of the High Court of Malaysia (1996-2006); Judge of the Court of Appeal of Malaysia (2006-2011); President of the Court of Appeal of Malaysia (2011–2017)
9		Tun Datuk Seri Panglima; Richard Malanjum (b.1952)	11 July 2018	12 April 2019	276 days	Muhammad V Abdullah	Judge of the High Court of Malaysia (2004-2006); Judge of the Court of Appeal of Malaysia (2002-2005); Judge of the Federal Court of Malaysia (2005-2006); Chief Judge of Sabah and Sarawak (2006–2018)
10		Tun; Tengku Maimun Tuan Mat (b.1959)	2 May 2019	2 July 2025	6 years, 62 days	Abdullah; Ibrahim Iskandar	Judge of the High Court of Malaysia (2007–2013); Judge of the Court of Appeal of Malaysia (2013–2018); Judge of the Federal Court of Malaysia (2018–2019)
11		Datuk Seri Utama; Wan Ahmad Farid Wan Salleh (b.1962)	28 July 2025	Incumbent	1 year, 42 days	Ibrahim Iskandar	Judge of the High Court of Malaysia (2019–2024); Judge of the Court of Appeal of Malaysia (2024–2025)

=== Living former chief justices ===
Name	Term of office	Date of birth
Ahmad Fairuz Abdul Halim	2003–2007	1 November 1941 (age 84)
Zaki Azmi	2008–2011	12 September 1945 (age 80)
Arifin Zakaria	2011–2017	1 October 1950 (age 75)
Mohamed Raus Sharif	2017–2018	4 February 1951 (age 75)
Richard Malanjum	2018–2019	13 October 1952 (age 73)
Tengku Maimun Tuan Mat	2019–2025	2 July 1959 (age 67)

== See also ==
- Courts of Malaysia
- 2007 Royal Commission of Inquiry into the Lingam Video Clip
