= Federal Court of Malaysia =

Highest court of appeals in Malaysia

- Mahkamah Persekutuan Malaysia محكمه ڤرسكوتوان مليسيا

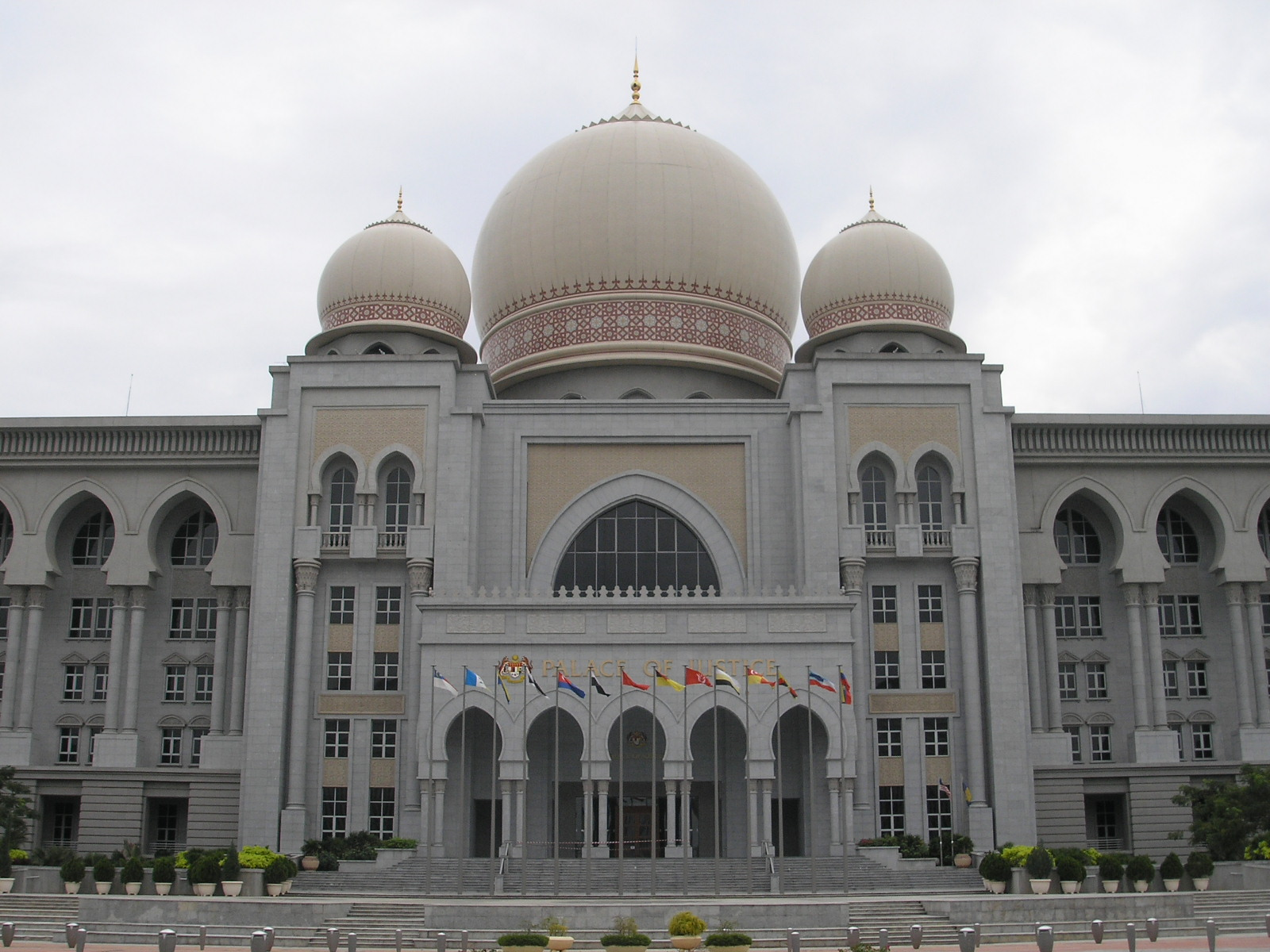
- The Federal Court is located in the Palace of Justice in Putrajaya.
- Interactive map of Federal Court of Malaysia
- Established: 1957
- Jurisdiction: Malaysia
- Location: Palace of Justice, Putrajaya
- Composition method: Royal appointment with the advice of the Prime Minister
- Authorised by: Federal Constitution
- Judge term length: Compulsory retirement at age 66 and 6 months
- Number of positions: 15
- Website: Official website

Chief Justice
- Currently: Wan Ahmad Farid Wan Salleh
- Since: 28 July 2025

The Federal Court of Malaysia (Malay: Mahkamah Persekutuan Malaysia; Jawi: محكمه ڤرسكوتوان مليسيا) is the highest court and the final appellate court in Malaysia. It is housed in the Palace of Justice in Putrajaya. The court was established during Malaya's independence in 1957 and received its current name in 1994.

== History ==
The earliest predecessor of the Federal Court was the Court of Judicature of Prince of Wales' Island (now Penang), Singapore and Malacca, which was established by the Second Charter of Justice, issued by the Crown as letters patent dated 27 November 1826. The Court was presided over by the Governor of the Straits Settlements and Resident Councillor of the settlement where the court was to be held, and another judge called the Recorder. The Third Charter of Justice of 12 August 1855 reorganised the Court, providing the Straits Settlements with two Recorders, one for Prince of Wales' Island and the other for Singapore and Malacca.

Following the reconstitution of the Straits Settlements as a Crown colony with effect from 1 April 1867, the Court of Judicature was replaced by the Supreme Court of the Straits Settlements. The Governor and Resident Councillors ceased to be judges of the Court.

Further changes to the Court's constitution were made in 1873. It now consisted of two divisions – the Chief Justice and the Senior Puisne Judge formed the Singapore and Malacca division of the Court, while the Judge of Penang and the Junior Puisne Judge formed the Penang division. The Supreme Court also received jurisdiction to sit as a Court of Appeal in civil matters. In 1878 the jurisdiction and residence of judges was made more flexible, thus impliedly abolishing the geographical division of the Supreme Court. Appeals from decisions of the Supreme Court lay first to the Court of Appeal and then to the Queen-in-Council, the latter appeals being heard by the Judicial Committee of the Privy Council.

As a result of legislation passed in 1885, the Supreme Court consisted of the Chief Justice and three puisne judges. The Court was significantly altered in 1907. It now had two divisions, one exercising original civil and criminal jurisdiction and the other appellate civil and criminal jurisdiction.

During the Japanese occupation of Singapore (1942–1945), all the courts that had operated under the British were replaced by new courts established by the Japanese Military Administration. The Syonan Koto-Hoin (Supreme Court) was formed on 29 May 1942; there was also a Court of Appeal, but it was never convened.

Following the end of World War II, the courts that had existed before the war were restored. There was no change in the judicial system when the Straits Settlements were dissolved in 1946 and Singapore became a crown colony in its own right, except that the Supreme Court of the Straits Settlements became known as the Supreme Court of Singapore.

The courts of Penang and Malacca merged with the rest of Malaya to form the Supreme Court of the Federation of Malaya. This continued upon independence in 1957 until 1963. When Malaya, Sabah, Sarawak, and Singapore formed Malaysia in 1963, the court was renamed the Federal Court of Malaysia.

The judicial power of Malaysia was vested in a Federal Court, a High Court in Malaya, a High Court in Borneo (now the High Court in Sabah and Sarawak), and a High Court in Singapore (which replaced the Supreme Court of the Colony of Singapore). Appeals lay from the High Court in Singapore to the Federal Court in Kuala Lumpur, and then to the Privy Council.

The merger did not last: in 1965 Singapore was separated from the Federation of Malaysia and became an independent republic. However, the High Court of Singapore remained part of the Malaysian Federal Court structure until 1969, when Singapore enacted the Supreme Court of Judicature Act to regularise the judicial system.

Before 1985, the Federal Court remained the second highest court in the land, being subordinate to the Privy Council in England. On 1 January 1978, appeals to the Privy Council in criminal and constitutional matters were abolished, while appeals in civil matters were abolished on 1 January 1985. When appeals to the Privy Council were abolished, the court was renamed Supreme Court of Malaysia. Finally, on 24 June 1994, as part of reforms, the court was once again renamed the Federal Court of Malaysia.

== Current judges ==
The court is composed of the Chief Justice, President of the Court of Appeal, the Chief Judges of the High Court in Malaya and the High Court in Sabah and Sarawak and 11 other Federal Court judges. The Chief Justice is also the head of the judiciary in Malaysia. All judges are appointed by the Yang di-Pertuan Agong on the advice of the Prime Minister of Malaysia. All judges mandatorily retire at the age of 66 and 6 months. In order of seniority, they are as follows:

Name	Born	Alma mater	Invested	Mandatory retirement	Duration	Prior senior judicial roles
Yang Amat Arif Tun; Wan Ahmad Farid Wan Salleh (Chief Justice of Malaysia)	13 November 1962 (age 63)	Thames Valley University; University of Malaya	28 July 2025	12 May 2029	318 days	Justice of the High Courts of Malaysia (2019–2024); Justice of the Court of Appeal of Malaysia (2024–2025)
Yang Amat Arif Datuk Seri; Abu Bakar Jais (President of the Court of Appeal)	27 June 1962 (age 63)	University of Malaya; University of London	13 June 2023	26 December 2028	2 years and 363 days	Justice of the High Courts of Malaysia (2016–2019); Justice of the Court of Appeal of Malaysia (2019–2023)
Yang Amat Arif Datuk Seri; Hashim Hamzah (Chief Judge of Malaya)	26 December 1961 (age 64)	University of Malaya	3 December 2025	25 June 2028	190 days	Justice of the High Courts of Malaysia (2014-2021); Justice of the Court of Appeal of Malaysia (2021–2025)
Yang Amat Arif Dato'; Azizah Haji Nawawi (Chief Judge of Sabah and Sarawak)	9 January 1962 (age 64)	University of Otago	28 July 2025	8 July 2028	318 days	Justice of the High Courts of Malaysia (2014–2019); Justice of the Court of Appeal of Malaysia (2019–2025)
Yang Arif Dato'; Rhodzariah Bujang	5 November 1961 (age 64)	University of Malaya	25 March 2020	4 May 2028	6 years and 78 days	Justice of the High Courts of Malaysia (2011–2017); Justice of the Court of Appeal of Malaysia (2017–2020)
Yang Arif Dato'; Nordin Hassan	13 July 1963 (age 62)	International Islamic University Malaysia	17 January 2023	12 January 2030	3 years and 145 days	Justice of the High Courts of Malaysia (2017–2020); Justice of the Court of Appeal of Malaysia (2020–2023)
Yang Arif Datuk'; Vazeer Alam Mydin Meera	3 January 1962 (age 64)	National University of Singapore; Aberystwyth University; International Islamic University Malaysia	18 March 2024	2 July 2028	2 years and 85 days	Justice of the High Courts of Malaysia (2015–2019); Justice of the Court of Appeal of Malaysia (2019–2024)
Yang Arif Tan Sri; Ahmad Terrirudin Mohd Salleh	12 April 1968 (age 58)	University of Malaya	12 November 2024	11 October 2034	1 year and 211 days	-
Yang Arif Dato'; Lee Swee Seng	26 November 1960 (age 65)	University of Malaya	20 May 2025	25 May 2027	1 year and 22 days	Justice of the High Courts of Malaysia (2014–2019); Justice of the Court of Appeal of Malaysia (2019–2025)
Yang Arif Dato'; Che Mohd Ruzima Ghazali	10 July 1961 (age 64)	University of Malaya	3 December 2025	9 January 2028	190 days	Justice of the High Courts of Malaysia (2016–2020); Justice of the Court of Appeal of Malaysia (2020–2025)
Yang Arif Dato'; Mohd Nazlan Mohd Ghazali	26 November 1967 (age 58)	University of Oxford	3 December 2025	25 May 2034	190 days	Justice of the High Courts of Malaysia (2017–2022); Justice of the Court of Appeal of Malaysia (2022–2025)
Yang Arif Dato'; Collin Lawrence Sequerah	21 October 1960 (age 65)	University of London; University of Malaya	3 December 2025	20 April 2027	190 days	Justice of the High Courts of Malaysia (2018–2023); Justice of the Court of Appeal of Malaysia (2023–2025)
Yang Arif Dato'; Azimah Omar	2 July 1962 (age 63)	University of Malaya	3 December 2025	1 January 2029	190 days	Justice of the High Courts of Malaysia (2017–2023); Justice of the Court of Appeal of Malaysia (2023–2025)
Yang Arif Datuk; Ravinthran N Paramaguru	21 January 1962 (age 64)	University of Malaya	21 April 2026	20 July 2028	51 days	Justice of the High Courts of Malaysia (2013–2018); Justice of the Court of Appeal of Malaysia (2019–2026)
Yang Arif Dato'; Azmi Ariffin	1 November 1960 (age 65)	University of Malaya	21 April 2026	30 April 2027	51 days	Justice of the High Courts of Malaysia (2017–2023); Justice of the Court of Appeal of Malaysia (2023–2026)

== Building ==
The Federal Court is located in the Palace of Justice in the federal administrative capital of Putrajaya. It was previously housed in the Sultan Abdul Samad Building in Kuala Lumpur.
