= Arthur Charles Alfred Norman =

British architect

Arthur Charles Alfred Norman (A. C. Norman)
- Born: Arthur Charles Alfred Norman; 1858
- Died: 17 October 1944 (aged 86)
- Occupation: Architect

Arthur Charles Alfred Norman (1858–1944), often referred to as A. C. Norman, was a British architect who was active in Malaya at the end of the 19th century and the beginning of 20th century. Some of the most important colonial era buildings of Kuala Lumpur built in that period were credited to him, although many of these also involved other architects of the period.

== Early life ==
A. C. Norman was born in 1858 and grew in Plymouth, England. He was taught architecture by his father Alfred Norman and worked as his assistant in the years 1874–1878. He also worked under E. D. Bellamy, Consulting Engineer to Corporation of Plymouth. From 1879 to 1883 he worked as Inspector of Buildings and draughtsman to the Borough Engineer of Plymouth. He achieved his professional qualification when he was made an Associate of the Royal Institute of British Architects (ARIBA) on 23 May 1881 when he was 23.

== Career in architecture ==
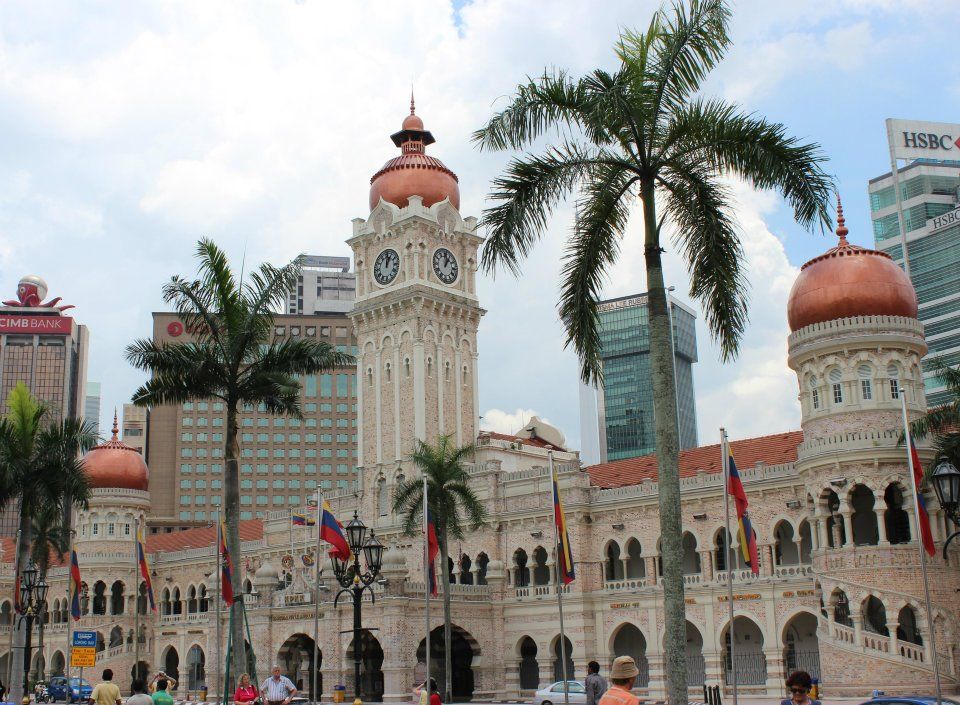
A. C. Norman designed the ground plan of the Sultan Abdul Samad Building

In 1883, he left England and went to work in the Selangor Public Works Department as the Assistant Superintendent to civil engineer H.F. Bellamy, and became the Government Architect in 1890.

He worked under the auspices of the Malaysian Public Works Department (PWD) until 1903, during which some of the colony's most distinguished public buildings were built. He became a Fellow of the Royal Institute of British Architects (FRIBA) on 27 July 1896.

During his tenure in the Public Works Department, many of the buildings erected by the department has an eclectic style known as Indo-Saracenic. The earliest and most prominent example of this style of architecture in Malaya is the Sultan Abdul Samad Building. As Norman held the position of the Government Architect, many buildings built in the period were credited to him, but were in fact largely the work of his subordinates such as Arthur Benison Hubback and R. A. J. Bidwell.

In 1903, when he was 45, Norman was compulsorily retired on ground of inefficiency. He returned to England, where he continued to practice as an architect in Norwich and Plymouth. In 1928 he was elected the President of Devon Architectural Society. He died on 17 October 1944.

== Buildings ==
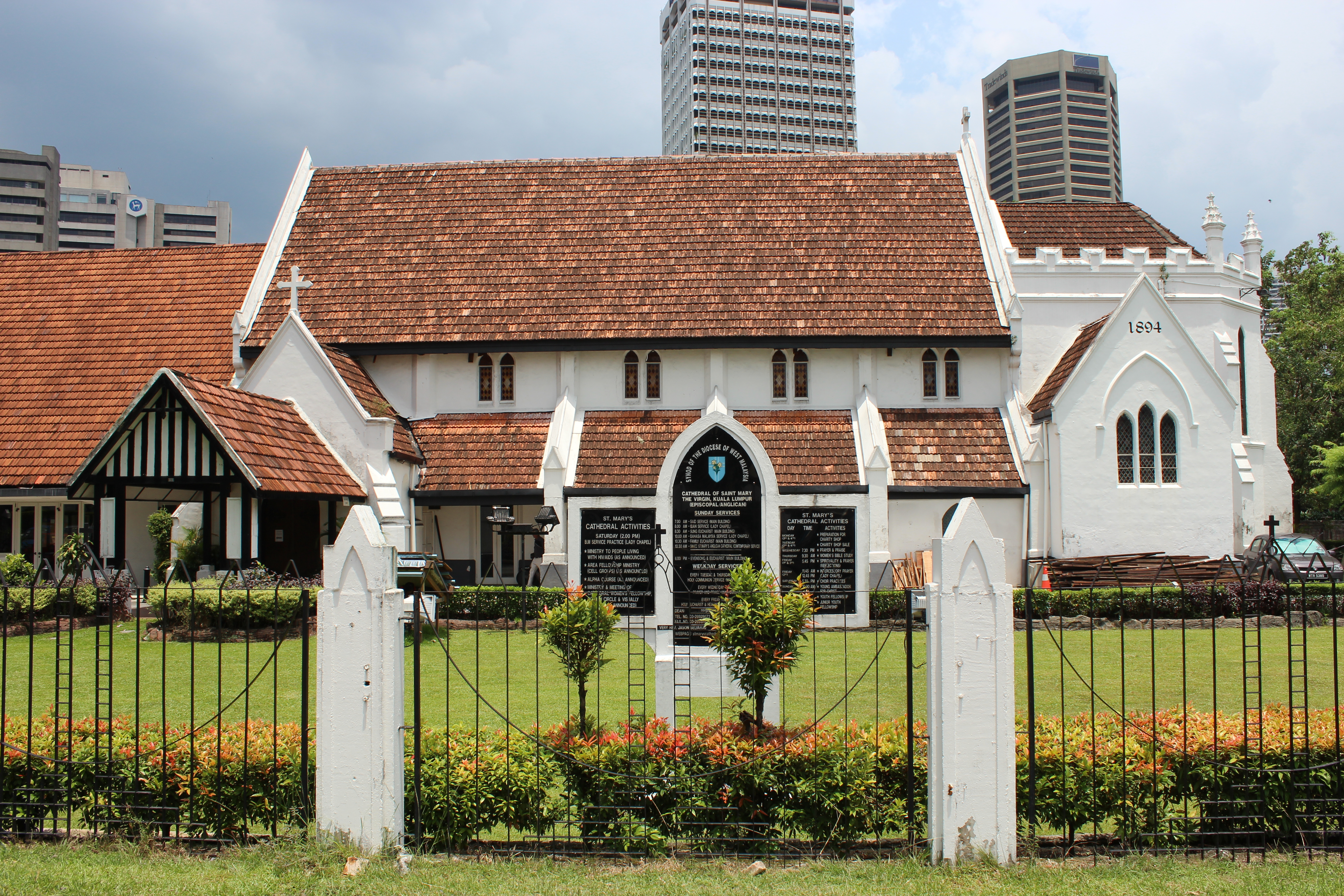
St Mary's Church

During his time of service, Arthur Charles Alfred Norman contributed to the design of some of Malaysia’s most important buildings in the historic core of Kuala Lumpur lining the perimeter of Merdeka Square.

Works credited to him include:

- Royal Selangor Club (1890) – later replaced by a building of A. B. Hubback's design in 1910.
- Residence of the British Resident of Selangor (1888) – now part of Tunku Abdul Rahman Putra Memorial.
- Victoria Institution (1893) – the current VI building on a different location is by Swan and Maclaren, and the older building by Norman is now a cultural centre.
- St. Mary's Church (1894)
- Pudu Prison (1895, largely demolished with the main gate preserved as a heritage structure)
- National Textile Museum (1895)
- Panggung Bandaraya DBKL (1896)
- Sultan Abdul Samad Building (1897)
- Kuala Lumpur Library (1909)

Some of these, such as the Sultan Abdul Samad Building, were designed to a large extent by other people, and he received the credit for these buildings as he was the State Architect at the time. Works attributed to him and known to be by his own hand include St. Mary's Church.

== Assessment ==
A. C. Norman's most significant structure is the Sultan Abdul Samad Building. Built between 1894 and 1897, it is located in front of Independence Square, Jalan Raja, Kuala Lumpur. Prior to the work of Norman, Bidwell and Hubback, the onion dome did not exist in the Peninsular Malaysia. Their work introduced to the Malayan peninsula a new architectural vocabulary which is now seen as part of the region's architectural heritage. For most of the 20th century, it was Malaysia's most iconic structure. Norman however was only responsible for the ground plan, the elevations of the building is largely the work of R. A. J. Bidwell. Furthermore, the Indo-Saracenic style, first introduced to Kuala Lumpur in the Sultan Abdul Samad Building, came as a result of a suggestion by the State Engineer of Selangor Public Works Department Charles Edwin Spooner. Hubback was originally hired to work as a draftsman in the Malaysian Public Works Department and worked on many buildings for the department. Hubback later became the department's lead architect, and eclipsing Norman who previously held the position with his building designs.

According to historian J. M. Gullick, Norman was a man of modest ability and did not have the flair and originality required for many of the works attributed to him. Norman applied twice for promotion and was refused both times – on his second attempt, the then British Resident of Selangor J. C. Belfied noted that it was "misleading" for Norman to claim credit for many of the works as "Mr. Norman had little or nothing to do with their design or construction in a number of instances".
