= Railway Administration Building, Kuala Lumpur =

Early 20th century building in Kuala Lumpur, Malaysia

Coordinates: 3°08′26″N 101°41′34″E

Railway Administration Building
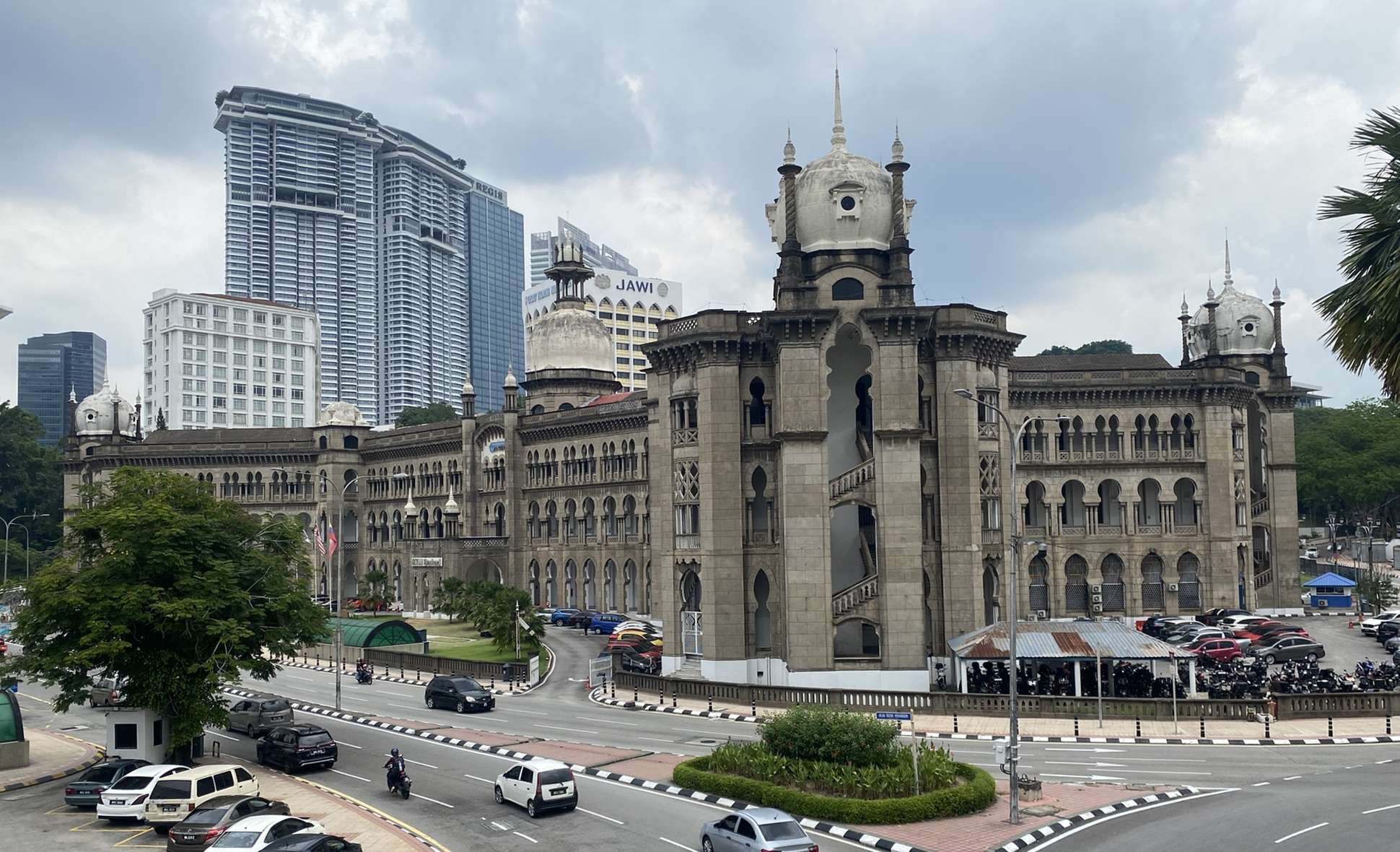
- the Railway Administration Building in 2026
- Interactive map of the Railway Administration Building area

General information
- Architectural style: Indo-Saracanic
- Location: Jalan Sultan Hishamuddin, Kuala Lumpur, Malaysia
- Current tenants: Keretapi Tanah Melayu
- Completed: 29 September 1917
- Cost: $587,000
- Owner: Railway Assets Corporation

Technical details
- Floor count: 3

Design and construction
- Architect: Arthur Benison Hubback
- Main contractor: Towkay Chua Hua Tong

The Railway Administration Building is a historical building in Kuala Lumpur, Malaysia. Completed in 1917 to serve as the offices of Federated Malay States Railways, it currently houses the headquarters of Keretapi Tanah Melayu Berhad (KTM) or Malayan Railway Limited, which operates rail services in Peninsular Malaysia.

== History ==
In 1913, Arthur Benison Hubback, Government Architect, Federated Malay States was commissioned by Federated Malay States Railways to design a building to serve as its new headquarters. Construction was carried out by contractor Towkay Chua Hua Tong under the supervision of Public Works Department assistant architect W.S. Huxley and architect Thomas Steele, and was completed in 1917.

== Description ==
Situated facing the old Kuala Lumpur railway station, completed seven years earlier to Hubback's design, the building's Indo-Saracenic design was similar to several other of Hubback's buildings in Kuala Lumpur including the former Municipal Office and Town Hall, Federated Malay States Survey Office and Jamek Mosque. The three storey building was the highest in the Federated Malay States on completion, and includes a central octagonal cantilever staircase described at the time as the only example east of Suez.

The building suffered major damage on two occasions. During the Second World War its north wing was damaged due to bombing, and in 1968 the same wing was damaged in a fire.
