= Hubback =

Hubback is a surname. Notable people with the surname include:

- Arthur Benison Hubback (1871–1948), English architect
- Catherine Hubback (1818–1877), English novelist
- Eva Marian Hubback (1886–1949), English feminist
- George Hubback (1882–1955), English Anglican priest
- Gordon Hubback (1902–1970), British Royal Navy admiral
- Theodore Hubback (1872–1942), English engineer, conservationist and author
