= Charles Edwin Spooner =

British engineer

Charles Edwin Spooner (C. E. Spooner)
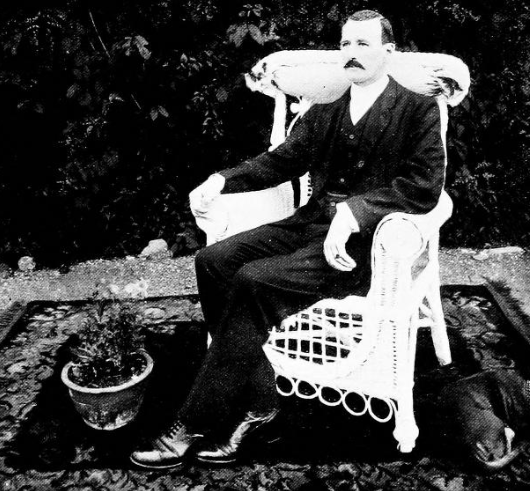
- Born: 22 November 1853; Hafod Tan y Craig, North Wales
- Died: 14 May 1909 (aged 55); Kuala Lumpur, Malaya
- Occupation: Engineer
- Spouse: Martha Brownrigg Chartres
- Children: One son, one daughter

Charles Edwin Spooner (1853–1909) was a British engineer who worked in Malaya. He oversaw the construction of many important buildings in Kuala Lumpur, and he reorganised and expanded the railway system in the Federated Malay States.

== Early life ==
C. E. Spooner was born on 22 November 1853 at Hafod Tan y Craig, North Wales, the youngest son of Charles Easton Spooner. He received his education in Engineering at Trinity College, Dublin, and became the resident engineer of the North Wales Narrow Gauge Railways from 1874 to 1876 at the time of its construction.

== Career ==
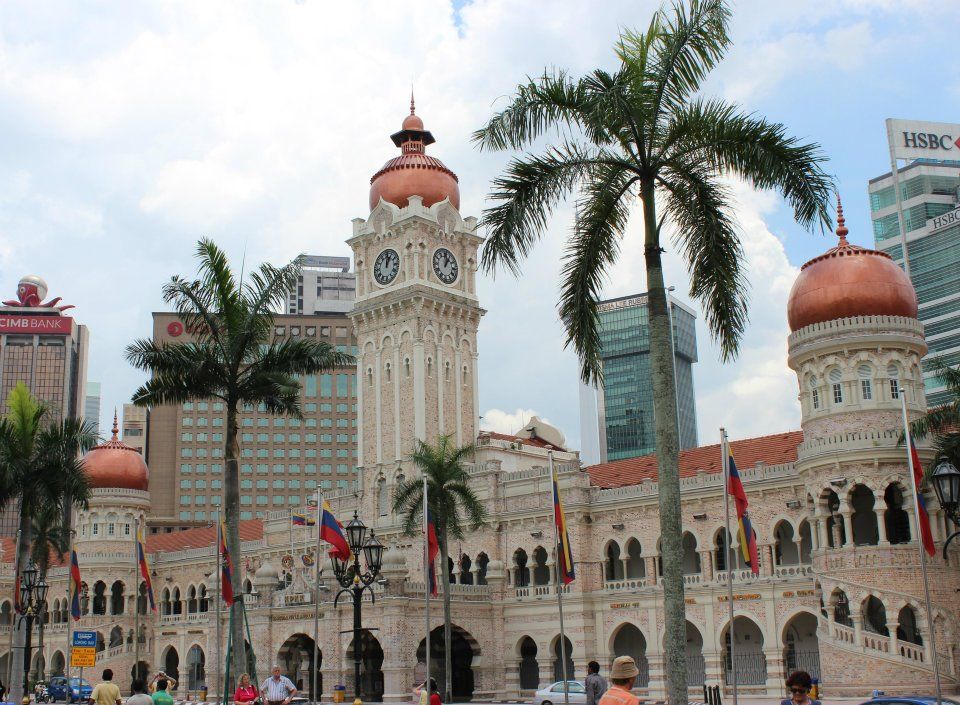
Sultan Abdul Samad Building, designed under C. E. Spooner's instructions

Spooner joined the Survey Department of Ceylon in 1876, and in the following year moved to the Ceylon Public Works Department where he stayed for 14 years. He was involved in many irrigation schemes and the construction of many important roads and other works in Ceylon.

In 1891, he was appointed State Engineer of the Selangor Public Works Department (PWD). During his time at the Selangor PWD, he had a major impact on the architectural landscape of Kuala Lumpur, as he was responsible for directing and advising the architects who designed many of the best known buildings of the city. He first proposed the construction of a building that would house the offices of the colonial government (later known as Sultan Abdul Samad Building), and was responsible for the construction of many other important colonial buildings of the period. He carried out a massive building programme; other buildings constructed under his direction included the Old Post Office, Town Hall, the High Court, Pudu Prison, and others. He was also responsible for many large public works, such as the construction of an 83-mile trunk road into Pahang, part of which traversed the mountains at a height of 2,700 feet.

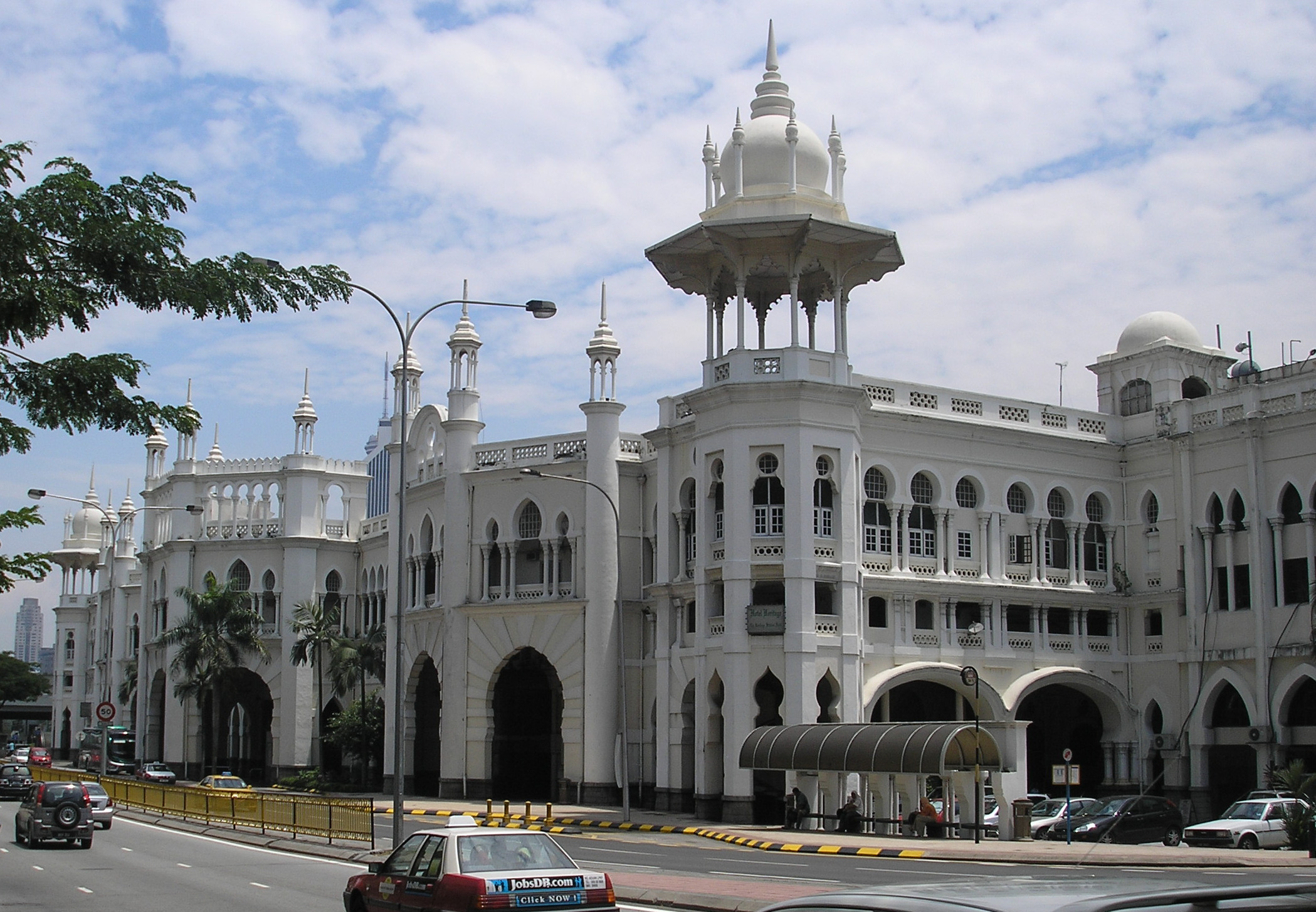
Kuala Lumpur Railway Station

In 1901, Spooner became General Manager of the Federated Malay States Railways. Under his guidance the state railway system was amalgamated, and the F.M.S Central Railways Offices in Kuala Lumpur (currently National Textile Museum) was completed. He also initiated the construction of Kuala Lumpur Railway Station. The amalgamation of the state railways was completed on 5 August 1903 by the establishment of inter-State connections. He also started the construction of the Johore State Railway, which would form the final link in the West Coast Line that connects Singapore with Penang. He was awarded the CMG in 1904.

Spooner died in Kuala Lumpur on 14 May 1909.

== Significance ==
Apart from his work in engineering and railways, Spooner was responsible for the creation of many buildings in Malaysia in a style of architecture that has been variously described as Indo-Saracenic, Neo-Mughal or Moorish, but which Spooner himself described as "Mahometan" (Islamic). The first building created in such a style under his instruction is the Sultan Abdul Samad Building. This kind of Indian-style Islamic architecture, which Spooner might have become familiar with when he was working in Ceylon, was previously not found in Malaya. Spooner however thought the style appropriate for the country. His preference then became the style for many important buildings constructed during his tenure at the PWD and FMS Railways, many of them designed by Arthur Benison Hubback. These buildings have since become an important part of the architectural heritage of Malaysia.
