= Hubbick =

Hubbick is a surname. Notable people with the surname include:

- Dave Hubbick (born 1960), English footballer
- Harry Hubbick (1910–1992), English footballer

== See also ==
- Hubback
