= Ubudiah Mosque =

Mosque in Kuala Kangsar, Perak, Malaysia

- Masjid Ubudiah مسجد العبودية
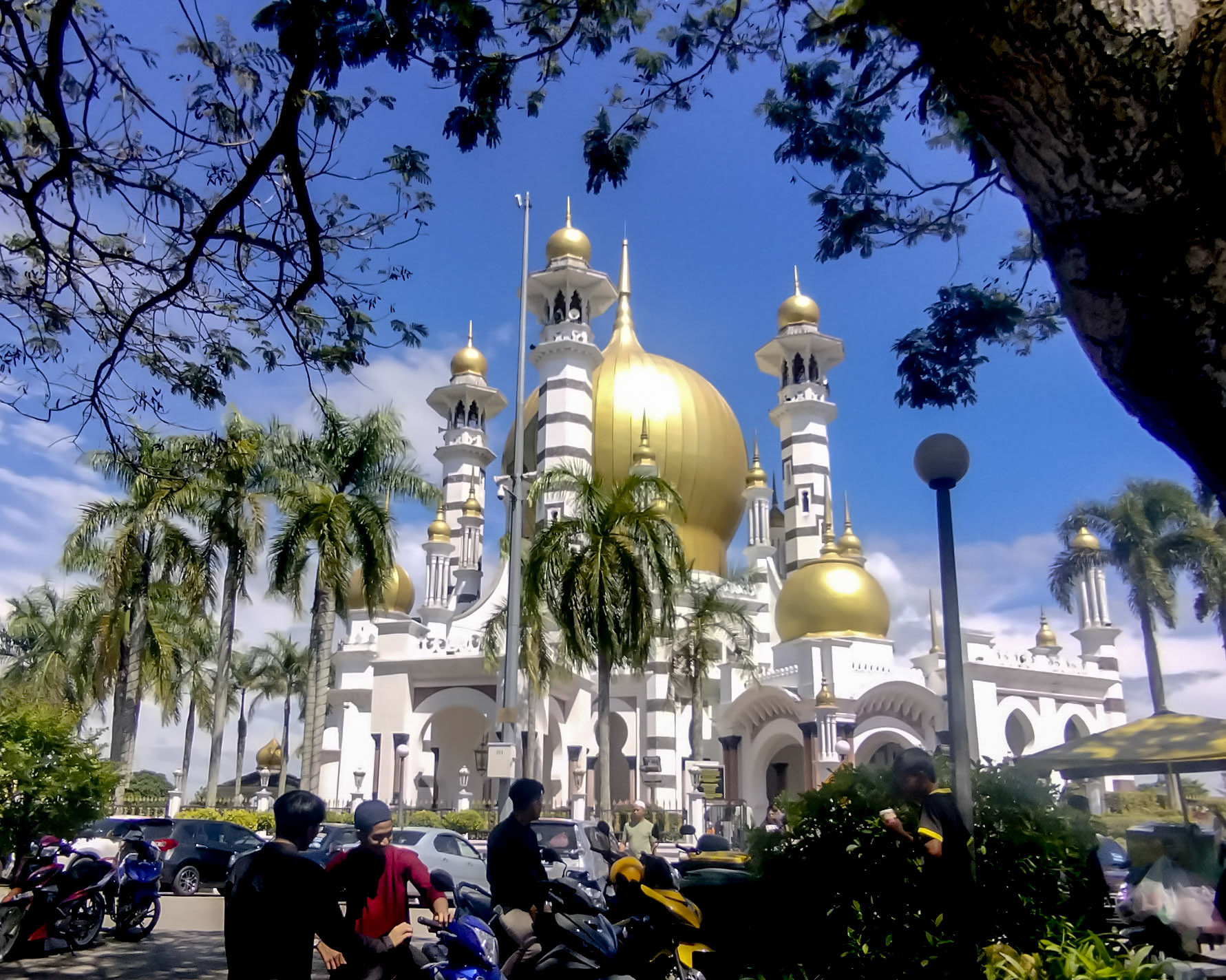
- The mosque after Friday prayer in 2023

- Location within Perak

Religion
- Affiliation: Islam
- Branch/tradition: Shafi'i Sunni
- Ecclesiastical or organizational status: Mosque
- Status: Active

Location
- Location: Kuala Kangsar, Perak
- Country: Malaysia
- Interactive map of Ubudiah Mosque
- Coordinates: 4°45′51″N 100°57′3″E

Architecture
- Architect: Arthur Benison Hubback
- Type: Mosque architecture
- Style: Islamic; Indo-Saracenic Revival
- Groundbreaking: 1913
- Completed: 1917

Specifications
- Dome: One (maybe more)
- Minaret: Four

The Ubudiah Mosque (Malay: Masjid Ubudiah) is a small Sunni mosque located in the royal town of Kuala Kangsar, Perak, Malaysia.

== History ==
The mosque is located beside the Royal Mausoleum on Jalan Istana at Bukit Chandan in Kuala Kangsar. The mosque was designed by Arthur Benison Hubback, who was also responsible for the design of the Ipoh railway station and the Kuala Lumpur railway station.

The mosque was built during the reign of the 28th Sultan of Perak Idris Shah I, who commissioned its construction as thanksgiving for his recovery from an illness that plagued him in his later years. The groundbreaking ceremony took place on 26 September 1913.

The construction of the mosque was interrupted several times, once when two elephants belonging to the sultan and Raja Chulan fought, ran over and damaged the Italian marble tiles. The outbreak of the First World War in Europe also affected its construction.

The mosque was finally completed in late 1917 at a total cost of $24,000 or RM200,000 – a considerable sum at that time. It was officially declared open by Sultan Abdul Jalil, successor to Sultan Idris who had died during its construction. The mosque is now a symbol of pride for the people of the state of Perak.

The mosque was renovated in 2003.

== Architecture ==
Its architecture is in the Indo-Saracenic Revival style. It has a central golden dome, and four minarets as well as turrets topped with smaller golden domes. Italian marble was used to add bands of darker colour to the white building. The Makam Al-Ghufran or Perak royal mausoleum is located near the mosque.

== Gallery ==
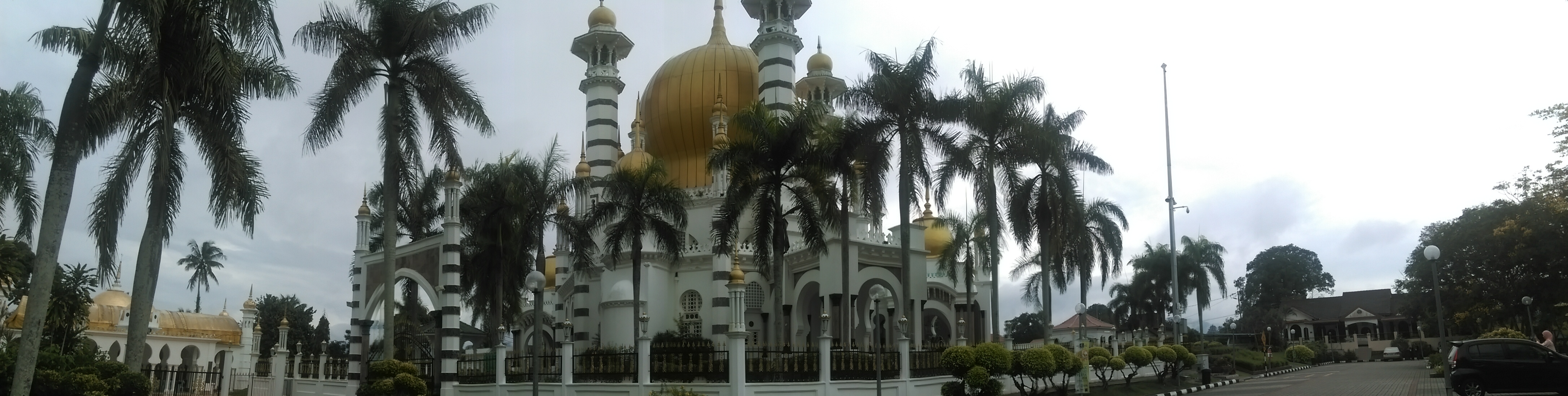
The panorama view of the mosque

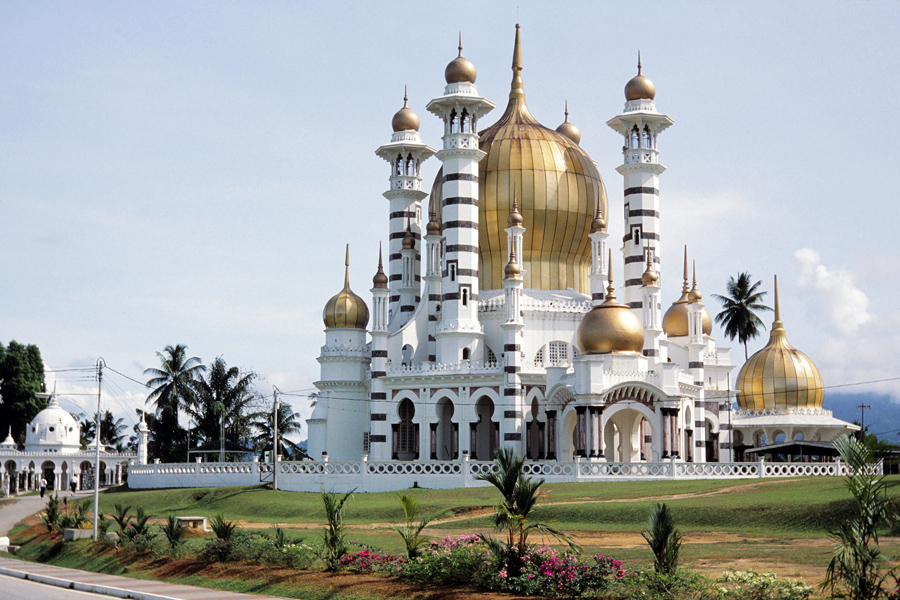
The mosque, c. 1990s

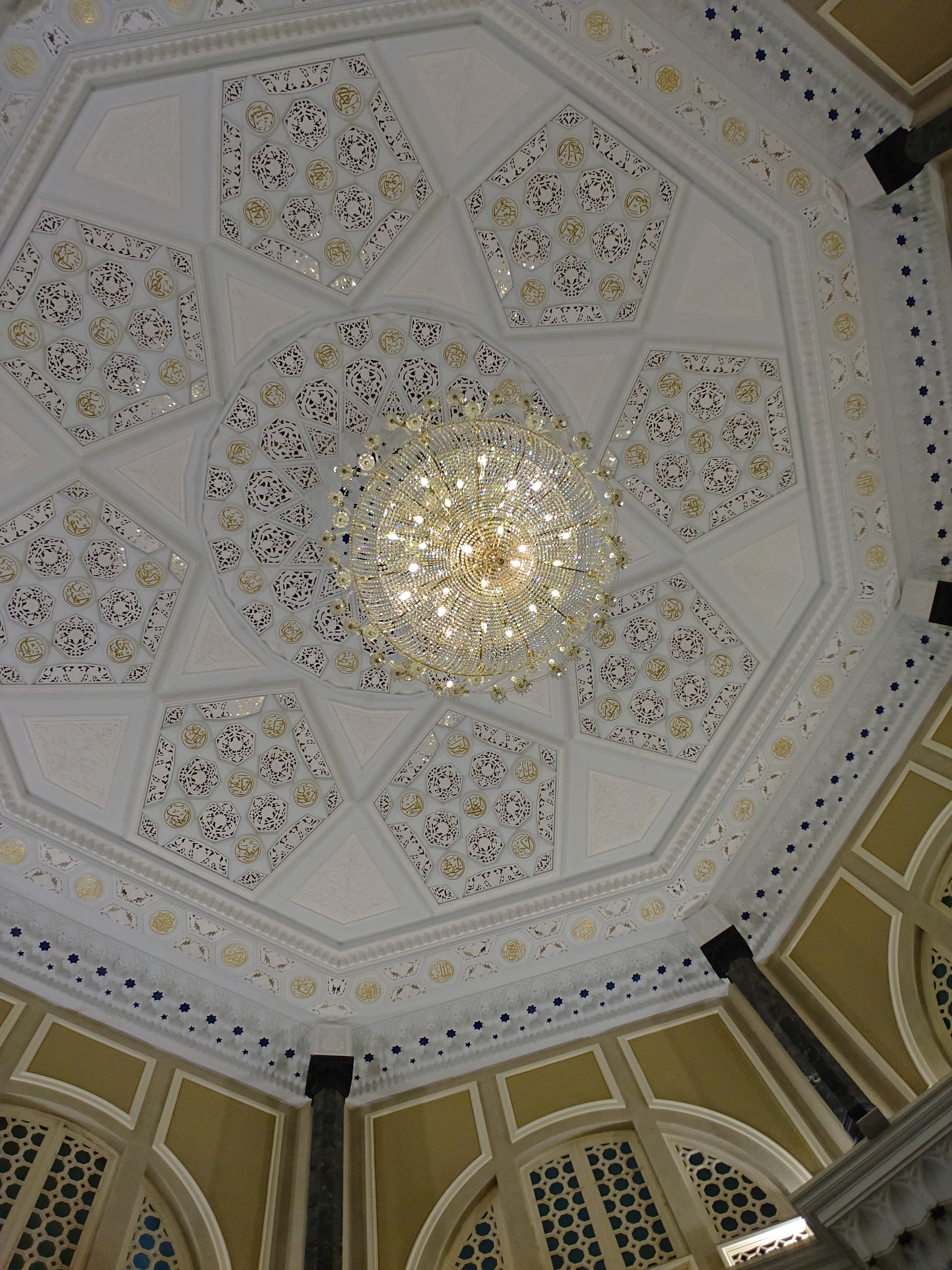
The interior dome of the mosque

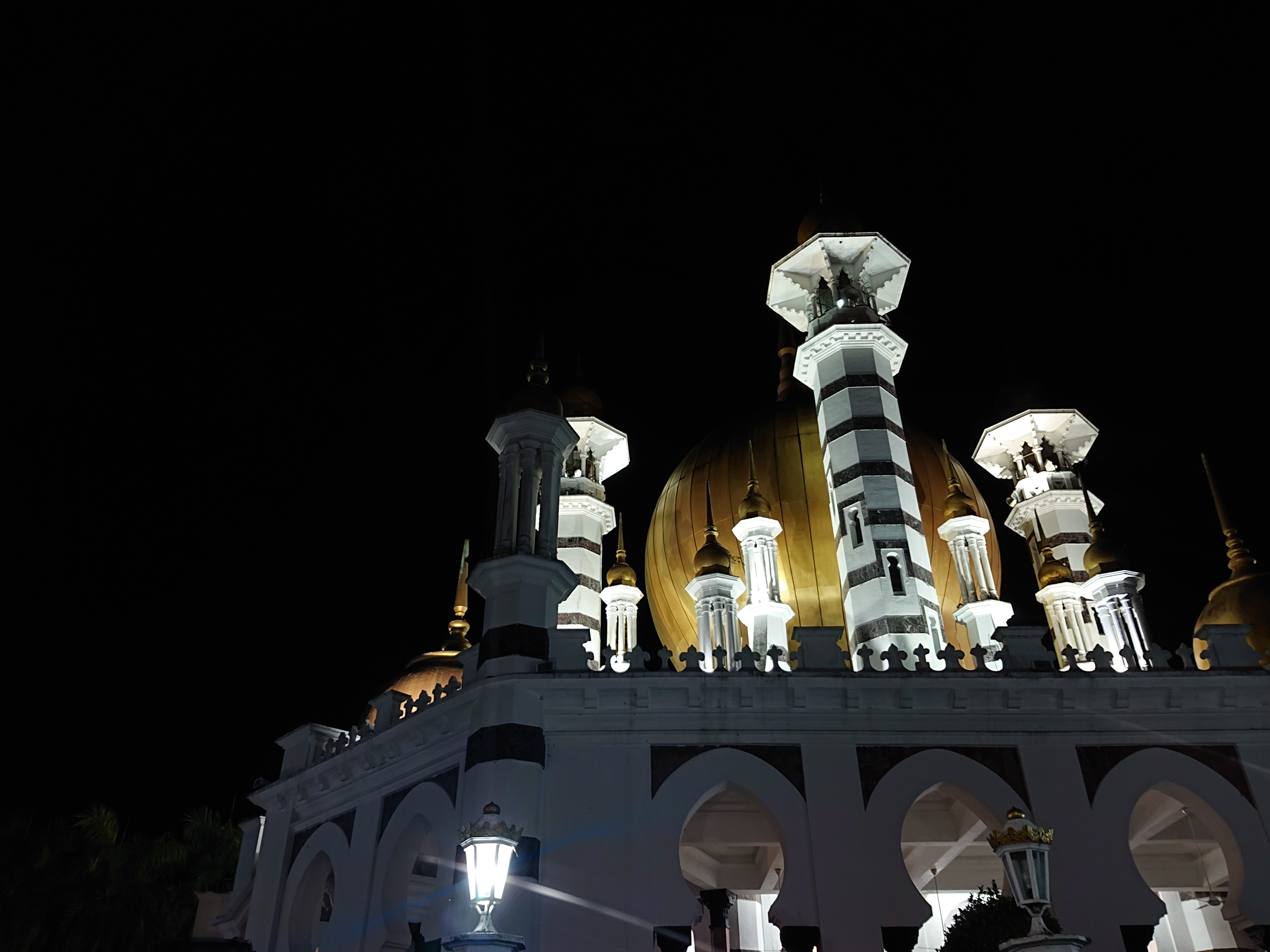
The mosque at night

== See also ==
- Islam in Malaysia
- List of mosques in Malaysia
