= Thomas de Multon Lee Braddell =

British barrister and colonial judge (1856-1927)

Sir Thomas de Multon Lee Braddell
- Born: 25 November 1856; Province Wellesley
- Died: January 1927 (aged 71)
- Education: Worcester College, Oxford
- Occupation: Barrister
- Years active: 1879-1917
- Spouse: Violet Ida Nassau Kirby
- Children: Sir Roland Braddell
- Father: Sir Thomas Braddell

Sir Thomas de Multon Lee Braddell (25 November 1856 – January 1927) was a barrister and colonial judge.

== Early life and education ==
Son of Sir Thomas Braddell, first Attorney General of the Straits Settlements (1867-1882), Thomas de Multon Lee Braddell was born in Province Wellesley on 25 November 1856. He was educated at Brighton College, and Worcester College, Oxford. In 1879 he was called to the bar of the Inner Temple.

== Career ==
In 1879, Braddell went to Singapore to join his father's law firm, and in the following year was admitted to the local bar. In 1883, he founded the firm Braddell Brothers with his brother Robert Braddell, today the second-oldest law firm in Singapore. Except in 1898, when he briefly acted as Attorney General, he continued in private practice until 1907 when he was appointed Puisne Judge, and in 1911, following his father, he was appointed Attorney General.

In 1913, he went to Kuala Lumpur as Chief Judicial Commissioner of the Federated Malay States. In 1915, he oversaw the opening of the new Supreme Court Building. One of his most notable judgments was in the Paniker case (1915) which caused dismay in the rubber industry when he decided that the appellant had not acted unlawfully when he induced rubber workers to leave their employer for better conditions. He retired to England in 1917.

== Personal life and death ==
Braddell married Violet Ida Nassau Kirby. Their eldest son, Roland Braddell, was a lawyer and joint editor of the book One Hundred Years of Singapore (1921). He was an enthusiastic Freemason who occupied the offices of Master of the Lodge of St George and First Master of Read Lodge, Kuala Lumpur. He died in England in January 1927, aged 71.

== Honours ==
Braddell was appointed a Knight Bachelor in 1914.
