= Former Supreme Court, Kuala Lumpur =

1915 building in Kuala Lumpur, Malaysia

Coordinates: 3°08′59″N 101°41′43″E

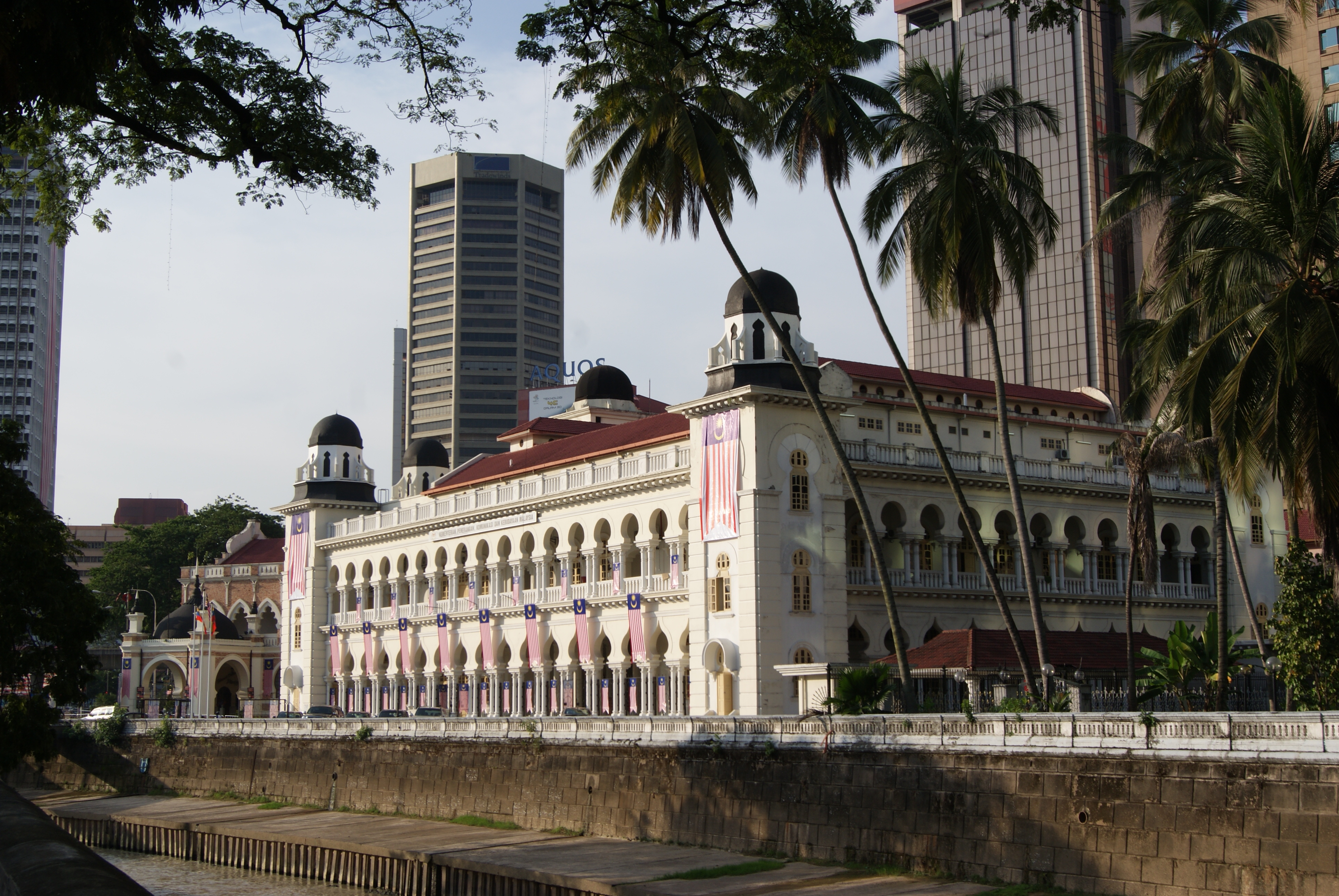
- Alternative names: Old High Court

General information
- Type: Court house
- Architectural style: Indo-Saracenic
- Location: Jalan Raja, Kuala Lumpur City Centre, Kuala Lumpur, Malaysia
- Construction started: June 1912
- Opened: 1 May 1915
- Cost: $208,500 Straits Dollars

Technical details
- Floor count: 2

Design and construction
- Architect: Arthur Benison Hubback
- Main contractor: Ang Seng, Kuala Lumpur

The Former Supreme Court Building is the former court house of the Supreme Court of the Federated Malay States in Kuala Lumpur, Malaysia. It was opened in 1915 when the Supreme Court was relocated from Court Hill.

== History ==
Work commenced on the Supreme Court Building in June 1912 after the old courts situated on Court Hill became inadequate due to the rapid increase in the business of the Court, and took two years and nine months to complete. It was designed by Government architect, Arthur Benison Hubback, and built at a cost of $208,500 Straits Dollars. The contractor was Ang Seng who was the contractor for the nearby Government Offices, now the Sultan Abdul Samad Building.

The building was opened by High Commissioner for the Federated Malay States, Sir Arthur Young at a ceremony held on 1 May 1915, in the presence of the Chief Judicial Commissioner Thomas Braddell, judges, court officials and members of the Bar.

On 2 December 1992, a fire broke out and destroyed several courtrooms in the building, which housed the criminal division of the High Court and the Sessions Court. The High Court's criminal division was temporarily moved to the nearby Sultan Abdul Samad Building, while the Sessions Court was temporary moved to the Jalan Duta magistrate court.

The Federal Court and the Court of Appeal which had occupied the nearby Sultan Abdul Samad Building was relocated to the Palace of Justice in Putrajaya in 2003.

In 2020, the Former Supreme Court Building was occupied by the Ministry of Tourism and Culture, while a spokesperson for Kuala Lumpur City Hall (DBKL) said that it had assumed responsibility for the maintenance of the building which, after much neglect, was in need of urgent maintenance.

== Description ==
The Former Supreme Court Building situated in Jalan Raja, next to Independence Square, was constructed in the Indo-Saracenic style similar to the Sultan Abdul Samad Building opened in 1897.

The two-storey building has four towers at each corner surmounted by domes which are linked by a double arcade of columns and arches which surround the building. The public entrance on the Gombak River side leads to an open courtyard in the centre of the building which has a double staircase to the courts situated on the upper floor.

The ground floor consisted of four offices, each 92 feet by 32 feet, the Registrar's Office, with a counter and two strongrooms. At the back of the ground floor were placed the cells which had access to the courts by a private staircase so prisoners could be brought to the dock without being seen by the public.

The upper floor had a library, and two courtrooms, each 70 feet by 32 feet, with a gallery to accommodate the public and the press. Leading from each court were the judges' chambers, robing rooms and witnesses' waiting rooms. The judges had their own entrance, and the towers were used as private tiffin rooms.

== See also ==
- Sultan Abdul Samad Building
- Federated Malay States Survey Office
- Independence Square
- Jamek Mosque
