= William Graeme St. Clair =

Singaporean newspaperman

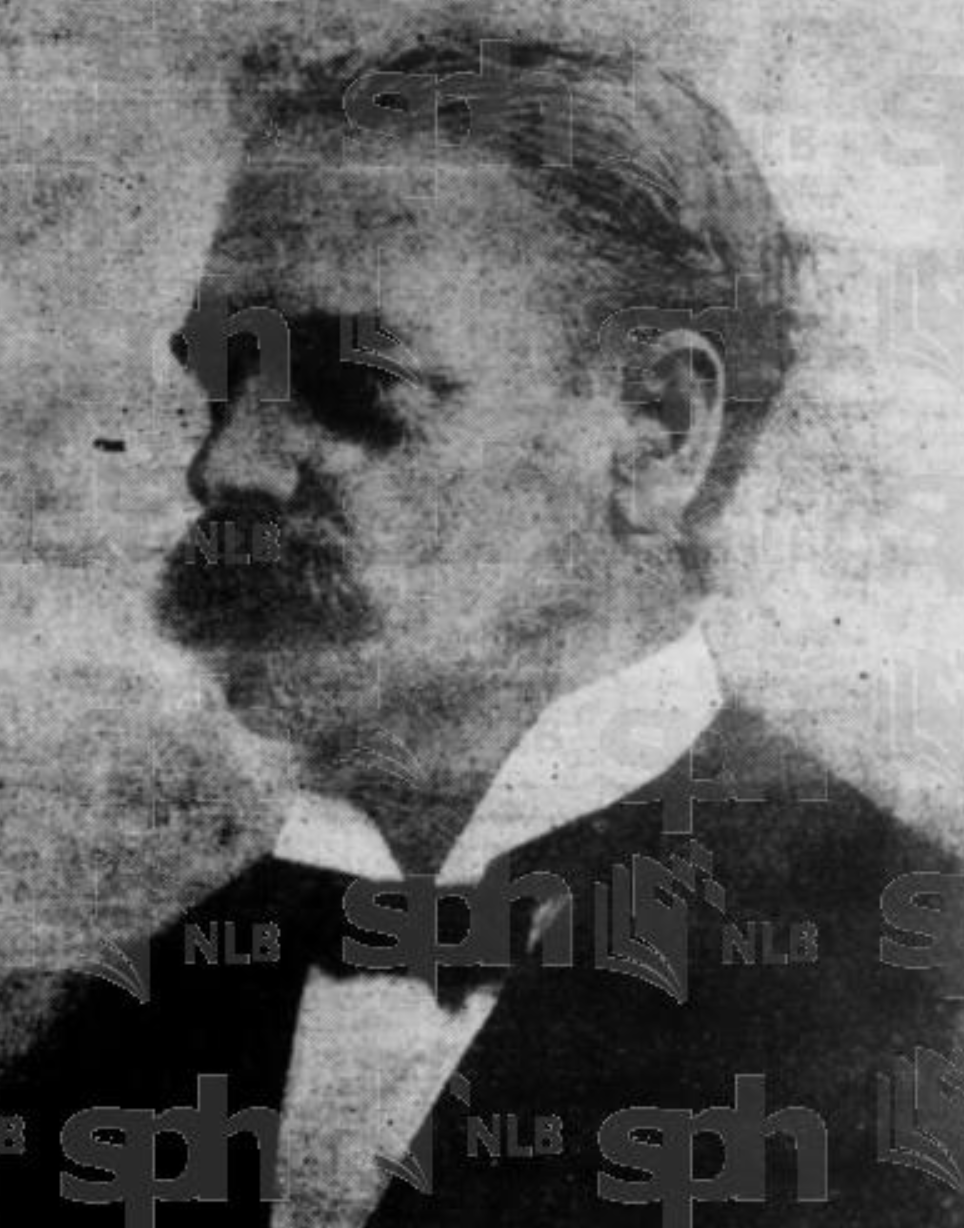
St. Clair

William Graeme St. Clair (27 March 1849 — 29 March 1930) was the editor of The Singapore Free Press, the founder and the conductor of the Singapore Philharmonic Society and a major with the Singapore Voluntary Artillery.

== Early life ==
St. Clair was born in Scotland on 27 March 1849. He attended the Royal High School in Edinburgh and the University of Edinburgh.

== Career ==
In 1874, St. Clair was appointed the headmaster of the Moulmein Town School in Myanmar.

He became the editor of The Singapore Free Press after arriving in Singapore in February 1887. In 1895, he and Walter Makepeace became the proprietors of the newspaper. In 1909, he represented British Malaya at the Imperial Press Conference in London. He was known as the "doyen of the press of the Straits Settlements".

In 1887, he revived the Singapore Volunteer Corps as the Singapore Volunteer Artillery. From July to November 1892, he served as the Acting Commissioner of the 1st Perak Sikhs of the Pahang Expeditionary Force during the Pahang Uprising. He became the Chief Transport and Commmisariat Officer to the expedition. By 1916, he had achieved the rank of major and was the commanding officer of the Singapore Voluntary Artillery.

He founded the Singapore Philharmonic Society in March 1891, and served as the society's conductor. In 1893, he replaced John Finlayson as the society's president. The society ceased to function after his retirement in 1916. He also arranged the Burmese song Kaya Than for military bands. The arrangement became the Burmese National Anthem in 1886 during the British occupation of Upper Burma.

St. Clair retired in March 1916, and left Singapore on 30 March. After retiring, he settled in Colombo, Sri Lanka.

== Personal life and death ==
St. Clair was twice married.

He died on 29 March 1930.
