= Roland Braddell =

British historian and colonial advisor (1880–1966)

Sir Roland St. John Braddell (20 December 1880 – 15 November 1966) was a historian and colonial adviser in British Malaya. He was considered "one of Malaya's foremost legal authorities".

== Early life ==
Roland St. John Braddell was born in Singapore in 1880. His father, Thomas de Multon Lee Braddell, had served as Attorney-General of Singapore, as had his father before him.

He was educated at King's School, Canterbury, and then Worcester College, Oxford. He was called to the bar in 1905.

== Writing career ==
Braddell wrote several books on the history of Malaya, as well as a two-volume legal work called Laws of the Straits Settlements and a book titled Gaming Laws. Alongside this, he published several essays concerning the legal status of the Federated Malay States from a series of lectures he had given to the Singapore Rotary Club. He worked as an editor on One Hundred Years of Singapore with Walter Makepeace and Gilbert Brooke. Alongside editing the book, he contributed several chapters to it.

In 1934, he published The Lights of Singapore, an anecdotal work on life in the region.

== Educational career ==
Braddell served as Chairman for the Council of the University of Malaya in Singapore from 1949. He was later knighted for his work in this position, and also granted the degree of Honorary Doctor of Letters.

Following his retirement from the university in 1951, he returned to Kuala Lumpur. In 1953, alongside R. G. D. Allen, Braddell was appointed to "submit a scheme of courses and organisation for consideration by Senate and Council" at the University of Malaya. In March 1955, they published the Braddell-Allen Report and recommended the creation of two new departments for Social Sciences and Law. Braddell proposed a four-year programme with various elements to it, and consulted with legal experts like the Bar Committee of Singapore over what to include. He also suggested that a Professor of Law be hired by the university to develop a curriculumm, and Lionel Astor Sheridan was hired soon after.

He was a Life Fellow of The Asiatic Society since 1934, and served as President of its Malayan branch for several years.

== Colonial career ==
Braddell served as Municipal Commissioner in Singapore for several years during World War I, and later became a member of the Housing Commission and the Executive Council.

From 1932 to 1940, he was a Constitutional Advisor and member of the Executive Council to the Sultan of Johore. Following World War II, he advised the United Malays National Organisation (UMNO) and the monarchies of Malaysia.

== Personal life ==
Braddell died on 15 November 1966.
