= Federated Malay States Survey Office =

Early 20th century building in Kuala Lumpur, Malaysia

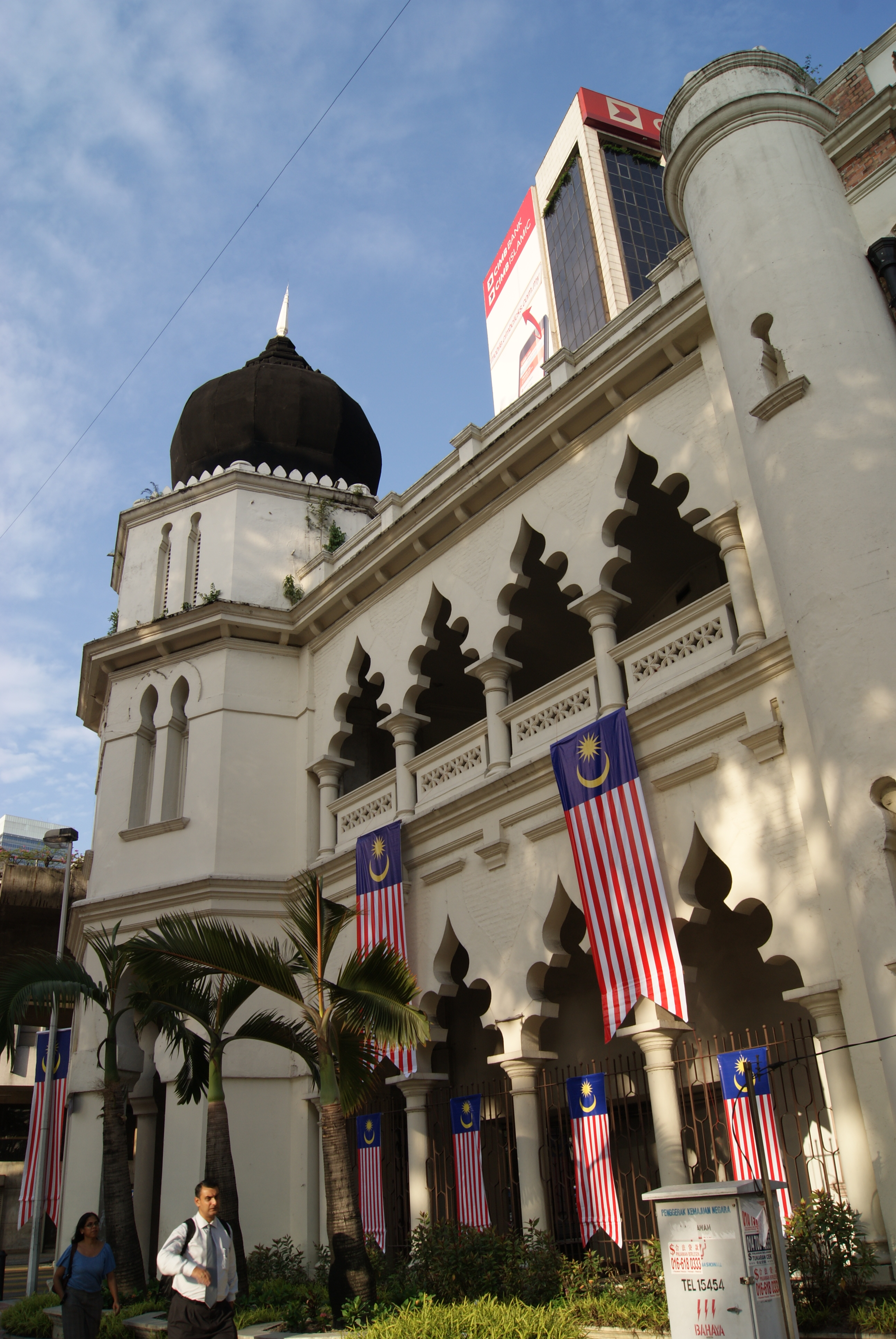
- Interactive map of the Federated Malay States Survey Office area
- Alternative names: Old Survey Department building

General information
- Status: Vacant
- Architectural style: Indo-Saracenic
- Location: Jalan Tun Perak, Kuala Lumpur, Malaysia
- Coordinates: 3°09′01″N 101°41′44″E
- Construction started: August 1909
- Completed: Late 1910
- Opened: Early 1911

Technical details
- Floor count: 2

Design and construction
- Architect: Arthur Benison Hubback
- Main contractor: Dunstan A. Aeria

The Federated Malay States Survey Office is an early 20th-century building situated in Jalan Tun Perak, Kuala Lumpur, Malaysia. It was built in 1910 to accommodate the Survey Department of the Federated Malay States, which was under British colonial administration.

== History ==
The Survey Department was founded in the early 20th century to carry out surveys of Malaya and produce detailed maps. It was divided into Trigonometrical, Topographical and Revenue Survey Branches, and in 1909 the cost of the department to the government was over $1 million.

In 1909, Arthur Benison Hubback was commissioned to design a building for the Survey Department, and construction work began in August 1909. Construction was carried out by Dunstan A. Aeria under a contract for $116,672 and completed in late 1910. Occupation of the building commenced in early 1911 when the Trigonometrical Branch was transferred from Taiping. Later, the building was used by the judiciary and housed the sessions and the magistrate courts.

On 2 December 1992, a fire broke out in the High Court building adjacent to the main FMS Survey Department building. The fire caused extensive damage to the High Court complex and several courtrooms were destroyed.

== Description ==
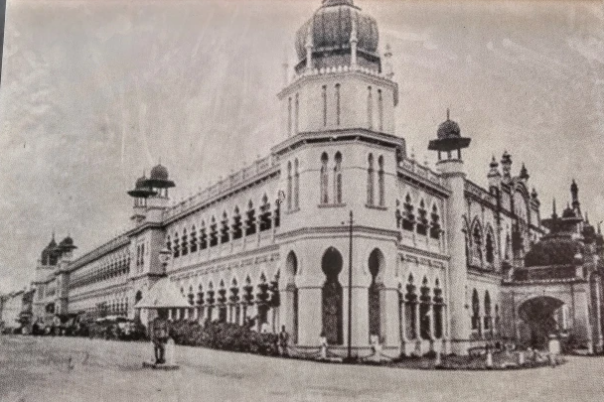
Building soon after completion in 1910

Hubback's Indo-Saracenic design was similar to other buildings which he had previously designed in Kuala Lumpur such as the nearby former Municipal Office and Town Hall and Jamek Mosque. Its facade features a 400 foot long colonnade on both floors with distinctive 'cinquefoil' (five-leafed clover) arches, terminated at each end by two 80 foot high octagonal towers surmounted by onion shaped domes of copper.

After the building was vacated around 2000, decay and deterioration to the structure was reported. In 2016, one of the dome's spires fell down, and in 2024 significant damage occurred when parts of the ceiling and wall collapsed prompting the prime minister to direct the carrying out of refurbishment works. The building is designated as a heritage site under the National Heritage Act 2005.

== See also ==
- Sultan Abdul Samad Building
- Former Supreme Court, Kuala Lumpur
- Independence Square
- Jamek Mosque
