= Walter Makepeace =

Singaporean journalist

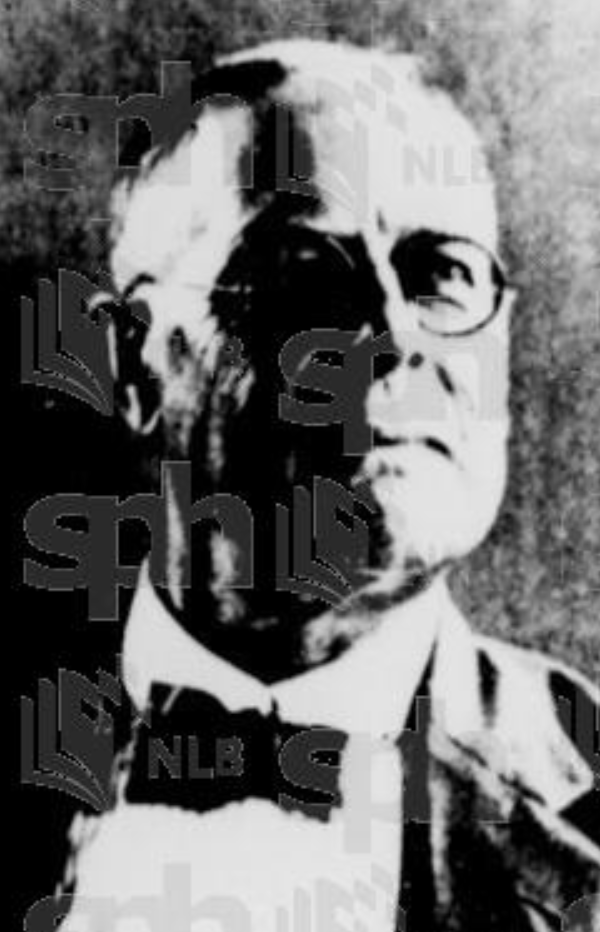
Makepeace in 1926

Walter Makepeace (22 December 1859 – 1941) was a journalist, the editor of The Singapore Free Press and a co-editor of One Hundred Years of Singapore.

== Early life and education ==
Makepeace was born in Coventry, England on 22 December 1859. He attended the Birmingham and Midland Institute and later the Saltry College in Birmingham.

== Career ==
Makepeace arrived in British Malaya in 1884 and became a schoolmaster with the education department of the Straits Settlements and a court reporter. In 1887, he was asked to go to Singapore to serve as the reporter of the Legislative Council of the Straits Settlements for no extra pay. For this reason, he chose to leave government service, after which he was employed at The Singapore Free Press as the paper's assistant editor. He was then appointed the paper's legislative correspondent. He enlisted in the Singapore Volunteer Corps in 1888, eventually rising to the rank of captain and honorary major. Between 1890 and the 1920s he served as the secretary and the treasurer Masters and Mates' Association and the Singapore Merchant Guild Association. In 1895, he and William Graeme St. Clair became joint proprietors of the paper, while Makepeace was named the paper's business chief. In 1906, he became the paper's joint proprietor and editor along with Reginald Downing Davies. He obtained the first Linotype machine in British Malaya for the paper, which was installed above the paper's premises above the Robinsons Department Store. He was also a correspondent for Reuters and the Paris edition of the New York Herald.

Makepeace retired from the Singapore Volunteer Corps in 1914 but remained on the reserve list, and was recalled the following year to command 200 special constables in the 1915 Singapore Mutiny. In 1919, he was appointed the vice-president of the Straits Settlements Association, which he was a member of. He officially retired from the Singapore Volunteer Corps in 1920. He, Gilbert E. Brooke and Roland Braddell became the co-editors of One Hundred Years of Singapore, which was commissioned by the Singapore Centenary Committee in 1918 and published in 1921. He was a Freemason and was the Worshipful Master of the Zetland in the East Masonic lodge in 1894 and a district Grand Master in 1919. He was a committee member of the Raffles Library and Museum, a vice-president, honorary secretary and librarian of the Straits Branch of the Royal Asiatic Society, the captain and the president of the Singapore Swimming Club, and a member of the Straits Merchants Service Guild, the Singapore Cycling Club and the Chess Club. He retired from The Singapore Free Press in 1926.

== Personal life and death ==
Makepeace was married and had one son and two daughters. After he retired, he and his family settled in Henleaze, Bristol. He died in 1941.

Makepeace Road is named after him.

== Bibliography ==
- One Hundred Years of Singapore: Being Some Account of the Capital of the Straits Settlements from Its Foundation by Sir Stamford Raffles on the 6th February 1819 to the 6th February 1919 (1921)
