= A. B. Hubback =

British Army officer and architect

Brigadier-General A. B. Hubback CMG DSO FRIBA
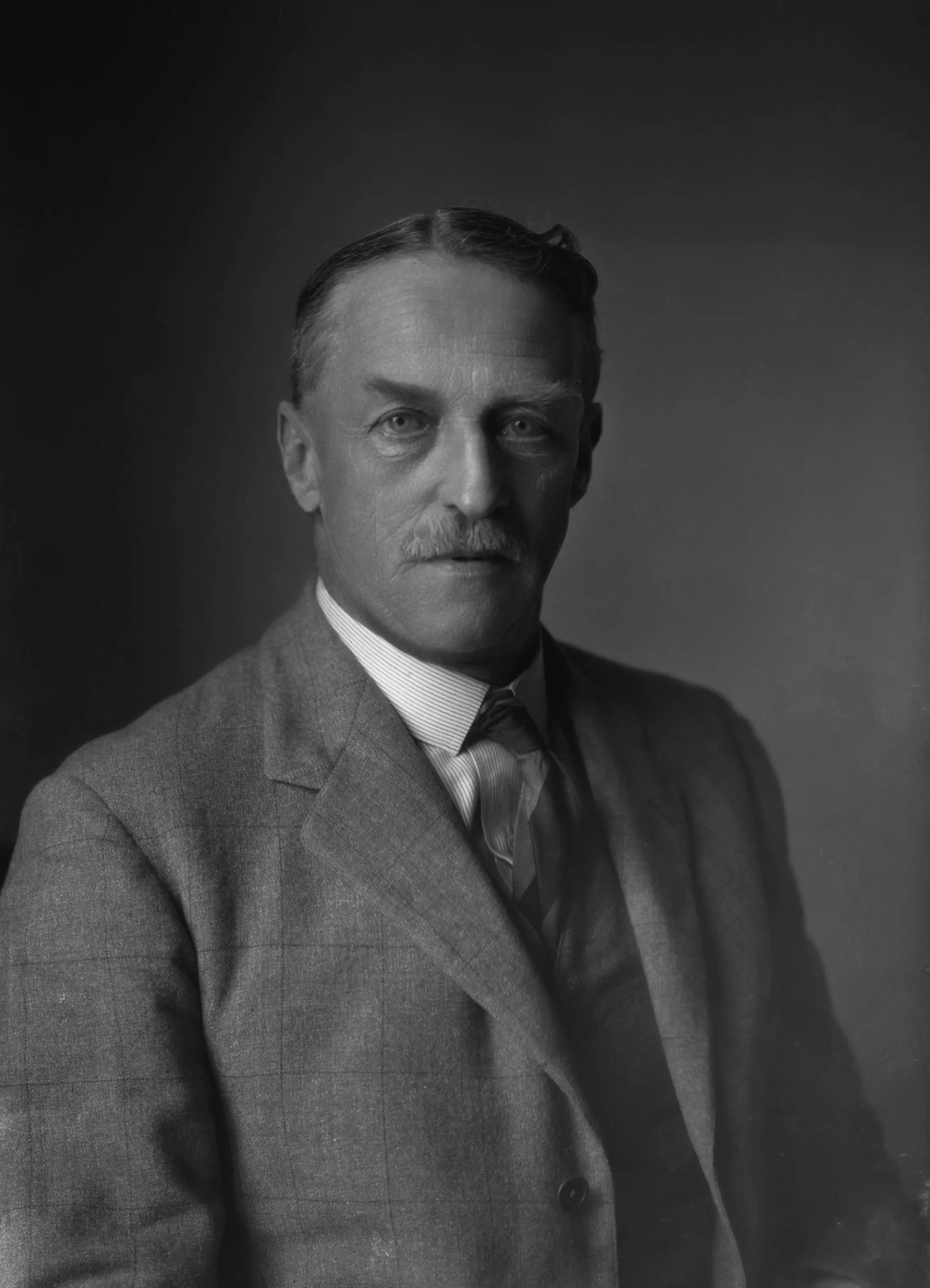
- Hubback in 1927
- Born: Arthur Benison Hubback; 13 April 1871; Liverpool, England
- Died: 8 May 1948 (aged 77); Broxbourne, Hertfordshire, England
- Occupation: Architect

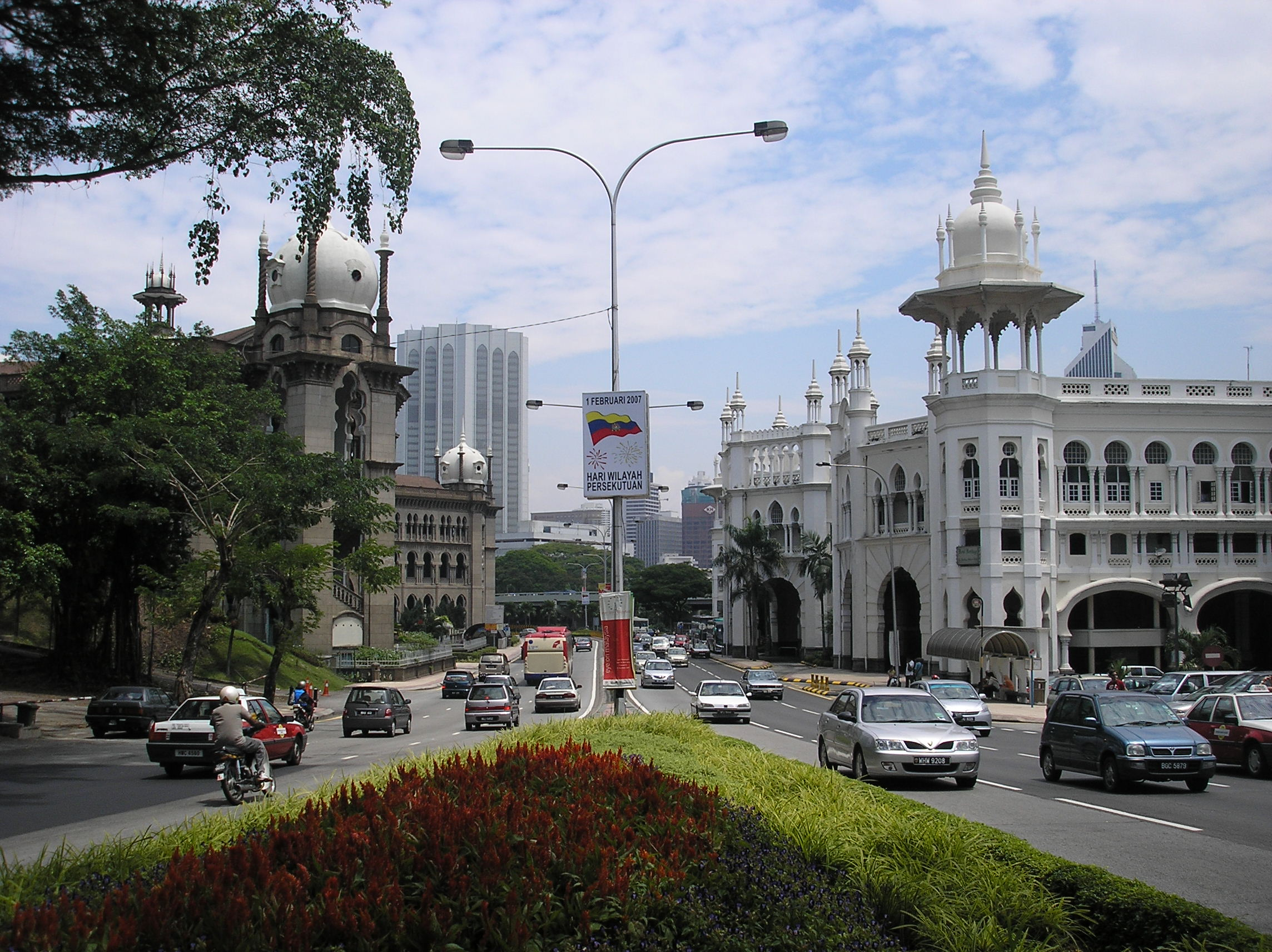
Kuala Lumpur Railway Station (right) and Malay Railway Administration Building (left), both by Hubback

Arthur Benison Hubback CMG DSO FRIBA (13 April 1871 – 8 May 1948) was a British Army officer and architect who designed several important buildings in British Malaya, in both Indo-Saracenic architecture and European "Wrenaissance" styles. Major works credited to him include Kuala Lumpur railway station, Ubudiah Mosque, Jamek Mosque, National Textile Museum, Panggung Bandaraya DBKL, Ipoh railway station, and Kowloon railway station.

After an English training in Liverpool, he arrived in Malaya in 1895, and by 1900 was appointed chief government architect of the British-run Federated Malay States, returning to Britain in 1914 at the start of World War I, though he did not officially resign until 1917. Reversing the pattern of many British architects of the British Raj in India, he was an architect who became a soldier, commanding troops in France, and remaining in the army until his retirement in 1924. He was active in sports, especially football and cricket. Hubback was promoted to brigadier general during his career in the British army.

== Early life ==
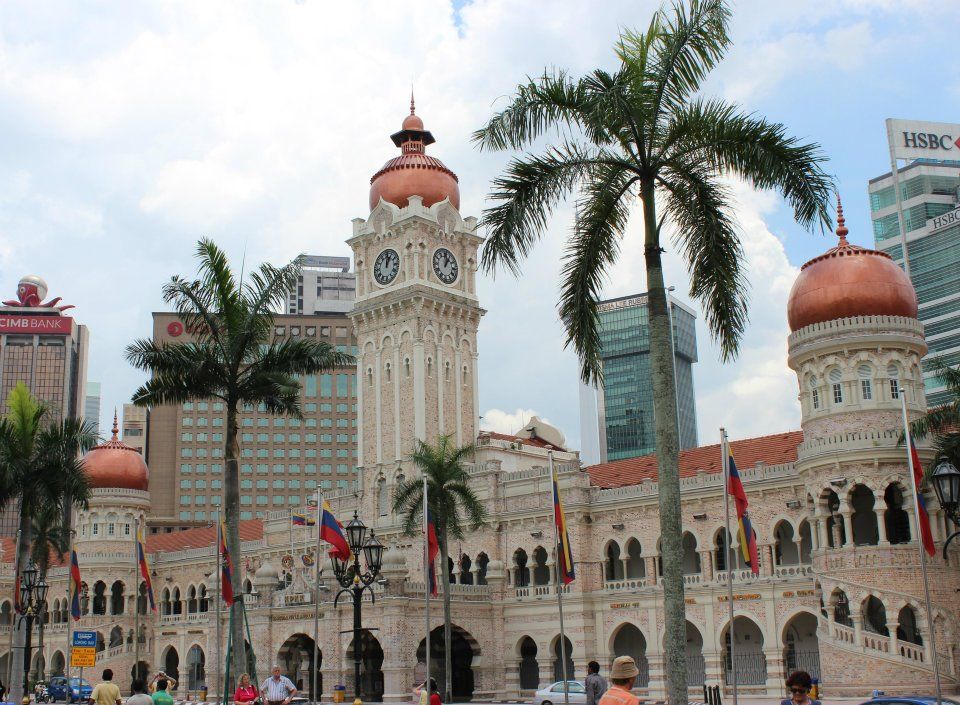
Sultan Abdul Samad Building, first major work in Malaya A. B. Hubback was involved in

Arthur Hubback was born at 74 Rodney Street, Liverpool, England, son of Joseph Hubback (1814–1882), who was Mayor of Liverpool in 1870 and a merchant, and Georgina Hubback (née Benison and widow of Captain Allan Eliott Lockhart). Arthur attended Fettes College, Edinburgh, and then started work as an apprentice for the city architect in Liverpool, Thomas Shelmerdine.

== Career in architecture ==
In 1895, Hubback moved to Malaya and became the chief draughtsman of Selangor public works department, which was then working on the building of government offices now known as Sultan Abdul Samad Building. The Sultan Abdul Samad Building was originally designed by A.C. Norman and R. A. J. Bidwell in a Classic Renaissance style, but Norman's plan was then reworked on by Bidwell in an Indo-Saracenic or Moorish style. After Bidwell left, Hubback also worked on the building. After the building was completed in 1897, he worked in private practice for a few years, before returning to public work in 1901.

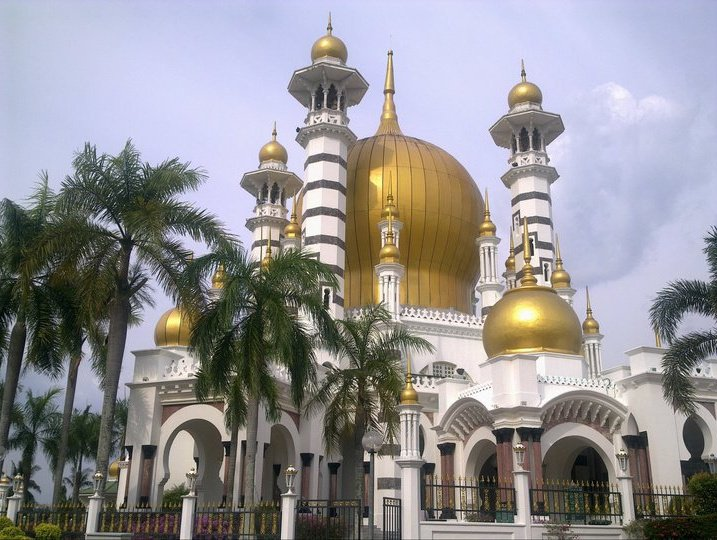
Ubudiah Mosque, Kuala Kangsar

From then until the outbreak of World War I was a period of great construction projects, and he worked on buildings in Malaya and Hong Kong, from mosques to railway stations. An important work designed by Hubback is the Kuala Lumpur railway station. Among other major works he designed are the Jamek Mosque, Kowloon railway station, and Ipoh railway station. He designed at least 25 buildings in Malaya, and many of these are now considered an important part of the architectural heritage of Malaysia.

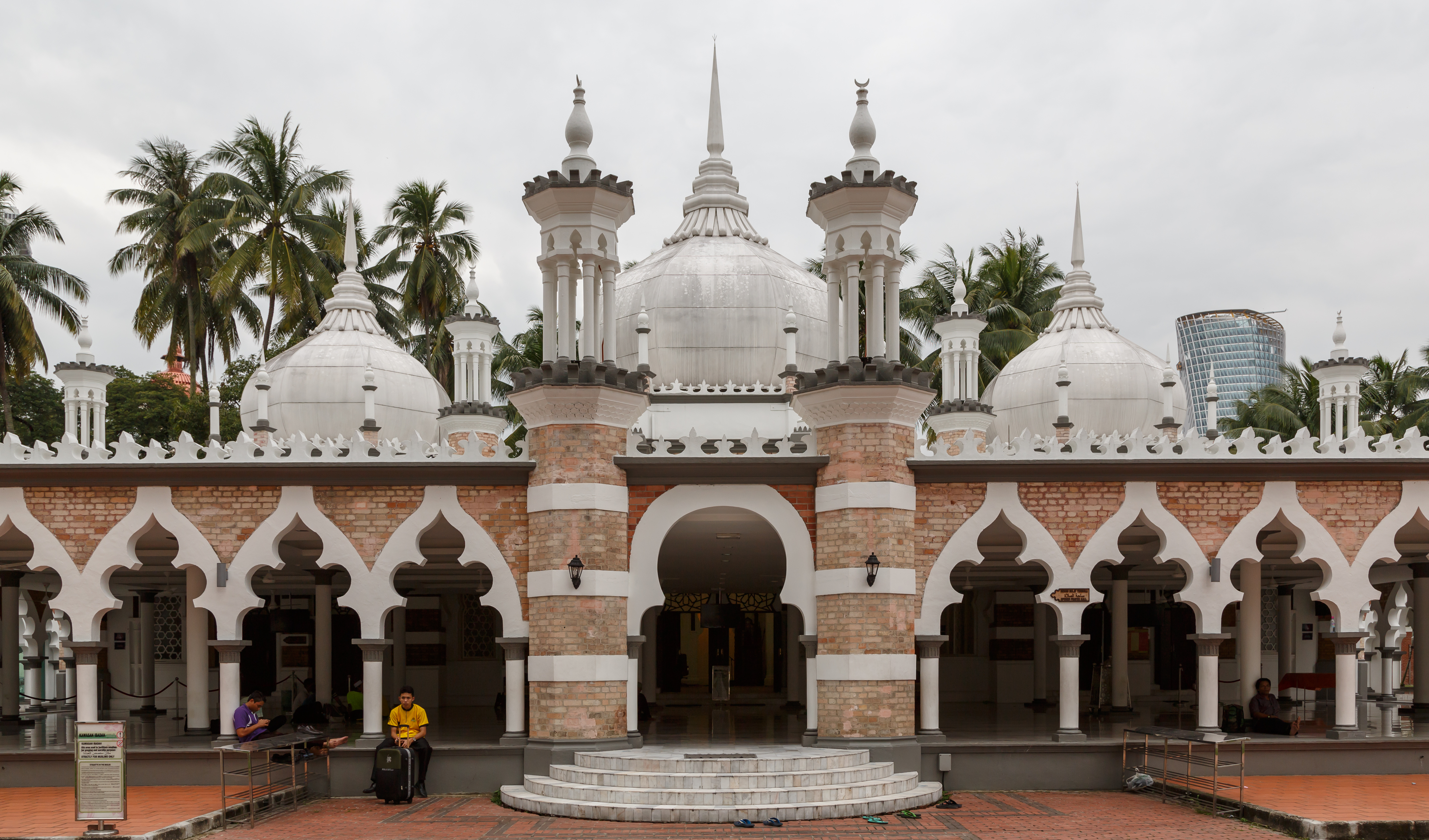
Jamek Mosque

He returned to England in 1914 and did not design any further buildings in Malaya, although some of his buildings were not completed until later.

== Military service ==
Hubback took charge of the Federated Malay States Volunteer Rifles (M.S.V.R.) in 1907. He was appointed as a major in the M.S.V.R. in 1910 and he was in command of the Federated Malay States Contingent to George V's coronation in 1911. He was then promoted to lieutenant colonel in the M.S.V.R. in 1912.

In 1914, at the start of World War I, he became a major in the 19th Battalion, London Regiment (St Pancras), a Territorial Force (TF) unit. In 1915, he was the lieutenant colonel commanding the 20th Battalion, London Regiment (Blackheath and Woolwich) (TF), in 47th (1/2nd London) Division of the British Expeditionary Force on the Western Front. He commanded the 20th Bn at the Battle of Loos, in which it captured the Chalk Pit, and Hubback had to take over command of 19th Bn as well. He was promoted to Brigadier-General in command of 2nd Brigade in 1st Division on 10 March 1916, and was wounded on the First day on the Somme. He returned to command 118th Brigade of 39th Division on 3 April 1918. The division had suffered so badly during the German spring offensive of March that it had been reduced to a single composite brigade, which Hubback commanded during the Battle of the Lys. Afterwards the division was reduced to a training organisation, and Hubback acted as divisional commander from 31 August to 10 September. On 21 October he transferred to 63rd Brigade in 37th Division and commanded it during the final battles of the war. During the war he was mentioned in dispatches six times, was awarded a Companionship of the Order of St Michael and St George, and won the Distinguished Service Order.

AfterF the war he continued in the Territorial Army, commanding the 5th London Brigade from 1920 to 1924. He then retired, but attempted to rejoin at the outbreak of the Second World War and was turned down due to his age. He ran instead the Soldiers', Sailors' and Airmen's Family Association in Hertfordshire to look after the families of the armed forces.

== Family ==
Hubback married Margaret Rose Frances (Daisy) Voules, the sister of a colleague, in 1901 and they had two children, a son (Arthur Gordon Voules Hubback, R.N.) and a daughter (Yvonne Hubback).

He had two brothers. Theodore Rathbone Hubback joined Arthur in Malaya, and was a civil engineer and contractor, as well as working for a while as a rubber planter, and after early adventures as a big game hunter became a conservationist and author. George Clay Hubback was bishop of Assam and of Calcutta.

He died in Broxbourne, Hertfordshire, on 8 May 1948 of heart failure.

== Buildings ==
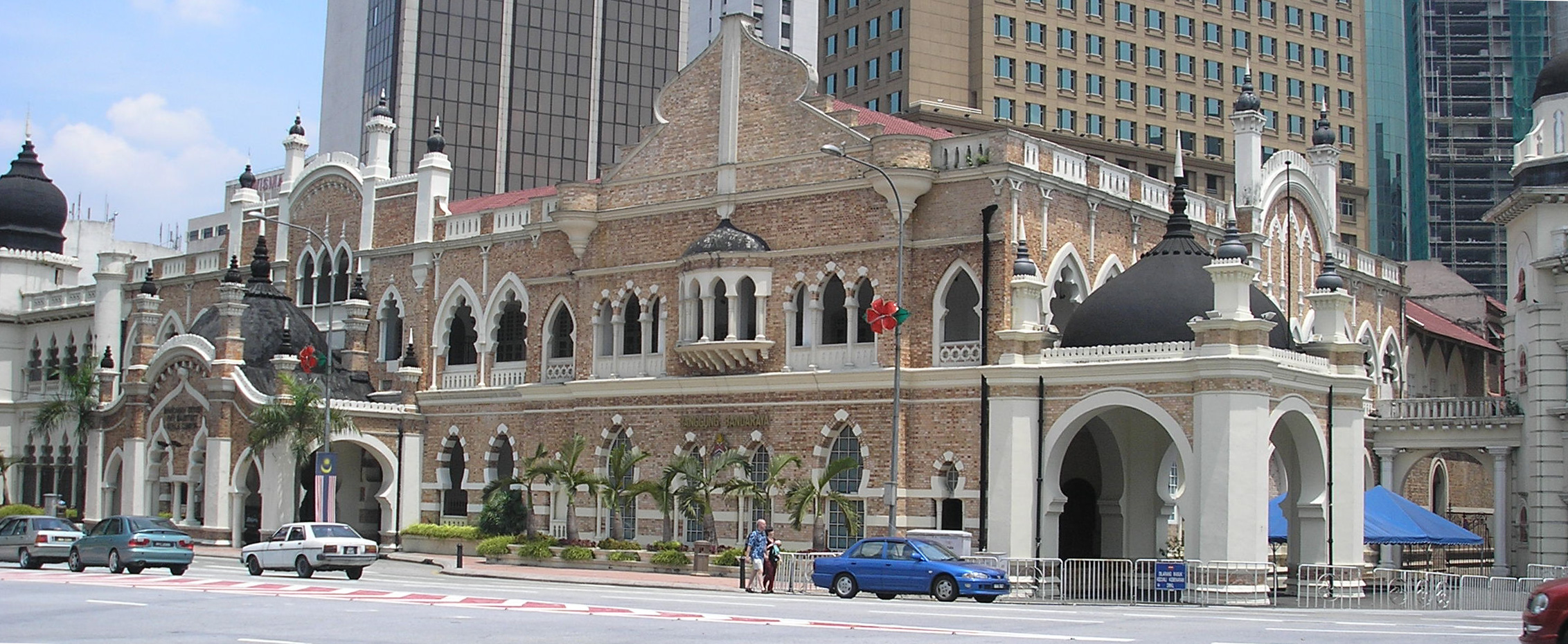
Old Town Hall of Kuala Lumpur

Hubback worked on the following buildings:

- (1894–1897)
  - Federal Secretariat (Sultan Abdul Samad Building), ground plan based on A. C. Norman's design with elevations by R. A. J. Bidwell. Hubback contributed to the design and also designed the fixtures of the building.
- 1901
  - Carcosa Seri Negara, Kuala Lumpur (also credited to A.C. Norman)
- 1904
  - Municipal Office & Town Hall, Kuala Lumpur (Sanitary Board/Town Hall)

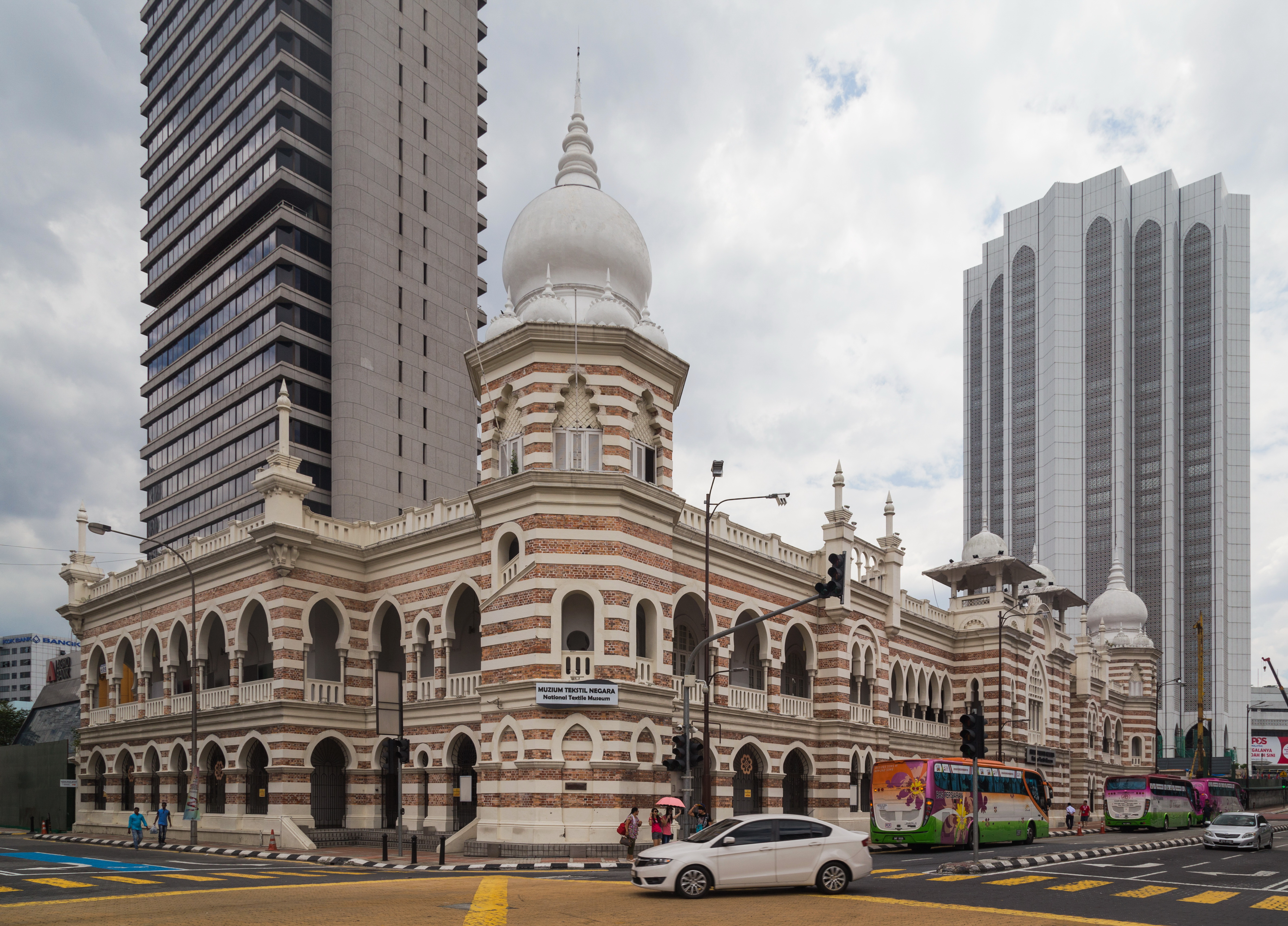
F.M.S Railway Headquarters, now the National Textile Museum

- 1905
  - F.M.S Central Railways Offices, Kuala Lumpur (currently National Textile Museum)
  - Shop Houses on Old Market Square, Kuala Lumpur
- 1906
  - Residence of High Commissioner, Kuala Kangsar
  - Selangor Museum, Kuala Lumpur (Rebuilt, now the National Museum)

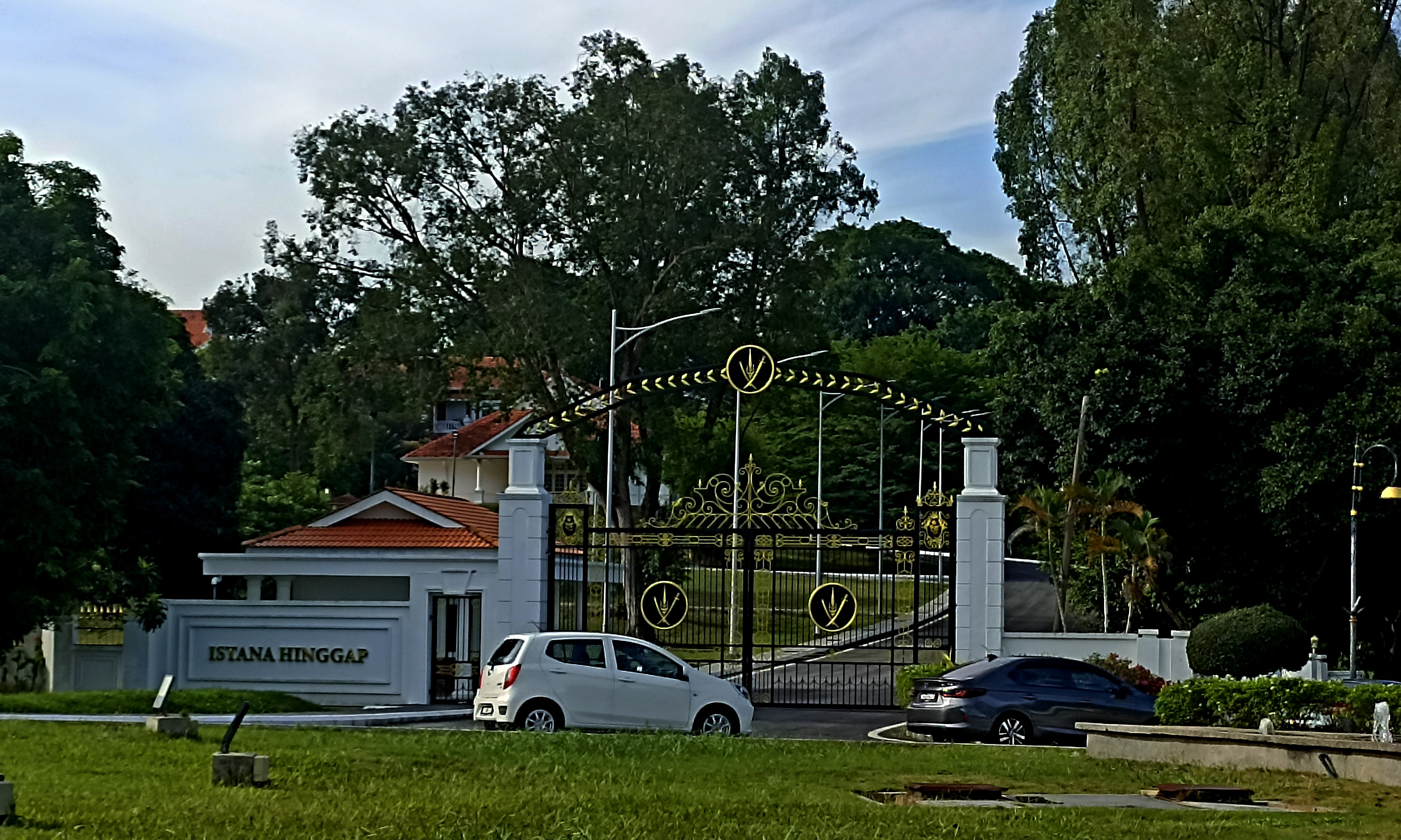
Istana Hinggap, Seremban

- 1907
  - British Residency, Seremban (now Istana Hinggap)
  - F.M.S Railways Terminal Office, Penang (Wisma Kastam – Malayan Railway Building)
  - General Post Office, Kuala Lumpur

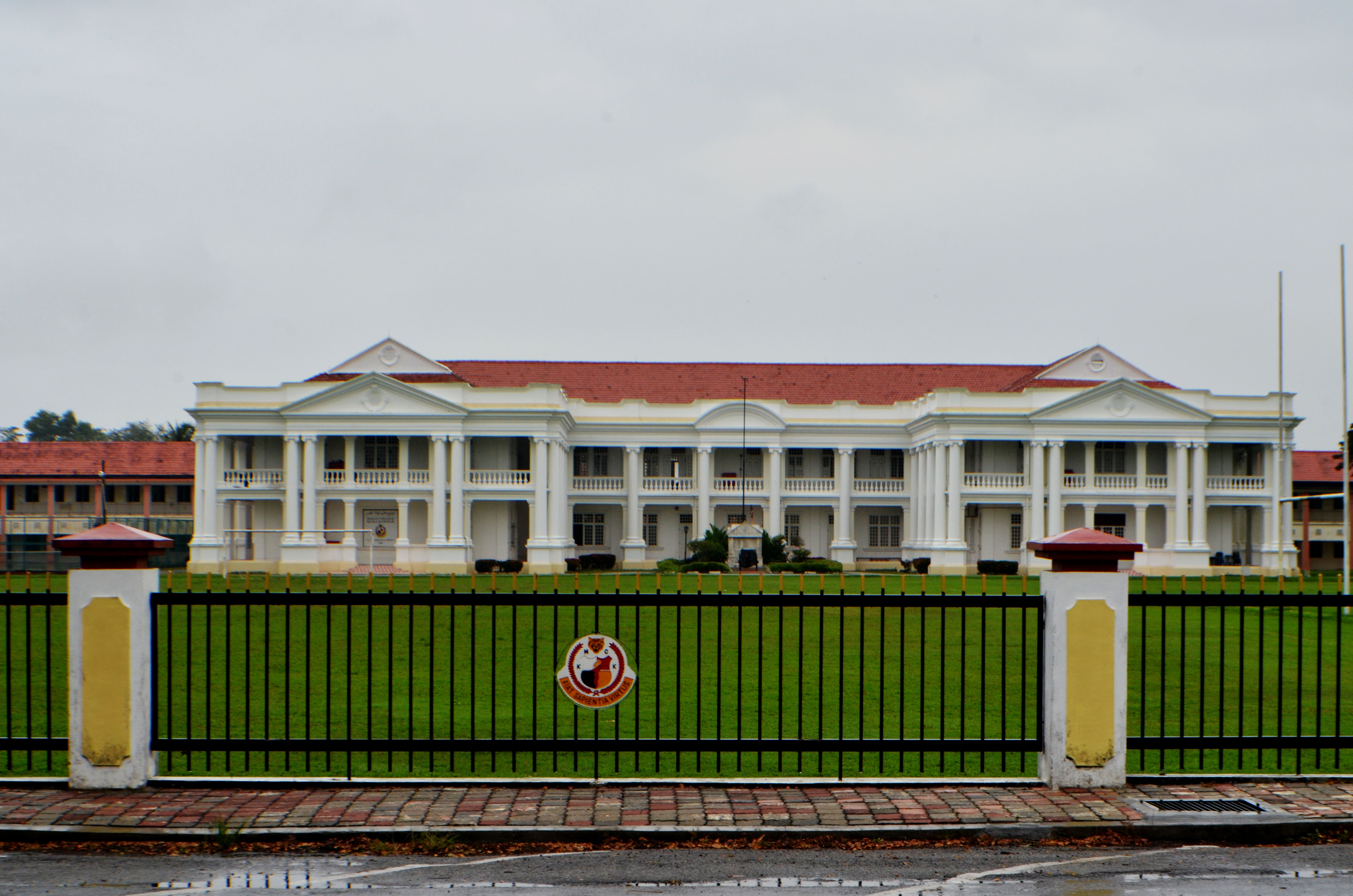
Malay College, Kuala Kangsar

- 1909
  - Jamek Mosque, Kuala Lumpur
  - The Big School Malay College, Kuala Kangsar (Malay College Kuala Kangsar)
  - The White House of Klang (The Sultan Abdul Aziz Royal Gallery)

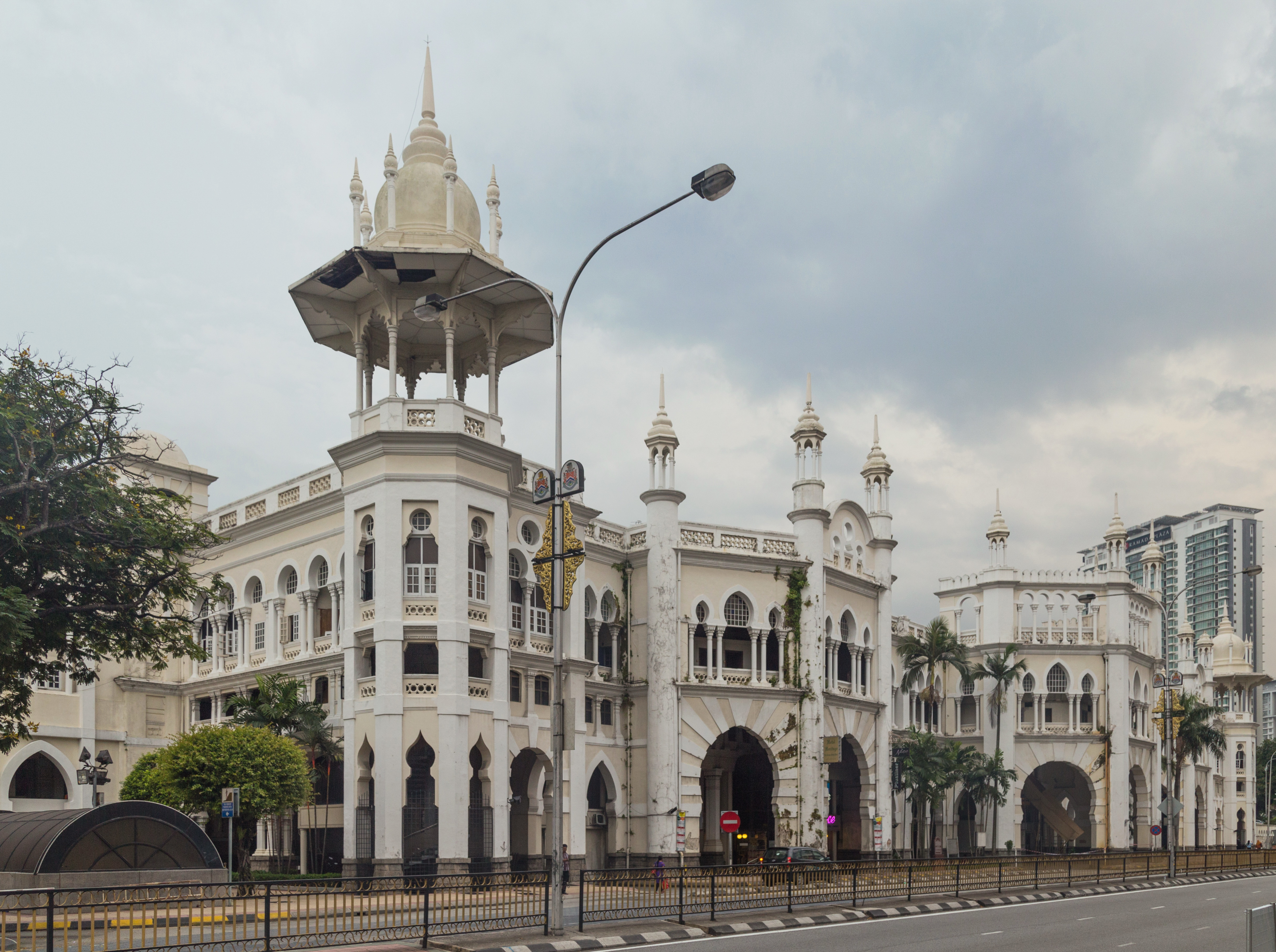
Kuala Lumpur railway station

- 1910
  - Andersons Boy School, Ipoh
  - Railway Station & Hotel, Kuala Lumpur
  - Selangor Club 1910, Kuala Lumpur (Royal Selangor Club)
  - Federal Survey Office, Kuala Lumpur

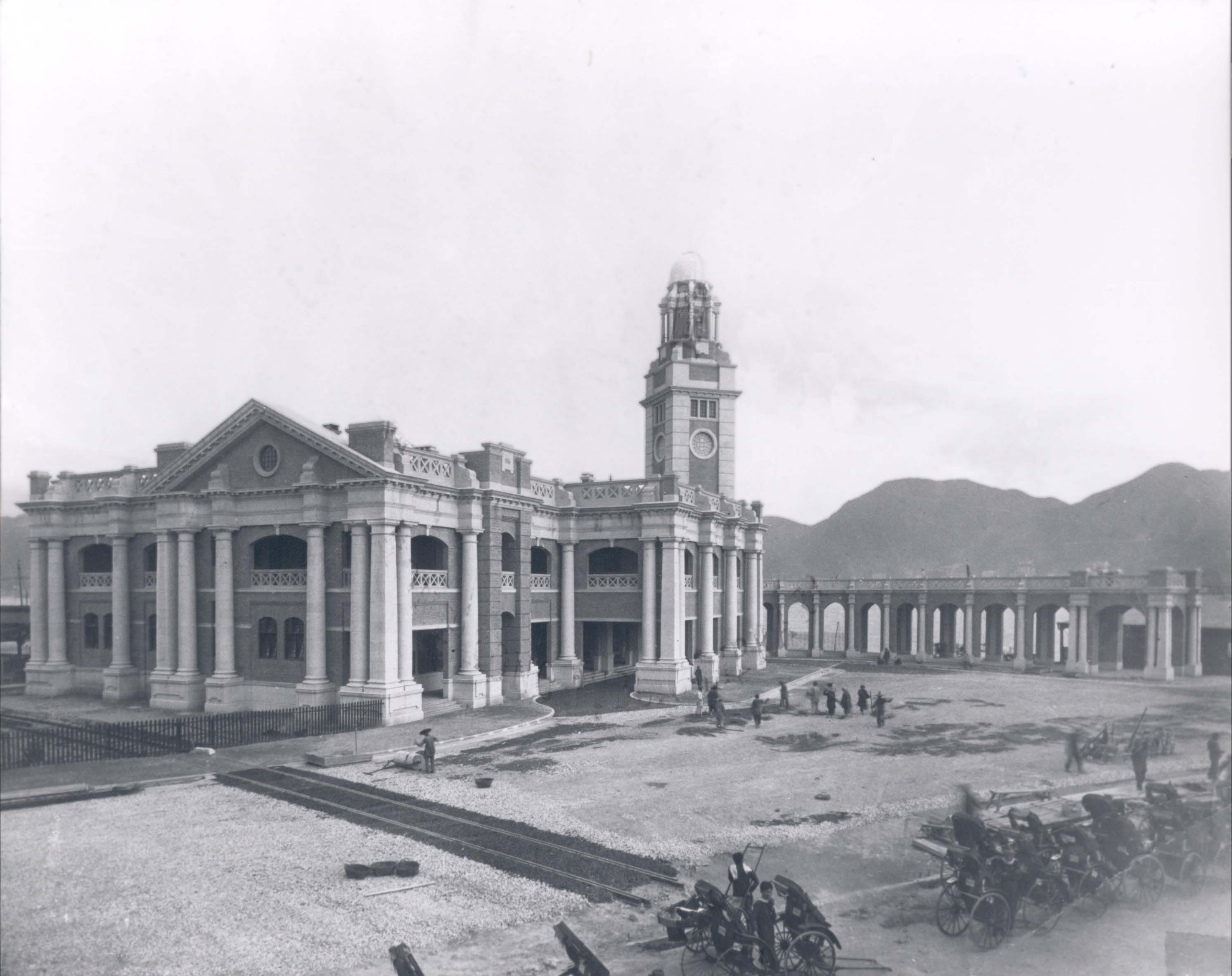
Kowloon railway station (demolished 1977 except for the Clock Tower)

- 1911
  - Federal Lunatic Asylum, Tanjung Rambutan, Ipoh (renamed Central Mental Hospital and subsequently renamed in 1970 Hospital Bahagia Ulu Kinta)
  - The White House of Klang (The Sultan Abdul Aziz Royal Gallery)

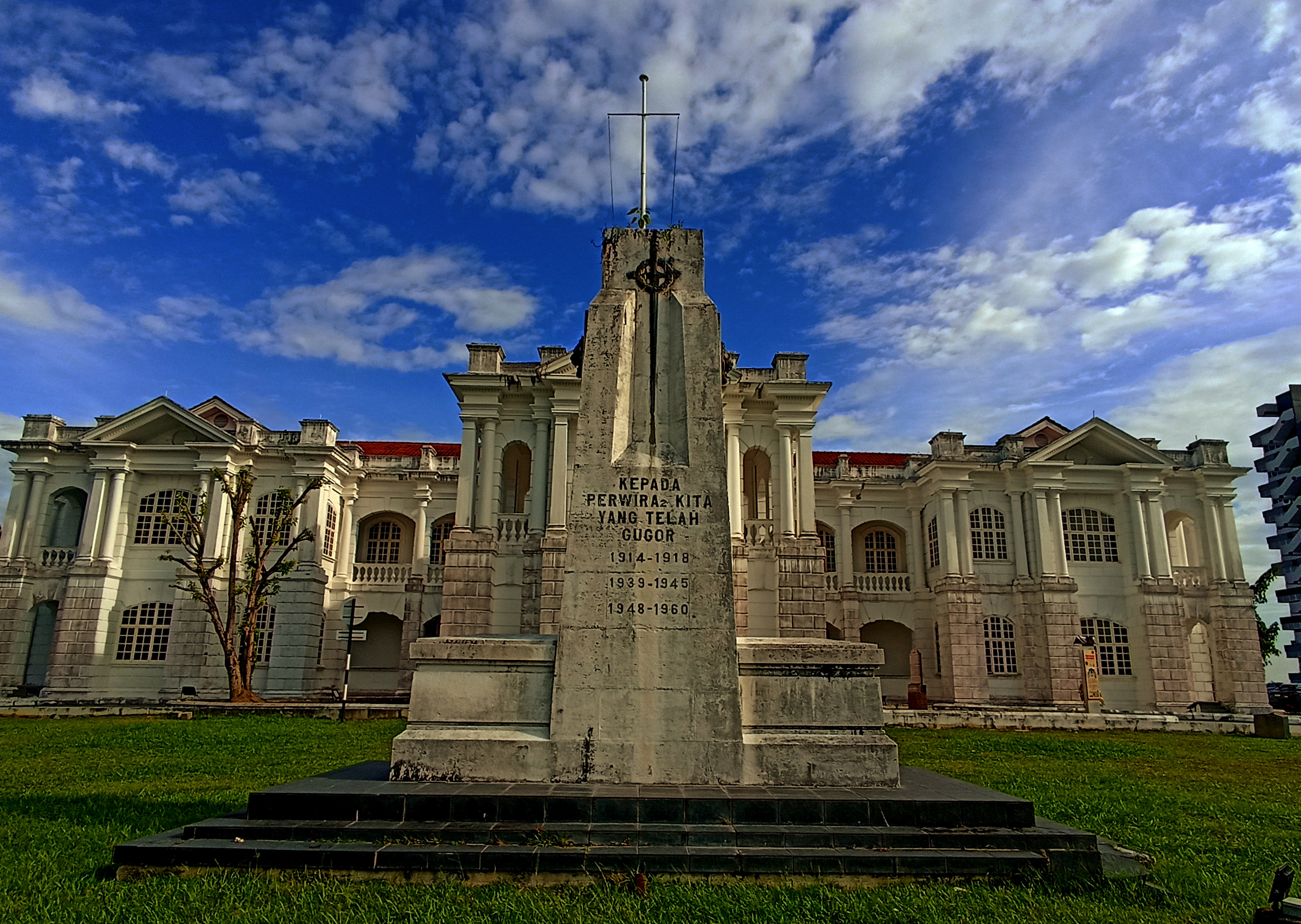
White House, Seremban

- 1912
  - White House, Seremban (Former Negeri Sembilan State Secretariat Office)
  - Preparatory School, Malay College Kuala Kangsar (MCKK) – Prep School, Kuala Kangsar, Perak
- 1913
  - Kowloon railway station, Hong Kong (Demolished in 1977, only the Clock Tower remains)

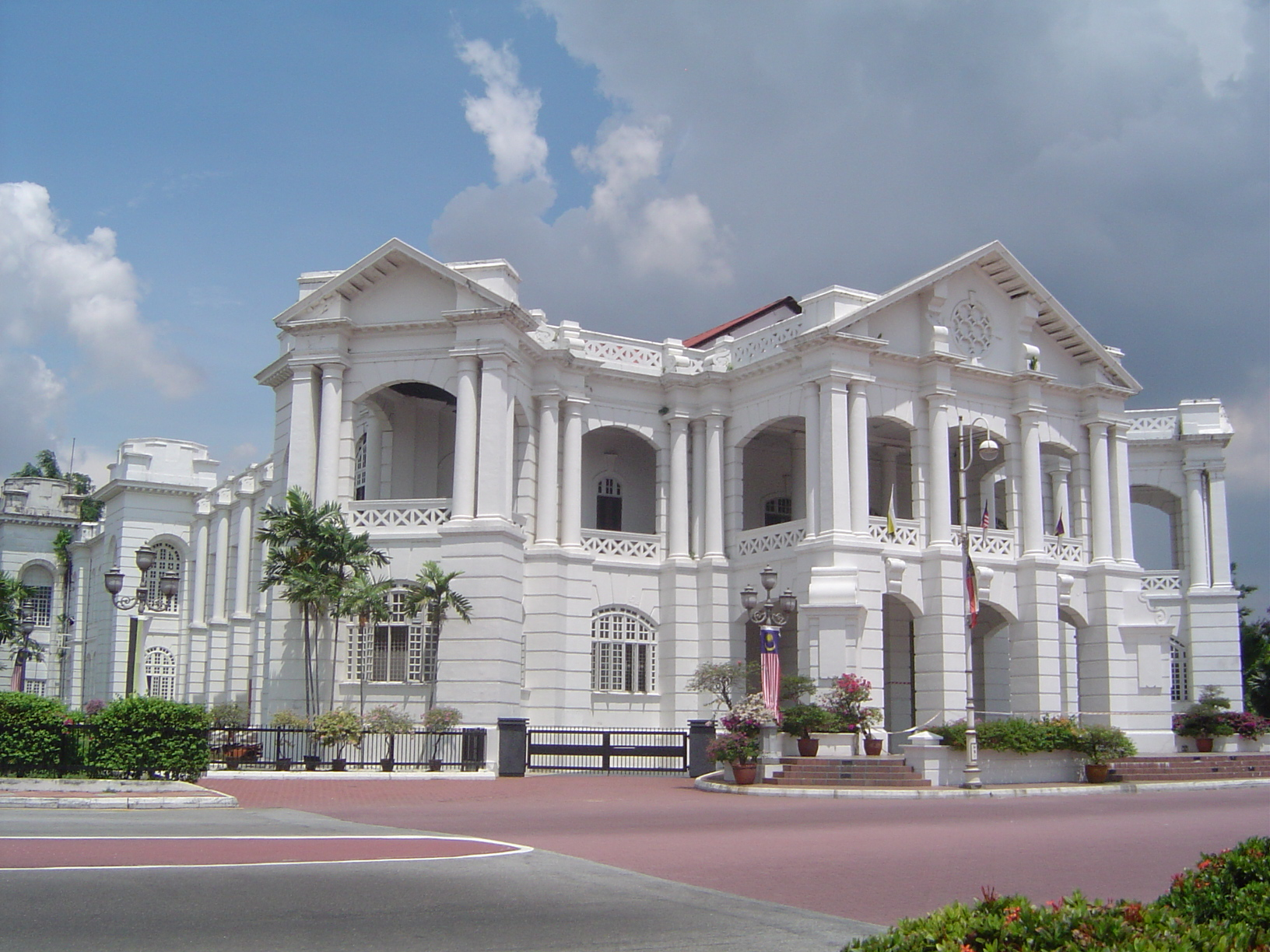
Ipoh Town Hall

- 1914
  - Selangor Museum (Extension & alteration) Kuala Lumpur
- 1915
  - Supreme Court, Kuala Lumpur (Kuala Lumpur High Court)
- 1916
  - Town Hall and Post Office, Ipoh
- 1917
  - Idris Memorial Mosque, Kuala Kangsar (Ubudiah Mosque)
  - Malay Railway Administration Building, Kuala Lumpur

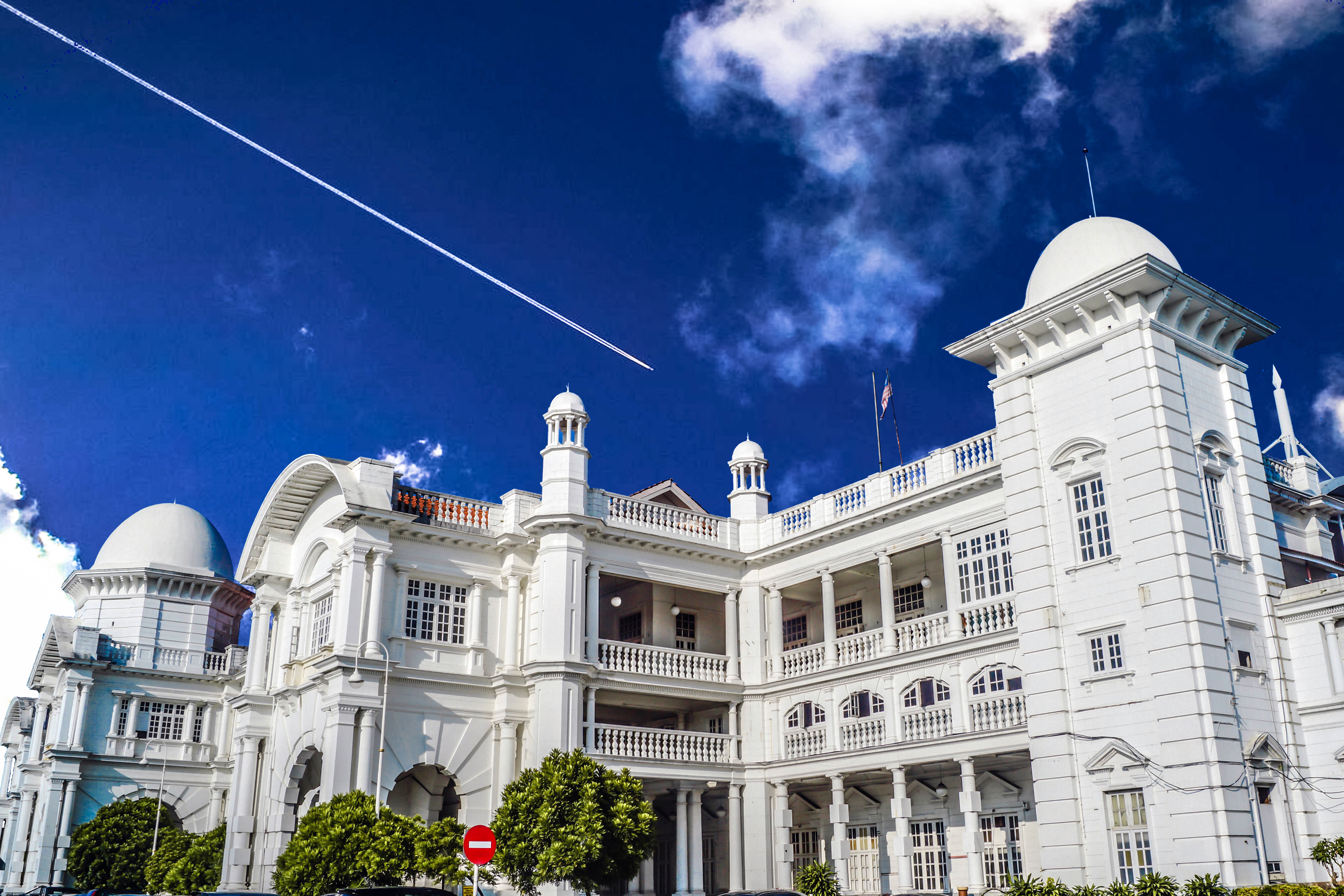
Ipoh railway station

- 1920
  - Railway Station & Hotel, Ipoh (Ipoh railway station)

Source Included From: A.B Hubback: An Architectural Celebration in Malaya Exhibition. Located at National Textile Museum, Kuala Lumpur.
Jointly Organized by PAM Heritage Conservation Committee, Department of Museums Malaysia and National Textile Museum Officially Supported by Masjid Jamek, British Council, Arch, webmaster of thehubbacks.org, midor, ALFO, MIBOUTIQUE and Kuala Lumpur.

== Significance of Hubback’s work ==
Hubback's architectural work is rooted in 19th-century eclectic historicism. One style of his architecture may be known as Indo-Saracenic, which is a blend of Mughal forms with Byzantine, Romanesque, and Gothic details. The first major work Hubback was involved in, the Sultan Abdul Samad Building, is in this style. It was largely the work by R. A. J. Bidwell following the design direction set by the State Engineer Charles Edwin Spooner, and Hubback made additions and alterations to the building under Spooner's instructions. This strand of English colonial architecture was based on Indian Islamic architecture and not native to Malaya. Hubback and Bidwell effectively introduced into the Malaysian architectural vocabulary the onion dome. The Federal Secretariat/Sultan Abdul Samad Building formed the perimeter of the Padang or Merdeka Square is as much a part of the architectural consciousness of Malaysia as the Houses of Parliament is to Britain. Many of his buildings, such as the Railway Station and Jamek Mosque, are landmarks in Kuala Lumpur.

The twentieth-century quality of his architectural output is that he created a number of large buildings to house the colonial government's administrative functions, an architectural recognition of the increasing spatial demands of an official bureaucracy, but in elegant dress. While in post-independence Malaysia these functions have moved elsewhere, these buildings remain as a potent visual symbol of the country.

== Honours ==
- 1905 Associate of the Royal Institute of British Architects
- 1909 Fellow of the Royal Institute of British Architects
- 1913 Honorary Diocesan Architect for the Diocese of Singapore
- 1916 Companion of the Order of St Michael and St George
- 1918 Distinguished Service Order.

== Sports ==
Hubback was an active sportsman who played the following sport:

- 2 June 1894 – Played cricket for Liverpool in the Liverpool vs. Birkenhead Park match, Aigburth Liverpool.
- 9 September 1896 – Made his first century in cricket
- 4 February 1897 – Played cricket in Selangor vs. Singapore match.
- 24–25 October 1897 – Took leave to play for the Straits Settlements Cricket Team in a Cricket Festival in Hong Kong.
- 8 November 1897 – Played in the Interport matches: 1897/98 Hong Kong and Shanghai vs. Straits Settlements, Hong Kong Cricket Club Ground, Hong Kong
- 14 November 1897 – Played in the Interport matches: 1897/98 Hong Kong and Shanghai vs. Straits Settlements, Hong Kong Cricket Club Ground, Hong Kong.
- November 1899 – Represented F.M.S in a cricket match in Burma.
- 4 February 1905 – Played in Straits Settlements in F.M.S cricket match, F.M.S vs. Straits Settlements at the Padang Kuala Lumpur.
- 1906– Captained the F.M.S team in a cricket match in Burma
- 16 August 1906 – Cricket match, F.M.S in Straits in Straits Settlements 1906, Straits Settlement vs. Federated Malay States at the Padang, Singapore.
- 30 March 1907 – Played in Straits Settlements in Federated Malay States 1906/07
- 5 August 1907 – Played in F.M.S in Straits Settlements 1907 cricket match, Straits Settlements vs. F.M.S at Penang Cricket Club Ground, Penang.
- 31 July 1908 – Played in F.M.S inStraits Settlements cricket match 1908, Straits Settlements vs. Federated Malay States, The Pedang, Singapore.
- 30 January 1911 – Played in Straits Settlements in Federated Malay States cricket match 1910/11, F.M.S vs. Straits Settlements, The Pedang Kuala Lumpur.
