= Theodore Hubback =

English cricketer, conservationist, and author

Personal information
- Full name: Theodore Rathbone Hubback
- Born: 17 December 1872; Liverpool, Lancashire, England
- Died: 1942 (aged 69–70); Malaya
- Role: Wicket-keeper

Domestic team information
- Years: Team
- 1892–1893: Liverpool and District
- 1892: Lancashire
- First-class debut: 11 July 1892 Liverpool and District v Yorkshire
- Last First-class: 15 May 1893 Liverpool and District v Yorkshire

Career statistics
Competition	First-class
Matches	6
Runs scored	140
Batting average	15.55
100s/50s	0/1
Top score	67
Catches/stumpings	3/2
- Source: CricketArchive, 4 December 2007

Theodore Rathbone Hubback (17 December 1872 – 1942) was an English engineer, conservationist and author in what is now Malaysia. He was instrumental in the formation of the King George V National Park in 1938, now known as Taman Negara. A wicket-keeper, he played first-class cricket for Lancashire in 1892.

== Life ==
He was the son of Joseph Hubback, a Liverpool merchant who was Lord Mayor of the city in 1870, and brother of Arthur Benison Hubback. He studied at University College, Liverpool, and then went to Selangor where his brother was, in 1895.

He worked as a civil engineer and contractor in Malaya. For a while he also worked as a rubber planter. He became known as a big game hunter, however he later became a conservationist and an author, writing on the wildlife of Alaska, Africa and Malaya. He discovered a Malayan species of gaur, Bos Gaurus Hubbacki, which is named after him.

Hubback lobbied the sultans of Pahang, Terengganu and Kelantan to set aside a piece of land that covers the three states for the creation of a protected area. The resulting national park, the King George V National Park named after the then reigning British monarch, was created in 1938/1939. It was later renamed Taman Negara or National Park in Malay after independence.

== Career in cricket ==
After playing two matches for the Lancashire second XI in June 1892, he first played for the first XI against Durham on 8 July. He made his first-class debut for Liverpool and District against Yorkshire a few days later.

After playing four first-class matches for Lancashire in 1892, he bookended his first-class career with a second game for Liverpool and District against Yorkshire. He later settled in Malaya, where he played for the Straits Settlements between 1897 and 1909.
