= National Textile Museum =

Museum in Kuala Lumpur, Malaysia

- Muzium Tekstil Negara
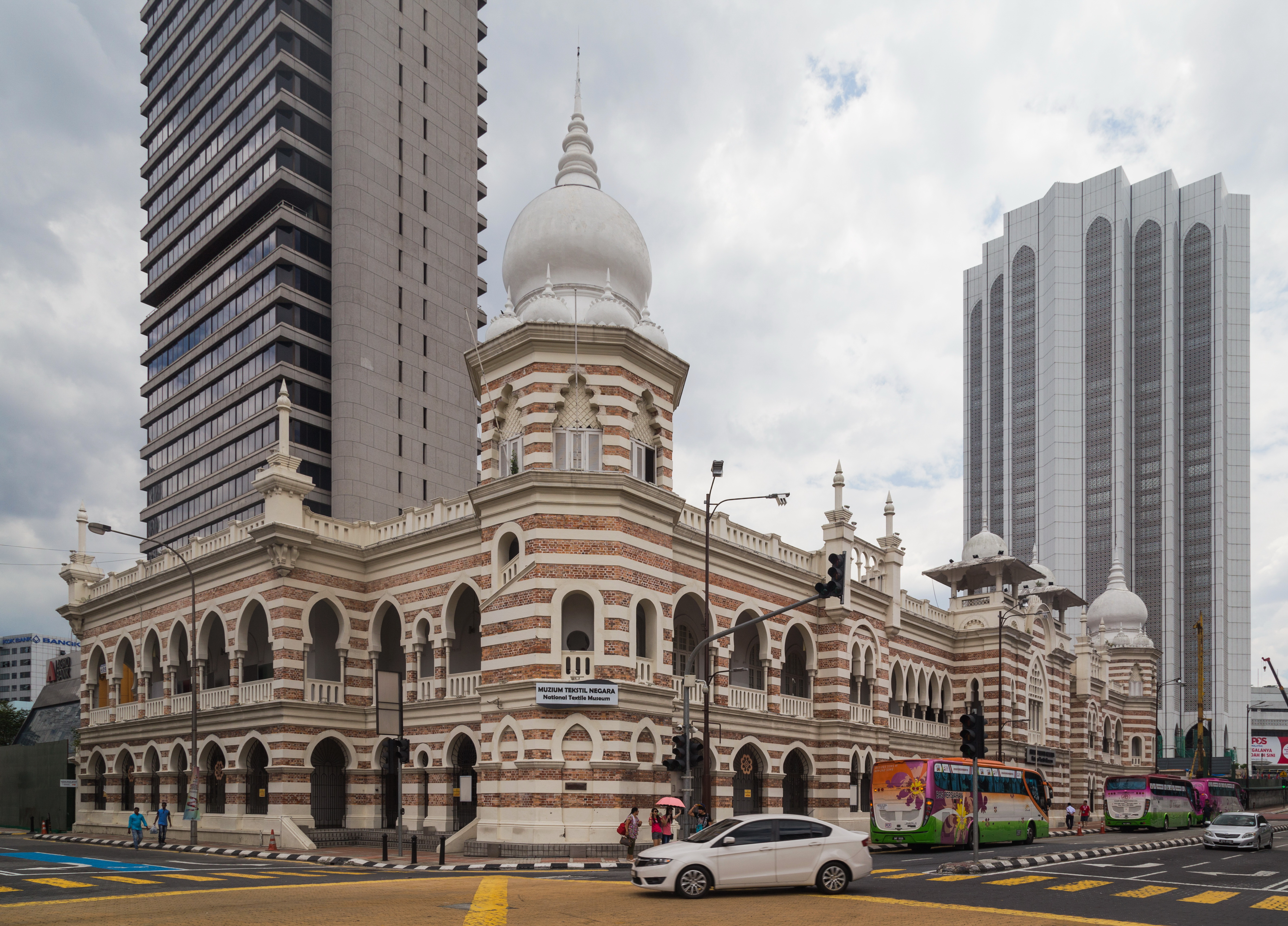
- Established: 9 January 2010
- Location: Kuala Lumpur, Malaysia
- Coordinates: 3°08′48.3″N 101°41′38.6″E
- Type: Textile museum
- Architect: Arthur Benison Hubback
- Website: Official website

The National Textile Museum (Malay: Muzium Tekstil Negara) is a museum in Kuala Lumpur, Malaysia. The museum is open daily from 9 am to 6 pm, with admission fees ranging from RM2 to RM5.

It is adjacent to the Sultan Abdul Samad Building.

== History ==
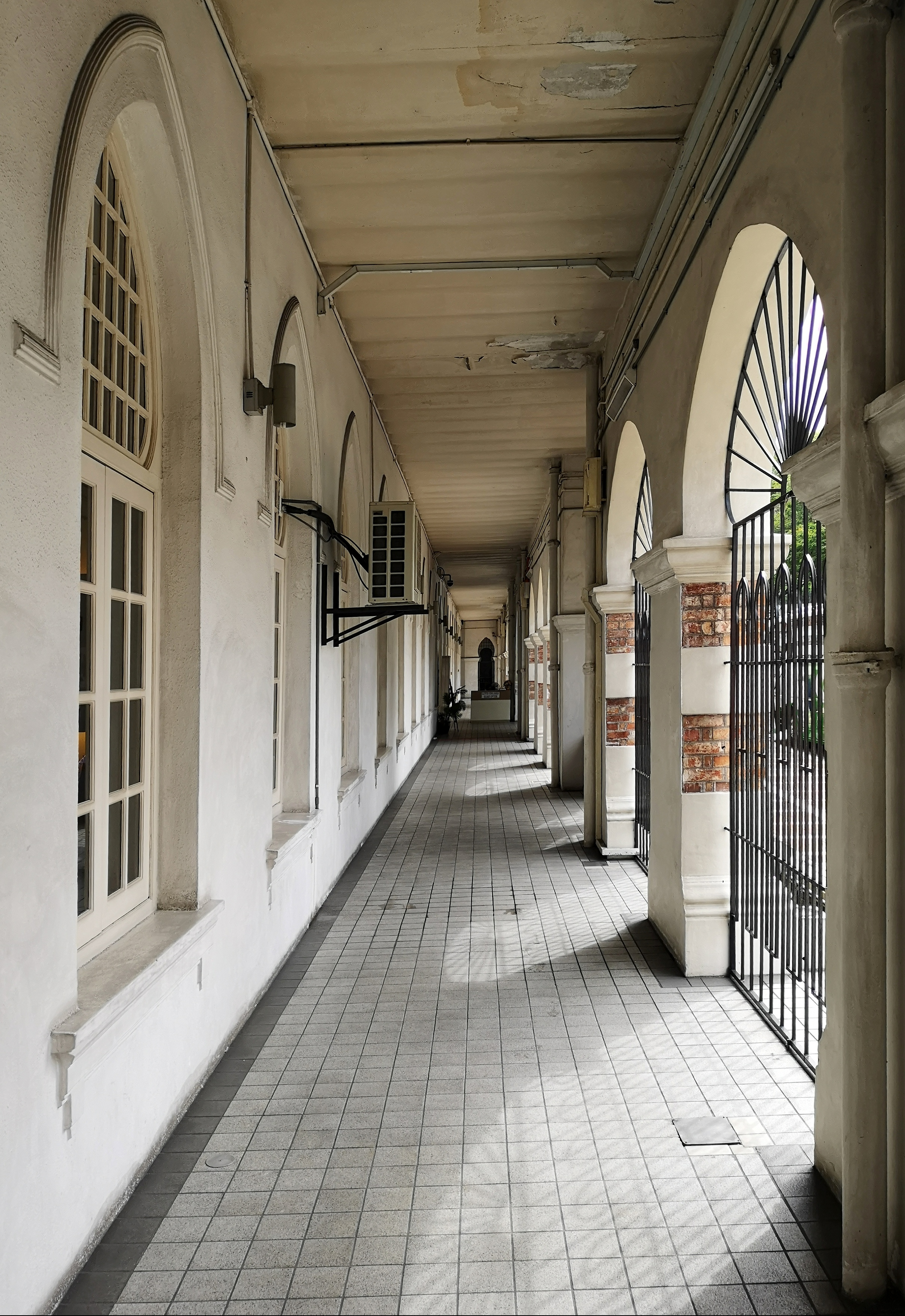
Exterior

Designed by Arthur Benison Hubback in an Indo-Saracenic Revival architecture, the building was originally completed in 1905 to house the headquarters for the Federated Malay States Railways (FMSR, now KTM). After the FMSR moved to the Railway Administration Building in 1917, the building was handed to the Selangor Public Works department, and has subsequently housed various government and commercial occupants, including the Selangor Water Department, the Malaysian Central Bank, Agricultural Bank of Malaysia, Malaysian Craft and the High Court, before being converted for use as the National Textile Museum and opened to the public on 9 January 2010.

The building is officially designated as JKR Building 26. It was gazetted as a historical building in 1983.

== Architecture ==
The museum building is a 2.5-floor building, occupying an area of 3,145.3 m^{2}. The building was designed with Moorish architectural style.

== Exhibitions ==
- Pohon Budi Gallery
- Pelangi Gallery
- Teluk Berantai Gallery
- Ratna Sari Gallery

== Transportation ==
The museum is accessible within walking distance south west of Masjid Jamek LRT Station of RapidKL.

== See also ==
- List of museums in Malaysia
- List of tourist attractions in Malaysia
- Merdeka Textile Museum
