= Panggung Bandaraya DBKL =

Performing arts venue in Kuala Lumpur, Malaysia

Coordinates: 3°9′1″N 101°41′42″E

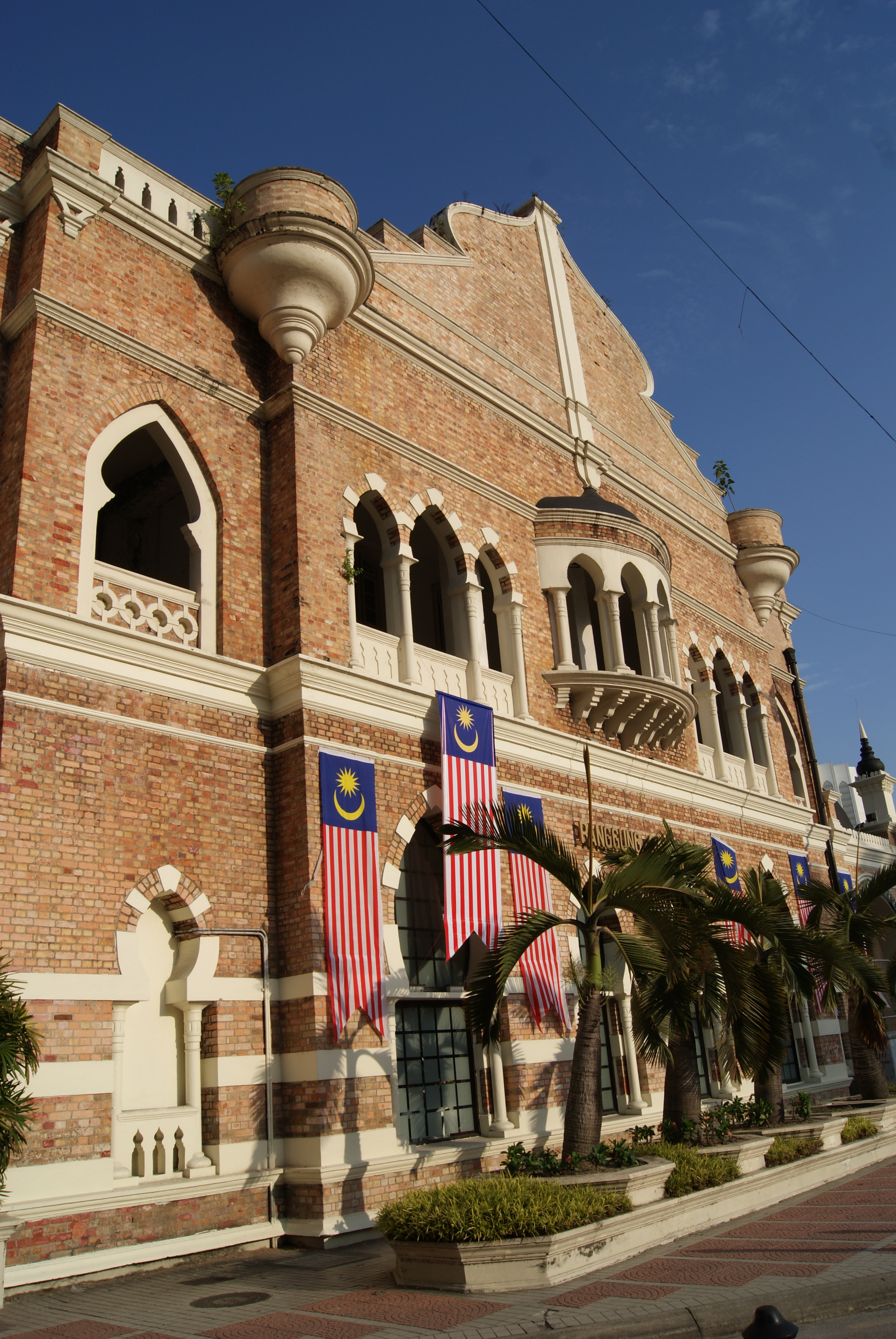
Panggung Bandaraya DBKL

Panggung Bandaraya DBKL (Malay for DBKL City Theatre) is a historical theatre hall located across the Merdeka Square in Kuala Lumpur, Malaysia, at the junction of Jalan Tun Perak and Jalan Raja. Construction began in 1896 and was completely finished in 1904.

The theatre formerly occupies the historic Old City Hall of Kuala Lumpur. The theatre and old City Hall building were designed by a colonial government architect, Arthur Benison Hubback, who was also responsible for designing the Kuala Lumpur Railway Station, the Jamek Mosque and other colonial structures throughout the Klang Valley.

It was built for production stages such as plays and musicals.

== Heritage preservation ==
The Panggung Bandaraya is gazetted as a heritage building under the Antiquities Act, and its Moorish façade has been preserved.

A major fire in 1992 destroyed the entire interior of the theatre but the City Hall's designers and builders restored it soon after. The refurbishment that was undertaken has incorporated significant modifications to the furnishings and the sound system, which were updated.

== Transportation ==
The theater is accessible within walking distance north west of Masjid Jamek LRT Station.

== See also ==
- List of concert hall in Malaysia
