= Deputy Chief of Army (Malaysia) =

Malaysian Army appointment

- Timbalan Panglima Tentera Darat تيمبلن ڤڠليما تنترا دارت
- Crest of Deputy Chief of Army
- Incumbent; Lieutenant General Dato'; Mohamad Suria Mohamad Saad since 18 January 2026
- Malaysian Army
- Style: Yang Berbahagia (The Honorable)
- Abbreviation: TPTD
- Reports to: Chief of Army
- Term length: Not fixed
- Formation: 1 January 1971
- First holder: Major General Dato' Mohd Sany Abdul Ghaffar
- Salary: JUSA A
- Website: Deputy Chief of Army

The Deputy Chief of Army (Malay: Timbalan Panglima Tentera Darat) is the senior appointment in the Malaysian Army and has been held by a three-star officer in the rank of lieutenant general since 1980. The Deputy Chief of Army directly reports to the Chief of Army.

The current Deputy Chief of Army is Lieutenant General Dato' Mohamad Suria Mohamad Saad who succeeded Lieutenant General Dato' Tengku Muhammad Fauzi Tengku Ibrahim on 18 January 2026.

== List of officeholders ==
No.	Portrait	Name (born–died)	Term of office			Branch of service	Ref.
No.	Portrait	Name (born–died)	Took office	Left office	Time in office	Branch of service	Ref.
Deputy Chief of General Staff
1	Dato' Mohd Sany Abdul Ghaffar	Major General; Dato' Mohd Sany Abdul Ghaffar (1926–2015)	1 January 1971	31 December 1972	1 year, 365 days	Royal Malay Regiment	
2	Dato' Othman Ibrahim	Major General; Dato' Othman Ibrahim (1929–?)	1 January 1973	31 December 1975	2 years, 364 days	Royal Malay Regiment	
3	Dato' Mohd Ghazali Mohd Seth	Major General; Dato' Mohd Ghazali Mohd Seth (1929–2021)	1 January 1976	30 November 1977	1 year, 333 days	Royal Malay Regiment	–
4	Dato' Zain Hashim	Lieutenant General; Dato' Zain Hashim (1930–2011)	1 January 1978	19 January 1981	3 years, 18 days	Royal Armoured Corps	–
Deputy Chief of Army
5	Dato' Jaafar Onn	Lieutenant General; Dato' Jaafar Onn (1933–2014)	20 January 1981	31 December 1983	2 years, 345 days	Royal Armoured Corps	–
6	Dato' Mohamed Hashim Mohd Ali	Lieutenant General; Dato' Mohamed Hashim Mohd Ali (1937–2025)	1 January 1984	31 October 1985	1 year, 303 days	Royal Malay Regiment	
7	Dato' Yaacob Mohd Zain	Lieutenant General; Dato' Yaacob Mohd Zain (born 1937)	1 November 1985	5 October 1987	1 year, 338 days	Royal Malay Regiment	
8	Dato' Nik Mahmood Fakharuddin	Lieutenant General; Dato' Nik Mahmood Fakharuddin (1936–1990)	6 October 1987	31 January 1990 (Note: Died in office)	2 years, 117 days	Royal Malay Regiment	
9	Dato' Othman Haron	Lieutenant General; Dato' Othman Haron (1938–2016)	31 January 1990	10 April 1992	2 years, 70 days	Royal Malay Regiment	
10	Dato' Borhan Ahmad	Lieutenant General; Dato' Borhan Ahmad (born 1939)	11 April 1992	3 March 1993	326 days	21st Special Service Group	
11	Datuk Seri Panglima Abdul Manap Ibrahim	Lieutenant General; Datuk Seri Panglima Abdul Manap Ibrahim (born 1939)	4 March 1993	1 March 1994	362 days	Royal Ranger Regiment	
12	Dato' Che Md Noor Mat Arshad	Lieutenant General; Dato' Che Md Noor Mat Arshad (1943–2019)	2 March 1994	2 February 1995	337 days	Royal Malay Regiment	
13	Dato' Seri Panglima Mohammad Ali Alwi	Lieutenant General; Dato' Seri Panglima Mohammad Ali Alwi (born 1940)	3 February 1995	30 November 1995	300 days	Royal Ranger Regiment	
14	Dato' Ismail Hassan	Lieutenant General; Dato' Ismail Hassan (born 1942)	1 December 1995	31 May 1997	1 year, 181 days	Royal Malay Regiment	
15	Dato' Pahlawan Mohd Zahidi Zainuddin	Lieutenant General; Dato' Pahlawan Mohd Zahidi Zainuddin (born 1948)	1 June 1997	31 December 1997	213 days	Royal Malay Regiment	
16	Dato' Md Hashim Hussein	Lieutenant General; Dato' Md Hashim Hussein (born 1947)	1 January 1998	31 December 1998	364 days	Royal Malay Regiment	
17	Datuk Abdul Aziz Hassan	Lieutenant General; Datuk Abdul Aziz Hassan (1946–2026)	1 October 1999	14 January 2001	1 year, 105 days	Royal Artillery Regiment	
18	Dato' Abdul Ghafir Abdul Hamid	Lieutenant General; Dato' Abdul Ghafir Abdul Hamid (born 1950)	15 January 2001	11 July 2005	4 years, 177 days	Royal Malay Regiment	
19	Dato' Indera Muhammad Ismail Jamaluddin	Lieutenant General; Dato' Indera Muhammad Ismail Jamaluddin (born 1952)	12 July 2005	31 January 2007	1 year, 203 days	Royal Malay Regiment	–
20	Dato' Indera Masood Zainal Abidin	Lieutenant General; Dato' Indera Masood Zainal Abidin (born 1952)	1 February 2007	1 June 2008	1 year, 121 days	Royal Malay Regiment	–
21	Dato' Indera Zulkifeli Mohd Zin	Lieutenant General; Dato' Indera Zulkifeli Mohd Zin (born 1956)	2 June 2008	20 May 2010	1 year, 352 days	Royal Malay Regiment	–
22	Dato' Pahlawan Zulkifli Zainal Abidin	Lieutenant General; Dato' Pahlawan Zulkifli Zainal Abidin (born 1958)	21 May 2010	13 June 2011	1 year, 23 days	Royal Malay Regiment	
23	Dato' Seri Panglima Ahmad Hasbullah Mohd Nawawi	Lieutenant General; Dato' Seri Panglima Ahmad Hasbullah Mohd Nawawi (born 1960)	1 August 2011	2 September 2018	7 years, 32 days	Royal Malay Regiment	
24	Datuk Hasagaya Abdullah	Lieutenant General; Datuk Hasagaya Abdullah (born 1963)	18 October 2018	18 December 2020	2 years, 61 days	Royal Malay Regiment	
25	Dato' Mohammad Ab Rahman	Lieutenant General; Dato' Mohammad Ab Rahman (born 1964)	19 December 2020	18 April 2023	2 years, 121 days	Royal Malay Regiment	
26	Datuk Muhammad Hafizuddeain Jantan	Lieutenant General; Datuk Muhammad Hafizuddeain Jantan (born 1968)	19 April 2023	5 September 2023	139 days	Royal Malay Regiment	
27	Dato' Tengku Muhammad Fauzi Tengku Ibrahim	Lieutenant General; Dato' Tengku Muhammad Fauzi Tengku Ibrahim (born 1970)	6 September 2023	17 January 2026	2 years, 133 days	Royal Malay Regiment	
28	Dato' Mohamad Suria Mohamad Saad	Lieutenant General; Dato' Mohamad Suria Mohamad Saad (born 1975)	18 January 2026	Incumbent	273 days	Royal Malay Regiment	

== See also ==
- Malaysian Army
- Chief of Army (Malaysia)
