= Mohd Zahidi Zainuddin =

14th Chief of the Malaysian Defence Forces (1999–2005)

Yang Amat Berbahagia Orang Kaya Bendahara Seri Maharaja General (Rtd) Tan Sri Dato' Seri Diraja Mohd Zahidi Zainuddin PGAT PMN PSM SPMK SPMS SPSA SPMP SPKK DSA SSAP SIMP SSMZ SPTS PNBS DHMS DPTS PAT JSD PMP KAT AMN AMK PPA PNBB PJM DPKT PCh
- محمد زاهدي زين الدين
- Mohd Zahidi in 2015

14th Chief of Defence Forces
- In office 1 January 1999 – 28 April 2005
- Monarchs: Ja'afar (1999); Salahuddin (1999–2001); Sirajuddin (2001–2005)
- Prime Minister: Mahathir Mohamad (1999–2003); Abdullah Ahmad Badawi (2003–2005)
- Minister of Defence: Syed Hamid Albar (1998–1999); Najib Razak (1999–2005)
- Preceded by: Ismail Omar
- Succeeded by: Mohd Anwar Mohd Nor

17th Chief of Army
- In office 1 January 1998 – 31 December 1998
- Preceded by: Ismail Hassan
- Succeeded by: Md Hashim Hussein

Personal details
- Born: 30 April 1948 (age 78) Sayong, Kuala Kangsar, Perak, Federation of Malaya
- Spouse: Rasiah Md Nor
- Children: 3
- Education: Royal Military College, Sungai Besi; Quaid-i-Azam University

Military service
- Allegiance: Malaysia
- Branch/service: Malaysian Army
- Years of service: 1968–2005
- Rank: General
- Unit: Royal Malay Regiment
- Battles/wars: Second Malayan Emergency

Mohd Zahidi bin Haji Zainuddin (Jawi: محمد زاهدي بن حاج زين الدين; born 30 April 1948), is a Malaysian retired military officer who served as the 14th chief of Defence Forces from January 1999 to April 2005. Prior to his appointment, he previously served as the 17th Chief of the Malaysian Army from January 1998 to December 1998.

== Educational background ==
Zahidi graduated Master of Science in Defence and Strategic Studies from Quaid-i-Azam University, Pakistan.

He also attended various courses at multiple institutions, such as General Staff College, Philippines, the Joint Services Staff College, Australia, the National Defence College, Pakistan in 1995 and Senior Executive Programme at Harvard Business School in 2006.

== Military career ==
=== Early military career ===
Zahidi undergo officer cadet course at Royal Military College, Kuala Lumpur in 1966, then he commissioned to junior lieutenant in April 1968 and posted as platoon commander in 13th Battalion, Royal Malay Regiment.

Along his early military career, he posted at multiple assignment, such as company commander in 9th Battalion, Royal Malay Regiment, commanding officer of the 24th Battalion, Royal Malay Regiment in 1983 and deputy commander of Royal Military College.

In August 1988, he assigned to lead the Malaysian military observer team for United Nations Iran–Iraq Military Observer Group for six months and the assignment completed in February 1989.

Several months after his assignment was completed, he selected to be aide-de-camp for 9th Yang di-Pertuan Agong, Sultan Azlan Shah.

=== Rise to flag rank and get top command ===
After his assignment as aide-de-camp ended in April 1994, Zahidi got rank promotion to brigadier general and appointed as Commander of 11th Infantry Brigade. He held the position until he selected to undergo the course at National Defence College, Pakistan in the following year.

He appointed as Commander of the Malaysian Army Training and Doctrine Command after he completed the course in late 1996, and then he appointed as 15th Deputy Chief of the Malaysian Army in June 1997.

On 1 January 1998, Zahidi appointed as 17th Chief of the Malaysian Army, following retirement his predecessor Ismail Hassan and got rank promotion to general at the same time.

In the following year, he took the baton of Chief of Defence Force from his predecessor, Ismail Omar following the end of Ismail's term extension one day earlier.

Zahidi got two-years extension of his term before he passed the baton to his successor, Mohd Anwar Mohd Nor on 29 April 2005.

=== Post military career ===
On 25 November 2006 Zahidi appointed as member of Dewan Negara of Perak and then he appointed as Orang Besar Empat of Perak with title "Orang Kaya Bendahara Seri Maharaja" in late April 2013, following death the titleholder Syed Zahiruddin on 20 April in the same year.

In several corporations, he holds a number important positions including chairman of Affin Bank from 2017 to 2019 and chairman of the Armed Forces Fund Board from 2018 to 2021

He is also the pro-chancellor of the Universiti Sultan Azlan Shah since December 2018.

== Personal life ==
Zahidi was married Rasiah binti Mohd Nor and had two sons and one daughter with her.

== Honours ==
=== Honours of Malaysia ===
- Malaysia
  - Commander of the Order of the Defender of the Realm (PMN) – Tan Sri (2001)
  - Commander of the Order of Loyalty to the Crown of Malaysia (PSM) – Tan Sri (1999)
  - Companion of the Order of Loyalty to the Royal Family of Malaysia (JSD) (1993)
  - Member of the Order of the Defender of the Realm (AMN) (1983)
  - Recipient of the General Service Medal (PPA)
  - Recipient of the United Nations Missions Service Medal (PNBB) with "IRAQ" clasp
  - Recipient of the 9th Yang di-Pertuan Agong Installation Medal
  - Recipient of the 11th Yang di-Pertuan Agong Installation Medal
  - Recipient of the 12th Yang di-Pertuan Agong Installation Medal
- Malaysian Armed Forces
  - Courageous Commander of the Order of Military Service (PGAT)
  - Warrior of the Order of Military Service (PAT)
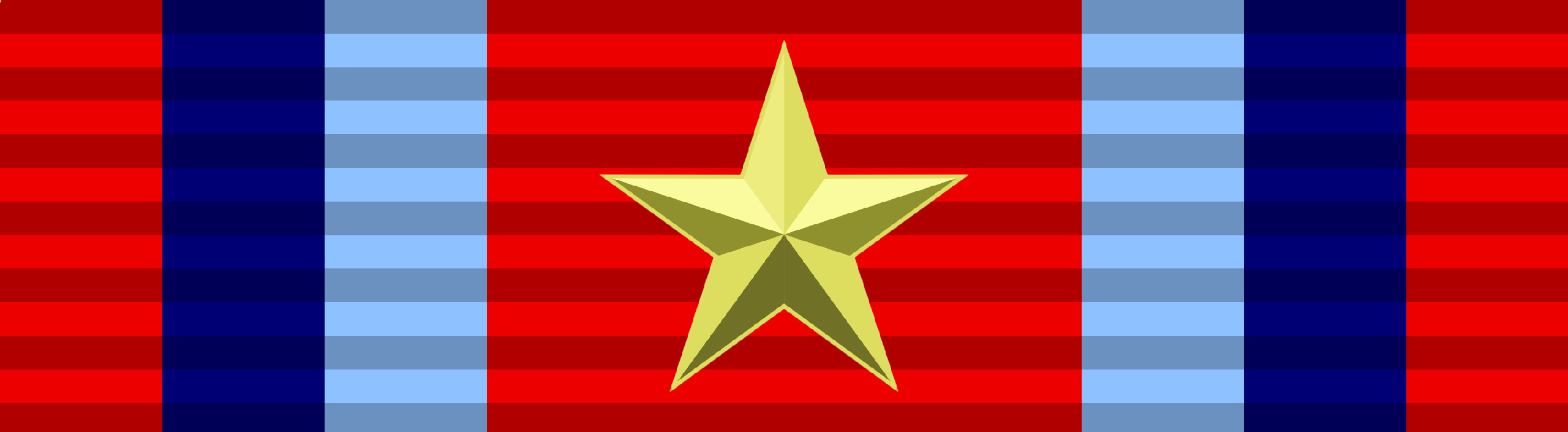
  - Officer of Order of Military Service (KAT)
  - Recipient of the Malaysian Service Medal (PJM)
- Kedah
  - Knight Commander of the Order of Loyalty to Sultan Abdul Halim Mu'adzam Shah (DHMS) – Dato' Paduka (2000)
  - Member of the Order of the Crown of Kedah (AMK)
- Kelantan
  - Knight Grand Commander of the Order of the Crown of Kelantan (SPMK) – Dato' (2004)
  - Knight Grand Commander of the Order of the Noble Crown of Kelantan (SPKK) – Dato' (1999)
- Pahang
  - Knight Grand Companion of the Order of Sultan Ahmad Shah of Pahang (SSAP) – Dato' Sri (2003)
  - Knight Grand Companion of the Order of the Crown of Pahang (SIMP) – Dato' Indera (1998)
  - Recipient of the Sultan Ahmad Shah Silver Jubilee Medal
- Perak
  - Ordinary Class of the Perak Family Order of Sultan Azlan Shah (SPSA) – Dato' Seri Diraja (2014)
  - Grand Knight of the Azlanii Royal Family Order (DSA) – Dato' Seri (2009)
  - Knight Grand Commander of the Order of Taming Sari (SPTS) – Dato' Seri Panglima (1998)
  - Knight Commander of the Order of Taming Sari (DPTS) – Dato' Pahlawan (1995)
  - Commander of the Order of the Perak State Crown (PMP) (1993)
  - Recipient of the Sultan Azlan Shah Silver Jubilee Medal
  - Recipient of the Sultan Nazrin Shah Installation Medal
- Perlis
  - Knight Grand Commander of the Order of the Crown of Perlis (SPMP) – Dato' Seri (2003)
  - Recipient of the Tuanku Syed Sirajuddin Jamalullail Installation Medal
- Sarawak
  - Knight Commander of the Order of the Star of Sarawak (PNBS) – Dato Sri (2003)
- Selangor
  - Knight Grand Commander of the Order of the Crown of Selangor (SPMS) – Dato' Seri (2003)
  - Recipient of the Sultan Sharafuddin Coronation Medal
- Terengganu
  - Knight Grand Companion of the Order of Sultan Mizan Zainal Abidin of Terengganu (SSMZ) – Dato' Seri (2003)
  - Recipient of the Sultan Mizan Zainal Abidin Coronation Medal

=== Foreign honours ===
- Brunei
  - First Class of the Order of Paduka Keberanian Laila Terbilang (DPKT) – Dato Paduka Seri (1999)
  - Recipient of the Sultan Hassanal Bolkiah Silver Jubilee Medal
- France
  - Commander of the National Order of Merit (2000)
- Indonesia
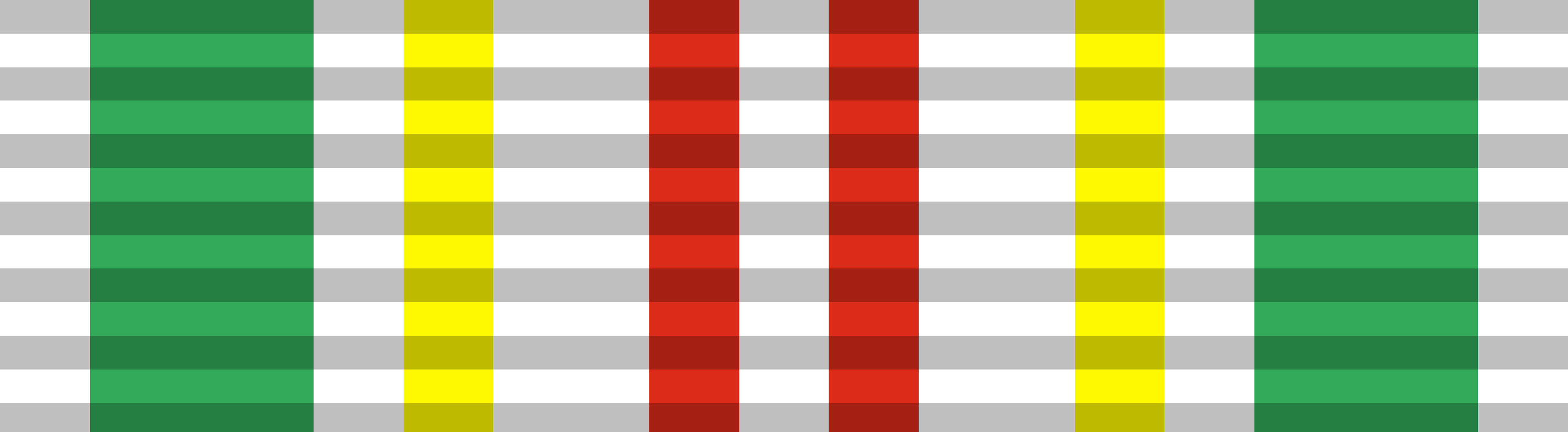
  - First Class (Utama) of the Star of Yudha Dharma
- Thailand
  - Knight Grand Cross of the Order of the White Elephant (PCh) (2000)
- United Nations
  - Recipient of the UNIIMOG Medal
