= Tengku Muhammad Fauzi Tengku Ibrahim =

Malaysian military officer (born 1970)

Yang Mulia Lieutenant General Dato' Sri Tengku Muhammad Fauzi Tengku Ibrahim SSAP PSAT DPMS DSMZ DSDK DPSM PAT KAT KMN KSD AMT AMK PPS PPA PNBB PJM
- تڠکو محمد فوزي تڠکو ابراهيم
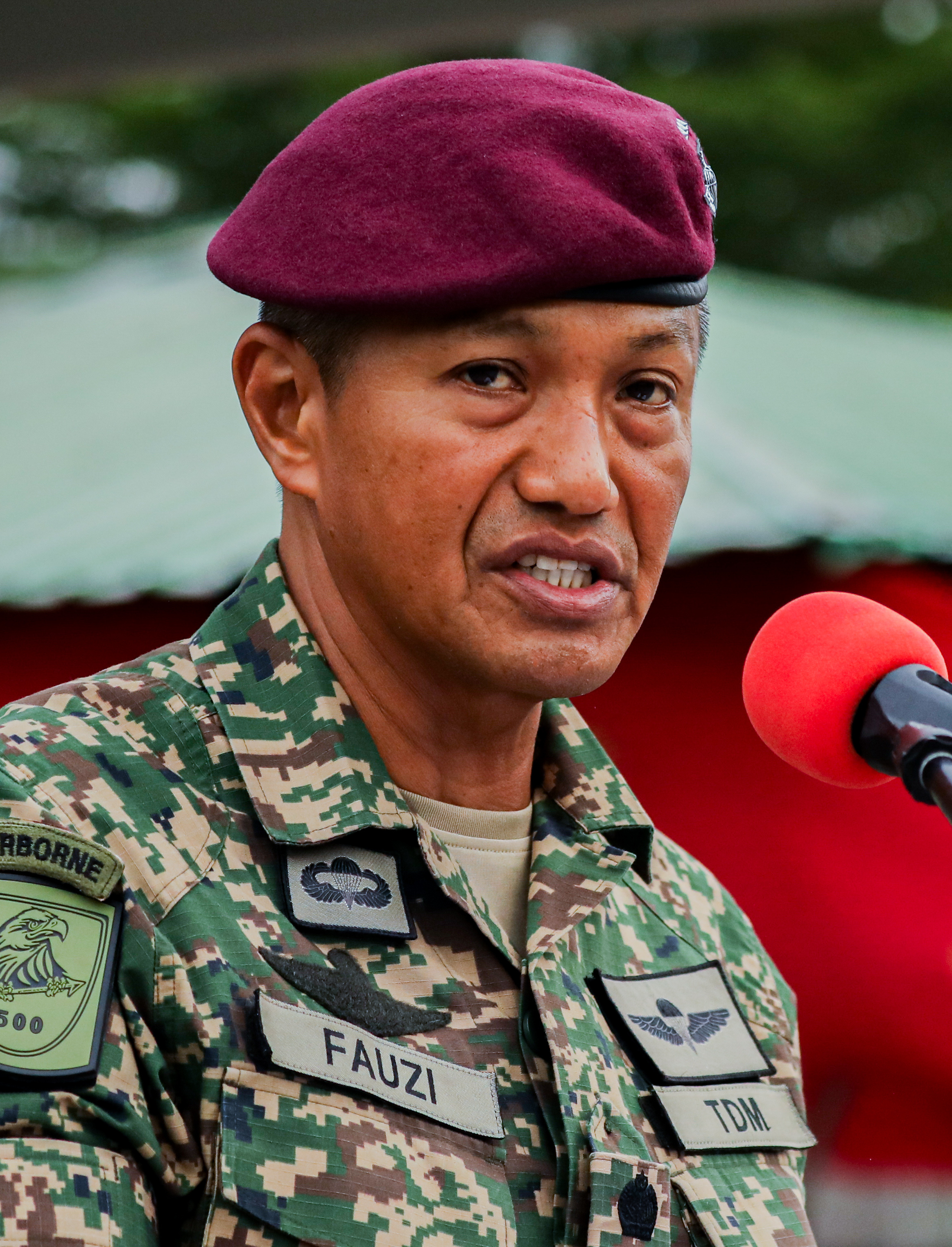
- Tengku Muhammad Fauzi in 2025

16th Joint Force Commander
- Incumbent
- Assumed office 18 January 2026
- Monarch: Ibrahim
- Minister: Mohamed Khaled Nordin
- Preceded by: Zahani Zainal Abidin

27th Deputy Chief of Army
- In office 6 September 2023 – 17 January 2026
- Chief of Army: Muhammad Hafizuddeain Jantan (2023–2026); Azhan Md Othman (2026)
- Preceded by: Muhammad Hafizuddeain Jantan
- Succeeded by: Mohamad Suria Mohamad Saad

Personal details
- Born: Tengku Muhammad Fauzi bin Tengku Ibrahim; 30 January 1970 (age 56) Kuala Terengganu
- Spouse: Haslinda Mohd Ali
- Education: Royal Military College, Kuala Lumpur

Military service
- Allegiance: Malaysia
- Branch/service: Malaysian Army
- Years of service: 1990–present
- Rank: Lieutenant General
- Unit: Royal Malay Regiment
- Battles/wars: Second Malayan Emergency

Tengku Muhammad Fauzi bin Tengku Ibrahim (Jawi: تڠکو محمد فوزي بن تڠکو ابراهيم; born 30 January 1970) is a Malaysian military officer who currently serves as the 16th Joint Force Commander since January 2026. Prior to his appointment, he previously served as the 27th Deputy Chief of Malaysian Army from September 2023 to January 2026.

== Early life and education ==
Tengku Muhammad Fauzi bin Tengku Ibrahim was born on 30 January 1970 in Kuala Terengganu. He received his secondary education at Dungun Science Secondary School, Terengganu. On 19 August 1988 he joined the Malaysian Armed Forces at the Royal Military College, Sungai Besi Camp before being selected to undergo Overseas Officer Cadet Training at the Officer Cadet School (OCS), Singapore Armed Forces Training Institute (SAFTI) in 1989. He is a graduate of the United States Army Command and General Staff College in Fort Leavenworth, Kansas, the Indonesian National Armed Forces Command and Staff College (SESKO TNI) in Bandung, Indonesia and the Royal College of Defence Studies (RCDS) in London. He is also an alumnus of Harvard Business School and has been involved in several international seminars such as the Pacific Armies Management Seminar (PAMS), Military Legal and Operation Seminar (MILOPS) and the Pacific Amphibious Leadership Symposium (PALS) and he has also attended the Asean Chief of Army Multilateral Meeting (ACAMM).

== Military career ==
He was commissioned to The 20th Battalion, Royal Malay Regiment (RAMD) in Seremban on 6 June 1990. Among the positions he held while in the 20th RAMD Battalion were Platoon Leader, 81mm Mortar Platoon Leader and also as Intelligence Officer. He has served as a Platoon Leader Branch Trainer and Adjutant at the Army Combat Training Centre (PULADA) in Johor. As a Company Leader he served in the 9th RAMD Battalion (Para) at Terendak Camp, Malacca.

At the rank of Lieutenant Colonel, he served as Commanding Officer of the 1st RAMD Battalion (Ceremonial), Military Assistant to the Chief of Army and Senior Staff Officer to the Chief Defence Forces. While as a Colonel, he served as Chief of Staff at the Headquarters of the Second Infantry Division in Penang, Military Advisor to two Ministers of Defense from 2012 to 2014. On 17 March 2016, he was promoted to Brigadier General as 17th Commander of the 10th Parachute Brigade. On 19 September 2018, he was promoted to Major General and appointed as the Assistant Chief of Defense Operations and Training Staff at the MAF Headquarters, then effective 20 July 2019 he was appointed as the Commander of the 3rd Infantry Division until 23 August 2022 before assuming office as the 23rd Commander of Army Training and Doctrine Command from 24 August 2022. He was again promoted to Lieutenant General on 18 April 2023 and was entrusted to lead as the 23rd Commander of Western Field. On top of the excellence of devotional service, he was given the trust and recognition to hold the position of the 27th Deputy Chief of Malaysian Army on 6 September 2023.

Tengku Muhammad Fauzi had been involved in border movements and had served with the Malaysian Peacekeeping Contingent (MALCON) in Bosnia Herzegovina under the NATO Stabilization Force (SFOR) in 1996 to 1997. He had also served at the Royal Military College Duntroon, Australia as an Exchange Trainer from 1998 to 1999. In addition, he has also participated in bilateral and multilateral training at home and abroad such as involvement in Ex SEMANGAT BERSATU with the Singapore Armed Forces, Ex SUMAN WARRIORS together with the Allied Armed Forces FPDA in New Zealand as well as Ex CARAT with US Marines Corps and Ex KERIS STRIKE with USARPAC, United States.

== Personal life ==
He has married with Haslinda binti Mohd Ali who comes from Johor Darul Takzim and is blessed with four children, two boys and two girls. He is an active person and enjoys sports and reading.

== Honours ==
=== Honours of Malaysia ===
- Malaysia
  - Officer of the Order of the Defender of the Realm (KMN) (2008)
  - Officer of the Order of Loyalty to the Royal Family of Malaysia (KSD) (2012)
  - Recipient of the Loyal Service Medal (PPS)
  - Recipient of the General Service Medal (PPA)
  - Recipient of the United Nations Missions Service Medal (PNBB) with "BOSNIA" clasp (1997)
  - Recipient of the 13th Yang di-Pertuan Agong Installation Medal
  - Recipient of the 14th Yang di-Pertuan Agong Installation Medal
- Malaysian Armed Forces
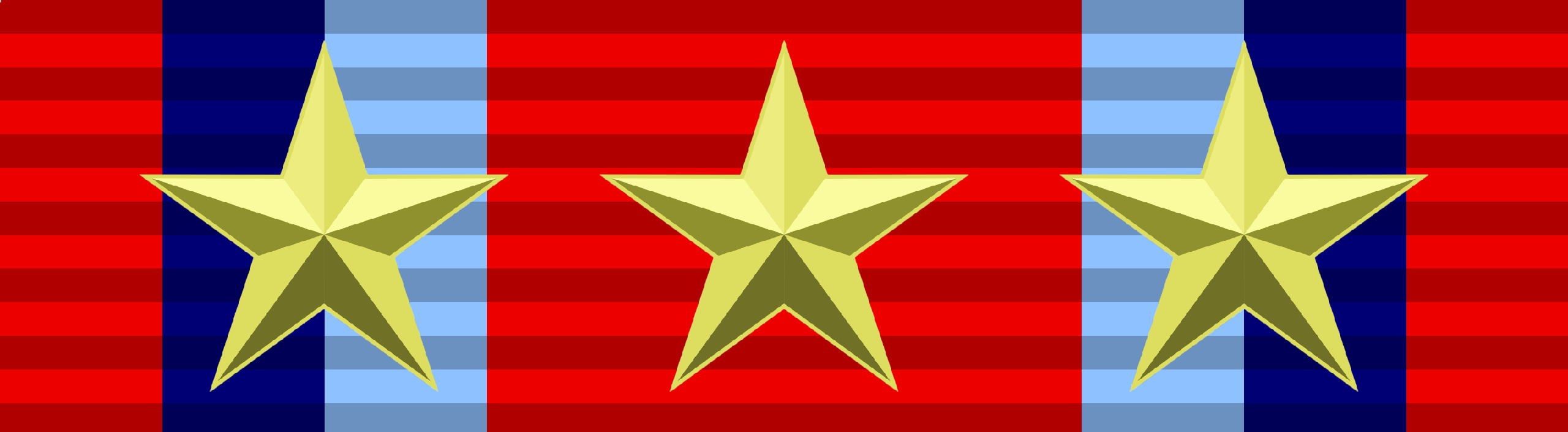
  - Loyal Commander of the Most Gallant Order of Military Service (PSAT) (2022)
  - Warrior of the Most Gallant Order of Military Service (PAT)
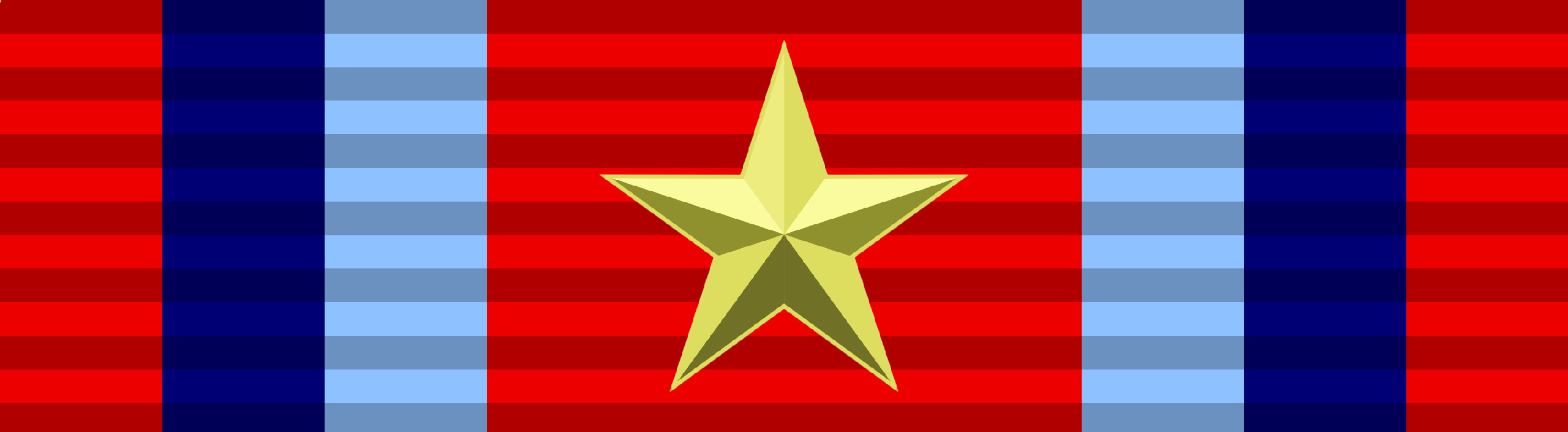
  - Officer of the Most Gallant Order of Military Service (KAT)
  - Recipient of the Malaysian Service Medal (PJM)
- Kedah
  - Knight Companion of the Order of Loyalty to the Royal House of Kedah (DSDK) – Dato' (2019)
  - Member of the Order of the Crown of Kedah (AMK) (2012)
- Malacca
  - Companion Class II of the Exalted Order of Malacca (DPSM) – Datuk (2016)
- Pahang
  - Knight Grand Companion of the Order of Sultan Ahmad Shah of Pahang (SSAP) – Dato' Sri (2026)
- Selangor
  - Knight Commander of the Order of the Crown of Selangor (DPMS) – Dato' (2016)
- Terengganu
  - Knight Companion of the Order of Sultan Mizan Zainal Abidin of Terengganu (DSMZ) – Dato' (2024)
  - Member of the Order of the Crown of Terengganu (AMT) (2014)

=== Foreign honours ===
- NATO
  - Recipient of the SFOR Medal (1997)
