= Azhan Md Othman =

31st Chief of Malaysian Army

Yang Berbahagia General Tan Sri Azhan Md Othman PGAT PSM SPKK SSAP PSAT DPKK PAT JMN KAT AMK PPS PPA PNBB PJM
- أزهان مد عثمان

31st Chief of Army
- Incumbent
- Assumed office 1 January 2026
- Monarch: Ibrahim
- Prime Minister: Anwar Ibrahim
- Minister: Mohamed Khaled Nordin
- Deputy: Tengku Muhammad Fauzi Tengku Ibrahim (2026); Mohamad Suria Mohamad Saad (2026–present)
- Preceded by: Muhammad Hafizuddeain Jantan

Chief of Staff of the Malaysian Armed Forces Headquarters
- In office 4 February 2025 – 31 December 2025
- Monarch: Ibrahim
- Prime Minister: Anwar Ibrahim
- Minister: Mohamed Khaled Nordin
- Preceded by: Arman Rumaizi Ahmad
- Succeeded by: Mohd Huzaimi Sabri

Personal details
- Born: Azhan bin Md Othman; 4 September 1969 (age 57) Muar, Johor, Malaysia
- Spouse: Noor Ainy Mohd Ali (m. 1996)
- Children: 2
- Education: Royal Military College
- Alma mater: University of Malaya (Dip)
- Occupation: Military officer

Military service
- Allegiance: Malaysia
- Branch/service: Malaysian Army
- Years of service: 1989–present
- Rank: General
- Unit: Royal Malay Regiment
- Battles/wars: Second Malayan Emergency

Azhan bin Md Othman (Jawi: أزهان بن مد عثمان; born 4 September 1969) is a Malaysian Army general officer who has served as the 31st chief of Army since 1 January 2026.

== Early life and education ==
Azhan was born on 4 September 1969 in Muar, Johor. He joined the military through officer cadet training in August 1987 after graduating his secondary education from the Royal Military College, Sungai Besi. He also graduated diploma in Strategic and Defense Studies from University of Malaya in 2002.

== Military career (1989–present) ==
Azhan attended his officer cadet training in Sungai Besi on 25 August 1987. He was commissioned into the Royal Malay Regiment on 29 July 1989 and began his service as a Platoon Leader in the 11th Battalion of the Royal Malay Regiment.

As an infantry officer, Azhan served as a staff officer and was promoted to Lieutenant Colonel on 1 May 2007 and was assigned as the commanding officer of the 24th Battalion, Royal Regiment. He was then ordered to the Armed Forces Staff College (MTAT) as the director on 14 January 2010 and subsequently attended the French Joint Defence College – War College (Ecole de Guerre) career development course at the France Military Academy from 1 January 2012 to 30 June 2013. He was previously appointed as the 2nd Commander of the Malaysian Infantry Division located in Penang before being appointed as the Assistant Chief of Staff at the Operations and Training Branch at the Army Headquarters, Ministry of Defense, Kuala Lumpur on 6 September 2024.

Later, Azhan led the Army Readiness Battalion as the commander from 1 August 2017 to 5 September 2018 and was subsequently appointed as Commander of MALBATT 850-6 from 6 September 2018 to 9 November 2019. Later, he was promoted to the commander of the 2nd Malaysian Infantry Division from 11 September 2023 to 1 September 2024 and as the Assistant Chief of Staff for Operations and Training of the Malaysian Army from 6 September 2024 to 3 February 2025. He was then entrusted to assume the position of Chief of Staff of the Malaysian Armed Forces Headquarters from 4 February 2025 to 31 December 2025.

Azhan was appointed as the Chief of the Malaysian Army starting 1 January 2026, after the incumbent Muhammad Hafizuddeain Jantan was promoted to Chief of the Malaysian Defence Force after being decided at the 631st Armed Forces Council Meeting. However, Muhammad Hafizuddeain's appointment was postponed after he was implicated in the Malaysian Army procurement corruption scandal. (Note: This scandal was exposed by the Malaysian activist, Badrul Hisham Shaharin or known as Chegubard on 23 December 2025. This scandal is currently being investigated by the Malaysian Anti-Corruption Commission (MACC).)

== Personal life ==
Azhan married Noor Ainy binti Mohd Ali on 25 May 1996 and they have two children. He is a person who enjoys reading books, watching television and playing sports in his spare time.

== Honours ==
=== Honours of Malaysia ===
- Malaysia
  - Commander of the Order of Loyalty to the Crown of Malaysia (PSM) – Tan Sri (2026)
  - Companion of the Order of the Defender of the Realm (JMN) (2023)
  - Recipient of the Loyal Service Medal (PPS)
  - Recipient of the General Service Medal (PPA)
  - Recipient of the United Nations Missions Service Medal (PNBB) with "LEBANON" clasp (2019)
  - Recipient of the 12th Yang di-Pertuan Agong Installation Medal (2001)
- Malaysian Armed Forces
  - Courageous Commander of the Most Gallant Order of Military Service (PGAT) (2026)
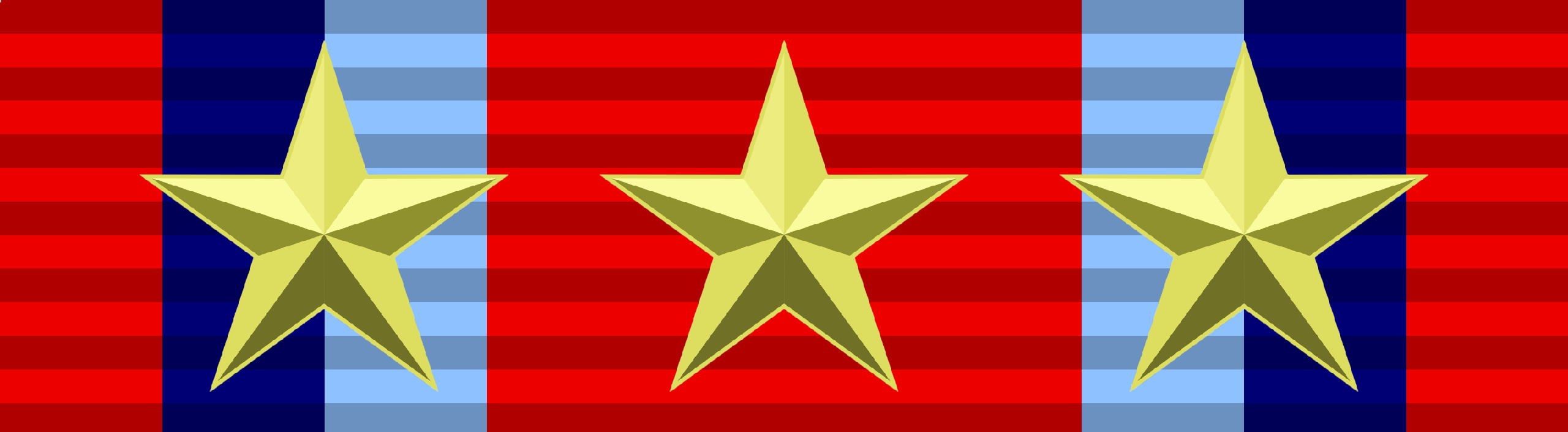
  - Loyal Commander of the Most Gallant Order of Military Service (PSAT)
  - Warrior of the Most Gallant Order of Military Service (PAT)
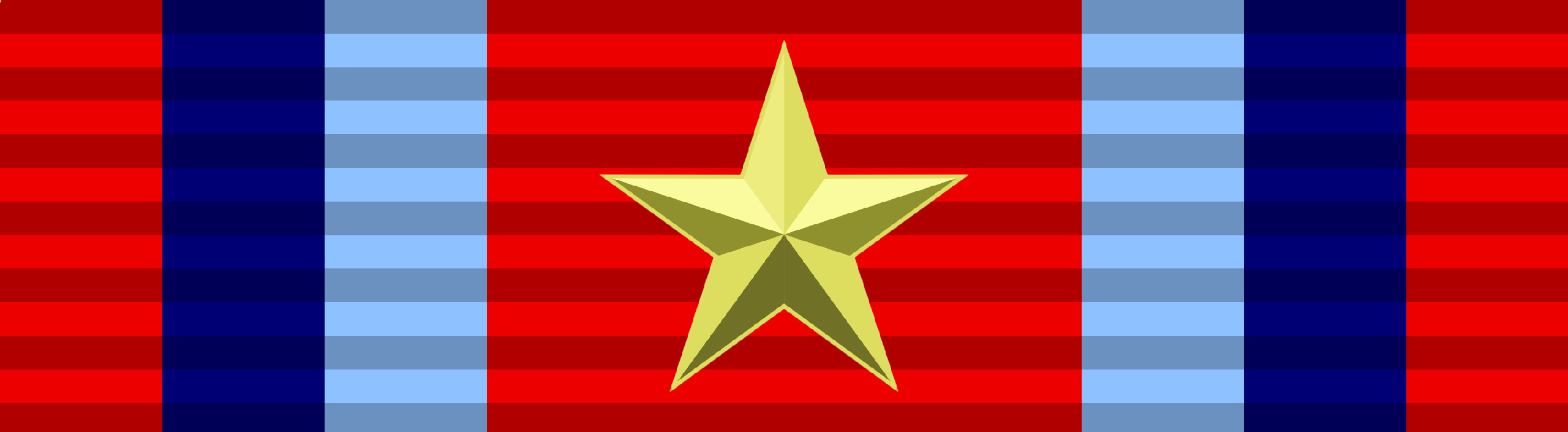
  - Officer of the Most Gallant Order of Military Service (KAT)
  - Recipient of the Malaysian Service Medal (PJM)
- Kedah
  - Member of the Order of the Crown of Kedah (AMK) (2015)
- Kelantan
  - Knight Grand Commander of the Order of the Noble Crown of Kelantan (SPKK) – Dato' (2026)
  - Knight Commander of the Order of the Noble Crown of Kelantan (DPKK) – Dato' (2023)
- Negeri Sembilan
  - Recipient of the Tuanku Ja'afar Ruby Jubilee Medal
  - Recipient of the Tuanku Muhriz Installation Medal
- Pahang
  - Knight Grand Companion of the Order of Sultan Ahmad Shah of Pahang (SSAP) – Dato' Sri (2026)

=== Foreign honours ===
- Lebanon
  - Recipient of the Military Valour Medal
- United Nations
  - Recipient of the UNIFIL Medal with "2" award numeral
