= Md Hashim Hussein =

Malaysian Army officer, diplomat and politician

Yang Berbahagia General (Rtd) Tan Sri Md Hashim Hussein PGAT PSM SPMJ SPKK SPTS PSAT DGMK DPMJ DSAP PAT KMN BCK PPA PPM PNBB

18th Chief of Army
- In office 1 January 1999 – 31 December 2002
- Preceded by: Mohd Zahidi Zainuddin
- Succeeded by: Mohd Shahrom Nordin

Personal details
- Born: 2 June 1947 (age 79) Johor Bahru, Johor, Malayan Union (now Malaysia)
- Nickname: Jack

Military service
- Allegiance: Malaysia; Yang di-Pertuan Agong
- Branch/service: Malaysian Army
- Years of service: 1963–2002
- Rank: General
- Unit: Royal Malay Regiment
- Service number: T12447

Md Hashim bin Hussein is a Malaysian retired Army officer, diplomat and politician. He served as Chief of the Malaysian Army from 1 January 1999 to 31 December 2002.

== Background ==
Md Hashim bin Hussein is born in Johor Bahru on 2 June 1947. He is the second child from nine siblings and early educated in Malay College Kuala Kangsar and Royal Military College.

== Military Education & Service ==
Md Hashim trained as a cadet in Royal Military Academy Sandhurst on 1963. Warfare knowledge is essential to him, he is also learning military techniques in Malaysia and in foreign countries in order to bring Malaysian Army to a higher standard of the time. Following are lists of his Alma mater:

- Army Intelligence Centre Woodside, Australia – 1971.
- US Army Infantry School, Fort Benning – 1975.
- Malaysian Staff College, Kuala Lumpur – 1979.
- United Kingdom Infantry School, Warminster – 1980.
- US Army Command and General Staff College, Fort Leavenworth – 1985.
- Malaysian Armed Forces Defence College, Kuala Lumpur – 1989.

In 1991, Md Hashim Hussein succeeded in acquiring a master's degree in war studies in King's College London with honours.

During his military service, he is being trusted to command the following positions:

- Instructor at the Royal Military College (Malaysia), Sungai Besi, Selangor.
- Brigade Major, 9th Infantry Brigade.
- Commanding Officer, 11th Royal Malay Regiment.
- Directing Staff, Malaysian Armed Forces Staff College.
- First Malaysian Exchange Directing Staff at the Australian Army Command and Staff College.
- Commandant, Army Training Center, Port Dickson, Negeri Sembilan.

In 1993–1994, he was appointed the Commanding Officer of United Nations Protection Force Malaysian Commander (UNPROFOR) stationed in Bosnia Herzegovina.

He is also the first Commanding Officer to the then newly created 10 Paratrooper Brigade (Malaysia).

In January 1999, he is selected as the 18th Chief of the Malaysian army.

In 2001, he is included in Induction of International Officer "Hall of Fame", United States Command and General Staff College Fort Leavenworth, USA.

After 36 years of service in the military, he retires in December 2002 with the rank of General.

== After Retirement from Military ==
Upon retiring from military service, General Md Hashim is appointed Malaysian High Commissioner to Pakistan up to year 2005.

Afterwards, he is appointed Chairman of National Authority Chemical Weapons stationed in Wisma Putra, Putrajaya till 2008.

== Politics ==
On 6 March 2013, he announced to join Parti Keadilan Rakyat (PKR) of the Pakatan Rakyat (PR) opposition coalition. In the subsequent 2013 Malaysian general election, he contested in parliamentary constituency of Johor Bahru but lost to United Malays National Organisation (UMNO)'s strongman of Barisan Nasional (BN); Shahrir Abdul Samad.

== Election results ==
Parliament of Malaysia
Year	Constituency	Candidate	Votes	Pct	Opponent(s)	Votes	Pct	Ballots cast	Majority	Turnout
2013	P160 Johor Bahru	Md Hashim Hussein (PKR)	34,014	43.32%	Shahrir Abdul Samad (UMNO)	44,509	56.68%	79,965	10,134	83.02%

== Honours ==
- Malaysia
  - Commander of the Order of Loyalty to the Crown of Malaysia (PSM) – Tan Sri (2001)
  - Officer of the Order of the Defender of the Realm (KMN) (1985)
  - Recipient of the General Service Medal (PPA)
  - Recipient of the Malaysian Commemorative Medal (Bronze) (PPM) (1965)
  - Recipient of the United Nations Missions Service Medal (PNBB) with "BOSNIA" clasp
  - Recipient of the 10th Yang di-Pertuan Agong Installation Medal
  - Recipient of the 11th Yang di-Pertuan Agong Installation Medal
  - Recipient of the 12th Yang di-Pertuan Agong Installation Medal
- Malaysian Armed Forces
  - Courageous Commander of the Most Gallant Order of Military Service (PGAT) (1999)
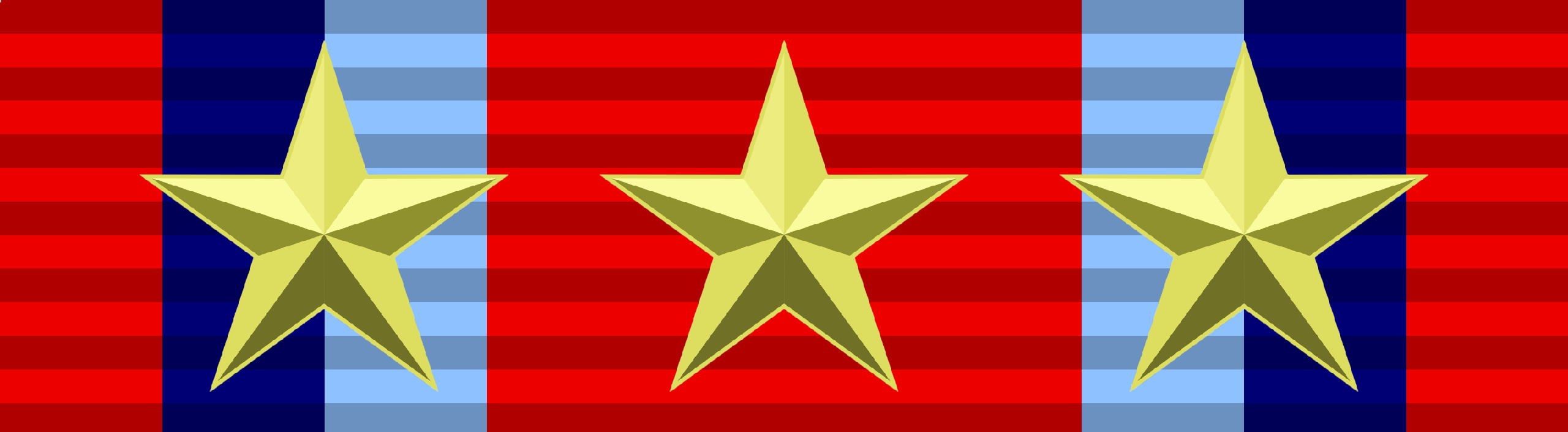
  - Loyal Commander of the Most Gallant Order of Military Service (PSAT)
  - Warrior of the Most Gallant Order of Military Service (PAT)
- Johor
  - Knight Grand Commander of the Order of the Crown of Johor (SPMJ) – Dato' (2000)
  - Knight Commander of the Order of the Crown of Johor (DPMJ) – Dato' (1998)
- Kedah
  - Knight Commander of the Glorious Order of the Crown of Kedah (DGMK) – Dato' Wira (2002)
  - State of Kedah Distinguished Service Star (BCK)
- Kelantan
  - Knight Grand Commander of the Order of the Noble Crown of Kelantan (SPKK) – Dato' (1999)
- Pahang
  - Knight Companion of the Order of Sultan Ahmad Shah of Pahang (DSAP) – Dato' (1995)
- Perak
  - Knight Grand Commander of the Order of Taming Sari (SPTS) – Dato' Seri Panglima (1999)

=== Foreign Honours ===
- Pakistan
  - Recipient of the Nishan-e-Imtiaz
- South Korea
  - Recipient of the Order of National Security Merit (Tong-il)
- Bosnia and Herzegovina
  - 1st Bosnian Golden Medal (Ljiljan)
- United States
  - Commander of the Legion of Merit (LOM) (2001)
- Indonesia
  - Bintang Kartika Paksi Utama
- France
  - Officer de I’ Ordre national du Mérite
- Thailand
  - Knight Grand Cross (First Class) of the Order of the Crown of Thailand
