= Muhammad Hafizuddeain Jantan =

Malaysian general (born 1968)

Yang Berbahagia General Tan Sri Muhammad Hafizuddeain Jantan PGAT PSM SSAP SSMZ PSAT DGMK DPKK PGDK PAT KAT BSK PPS PPA PNBB PJM
- Muhammad Hafizuddeain in 2025

30th Chief of Army
- In office 6 September 2023 – 27 December 2025
- Monarchs: Abdullah (2023–2024); Ibrahim Iskandar (since 2024)
- Minister: Mohamad Hasan (6 September–12 December 2023); Mohamed Khaled Nordin (since 2023)
- Deputy: Tengku Muhammad Fauzi Tengku Ibrahim
- Preceded by: Mohammad Ab Rahman
- Succeeded by: Azhan Md Othman

Personal details
- Born: Muhammad Hafizuddeain bin Jantan; 18 April 1968 (age 58) Segamat, Johor, Malaysia
- Education: Royal Military College, Kuala Lumpur

Military service
- Allegiance: Malaysia
- Branch/service: Malaysian Army
- Years of service: 1986–2026
- Rank: General
- Unit: Royal Malay Regiment

Muhammad Hafizuddeain bin Jantan (born 18 April 1968) is a Malaysian military officer who served as the 30th Chief of Army from September 2023 until December 2025, where he was succeeded by Azhan Md Othman. In December 2025, he was placed on leave amid an ongoing investigation by the Malaysian Anti-Corruption Commission (MACC) on charges of corruption and money laundering. He previously served as the Deputy Chief of Army from April 2023 to September 2023.

== Early life ==
Muhammad Hafizuddeain Jantan was born on 18 April 1968 in Segamat, Johor.

== Military career ==
He received his secondary education at the Royal Military College in 1985, he began his service as a cadet officer on 19 August 1986, before being commissioned as a Second Lieutenant in the 23rd Royal Malay Regiment two years later. Muhammad Hafizuddeain Jantan was promoted to Deputy Chief of Malaysian Army on 19 April 2023. Later on 6 September 2023, he was promoted to Chief of Malaysian Army, succeeding Mohammad Ab Rahman who was appointed Chief of Defence Forces.

== Corruption scandal ==
On 1 March 2025, the Ministry of Defence announced plans to reopen the tender for the leasing of UH-60 Black Hawk helicopters for the Malaysian Army. The decision followed the failure of the previous contractor, Aerotree Defence and Services Sdn Bhd, to deliver the helicopters within the agreed timeframe. The earlier leasing contract, valued at RM187 million for a five-year lease of four helicopters, had been terminated in November 2024 after repeated delivery delays despite extensions. The original procurement aimed to address utility helicopter shortages following the grounding of older S-61A Nuri helicopters. Several companies submitted proposals to supply helicopters under the new tender, with the project value and five-year lease terms maintained at RM200 million for four helicopters. The Malaysian Army emphasized that "proposals from any capable parties will be considered."

During the same period, the Malaysian Army was also expected to receive four AW149 helicopters under a broader leasing contract involving 28 helicopters over 15 years at a reported cost of RM16 billion. Delivery of the AW149 helicopters was anticipated to begin in 2027. The acquisition aimed to enhance operational airlift capacity and address capability gaps. The remaining helicopters in the programme were allocated to the Royal Malaysian Air Force, the Royal Malaysian Navy, the Royal Malaysia Police, the Fire and Rescue Department, and the Prime Minister’s Department.

In mid-2025, Hafizuddeain was widely regarded as a leading candidate for appointment as Chief of Defence Forces, with reported support from the Armed Forces Council. The Council was preparing to recommend him as the successor to Mohd Nizam Jaffar, who was scheduled to retire in 2026.

In August 2025, public attention turned to defence procurement following a royal address by King Sultan Ibrahim Iskandar during the 60th anniversary parade of the Special Operations Regiment at Kem Iskandar, Johor. The King expressed concerns regarding the proposed acquisition and leasing of older military helicopters, including UH-60 Black Hawk helicopters reportedly over 30 years old, and highlighted longstanding issues with the Nuri helicopter fleet. In his address, the King instructed MINDEF to "cancel procurements of obsolete air assets" and cautioned against "repeating previous procurement decisions, including the acquisition of used Skyhawk aircraft." He emphasized that "no compromise should be made regarding the safety and effectiveness of military assets" and expressed concern about intermediaries or former military officers involved in procurement processes, noting that such practices could lead to "inflated costs and inefficient use of defence allocations." He further stated that the acquisition of "assets that are unsuitable, excessively expensive, or misaligned with operational requirements could have implications for national security and personnel safety." Following the King’s address, the August 2025 tender for utility helicopters, including UH-60 Black Hawks, was technically left open but was effectively abandoned. Mohd Nizam announced compliance with the royal guidance, stating that the Malaysian Armed Forces "would not propose Black Hawks," honoring the King’s directive. The ministry subsequently shifted evaluations toward alternative utility helicopters, prioritizing operational safety and longer service life. No formal internal circulars or Cabinet directives were issued to halt the tender, and compliance was managed through operational leadership guidance rather than documented orders.

Despite these developments, plans for the Black Hawk lease continued to be discussed publicly. Reports in early 2025 estimated the project value at RM185 million to RM200 million for a five-year lease of four helicopters, with several private companies reportedly participating, some linked to senior army officials.

In late December 2025, Hafizuddeain was formally designated to succeed Mohd Nizam as Chief of Defence Forces following the Armed Forces Council’s approval and initial royal consent. However, his appointment was suspended amid complaints and an ongoing Malaysian Anti-Corruption Commission investigation into alleged irregularities in Malaysian Army procurement between 2023 and 2025.

On 27 December 2025, Defence Minister Mohamed Khaled Nordin placed Hafizuddeain on immediate leave. Admiral Zulhelmy Ithnain, Chief of the Royal Malaysian Navy, was appointed Acting Chief of Defence Forces by ministerial authority. By 31 December 2025, Hafizuddeain had been remanded for investigation as authorities reviewed over 158 Army projects and numerous smaller contracts for potential procurement irregularities and cartel involvement.

In early January 2026, Azhan Md Othman was appointed as the 31st Army Chief on 1 January. Hafizuddeain was questioned by MACC on 6 January. On 7 January, he and his two wives were arrested in connection with the investigation. The arrests involved 17 company directors suspected of participating in a wider procurement-related network. Hafizuddeain was remanded for seven days until 14 January, while his wives were remanded for shorter periods. During this period, MACC seized assets linked to Hafizuddeain and his family, totaling RM11.4 million. MACC Chief Azam Baki stated during a press conference on 15 January 2026 that the seizures included "RM4.4 million in cash, RM1.4 million in foreign currencies, 26 luxury watches worth RM2.3 million, jewellery and gold valued at over RM3.4 million, and a luxury vehicle valued at RM360,000." He further noted that 75 company bank accounts worth RM32.5 million had been frozen and that MACC planned to pursue forfeiture applications under Section 41 of the MACC Act 2009, in accordance with AMLA 2001 provisions, pending court approval. The assets were linked to 22 predicate offence papers related to the ongoing procurement investigation.

Following his release from remand on 14 January 2026, Hafizuddeain entered early retirement effective 1 January 2026. Defence Minister Mohamed Khaled Nordin confirmed that Hafizuddeain "submitted the early retirement request" and that this facilitated the selection of a new Chief of Defence Forces. No charges have been filed against him, and he is no longer an active officer. Admiral Zulhelmy Ithnain remains Acting Chief of Defence Forces as of mid-January 2026, pending confirmation of a permanent appointment. The ministry has announced reforms in response to the investigation, including plans to "overhaul the anti-corruption framework, review all tender processes to align with best practices, and implement stricter discipline, digitalisation, and AI for governance and transparency." These measures are scheduled for implementation in 2026 alongside existing defence budget allocations.

== Honours ==
=== Honours of Malaysia ===
- Malaysia
  - Commander of the Order of Loyalty to the Crown of Malaysia (PSM) – Tan Sri (2023)
  - Recipient of the Loyal Service Medal (PPS) (Note: Serving no less than 18 years.)
  - Recipient of the General Service Medal (PPA) (Note: Serving no less than 10 years.)
  - Recipient of the United Nations Missions Service Medal (PNBB) with "BOSNIA" clasp
  - Recipient of the 11th Yang di-Pertuan Agong Installation Medal
  - Recipient of the 12th Yang di-Pertuan Agong Installation Medal
  - Recipient of the 13th Yang di-Pertuan Agong Installation Medal
  - Recipient of the 14th Yang di-Pertuan Agong Installation Medal
  - Recipient of the 15th Yang di-Pertuan Agong Installation Medal
  - Recipient of the 17th Yang di-Pertuan Agong Installation Medal
- Malaysian Armed Forces
  - Courageous Commander of the Most Gallant Order of Military Service (PGAT) (2023)
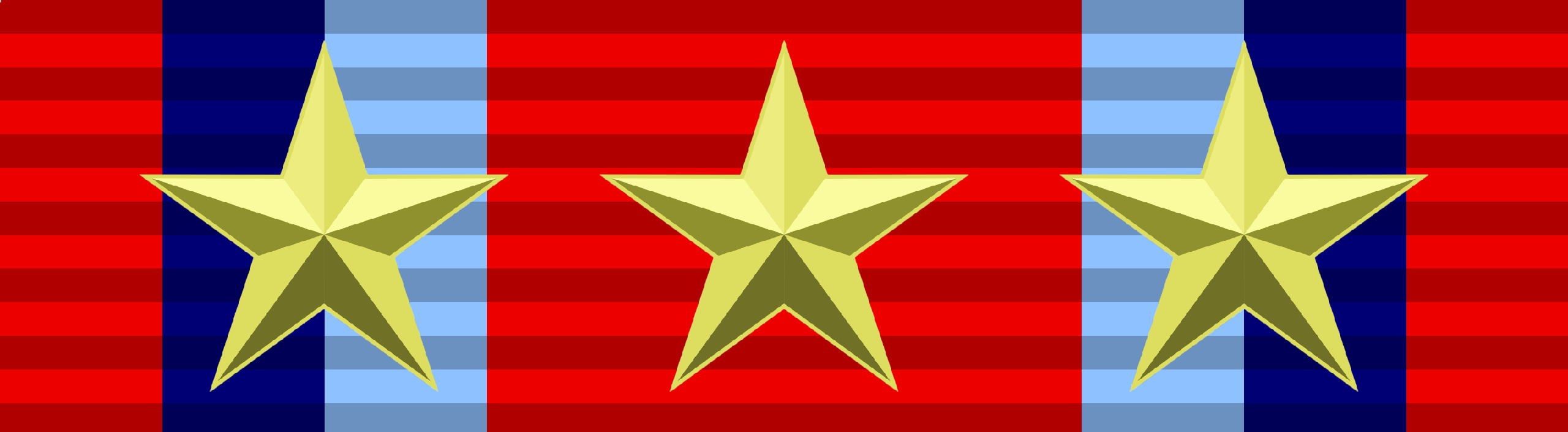
  - Loyal Commander of the Most Gallant Order of Military Service (PSAT) (2021)
  - Warrior of the Most Gallant Order of Military Service (PAT) (2014)
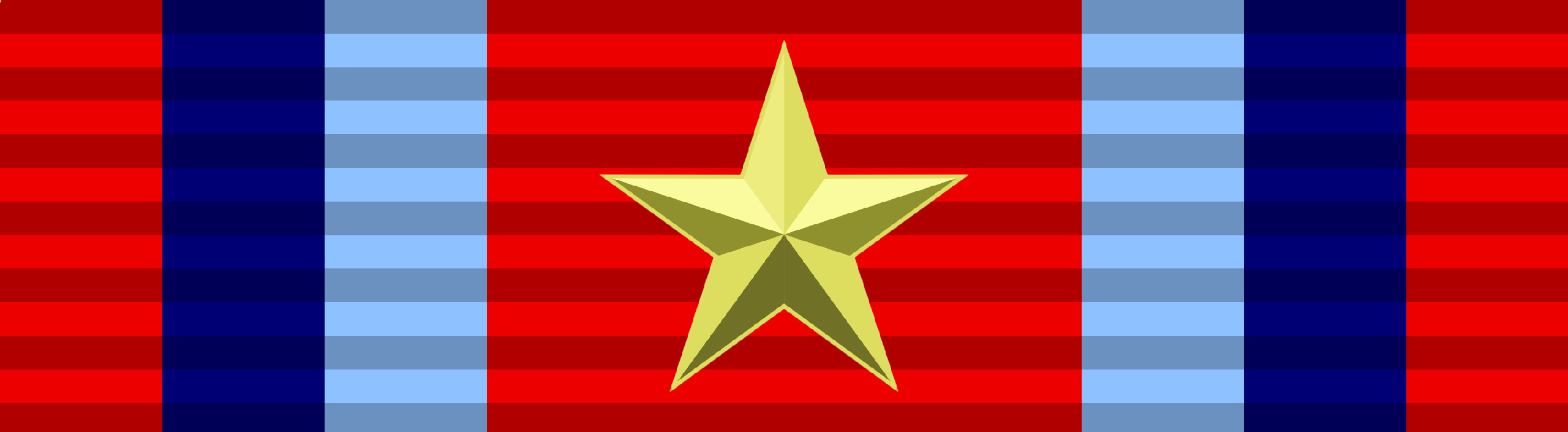
  - Officer of the Most Gallant Order of Military Service (KAT) (2004)
  - Recipient of the Malaysian Service Medal (PJM)
- Kedah
  - Knight Commander of the Glorious Order of the Crown of Kedah (DGMK) – Dato' Wira (2024)
- Kelantan
  - Knight Commander of the Order of the Noble Crown of Kelantan (DPKK) – Dato' (2023)
  - Officer of the Order of Loyalty to the Crown of Kelantan (BSK) (2010)
- Pahang
  - Knight Grand Companion of the Order of Sultan Ahmad Shah of Pahang (SSAP) – Dato' Sri (2025)
- Sabah
  - Commander of the Order of Kinabalu (PGDK) – Datuk (2019)
- Terengganu
  - Knight Grand Companion of the Order of Sultan Mizan Zainal Abidin of Terengganu (SSMZ) – Dato' Seri (2025)

=== Foreign honours ===
- Cambodia
  - Grand Cross of the Royal Order of Sahametrei (2025)
- United Nations
  - Recipient of the UNPROFOR Medal
