= Zulkifli Zainal Abidin =

Malaysian general (born 1958)

Yang Berbahagia General (Rtd) Tan Sri Dato' Seri Panglima Haji Zulkifli Zainal Abidin PGAT PMN PSM PJN SPMS SPKK SSAP SIMP DPPN DGPN SPMT SPTS SSTM PSAT DHMS DGMK DPMS DSAP DPTS PAT JSM KMN BSK AMK PPS PPA PJM PKN DPKT DUBC
- General Zulkifli in 2019

20th Chief of Defence Forces
- In office 20 June 2018 – 1 January 2020
- Prime Minister: Mahathir Mohamad
- Preceded by: Raja Mohamed Affandi Raja Mohamed Noor
- Succeeded by: Affendi Buang

24th Chief of Army
- In office 14 June 2011 – 13 June 2013
- Preceded by: Zulkifeli Mohd Zin
- Succeeded by: Raja Mohamed Affandi Raja Mohamed Noor

Personal details
- Born: 30 November 1958 (age 67) Kuala Sepetang, Larut, Perak, Federation of Malaya
- Nickname: Zul White

Military service
- Allegiance: Malaysia
- Branch/service: Malaysian Army
- Years of service: 1978-2020
- Rank: General
- Unit: Royal Malay Regiment
- Commands: Chief of Defence Forces; Chief of Army; Senior Staff Officer to the Chief of Defence Force
- Battles/wars: Communist insurgency in Malaysia (1968–89)
- Service number: T3000599

Yang Berbahagia General (Rtd) Tan Sri Dato' Seri Panglima Haji Zulkifli bin Haji Zainal Abidin (born 30 November 1958) is a Malaysian general who served as the 20th Chief of Defence Forces. He served as the Chief of Army from 14 June 2011 to 13 June 2013.

== Life and military service background ==
He was born in Kuala Sepetang, Perak, Malaysia on 30 November 1958.

He was commissioned in the Royal Malay Regiment as a Second Lieutenant in 1978, and ever since, held various commands in the Army and Armed Forces, including as the Senior Staff Officer to the Chief of Defence Force in 2001, and Vice Chancellor of the National Defence University of Malaysia from September 2008 to May 2010, and again from June 2013 to May 2018.

He also attended various courses such as the Senior Development Programme at the John F. Kennedy School of Government, Harvard University, in Cambridge, Massachusetts, holds a Master in Management from the Asian Institute of Management at Makati, Philippines, obtained an Advanced Diploma in Business and Management (Distinction) from Swansea University, University of Wales, and a diploma from the Royal College of Defence Studies (Imperial Defence College) in London. He is also an adjunct professor to the Centre of Business Innovation and Technopreneurship, in the Universiti Malaysia Perlis since 2010, and appointed professor (Professor Ikhtisas) by the National Defence University of Malaysia in 2017.

He was involved in the Communist insurgency, and served as a senior instructor at the Army Training Group and Senior Instructor at the New Zealand Army Infantry school of the New Zealand Army from 1986 to 1988, training the New Zealand Army and other Commonwealth armies in training weapons, tactics and counter insurgency warfare. He was also the Commandant of the Army Recruit Training Centre from 2002 to 2004, and was appointed the Chief of the Malaysian Army from June 2011 to June 2013.

His interests include reading about Management (Defence, Training and Human Resources Management), Defence and Security Studies (Total Defence, Counter Insurgency and Terrorism), Leadership and Development subjects, as well as taking care of orchards, fishing and hunting.

He is married to Puan Sri Datin Seri Hajjah Rusnah binti Haji A. Rahman and the couple is blessed with four children, two sons and two daughters.

== Post-military career ==
After retiring from military service, Zulkifli continues his life as a civilian without anything holding any position GLC compared to other former Chiefs of Army and Chiefs of Defence Forces as well as Chiefs of the Air Force and Chiefs of the Navy who have since retired from service.

However, on 20 January 2023, Zulkifli was appointed Chief Negotiator of the South Thailand insurgency peace process, succeeding the 5th Inspector General of Police, Tan Sri Abdul Rahim Mohd Noor who held the office for 15 years since 2008.

== Honours ==
- Malaysia :
  - Commander of the Order of the Defender of the Realm (PMN) – Tan Sri (2019)
  - Commander of the Order of Loyalty to the Crown of Malaysia (PSM) – Tan Sri (2012)
  - Commander of the Order of Meritorious Service (PJN) – Datuk (2011)
  - Companion of the Order of Loyalty to the Crown of Malaysia (JSM) (2007)
  - Officer of the Order of the Defender of the Realm (KMN) (1996)
  - Recipient of the Loyal Service Medal (PPS)
  - Recipient of the General Service Medal (PPA)
  - Recipient of the National Sovereignty Medal (PKN)
  - Recipient of the 12th Yang di-Pertuan Agong Installation Medal
  - Recipient of the 13th Yang di-Pertuan Agong Installation Medal
  - Recipient of the 14th Yang di-Pertuan Agong Installation Medal
  - Recipient of the 15th Yang di-Pertuan Agong Installation Medal
  - Recipient of the 16th Yang di-Pertuan Agong Installation Medal
- Malaysian Armed Forces :
  - Courageous Commander of the Most Gallant Order of Military Service (PGAT) (2012)
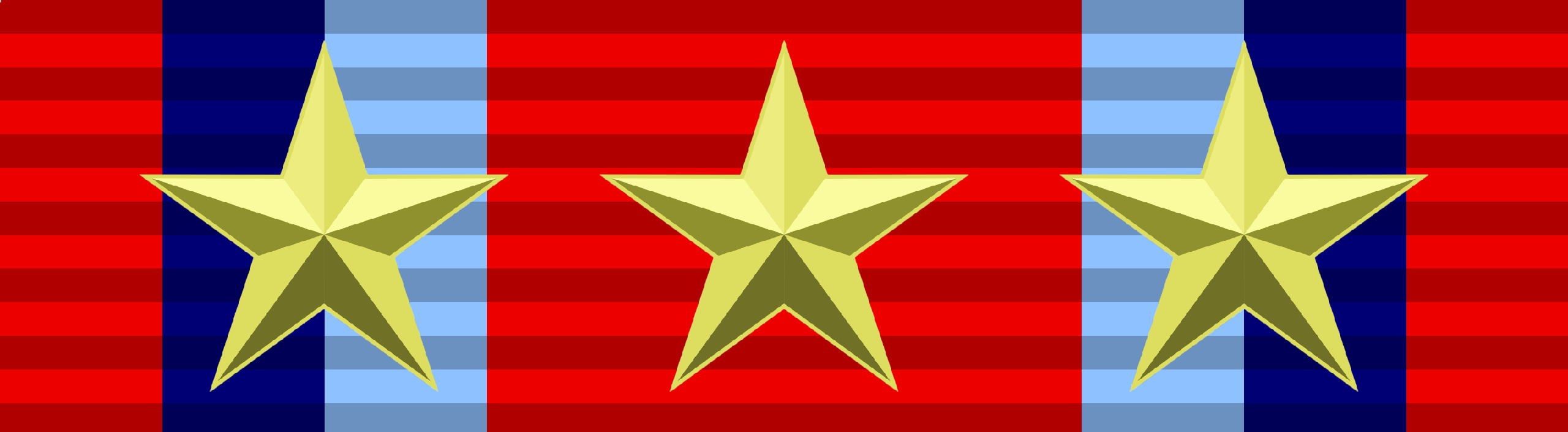
  - Loyal Commander of the Most Gallant Order of Military Service (PSAT)
  - Warrior of the Most Gallant Order of Military Service (PAT)
  - Recipient of the Malaysian Service Medal (PJM)
- Kedah :
  - Knight Commander of the Order of Loyalty to Sultan Abdul Halim Mu'adzam Shah (DHMS) – Dato' Paduka (2012)
  - Knight Commander of the Glorious Order of the Crown of Kedah (DGMK) – Dato' Wira (2011)
  - Member of the Exalted Order of the Crown of Kedah (AMK) (1998)
  - Recipient of the Sultan Sallehuddin Installation Medal (2018)
- Kelantan :
  - Knight Grand Commander of the Order of the Noble Crown of Kelantan (SPKK) – Dato' (2012)
  - Officer of the Order of Loyalty to the Crown of Kelantan (BSK)
- Negeri Sembilan :
  - Grand Knight of the Order of Loyalty to Tuanku Muhriz (SSTM) – Dato' Seri (2013)
- Pahang :
  - Knight Grand Companion of the Order of Sultan Ahmad Shah of Pahang (SSAP) – Dato' Sri (2012)
  - Grand Knight of the Order of the Crown of Pahang (SIMP) – Dato' Indera (2011)
  - Knight Companion of the Order of Sultan Ahmad Shah of Pahang (DSAP) – Dato' (2010)
- Penang :
  - Knight Commander of the Order of the Defender of State (DPPN) – Dato' Seri (2018)
  - Commander of the Order of the Defender of State (DGPN) – Dato' Seri (2012)
- Perak :
  - Knight Grand Commander of the Order of Taming Sari (SPTS) – Dato' Seri Panglima (2012)
  - Knight Commander of the Order of Taming Sari (DPTS) – Dato' Pahlawan (2007)
  - Recipient of the Sultan Nazrin Shah Installation Medal (2015)
- Selangor :
  - Knight Grand Commander of the Order of the Crown of Selangor (SPMS) – Dato' Seri (2018)
  - Knight Commander of the Order of the Crown of Selangor (DPMS) – Dato' (2012)
- Terengganu :
  - Knight Grand Commander of the Order of the Crown of Terengganu (SPMT) – Dato' (2013)

=== Foreign honours ===
- Brunei:
  - Order of Famous Valour 1st Cl – Darjah Paduka Keberanian Laila Terbilang Yang Amat Gemilang Darjah Pertama – (DPKT) which carries the title Dato Paduka Seri
- Singapore:
  - Darjah Utama Bakti Cemerlang (Tentera) – (DUBC)
- Thailand :
  - Honorary Airborne Wings - From The Royal Thai Army
