= Malaysian Army Training and Doctrine Command =

- Pemerintahan Latihan dan Doktrin Tentera Darat ڤمرينتهن لاتيهن دان دوکترين تنترا دارت
- PLDTD Emblem
- Founded: 1 January 1994; 32 years ago
- Country: Malaysia
- Branch: Malaysian Army
- Type: Training & Doctrine Command
- Garrison/HQ: Camp Segenting, Negeri Sembilan
- Nicknames: "MyTRADOC", "PLDTD"
- Mottos: Latihan Teras Keyakinan ('Training is the Core of Confidence')
- Anniversaries: 5 January

Commanders
- Current commander: Major General Datuk Marzuki Haji Mokhtar

Insignia
- Tactical formation patches

The Malaysian Army Training and Doctrine Command (MyTRADOC, Malay: Pemerintahan Latihan dan Doktrin Tentera Darat, Jawi: ڤمرينتهن لاتيهن دان دوکترين تنترا دارت), also referred to as PL&DTD or PLDTD, is a military command responsible for overseeing all training centres, facilities, and museums of the Malaysian Army. Its headquarters is currently located at Camp Segenting in Port Dickson, Negeri Sembilan, an area officially known as Bandar Tentera Darat, or "Army City" in English.

As of 18 April 2023, MyTRADOC is commanded by Major General Datuk Marzuki Haji Mokhtar, who succeeded Major General Tengku Muhammad Fauzi Tengku Ibrahim following his appointment as Commander of the Army West Field Command.

== History ==
=== Origins: First local military training unit and the 11th Strategic Division ===
The lineage of the Malaysian Army Training and Doctrine Command (MyTRADOC) can be traced back to 22 April 1953, with the formation of the 76th Federal Field Squadron, Royal Engineers. This unit was the first locally established engineering squadron, based at Camp Mereka (now Camp Mahkota) in Kluang, Johor, and placed under the Malayan Command. Its personnel were divided into two groups: an engineering training detachment and a field operations unit. These members received their training under the British Army at Camp Nee Soon in the Colony of Singapore and at Camp Mereka.

In early 1957, shortly before the Federation of Malaya gained independence, the squadron was disbanded. Its members were absorbed into a newly established regiment known as the Federation of Malaya Engineers Regiment, also referred to as the Federation Engineers (now Royal Army Engineers Regiment). The engineering training detachment is regarded as the origin of the Malaysian Army's training system, as the majority of its personnel were local Malaysians who were trained to become instructors and trainers.

On 2 May 1984, the 11th Reserve Army Division was restructured and redesignated as the 11th Strategic Division. Headquartered at Camp Imphal in Kuala Lumpur, the division was tasked with a strategic defence role. This included developing and planning military doctrine, testing strategies, and improving logistics in order to enhance the combat capabilities of the Malaysian Army during both conflict and peacetime. The 11th Strategic Division is considered the closest predecessor to the current MyTRADOC in terms of its responsibilities.

=== Establishment of the Malaysian Army Training and Doctrine Command ===
On 31 December 1993, the 11th Strategic Division was officially disbanded to make way for a larger and more comprehensive command structure. The Malaysian Army Training and Doctrine Command, commonly known as MyTRADOC, was officially established on 1 January 1994. It was formed using the remaining staff, assets, and facilities of the former 11th Strategic Division. Initially, MyTRADOC remained based at Camp Imphal in Kuala Lumpur.

In 2010, the command was relocated to Camp SiRusa in Port Dickson. Four years later, in 2014, it was moved again to Camp Segenting, Port Dickson, where it continues to be headquartered today.

Currently, the organisation of MyTRADOC consists of three main departments: the Bahagian Pengurusan Am (General Management Department), the Bahagian Pengurusan Latihan (Training Management Department), and the Bahagian Pembangunan Doktrin (Doctrine Development Department).

== Roles ==
The Malaysian Army Training and Doctrine Command is currently responsible for five main roles:

- Planning and formulating operational doctrine for the Malaysian Army.
- Coordinating training institutions across the Malaysian Army.
- Evaluating the effectiveness of training programmes and policies.
- Developing human capital through structured and systematic training.
- Conducting basic, advanced, and specialised military courses.

== Structure ==
As of 2025, the Malaysian Army Training and Doctrine Command oversees a number of subordinate entities. These include a support company, several military training centres, Reserve Officer Training Units (ROTU) based in various universities and institutions of higher learning, a military medical centre, and a military dentistry centre.

The entities under its command are as follows:

- Army Institutes and training centres
  1. Institut Pegawai Kanan Tentera Darat (INSPEKA, Army Senior Officers Institute)
  2. Akademi Tentera Darat (ATD, Malaysian Army Academy)
  3. Pusat Latihan Asas Tentera Darat (PUSASDA, Army Basic Training Centre)
  4. Pusat Latihan Tempur Tentera Darat (PULADA, Army Combat Training Centre)
  5. Pusat Latihan Peperangan Khusus (PULPAK, Special Warfare Training Centre)
  6. Pusat Latihan Muzik Tentera Darat (PUZIDA, Malaysian Army School of Music)
  7. Pusat Latihan Askar Wataniah (PUSWATAN, Territorial Army Training Centre)
  8. Pusat Latihan Armor (PULAMOR, Armoured Training Centre)
  9. Institut Komunikasi Dan Elektronik Tentera Darat (IKED, Army Institute of Communications and Electronics)
  10. Institut Kejuruteraan Medan Tentera Darat (IKEM, Army Field Engineering Institute)
  11. Pusat Latihan Artileri (PUSARTI, Artillery Training Centre)
  12. Pusat Latihan Kor Polis Tentera Diraja (PULAPOT, Royal Military Police Corps Training Centre)
  13. Pusat Latihan Kor Perkhidmatan Diraja (PULMAT, Royal Logistics Corps Training Centre)
  14. Pusat Latihan Kor Ordnans (PULNORD, Ordnance Corps Training Centre)
  15. Institut Kejuruteraan Tentera Darat (IJED, Army Institute of Engineering)
  16. Pusat Latihan Mekanis (PULAMEK, Mechanised Training Centre)
- Pasukan Latihan Pegawai Simpanan (PALAPES, Reserve Officers Training Unit — ROTU)
  1. National University of Malaysia ROTU
  2. University of Malaya ROTU
  3. Universiti of Putra Malaysia ROTU
  4. Universiti Teknologi MARA ROTU
  5. Universiti Sains Malaysia ROTU
  6. Universiti Utara Malaysia ROTU
  7. Universiti Teknologi MARA, Arau Campus ROTU
  8. Universiti Teknologi MARA, Dungun Campus ROTU
  9. University of Technology Malaysia ROTU
  10. Universiti Malaysia Sabah ROTU
  11. Universiti Malaysia Sarawak ROTU
  12. Sultan Idris Education University ROTU
  13. Universiti Teknologi MARA, Malacca Branch ROTU (Note: This ROTU unit covers two campuses: UiTM Bandaraya Melaka Campus and UiTM Alor Gajah (Lendu) Campus, both located in Malacca.)
  14. Tun Hussein Onn University of Malaysia ROTU
  15. Universiti Malaysia Perlis ROTU
  16. National Defence University of Malaysia ROTU
  17. Universiti Malaysia Pahang Al-Sultan Abdullah ROTU
  18. International Islamic University Malaysia ROTU
  19. Malaysian Maritime Academy ROTU
  20. Universiti Sultan Zainal Abidin ROTU
  21. Universiti Malaysia Terengganu ROTU
  22. Universiti Sains Islam Malaysia ROTU
  23. Universiti Teknikal Malaysia Melaka ROTU
  24. Universiti Malaysia Kelantan ROTU
- 603th Military Dentistry Centre
- 808th Military Medical Centre
- Nucleus Composite Company

== Commander ==
Name	Year	Notes
Major General Dato' Mohd Alias Lafti bin Tan Sri Haji Hussein	1 January 1994 – 24 January 1994	
Major General Dato' Mohd Ramli bin Ismail	25 January 1994 – 15 April 1996	
Major General Dato' Paduka Ghazali bin Ibrahim	16 April 1996 – 8 December 1996	
Major General Dato' Mohd Zahidi bin Haji Zainuddin	9 December 1996 – 29 June 1997	
Major General Dato' Mohd Shahrom bin Dato' Haji Nordin	30 June 1997 – 1 December 1997	
Major General Dato' Abdul Aziz bin Mansur	2 December 1997 – 1 March 1999	
Major General Dato' Abdul Wahid bin Haji Anwar	2 March 1999 – 21 June 2000	
Major General Dato' Amir bin Baharudin	22 June 2000 – 8 January 2001	
Major General Dato' Mohd Amin bin Md Salleh	9 January 2001 – 20 May 2001	
Major General Dato' Tengku Ariffin bin Tengku Mohammed	21 May 2001 – 21 February 2003	
Major General Dato' Khalid bin Saad	22 February 2003 – 30 September 2004	
Major General Dato' Ahmad Rodi bin Zakaria	1 October 2004 – 15 July 2005	
Major General Dato' Mokhtar bin Perman	16 July 2005 – 23 December 2009	
Major General Dato' Che Hasni bin Che Ahmad	24 December 2009 – 4 July 2010	
Major General Dato' Abdul Rahim bin Haji Mohd Yusuff	5 July 2010 – 15 December 2013	
Major General Dato' Suhaimi Haji Mohd Zuki	16 December 2013 – 12 January 2016	
Major General Dato' Paduka Tengku Ahmad Noor Tuan Chik	13 January 2016 – 6 April 2017	
Major General Dato' Wira Md Tajri bin Alwi	7 April 2017 – 8 April 2019	
Major General Dato' Hj Mohd Nazir bin Hj Mami	23 April 2019 – 24 July 2019	
Major General Dato' Mohammad bin Ab Rahman	25 July 2019 – 10 June 2020	
Major General Dato' Nazari bin Abdul Hadi	11 June 2019 – 23 August 2022	
Major General Dato' Tengku Muhammad Fauzi bin Tengku Ibrahim	24 August 2022 – 18 April 2023	
Major General Datuk Marzuki bin Hj Mokhtar	19 April 2023 – Present	
