= Joint Force Headquarters (Malaysia) =

Joint military command of the Malaysian Armed Forces

Joint Forces Headquarters
- Markas Angkatan Bersama مركس اڠكتن برسام
- Founded: 6 September 2004 (22 years ago)
- Country: Malaysia
- Branch: Malaysian Army; Royal Malaysian Navy; Royal Malaysian Air Force
- Type: Joint Forces Operational Level Command
- Role: Planning and implementing all joint operations involving all three branches of Malaysian Armed Forces at national and international levels
- Size: 972 (July 2012)
- Part of: Ministry of Defence; Malaysian Armed Forces
- Garrison/HQ: JFHQ Complex, Al Sultan Abdullah Camp, Pahang
- Nicknames: "MAB", "PAB", "MK AB", "JFHQ", "Purple Force"
- Motto: Berjuang Bersama (Fight Together)
- Colours: Purple
- Anniversaries: 16 July
- Engagements: Malbatt – UNIFIL; Malcoy – UNIFIL; Malcon – ISAF; IMT – Mindanao
- Website: jointforces.mil.my

Commanders
- Current commander: Lieutenant General Dato’ Tengku Muhammad Fauzi Tengku Ibrahim

The Joint Forces Headquarters (Abbr.: JFHQ, Malay: Markas Angkatan Bersama — MAB, Jawi: مركس اڠكتن برسام) is a joint military command which specifically formed to command all tasks of the Malaysian Armed Forces joint operations. The Joint Operations are other operations performed by at least three services such as Malaysian Army, Royal Malaysian Navy and the Royal Malaysian Air Force.

The JFHQ, currently led by Lieutenant General Dato’ Tengku Muhammad Fauzi Tengku Ibrahim as the Joint Forces Commander (Malay: Panglima Angkatan Bersama), succeeding Lt Gen Dato' Pahlawan Zahani Hj Zainal Abidin RMAF on 18 January 2026. The commander is responsible for planning and implementing all the joint and combined operations, joint exercises and Multi-National Operations, such as the United Nations (UN) peacekeeping missions. The JFHQ as like any other joint forces adopts the assigned concept.

== History ==
=== Establishment of JFHQ ===
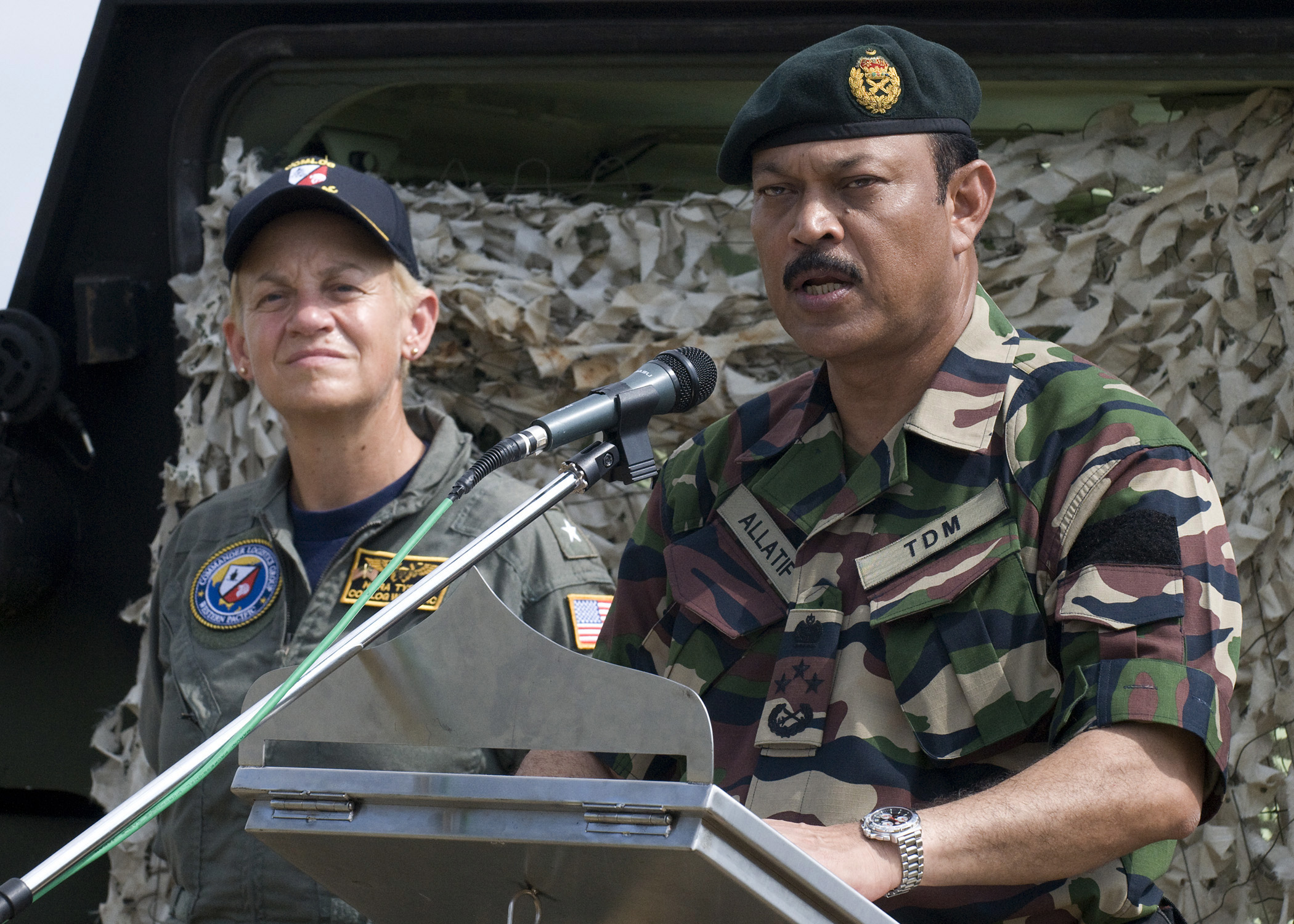
Lieutenant General Dato' Allatif Mohd Noor, the 1st Joint Forces Commander, gives a closing speech during the CARAT Malaysia 2009 closing ceremony.

The Joint Force Headquarters (JFHQ) was first proposed on 20 April 2004, and officially launched on 6 September 2004, by Najib Razak, who was then the Deputy Prime Minister and Minister of Defence. The establishment of JFHQ was aimed at fulfilling the needs of a dedicated Joint Force Command for the Malaysian Armed Forces (MAF). Initially, Vice Admiral Dato’ Ramlan Mohamed Ali, the Chief of Staff of the MAF Headquarters, was appointed as the JFHQ Commander on an ad hoc basis. Lieutenant General Datuk Hj Shahron Hj Ibrahim RMAF subsequently appointed a permanent JFHQ Commander, effective 1 December 2006.

Once the JFHQ was officially established, Major General Dato' Allatif Mohd Noor assumed command. With a total strength of 312 officers and personnel, this command has since carried out the responsibilities outlined by the "Jointness" concept, enabling the three services of the MAF to work together effectively to support the Chief of Defence Forces in governance and control operations at the highest levels.

JFHQ operates as the primary operational command for joint missions, coordinating and implementing combined and multinational operations, including those under the United Nations (UN) charter. It is also tasked with overseeing all joint training and exercises. Beyond current operations, JFHQ provides strategic input for future capability development. Given budgetary constraints, the headquarters is focused on a "fit for purpose" approach, aiming to establish capabilities that meet essential requirements while promoting balanced development and interoperability. This approach ensures that future capabilities are both effective in operation and optimized for budgetary efficiency.

In addition to current operations, JFHQ continues to address the need for sustainable capability development to maximize effectiveness and budget utilization, all while supporting interoperability across services.

=== Timeline ===
20 April 2004 – Its establishment was approved by the Malaysian Armed Forces Council during the council's 340th meeting.

6 September 2004 – The JFHQ was launched by the Deputy Prime Minister cum Minister of Defence, Najib Razak.

16 July 2007 – Officially established after has been approved by the Public Service Department.

19 July 2012 – The JFHQ has been recognised by the UN.

25 June 2019 – The HQ for JFHQ was relocated from the Wisma Pertahanan, Kuala Lumpur to a newly built 39 ha (0.15 mi^{2}) facility, the JFHQ Complex, located at Sungai Panching Camp in Kuantan, Pahang.

== Roles ==
The role of JFHQ as an Operational Level Command is to plan and execute all joint operations, including combined, integrated, and multinational missions, such as those conducted under the UN Charter.

== Functions ==
1. Serve as the Operational Headquarters, responsible for the command, control, and management of assigned forces to carry out joint and combined operations.
2. Plan and conduct integrated exercises for assigned forces to support joint and combined operations.
3. Establish situational awareness for joint and combined operations.
4. Develop and update the doctrine and Standing Operating Procedures (SOP) for joint warfare.
5. Plan and execute all joint operations at bilateral and multilateral levels.
6. Deploy and manage all military personnel serving under the charter of the United Nations (UN).

== Organizational structure ==
The JFHQ is led by Joint Forces Commander and supported by Joint Forces Chief-of-Staff. Under them, there is eight main divisions.

=== Joint Forces Commander ===
Also known as the Chief of Joint Forces, or Panglima Angkatan Bersama (PAB) in Malay, the PAB oversees all joint forces and reports directly to the Minister of Defence and the Chief of Defence Forces. The PAB holds a three-star rank and is chosen from among the three branches of the Malaysian Armed Forces (MAF).

=== Joint Forces Chief-of-Staff ===
Known as Ketua Staf Angkatan Bersama (KS MK AB) in the Malay Language, the KS MK AB is a two-star rank selected between all three branches of MAF.

=== J1 – Human Resources Division ===
The J1 division is responsible for managing joint force personnel, including the distribution and individual management of assigned forces. This covers areas such as discipline, morale, welfare, religious services, and legal matters, both in peacetime and wartime. A senior officer leads the J1 division, typically holding the rank of Colonel in the army and air force or Captain in the navy.

The division comprises three departments:

- Human Resources Department
- Religious Service Department
- Legislation Department

=== J2 – Intelligence Division ===
The J2 Intelligence Division is responsible for conducting intelligence operations during both peace and wartime, as well as developing devices to support intelligence activities that meet Joint Force requirements. This division reports daily intelligence updates to the Defence Operation Centre (Malay: Pusat Operasi Pertahanan — POP) and is led by a senior officer, typically holding the rank of Colonel or the navy equivalent. J2 is also tasked with conducting intelligence awareness briefings and performing physical patrols in sensitive Joint Force areas to prevent potential information leaks.

In addition, J2 facilitates intelligence exchanges with foreign intelligence agencies and other Malaysian government agencies. It also plays a role in the Sabah-based Joint Intelligence Working Group (JIWG), a multi-agency intelligence collaboration.

The J2 Division oversees the following departments:

- Regional Intelligence Cell / International Intelligence Unit
- Domestic Intelligence Cell
- Counter-intelligence / Security Cell
- Psychological Warfare Cell

=== J3 – Joint Operation Division ===
The J3 Division is one of the largest divisions within the JFHQ, led by a two-star officer and supported by a one-star rank. The division is organised into four specialised cells:

==== Cell A – Domestic Operations ====
This cell is responsible for monitoring all Malaysian Armed Forces (MAF) domestic, joint, combined, and integrated operations. It also oversees standalone operations conducted by any branch of the MAF.

==== Cell B – Global Operations ====
This cell assesses MAF involvement in United Nations (UN) Peacekeeping Operations, including roles such as UN Military Observer, UN Battalions, UN HQ Staff, and UN Technical Staff. It also offers opportunities for MAF personnel to serve as Military Observer Officers or Liaison Officers within the United Nations Department of Peacekeeping Operations (UNDPKO) in New York or in any UN-led operations.

==== Joint Exercise Department ====
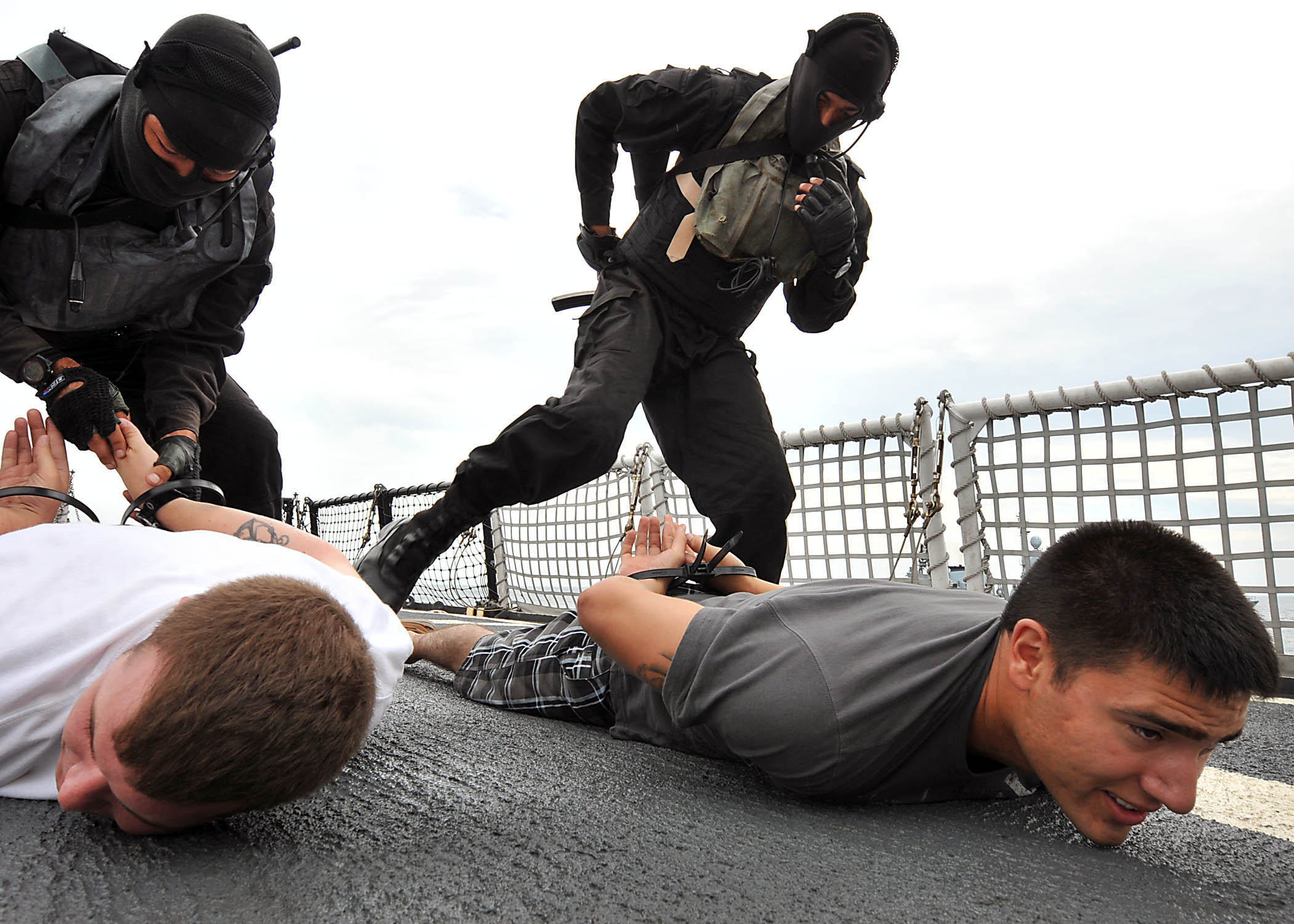
During the 2010 SEACAT demonstrations with the US Coast Guard, PASKAL commandos restrained the suspects by flex-cuffing them.

This department is responsible for conducting joint and combined exercises between the Malaysian Armed Forces and foreign military forces. It plans, coordinates, and adjusts all Exercise Planning Meetings (Malay: Mensyuarat Perancangan Eksesais), serving as the secretariat for joint and combined exercises.

==== Cell D – Special Forces Operations ====
This cell is tasked with planning, coordinating, executing, and monitoring all special operations involving two or more branches of the MAF. It also coordinates all MAF requirements for special operations.

=== J4 – Logistic Support Division ===
The J4 Division is led by a one-star officer and is composed of four key departments:

Logistic Planning Department

This department is responsible for providing logistical support for joint and combined operations and exercises, both within Malaysia and overseas, involving the Malaysian Armed Forces (MAF) and foreign military forces.

Materials Support Department

This department handles the provision and coordination of logistical support for joint and combined forces. It also acts as the coordinator for supplying logistical needs to the assigned forces involved in joint/combined operations and exercises, ensuring the proper raising, training, and maintenance of their personnel.

Transportation Department

This department plans and manages transportation and mobility resources for joint and combined operations and exercises. It coordinates all transportation—whether air, land, or sea—using MAF, private, or foreign sources for both domestic and international operations and exercises.

Financial Department

This department is responsible for securing the budget and processing all financial requirements related to operations, exercises, and any associated activities, such as allowances for MAF personnel on duty under the United Nations (UN).

=== J5 – Planning and Development Division ===
The J5 Division is responsible for draughting policies related to joint military operations. It is also tasked with formulating defence contingency plans for the Malaysian Armed Forces (MAF) at the operational level, involving all three branches of MAF, Malaysian government agencies, and foreign agencies. The J5 Division is led by a two-star officer and is composed of two departments:

- Department of Planning
- Department of Development

=== J6 – Joint Communication and Electronics Division ===
In charge of supplying the communications for all MAF operations. The J6 also tasked to coordinate the needs of Electronics and Cyber Warfare. The J6 is led by a one-star rank.

=== J7 – Joint Exercise Division ===
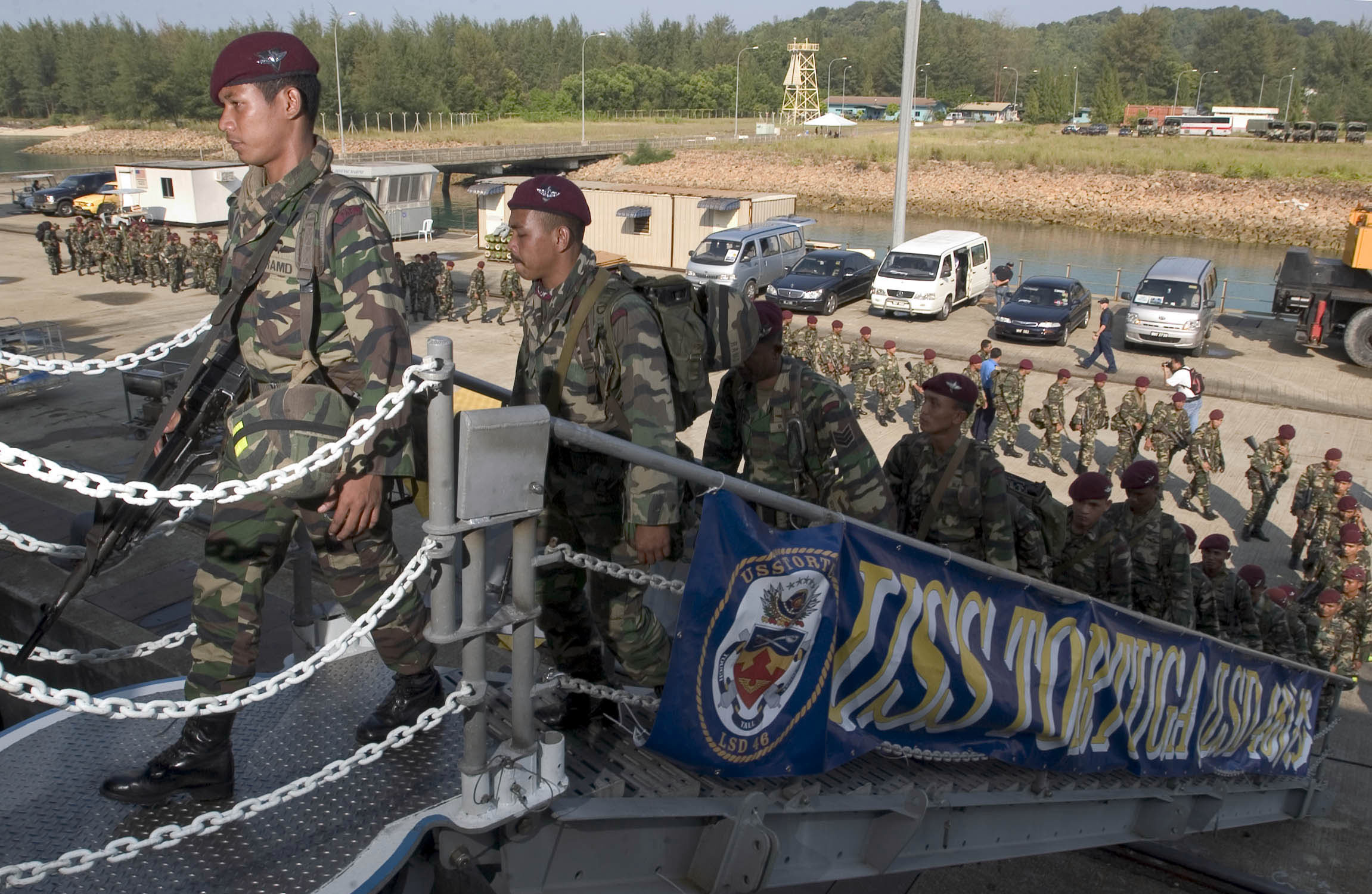
Paratroopers from the 10th Parachute Brigade boarded the USS Tortuga (LSD 46) to participate in a joint amphibious landing during the 2006 CARAT exercise.

In charge of handling and execute the large scale joint exercise between all three branches of MAF and large scale combined exercise between the MAF and military of friendly nations. Led by a one-star rank, the J7 is composed of two cells:

Joint Exercise Cell

Responsible for developing and overseeing the planning of joint military operations and defence strategies.

Combined Exercise Cell

Focused on the development of long-term defence capabilities, policies, and frameworks to support MAF operations and collaborations.

=== J9 – Military Health Division ===
The J9 Division is responsible for monitoring and coordinating health affairs for Ops Pasir and other Malaysian Armed Forces (MAF) overseas missions.

== Field Training Exercises ==
The following are some of the exercises handled and executed by the JFHQ's J7:

=== Aman Youyi ===
Exercise Aman Youyi is a bilateral military exercise between the Malaysian Armed Forces (MAF) and the Chinese People's Liberation Army. It has been held annually since 2014. In the 2018 edition, the Royal Thai Armed Forces also participated in the exercise.

=== Bersama Shield ===
Bersama Shield is a multilateral military exercise involving the five countries of the Five Power Defence Arrangements (FPDA): Australia, Malaysia, New Zealand, Singapore, and the United Kingdom. The exercise is held annually in Malaysia and Singapore.

=== Bersama Warrior ===
Bersama Warrior is an annual joint bilateral exercise between Malaysia and the United States, aimed at developing and improving their collective ability to plan and conduct joint and combined operations. It focuses on non-combatant evacuation operations (NEO), personnel recovery (PR), counter-terrorism (CT), maritime security, and humanitarian support operations.

=== CARAT Malaysia ===
The Cooperation Afloat Readiness and Training (CARAT) exercise is a series of annual bilateral military exercises conducted by the United States Pacific Fleet with ASEAN member nations in Southeast Asia. The MAF has been part of Exercise CARAT since 1995. The Malaysian iteration, known as CARAT Malaysia, focuses on strengthening the capabilities of the Royal Malaysian Navy (RMN) and MAF maritime assets, as well as enhancing cooperation between the RMN, the U.S. Navy, and the U.S. Marines.

=== Cobra Gold ===
Exercise Cobra Gold is the largest military exercise in the Asia-Pacific region, hosted by the Royal Thai Armed Forces and the United States Indo-Pacific Command. Held annually in Thailand, it involves seven nations, including Malaysia.

=== Joint Combined Exercise Thailand Malaysia ===
The Joint Combined Exercise Thailand-Malaysia (JCEX THAMAL) is a bilateral military exercise between Malaysia and Thailand. It focuses on operations during natural disasters and involves disaster relief NGOs and teams, such as SMART. The exercise is held in northern Malaysia.

=== Malindo Darsasa ===
Latihan Gabungan Bersama Darat Samudera Angkasa Malaysia-Indonesia (transl. Combined Joint Exercise Land-Sea-Air) (Latgabma Malindo Darsasa) is a bilateral military exercise between Malaysia and Indonesia. The exercise, held every three years, focuses on cooperation between the two nations' militaries in the event of a disaster, whether war or natural.

=== Tiger Strike ===
Exercise Tiger Strike is a bilateral military exercise between Malaysia and the United States focused on amphibious operations. It is designed to familiarise the 7th and 22nd Battalions, Royal Malay Regiment, with amphibious landings, improving communication and coordination during amphibious operations. The exercise prepares the battalions for marine infantry roles and potential attachment to the U.S. Marine Corps. The Royal Malaysian Air Force and Naval Special Forces (PASKAL) from the RMN also support the exercise.

== Operations ==
=== Operation Pasir ===
On the local front, the Joint Forces Headquarters (JFHQ) is responsible for implementing Operation Pasir, which covers the protection of Pandanan Island and Sipadan Island in East Sabah. This is a joint operation involving the assets of all three branches of the Malaysian Armed Forces (MAF), conducted in the East Sabah area under the command of the Joint Task Force 2 Commander.

The operational area for Operation Pasir spans the entire east coast of Sabah, from Kudat to Semporna. It includes the waters of the Malaysian Exclusive Economic Zone (EEZ) and Sabah's airspace, which borders the South China Sea, Sulu Sea and the Sulawesi Sea to the east. The main mission of Operation Pasir is to ensure a safe and secure environment in the East Coast of Sabah, to protect national sovereignty, and to create conditions conducive to economic activity.

=== Operation Daratan ===
Operation Daratan (lit. 'Operation Inland') is similar to Operation Pasir but focuses on the inland areas of East Sabah. It involves two additional battalions stationed in the region, bringing the total number of battalions involved in both operations to five. Three of these five battalions are special operations battalions, contributing to the mission's success.

=== Overseas Operations ===
The Malaysian Armed Forces (MAF) has increasingly extended its presence internationally through various peacekeeping missions, enhancing Malaysia's image globally. MAF personnel involved in United Nations (UN) missions have demonstrated exceptional ability, dedication, commitment, and discipline.

Some of the key overseas missions undertaken by the MAF include:

1. United Nations Interim Force in Lebanon (UNIFIL)
2. Operation of Interim National Support and Assistance to Afghanistan (Op INSAF)
3. International Monitoring Team – Mindanao

== List of Joint Forces Commanders ==
Temporary Commanders

No.	Portrait	Temporary Joint Force Commander	Took office	Left office	Time in office	Defence branch	Ref.
1	Dato’ Ramlan Mohamed Ali	Vice Admiral; Dato’ Ramlan Mohamed Ali	6 September 2004	August 2005	329 days	Royal Malaysian Navy	
2	Dato’ Shahron Ibrahim RMAF	Lieutenant General; Dato’ Shahron Ibrahim RMAF	1 December 2006	September 2007	274 days	Royal Malaysian Air Force	

Commanders

No.	Portrait	Joint Force Commander	Took office	Left office	Time in office	Defence branch	Ref.
1	Dato' Wira Allatif Mohd Noor	Lieutenant General; Dato' Wira Allatif Mohd Noor	1 October 2007	21 May 2010	2 years, 232 days	Malaysian Army	
2	Dato' Wira Jamil Osman	Vice Admiral; Dato' Wira Jamil Osman	21 May 2010	13 April 2011	327 days	Royal Malaysian Navy	
3	Datuk Ahmad Kamarulzaman Ahmad Badaruddin	Vice Admiral; Datuk Ahmad Kamarulzaman Ahmad Badaruddin	13 April 2011	18 June 2013	2 years, 66 days	Royal Malaysian Navy	
4	Dato' Abu Bakar Md Said RMAF	Lieutenant General; Dato' Abu Bakar Md Said RMAF	19 September 2013	27 June 2014	281 days	Royal Malaysian Air Force	
5	Dato' Sri Affendi Buang RMAF	Lieutenant General; Dato' Sri Affendi Buang RMAF	1 July 2014	14 November 2014	136 days	Royal Malaysian Air Force	
6	Dato' Sri Ackbal Abdul Samad RMAF	Lieutenant General; Dato' Sri Ackbal Abdul Samad RMAF	17 November 2014	3 September 2015	290 days	Royal Malaysian Air Force	
7	Datuk Baharom Hamzah	Lieutenant General; Datuk Baharom Hamzah	4 September 2015	23 March 2016	201 days	Malaysian Army	
8	Dato' Shahrani Mohd Sany	Lieutenant General; Dato' Shahrani Mohd Sany	24 March 2016	29 September 2016	189 days	Malaysian Army	
9	Dato' Fadzil Mokhtar	Lieutenant General; Dato' Fadzil Mokhtar	30 September 2016	29 November 2017	1 year, 60 days	Malaysian Army	
10	Datuk Mohd Reza Mohd Sany	Vice Admiral; Datuk Mohd Reza Mohd Sany	30 November 2017	9 July 2018	221 days	Royal Malaysian Navy	
11	Dato' Syed Zahiruddin Putra Syed Osman	Vice Admiral; Dato' Syed Zahiruddin Putra Syed Osman	10 July 2018	8 January 2019	182 days	Royal Malaysian Navy	
12	Dato’ Suhaimi Mohd Zuki	Lieutenant General; Dato’ Suhaimi Mohd Zuki	9 January 2019	16 February 2020	1 year, 38 days	Malaysian Army	
13	Dato’ Yazid Arshad RMAF	Lieutenant General; Dato’ Yazid Arshad RMAF	17 February 2020	5 December 2022	2 years, 291 days	Royal Malaysian Air Force	
14	Dato’ Noor Mohamad Akmar Mohd Dom RMAF	Lieutenant General; Dato’ Noor Mohamad Akmar Mohd Dom RMAF	6 December 2022	22 September 2024	1 year, 291 days	Royal Malaysian Air Force	
15	Dato’ Pahlawan Zahani Zainal Abidin RMAF	Lieutenant General; Dato’ Pahlawan Zahani Zainal Abidin RMAF	23 September 2024	17 January 2026	1 year, 116 days	Royal Malaysian Air Force	
16	Dato’ Tengku Muhammad Fauzi Tengku Ibrahim	Lieutenant General; Dato’ Tengku Muhammad Fauzi Tengku Ibrahim	18 January 2026	Incumbent	264 days	Malaysian Army	

== See also ==
- Ministry of Defence Malaysia
- CANSOFCOM
- United States Special Operations Command (USSOCOM)
