= Borhan Ahmad =

12th Chief of the Malaysian Defence Forces (1994–1995)

Yang Berbahagia General (Rtd) Tan Sri Borhan Ahmad PGAT PMN PSM SPKK DCSM DPKK DPMJ DSAP PAT JMN JSM SMJ DSM SMP PSK KMN BSK ADK PKB KPK PPA PPM PNBB PJM
- برهان أحمد
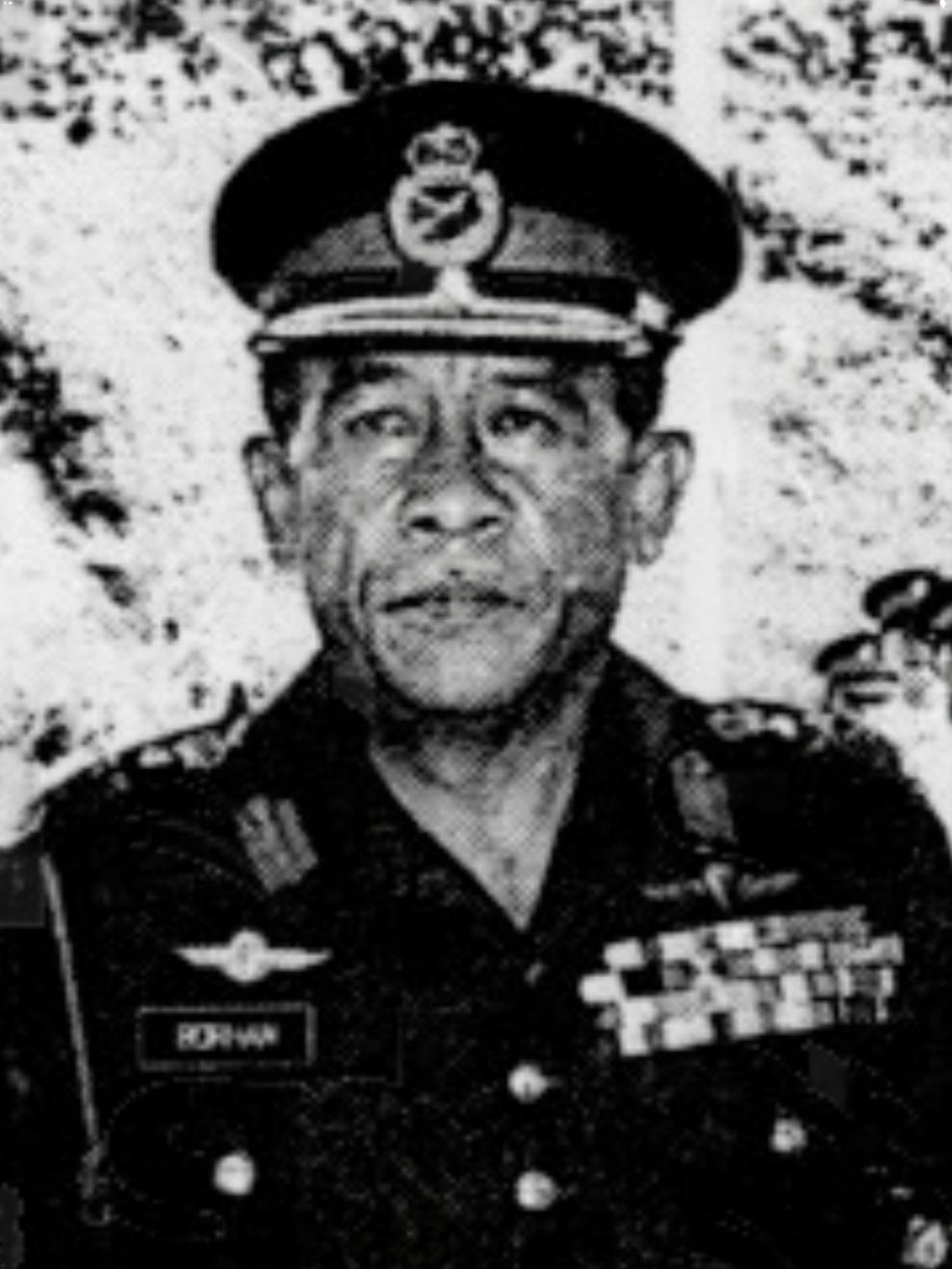
- Borhan in 1993

12th Chief of Defence Forces
- In office 1 February 1994 – 2 February 1995
- Monarchs: Azlan Shah (1994); Ja'afar (1994–1995)
- Prime Minister: Mahathir Mohamad
- Minister of Defence: Najib Razak
- Preceded by: Abdul Rahman Abdul Hamid
- Succeeded by: Ismail Omar

13th Chief of Army
- In office 4 March 1993 – 31 January 1994
- Preceded by: Abdul Rahman Abdul Hamid
- Succeeded by: Ismail Omar

Personal details
- Born: 12 December 1939 (age 86) Pasir Mas, Kelantan, Unfederated Malay States
- Spouse: Sazlina Abdullah
- Children: 4
- Education: Federation Military College, Port Dickson

Military service
- Allegiance: Malaysia
- Branch/service: Malaysian Army
- Years of service: 1959–1995
- Rank: General
- Unit: Royal Malay Regiment; 21st Special Service Group
- Battles/wars: Malayan Emergency; Indonesia–Malaysia confrontation; Second Malayan Emergency

Borhan Ahmad (Jawi: برهان بن حاج أحمد; born 12 December 1939), is a Malaysian retired military officer who served as the 12th chief of defence forces from February 1994 to February 1995. Prior to his appointment, he previously served as the 13th chief of Malaysian Army from March 1993 to January 1994.

Until to the date, he is the first and only one from the 'commando' officer who has ever served as both the chief of the Army and then as chief of defence forces.

== Early life and education ==
Borhan was born on 12 December 1939 in Pasir Mas, Kelantan. He was raised in Merlimau, Malacca before he moved back to Pasir Mas to get started his primary education at Ismail English School, Kota Bharu in early 1949. In 1953, he selected to undergo secondary education at Federation Military College, Port Dickson and he attended the Officer Cadet Course in 1958.

During his military career, Borhan attended various courses including Special Forces Officers Course at Fort Bragg in 1966, Small-scale Amphibious Operations Course in Australia in 1967 and he also attended at National Defence College, New Delhi in 1986.

== Career ==
=== Military career ===
Borhan was commissioned to Junior lieutenant on 13 December 1959 and posted as platoon commander in 4th Battalion, Royal Malay Regiment. In the late 1960, he served with his battalion under the Malayan Special Forces for United Nations Operation in the Congo (UNOC). When his assignment was completed in December 1962, he was selected to become officer-cadet instructor at Federation Military College until August 1965 before he joined the Malaysian Special Service unit, which newly formed while the Konfrontasi was ongoing.

In the late December 1970, Borhan promoted to lieutenant colonel and posted as commanding officer of Malaysian Special Service Regiment before he transferred as Defense attache in South Vietnam in January 1975. In January 1978, he promoted to colonel and posted as Commandant of Special Warfare Training Centre before he transferred as Chief of Staff of 4th Infantry Division three years later.

In January 1984, he promoted to brigadier general and took charge of the 21st Special Service Group until 6 October 1987 before he transferred to Commander 4th Infantry Division and get promoted to major general. On 16 June 1990, he appointed as Commander of Army Corps and get promoted to lieutenant general. The position he held until 1992 before transferred to Deputy Chief of Army.

On 3 March 1993, Borhan appointed as 13th chief of Army and get promoted to general and then he appointed as 12th chief of defence forces following retirement his predecessor Abdul Rahman Abdul Hamid on 1 February 1994. The position he held until his retirement on 2 February 1995 and succeeded by Ismail Omar.

=== Post-military career ===
After his retirement from military, he has appointed at several positions including Deputy President of Malaysian Amateur Boxing Association (MABA) in 1995, Chairman of Armed Forces Veterans Affairs Corporation (PERHEBAT) and Board Member of Ekovest Berhad in 2005.

== Personal life ==
Borhan married Sazlina binti Abdullah and blessed with one son and three daughters.

== Honours ==
=== Honours of Malaysia ===
- Malaysia
  - Commander of the Order of the Defender of the Realm (PMN) – Tan Sri (1994)
  - Commander of the Order of Loyalty to the Crown of Malaysia (PSM) – Tan Sri (1993)
  - Companion of the Order of the Defender of the Realm (JMN) (1990)
  - Companion of the Order of Loyalty to the Crown of Malaysia (JSM) (1981)
  - Officer of the Order of the Defender of the Realm (KMN) (1972)
  - Recipient of the Active Service Medal (PKB)
  - Recipient of the Mention in dispatches (KPK) (1974)
  - Recipient of the General Service Medal (PPA)
  - Recipient of the Malaysian Commemorative Medal (Bronze) (PPM (G))
  - Recipient of the United Nations Missions Service Medal (PNBB) with "CONGO" clasp (1994)
  - Recipient of the 8th Yang di-Pertuan Agong Installation Medal
- Malaysian Armed Forces
  - Courageous Commander of the Most Gallant Order of Military Service (PGAT)
  - Warrior of the Most Gallant Order of Military Service (PAT)
  - Recipient of the Malaysian Service Medal (PJM)
- Johor
  - Knight Commander of the Order of the Crown of Johor (DPMJ) – Dato' (1985)
  - Companion of the Order of the Crown of Johor (SMJ) (1980)
- Kelantan
  - Knight Grand Commander of the Order of the Noble Crown of Kelantan (SPKK) – Dato' (1991)
  - Knight Commander of the Order of the Noble Crown of Kelantan (DPKK) – Dato' (1988)
  - Commander of the Order of the Loyalty to the Crown of Kelantan (PSK)
  - Officer of the Order of the Loyalty to the Crown of Kelantan (BSK)
  - Recipient of Sultan Ismail Petra Coronation Medal
- Malacca
  - Knight Commander of the Exalted Order of Malacca (DCSM) – Datuk Wira (1994)
  - Member of the Exalted Order of Malacca (DSM)
- Pahang
  - Knight Companion of the Order of Sultan Ahmad Shah of Pahang (DSAP) – Dato' (1988)
  - Companion of the Order of the Crown of Pahang (SMP)
- Sabah
  - Member of the Order of Kinabalu (ADK)

=== Foreign honours ===
- United Nations
  - Recipient of the ONUC Medal
