= Mohammad Ab Rahman =

Malaysian general (born 1964)

Yang Berbahagia General Tan Sri Mohammad Ab Rahman PGAT PMN PSM PJN SPMS SPKK SSPK SSMZ SPTS DGSM PSAT DSPK SMW DPKK PAT KAT KMN PPS PPA PNBB PJM DUBC PM
- محمد اب رحمن
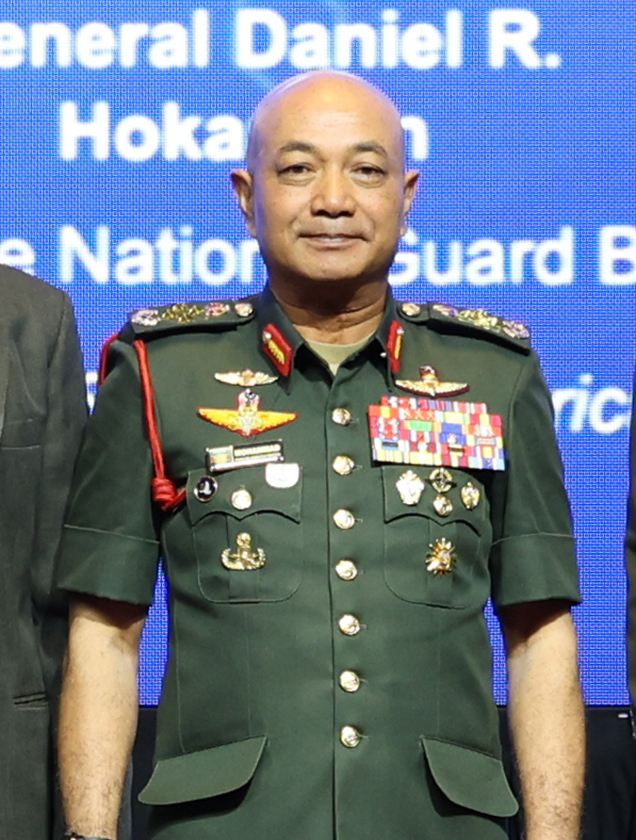
- Mohammad in 2024

22nd Chief of Defence Forces
- In office 6 September 2023 – 30 January 2025
- Monarchs: Abdullah; Ibrahim Iskandar
- Minister of Defence: Mohamad Hasan; Mohamed Khaled Nordin
- Preceded by: Affendi Buang
- Succeeded by: Mohd Nizam Jaffar

29th Chief of Army
- In office 22 March 2023 – 5 September 2023
- Monarch: Abdullah
- Minister: Mohamad Hasan
- Preceded by: Zamrose Mohd Zain
- Succeeded by: Muhammad Hafizuddeain Jantan

Personal details
- Born: Mohammad bin Ab Rahman; 15 March 1964 (age 62) Machang, Kelantan, Malaysia
- Spouse: Ramlah Dawi
- Education: Royal Military College, Kuala Lumpur; University of North Carolina at Charlotte (BCompSc)

Military service
- Allegiance: Malaysia
- Branch/service: Malaysian Army
- Years of service: 1987–2025
- Rank: General
- Unit: Royal Malay Regiment
- Battles/wars: Communist insurgency in Malaysia (1968–89)

Mohammad bin Ab Rahman (born 15 March 1964) is a Malaysian military officer who served as the 22nd Chief of Defence Forces from September 2023 to January 2025. Prior to his appointment, he previously served as the Chief of Army from March 2023 to September 2023.

== Early life and education ==
Mohammad Ab Rahman was born on 15 March 1964 in Machang, Kelantan. He received his early education at Sekolah Menengah Sains Kelantan before continuing his studies at the Royal Military College in Sungai Besi, Kuala Lumpur, in 1980. Subsequently, he pursued undergraduate studies in Computer Science at the University of North Carolina, Charlotte, United States.

== Military career ==
Mohammad was commissioned as a junior officer in the Royal Malay Regiment on 1 July 1987. Over the years, he underwent various courses both domestically and abroad. He completed the Grade 2 Staff and Tactics Course in Waiouru, New Zealand, and also attended the Army Command and Staff College in Fort Queenscliff, Australia.

Mohammad graduated from the Armed Forces Defense College in Kuala Lumpur. He holds a master's degree in defence studies from the University of Canberra, Australia, and another master's degree in social sciences (defence studies) from Universiti Kebangsaan Malaysia. His diverse military assignments included roles such as Commanding Officer of the 23rd Battalion of the Royal Malay Soldier Regiment (23 RAMD), Chief of the Second Malaysian Infantry Brigade (2 Brigades), Chief of the Third Malaysian Infantry Division (3 Divisions), Chief of Army Training and Chief of the Army's Western Field. He then advanced to the position of Deputy Chief of Army on 19 December 2020.

Mohammad later ascended to the role of Chief of Army, replacing retiring General Zamrose Mohd Zain on 22 March 2023. Few months later, he was promoted to the position of Chief of Defence Forces on the effective date of 6 September 2023. This appointment marked him as the 22nd Chief of Defence Forces. He succeeded General Affendi Buang, who retired from the position on the same day.

== Honours ==
=== Honours of Malaysia ===
- Malaysia
  - Commander of the Order of the Defender of the Realm (PMN) – Tan Sri (2024)
  - Commander of the Order of Loyalty to the Crown of Malaysia (PSM) – Tan Sri (2023)
  - Commander of the Order of Meritorious Service (PJN) – Datuk (2022)
  - Officer of the Order of the Defender of the Realm (KMN) (2010)
  - Recipient of the Loyal Service Medal (PPS)
  - Recipient of the General Service Medal (PPA)
  - Recipient of the United Nations Missions Service Medal (PNBB) with "CONGO" clasp
  - Recipient of the 11th Yang di-Pertuan Agong Installation Medal
  - Recipient of the 12th Yang di-Pertuan Agong Installation Medal
  - Recipient of the 13th Yang di-Pertuan Agong Installation Medal
  - Recipient of the 17th Yang di-Pertuan Agong Installation Medal
- Malaysian Armed Forces
  - Courageous Commander of the Most Gallant Order of Military Service (PGAT) (2023)
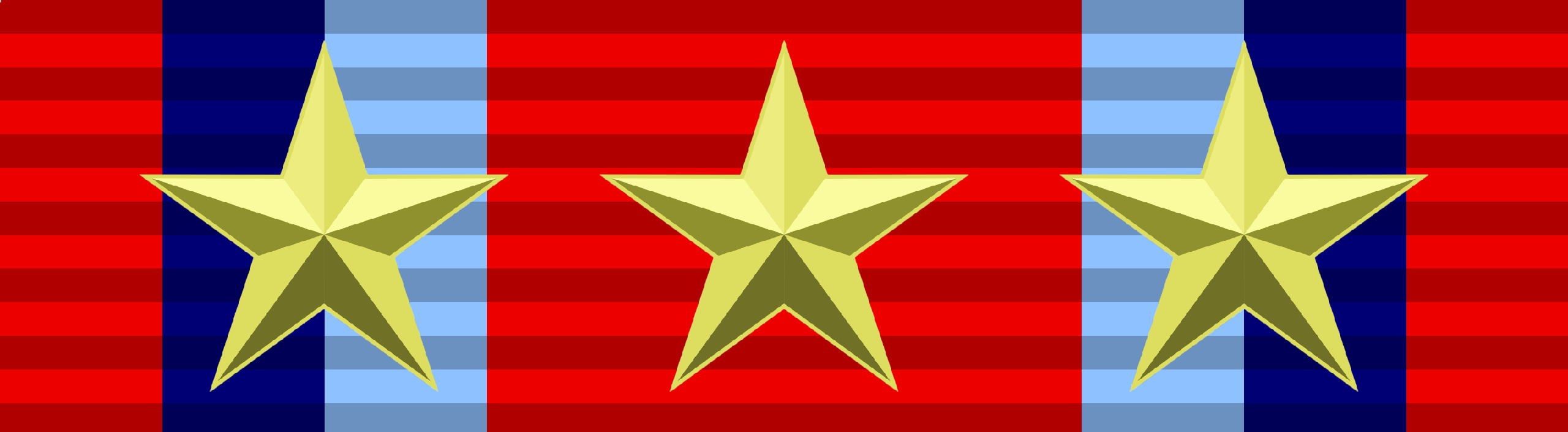
  - Loyal Commander of the Most Gallant Order of Military Service (PSAT)
  - Warrior of the Most Gallant Order of Military Service (PAT)
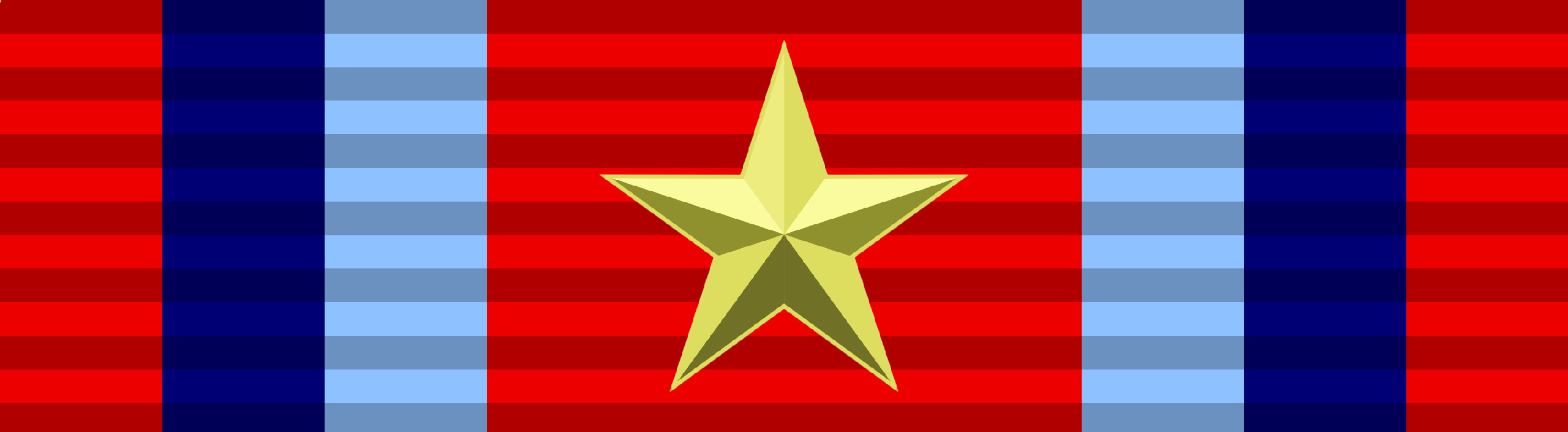
  - Officer of the Most Gallant Order of Military Service (KAT)
  - Recipient of the Malaysian Service Medal (PJM)
- Federal Territory (Malaysia)
  - Grand Commander of the Order of the Territorial Crown (SMW) – Datuk Seri (2022)
- Kedah
  - Knight Grand Commander of the Glorious Order of the Loyal Warrior of Kedah (SSPK) – Dato' Seri Pahlawan (2024)
  - Knight Commander of the Glorious Order of the Loyal Warrior of Kedah (DSPK) – Dato' Pahlawan (2021)
- Kelantan
  - Knight Grand Commander of the Order of the Noble Crown of Kelantan (SPKK) – Dato' (2023)
  - Knight Commander of the Order of the Noble Crown of Kelantan (DPKK) – Dato' (2015)
- Malacca
  - Grand Commander of the Exalted Order of Malacca (DGSM) – Datuk Seri (2024)
- Perak
  - Knight Grand Commander of the Order of Taming Sari (SPTS) – Dato' Seri Panglima (2023)
  - Recipient of the Sultan Nazrin Shah Installation Medal (6 May 2015)
- Selangor
  - Knight Grand Commander of the Order of the Crown of Selangor (SPMS) – Dato' Seri (2023)
- Terengganu
  - Knight Grand Companion of the Order of Sultan Mizan Zainal Abidin of Terengganu (SSMZ) – Dato' Seri (2024)

=== Foreign honours ===
- Singapore
  - Recipient of the Darjah Utama Bakti Cemerlang (Tentera) (DUBC) (2025)
- Thailand
  - Knight Grand Cross of the Order of the Crown of Thailand (PM) (2025)
- United Nations
  - Recipient of the MONUC Medal with "2" award numeral
