= Order of the Noble Crown of Kelantan =

Honorific order of the Sultanate of Kelantan

Order of the Noble Crown of Kelantan Darjah Kebesaran Kesateria Mahkota Kelantan

Awarded by Sultan of Kelantan
- Type: Order
- Established: 30 March 1988
- Royal house: House of Long Yunus
- Ribbon: Dark red; White
- Motto: Di Keberanian dan Kesetiaan (Note: Jawi: دي كبرانين دان كستياءن) (In Valor and Fidelity)
- Status: Currently constituted
- Founder: Ismail Petra of Kelantan
- Sovereign: Muhammad V of Kelantan
- Grades: Knight Grand Commander; Knight Commander; Commander
- Post-nominals: S.P.K.K.; D.P.K.K.; P.K.K.

Precedence
- Next (higher): Order of the Life of the Crown of Kelantan
- Next (lower): Order of Loyalty to the Crown of Kelantan
- Ribbon bar of Knight Grand Commander Ribbon bar of lower classes

The Most Valiant Order of the Noble Crown of Kelantan or the Star of Yahya (Malay: Darjah Kebesaran Mahkota Kelantan Yang Amat Perkasa or Bintang Al-Yahyawi) is an honorific order of the Sultanate of Kelantan.

== History ==
The orders were established and first conferred on 30 March 1988 as recognition a distinguished service in military for the nation and the state of Kelantan.

== Order ranks ==
The order has three ranks:

=== Knight Grand Commander ===
Knight Grand Commander of the Order of the Noble Crown of Kelantan (S.P.K.K.) (Malay: Darjah Seri Paduka Kesateria Mahkota Kelantan (Al-Yahyawi I))

This rank is limited to 40 living recipients at any time, except foreign citizens who are conferred honorary awards. The recipient of this award receives the title Dato' and his wife Datin.

This rank comprises collar, sash, breast star and badge.

=== Knight Commander ===
Knight Commander of the Order of the Noble Crown of Kelantan (D.P.K.K.) (Malay: Darjah Dato' Paduka Kesateria Mahkota Kelantan (Al-Yahyawi II))

This rank is limited to 60 living recipients at any time, except foreign citizens who are conferred honorary awards. The recipient of this award receives the title Dato' and his wife Datin.

This rank comprises sash, breast star and badge.

=== Commander ===
Commander of the Order of the Noble Crown of Kelantan (P.K.K.) (Malay: Paduka Kesateria Mahkota Kelantan (Al-Yahyawi III))

There is no limit to the number of persons to be awarded this honour and can also be conferred on foreign citizens as an honorary award. It does not carry any title.

This rank comprises neck ribbon and badge.

== Recipients ==
=== Knights Grand Commander (SPKK) ===
- 1988: Yaacob Mohd Zain
- 1988: Mohamad Daud Abu Bakar
- 1989: Nik Mahmood Fakharuddin
- 1989: Jaffar Mohamad
- 1991: Abdul Wahab Nawi
- 1991: Borhan Ahmad
- 1991: Othman Haron
- 1996: Ismail Hassan
- 1997: Nawi Alias
- 1997: Panthep Phuvanartnuruk (Honorary)
- 1998: Maulud Maamin
- 1999: Mohd Zahidi Zainuddin
- 1999: Md Hashim Hussein
- 2000: Abdul Aziz Hassan
- 2000: Narong Denudon (Honorary)
- 2003: Khairuddin Mat Yusof
- 2003: Wan Abu Bakar Omar
- 2004: Abdullah Ahmad
- 2004: Mohd Azumi Mohamed
- 2004: Adenan Mohamad Zain
- 2004: Nik Ismail Nik Mohamed
- 2005: Abdul Aziz Zainal
- 2007: Zulkifeli Mohd Zin
- 2007: Bashir Abu Bakar
- 2008: Ramlan Mohamed Ali
- 2008: Mohd Salleh Ismail
- 2008: Mohd Amdan Kurish
- 2009: Abdul Aziz Jaafar
- 2009: Raja Mohamed Affandi
- 2012: Zulkifli Zainal Abidin
- 2013: Rodzali Daud
- 2015: Mamat Ariffin Abdullah
- 2017: Azizan Md Delin
- 2018: Affendi Buang
- 2023: Mohammad Ab Rahman
- 2024: Zulkeffeli Mat Jusoh
- 2025: Mohd Nizam Jaffar
- 2026: Malek Razak Sulaiman
- 2026: Azhan Md Othman

=== Knights Commander (DPKK) ===
- 1988: Borhan Ahmad
- 1988: Mustapha Awang
- 1988: Othman Haron
- 1988: Mohamad Hashim Alias
- 1989: Raja Abdul Rashid Badiozaman
- 1989: Ramli Ismail
- 1989: Tuan Hashim Tuan Mohamad
- 1989: Ibrahim Abdullah
- 1990: Mohd Fauzi Hussain
- 1990: Huang Chew Siong
- 1990: Abdul Aziz Abdullah
- 1991: Haron Mohd Salleh
- 1991: Ismail Hassan
- 1991: Ghazali Ibrahim
- 1991: Johan Hew Abdullah
- 1991: Nawi Alias
- 1992: Mohammad Hassan Ibrahim
- 1996: Abdul Aziz Hassan
- 1997: Husainay Hashim
- 1997: Mohd Amin Md Salleh
- 1997: Mohd Zaki Wan Mahmood
- 1997: Muhammad Yunus
- 1998: Nik Mohamed Zaaba Nik Daud
- 1998: Abdul Wahid Anwar
- 1999: Nik Ismail Nik Mohamed
- 2000: Hashim Yahya
- 2001: Mamat Ariffin Abdullah
- 2003: Bashir Abu Bakar
- 2003: Mohd Salleh Ismail
- 2003: Mokhtar Perman
- 2004: Mohamad Termidzi Junaidi
- 2004: Md Hanif Darimi
- 2004: Zulkifeli Mohd Zin
- 2005: Mohd Haniff Othman
- 2006: Mat Yassin Mat Daud
- 2006: Rohisha Yahaya
- 2007: Che Hasni Che Ahmad
- 2007: Dahari Hussin
- 2007: Mohd Said Sungib
- 2007: Saharudin Abu Bakar
- 2007: Sukri Husin
- 2008: Abdul Aziz Ibrahim
- 2008: Abdul Hadi Hussin
- 2008: Che Yahya Idris
- 2008: Khamsan Ngari
- 2009: Musa Omar
- 2009: Azizan Md Delin
- 2009: Mat Rashid Ashaari
- 2009: Zulkifli Mansor
- 2010: Abdul Halim Jalal
- 2010: Razali Mohd Regen
- 2010: Zahari Din
- 2011: Mohamad Khir Abdullah
- 2011: Mohamad Zaki Hamzah
- 2012: Zulkiple Kassim
- 2012: Mohd Rais Ali
- 2012: Norhuda Ahmad
- 2012: Tengku Ahmad Noor Tuan Chik
- 2012: Wan Normazlan Che Jaafar
- 2012: Yusri Anwar
- 2013: Nordin Salleh
- 2013: Suhaimi Che Mat
- 2013: Wan Othman Wan Abdul Rahman
- 2014: Mohd Shukuri Ahmad
- 2014: Ab Aziz Abdullah
- 2014: Ahmad Tajuddin Abdul Ghani
- 2014: Tuan Roslan Tuan Ismail
- 2015: Azmy Yahya
- 2015: Md Tajri Alwi
- 2015: Mohammad Ab Rahman
- 2015: Azlan Othman
- 2015: Zulkeffeli Mat Jusoh
- 2016: Ahmad Ab Rahman
- 2016: Wan Nawawi Daud
- 2017: Mohd Ramli Jaafar
- 2017: Kamarulzaman Jusoh
- 2017: Mohd Zulkipli Mohd Zahir
- 2017: Muhammad Tarminzi Mustapa
- 2017: Nazari Abd Hadi
- 2017: Sharum Shaim
- 2017: Wee Han Siew
- 2019: Ackbal Abdul Samad
- 2019: Ibrahim Yasir
- 2019: Muhammad Huzaimi Sabri
- 2019: Zulkefale A Rahman
- 2022: Ahmad Abu Bakar
- 2022: Mohd Hatim Saad
- 2022: Mohd Razali Alias
- 2022: Rashidin Hashimi Ab Rashid
- 2022: Abu Hasan Assha’ari Kamis @ Shaffiee
- 2022: Azhar Tahir
- 2022: Zulmajdi Yunus
- 2023: Mohd Asghar Khan Goriman Khan
- 2023: Muhammad Hafizuddeain Jantan
- 2023: Azhan Md Othman
- 2023: Sarman Bahrom
- 2023: Azudin Hassan
- 2024: Saharudin Harun
- 2024: Muzamil Ali
- 2024: Norazman Ismail
- 2024: Suhaimi Shamsuddin
- 2025: Muhamad Norazlan Aris
- 2025: Mahadzer Amin
- 2025: Azhar Mustapha
- 2025: Mohd Tawil Daud
- 2025: Mohamed Zaki Mohamed Mokhtar
- 2026: Faridhulathroth Hashim
- 2026: Mohamad Nizam Abdul Manap
- 2026: Mohd Shauari Mat Piah
- 2026: Zamsari Abu Hasan
- 2026: Muhammad Fauzi Abu Bakar
- 2026: Zamri Mat Esa

=== Commanders (PKK) ===
- 1988: Abdul Aziz Abdullah
- 1989: Mohamed Hassan Ibrahim
- 1990: Mohamed Zaki Wan Mahmood
- 1990: Abdul Halim Zakaria
- 1990: Salleh Hussein
- 1990: Saidi Zakaria
- 1990: Nik Mohamed Zaaba Nik Daud
- 1990: Mohamed Zawawi Adam
- 1990: Shamsuddin Basarah
- 1991: Abdullah Omar
- 1991: Jusoh Daud
- 1991: Nik Anis Nik Abdullah
- 1991: Mohamad Aris Salim
- 2006: Abdul Hadi Husin
- 2006: Che Hashim Ishak
- 2006: Jeyabalan C. Sinnadurai
- 2006: Kamaruldin Mohd
- 2006: Khamsan Ngari
- 2006: Mohd Ramli Jaafar
- 2006: Razali Mohd Regen
- 2006: Razif Idris
- 2006: Shaharudin Abu Bakar
- 2006: Sukri Hussin
- 2006: Zulkifli Mansor
- 2007: Ghazali Ismail
- 2007: Md Tajri Alwi
- 2007: Mohamad Khir Abdullah
- 2007: Mohd Rais Ali
- 2007: Ramlan Kasbi
- 2007: Roslan Idris
- 2007: Sofian Kamarudin
- 2010: Kamaruzaman Jusoh
- 2010: Muhammad Daniel @ Damien Abdullah
- 2010: Othman Jamal
- 2010: Abdul Wahab Abdul Manaf
- 2011: Azlan Othman
- 2011: Ku Mohd Ali Ku Sulong
- 2014: Wee Han Siew
- 2014: Hamdan Ismail
- 2014: Mad Mustakim Ahamat Saluti
- 2014: Yusoff Omar
- Unknown: Khlir Mohd Nor

== See also ==
- Orders, decorations, and medals of the Malaysian states and federal territories#Kelantan
- Orders, decorations, and medals of Kelantan
- List of post-nominal letters (Kelantan)
