= Glorious Order of the Crown of Kedah =

Glorious Order of the Crown of Kedah Darjah Kebesaran Gemilang Sri Mahkota Kedah

Awarded by Sultan of Kedah
- Type: Order
- Status: Currently constituted
- Sovereign: Sallehuddin of Kedah
- Grades: Commander (DGMK); Companion (GMK); Member (AGK)

Precedence
- Next (higher): Order of Loyalty to Sultan Sallehuddin of Kedah; Order of Loyalty to Sultan Abdul Halim Mu'adzam Shah (dormant)
- Next (lower): Exalted Order of the Crown of Kedah
- Ribbon bar of the order

The Glorious Order of the Crown of Kedah (Bahasa Melayu: Darjah Kebesaran Gemilang Sri Mahkota Kedah) is an honorific order of the Sultanate of Kedah

== History ==
It was founded by Sultan Abdul Halim of Kedah in January 2001.

== Classes ==
It is awarded in three classes:

- Commander or Dato' Wira (DGMK) with title Dato' Wira
- Companion or Setia (GMK)
- Member or Ahli (AGK)

Ribbon
DGMK	GMK	AGK
