= General Service Medal (Malaysia) =

Service medal of Malaysia

- Type: Service medal
- Awarded for: Service in Malaysia
- Presented by: Malaysia
- Eligibility: Malaysian Armed Forces and uniformed civil personnel
- Post-nominals: P.P.A.
- Status: Currently issued
- Established: 29 July 1960
- Ribbon of the medal

Precedence
- Next (higher): Kepujian Perutusan Keberanian K.P.K.
- Next (lower): Pingat Peringatan Malaysia P.P.M.

The General Service Medal (Malay: Pingat Perkhidmatan Am) is a service medal of Malaysia. It is awarded for general service to members of the military and uniformed services of Malaysia. It ranks 26th in the order of wear of the Orders, decorations, and medals of Malaysia.

== Criteria ==
The General Service Medal is awarded to members of the Malaysian Armed Forces and Uniformed Services in acknowledgement and recognition of long service and good conduct.

== Appearance ==
The General Service Medal is round 1 3/8 in (35 mm) in diameter and made of silver. The obverse of the medal bears the Coat of arms of Malaysia. The reverse is inscribed with the words KERANA PERKHIDMATAN AM (For General Service) within a wreath of laurel leaves. The medal hangs from a red ribbon with a centre yellow stripe. On each side of the yellow stripe are black and white stripes.
