= Mohd Asghar Khan Goriman Khan =

20th Chief of Air Force (Malaysia)

Yang Berbahagia General Tan Sri Dato' Sri Mohd Asghar Khan Goriman Khan PGAT PSM SSAP PSAT PJN DPKK DSAP DIMP PAT SAP SMP KAT KMW AMP PPS PPA PJM AM
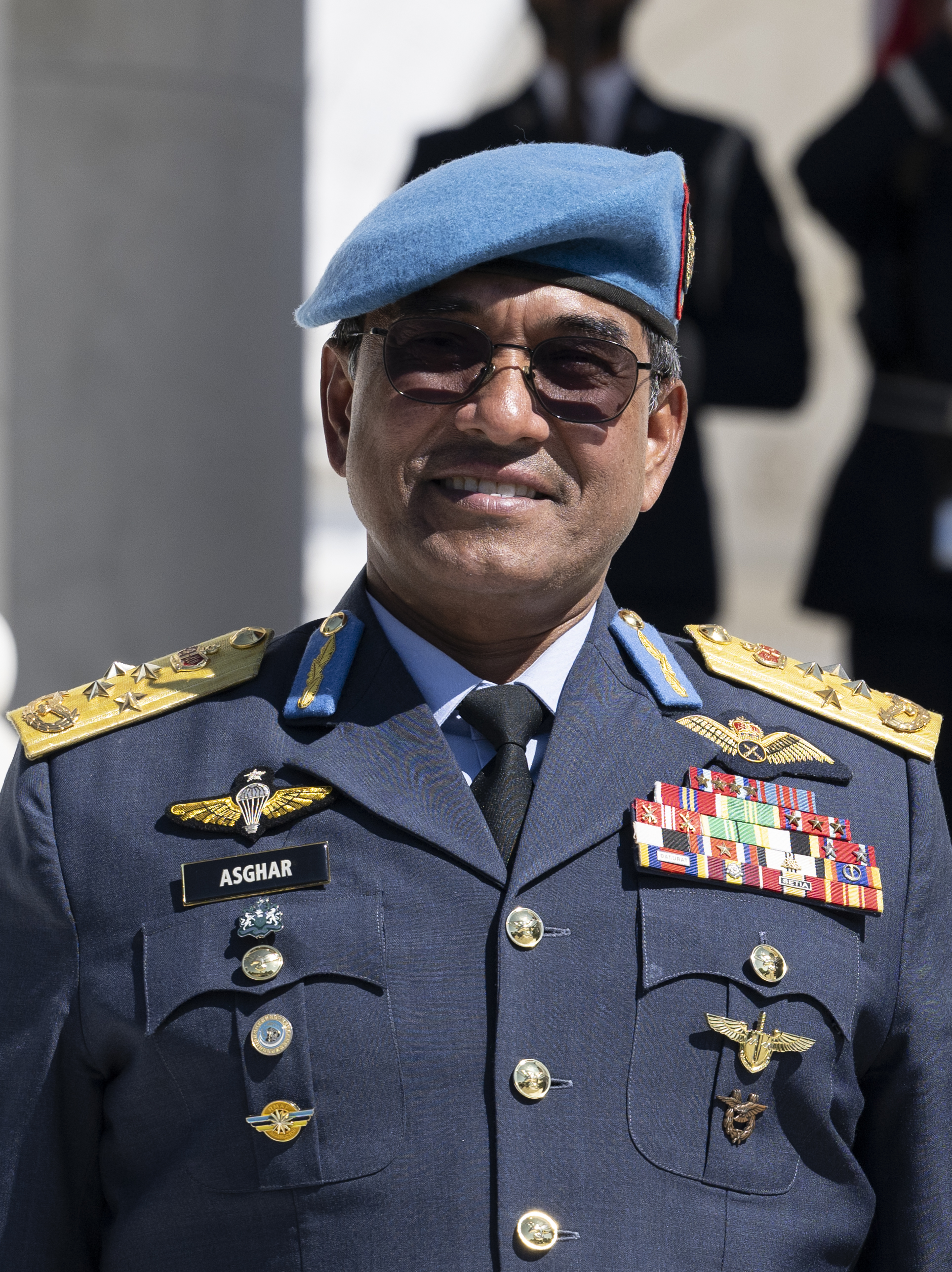
- General Asghar in 2024

20th Chief of Air Force
- In office 7 March 2022 – 25 June 2025
- Monarchs: Abdullah; Ibrahim Iskandar
- Minister: Hishammuddin Hussein (2021–2022); Mohamad Hasan (2022–2023); Mohamed Khaled Nordin (2023–present)
- Deputy: Mohammad Salleh Osman (2022); Muhamad Norazlan Aris (2022–2025)
- Preceded by: Ackbal Abdul Samad
- Succeeded by: Muhamad Norazlan Aris

Personal details
- Born: 26 December 1965 (age 60) Selangor, Malaysia
- Spouse: Bibi Nasratjahan Gulab Khan
- Education: Royal Military College
- Alma mater: University of Malaya (Dipl.); Quaid-i-Azam University (MSc)
- Nickname: "Gunjiz"

Military service
- Allegiance: Malaysia
- Branch/service: Royal Malaysian Air Force
- Years of service: 1983−2025
- Rank: General
- Battles/wars: Communist insurgency in Malaysia (1968–89)

Mohd Asghar Khan bin Goriman Khan (born 26 December 1965 in Selangor) is a Malaysian military officer who served as the 20th Chief of Royal Malaysian Air Force from March 2022 to June 2025. Prior to his appointment, he previously served as Deputy Chief of Royal Malaysian Air Force from January 2020 to March 2022.

== Personal life ==
Asghar is born on 26 December 1965 in the state of Selangor, Malaysia with Pakistani ancestral roots in the village of Beer in Tanawal region (present-day Haripur, Khyber Pakhtunkhwa province, Pakistan). He is married to Bibi Nasratjahan Gulab Khan and they have three children.

== Honours ==
=== National Honours ===
- Malaysia
  - Commander of the Order of Loyalty to the Crown of Malaysia (PSM) – Tan Sri (2022)
  - Commander of the Order of Meritorious Service (PJN) – Datuk (2020)
  - Recipient of the Loyal Service Medal (PPS)
  - Recipient of the General Service Medal (PPA)
  - Recipient of the 17th Yang di-Pertuan Agong Installation Medal
- Malaysian Armed Forces
  - Courageous Commander of the Most Gallant Order of Military Service (PGAT) (2022)
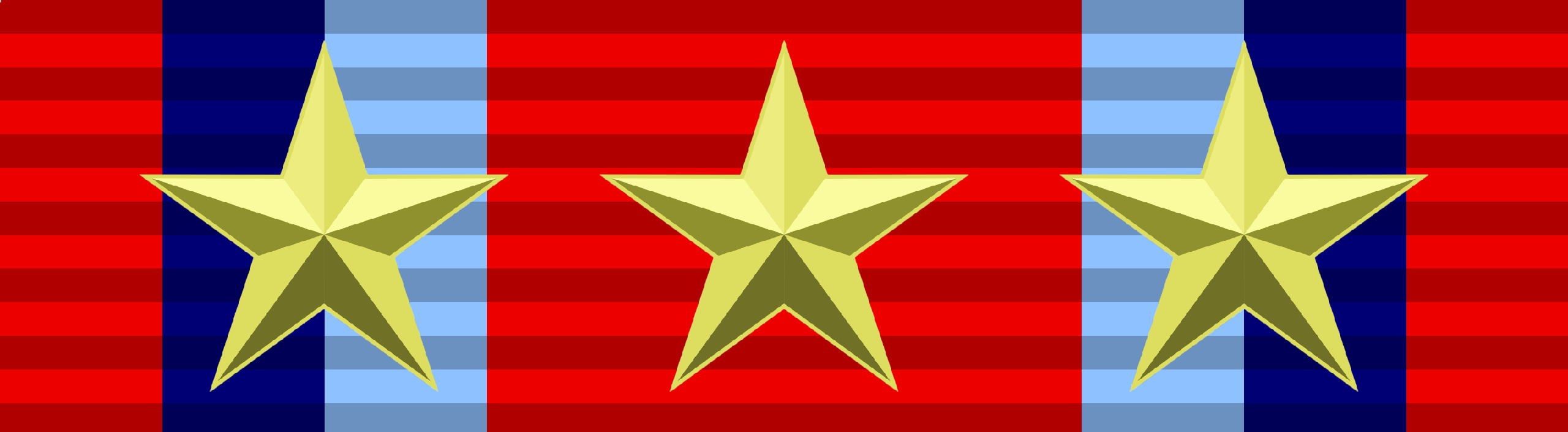
  - Loyal Commander of the Most Gallant Order of Military Service (PSAT)
  - Warrior of the Most Gallant Order of Military Service (PAT)
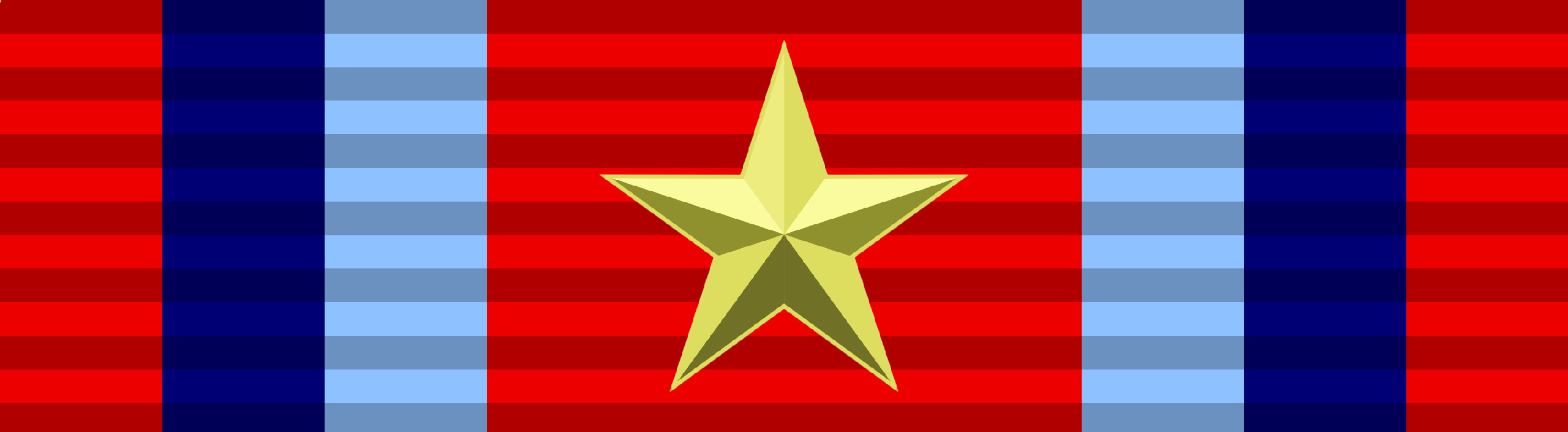
  - Officer of the Most Gallant Order of Military Service (KAT)
  - Recipient of the Malaysian Service Medal (PJM)
- Federal Territory (Malaysia)
  - Officer of the Order of the Territorial Crown (KMW) (2010)
- Kelantan
  - Knight Commander of the Order of the Noble Crown of Kelantan (DPKK) – Dato' (2023)
- Pahang
  - Knight Grand Companion of the Order of Sultan Ahmad Shah of Pahang (SSAP) – Dato' Sri (2021)
  - Knight Companion of the Order of Sultan Ahmad Shah of Pahang (DSAP) – Dato' (2017)
  - Knight Companion of the Order of the Crown of Pahang (DIMP) – Dato' (2014)
  - Companion of the Order of Sultan Ahmad Shah of Pahang (SAP) (2012)
  - Companion of the Order of the Crown of Pahang (SMP) (2005)
  - Member of the Order of the Crown of Pahang (AMP)

=== Foreign Honours ===
- Australia
  - Honorary Member of the Order of Australia (AM) (2025)
- France
  - Commander of the National Order of Merit (2025)
- Indonesia
  - Air Force Meritorious Service Star, 1st Class (2024)
