= Rodzali Daud =

Chief of Air Force (Malaysia)

Yang Berbahagia General (Rtd) Tan Sri Rodzali Daud PGAT PSM PJN SPKK SSAP SIMP DGPN SPMT SPTS DHMS PSAT DIMP PAT SMT KMN AMP PPS PPA PJM PKN PM
- روذالي داود
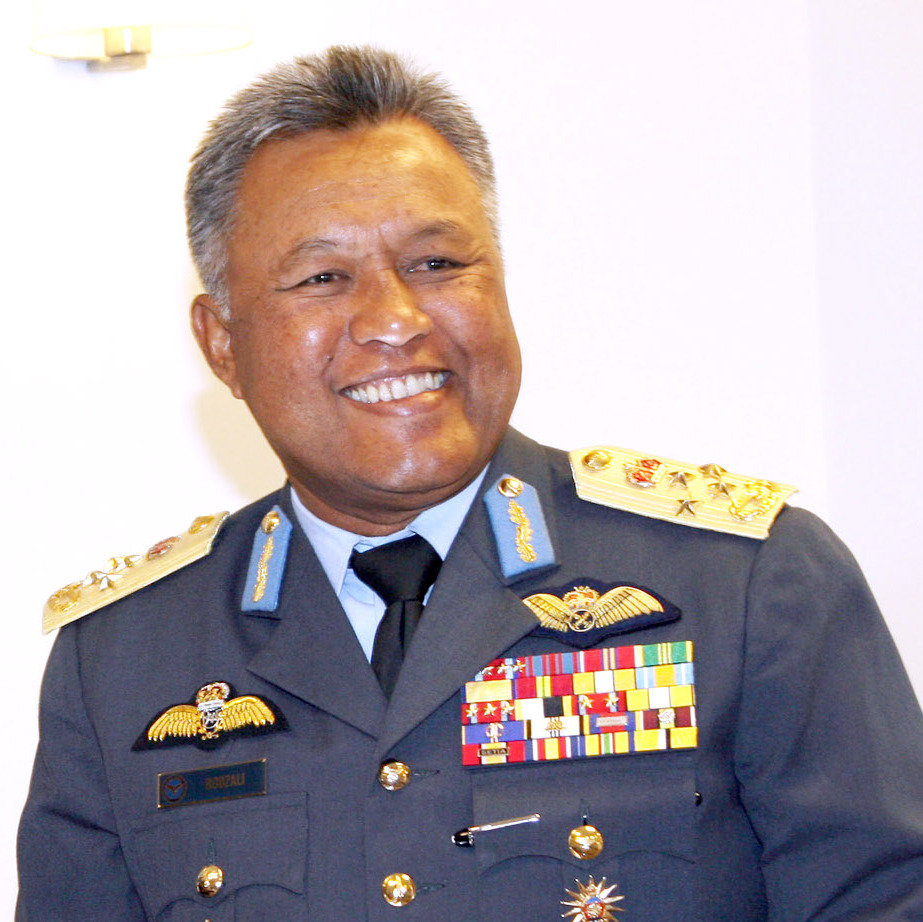
- Rodzali in 2013

16th Chief of Air Force
- In office 1 September 2009 – 11 September 2014
- Monarchs: Mizan Zainal Abidin (2009–2011); Abdul Halim (2011–2014)
- Prime Minister: Najib Razak
- Minister of Defence: Hishammuddin Hussein
- Preceded by: Azizan Ariffin
- Succeeded by: Roslan Saad

Personal details
- Born: 11 March 1955 (age 71) Besut, Terengganu, Federation of Malaya
- Spouse: Asnah Din
- Children: 2

Military service
- Allegiance: Malaysia
- Branch/service: Royal Malaysian Air Force
- Years of service: 1973–2015
- Rank: General
- Battles/wars: Second Malayan Emergency

Rodzali bin Daud (Jawi: روذالي بن داود; born 11 March 1955), is a Malaysian retired-military officer who served as the 16th Chief of Air Force from September 2009 to September 2014.

== Early life and education ==
Rodzali was born on 11 March 1955 in Besut, Terengganu. He began his earlier education at Tengku Mahmud School in Besut, then he continued his secondary education at Royal Military College, Sungai Besi before he joined to military.

After joined to military, Rodzali attended various courses, including basic and advanced flying school at RAAF Flying Training School in 1974, course at New Zealand Defence College in 1989, course at Malaysian Armed Forces Staff College in 2002 with a master degree in defence studies from National University of Malaysia and course at Pakistan National Defence College in 2006 with master degree in strategic studies from Quaid-i-Azam University.

== Military career ==
Rodzali was commissioned to flying officer on 31 October 1973 after he completed his cadet officer training and he posted as flying officer at 6th Squadron, RMAF Labuan Air Base after he completed his flying school. From 1988, he has served in various positions, including commanding officer of 12th Squadron then same position at 17 Squadron, Commander of RMAF Kuantan Air Base, Assistant Chief of Staff of Planning and Development, Commander of Air Educations and Training Command, Commander of 1st Air Division and Commander of Air Operations Command.

On 1 September 2009, Rodzali was appointed as 16th Chief of Royal Malaysian Air Force who succeeding Azizan Ariffin who appointed as 17th Chief of Defence Forces. That position he held until his retirement on 11 September 2014 and succeeded by Roslan Saad.

== Personal life ==
Rodzali married with Asnah binti Din and blessed with two sons. He likes reading, travelling and playing golf in spare time.

== Honours ==
=== Honours of Malaysia ===
- Malaysia
  - Commander of the Order of Loyalty to the Crown of Malaysia (PSM) – Tan Sri (2010)
  - Commander of the Order of Meritorious Service (PJN) – Datuk
  - Officer of the Order of the Defender of the Realm (KMN) (1994)
  - Recipient of the Loyal Service Medal (PPS)
  - Recipient of the General Service Medal (PPA)
  - Recipient of the National Sovereignty Medal (PKN) (2014)
  - Recipient of the 11th Yang di-Pertuan Agong Installation Medal
  - Recipient of the 12th Yang di-Pertuan Agong Installation Medal
  - Recipient of the 14th Yang di-Pertuan Agong Installation Medal
- Malaysian Armed Forces
  - Courageous Commander of the Most Gallant Order of Military Service (PGAT)
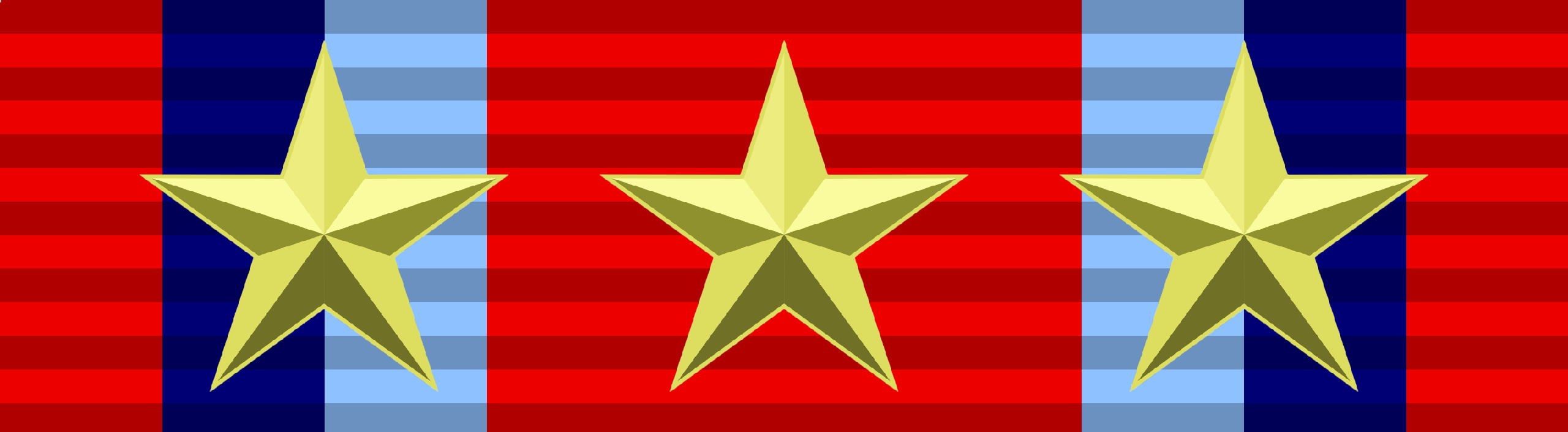
  - Loyal Commander of the Most Gallant Order of Military Service (PSAT)
  - Warrior of the Most Gallant Order of Military Service (PAT) (1999)
  - Recipient of the Malaysian Service Medal (PJM)
- Kedah
  - Knight Commander of the Order of Loyalty to Sultan Abdul Halim Mu'adzam Shah (DHMS) – Dato' Paduka (2013)
- Kelantan
  - Knight Grand Commander of the Order of the Noble Crown of Kelantan (SPKK) – Dato' (2013)
- Pahang
  - Knight Grand Companion of the Order of Sultan Ahmad Shah of Pahang (SSAP) – Dato' Sri (2009)
  - Knight Grand Companion of the Order of the Crown of Pahang (SIMP) – Dato' Indera (2006)
  - Knight Companion of the Order of the Crown of Pahang (DIMP) – Dato' (2003)
  - Member of the Order of the Crown of Pahang (AMP)
  - Recipient of the Sultan Ahmad Shah Silver Jubilee Medal
- Penang
  - Commander of the Order of the Defender of State (DGPN) – Dato' Seri (2011)
- Perak
  - Knight Grand Commander of the Order of Taming Sari (SPTS) – Dato' Seri Panglima (2011)
- Terengganu
  - Knight Grand Commander of the Order of the Crown of Terengganu (SPMT) – Dato' (2012)
  - Companion of the Order of the Crown of Terengganu (SMT) (2002)

=== Foreign honours ===
- Indonesia
  - First Class (Utama) of the Star of Swa Bhuwana Paksa (2013)
- Thailand
  - Knight Grand Cross of the Order of the Crown of Thailand (PM) (2013)
- United States
  - Commander of the Legion of Merit (2012)
