= Mohd Yunus Mohd Tasi =

9th Chief of Royal Malaysian Air Force (1990–1993)

Yang Berbahagia Lieutenant General (Rtd) Tan Sri Mohd Yunus Mohd Tasi PGAT PSM SIMP SPTS DPTS JMN ASDK KMN PKB PPA PPM PJM
- محمد يونس محمد طاسي

9th Chief of Air Force
- In office 19 March 1990 – 18 March 1993
- Monarch: Azlan Shah
- Prime Minister: Mahathir Mohamad
- Minister of Defence: Tengku Ahmad Rithauddeen Ismail (1990); Najib Razak (1990–1993)
- Preceded by: Mohamed Ngah Said
- Succeeded by: Abdul Ghani Abdul Aziz

Personal details
- Born: 3 September 1940 (age 86) Kota Bharu, Perak, Federated Malay States
- Spouse: Tengku Elena Tengku Kamarulzaman (m. 1963; died 2025)
- Children: 3
- Education: Federation Military College, Port Dickson

Military service
- Allegiance: Malaysia
- Branch/service: Royal Malaysian Air Force
- Years of service: 1960–1993
- Rank: Lieutenant General
- Battles/wars: Indonesia–Malaysia confrontation; Second Malayan Emergency

Mohd Yunus bin Mohd Tasi (Jawi: محمد يونس بن محمد طاسي; born 3 September 1940), is a Malaysian retired military officer who served as the 9th Chief of Air Force from March 1990 to March 1993.

== Early life and education ==
Yunus was born on 3 September 1940 in Kota Bharu, Kampar District, Perak. He received his secondary education at Sekolah Menengah Kebangsaan Anderson, Ipoh and graduated in 1959 before undergoing the officer cadet course at Federation Military College, Port Dickson on 3 January 1960.

After joining to military, Yunus attended various courses, including course at National Defence College in New Delhi in 1985.

== Career ==
=== Military career ===
Yunus was commissioned to junior lieutenant in February 1961 and he was assigned to attend the initial flying instruction course at RAF South Cerney and the flying training school at RAF Tern Hill before getting his "wings" on 13 January 1962. After completing those courses, he was assigned as pilot officer at 1st Squadron, RMAF Kuching Air Base and in 1966, he was assigned to DHC-4 Caribou aircraft conversion course in Canada for three months.

In March 1970, Yunus took charge as commanding officer of RMAF Butterworth Air Base and then he was transferred as commanding officer of RMAF Kuala Lumpur Air Base on 11 June 1974 before getting rank promotion to brigadier general on 1 August 1979 and was transferred to air force staff at Ministry of Defence. On 16 July 1980, he took charge as Commander of RMAF Air Region 2. In 1981 until 1989, he held several positions, including assistant chief of staff of operations, commander of Air Operations Command and commander of Air Support Command. On 2 June 1989, he was appointed as Deputy Chief of Air Force.

On 19 March 1990, Yunus was appointed as 9th Chief of Royal Malaysian Air Force following retirement of his predecessor Mohamed Ngah Said. The position he held until his retirement on 18 March 1993 and was succeeded by Abdul Ghani Abdul Aziz.

== Personal life ==
Yunus married Tengku Elena binti Tengku Kamarulzaman in March 1963 and they were blessed with two daughters and one son. Tengku Elena died on 2 July 2025.

== Honours ==
- Malaysia
  - Commander of the Order of Loyalty to the Crown of Malaysia (PSM) – Tan Sri (2010)
  - Companion of the Order of the Defender of the Realm (JMN) (1984)
  - Officer of the Order of the Defender of the Realm (KMN) (1972)
  - Recipient of the Active Service Medal (PKB)
  - Recipient of the General Service Medal (PPA)
  - Recipient of the Malaysian Commemorative Medal (Bronze) (PPM (G))
- Malaysian Armed Forces
  - Courageous Commander of the Most Gallant Order of Military Service (PGAT) (1990)
  - Recipient of the Malaysian Service Medal (PJM)
- Pahang
  - Knight Grand Companion of the Order of the Crown of Pahang (SIMP) – formerly Dato', now Dato' Indera (1990)
- Perak
  - Knight Grand Commander of the Order of Taming Sari (SPTS) – Dato' Seri Panglima (1990)
  - Knight Commander of the Order of Taming Sari (DPTS) – Dato' Pahlawan (1986)
- Sabah
  - Companion of the Order of Kinabalu (ASDK)
