= Abdul Ghani Abdul Aziz =

10th Chief of Royal Malaysian Air Force (1993–1996)

Yang Berbahagia Lieutenant General (Rtd) Tan Sri Abdul Ghani Abdul Aziz PGAT PSM SIMP SPTS PSAT DIMP DPMK JMN KMN BK PTU PPA PPM PJM
- عبدالغني عبدالعزيز

10th Chief of Air Force
- In office 19 March 1993 – 8 August 1996
- Monarchs: Azlan Shah (1993–1994); Ja'afar (1994–1996)
- Prime Minister: Mahathir Mohamad
- Minister of Defence: Najib Razak (1993–1995); Syed Hamid Albar (1995–1996)
- Preceded by: Mohd Yunus Mohd Tasi
- Succeeded by: Ahmad Saruji Che Rose

Personal details
- Born: 7 November 1944 (age 81) Alor Setar, Syburi, Si Rat Malai (now Kedah, Malaysia)
- Spouse: Seri Wilson Syed Ibrahim
- Children: 3
- Parents: Abdul Aziz Zain (father); Fatimah Zahirin (mother)
- Education: Federation Military College, Sungai Besi; Lancaster University

Military service
- Allegiance: Malaysia
- Branch/service: Royal Malaysian Air Force
- Years of service: 1964–1996
- Rank: Lieutenant General
- Battles/wars: Indonesia–Malaysia confrontation; Second Malayan Emergency

Abdul Ghani bin Abdul Aziz (Jawi: عبدالغني بن عبدالعزيز; born 7 November 1944), is a Malaysian retired-military officer who served as the 10th Chief of Air Force from March 1993 to August 1996.

== Early life and education ==
Abdul Ghani was born on 7 November 1944 in Alor Setar and he was raised in Taiping, Perak. His father, Abdul Aziz Zain was the 2nd Attorney General of Brunei from 1961 to 1963. He received his education at King Edward VII School, Taiping but he left at form four to continue his education at Malay College Kuala Kangsar.

He once took a course in civil engineering at Technical College, Kuala Lumpur (later known as University of Technology Malaysia) for a year before he joined as a cadet officer at Federation Military College, Sungai Besi in 1964. He also graduated master in International Relations and Strategic Studies from University of Lancaster in 1981 and master in Arts (Politics) from Royal College of Defence Studies in 1991.

== Military career ==
On 11 March 1993, his predecessor, Mohd Yunus Mohd Tasi handed over chief of Air Force position to Ghani as acting-chief and Ghani held that position definitively on 19 March 1993 and he got rank promotion to lieutenant general. The position he held until his retirement and he passed the baton to his successor, Ahmad Saruji Che Rose on 9 August 1996.

== Honours ==
=== Honours of Malaysia ===
- Malaysia
  - Commander of the Order of Loyalty to the Crown of Malaysia (PSM) – Tan Sri (2012)
  - Companion of the Order of the Defender of the Realm (JMN) (1992)
  - Officer of the Order of the Defender of the Realm (KMN) (1982)
  - Recipient of the General Service Medal (PPA)
  - Recipient of the Malaysian Commemorative Medal (Bronze) (PPM (G))
  - Recipient of the 10th Yang di-Pertuan Agong Installation Medal
- Malaysian Armed Forces
  - Courageous Commander of the Most Gallant Order of Military Service (PGAT)
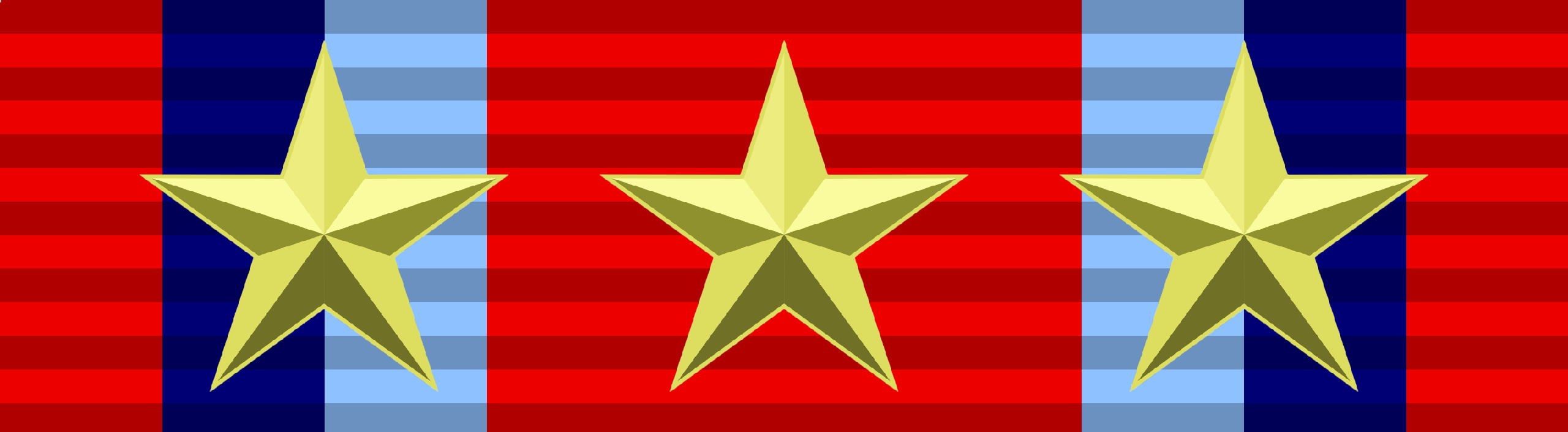
  - Loyal Commander of the Most Gallant Order of Military Service (PSAT) (1990)
  - Recipient of the Air Force Medal (PTU) (1987)
  - Recipient of the Malaysian Service Medal (PJM)
- Kedah
  - Knight Commander of the Order of the Crown of Kedah (DPMK) – Dato' (1995)
- Pahang
  - Knight Grand Companion of the Order of the Crown of Pahang (SIMP) – formerly Dato', now Dato' Indera (1993)
  - Knight Companion of the Order of the Crown of Pahang (DIMP) – Dato' (1986)
- Perak
  - Knight Grand Commander of the Order of Taming Sari (SPTS) – Dato' Seri Panglima (1994)
- Sabah
  - Star of the Order of Kinabalu (BK)

=== Foreign honours ===
- Indonesia
  - First Class (Utama) of the Star of Swa Bhuwana Paksa (1995)
- Jordan
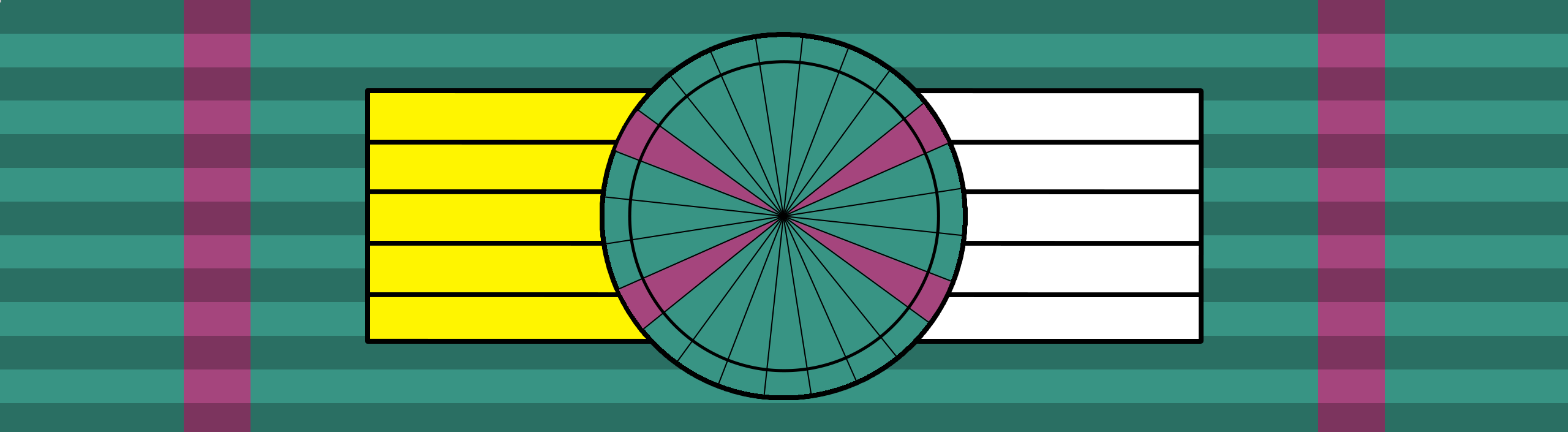
  - Grand Officer of the Order of the Star of Jordan (1989)
