= Muhamad Norazlan Aris =

21st Chief of Royal Malaysian Air Force (2025–present)

Yang Berbahagia General Tan Sri Dato' Sri Muhamad Norazlan Aris PGAT PSM SSAP SIMP SSMZ DGSM PSAT DSPK SMW DPKK DIMP PAT KAT KMN AMN PPS PPA PJM PKN
- محمد نورازلان أريس

21st Chief of Air Force
- Incumbent
- Assumed office 26 June 2025
- Monarch: Ibrahim
- Minister: Mohamed Khaled Nordin
- Preceded by: Mohd Asghar Khan Goriman Khan

Personal details
- Born: Muhamad Norazlan bin Aris; 9 November 1967 (age 58) Kota Tinggi, Johor, Malaysia
- Spouse: Wan Nor Sazlina Wan Abd Shukor
- Children: 4
- Education: Royal Military College, Kuala Lumpur; University Malaya; University of Wollongong; Royal College of Defence Studies
- Nickname: "Giro"

Military service
- Allegiance: Malaysia
- Branch/service: Royal Malaysian Air Force
- Years of service: 1987–present
- Rank: General
- Battles/wars: Second Malayan Emergency; Operation Daulat

Muhamad Norazlan bin Aris (Jawi: محمد نورازلان بن أريس; born 9 November 1967) is a Malaysian military officer who currently serves as the 21st Chief of Royal Malaysian Air Force since 26 June 2025. Prior to his appointment, he previously served as the Deputy Chief of the Royal Malaysian Air Force from 28 June 2022 to 25 June 2025.

== Early life and education ==
Norazlan was born on 9 November 1967 in Kota Tinggi, Johor. In 1985, he joined the Malaysian Armed Forces at the Royal Military College, Sungai Besi Camp as Officer cadet until 1987. He is a graduate of the Malaysian Armed Forces Staff College in Kuala Lumpur and the Royal College of Defence Studies (RCDS) in London. He is also an alumnus of University of Malaya in 2001 who graduated Diploma in Strategic & Defence Studies and he graduated Master's degree in Maritime Policy from University of Wollongong in 2012.

== Military career ==
Norazlan was commissioned as a Second Lieutenant in 1987 and received his basic training at the Air Force Academy, RMAF Alor Setar, Kedah in 1988 and after completing the training he was selected to fly fighter aircraft. Throughout his service, he has been entrusted to hold various important positions in the Royal Malaysian Air Force as commander, staff and trainer. The positions that he held include Staff Officer 1 Fighter Operations at 1st Air Division, Commanding Officer of 11th Squadron, Commander of RMAF Gong Kedak Air Base, Deputy Assistant Chief of Staff of Planning and Development, Chief of Staff of Air Operations Command Headquarters and Commander of Air Support Command.

Norazlan was appointed as Commander of Air Operations Command on 8 March 2022 who succeeding Mohammad Salleh Osman who appointed as Deputy Chief of Air Force. On 28 June in the same year, he was appointed as Deputy Chief of Air Force following the retirement of his predecessor Mohammad Salleh Osman.

On 26 June 2025, Norazlan has appointed as 21st Chief of Royal Malaysian Air Force who succeeding Mohd Asghar Khan Goriman Khan following his retirement in this year.

== Personal life ==
He has married with Wan Nor Sazlina binti Wan Abd Shukor and is blessed with four daughters. On free time, he often spent that time for leisure activities and travelling.

== Honours ==
=== Honours of Malaysia ===
- Malaysia
  - Commander of the Order of Loyalty to the Crown of Malaysia (PSM) – Tan Sri (2026)
  - Officer of the Order of the Defender of the Realm (KMN) (2010)
  - Member of the Order of the Defender of the Realm (AMN)
  - Recipient of the Loyal Service Medal (PPS)
  - Recipient of the General Service Medal (PPA)
  - Recipient of the National Sovereignty Medal (PKN)
  - Recipient of the 17th Yang di-Pertuan Agong Installation Medal
- Malaysian Armed Forces
  - Courageous Commander of the Most Gallant Order of Military Service (PGAT) (2025)
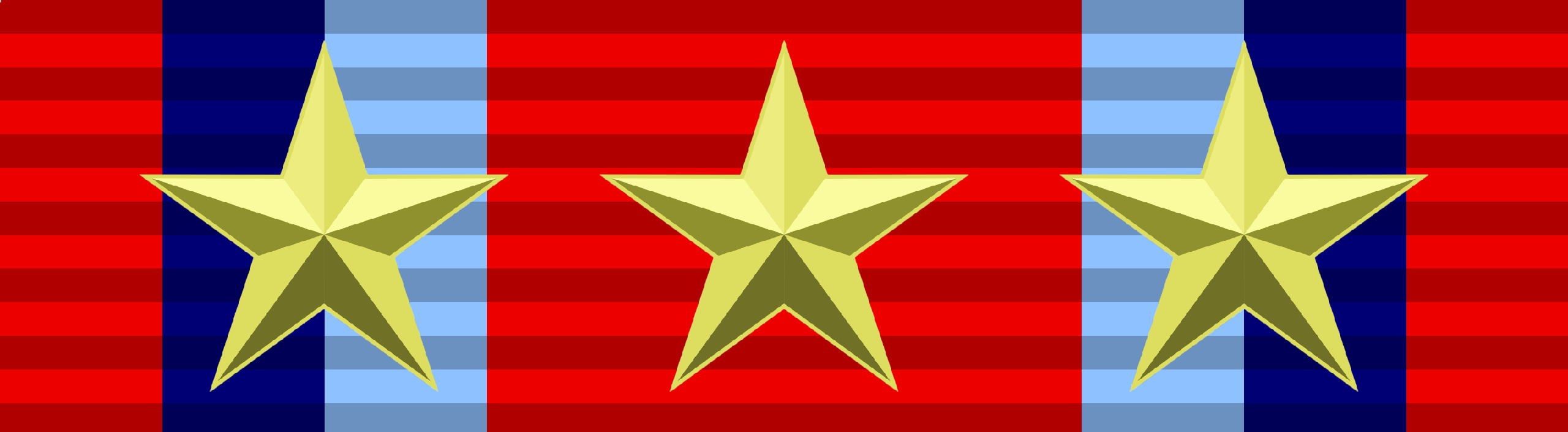
  - Loyal Commander of the Most Gallant Order of Military Service (PSAT) (2019)
  - Warrior of the Most Gallant Order of Military Service (PAT)
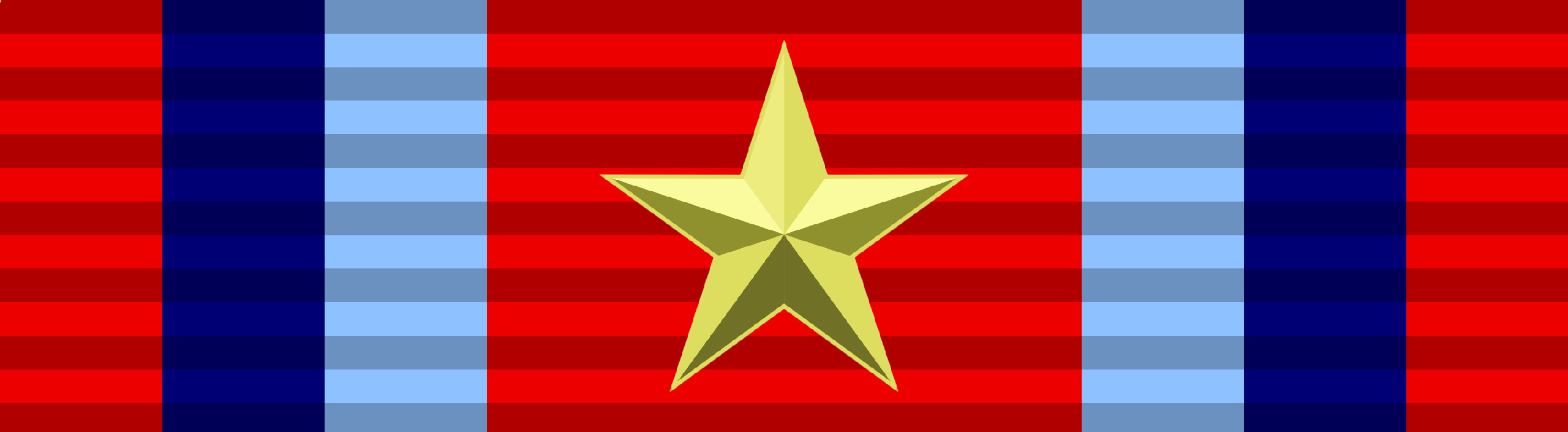
  - Officer of the Most Gallant Order of Military Service (KAT)
  - Recipient of the Malaysian Service Medal (PJM)
- Federal Territory (Malaysia)
  - Grand Commander of the Order of the Territorial Crown (SMW) – Datuk Seri (2023)
- Kedah
  - Knight Commander of the Glorious Order of the Loyal Warrior of Kedah (DSPK) – Dato' Pahlawan (2023)
- Kelantan
  - Knight Commander of the Order of the Noble Crown of Kelantan (DPKK) – Dato' (2025)
- Malacca
  - Grand Commander of the Exalted Order of Malacca (DGSM) – Datuk Seri (2026)
- Pahang
  - Knight Grand Companion of the Order of Sultan Ahmad Shah of Pahang (SSAP) – Dato' Sri (2024)
  - Knight Grand Companion of the Order of the Crown of Pahang (SIMP) – Dato' Indera (2021)
  - Knight Companion of the Order of the Crown of Pahang (DIMP) – Dato' (2015)
- Terengganu
  - Knight Grand Companion of the Order of Sultan Mizan Zainal Abidin of Terengganu (SSMZ) – Dato' Seri (2026)
