= Affendi Buang =

Malaysian general

Yang Berbahagia General (Rtd) Tan Sri Dato' Sri Haji Affendi Buang PGAT PMN PSM SPKK SSAP DPPN SPTS DGSM PNBS PSAT DIMP PAT SAP KAT AMP PTU PPS PPA PJM PKN DUBC DPKT AO PM
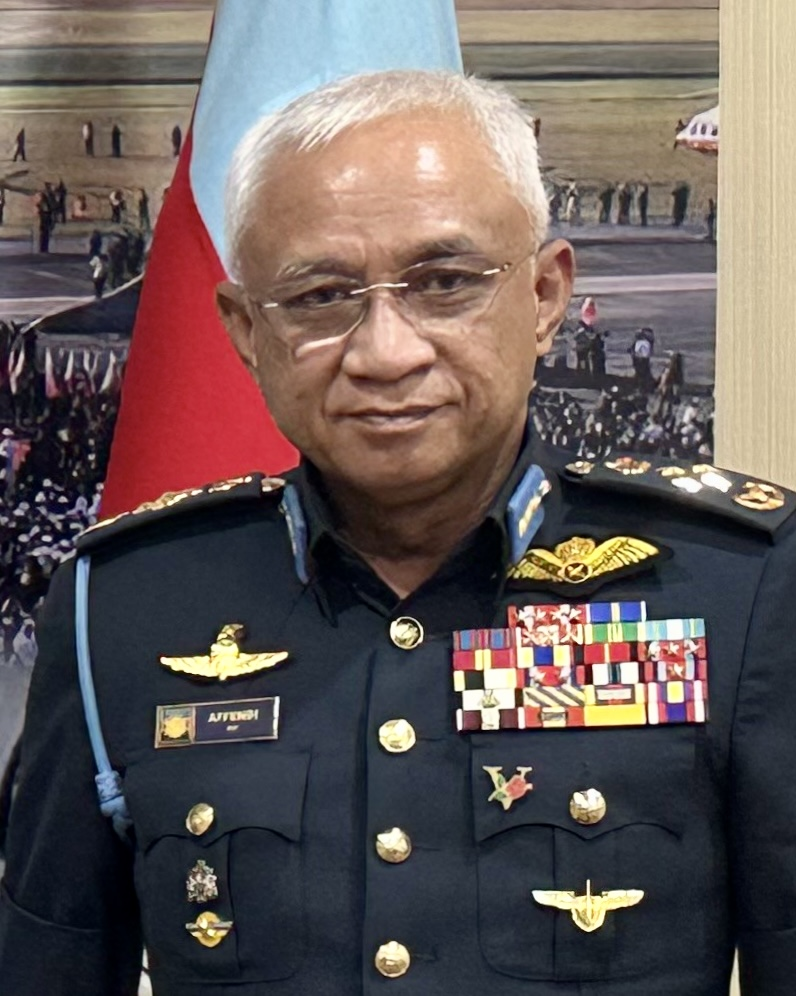
- General Affendi in 2023

21st Chief of Defence Forces
- In office 2 January 2020 – 5 September 2023
- Monarch: Abdullah
- Minister of Defence: Mohamad Sabu; Ismail Sabri Yaakob; Hishammuddin Hussein; Mohamad Hasan
- Preceded by: Zulkifli Zainal Abidin
- Succeeded by: Mohammad Ab Rahman

18th Chief of Air Force
- In office 21 December 2016 – 2 January 2020
- Preceded by: Roslan Saad
- Succeeded by: Ackbal Abdul Samad

Personal details
- Born: 21 August 1962 (age 64) Kuching, Crown Colony of Sarawak (now Sarawak, Malaysia)
- Spouse: Tengku Muhaini Sultan Ahmad Shah
- Relatives: Abdullah of Pahang (brother in law)
- Education: Royal Military College (Malaysia)

Military service
- Allegiance: Malaysia
- Branch/service: Royal Malaysian Air Force
- Years of service: 1980 - 2023
- Rank: General
- Unit: Chief of Defence Forces; Chief of Air Force; Deputy Chief of the Air Force; Director General for Operations and Exercises, RMAF Air Operations Command; Director of J5 (Contingencies and Plans); 19 Squadron
- Battles/wars: Communist insurgency in Malaysia (1968–89)

Affendi bin Haji Buang (born 21 August 1962) is a Malaysian Air Force General who served as the 21st Chief of Defence Forces. Prior to his assignment, he previously served as the Chief of Air Force.

== Background ==
He was born at Kuching, Sarawak on 21 August 1962. He finished his early education at his hometown, and completed his education at the Royal Military College, at Sungai Besi, until he finished his Malaysian Certificate of Examination in 1979.

He joined the Malaysian Armed Forces in 1980 as an RMAF Officer Cadet, and received his basic training at the Officer Cadet School, Sebatang Kara, at Port Dickson. He was commissioned as a Second Lieutenant in 1982, and was assigned to No 3 Flying Training Centre at Sultan Haji Ahmad Shah Airport in Kuantan.

He attended various courses and seminars in the country and abroad, such as the Malaysian Armed Forces Staff College in 1997, the Defences and Strategic Studies Course at the Centre for Defence and Strategic Studies at Australia in 2005, and the Royal College of Defence Studies at London in 2011. He also holds a Master of Art (Strategic Studies) at the Deakin University, Australia.

A trained and skilled fighter pilot, he flew various aircraft including the Aermacchi MB-339, the Douglas A-4 Skyhawk, and the Mikoyan MiG-29, and performed various air support and interdiction missions. He was also among the founding officers of the "Smokey Bandits" Aerobatics Team. He rose through the ranks until he was promoted as the Director General for Operations and Exercises, RMAF Air Operations Command in 2014, became the Deputy Chief of the Air Force in 2015, became the Chief of Air Force in 2016–2020, and became the Chief of Defence Forces on January 2, 2020. On 19 February 2020, he met with Prime Minister Mahathir Mohamad.

== Honours ==
- Malaysia
  - Commander of the Order of the Defender of the Realm (PMN) – Tan Sri (2020)
  - Commander of the Order of Loyalty to the Crown of Malaysia (PSM) – Tan Sri (2017)
  - Recipient of the Loyal Service Medal (PPS)
  - Recipient of the General Service Medal (PPA)
  - Recipient of the National Sovereignty Medal (PKN)
  - Recipient of the 12th Yang di-Pertuan Agong Installation Medal
  - Recipient of the 13th Yang di-Pertuan Agong Installation Medal
  - Recipient of the 14th Yang di-Pertuan Agong Installation Medal
  - Recipient of the 16th Yang di-Pertuan Agong Installation Medal
- Malaysian Armed Forces
  - Courageous Commander of the Most Gallant Order of Military Service (PGAT, 2017)
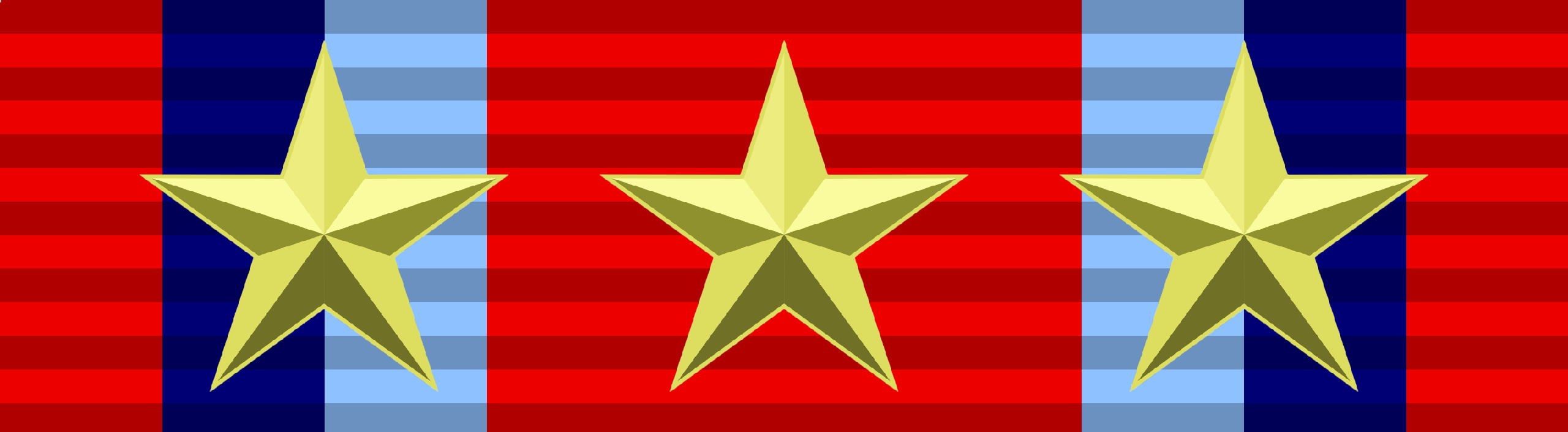
  - Loyal Commander of the Most Gallant Order of Military Service (PSAT)
  - Warrior of the Most Gallant Order of Military Service (PAT)
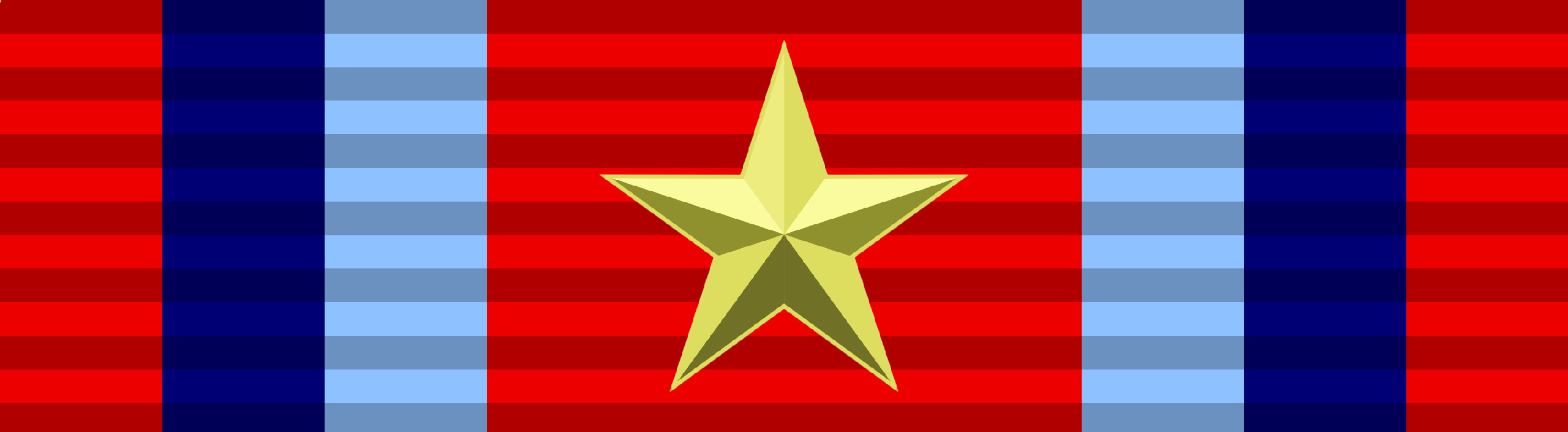
  - Officer of the Most Gallant Order of Military Service (KAT)
  - Recipient of the Air Force Medal (PTU, 1990)
  - Recipient of the Malaysian Service Medal (PJM)
- Kelantan
  - Knight Grand Commander of the Order of the Noble Crown of Kelantan (SPKK) – Dato’ (2018)
- Malacca
  - Grand Commander of the Exalted Order of Malacca (DGSM) – Datuk Seri (2020)
- Pahang
  - Knight Grand Companion of the Order of Sultan Ahmad Shah of Pahang (SSAP) – Dato' Sri (2014)
  - Knight Companion of the Order of the Crown of Pahang (DIMP) – Dato' (2008)
  - Companion of the Order of Sultan Ahmad Shah of Pahang (SAP, 2003)
  - Member of the Order of the Crown of Pahang (AMP)
  - Recipient of the Sultan Ahmad Shah Silver Jubilee Medal (1999)
- Penang
  - Knight Commander of the Order of the Defender of State (DPPN) – Dato’ Seri (2019)
- Perak
  - Knight Grand Commander of the Order of Taming Sari (SPTS) – Dato’ Seri Panglima (2020)
- Sarawak
  - Knight Commander of the Order of the Star of Sarawak (PNBS) – Dato Sri (2020)

=== Foreign honours ===
- Australia
  - Honorary Officer of the Order of Australia (AO, 19 April 2023)
- Brunei
  - Grand Commander of the Order of Paduka Keberanian Laila Terbilang (DPKT) – Dato Paduka Seri (15 July 2022)
- France
  - Commander of the National Order of the Legion of Honour (19 May 2026)
- Singapore
  - Recipient of the Darjah Utama Bakti Cemerlang (Tentera) (DUBC, 16 February 2022)
- Thailand
  - Knight Grand Cross of the Order of the Crown of Thailand (PM, 21 March 2024)
