= Ackbal Abdul Samad =

19th Chief of Air Force (Malaysia)

Yang Berbahagia General (Rtd) Tan Sri Ackbal Abdul Samad PGAT PSM PJN SSAP SIMP DPPN PSAT DPKK DSAP DIMP PAT JSM SAP SMP KAT AMN AAP PPS PPA PJM
- اکبال عبدالصمد

19th Chief of Air Force
- In office 3 January 2020 – 4 March 2022
- Monarch: Abdullah
- Prime Minister: Mahathir Mohamad (2020); Muhyiddin Yassin (2020–2021); Ismail Sabri Yaakob (2021–2022)
- Minister of Defence: Mohamad Sabu (2020); Ismail Sabri Yaakob (2020–2021); Hishammuddin Hussein (2021–2022)
- Preceded by: Affendi Buang
- Succeeded by: Mohd Asghar Khan Goriman Khan

Personal details
- Born: 4 September 1962 (age 64) Johor, Federation of Malaya
- Spouse: Norainy Shahar Alam
- Children: 4
- Education: Royal Military College, Kuala Lumpur

Military service
- Allegiance: Malaysia
- Branch/service: Royal Malaysian Air Force
- Years of service: 1980–2022
- Rank: General
- Battles/wars: Second Malayan Emergency

Ackbal bin Abdul Samad (Jawi: اکبال بن حاج عبد الصمد; born 4 September 1962) is a Malaysian retired-military officer who served as the 19th Chief of Air Force from January 2020 to March 2022.

== Early life and education ==
Ackbal was born on 4 September 1962 in Johor as the first son of four siblings. He raised in Klang, Selangor before moved to Petaling Jaya in the late '70s. He received his secondary education at Royal Military College, Kuala Lumpur from 1978 to 1980 before joined to Royal Malaysian Air Force on 1 June 1980.

== Military career ==
=== Early career ===
After completed officer cadet course, Ackbal was commissioned to Junior lieutenant in 1982 and the next year, he attend to basic flying course with Pilatus PC-7 at RMAF Alor Setar Air Base before he transferred to RMAF Kuantan Air Base for fighter flight transition course with Aermacchi MB-339 at 3rd Flying Training Centre.

From 1985 to 1990, Ackbal was posted as fighter pilot at some squadrons. First, at 9th Squadron, RMAF Kuantan Air Base as pilot of Douglas A-4 Skyhawk from 1985 to 1988. Then at 6th Squadron, RMAF Labuan Air Base as pilot of F-5E from 1988 to 1990 before he selected by the RMAF Special Panel to undergo test pilot course in United Kingdom for 1993–1994 session and continued by flight transition course for MiG-29N in Russia. After completed those courses, he assigned to form then command the 19th Squadron in RMAF Kuantan Air Base and this position he held until 1999.

=== Career advancement ===
After 17 years active in service as operations pilot, Ackbal was get opportunity to serve in various positions, including as Staff officer for Safety and Standards at 1st Air Division in 2000, Director of Planning and Development at RMAF Headquarters from 2002 to 2004, Commander of RMAF Kuantan Air Base from October 2004 to February 2006, Commander of 2nd Air Division from March 2006 to January 2007, Commander of Air Support Command from February 2007 to September 2010 and Commander of 1st Air Division from September to November 2010 before he promoted to lieutenant general and appointed as Commader of Air Operations Command.

On 17 November 2014, Ackbal appointed as Joint Force Commander and this position he held until 3 September 2015 before he transferred back as Commander of Air Operations Command. On 21 December 2016, he appointed as Deputy Chief of Air Force.

=== Chief of Air Force ===
Ackbal was appointed as 19th Chief of Royal Malaysian Air Force on 3 January 2020 succeeding Affendi Buang who appointed as 21st Chief of Defence Forces. That position he held until 4 March 2022 before entering the retirement period in December of the same year and succeeded by Mohd Asghar Khan Goriman Khan.

== Personal life ==
Ackbal married with Norainy binti Shahar Alam and blessed with three sons and one daughter.

== Honours ==
- Malaysia
  - Commander of the Order of Loyalty to the Crown of Malaysia (PSM) – Tan Sri (2020)
  - Commander of the Order of Meritorious Service (PJN) – Datuk (2013)
  - Companion of the Order of Loyalty to the Crown of Malaysia (JSM) (2009)
  - Member of the Order of the Defender of the Realm (AMN) (1997)
  - Recipient of the Loyal Service Medal (PPS)
  - Recipient of the General Service Medal (PPA)
  - Recipient of the 12th Yang di-Pertuan Agong Installation Medal (2002)
- Malaysian Armed Forces
  - Courageous Commander of The Most Gallant Order of Military Service (PGAT) (2021)
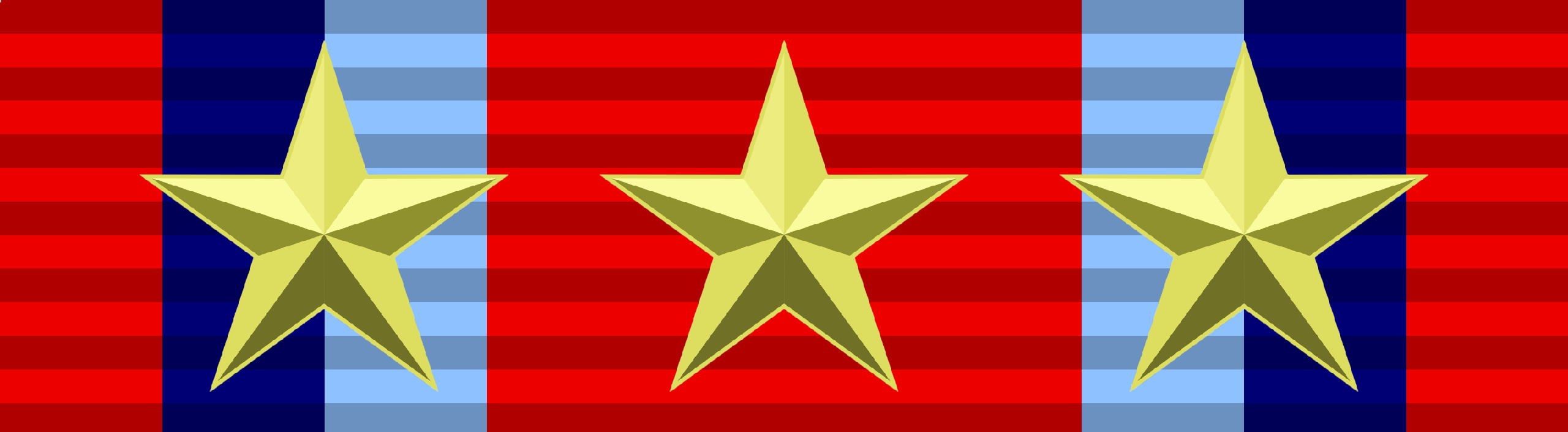
  - Loyal Commander of the Most Gallant Order of Military Service (PSAT)
  - Warrior of the Most Gallant Order of Military Service (PAT)
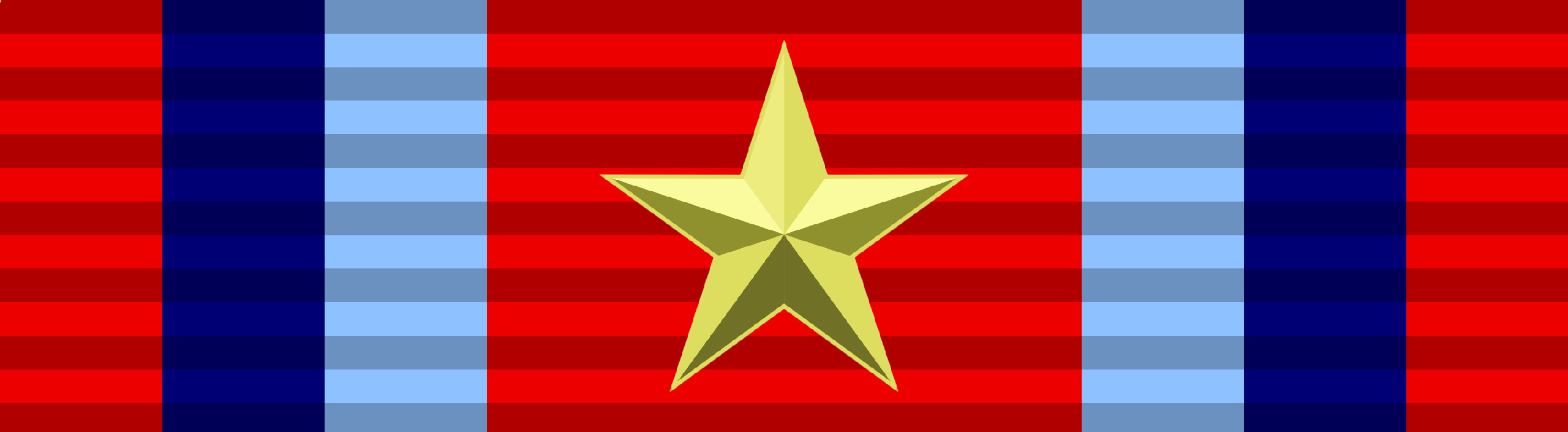
  - Officer of the Most Gallant Order of Military Service (KAT)
  - Recipient of the Malaysian Service Medal (PJM)
- Kelantan
  - Knight Commander of the Order of the Noble Crown of Kelantan (DPKK) – Dato' (2019)
- Pahang
  - Knight Grand Companion of the Order of Sultan Ahmad Shah of Pahang (SSAP) – Dato' Sri (2011)
  - Knight Grand Companion of the Order of the Crown of Pahang (SIMP) – Dato' Indera (2010)
  - Knight Companion of the Order of Sultan Ahmad Shah of Pahang (DSAP) – Dato' (2009)
  - Knight Companion of the Order of the Crown of Pahang (DIMP) – Dato' (2006)
  - Companion of the Order of Sultan Ahmad Shah of Pahang (SAP) (2005)
  - Companion of the Order of the Crown of Pahang (SMP) (2003)
  - Member of the Order of Sultan Ahmad Shah of Pahang (AAP) (2002)
- Penang
  - Knight Commander of the Order of the Defender of State (DPPN) – Dato' Seri (2020)
