= Lee Toong Leon =

Malaysian businessperson

Lee Toong Leon, better known as Leon Lee, is a Malaysian businessperson in Penang, Kuala Lumpur, Malaysia who received the Distinguished Conduct Medal (Pingat Kelakuan Terpuji) in 2016 and the Meritorious Service Medal (Pingat Jasa Kebaktian) in 2010 by Penang State Governor, Tun Abdul Rahman Abbas for his services to the state.
