= Azizan Ariffin =

Malaysian general (born 1952)

Yang Berbahagia General (Rtd) Tan Sri Dato' Sri Azizan Ariffin PGAT PMN PSM SSAP SIMP DGPN SPTS PNBS DHMS PSAT DSAP DSDK PAT JMN JSD KAT PPS PPA PJM CLH DPKT PM DUBC
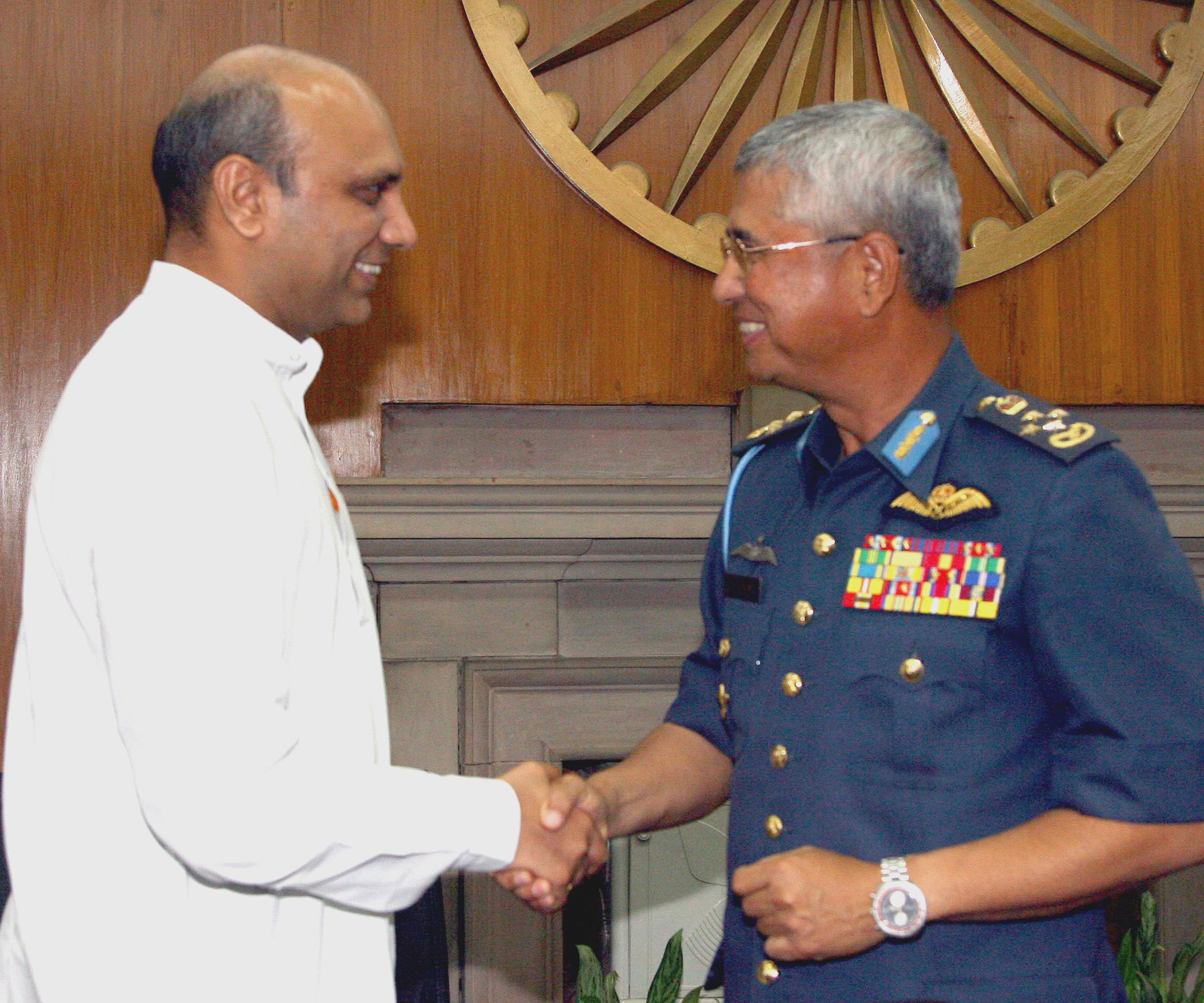
- Pallam Raju and General Azizan in 2009

17th Chief of Defence Forces
- In office 1 September 2009 – 15 June 2011
- Monarch: Mizan Zainal Abidin
- Prime Minister: Najib Razak
- Minister of Defence: Ahmad Zahid Hamidi
- Preceded by: Abdul Aziz Zainal
- Succeeded by: Zulkifeli Mohd. Zin

15th Chief of Air Force
- In office 30 October 2006 – 31 August 2009
- Preceded by: Nik Ismail Nik Mahmud RMAF
- Succeeded by: Rodzali Daud RMAF

Personal details
- Born: Azizan bin Ariffin; 25 October 1952 (age 73) Yan, Kedah, Federation of Malaya (now Malaysia)
- Spouse: Noorainee Abd Rahim
- Children: 5
- Education: Royal Military College; Air Command and Staff College; Indian National Defence College
- Occupation: Businessman
- Civilian awards: Commander of the Order of the Defender of the Realm (PMN)

Military service
- Allegiance: Malaysia; Yang di-Pertuan Agong
- Branch/service: Royal Malaysian Air Force
- Years of service: 1969–2011
- Rank: General
- Unit: RMAF Air Traffic Control Branch; Taming Sari Team (RMAF Acrobatic Team)
- Commands: RMAF VIP Squadron; Chief Instructor, Air Force Flying Academy; Advisor of Islamabad Defence, Pakistan; Commander (Training), Royal Malaysian Air Force Command; RMAF 2nd Air Division; Air Force College; Malaysian Armed Forces Academy; RMAF Air Operation
- Military awards: Courageous Commander of the Order of Military Service (PGAT); Courageous Commander of the Order of Military Service; Officer of the Order of Military Service; Warrior of the Order of Military Service; Air Force pilot brevet

Azizan bin Ariffin (born 25 October 1952 in Yan) is the 17th and the former Chief of Defence Forces (Malay: Panglima Angkatan Tentera — PAT). He is the first ever head of the Malaysian Armed Forces (MAF) appointed from the Royal Malaysian Air Force (RMAF).

== Education ==
Azizan joined the Royal Malaysian Air Force (RMAF) on October 15, 1969. He later finished his training at Royal Military College on April 16, 1971 and commissioned as Pilot officer (Nato OF-1).

After graduating, he was absorbed into Air Traffic Control (ATC) Branch and then was sent to Australia for basic and advance ATC course for two years. His first ever job in RMAF was as an ATC Officer at Kuala Lumpur RMAF Air Base. He was later assigned to Paya Lebar Air Base, Singapore and then Kuantan RMAF Air Base, both as an ATC Officer.

Azizan began his training as an aviator after being sent to Basic Aviation Course in Australia on April 15, 1976. He was given his pilot brevet on July 8, 1977.

== Military career ==
Azizan has had a successful air force aviator career. He has flown varieties of aircraft in RMAF arsenal including CT/4s, Aermacchi MB-326H, Bulldog B 100, Cessna 402B, BAe 125, Fokker F28, Pilatus PC-7, Falcon 900 and also C-130 Hercules.

Among the tasks he has held include Squadron Leader in VIP Squadron and examiner, chief instructor and instructor at the RMAF Flying Academy. He also was a member of the RMAF Acrobatic Team — the Taming Sari Team.

Azizan was promoted to Lieutenant Colonel and began to work in command and staff related task at all three branches of the Malaysian Armed Forces. Among the important tasks he has held include as Defence Advisor for Islamabad, Pakistan, Director (Training) at the Air Force Command and Chief-of-staff for 2nd Air Division. Azizan then promoted to General officer in 1996 and given task as the Chief of 2nd Air Division. He was later appointed Commandant for Air Force College and Malaysian Armed Force Academy (Malay: Akademi Angkatan Tentera Malaysia — ATMA) (now National Defence University of Malaysia — UPNM).

Azizan then held position of Chief of Air Operation (Malay: Panglima Operasi Udara) and Deputy Chief of Air Force (Malay: Timbalan Panglima Tentera Udara) before appointed the 15th Chief of Air Force (Malay: Panglima Tentera Udara — PTU) on 30 October 2006.

On 1 September 2009, Azizan made history by becoming the first Chief of Defence Forces from RMAF. Azizan is the second non-army Chief of Defence Forces after Admiral Mohammad Anwar Mohd Nor. The Chief of Defence Forces' position is usually dominated by the Malaysian Army.

== Retirement from Armed Forces ==
After almost 41 years service in Armed Forces, General Tan Sri Azizan finally retired on June 15, 2011. His position as Perintah Ulung was then succeeded by General Tan Sri Zulkifeli Mohd Zin.

== Later work ==
After retirement, General Tan Sri Azizan started being involved in business.

== Honours ==
=== Honours of Malaysia ===
- Malaysia
  - Commander of the Order of the Defender of the Realm (PMN) – Tan Sri (2010)
  - Commander of the Order of Loyalty to the Crown of Malaysia (PSM) – Tan Sri (2007)
  - Companion of the Order of the Defender of the Realm (JMN) (2004)
  - Companion of the Order of Loyalty to the Royal Family of Malaysia (JSD) (1993)
  - Recipient of the Loyal Service Medal (PPS)
  - Recipient of the General Service Medal (PPA)
  - Recipient of the 12th Yang di-Pertuan Agong Installation Medal
  - Recipient of the 13th Yang di-Pertuan Agong Installation Medal
- Malaysian Armed Forces
  - Courageous Commander of the Most Gallant Order of Military Service (PGAT)
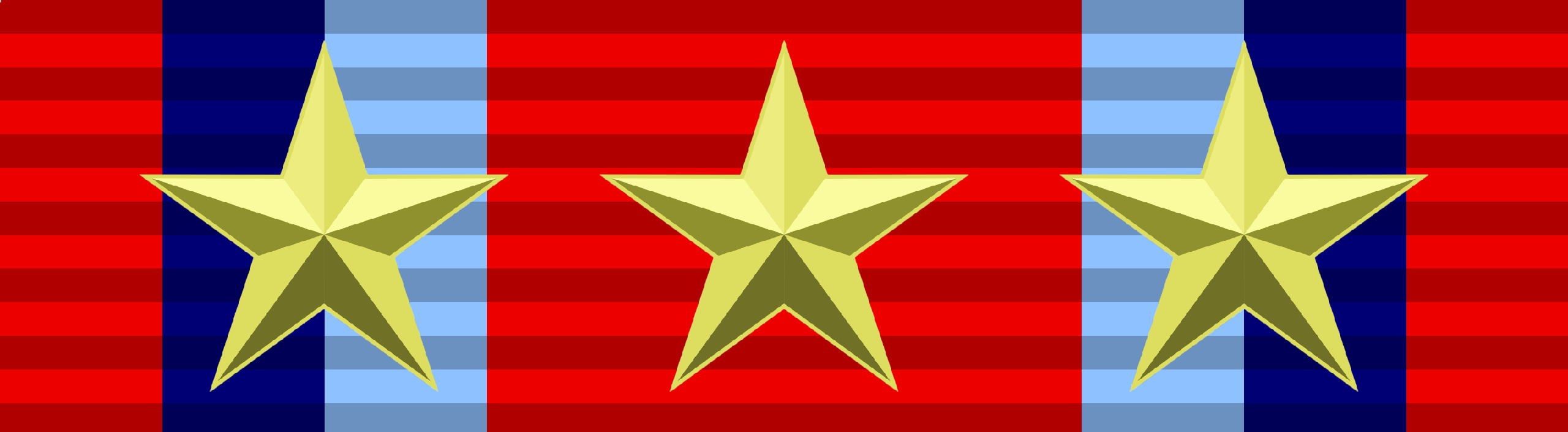
  - Loyal Commander of the Most Gallant Order of Military Service (PSAT)
  - Warrior of the Most Gallant Order of Military Service (PAT)
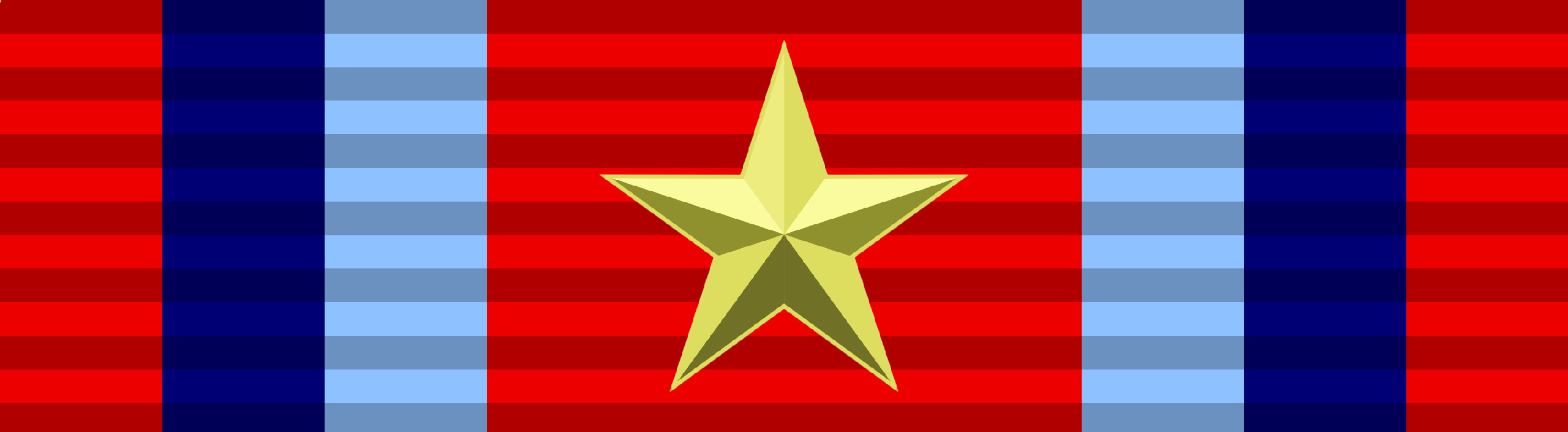
  - Officer of the Most Gallant Order of Military Service (KAT)
  - Recipient of the Malaysian Service Medal (PJM)
- Kedah
  - Knight Commander of the Order of Loyalty to Sultan Abdul Halim Mu'adzam Shah (DHMS) – Dato' Paduka (2006)
  - Knight Companion of the Order of Loyalty to the Royal House of Kedah (DSDK) – Dato' (1999)
- Pahang
  - Knight Grand Companion of the Order of Sultan Ahmad Shah of Pahang (SSAP) – Dato' Sri (2006)
  - Grand Knight of the Order of the Crown of Pahang (SIMP) – Dato' Indera (2004)
  - Knight Companion of the Order of Sultan Ahmad Shah of Pahang (DSAP) – Dato' (2003)
  - Recipient of the Sultan Ahmad Shah Silver Jubilee Medal (1999)
- Penang
  - Commander of the Order of the Defender of State (DGPN) – Dato' Seri (2010)
- Perak
  - Knight Grand Commander of the Order of Taming Sari (SPTS) – Dato' Seri Panglima (2008)
- Sarawak
  - Knight Commander of the Order of the Star of Sarawak (PNBS) – Dato Sri (2010)

=== Foreign Honours ===
- Brunei
  - First Class of the Order of Paduka Keberanian Laila Terbilang (DPKT) – Dato Paduka Seri (2010)
- Indonesia
  - First Class (Utama) of the Star of Yudha Dharma (2011)
- Philippines
  - Commander of the Philippine Legion of Honor (CLH) (2009)
- Singapore
  - Recipient of the Darjah Utama Bakti Cemerlang (Tentera) – (DUBC) (2011)
- Thailand
  - Knight Grand Cross of the Order of the Crown of Thailand (PM) (2010)

== Personal life ==
General Tan Sri Azizan married Puan Sri Noorainee Abd Rahim. They have five children.
