= Chaintri =

- Village
- Location in Pakistan
- Coordinates: 34°12′39″N 72°57′10″E
- Country: Pakistan
- Region: Khyber Pakhtunkhwa
- District: Abbottabad District
- Time zone: UTC+5 (PST)
  - Summer (DST): UTC+6 (PDT)

Chaintri is a village in Beer, Haripur District in northeastern Pakistan. It is located at 34°12'39N 72°57'10E and lies to the northwest of Lakhala and to the southeast of Dairi. Chaintri is said to be noted for its white joria wool.
