= Malaysian Armed Forces Council =

The Malaysian Armed Forces Council is a Malaysian military body established under Article 137 of the Constitution of Malaysia and is the constitutional body responsible (under the general authority of the King as Supreme Commander) for the command, discipline and administration of Malaysia's armed forces. It is composed of the following members;

- The Minister of Defence
- One member appointed by the Conference of Rulers
- The Chief of the Armed Forces Staff, who is appointed by the King of Malaysia
- The Secretary General of Defence Ministry
- Two senior staff officers of the army, appointed by the King
- A senior officer of the navy, appointed by the King
- A senior officer of the air force, appointed by the King
- Up to two other members, appointed by the King

== Current members ==
=== Permanent members ===
#	Name	Official Office	Ref
1	Dato' Seri Mohamed Khaled Nordin, Chairman	Minister of Defense	
2	Dato' Isham Ishak	Secretary General, Ministry of Defense	
3	Tan Sri Syed Danial Syed Ahmad, Royal Representative	Keeper of the Rulers' Seal	
4	General Datuk Malek Razak Sulaiman MA	Chief of Defence Forces	
5	General Dato' Azhan Md Othman	Chief of Army	
6	Admiral Tan Sri Zulhelmy Ithnain	Chief of Navy	
7	General Dato' Sri Muhamad Norazlan Aris	Chief of Air Force	
8	Dato' Mohtar Mohd Abd Rahman	Deputy Director General of Public Service (Development)	
9	Lieutenant General Dato' Abu Muslim Ismail	Chief of Staff of Malaysian Armed Forces Headquarters	
10	Major General Datuk Wira Zamrose Mohd Zain	Assistant Chief of Staff Personnel Services, Ministry of Defense	

=== Joint members ===
#	Name	Official Office	Ref
1	Adly Zahari	Deputy Minister of Defense	
2	Datuk Hj. Ruji bin Hj. Ubi	Deputy Secretary General (Development), Ministry of Defense	
3	Mastura Ahmad Mustafa	Deputy Secretary General (Management), Ministry of Defense	
4	Ahmad Nadzri bin Mohd Hassan	Deputy Secretary General (Policy), Ministry of Defense	
5	Shahrizat Ismail, Legal Advisor	Chief Judge Advocate, Ministry of Defense	

=== Secretariat ===
#	Name	Official Office	Ref
1	S. Rizuan Saidi	Principal Assistant Secretary, Ministry of Defense	
2	Lieutenant Colonel Abu Hasan Assha'ari Kamis @ Shaffiee	Staff Officer, Ministry of Defense	

Source :
