= Abdul Aziz Zain =

Malaysian businessman and judge

Yang Berbahagia Tan Sri Dato' Abdul Aziz Zain PSM DJMK PMK PJK
- عبدالعزيز زاين
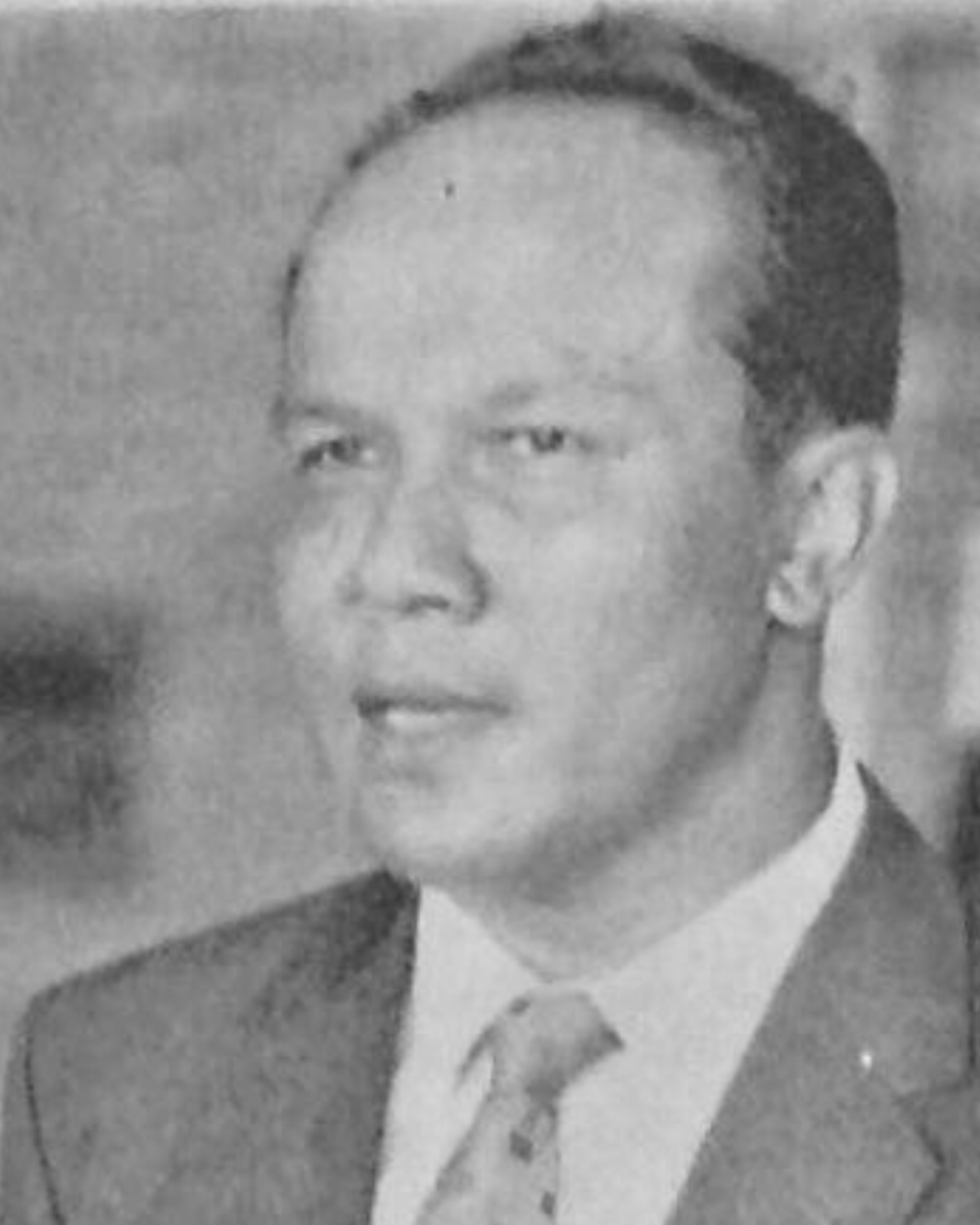
- Abdul Aziz in 1961

2nd Attorney General of Brunei
- In office 20 September 1961 – 15 January 1963
- Monarch: Omar Ali Saifuddien III
- Preceded by: Ali Hassan
- Succeeded by: Idris Talog Davies

Personal details
- Born: November 10, 1922 Kepala Batas, Penang, British Malaya
- Died: January 12, 2012 (aged 89) Bukit Pantai, Kuala Lumpur, Malaysia
- Resting place: Taman Titiwangsa Muslim Cemetery
- Spouse: Fatimah Zahirin
- Children: 6; including Abdul Ghani
- Education: Middle Temple
- Profession: Judge and businessman

Tan Sri Dato' Paduka Abdul Aziz bin Mohamed Zain (10 November 1922 – 12 January 2012) was a Malaysian barrister, judge and businessman whom formerly took office as the second Attorney General of Brunei from 1961 to 1963.

== Early life and education ==
On 10 November 1922, Abdul Aziz was born in Kepala Batas, Penang. In 1951, he graduated from Middle Temple in London with a law degree.

== Career ==
Before being appointed a magistrate in Taiping, Perak, in 1955, he started his public service career with the Kedah state administration. After that, he worked as a deputy public prosecutor in the state of Perak before being named a member of the Kuala Lumpur legal council in 1957. He served as the state's legal adviser for Kelantan and Terengganu in 1958. Before serving as Brunei's attorney general for two years beginning in 1961, he was appointed Perak's state legal adviser in 1960. He is also the founder and Deputy Chairman of Perkim and Chairman of Perkim from 1969 to 1971. Aziz then served as Malaysia's solicitor-general from 1963 until 1964, when he was appointed to the High Court, and from there to the Federal Court in 1970.

The reason Abdul Aziz served on the tribunal during the 1988 constitutional crisis that resulted in Tun Salleh Abbas' resignation as Lord President was questioned. He stated that he was given the Yang di-Pertuan Agong's order to sit on the tribunal. Even though Salleh was a very close friend of his, how could he refuse. Although he wasn't happy, he had to fulfill my obligations to the Yang di-Pertuan Agong. When asked if he had any regrets about how the tribunal had turned out, he responded with an equally concise response, "I entered and left with a clear conscience."

== Later life ==
From 1971 to 1973, he presided over the National Electricity Board. Subsequently, he served as chairman of the Bedford (M) Bhd, Kota Tanah Sdn Bhd, Kao (Malaysia) Sdn Bhd, and the Malaysian Institute of Management. He was also a trustee for the Council of Colleges Malaysia. When Tunku Abdul Rahman Putra served as secretary-general of the Organisation of the Islamic Conference (OIC) in 1973, Aziz served as Tunku's special assistant. He was not only a founding member and vice president of the Muslim Welfare Organization (PERKIM), but he also played a significant part in the establishment of a worldwide Islamic bank. He significantly contributed to the expansion of Anglia Ruskin University's involvement in a number of projects in Malaysia and Thailand.

== Death ==
At 6 am in his house in Bukit Pantai on 12 January 2012, Abdul Aziz died in his sleep at the age of 89. The Taman Titiwangsa Muslim Cemetery is where he was interred.

== Personal life ==
Abdul Aziz is married to Puan Sri Fatimah Zahirin, and together they have six children; including Abdul Ghani, Chief of Royal Malaysian Air Force.

== Bibliography ==
- Abd. Rahman, Zainatul Shuhaida (2005). Memoir Tan Sri Abdul Aziz Zain: negarawan tujuh zaman (in Malay). Versi Gemilang. ISBN 9789834286903.

== Awards and honours ==
=== Namesakes ===
- Tan Sri Dato' Abdul Aziz Mohammad Zain Jamek Mosque, also known as the Permatang Bogak Jamek Mosque, is situated in Permatang Bogak, Penaga and is anticipated to formally open on 29 April 2022.

=== Honours ===
As a result of Tan Sri Abdul Aziz's humanitarian and charity activity as well as his efforts on behalf of the Anglia Ruskin University, he was awarded an honorary Doctor of Laws in 1994. Moreover, he has earned the following honours;

- Order of Loyalty to the Crown of Malaysia (PSM) – Tan Sri
- Order of the Life of the Crown of Kelantan Knight Commander (DJMK) – Dato'
- Meritorious Service Medal (PJK)
- Mahkota Kedah Medal (PMK)

Legal offices
| Preceded by Ali Hassan | 2nd Attorney General of Brunei; 20 September 1961 – 15 January 1963 | Succeeded by Idris Talog Davies |
