= Dairi, Pakistan =

Pakistani village

Dairi
- Village
- Location in Pakistan
- Coordinates: 36°01′0″N 71°35′24″E
- Country: Pakistan
- Region: Khyber Pakhtunkhwa
- District: Chitral District
- Time zone: UTC+5 (PST)
  - Summer (DST): UTC+6 (PDT)

Dairi, also known as Deri, is a village in the Lower Chitral District of Khyber Pakhtunkwa, Pakistan. It is located at 36°1'0N 71°35'24E with an altitude of 2827 metres.
