= Chief of Air Force (Malaysia) =

Royal Malaysian Air Force appointment

- Panglima Tentera Udara ڤڠليما تنترا اودارا
- Crest of Chief of Air Force

- Incumbent; General Tan Sri Muhamad Norazlan Aris since 26 June 2025
- Royal Malaysian Air Force
- Style: Yang Berbahagia (The Honorable)
- Abbreviation: PTU
- Member of: Malaysian Armed Forces Council
- Reports to: Chief of Defence Forces
- Term length: Not fixed
- Precursor: Chief of Air Staff
- Formation: 30 November 1957
- First holder: Air Commodore Alexander Johnstone
- Salary: TURUS II
- Website: www.airforce.mil.my/index.php/en/profile-ptu

The Chief of Air Force (Malay: Panglima Tentera Udara, Jawi: ڤڠليما تنترا اودارا) is the most senior appointment in the Royal Malaysian Air Force and has been held by a four-star officer in the rank of General (equivalent to Air Chief Marshal) since 1996. The Chief of Air Force is a member of the Malaysian Armed Forces Council and directly reports to the Chief of Defence Forces (CDF).

The current Chief of Air Force is General Dato' Sri Mohd Asghar Khan Goriman Khan – who succeeded General Tan Sri Datuk Seri Ackbal Abdul Samad on 4 March 2022. General Tan Sri Affendi Buang promoted into CDF on 2 January 2020 thus making him the second Chief of Air Force ever to hold the highest post in the Malaysian Armed Forces.

== Appointees ==
Up to the year 2025, 21 people had appointed to the number 1 rank in the Royal Malaysian Air Force since 1957.

No.	Portrait	Name (birth–death)	Term of office			Branch of service	Ref.
No.	Portrait	Name (birth–death)	Took office	Left office	Time in office	Branch of service	Ref.
Deputy Chief of Staff (Air), Royal Malayan Air Force
1		Air commodore Sandy Johnstone (Note: Served in the Royal Air Force.) (1916–2000)	30 November 1957	4 September 1958	278 days	No. 602 Squadron	
Chief of Air Staff
2		Air commodore Nicol Challis Hyde (1910–1987)	5 September 1958	31 December 1959	1 year, 117 days		
3		Group captain John Nichol Stacey (1920–2003)	1 January 1960	19 May 1963	3 years, 138 days		
4		Group captain Cyril Stanley John West (1918–1977)	20 May 1963	13 May 1965	1 year, 358 days		
5		Air commodore Alasdair Steedman (1922–1992)	14 May 1965	31 October 1968	3 years, 170 days	No. 39 Squadron	
6		Air vice marshal Datuk; Sulaiman Sujak (born 1934)	1 November 1968	31 December 1976	8 years, 60 days	No. 84 Squadron	
7		Lieutenant general Dato'; Mohamed Taib (?–?)	1 January 1977	24 August 1983	6 years, 235 days		
Chief of Air Force
8		Lieutenant General Tan Sri Dato'; Mohamed Ngah Said (1938–2013)	24 August 1983	18 March 1991	7 years, 206 days	10 Squadron	
9		Lieutenant General Tan Sri; Mohd Yunus Mohd Tasi (born 1940)	19 March 1991	18 March 1993	1 year, 364 days		
10		Lieutenant General Dato' Seri; Abdul Ghani Abdul Aziz (born 1944)	19 March 1993	8 August 1996	3 years, 142 days		
11		General Tan Sri Dato' Seri; Ahmad Saruji Che Rose (born 1946)	9 August 1996	12 June 2001	4 years, 307 days		
12		General Dato' Sri; Suleiman Mahmud (born 1947)	12 June 2001	4 March 2003	1 year, 265 days		
13		General Dato' Sri; Abdullah Ahmad (born 1948)	4 March 2003	4 April 2004	1 year, 32 days		
14		General Tan Sri Dato' Sri; Nik Ismail Nik Mahmud (born 1951)	4 April 2004	30 October 2006	2 years, 210 days		
15		General Tan Sri Dato' Sri; Azizan Ariffin (born 1952)	30 October 2006	31 August 2009	2 years, 306 days	20 Squadron	
16		General Tan Sri Dato' Sri; Rodzali Daud (born 1955)	1 September 2009	11 September 2014	5 years, 10 days	No 3 Flying Training Centre	
17		General Tan Sri Dato' Sri; Roslan Saad (born 1956)	12 September 2014	20 December 2016	2 years, 99 days		
18		General Tan Sri Dato' Sri; Affendi Buang (born 1956)	21 December 2016	2 January 2020	3 years, 12 days		
19		General Tan Sri Dato' Sri; Ackbal Abdul Samad (born 1962)	3 January 2020	4 March 2022	2 years, 61 days		
20		General Tan Sri Dato' Sri; Mohd Asghar Khan Goriman Khan (born 1965)	7 March 2022	25 June 2025	3 years, 111 days		
21		General Dato' Sri; Muhamad Norazlan Aris (born 1967)	26 June 2025	Incumbent	1 year, 74 days	11th Squadron	

== See also ==
- Royal Malaysian Air Force
- Chief of Defence Forces (Malaysia)
- Chief of Army (Malaysia)
- Chief of Navy (Malaysia)
