= Beer, Haripur =

Coordinates: 34°10′0″N 72°58′0″E

Beer بیڑ
- Town and union council
- Interactive map of Beer
- Country: Pakistan
- Region: Khyber Pakhtunkhwa
- District: Haripur
- Time zone: UTC+5 (PST)
- Postal code: 22770

Beer, or Bir, (بیڑ) is one of the 44 union councils, administrative subdivisions, of Haripur District in the Khyber Pakhtunkhwa province of Pakistan. It is also a tourist site within the district of Haripur.

The village of Chaintri is part of Bir.
