= Royal Military College (Malaysia) =

All-boys military school in Malaysia

Royal Military College Maktab Tentera DiRaja RMC / MTD

Information
- Established: 3 July 1952; 71 years ago, as Federation Military College
- Country: Malaysia
- Number of students: 500 (annually)
- Motto: Serve to Lead, Berkhidmat Memimpin
- Nickname: Malaya's Sandhurst, Budak Boy, Soldier Boy, Putera
- Yearbook: The Bugler
- Alumni: Old Putera Association (OPA)
- Colours: Green, Yellow and Red
- Founder: Field Marshal Tun Sir Gerald Templer
- Website: www.rmc.edu.my

Royal Military College (Malay: Maktab Tentera DiRaja; abbreviated RMC) is an all-boys military school established to train young Malaysians for service in the Malaysian Armed Forces (MAF). It is sometimes dubbed "the Malaya's Sandhurst". On 9 December 1966, in a ceremony held at the college, HM Ismail Nasiruddin of Terengganu, the Yang Di-Pertuan Agong, conferred the "Royal" (Malay: DiRaja) title to the FMC. Hence since 1966, the former Federation Military College came to be known as the Royal Military College.

A current student of RMC is known as a Present Putera, while a graduate of the institution is known as an Old Putera or "OP" in short. The term Putera, literally meaning prince in Malay, is attributed to the RMC's royal status. As of 3 July 2015 (in conjunction with its anniversary), RMC has been authorised to become an IB World School and implement the International Baccalaureate Diploma Program Pro (IBDP).

== Location ==
The RMC campus covers an area of 1,200 acres (4.9 km^{2}) near the town of Sungai Besi (about 10 miles (16 km) from Kuala Lumpur) with a view of the Mines Resort City and the 1998 Commonwealth Games Bukit Jalil Stadium. RMC shares its grounds with the National Defence University of Malaysia.

== Charter ==
The Charter of the Royal Military College states that the Royal Military College was established with the objective of preparing young Malaysians to become Officers in the Malaysian Armed Forces, hold office in the higher divisions of public service and become leaders in the professional, commercial and industrial life of the country.

The motto of the college is "Serve to Lead" or Berkhidmat Memimpin.

== History ==
Prior to 1952, there had been what was called the "Training Depot of the Malay Regiment" in Port Dickson. Here courses were held in signals, tactics and military administration. The Depot also provide educational facilities to bring selected members of the Regiment up to the necessary academic standard for acceptance at the Royal Military Academy, Sandhurst, for higher military training, with a view to qualifying for commissioned rank.

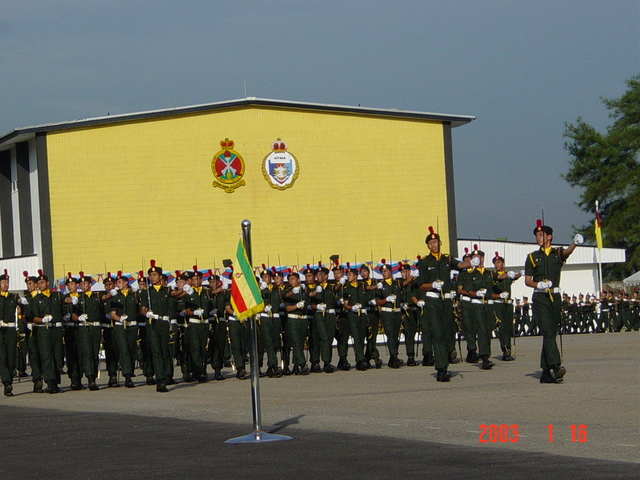
A passing-out parade at the RMC's marching grounds, also known as the parade square. The building in the foreground is the Tun Templer Hall.

On 3 July 1952, Mr. M.E.B. David, the Secretary of Defence, in the Federal Legislative Council Meeting, announced the decision to expand the Malay Regiment Training Depot. The expansion was to result in the formation of The Malay Regiment Training Center, that was to constitute two additional sections: The Pre-Officer Cadet Training Unit (Pre-OCTU) and an inter-racial Boys Company.

The Boys Company was to be part of the Malayan Army, serving the Malay Regiment and the Federation Regiment. The function of the Boys Company was to provide education to sons of serving officers and other ranks in the Malay Regiment, leading to the School Certificate level, coupled with the rudiments of military training.

The first intake of 74 Boys into the Boys Company were recruited in August 1952, from a total of 100 applicants. The ages of the Boys ranged between 14 and 15 years. Their educational qualification, according to a 1952 newspaper bulletin, was to be the equivalent of Standard 4 (English-medium). In addition to these academic requirements those who were shortlisted had to undergo various aptitude tests too.

The task of looking after the academic aspects in the Boys Wing was entrusted to a Director of Studies (DOS) – a civilian Senior Education Officer. He was responsible to the Commandant for carrying out the scholastic policy drawn by the Board of Governors of the college and thus adviser to the Commandant on general educational policies. The DOS had two Senior-Assistants each responsible for the teaching of a group of subjects – called the Head of Science and Mathematics (HOS) and Head of Arts (HOA).

For the purpose of military training, and the co-ordination of domestics military administration required within the Boys Wing, an Officer-in-Charge (O.C.) (later to be known as Chief Instructor - CI) was posted. He was responsible to the Director of Studies (DOS) and thus ultimately to the Commandant.

In September 1954, the Commemoration Foundation Day was celebrated marking the 2nd anniversary of the Boys Company. Present to witness the Commemoration Day Parade were the High Commissioner, Sir Donald MacGillivray, His Highness, the Sultan of Selangor, the Yang di-Pertuan Besar of Negeri Sembilan, the Federation's Prime Minister Tunku Abdul Rahman, Deputy Prime Minister Tun Abdul Razak and a large number of dignitaries.

By September 1957, the Boys Company of the Malay Regiment had become officially part of independent Malaya and had already graduated a number of young boys preparing for service in the Army, the private sector and public service.

=== Independence period ===
In 1958, reports of a proposed $20 million cantonment, covering an area of 1,200 acres (4.9 km^{2}), to be located near Sungai Besi (about 10 miles (16 km) from Kuala Lumpur) began appearing in local press. The entire project, expected to be completed by 1963, was financed by the British Government under the United Kingdom Grants-in-aid Funds. An area of 200 acres (0.81 km^{2}) was allocated for the new Federal Military College, made on the basis of the Boys Company, Royal Malay Regiment.

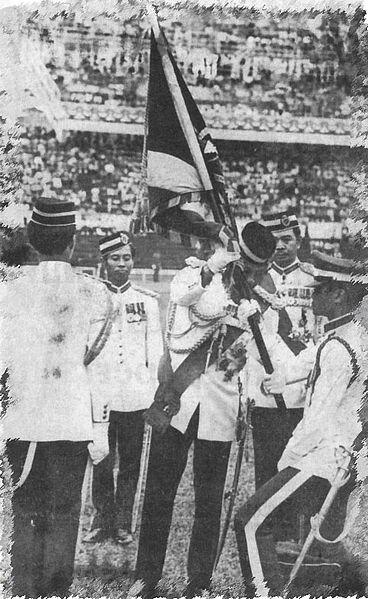
The conferment of the Royal Colours to the college by HM the King of Malaysia, Merdeka Stadium 1981.

The site reserved for the college consisted of scenic surroundings. The new home of the FMC was situated on a hill overlooking a disused mining pool. The college buildings were to be modelled on the lines of some of the best military academies overseas such as West Point in the United States and Royal Military College of Canada. They were to consist of an assembly hall, dormitories, classrooms, a gymnasium, laboratories, some 140 married-quarters for all ranks and civilians employees and a sports complex area with playing grounds and facilities for student athletes.

On 20 June 1961, the then Yang di-Pertuan Agong, Putra of Perlis, as Supreme Commander of the Malayan Armed Forces, officially opened the new complex. In acknowledgement of the immense debt of which the FMC owed the High Commissioner Field Marshal Tun Sir Gerald Templer, the Assembly Hall was named Tun Templer Hall (Dewan Tun Templer).

On 9 December 1966, in a ceremony held at the college, HM Ismail Nasiruddin of Terengganu, the Yang Di-Pertuan Agong, conferred the "Royal" title to the FMC. This was a great honour for the college for no other educational institution in the history of this nation has the "Royal" title bestowed upon it. Hence since 1966, the former Federation Military College came to be known as the Royal Military College of Malaysia.

On 3 June 1981, the Royal Military College was granted King's and Regimental's Colours from His Majesty Seri Paduka Baginda Yang DiPertuan Agong, Tuanku Haji Ahmad Shah Ibni Al-Marhum Sultan Abu Bakar, in a historic Presentation of Colours ceremony at the Merdeka Stadium, Kuala Lumpur. This historic ceremony was also witnessed by Her Majesty the Raja Permaisuri Agong, the Deputy Prime Minister Mahathir Mohamad and Siti Hasmah.

On 20 June 2000, the Old Putra Association (OPA) opened its own building at Subang Jaya, opened by Minister of Transport, Ling Liong Sik.

== College anthem ==
The college anthem is entitled Berkhidmat Memimpin (Serve to Lead) which refers to the college motto. The college song is sung during all assemblies.

Berkhidmat memimpin cogan yang mulia

Maktab Tentera Diraja yang ternama

Putera-putera sentiasa bersama

Menjunjung harapan nusa dan bangsa

Menuntut ilmu tekun usaha

Bersukan ukir daya sejahtera

Berdikari amalan yang terpuja

Memupuk semangat wira waja

== Sports ==
The college has won many awards in various competitions and sports, including rugby and hockey. Its English debating team has won the Prime Minister's Trophy several times, a record also held by Tunku Kurshiah College. The college also organises an annual multi-game competition with Malay College Kuala Kangsar, with the two colleges taking turns to host it.

== Sportsman's Prayer ==
The Sportsman's Prayer is inscribed on a bronze plaque, on a white rock that sits by the rugby field in the college compound.

The Sportsman's Prayer is traditionally recited before a sporting competition by the members of a team. The prayer is as follows:

Oh God, please help me to win for I always want to win. But if in thy inscrutable wisdom Thou willest me not to win, then make me a good loser. For when the one great scorer comes to write against your name, he writes not that you won or lost, but how you played the game.

== Ranks ==
=== Pre-1997 ===
All Companies have four senior rankholders and five junior rankholders.

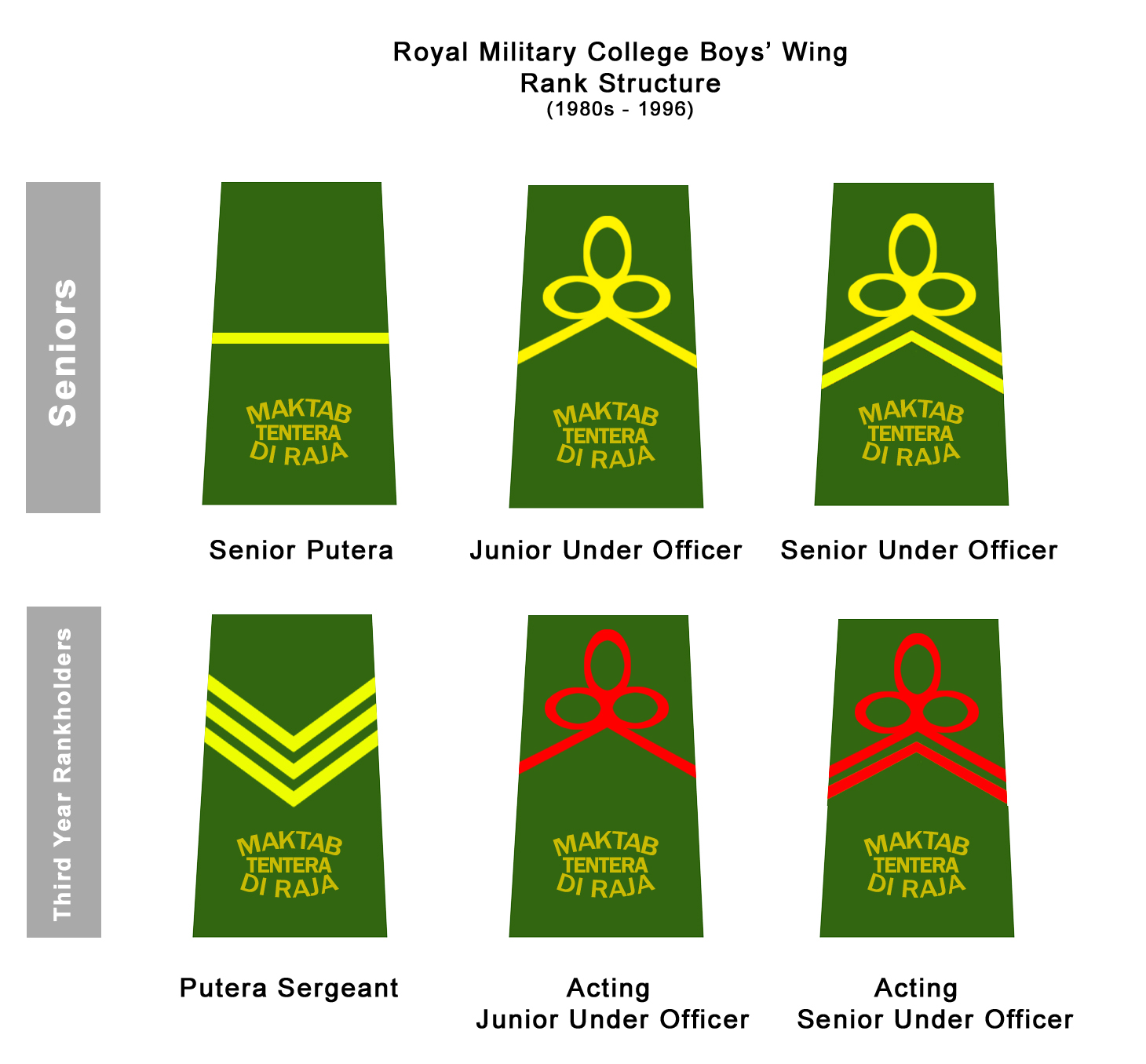
The Royal Military College rank structure from the 1980s until 1996

Every Company is led by one Senior Under Officer (SUO) and assisted by three Junior Under Officers (JUOs), who are fourth year Puteras appointed by the college administration. The terms SUO and JUO are a throwback to the traditions of the Royal Military Academy at Sandhurst, where such titles are still in use today for senior rankholders. Fourth year Puteras who are not rankholders are entitled to be referred to as Senior Puteras (SP).

The SUO is responsible for all aspects of the Puteras under his command, and is the highest ranking Putera in the company. The three JUOs, covering the General, Administration and Quartering billets of the company, are equal in terms of rank and assist the SUO in the running of the company on a day-to-day basis. All Under Officers are entitled to a private bunk each, and SUO's are also entitled to have their meals at the High Table in the Mess Hall. SUO's also carry swagger stick and don Sam Browne belt during official parade (except Passing Out Parade).

SUO's lead their company at all parades and are the main liaisons between the military administration and the Puteras under his care. SUOs and JUOs are also subject to the authority of the company's commissioned officers and instructors, and play a role in the selection of junior rankholders.

Rank is denoted by slip-on shoulder epaulettes and is worn on all uniforms except the Mosque Order (traditional Malay dress) and the Planters' Order (formal blazer and College tie dress). Prior to 1997, these slip-on epaulettes were only worn by the senior and junior rankholders, and its use was accompanied by a metallic shoulder title, bearing the name Maktab Tentera Diraja underneath the rank insignia on the epaulette.

=== 1997-2008 ===
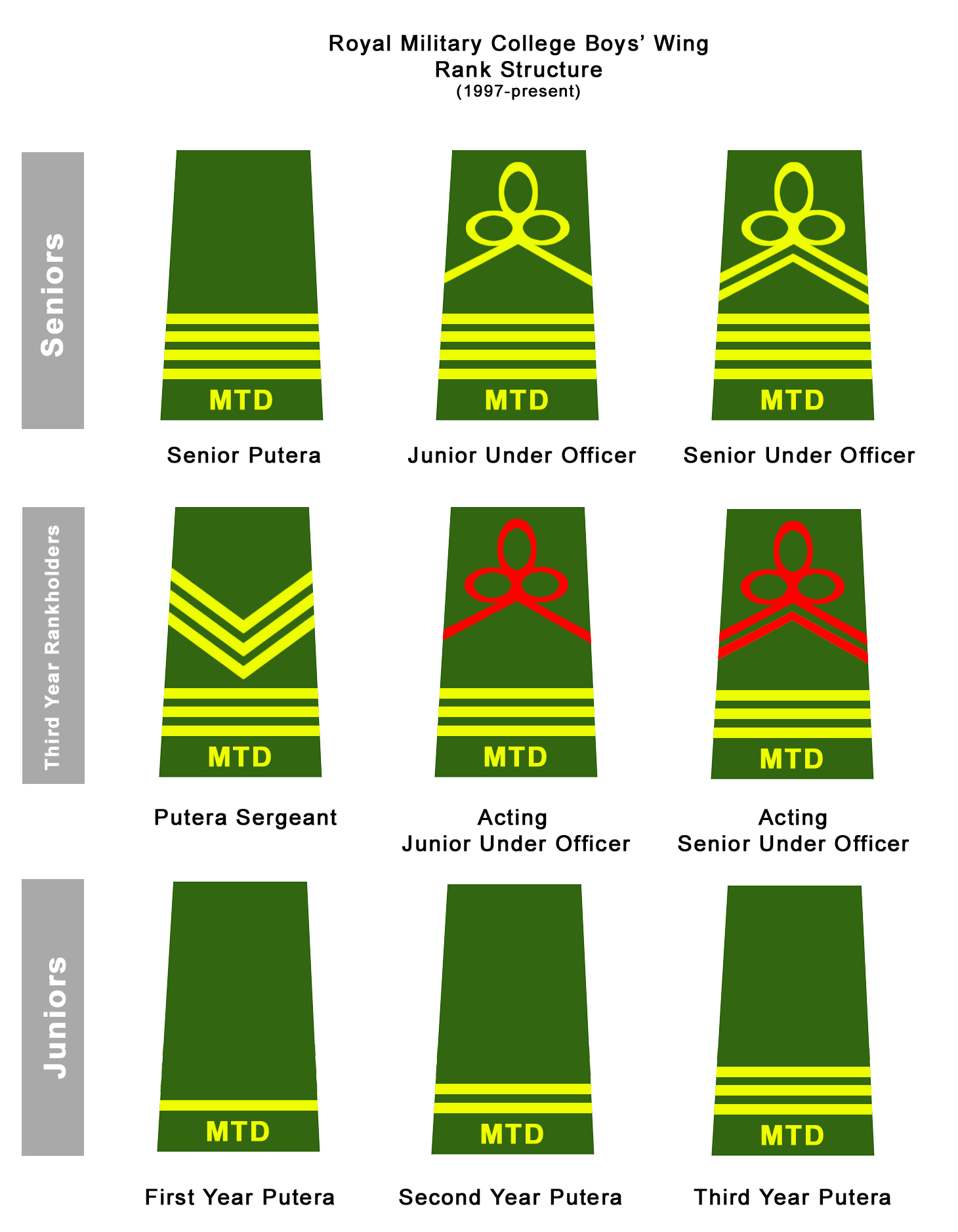
The Royal Military College rank structure from 1997 onwards

In 1997, this rank insignia structure was amended to bring it in line with the Officer Cadet rank insignia in use at the Army College (KTD, Kolej Tentera Darat) and the then-newly established Malaysian Armed Forces Academy (ATMA, Akademi Angkatan Tentera Malaysia). The main difference between an Officer Cadet rank insignia and the Putera rank insignia is the color of the insignia; the bars, knots and chevrons on an Officer Cadet rank are white in color, while the same on a Putera rank is royal yellow in color.

An SUO's rank insignia consists of four horizontal bars (one bar for each year of study at the college) with an Austrian knot and chevron pointing upwards underneath the knot, on a dark green epaulette.

A JUO's rank insignia is identical to the SUO's, except that there is no chevron underneath the Austrian knot.

The letters MTD (acronym of the college's Malay name, Maktab Tentera Diraja) are also emblazoned in royal yellow at the bottom edge of the epaulette for both ranks.

Junior rankholders on the other hand are understudies for the senior rankholder posts and are invested with similar authority with senior rankholders. Nevertheless, all actions of junior rankholders are subject to review by the senior rankholders and the college administration.

Putera Sergeants (P/SGT) are normally appointed from the third year Puteras in the first quarter of the academic year, and they are further promoted to Acting Senior Under Officer (A/SUO) and Acting Junior Under Officer (A/JUO) ranks by the third quarter of the academic year to allow for the gradual takeover of the company from the graduating seniors.

A P/SGT's rank insignia consists of three horizontal bars and three chevrons pointing downwards. An A/SUO's rank insignia consists of three horizontal bars and a bright red Austrian knot and chevron pointing upwards underneath the knot. An A/JUO's rank insignia is identical to the A/SUO's, except that there is no chevron underneath the Austrian knot. The letters MTD (acronym of the college's Malay name, Maktab Tentera Diraja) are in royal yellow at the bottom edge of the epaulette for all three ranks.

P/SGTs, A/SUOs and A/JUOs are not entitled to any privileges accorded to the senior rankholders.

=== 2009–present ===
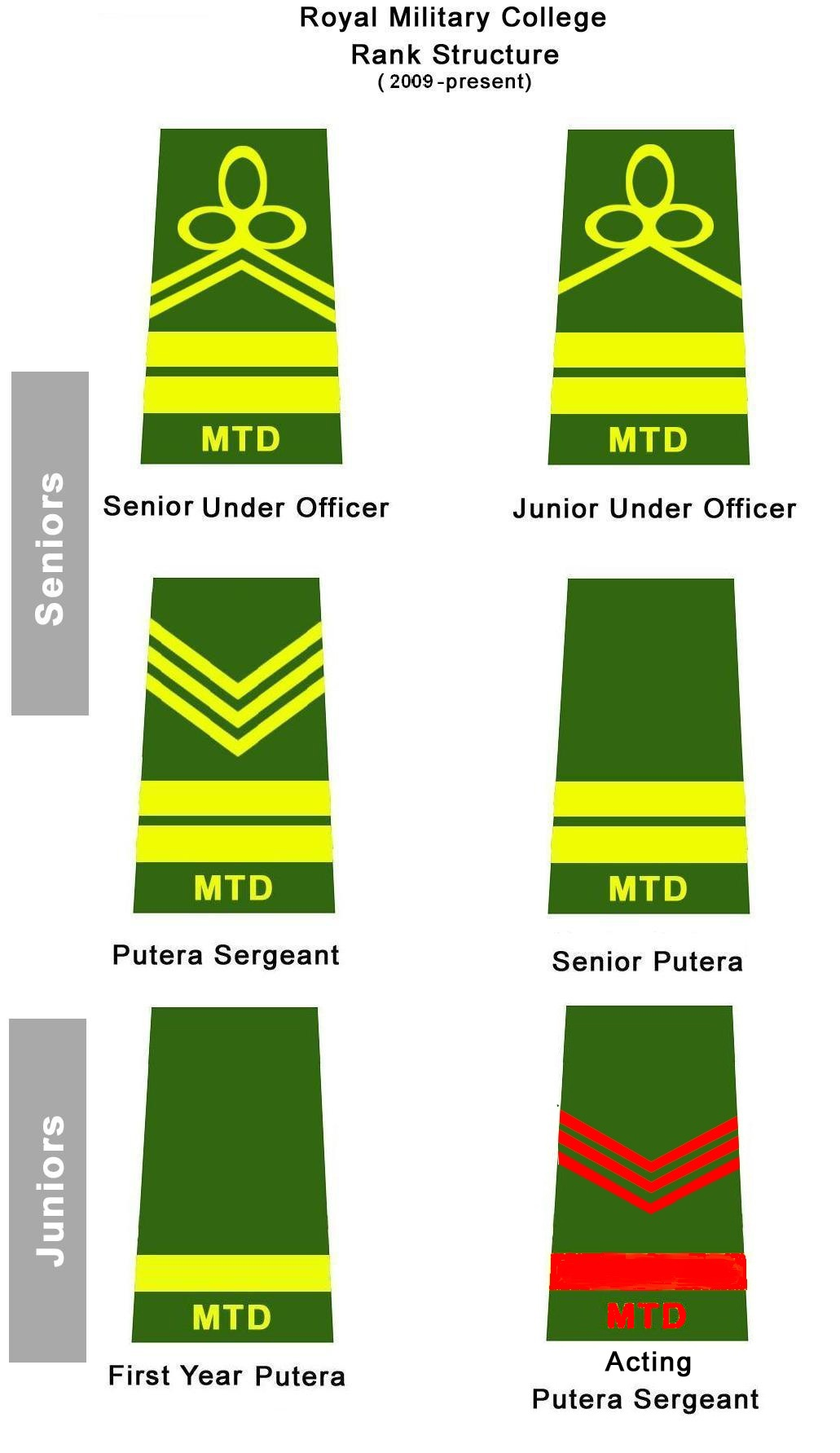
Rank Structure from 2009 - today

As of 2009, new epaulettes were introduced for the Puteras following the changes in first year intakes from Form 2 to Form 4. The first year Puteras (or New boys) initially wears a pair of epaulettes having only one yellow horizontal bar above the MTD acronym. Later on, some of the Puteras who are promoted to A.P/SGT wears a pair of epaulettes consisting one red horizontal bar above the MTD acronym and three red chevrons pointing downwards. The A.P/SGT are the Puteras that will take up the senior ranks of the Company in the following year.

The Puteras who are promoted to SUOs and JUOs will be given the honour of becoming the bearers of the ceremonial sword during their final year's graduation Passing Out Parade, in contrast to those promoted to P/SGTs who bears the standard march rifles along with other graduating Puteras.

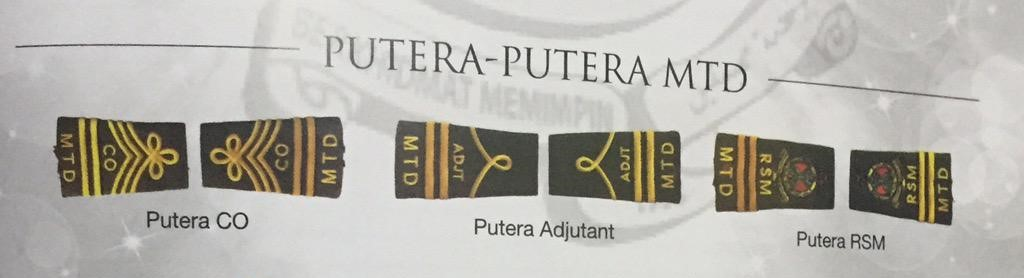
The new ranks which were used between 2014 and 2017. -from The Bugler 2014

As of 2014, two new ranks were formed; Putera Commander (P/CO) and Putera Regimental Sergeant Major (P/RSM). After the selection of rank holders at the beginning of each year, they will be given a 3-month probationary period. In the month of April, one SUO will be promoted to P/CO and one P/SGT will be promoted to P/RSM. These ranks remained until the year 2017 and was eventually phased out.

As of 2020, one SP will be promoted to the rank of President of the Mess Committee (PMC). The newly promoted PMC will bear and wear the JUO rank and epaulette, but with the letters "PMC" stitched underneath the Austrian knot. The PMC has right of veto over the Putera's Mess, and any changes or events must have his approval. Every conduct of the Puteras within the Mess is overseen and supervised by the PMC. Therefore, entitling him the highest seat among the other SUOs at the High Table in the Mess Hall. The inaugural holder of this rank was JUO Haziq Fikri bin Zulkifli (initially SP) from Echo company, class of 2020.

== Traditions and practices ==
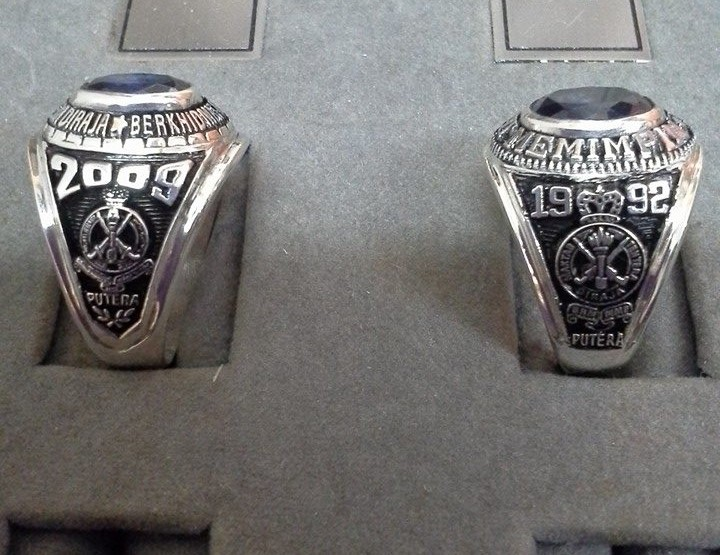
Ring awarded to OPs upon graduation. Each ring is engraved the military number and call sign of their respective owners.

During every Passing Out Parade in which the final year Puteras graduate, the whole battalion will sing "Auld Lang Syne" as the seniors phase out of the Parade Square. The song is synonymous worldwide with farewells and regarded as the closing anthem of the calendar year.

Normally, after their Passing Out Parade, OPs will be awarded their class ring (or also known as OP ring) as a sign that they have graduated from the college and to commemorate their time in the college. The tradition was influenced by the similar tradition practised by Royal Military Academy Sandhurst which was introduced by British administrators during the college's early days. The rings are distributed along with the Putera's basic military training completion certificate.

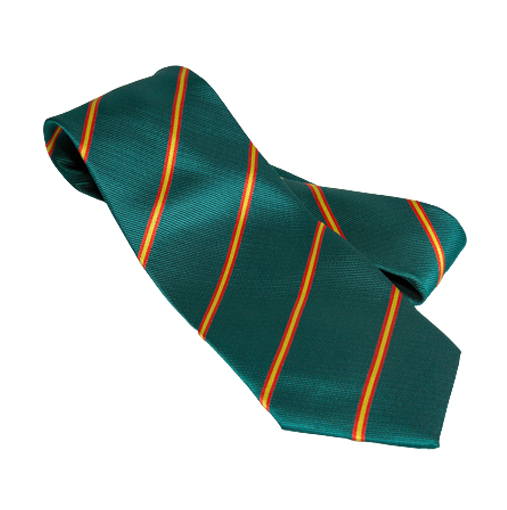
The coveted college green tie, worn by OPs on every Wednesday

Furthermore, OPs wear their college's green tie every Wednesday. This makes it easier for OPs to recognize each other, regardless of generations, race and religion. The green tie is widely regarded as "earned, not bought". Thus, also making it a status symbol for the wearer.

After graduation, OPs from every intake are invited to participate in the OP-PP Games that are held annually and hosted at the past and present RMC grounds. The event is contested by two teams consisting of Old Puteras, against Present Puteras. The games often feature a variety of team sports such as rugby, football and basketball. This event helps bring the alumnus closer together and strengthen the networking within the OPA.

== Notable alumni ==
The alumni association of the RMC is known as the Old Putera Association or OPA.

Some alumni include:

=== Royalty ===
- Tengku Sarafudin Badlishah, current Raja Muda (Crown Prince) of Kedah

=== Military ===
- General (Rtd) Tan Sri Md Hashim Hussein, Chief of the Malaysian Army (1999–2002), Malaysian High Commissioner to Pakistan.
- General (Rtd) Tan Sri Abd Rahman Abd Hamid, Chief of Defence Force (1993–1994).
- General (Rtd) Tan Sri Borhan Ahmad, Chief of Defence Force (1994–1995).
- General (Rtd) Tan Sri Ismail Omar, Chief of Defence Force (1995–1998).
- General (Rtd) Tan Sri Mohd Zahidi Hj Zainuddin, Chief of Defence Force (1999–2005).
- General (Rtd) Tan Sri Abdul Aziz Zainal, Chief of Defence Force (2007–2009).
- Lieutenant General (Rtd) Winston Choo, Chief of Defence Force (Singapore) (1974–1992), Singapore's Non-Resident Ambassador to Israel.
- General (Rtd) Tan Sri Dato' Sri Affendi Buang, Chief of Defence Force
- General Tan Sri Datuk Seri Mohammad Ab Rahman, Chief of Defence Force
- General (Rtd) Tan Sri Dato' Sri Zulkiple Kassim, Chief of the Malaysian Army
- General (Rtd) Tan Sri Dato' Seri Zamrose Mohd Zain, Chief of the Malaysian Army
- General Dato' Muhammad Hafizuddeain Jantan, Chief of the Malaysian Army
- Admiral (Rtd) Tan Sri Mohd Reza Mohd Sany, Chief of Malaysian Navy
- General (Rtd) Tan Sri Datuk Seri Ackbal Abdul Samad, Chief of Malaysian Air Force
- Major General (Rtd) Dato Seri Pahlawan Mohammad Daud, Commander of the Royal Brunei Armed Forces
- Major General (Rtd) Dato Paduka Seri Sulaiman Damit, Commander of the Royal Brunei Armed Forces
- Major General (Rtd) Dato Paduka Seri Husin Ahmad, Commander of the Royal Brunei Armed Forces
- Major General (Rtd) Ibnu Basit Apong, Deputy Minister of Defence Brunei
- Lieutenant Colonel (Rtd) Dato Paduka Ariffin Abdul Wahab, Commander of the Training Institute RBAF
- Lieutenant Colonel (Rtd) Dato Seri Laila Jasa Musa Yakub, Commander of the Training Institute RBAF
- Brigadier General (Rtd) Dato Seri Pahlawan Abdul Razak Abdul Kadir, Deputy Minister of Defence Brunei

=== Politician/Government Servants ===
- Syed Saddiq Syed Abdul Rahman, former Minister for Youth and Sports, Member of Parliament of Muar.
- Mohamad Ariff Md Yusof, former Speaker of the Parliament.
- Mohd Rashid Hasnon, former Member of Parliament of Batu Pahat, former Deputy Speaker of the Parliament and former Deputy Chief Minister 1 of Penang
- Ling Liong Sik, former president of the Malaysian Chinese Association, and former Minister.
- Raja Nong Chik Zainal Abidin, former Minister and former Member of Parliament.
- Annuar Musa, former Minister of Communications and Multimedia and Member of Parliament of Ketereh.
- Mohd Radzi Sheikh Ahmad, former Minister, Member of Parliament and national footballer.
- Mohd Radzi Md Jidin, Member of Parliament for Putrajaya, former Senator, Senior Minister and Minister of Education.
- Md. Alwi Che Ahmad, State Assemblyman for Kok Lanas, Kelantan.
- Dr Idris Ahmad, State Assemblyman for Ijok, Selangor.
- Onn Hafiz Ghazi, Menteri Besar Johor, State Assemblyman for Machap, Johor.
- Mohd Radzi, former Minister of Home.
- Samsudin Osman, civil servant and former Chief Secretary to the Government.
- Abdul Halim Ali, Civil servant and former Chief Secretary to the Government.
- Harrison Hassan , State Assemblyman for Jeram, Selangor.
- Azmizam Zaman Huri, State Assemblyman for Pelabuhan Klang, Selangor.
- Nordin Ahmad Ismail, Member of Parliament for Lumut
- Mohd Sayuthi Bin Bakar, Secretary General of Ministry of Domestic Trade and Cost of Living

=== Corporate Leaders ===
- G. Gnanalingam, businessman and chairman of Westports Malaysia Sdn Bhd
- Mohd Nor bin Yusof - former CEO of Malaysia Airlines
- Ng Keng Hooi - CEO and President of AIA
- Zainal Abidin Abd Rashid, former CEO Income Tax Board
- Munir bin Abd Majid - Economist, Former Executive Chairman, Securities Commission
- Rizal Naizali, former Ceo of Perak FC
- Shahrol Halmi, former Ceo of 1MDB, former president and CEO of Malaysia Petroleum Resources Corporation
- Rafiq Khan Akbar, CEO/MD of ALAM
- Md. Alwi Che Ahmad, Chairman Malaysia Digital Economy Corporation (MDEC)
- Tan Sri Ir. Kunasingam A/L V.Sittampalam, first Malaysian International Fellow of Royal Academy of Engineering UK
- Ahmad Jauhari Yahya, Chairman of Sapura Resources, former CEO of Malaysia Airlines
- Azzat Kamaludin, Chairman of Dialog Axiata, board member of Axiata
- Munir Majid, Chairman of Bank Muamalat Malaysia
- Arul Kanda Kandasamy, former president and CEO of 1Malaysia Development Berhad
- Yusof Basiron, CEO of Malaysia Palm Oil Council, non-executive director of Sime Darby
- Francis Teng Ah Bah, founder of Giant Supermarket
- Abdul Halim Ali, board member of IJM Corporation

=== Ambassador ===
- Wan Aznainizam Yusri Bin Wan Abdul Rashid, Malaysian Ambassador to Ireland
- Mohd Suhaimi Bin Ahmad Tajuddin, Malaysian Ambassador to Turkmenistan
- Zainal Izran Zahari, Malaysian Ambassador to Senegal

=== Sports ===
- Mirnawan Nawawi, former national hockey player, Malaysia Flag Bearer (Olympic Sydney, 2000)
- Shahrudin Mohamed Ali, former Malaysian 100 metres sprint, Malaysia Flag Bearer (Olympic Rome, 1960)
- Khairul Anuar Jailani, former national basketball player and founder of National Community Basketball League and The Putrajaya Basketball Association.
- Mohd Radzi Sheikh Ahmad, former Minister, Member of Parliament and national footballer.

=== Law ===
- Zulkefli Ahmad Makinuddin, former president of the Court of Appeal.
- Abd Wahab Mohamed, High Court judge, former head of prosecutor.
- Muhammad Shafee Abdullah, lawyer

=== Celebrity ===
- AC Mizal, actor, singer, comedian and TV host
- Ashraf Muslim, actor, TV host, producer and medical practitioner

=== Others ===
- Jomo Kwame Sundaram, Economist
- Samuel Ong, cardiologist (Commandant's Prize winner, 1971)
- Ahmad Ammar Ahmad Azam, Islamic activist and recipient of the 1435H/2014 Maulidurrasul Figure Awards
- Abd Manaf Kasmuri, recipient UN Medal
- Ramli Bin Ibrahim, choreographer
- Abdul Rozali-Wathooth, pioneering cardiothoracic surgeon

=== PGB & SP Medal Recipients ===
- Major Zainal Abd Rashid SP, Company Alpha leader of 17th RAMD
- Lt Col (retired) Robert Rizal Abdullah PGB,3rd Royal Ranger Regiment
- Lt Col (retired) Basri Haji Omar, Rejimen Askar Jurutera DiRaja
- Abdul Jalil bin Ibrahim - Only civilian to ever received SP

== Past Commandants ==
- 1953–1955: Lt. Col. J Mahoney OBE MC
- 1956–1958: Lt. Col. P A C Don DSO
- 1959–1961: Lt. Col. R DE L King
- 1962–1964: Lt. Col. JW Pearson
- 1965–1967: Lt. Col. DW Grove DSO
- 1967–1968: Col. Abdul Jamil Bin Ahmad jssc psc
- 1969–1970: Col. Jaafar Bin Dato Onn SMK KMN psc
- 1971–1972: Col. Syed Hamzah Bin Syed Abu Bakar JSD KMN PJK psc
- 1973–1974: Col. Baharuddin Bin Mohd Diah
- 1974–1977: Col. Nik Mahmood Fakharuddin Bin Tan Sri Nik Ahmad Kamil PSK KMN psc
- 1978–1980: Col. Murad Bin Haji Jaafar KMN AMP PIS BE(UM) MEIM Eng jssc psc
- 1981–1983: Col. Mohamad Bin Munip SMK MIprod E AMIAME psc
- 1983–1985: Col. Aboo Samah Bin Aboo Bakar KMN Dip. Pol MBIM AMITD psc
- 1985–1990: Col. Abdul Ghani Bin Yunus PAT AMN MA psc
- 1990–1993: Col. Hussin Bin Haji Yusoff AMT AMK PIS PJK MA psc
- 1993–1995: Col. Haji Yusop Bin Haji Hussin KAT AMN PMC PJK BSoc Sc (Hons) M Ec psc
- 1995–1996: Col. Ramli Bin Haji Nik DNS AMT PMC MA (Lancs) PAT psc te
- Sept 1996–Oct 1996: Col. Khalid Bin Saad AMN PJK MSM (US) mpat psc
- 1996–1999: Col.Ahmad Rodi Bin Zakaria PAT KAT AMN PNBB mpat psc
- 1999–2000: Lt. Col. Ahmad Ghazali Bin Abu Hassan AMN LLM (Lancs) psc
- 2000–2002: Col. Mohd Razif Bin Hj Idris ADK KAT ACM DBS (Mktg) DIM (UKM) mpat psc (Phil)
- 2002–2004: Col. Azizan Bin Md Delin KMN AMK AAP MA (NPS) LL.B (Hons) psc
- 2004–2006: Col Mohd Shukri Bin Ahmad PAT SDK KMN BCK psc 't' MDA (Cranfield) GCGI (London)
- 2006–2007: Kept Syed Shahirudin Putra Bin Syed Osman TLDM PAT PCM KAT KMN PPS PPA MMgt HRM (UNSW) PG Dip EBM (UTM) MMIHRM psc
- 2007–2010: Kept Alias bin Baharuddin TLDM PAT KAT KMN PPS PPA Msc (Mngt) Adv Dip (Mngt)
- 2010–2011: Col Zakaria Yadi PAT SMP KAT KMN PNBB (Somalia) MSc (USNPS) LLM (Malaya) LLB (Hons) UiTM DSDC lmt
- 2011–2012: Col Amirrudin Bin Dato Sulaiman KAT AMN PJM PNBB (Cambodia) MDef Studies (Canberra) MA (UKM) BA (Hons) (UK) mpat psc
- 2012–2016: Col Wan Ghazali Bin Wan Din PAT SDK KAT KMN PPS LLB (hons) (UiTM) LLM (Malaya) MA (UKM) mpat lmt
- 2016–2017: Col Noorrul Azril Bin Ariffin PAT KAT KMN AMK MM (AIM) Manila Msoc Sc Def Studies (UKM) mpat psc
- 2017–2018 : Brig Gen Hj Mohd Shahada Bin Ismail RMAF
- 2018–2020 : Brig Gen Abdul Halim Bin Abu Hassan RMAF
- 2020–2024 : Mejar Gen Mohd Shaifuddin Bin Mohd Shariff RMAF
- 2024−2026 : Mejar Jen Shaiful Azuar Bin Ariffin RMAF
- 2026–present :Brig Jen Abdul Aziz Bin Abdul Rahman RMAF

== See also ==
- Military of Malaysia
- Malaysian Army
- National Defence University of Malaysia
