= Malaysian Service Medal =

- Obverse (left), reverse (right)
- Type: Campaign medal
- Awarded for: Service in Malaysia
- Presented by: Malaysia
- Eligibility: Malaysian and Commonwealth military personnel
- Post-nominals: P.J.M.
- Campaigns: Malayan Emergency; Communist insurgency in Malaysia (1968–89); Indonesia–Malaysia confrontation
- Established: 3 March 2004
- ribbon (bottom) of the medal

Precedence
- Next (higher): Pingat Negara Bangsa-Bangsa Bersatu
- Next (lower): Pingat Pertabalan

The Malaysian Service Medal (Pingat Jasa Malaysia) is a medal given by the King and Government of Malaysia. Established 3 March 2004, the medal recognizes service by members of the Malaysian Armed Forces during the Malayan Emergency, Second Malayan Emergency, and the Indonesia–Malaysia confrontation. The medal was also offered for award to members of the Commonwealth forces from Australia, Fiji, India, Nepal, New Zealand, and the United Kingdom who served in Malaysia during the Malayan Emergency and the Indonesia–Malaysia confrontation. The award is in recognition of "distinguished chivalry, gallantry, sacrifice, or loyalty" in contributing to the freedom of independence of Malaysia. The medal can be conferred and accepted posthumously by next of kin.

== Appearance ==
The obverse of the medal bears the Coat of arms of Malaysia with the inscription JASA MALAYSIA beneath it. The reverse shows a map of Malaysia and the initials P.J.M underneath. The medal is suspended by two crossed palas palm fronds which are attached to a straight suspension bar covered in a decorative pattern.

The ribbon is a 35 mm corded ribbon and has five coloured vertical stripes. The colours are of those of the Malaysian flag. The individual colours and widths of the five vertical stripes are as follows: 4.5 mm yellow, 7 mm blue, 12 mm red, 7 mm blue and 4.5 mm yellow.

No clasps or bars were issued for this medal.

== Criteria ==
=== Malaysian Armed Forces ===
To be eligible for the Pingat Jasa Malaysia members of the Malaysian Armed Forces must have served for six months in any formation or unit of the Malaysian Armed Forces from:

- 1 January 1969 to 2 December 1989 for operations against the Communist Party of Malaya (CPM) or;
- 1 January 1969 to 17 October 1990 for operations against the North Kalimantan Communist Party (PKKU).

Those personnel who did not meet the length of service requirement due to death, injury, or disability from fighting the Communist forces are also eligible for the medal.

=== Commonwealth forces ===
The Pingat Jasa Malaysia may be awarded to Commonwealth forces from Australia, Fiji, India, Nepal, New Zealand, and the United Kingdom including Gurkhas, who served in Malaysia for at least 90 days, between:

- 31 August 1957 and 31 August 1966 or,
- 31 August 1957 and 9 August 1965 in Singapore

As with Malaysian personnel, awards may also be made to those whose service was cut short as a result of death or injury as a result of service in these areas. Those personnel who served in an indirect or support role must have served at least six months during the qualifying periods of service. The start date for the medal is 31 August 1957, the date of Malaysia's independence. The cut-off date for service in Singapore is shorter due to Singapore's independence from the Federation of Malaysia on 9 August 1965.

== Acceptance by Commonwealth countries ==
=== Australia ===
The Australian government accepted the offer of the Pingat Jasa Malaysia. Over 8,000 applications have since been verified by Department of Defence out of about 12,000 former and current serving members believed to be eligible. The Department of Defence, acting as agent on behalf of the Government of Malaysia, receives applications and verifies the service and eligibility to wear the Pingat Jasa Malaysia in accordance with guidelines for foreign awards.

On 30 January 2006, the Malaysian Chief of Defence Force, Admiral Tan Sri Dato' Sri Mohd Anwar bin Hj Mohd Nor presented the initial awards of the medal at Government House, Canberra. Admiral Anwar presented the first medals to the Governor-General, Major General Michael Jeffery, and to group of veterans representing different ranks and Services who served during the Malayan Emergency and the Confrontation. The medal was also presented to the next of kin of two posthumous recipients.

Distribution to remaining eligible recipients will be by the Directorate of Honours and Awards from within the Department of Defence, on behalf of the Malaysian Government.

=== New Zealand ===
Approval for the right of eligible New Zealand personnel who served as part of the New Zealand's military contribution to Malaysia to accept and wear the Pingat Jasa Malaysia without restriction was submitted to Her Majesty Queen Elizabeth II in July 2005. The submission was approved on 7 September 2005. The medal is worn before all foreign awards, but after awards of Commonwealth countries where The Queen is the head of state. Headquarters New Zealand Defence Force acts as the agent for the Government of Malaysia in administering some aspects of the award. More than 3,800 medals have been awarded to eligible individuals with an estimated additional 1,000 eligible individuals who have not applied for the medal. As the Malaysian definition of eligible service is broader than that used by New Zealand, it is estimated that 700 individuals who did not qualify for any New Zealand medals for Malaysian service, are eligible for recognition with the Pingat Jasa Malaysia.

The initial presentations of the Pingat Jasa Malaysia took place at the High Commission of Malaysia in Wellington on 31 March 2006. Tan Sri Dato' Sri Subhan Jasmon, Secretary General of the Malaysian Ministry of Defence presented medals to nineteen veterans who served in the Royal New Zealand Navy, the New Zealand Army, the Royal New Zealand Air Force and the Federation of Malaya Police between 1957 and 1966. Recipients included retired Lieutenant-General Don McIver head of the Royal New Zealand Returned and Services' Association, Leonard Knapp President of the New Zealand Malayan Veterans' Association, and Warrant Officer Reece Golding, RNZN, one of two active serving New Zealand Defence Force personnel eligible for the medal. On 27 June 2006, Defence Minister Phil Goff announced the beginning of general distribution by courier of the Pingat Jasa Malaysia.

=== United Kingdom ===
In 2005, the Malaysian Government approached the Foreign and Commonwealth Office to seek approval to present the Pingat Jasa Malaysia. The British Government, however, announced in the House of Lords that they would refuse the Malaysian medal for British citizens on the basis that the award was contrary to British Medals Policy. The policy states that non-British medals will not be approved for events or service that took place more than five years before initial consideration, or in connection with events that took place in the distant past (e.g., commemorative medals); or if the recipient has received a British award for the same service.

Intensive lobbying then began to try to reverse that decision. After a few months, the Foreign and Commonwealth Office announced that it had submitted a paper to the committee on the Grant of Honours, Decorations and Medals requesting the committee to review their policy in respect of foreign awards and the Pingat Jasa Malaysia. The committee met on 7 December 2005 to carry out the review, but their recommendation was not announced until a written Ministerial Statement was made in the House of Commons on 31 January 2006.

The committee's recommendation was that British citizens could accept the medal but they would not be allowed to wear it. The Ministerial Statement on 31 January 2006 states that the recommendation, which the Queen has approved, stipulates that "Permission to wear the PJM will not, however, formally be given".

The initial presentations of the Pingat Jasa Malaysia took at the Malaysian High Commission in London on 19 July 2006. The medal was presented to 34 ex-servicemen and women by the Malaysian Deputy Prime Minister, Datuk Seri Najib Tun Razak. A second ceremony for another 74 former servicemen who will receive the same medal will be held in Kuala Lumpur, Malaysia.

Throughout 2006, lobbying by veterans resulted in Don Touhig, MP and Former Veterans Minister, beginning the day with an Early day motion on 29 November 2006. "That this House welcomes the decision by Her Majesty The Queen to allow veterans of the Malaysian campaign between 1957 and 1966 to accept the Pinjat Jasa Malaysia (PJM) Medal; is concerned that the Inter-Departmental Committee on the Grant of Honours, Decorations and Medals decided to advise Her Majesty not to grant permission for Malaysian veterans to wear the PJM on public occasions; and calls upon the Government to make representations to the Committee to overturn this decision."

A second Early day motion by Michael Mates, MP was made the next day. "That this House applauds the generous gesture by the King and Government of Malaysia in the award of the Pingat Jasa Malaysia medal to British citizens for service in the Malayan Emergency; notes that Her Majesty The Queen has been graciously pleased to approve the recommendation of the Committee on the Grant of Honours, Decorations and Medals that British citizens may accept the award; is, however, surprised that the Committee did not recommend that British citizens receiving the award should also be able to wear it; is deeply embarrassed that the Australian and New Zealand veterans of the Emergency may both receive and wear the medal; invites the Committee to reconsider the matter, bearing in mind the diminishing number of those who gave valuable service between 31 August 1950 and 12 August 1966; believes that this is a pre-eminent case for an exception to the long-standing Government policy enunciated in the written Ministerial Statement of 31 January 2006; and urges Her Majesty's Ministers to ensure that a further recommendation is made to Her Majesty, but this time one which takes full account of the generosity of a fellow Commonwealth country, the merits of the case, and the deep sense of hurt felt by British veterans, rather than being based upon a slavish observance of precedent."

On 6 November 2011, the Ministry of Defence published a notice announcing that British Veterans would be able to wear the Pingat Jasa Malaysia, for the first time, starting with Remembrance Day events on 11 November 2011. It was explained that historically the acceptance of foreign medals was not permitted if a British medal was awarded for a campaign. The previous restriction of acceptance but not wear had been lifted, and all entitled veterans could both accept and wear the medal.

== Notable recipients ==
- Richard Bomball
- Michael Jeffery
- Garry Johnson
- Rambahadur Limbu
- Tul Bahadur Pun
- Michael Dugdale
- Keith Payne VC
