= Ghazali =

Ghazali (Arabic: غزالي) is an international surname and given name with different spellings (e. g. Gazzalli, Ghazzalli, Kacaly). It may refer to:

- Abu Hamid Muhammad ibn Muhammad al-Tusi al-Ghazali, commonly known as Al-Ghazali (c. 1058–1111), Persian philosopher, theologian, jurist and mystic
- Ahmad Ghazali (c. 1061–1123 or 1126), Persian mystic
- Janbirdi al-Ghazali (died 1521), Ottoman Governor of Damascus
- Kacem El Ghazzali, Moroccan activist
- Lynda Ghazzali, Malaysian porcelain painter
- Mohammed Ghazali, Pakistani cricketer
- Mohammed al-Ghazali (1917–1996), Islamic cleric and scholar
- Nadia Ghazzali, Moroccan-Canadian statistician and university administrator
- Nazem Al-Ghazali (1921–1963), Iraqi singer
- Rustum Ghazali, Syrian politician
- Youcef Ghazali, Algerian footballer
- Zainab al Ghazali (1917–2005), Egyptian activist
- Ghazali bin Marzuki, Singaporean murder victim of the Toa Payoh child murders in 1981
- Muhammad Johan "Jojo" Ghazali, Professional Malaysia Muay Thai.
- Zulfikar Mohd Ghazali, father of Johan Ghazali.
- Muhammad Elias Ghazali, older brother of Johan Ghazali.
- Muhammad Mikail "Miki" Ghazali, younger brother of Johan Ghazali.
- Emylia Lynn "Mia" Ghazali, younger sister of Johan Ghazali.

== See also ==
- Adam Gazzaley, American neuroscientist, author, photographer, entrepreneur and inventor
- Burj al-Ghazali, a fictional skyscraper in Hitman 3
