= Regimental Sergeant Major of the Army (Malaysia) =

Highest enlisted position in the Malaysian Army

- Sarjan Mejar Rejimen Tentera Darat سرجن ميجر ريجيمن تنترا دارت
- Incumbent; Warrant Officer Class 1 Mohamad Fauzi A. Rahman since 5 April 2024
- Malaysian Army
- Style: Encik / Puan / Cik
- Abbreviation: RSM (Army) (English); SMR TD (Malay)
- Reports to: Chief of Army
- Seat: Wisma Kementah, Kuala Lumpur
- Term length: Not fixed
- Formation: 1 January 1982
- First holder: Warrant Officer Class 1 Ahmad Mohd Alim
- Salary: ZA12
- Website: Sarjan Mejar Rejimen Tentera Darat

The Regimental Sergeant Major of the Army (Malay: Sarjan Mejar Rejimen Tentera Darat; abbreviated SMR TD; Jawi: سرجن ميجر ريجيمن تنترا دارت) is the highest appointment attainable within the other ranks of the Malaysian Army. The office holder serves as the principal adviser to the Chief of Army on matters concerning other ranks and acts as their representative within Army Headquarters. The Regimental Sergeant Major of the Army is based at Wisma Kementah, popularly known as Wisma Pertahanan, the administrative centre of the Malaysian Armed Forces.

The appointment is held by a Warrant Officer Class 1 (WO1; Malay: Pegawai Waran 1, abbreviated PW1). Together with the Chief of Army and the Deputy Chief of Army, the Regimental Sergeant Major of the Army also undertakes ceremonial duties, representing the army at state and military events.

The current holder is Warrant Officer Class 1 Mohamad Fauzi A. Rahman, who assumed the appointment on 5 April 2024, succeeding Warrant Officer Class 1 Shahamrie Abdullah, who was promoted to become the Regimental Sergeant Major of the Malaysian Armed Forces.

== History ==
Malaysia, as a Commonwealth country, inherited many military traditions from the British Armed Forces. In the British Army and the Royal Marines, the appointment of Regimental Sergeant Major is reserved for senior enlisted with the rank of Warrant Officer Class 1. The Royal Air Force follows the same tradition, as it was originally part of the British Army before becoming a separate service in 1918.

In Malaysia, prior to 1982, individual corps and regiments of the Malaysian Army each appointed their own regimental sergeant major. These positions were largely honorary, with responsibilities focused primarily on ceremonial duties such as maintaining discipline within their corps or regiment and overseeing parades. On 1 January 1982, inspired by the model of the United States Army's Sergeant Major of the Army, the appointment of the Regimental Sergeant Major of the Army was formally established. This centralised the corps and regimental sergeant majors under a single authority, making the office the representative of all other ranks in the army and the principal adviser to the Chief of Army on matters concerning them.

The first Regimental Sergeant Major of the Army was Warrant Officer Class 1 Ahmad Mohd Alim.

== List of officeholders ==
As of August 2025, ten individuals have been appointed as Regimental Sergeant Major of the Army since the establishment of the position in 1982. The list is as follows:

| No. | Portrait | Regimental Sergeant Major of the Army | Took office | Left office | Time in office |
|---|---|---|---|---|---|
| 1 | Ahmad Mohd Alim | Warrant Officer Class 1 Ahmad Mohd Alim | 1 January 1982 | 10 October 1984 | 2 years, 284 days |
| 2 | Wahab Mat Hassim | Warrant Officer Class 1 Wahab Mat Hassim | 11 October 1984 | 27 April 1988 | 3 years, 200 days |
| 3 | Thazali Mohd Elah | Warrant Officer Class 1 Thazali Mohd Elah | 28 April 1988 | 17 August 1992 | 4 years, 112 days |
| 4 | Mahidin Kasim | Warrant Officer Class 1 Mahidin Kasim | 18 August 1992 | 7 November 2001 | 9 years, 82 days |
| 5 | Mohd Dzahar A. Rahman | Warrant Officer Class 1 Mohd Dzahar A. Rahman | 8 November 2001 | 6 July 2008 | 6 years, 242 days |
| 6 | Musa Haron | Warrant Officer Class 1 Musa Haron | 7 July 2008 | 6 May 2015 | 6 years, 304 days |
| 7 | Hayazi Abdul Aziz | Warrant Officer Class 1 Hayazi Abdul Aziz | 7 May 2015 | 5 October 2019 | 4 years, 152 days |
| 8 | Pauzi Mohd Ali | Warrant Officer Class 1 Pauzi Mohd Ali | 6 October 2019 | 27 October 2023 | 4 years, 22 days |
| 9 | Shahamrie Abdullah | Warrant Officer Class 1 Shahamrie Abdullah | 28 October 2023 | 4 April 2024 | 160 days |
| 10 | Mohamad Fauzi A. Rahman | Warrant Officer Class 1 Mohamad Fauzi A. Rahman | 5 April 2024 | Incumbent | 2 years, 156 days |
