= Sultan Ismail College =

- Maktab Sultan Ismail

Location
- Jalan Telipot; 15150 Kota Bahru; Kelantan; Malaysia
- Coordinates: 6.1069°N 102.2505°E

Information
- Type: Government, cluster
- Established: 5 February 1936; 90 years ago
- Founder: Tengku Mahmood Mahyideen
- School district: Kota Bahru
- Grades: Form 1 - 6
- Gender: Male students (Male and Female students for Lower and Upper Form 6)
- Language: English, Malay
- Colours: Yellow, blue
- Yearbook: The Kijang

Sultan Ismail College (SIC) or Maktab Sultan Ismail is a premier all boys school and the first English Government School in Kelantan. The school is one of Sekolah Kluster Kecemerlangan that is located in Jalan Telipot, Kota Bharu, Kelantan.

== History ==
The school was established on 5 January 1936 by Tengku Mahmood Mahyideen, after a discussion with A.C. Baker and J.A. Harvey at the British Adviser's residence.This discussion led to the formation of the Kelantan Education Committee, specifically tasked with managing the establishment of an English school in Kelantan.

The school, named Ismail English School (IES), after the reigning Sultan of Kelantan at that time which was Sultan Ismail. The school was placed under a separate administration from the Malay Schools, which were managed by the Kelantan Islamic Religious Council. Its objectives were to provide education aligned with the Junior Cambridge Standard, select scholarship recipients, and fill vacancies in the Lower Grade Clerical Service.The school was housed in a building of the Padang Garong Malay School in Jalan Hospital, Kota Bharu. At the end of 1936, the school moved to a new building in Telipot. The school has developed into a secondary school with forms 4, 5, 6 Lower and 6 Upper in the arts, science and commerce streams. The school also equipped with dormitory facilities, teachers' houses, a large hall, science laboratories, canteens on an area of land measuring 20 acres.

Its opening was officiated on 7 April 1955 by Sultan Muhammad IV, the sultan of Kelantan who ruled at that time. In conjunction with its inauguration, the name of this school was changed to Sultan Ismail College (previously known as Ismail English School). In 1955, the school received the first religious teacher in Kelantan. In 1959, the school started accepting Form 6 student intake. In 1965, the school were renamed from its english name to Maktab Sultan Ismail.

== Notable students ==
- Ismail Petra of Kelantan - The 28th sultan of Kelantan
- Muhammad V of Kelantan - The 29th sultan of Kelantan
- Tengku Muhammad Fakhry Petra - The current crown prince of Kelantan
- Tengku Muhammad Fa-iz Petra - The former crown prince of Kelantan
- Tengku Razaleigh Hamzah - Former minister of finance
- Mustapa Mohamed - Former minister of investment, trade and industry
- Zaid Ibrahim - Former minister in the Prime Minister's Department
- Mohamed Yaacob - 16th Menteri Besar of Kelantan
- Borhan Ahmad - The 12th Chief of Defence Forces
- Zain Hashim - The 8th Chief of Army
- Alias Mohamed - politician
- Abdul Aziz Derashid - politician
- Mohd Kamal Hassan - Third rector for International Islamic University Malaysia
- Muhammad Uthman El-Muhammady - Malaysian Islamic scholars
- Ameer Ali Mydin - Founder of Mydin
