= Regimental Sergeant Major of the Malaysian Armed Forces =

Highest enlisted position in the Malaysian Armed Forces

- Sarjan Mejar Rejimen Angkatan Tentera Malaysia سرجن ميجر ريجيمن اڠكتن تنترا مليسيا
- Incumbent; Warrant Officer Class 1 Shahamrie Abdullah since 2 April 2024
- Malaysian Armed Forces
- Style: Encik / Puan / Cik
- Abbreviation: RSM-MAF (English); SMR ATM (Malay)
- Reports to: Chief of Defence Force
- Seat: Wisma Kementah, Kuala Lumpur
- Term length: Not fixed
- Formation: 6 October 2019
- First holder: Warrant Officer Class 1 Hayazi Abdul Aziz
- Salary: ZA12
- Website: www.mafhq.mil.my/index.php/ms/mengenai-kami/peneraju/smr-atm

The Regimental Sergeant Major of the Malaysian Armed Forces (Malay: Sarjan Mejar Rejimen Angkatan Tentera Malaysia; Jawi: سرجن ميجر ريجيمن اڠكتن تنترا مليسيا) is the highest appointment attainable within the other ranks of the Malaysian Armed Forces. The office holder serves as the principal adviser to the Chief of Defence Forces on matters relating to other ranks and acts as their representative within the Armed Forces Headquarters. The appointment is also responsible for overseeing and coordinating the regimental sergeant majors or warrant officers of each service branch.

The office is located at Wisma Kementah, commonly known as Wisma Pertahanan, the administrative centre of the Malaysian Armed Forces.

The appointment is open to all branches of the Armed Forces, and the appointee is selected from among the senior warrant officers of each service, namely the Regimental Sergeant Major of the Army (Malay: Sarjan Mejar Rejimen Tentera Darat), the Warrant Officer of the Navy (Malay: Pegawai Waran Tentera Laut), and the Warrant Officer of the Air Force (Malay: Pegawai Waran Tentera Udara).

The current Regimental Sergeant Major of the Malaysian Armed Forces is Warrant Officer Class 1 Shahamrie Abdullah of the Malaysian Army, who assumed the appointment on 2 April 2024, succeeding Warrant Officer Class 1 Hayazi Abdul Aziz.

== History ==
The position of the Regimental Sergeant Major of the Malaysian Armed Forces was created on 6 October 2019, with Warrant Officer Class 1 Hayazi Abdul Aziz of the Malaysian Army serving as the inaugural holder.

Prior to 2019, no equivalent position existed within the Malaysian Armed Forces Headquarters (MAFHQ). At that time, senior warrant officers of each service branch reported directly to the Chief of Staff of the Malaysian Armed Forces Headquarters (CS MAFHQ; Malay: Ketua Staf Markas Angkatan Tentera Malaysia) on matters concerning other ranks. This arrangement prompted the Armed Forces leadership to establish a dedicated post to act as the principal representative of other ranks within MAFHQ, ensuring their voice and welfare were adequately addressed and safeguarded.

In 2019, two new roles were introduced for other ranks at MAFHQ: the Regimental Sergeant Major of the Malaysian Armed Forces and the Ceremonial Regimental Sergeant Major of the Malaysian Armed Forces (Malay: Sarjan Mejar Rejimen Istiadat Angkatan Tentera Malaysia). The latter serves as the senior authority for ceremonial matters, military parades, and functions as master of ceremony at official events involving the Malaysian Armed Forces.

== Roles ==
The Malaysian Armed Forces Headquarters (MAFHQ) has defined six primary roles for the Regimental Sergeant Major of the Malaysian Armed Forces:

- Serving as adviser to the Chief of Defence Force (CDF) on matters relating to the other ranks of the Malaysian Armed Forces (MAF) and their families.
- Advising the CDF on service policy, career development, and social affairs of the other ranks.
- Acting as the representative of the other ranks in conveying their concerns to the highest levels of leadership within the MAF and the MAFHQ.
- Accompanying the CDF at formal military and state functions and providing feedback on urgent matters requiring immediate action.
- Coordinating and supervising the regimental sergeant majors or warrant officers of each service branch in the management of their respective units.
- Assisting the Chief of Staff of the Malaysian Armed Forces Headquarters in managing human resources for other ranks assigned to the MAFHQ.

In addition to these primary responsibilities, the Regimental Sergeant Major of the Malaysian Armed Forces also acts as chairman of the formal welcoming party for visiting senior enlisted personnel and other ranks from foreign armed forces.

== List of officeholders ==
Since its establishment, two individuals have been appointed to the post of Regimental Sergeant Major of the Malaysian Armed Forces.

| No. | Portrait | Regimental Sergeant Major of the Malaysian Armed Forces | Took office | Left office | Time in office | Defence branch | Previous office |
|---|---|---|---|---|---|---|---|
| 1 | Hayazi Abdul Aziz | Warrant Officer Class 1 Hayazi Abdul Aziz (born 1974) | 6 October 2019 | 1 April 2024 | 4 years, 179 days | Malaysian Army | Regimental Sergeant Major of the Army |
| 2 | Shahamrie Abdullah | Warrant Officer Class 1 Shahamrie Abdullah (born 1983) | 2 April 2024 | Incumbent | 2 years, 159 days | Malaysian Army | Regimental Sergeant Major of the Army |
