= List of ambassadors of Malaysia to France =

Coordinates: 48.869292°N 2.276868°E

Ambassador of Malaysia to France
- Duta Malaysia ke Perancis
- Coat of Arms of Malaysia
- Incumbent; Datuk Eldeen Husaini bin Mohd Hashim since 16 April 2024
- Ministry of Foreign Affairs (Malaysia)
- Style: His Excellency
- Seat: Paris, France
- Appointer: Yang di-Pertuan Agong
- Inaugural holder: Tunku Ismail Tunku Yahya
- Formation: 22 August 1959
- Website: www.kln.gov.my/web/fra_paris/home

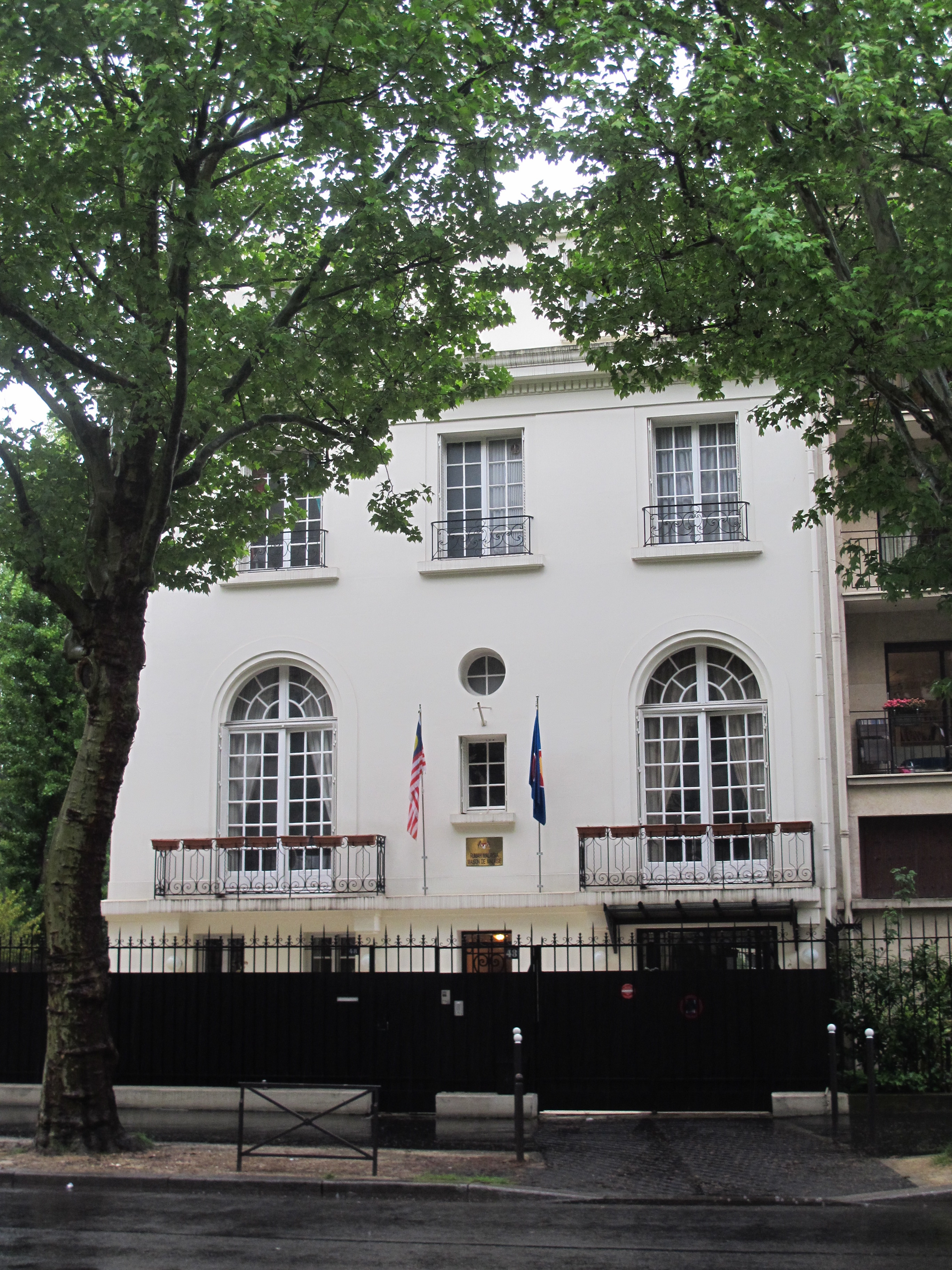
Malaysian Embassy, Paris

The ambassador of Malaysia to the French Republic is the head of Malaysia's diplomatic mission to France. The position has the rank and status of an ambassador extraordinary and plenipotentiary and is based in the Embassy of Malaysia, Paris.

== List of heads of mission ==
=== Ambassador of Malaya to Fifth Republic ===
Ambassador	Term start	Term end
Tunku Ismail Tunku Yahya	22 August 1959	2 December 1965

=== Ambassadors of Malaysia to Fifth Republic ===
Ambassador	Term start	Term end
Tunku Ismail Tunku Yahya	22 August 1959	2 December 1965
Tunku Yaacob Sultan Abdul Hamid Halim Shah	30 December 1965	28 February 1970
Jamal Abdul Latif	29 February 1970	22 August 1977
Raja Aznam Raja Ahmad	4 September 1977	9 July 1979
Abdul Rahman Abdul Jalal	20 February 1980	10 November 1984
Lim Taik Choon	14 December 1984	26 August 1986
Ismail Ambia	16 September 1986	5 August 1990
Hasmy Agam	14 September 1990	15 December 1992
Mahayuddin Abdul Rahman	21 January 1993	28 October 1994
Mohamed Haron	6 December 1994	16 January 1998
Rajmah Hussain	21 April 1998	4 February 2001
Tunku Nazihah Tunku Mohd Rus	6 February 2001	6 May 2004
Hamidah Mohd Yusoff	2 July 2004	8 May 2006
Subramaniam Thanarajasingam	8 September 2006	28 January 2010
Abdul Aziz Zainal	29 May 2010	1 July 2013
Ismail Omar	1 October 2013	1 October 2015
Ibrahim Abdullah	16 February 2016	9 April 2018
Azfar Mohamad Mustafar	18 September 2018	29 May 2021
Dato' Mohd. Zamruni Khalid	1 September 2021	15 March 2024
Datuk Eldeen Husaini bin Mohd Hashim	16 April 2024	Incumbent

== See also ==
- France–Malaysia relations
