= Camp Mindef =

Military base in Kuala Lumpur, Malaysia

- Kem Kementah کيم كمنته
- Part of Kuala Lumpur Garrison
- Kuala Lumpur; Near Kampung Datuk Keramat in Malaysia

Site information
- Type: Military base
- Owner: Ministry of Defence
- Operator: Kuala Lumpur Garrison
- Open to the public: no

Location
- Coordinates: 3°10′40″N 101°43′28″E
- Area: ~172 hectares (1.72 km^{2})

Site history
- Built: 1957
- Built for: Ministry of Defence
- Built by: Malaysian Public Works Department
- In use: 1960–present

Garrison information
- Garrison: Ministry of Defence HQ; Malaysian Armed Forces Command; Malaysian Army Command; Royal Malaysian Navy Command; Royal Malaysian Air Force Command
- Occupants: Minister of Defence; Chief of Defence Forces; Chief of Army; Chief of Navy; Chief of Air Force

Camp Mindef (Malay: Kem Kementah; Jawi: کيم كمنته) is a metonym for the military base that houses the main administrative headquarters of the Ministry of Defence, known as Wisma Pertahanan (lit. 'Defence Complex'). The name "MINDEF" is an abbreviation of Ministry of Defence in English, while "KEMENTAH" is its Malay counterpart, derived from Kementerian Pertahanan.

The base is situated along Jalan Padang Tembak in Kuala Lumpur, within the metropolitan centre of the capital, and forms part of the Kuala Lumpur Garrison, alongside Camp Batu Kentomen.

In addition to serving as the administrative headquarters of the Ministry of Defence, Camp Mindef also functions as a joint-service military base for the Malaysian Armed Forces, encompassing all three service branches: the Malaysian Army, the Royal Malaysian Navy, and the Royal Malaysian Air Force. Owing to the presence of Wisma Pertahanan within the base, Camp Mindef is home to several senior defence leadership offices, including those of the Minister of Defence, the Chief of Defence Forces, the Chief of Army, the Chief of Navy, and the Chief of Air Force.

== History ==
=== Background: Pre-Independence Malaya ===
Prior to the independence of Malaya from British rule in August 1957, the administration of military operations fell under the jurisdiction of the War Office in London, with regional command based at Malaya Command in the Colony of Singapore. In early 1957, as part of preparations for the transfer of military authority to the soon-to-be-independent Malayan government, the headquarters of Malaya Command was relocated to Camp Sungai Besi. This transition included the gradual handover of locally raised units, such as the Royal Malay Regiment, to Malayan control.

=== Independence and the First Camp Mindef at Brockman Road ===
The Ministry of Defence was established on 31 August 1957, coinciding with the nation's independence. The first Defence Minister, Tun Abdul Razak Hussein, set up his office in a colonial-era estate house situated on a hill near Brockman Road (now Jalan Dato' Onn) in Kuala Lumpur. The surrounding area became known as the original Camp Mindef.

During this period, plans were approved to construct a permanent Ministry of Defence complex at Padang Tembak (rifle range), near the Police Training Centre (Pulapol) and to the south of the Hawthornden Estate (present-day Wangsa Maju). The site of the present-day Tugu Negara (National War Memorial) lies in close proximity to the former Camp Mindef at Brockman Road.

=== Relocation to Jalan Padang Tembak ===
Following independence in 1957, the Federation of Malaya began assuming control over British military assets. A parcel of land previously utilised by the British Military Administration as a rifle range—surrounded by forest and low hills—was allocated to the Ministry of Defence as the site for its permanent headquarters. At the time, the area was accessible only from Pulapol via Rifle Range Road, which is today known by its Malay name, Jalan Padang Tembak.

Historically, this area was home to a Malay rice-farming settlement known as Kampong Gonggang (كامڤوڠ ڬوڠڬڠ), established circa the 1870s by Malay settlers of Siak descent. Located southwest of the present-day Camp Mindef, the settlement included cultivated land and a Muslim cemetery, indicating a well-established local community. The earliest recorded reference to the area dates to 1296 AH (1879), when a local noble and his entourage were appointed by the Sultan of Selangor, confirming the settlement's existence for taxation purposes. In 1891, the village and its cemetery were relocated to what is now Ampang, and the original site was renamed Gonggang.

The vacated land was subsequently leased for commercial purposes and developed into a rubber plantation, later transitioning into a tin mining site worked by Chinese immigrants brought in under British administration. In 1940, the Federated Malay States Police relocated its training centre from the Bluff Road Police Station (now Bukit Aman) to a location west of present-day Camp Mindef. The surrounding hilly terrain, especially Bukit Dinding (975 feet (297 m) in elevation), provided a natural barrier, making the area ideal for use as a rifle range.

The site was ultimately selected due to its relatively flat topography, which offered favourable conditions for development compared to the more elevated Brockman Road location. Its proximity to both Camp Wardieburn and Pulapol was also considered advantageous for logistical and operational support.

In March 1960, the first structure—a two-storey stone building—was completed and officially inaugurated by Tun Abdul Razak, then serving as Minister of Defence. The ministry subsequently relocated its operations to the new site. By 1967, a larger complex comprising six four-storey blocks was completed adjacent to the original building, which became the new headquarters of the Malaysian Armed Forces.

Among the early military units stationed at Camp Mindef was the 1st Infantry Brigade of the Malaysian Army, which formed part of the base's original garrison.

=== Relocation of Armed Forces' Branches Headquarters ===
In 1985, a newly constructed 20-storey tower block, named Wisma Kementah (commonly referred to as Wisma Pertahanan), was completed on the site of the original 1960 building. This development enabled the headquarters of the Malaysian Army, the Royal Malaysian Navy, and the Royal Malaysian Air Force to be consolidated within a single location for the first time. Prior to this, the Army Command was based at Camp Imphal, the Navy Command at Lumut Naval Base, and the Air Force Command at RMAF Kuala Lumpur Airbase.

The relocation was part of a broader effort to centralise the senior military leadership of the Malaysian Armed Forces under one facility—mirroring organisational models such as the Pentagon in the United States or the MOD Whitehall in the United Kingdom.

=== Kuala Lumpur Garrison ===
On 18 January 2024, Camp Mindef and Camp Batu Kentomen were formally unified under a single administrative entity known as the Kuala Lumpur Garrison. Camp Batu Kentomen, located in Sentul approximately 6 kilometres (3.7 mi) from Camp Mindef.

The Kuala Lumpur Garrison functions as a base administration command responsible for overseeing infrastructure, maintenance, support services, and facility management for both locations. This includes administrative buildings at Camp Mindef and residential quarters at both Camp Mindef and Camp Batu Kentomen. (Note: Camp Batu Kentonmen is a military base serving multiple functions, including as a training centre, a depot for military transport vehicles, and a residential area for military personnel. The Kuala Lumpur Garrison is responsible solely for managing the residential quarters.)

== Tenants ==
Camp Mindef hosts a wide range of administrative, operational, and support units from across the Ministry of Defence and the Malaysian Armed Forces. Among its key tenants are:

- Camp Mindef
  - Kuala Lumpur Garrison – Base administrative
    - Administration Branch (Cawangan Pengurusan)
    - Residential Quarters Branch (Cawangan Perumahan)
    - Civil Administration Branch (Cawangan Pentadbiran Awam)
    - 104th Company, Royal Military Police (Kompeni ke-104, Kor Polis Tentera Darat)
    - 601st Military Dental Centre (601 Pusat Pergigian Angkatan Tentera)
    - 711th Military Medical Centre (711 Pusat Perubatan Angkatan Tentera)
    - MINDEF Vehicle Fleet (Fleet Kenderaan Kementah)
  - Ministry of Defence
    - Minister of Defence
    - Deputy Minister of Defence
  - Malaysian Armed Forces Council
  - Malaysian Armed Forces Command HQ
    - Chief of Defence Forces
    - Chief of Staff of the Malaysian Armed Forces
  - Malaysian Army Command HQ
    - Chief of Army
    - Deputy Chief of Army
  - Royal Malaysian Navy Command HQ
    - Chief of Navy
    - Deputy Chief of Navy
  - Royal Malaysian Air Force Command HQ
    - Chief of Air Force
    - Deputy Chief of Air Force
  - Malaysian Armed Forces Health Services Division HQ, Royal Medicals (Markas Bahagian Perkhidmatan Kesihatan Angkatan Tentera Malaysia)
  - Defence Engineering Services Division, Royal Army Engineers (Bahagian Perkhidmatan Kejuruteraan Pertahanan)
  - Defence Cyber and Electromagnetic Division, Royal Intelligence (Bahagian Siber dan Elektromagnetik Pertahanan, Kor Risik Diraja)
  - 56th Specialist Signal Regiment (Telecommunications), Territorial Army (56 Rejimen Semboyan Pakar Telekom Askar Wataniah)
  - 515th Regiment, Territorial Army (Rejimen 515 Askar Wataniah)
