= Zain Hashim =

8th Chief of the Malaysian Army (1981–1984)

Yang Berbahagia General (Rtd) Tan Sri Zain Hashim PGAT PSM SPMJ SPSK SIMP PNBS DCSM DPMS DSAP DSMT PGDK JSM SMJ SMT PPB PJK PKB PPA PPM PNBB PJM PM
- زين هاشم
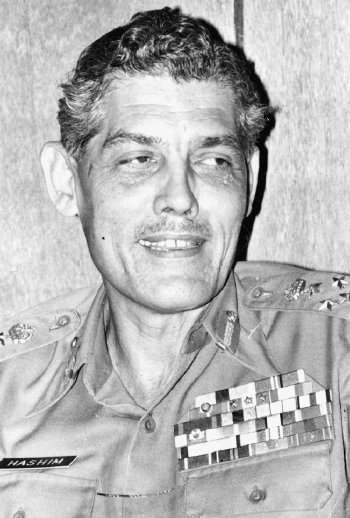
- Zain's portrait, c. 1980s

8th Chief of Army
- In office 20 January 1981 – 16 January 1984
- Monarch: Ahmad Shah
- Prime Minister: Hussein Onn (1981); Mahathir Mohamad (1981–1984)
- Minister of Defence: Hussein Onn (1981); Mahathir Mohamad (1981–1984)
- Preceded by: Mohd Ghazali Mohd Seth
- Succeeded by: Mohd Ghazali Che Mat

Personal details
- Born: Zain Abdul Rashid bin Mahmud Hashim; 1 August 1930 Hampstead, London, England
- Died: 30 June 2011 (aged 80) Selayang Hospital, Selangor, Malaysia
- Spouses: Che Zaharah Alias (m. 1961; div. 1995); Salifah Mohd Esa (m. 1995)
- Children: 3

Military service
- Allegiance: British Malaya; Malaysia
- Branch/service: British Colonial Auxiliary Forces; Malaysian Army
- Years of service: 1949–1984
- Rank: General
- Unit: Malay Regiment; Royal Armoured Corps
- Battles/wars: Malayan Emergency; Indonesia–Malaysia confrontation; Second Malayan Emergency

Zain bin Hashim (Note: Jawi: زين بن هاشم; In some newsletters, he known as Zain bin Mahmud Hashim or Zain Abdul Rashid bin Mahmud Hashim) (1 August 1930 – 30 June 2011), was a Malaysian military officer who served as the 8th chief of the Malaysian Army from January 1981 to January 1984.

== Early life and education ==
Zain was born on 1 August 1930 in Hampstead, London, and moved to Kelantan when he was one year old.

He attended secondary education at Ismail English School, Kota Bharu and graduated in 1948. He also attended course at the Harvard Business School in 1984.

== Military career ==
=== Early military career ===
Zain joined the military in 1949 as a recruit for the Malay Regiment; in 1950 he was selected to attend a two-year Officer Cadet Course at the Royal Military Academy, Sandhurst. After he completed the course, he was commissioned as a second lieutenant and posted as a company officer at the Federation Armoured Car Regiment. In 1958, he attended the course at the Staff College, Camberley.

After graduating from the course in 1960, he posted as brigade major of 3rd Infantry Brigade. During the time in which he held that post, he served with his brigade under the Malayan Special Forces for United Nations Operation in the Congo (UNOC).

When his assignment was completed in 1961, he posted as commanding officer of the 2nd Battalion, Federation Reconnaissance Corps and was promoted to lieutenant colonel. He held that position until 1963, when he was transferred at the Ministry of Defence to serve as a Principal Staff Officer in the Personnel Division.

In early August 1967, he was promoted to colonel and appointed commander of the Kuala Lumpur Garrison.

=== Rise to flag rank ===
In October 1968, he was promoted to brigadier general and appointed as chief of personnel staff at the Ministry of Defence. He held the position until he was transferred and appointed the commander of the 3rd Infantry Brigade in Kuching a year later.

In 1971, he attend the course at the Imperial Defence College, London. After completing a course in late 1972, he was appointed as commander of the 7th Infantry Brigade.

In early 1977, he was appointed as Chief of Logistic Staff before he was appointed as the 4th Deputy Chief of Army in the following year.

He was promoted to lieutenant general in early October 1980.

=== Chief of Army ===
Zain was appointed as the 8th Chief of Army on 20 January 1981, following his predecessor, Mohd Ghazali Mohd Seth, the 7th Chief of Defense Forces. He held the post until 16 January 1984, when he was succeeded by Mohd Ghazali Che Mat.

== Personal life ==
=== Family ===
Zain was married Che Zaharah binti Alias in 1961 and had one daughter and one son with her. Zain and Zaharah officially divorced in 1995. That same year, he married Salifah binti Mohd Esa, and later had one son with her.

=== Death ===
Zain was pronounced dead at 3:50 PM on 30 June 2011 at Selayang Hospital, Selangor, with the cause of death being old age. That night, he was buried at Section 9 Muslim Cemetery, Kota Damansara.

== Honours ==
=== Honours of Malaysia ===
- Malaysia
  - Commander of the Order of Loyalty to the Crown of Malaysia (PSM) – Tan Sri (1981)
  - Companion of the Order of Loyalty to the Crown of Malaysia (JSM) (1969)
  - Recipient of the Active Service Medal (PKB)
  - Recipient of the General Service Medal (PPA)
  - Recipient of the Malaysian Commemorative Medal (Silver) (PPM (P))
  - Recipient of the United Nations Missions Service Medal (PNBB) with "CONGO" clasp (1995)
- Malaysian Armed Forces
  - Courageous Commander of the Order of Military Service (PGAT) (1983)
  - Recipient of the Malaysian Service Medal (PJM)
- Johor
  - Knight Grand Commander of the Order of the Crown of Johor (SPMJ) – Dato'
  - Companion of the Order of the Crown of Johor (SMJ) (1972)
- Kelantan
  - Knight Grand Commander of the Order of Loyalty to the Crown of Kelantan (SPSK) – Dato' (1981)
  - Recipient of Sultan Ismail Petra Coronation Medal
- Malacca
  - Knight Commander of the Exalted Order of Malacca (DCSM) – Datuk Wira (1983)
- Negeri Sembilan
  - Recipient of the Meritorious Service Medal (PJK) (1968)
- Pahang
  - Knight Grand Companion of the Order of the Crown of Pahang (SIMP) – formerly Dato', now Dato' Indera
  - Knight Companion of the Order of Sultan Ahmad Shah of Pahang (DSAP) – Dato'
  - Recipient of the Sultan Ahmad Shah Installation Medal
- Sabah
  - Commander of the Order of Kinabalu (PGDK) – Datuk
- Sarawak
  - Knight Commander of the Most Exalted Order of the Star of Sarawak (PNBS) – formerly Dato', now Dato Sri
  - Recipient of the Meritorious Service Medal (PPB)
- Selangor
  - Knight Commander of the Order of the Crown of Selangor (DPMS) – Dato' (1982)
- Terengganu
  - Knight Companion of the Order of Sultan Mahmud I of Terengganu (DSMT) – Dato' (1982)
  - Companion of the Order of the Crown of Terengganu (SMT) (1965)
  - Recipient of the Sultan Ismail Nasiruddin Shah Silver Jubilee Medal
  - Recipient of the Sultan Mahmud Al-Muktafi Billah Shah Coronation Medal

=== Foreign honours ===
- Thailand
  - Knight Grand Cross of the Order of the Crown of Thailand (PM) (1983)
- United Kingdom
  - Recipient of the General Service Medal with "MALAYA" clasp
  - Recipient of the Queen Elizabeth II Coronation Medal
- United Nations
  - Recipient of the ONUC Medal
