= Mohd Ghazali Mohd Seth =

7th Chief of the Malaysian Defence Forces (1929–2021)

Yang Berbahagia General (Rtd) Tan Sri Mohd Ghazali Mohd Seth PGAT PMN PSM SPMJ SIMP DHMS DA PNBS JMN PPC
- محمد غزالي محمد شيث

7th Chief of Defence Forces
- In office 20 January 1981 – 31 October 1985
- Monarchs: Ahmad Shah; Iskandar
- Prime Minister: Mahathir Mohamad
- Minister of Defence: Mahathir Mohamad
- Preceded by: Mohd Sany Abdul Ghaffar
- Succeeded by: Mohd Ghazali Che Mat

7th Chief of Army
- In office 1 December 1977 – 19 January 1981
- Preceded by: Mohd Sany Abdul Ghaffar
- Succeeded by: Zain Hashim

Personal details
- Born: 4 February 1929 Johor Bahru, Johor, Unfederated Malay States, British Malaya (now Malaysia)
- Died: 24 August 2021 (aged 92) Kuala Lumpur, Malaysia
- Resting place: Bukit Kiara Muslim Cemetery, Kuala Lumpur
- Spouse: Norziah Onn (died 2023)
- Children: 5 (1 deceased)
- Relatives: Onn Jaafar (father-in-law); Hussein Onn (brother-in-law); Ismail Abdul Rahman (brother-in-law); Hishammuddin Hussein (nephew); Yahya Awang (nephew-in-law); Onn Hafiz Ghazi (grandnephew)
- Profession: Senior military officer
- Nickname: Gary

Military service
- Allegiance: Malaysia
- Branch/service: Malaysian Army
- Years of service: 1954–1985
- Rank: General
- Commands: Chief of Army (1977–82); Chief of Defence Forces (1982–85)

Mohd Ghazali bin Mohd Seth (4 February 1929 – 24 August 2021) was the 7th Chief of Defence Forces of Malaysia.

== Background ==
Ghazali was born on 4 February 1929 in Johor Bahru, Johore. He attended secondary school at the prestigious English College (Maktab Sultan Abu Bakar), Johor Bahru in 1946 and received military training at the Royal Military Academy Sandhurst in 1952. He served as Army chief (1977–1982) prior to his appointment as the 7th Chief of the Malaysian Defence Forces (1982–1985).

== Death ==
Ghazali died on 24 August 2021 at the Cardiac Vascular Sentral (CVSKL) private hospital due to pneumonia whilst receiving treatment for cancer. He and was buried at the Bukit Kiara Muslim Cemetery in Kuala Lumpur.

== Honours ==
=== Honours of Malaysia ===
- Malaysia
  - Recipient of the Malaysian Commemorative Medal (Silver) (PPM) (1965)
  - Officer of the Order of the Defender of the Realm (KMN) (1968)
  - Companion of the Order of the Defender of the Realm (JMN) (1971)
  - Commander of the Order of Loyalty to the Crown of Malaysia (PSM) – Tan Sri (1978)
  - Commander of the Order of the Defender of the Realm (PMN) – Tan Sri (1981)
- Malaysian Armed Forces
  - Courageous Commander of the Gallant Order of Military Service (PGAT)
- Johor
  - Companion of the Order of the Crown of Johor (SMJ)
  - Knight Commander of the Order of the Crown of Johor (DPMJ) – Dato'
  - Knight Grand Commander of the Order of the Crown of Johor (SPMJ) – Dato'
- Pahang
  - Grand Knight of the Order of the Crown of Pahang (SIMP) – formerly Dato', now Dato' Indera (1981)
- Kedah
  - Knight Commander of the Order of Loyalty to Sultan Abdul Halim Mu'adzam Shah (DHMS) – Dato' Paduka (1983)
- Sarawak
  - Distinguished Service Medal (Gold) (PPC)
  - Knight Commander of the Order of the Star of Sarawak (PNBS) – formerly Dato, now Dato Sri
  - Knight Commander of the Order of the Star of Hornbill Sarawak (DA) – Datuk Amar (2012)

=== Foreign Honours ===
- Indonesia
  - Honorary Recipient of the Bintang Dharma (BD) (1969)
  - Honorary Recipient of the Bintang Yudha Dharma Utama (BYD) (1983)
