= Johan Ghazali =

Malaysian Muay Thai fighter (born 2006)

Johan Ghazali ABS
- Born: Muhammad Johan Ghazali bin Zulfikar; November 14, 2006 (age 19); Kuala Lumpur, Malaysia
- Nickname: Jojo Ghazali
- Height: 170 cm (5 ft 7 in)
- Division: Flyweight (135 lbs) (ONE)
- Reach: 165 cm (65 in)
- Style: Muay Thai
- Team: Rentap Muaythai Gym (2016–present)
- Years active: c. 2016–present

Kickboxing record
- Total: 10
- Wins: 7
- By knockout: 6
- Losses: 3
- Draws: 0

Other information
- Notable relatives: General Tan Sri Mohd Ghazali Che Mat (grandfather); SAC Zulfikar Mohd Ghazali (father); Jennana Lynn Johnson (mother); Muhammad Elias Ghazali (oldest brother); Muhammad Mikael "Miki" Ghazali (younger brother); Emylia Lynn "Mia" Ghazali (younger sister)

Muhammad Johan Ghazali bin Zulfikar (born 14 November 2006), known professionally as Jojo Ghazali is a Malaysian professional Muay Thai fighter and kickboxer.

== Personal life ==
Jojo was born on 14 November 2006 in Kuala Lumpur. In 2015, he moved to Kuching, Sarawak. He is the second of four siblings. Jojo is the son of SAC Zulfikar Ghazali, a high-ranking officer in the Royal Malaysia Police and grandson of the late General Mohd Ghazali Che Mat who served as 8th Chief of the Defence Forces. He is of American descent through his mother.

He received his early education at Sekolah Menengah Kebangsaan St. Thomas, Kuching, Sarawak. Jojo began actively participating in Muay Thai at the age of 10, inspired by his parents, who are both practitioners of Muay Thai. Notably, all of his siblings are also Muay Thai practitioners and representing Malaysia in various international tournaments.

On 11 October 2025, Jojo was conferred the Member of the Most Exalted Order of the Star of Sarawak (A.B.S.) by Governor of Sarawak, Wan Junaidi Tuanku Jaafar for his outstanding achievements and contribution to the sport.

== Career ==
In 2022, Jojo achieved a remarkable feat by winning the 14–15 age category (under 60 kg) title at the 2022 IFMA World Youth Muay Thai Championship. In the final, held at the Sunway Pyramid in Petaling Jaya on a Saturday, he defeated Russian competitor Rustam Yunusob with an overall score of 20–18. In September, Jojo competed in the men’s 60 kg category at the 2022 Sukma Games against Wan Muhd Sabri Wan Zuki of Melaka, dominating the opening round. In the second round, Johan secured victory with a knockout, ending the match with a score of 10–9 in his favour and leading him to gold medal.

ONE Championship

Jojo made his promotional debut in ONE Championship in early of February 2023, defeating Padesuk Fairtex by knockout in just 16 seconds to securing his first victory in the ONE Championship. Jojo also bagged RM 46,000 for performance bonus.

On 26 May 2023, Jojo competed against Thai kickboxing star Tai Sor Jor Piek Uthai at ONE Friday Fights 18, securing victory with a spectacular knockout. The win repeated the success of his debut match. In addition Jojo secured a contract valued $100,000 with ONE Championship and returned home with RM 46,000 for his second knockout in a row.

On December 9, 2023, he extended his ONE Championship career record to 5-0, after defeating Edgar Tarbares in just 36 seconds. Jojo was unable to retain the entirety of his prize money after failing to make the required weight. As a result, he was obliged to forfeit 50 percent of his purse to his opponent.

== Honour ==
- Sarawak
  - Member of the Most Exalted Order of the Star of Sarawak (ABS) (2026)
