= Abdul Aziz Zainal =

Malaysian diplomat (born 1951)

Yang Berbahagia General (Rtd) Tan Sri Dato' Seri Abdul Aziz Zainal PGAT PMN SPTJ SPKK SPTS SPMP SSDK SSAP SIMP PSM PSAT DPKT DUBC DHMS DGMK DSAP DIMP JMN PAT KAT AMN PPS PPA PNBB PJM PM
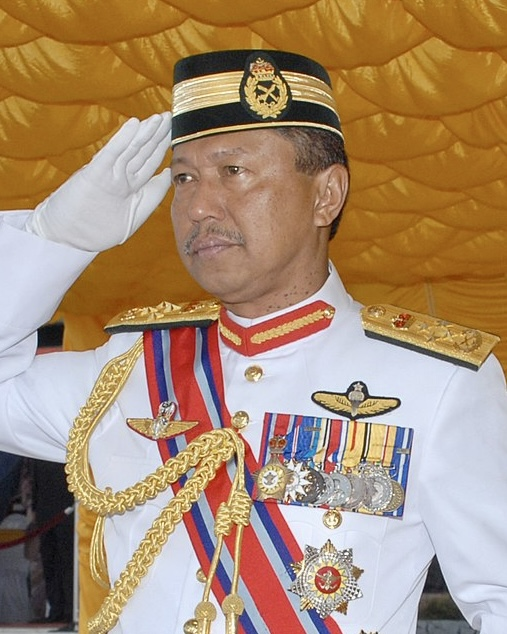
- General Abdul Aziz in 2007

15th Ambassador of Malaysia to France
- In office 29 May 2010 – 1 July 2013
- Monarchs: Mizan Zainal Abidin; Abdul Halim
- Prime Minister: Najib Razak
- Preceded by: S. Thanarajasingam
- Succeeded by: Ismail Omar

16th Chief of Defence Forces
- In office 1 February 2007 – 31 August 2009
- Monarch: Mizan Zainal Abidin
- Prime Minister: Abdullah Ahmad Badawi; Najib Razak
- Preceded by: Anwar Mohd Nor
- Succeeded by: Azizan Ariffin

12th Chief of Army
- In office 9 September 2004 – 31 January 2007
- Monarchs: Sirajuddin; Mizan Zainal Abidin
- Prime Minister: Abdullah Ahmad Badawi
- Preceded by: Mohd Azumi Mohamed
- Succeeded by: Muhammad Ismail Jamaluddin

Personal details
- Born: Abdul Aziz; 26 August 1951 (age 75) Kuala Pilah, Negeri Sembilan, Federation of Malaya (now Malaysia)
- Spouse: Rositah Md. Mawi
- Children: 4
- Education: Royal Military College; Asian Management Institute
- Occupation: Diplomat

Military service
- Allegiance: Malaysia
- Branch/service: Malaysian Army
- Years of service: 1969–2009
- Rank: General
- Commands: 3rd Battalion, Royal Malay Regiment; 3rd Infantry Division; Chief of Army; Malaysian Armed Forces Headquarters

Abdul Aziz bin Zainal (born 26 August 1951) is a Malaysian diplomat who formerly took office as the 16th Chief of Defence Forces from 2007 to 2009, 12th Chief of Army from 2004 to 2007, and Ambassador of Malaysia to France from 2010 to 2013. Notably, he served as Bank Kerjasama Rakyat Malaysia's previous chairman, chairman of Heitech Defence System and Perbadanan Perwira Niaga.

== Biography ==
=== Education ===
Aziz has an honorary doctorate in leadership and management from the University of Tun Abdul Razak in 2007; honorary doctorate in management from the Malaysian University of Sabah in 2008; and a master's degree in management from the Asian Institute of Management, Manila in 1996. Furthermore, he participated in courses and seminars abroad, including the Peace Support Operations training in Victoria, British Columbia, the Battle Shooting Management course in the United Kingdom, and the Pacific Armies Management seminars in Sydney, Tokyo, and Calgary. Later in his career, he would go on to attend the Malaysian Armed Forces (MAF) Staff College and MAF Defence College.

=== Military career ===
After attending the Royal Military College in Sungai Besi, Aziz enlisted in the Royal Malay Regiment (RMR) in 1971. As he advanced through the ranks of the military, he began his brief tenure as a platoon commander in the 3rd Battalion. He had held numerous important staff and command positions in different Malaysian Armed Forces headquarters, departments, and training facilities in addition to serving in multiple roles in RMR battalions. As Chief of Defence Forces, he brought about a new management philosophy that transformed the organisation and led to the introduction of the balanced scorecard, key performance indicators, and the "Fourth Dimension MAF," as well as full integration and improved interoperability between the Army, Navy, and Armed Forces.

Along with serving as the Malaysian contingent commander in Bosnia and Herzegovina from 1996 to 1997 as a member of NATO forces, Aziz held the position of assistant defense attaché in the Philippines from 1981 to 1983. He assumed ultimate command of the Malaysian Army upon his promotion to general on 9 September 2004, and would hold that position until 2007, and later the Chief of Defence Forces from February 2007 to September 2009.

=== Later life ===
On 29 May 2010, Abdul Aziz was welcomed as Malaysia's ambassador to France. He became the first former Chief of Defence Forces to be named ambassador, becomes one of a select few non-career diplomats to hold this position of responsibility. In 2016, he was arrested and questioned on a RM15 million cas, making him the second high-ranking bank employee to be brought before the Malaysian Anti-Corruption Commission (MACC).

== Personal life ==
Aziz was born in Kuala Pilah, Negeri Sembilan on 26 August 1951. He is married to Puan Sri Dato' Rositah binti Haji Md. Mawi and together had two sons and daughters.

== Honours ==
Aziz holds accreditations in Portugal and Monaco, in addition to earning the following honours;

=== Honours of Malaysia ===
- Malaysia
  - Commander of the Order of the Defender of the Realm (PMN) – Tan Sri (2007)
  - Commander of the Order of Loyalty to the Crown of Malaysia (PSM) – Tan Sri (2006)
  - Companion of the Order of the Defender of the Realm (JMN) (2002)
  - Member of the Order of the Defender of the Realm (AMN) (1978)
  - Recipient of the Loyal Service Medal (PPS)
  - Recipient of the General Service Medal (PPA)
  - Recipient of the United Nations Missions Service Medal (PNBB) with "BOSNIA" clasp (1997)
  - Recipient of the 10th Yang di-Pertuan Agong Installation Medal
  - Recipient of the 11th Yang di-Pertuan Agong Installation Medal
  - Recipient of the 12th Yang di-Pertuan Agong Installation Medal
  - Recipient of the 13th Yang di-Pertuan Agong Installation Medal
- Malaysian Armed Forces
  - Courageous Commander of the Most Gallant Order of Military Service (PGAT)
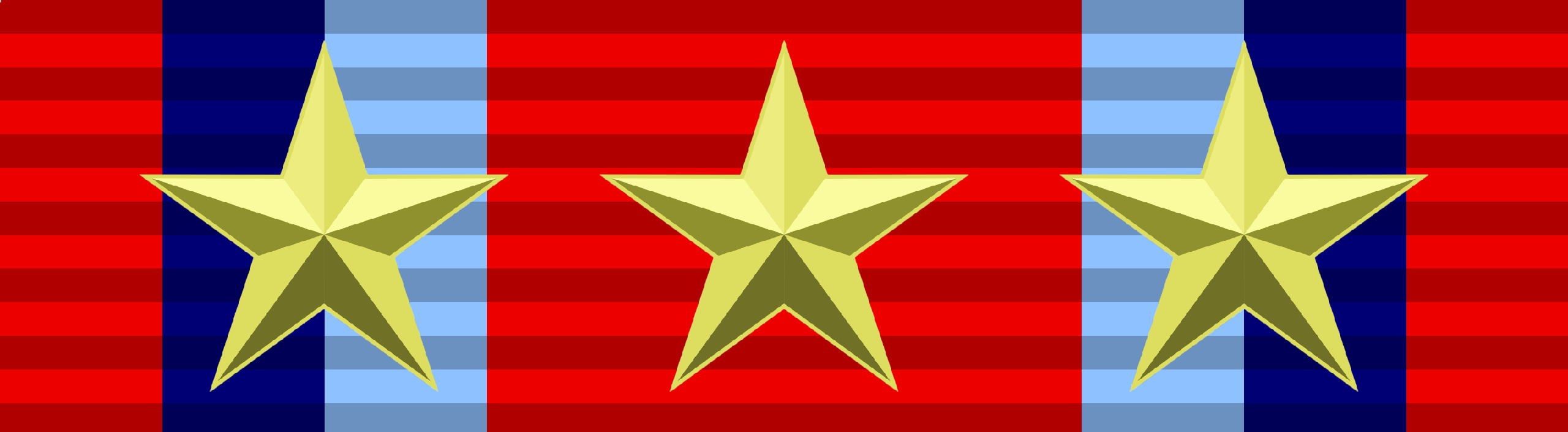
  - Loyal Commander of the Most Gallant Order of Military Service (PSAT) (2002)
  - Warrior of the Most Gallant Order of Military Service (PAT)
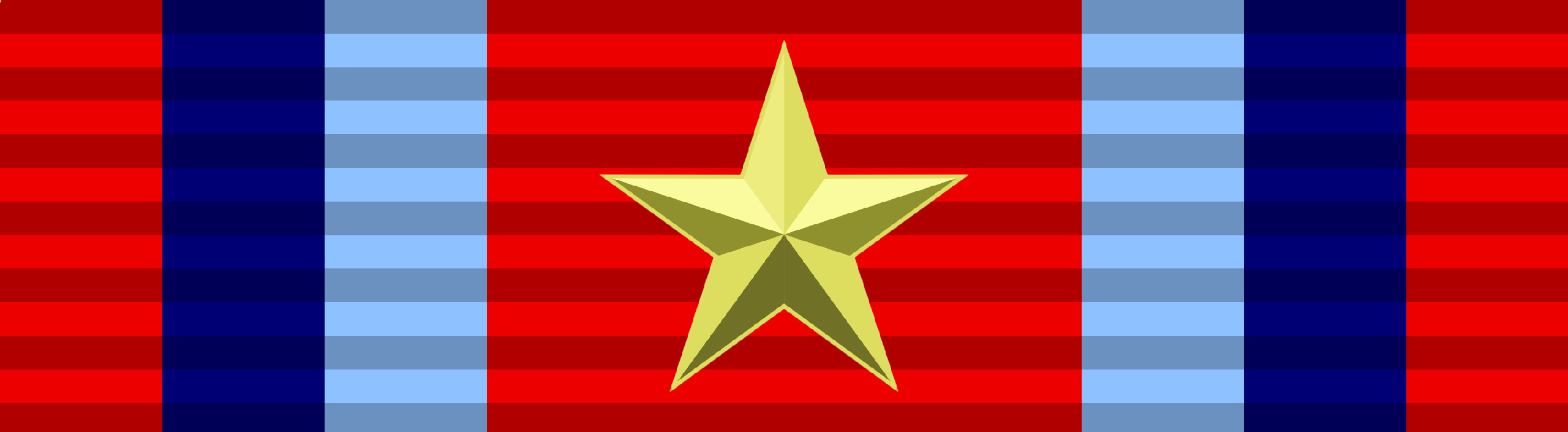
  - Officer of the Most Gallant Order of Military Service (KAT)
  - Recipient of the Malaysian Service Medal (PJM)
- Kedah
  - Knight Grand Companion of the Order of Loyalty to the Royal House of Kedah (SSDK) – Dato' Seri (2008)
  - Knight Commander of the Order of Loyalty to Sultan Abdul Halim Mu'adzam Shah (DHMS) – Dato' Paduka (2006)
  - Knight Commander of the Glorious Order of the Crown of Kedah (DGMK) – Dato' Wira (2005)
  - Recipient of Sultan Abdul Halim Golden Jubilee Medal (2008)
- Kelantan
  - Knight Grand Commander of the Order of the Noble Crown of Kelantan (SPKK) – Dato' (2005)
  - Recipient of the Sultan Ismail Petra Silver Jubilee Medal (2004)
- Negeri Sembilan
  - Knight Grand Commander of the Order of Tuanku Jaafar (SPTJ) – Dato' Seri (2005)
- Pahang
  - Knight Grand Companion of the Order of Sultan Ahmad Shah of Pahang (SSAP) – Dato' Sri (2004)
  - Grand Knight of the Order of the Crown of Pahang (SIMP) – formerly Dato', now Dato' Indera (2003)
  - Knight Companion of the Order of Sultan Ahmad Shah of Pahang (DSAP) – Dato' (2002)
  - Knight Companion of the Order of the Crown of Pahang (DIMP) – Dato' (1998)
  - Recipient of the Sultan Ahmad Shah Silver Jubilee Medal (1999)
- Perak
  - Knight Grand Commander of the Order of Taming Sari (SPTS) – Dato' Seri Panglima (2005)
- Perlis
  - Knight Grand Commander of the Order of the Crown of Perlis (SPMP) – Dato' Seri (2007)

=== Foreign honours ===
- Brunei
  - First Class of the Most Exalted Order of Paduka Keberanian Laila Terbilang (DPKT) – Dato Paduka Seri
- France
  - Officer of the Legion of Honour
- Indonesia
  - First class (Utama) of the Star of Yudha Dharma (2010)
- Singapore
  - Darjah Utama Bakti Cemerlang (DUBC) (2009)
- Thailand
  - Knight Grand Cross of the Order of the Crown of Thailand (PM) (2010)
