= Yaacob Mohd Zain =

10th Chief of the Malaysian Defence Forces (1992–1993)

Yang Berbahagia General (Rtd) Tan Sri Yaacob Mohd Zain PGAT PMN PSM SPKK SPTS DPSK DPTS DSDK JMN KMN ADK PJK PKB KPK PPA PPM PJM PM
- يعقوب محمد زين
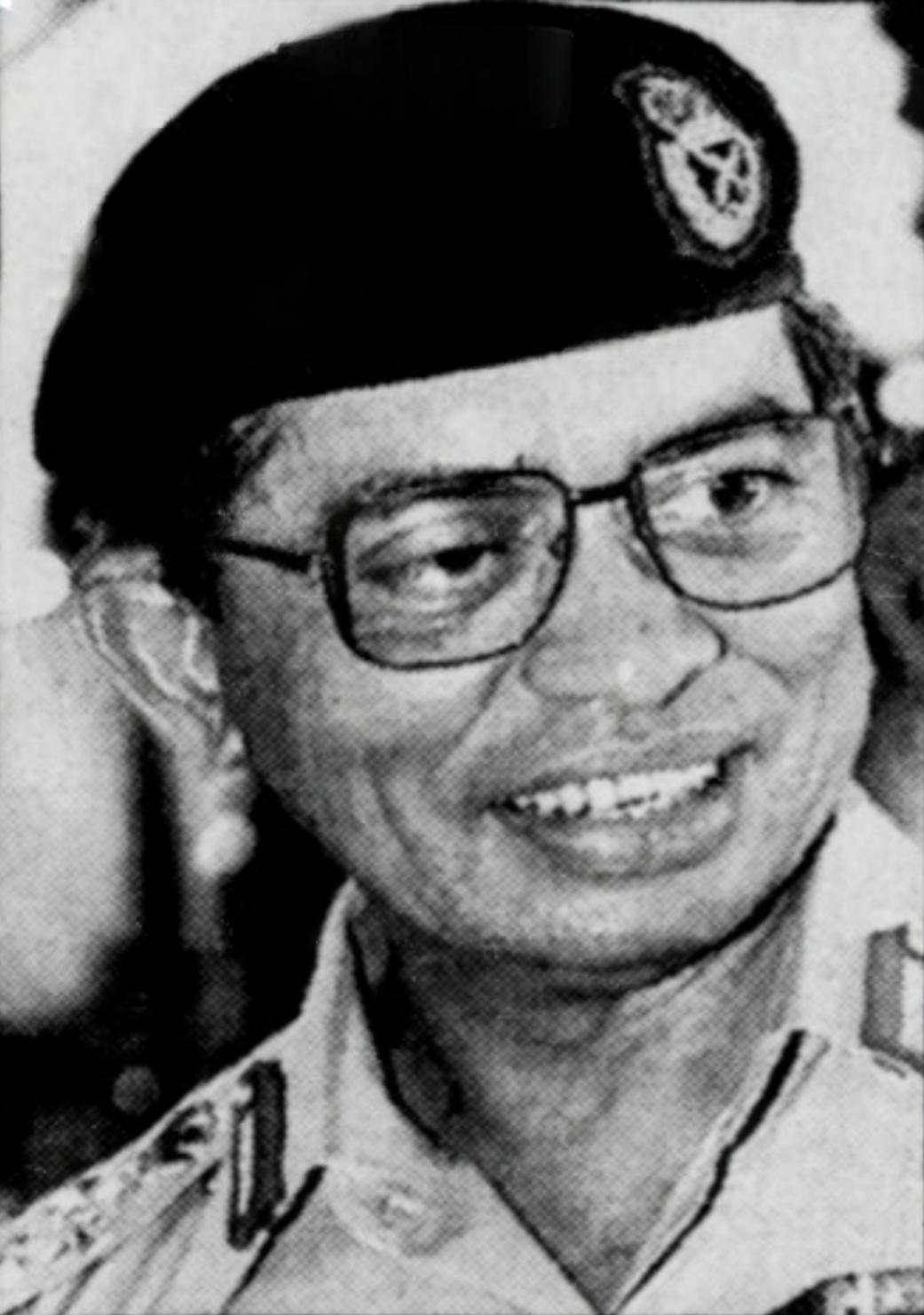
- Yaacob in 1992

10th Chief of Defence Forces
- In office 11 April 1992 – 3 March 1993
- Monarch: Azlan Shah
- Prime Minister: Mahathir Mohamad
- Minister of Defence: Najib Razak
- Preceded by: Mohamed Hashim Mohd Ali
- Succeeded by: Abdul Rahman Abdul Hamid

11th Chief of Army
- In office 6 October 1987 – 10 April 1992
- Preceded by: Mohamed Hashim Mohd Ali
- Succeeded by: Abdul Rahman Abdul Hamid

Personal details
- Born: 16 December 1935 (age 90) Kota Bharu, Kelantan, Unfederated Malay States
- Spouse: Zainon Mohd Daud
- Children: 2
- Education: Royal Military Academy, Sandhurst

Military service
- Allegiance: British Malaya; Malaysia
- Branch/service: British Colonial Auxiliary Forces; Malaysian Army
- Years of service: 1955–1993
- Rank: General
- Unit: Royal Malay Regiment
- Battles/wars: Malayan Emergency; Indonesia–Malaysia confrontation; Second Malayan Emergency

Yaacob bin Mohd Zain (Jawi: يعقوب بن محمد زين; born 16 December 1935), was a Malaysian military officer who has served as the 10th chief of defence forces from April 1992 to March 1993. Prior to his appointment, he previously served as the 11th chief of Malaysian Army from October 1987 to April 1992.

== Educational background ==
Yaacob get his education in Machang before he attended basic military course at Federation Military College, Port Dickson in March 1953.

In mid-1954, he selected to undergo officer cadet course at the Royal Military Academy, Sandhurst and he also attended various courses at multiple institutions, such as Australian Army Command and Staff College in 1968, the Royal College of Defence Studies in 1983 and at Harvard Business School in 1993.

== Military career ==
=== Early military career ===
Yacoob was commissioned to second lieutenant at 15 July 1955 and posted as platoon commander at 6th Battalion, Royal Malay Regiment.

During his early military career, he served at multiple positions, such as training officer at the Federation Military College, commanding officer of 9th Battalion, Royal Malay Regiment in 1969 and defence attaché in Indonesia in 1975.

=== Rise to flag rank ===
Yaacob got rank promotion to brigadier general and appointed as secretary of the National Security Council in 1976 before he transferred to the Ministry of Defence to be appointed as director of Department of Military Intelligence a year later.

From 1980 to 1984, he led various positions, such as commander of 6th Infantry Brigade in 1980, commander of 3rd Infantry Division in 1981, Assistant Chief of Staff of Operations of the Malaysian Armed Forces Headquarters in 1982 and commander of 2nd Infantry Division in 1984.

In October 1985, he appointed as Deputy Chief of Malaysian Army and automatically got rank promotion to lieutenant general.

=== Get top command ===
On 6 October 1987, he appointed as 11th Chief of Malaysian Army, following his predecessor Mohamed Hashim Mohd Ali who appointed as 9th Chief of Defence Forces and he automatically got rank promotion to general.

On 12 February 1992, the Minister of Defence at the time, Najib Razak announced that Yaacob would be the 10th Chief of Defence Forces, following retirement of his predecessor, Mohamed Hashim Mohd Ali on 10 April in the same year. Yaacob officially took over the post on 11 April 1992.

He held until ended his military service extension on 4 March 1993 and he passed the baton to his successor, Abdul Rahman Abdul Hamid on the same day.

== Personal life ==
Yaacob was married Zainon binti Mohd Daud and had two children with her.

== Honours ==
=== Honours of Malaysia ===
- Malaysia
  - Commander of the Order of the Defender of the Realm (PMN) – Tan Sri (1992)
  - Commander of the Order of Loyalty to the Crown of Malaysia (PSM) – Tan Sri (1988)
  - Companion of the Order of the Defender of the Realm (JMN) (1980)
  - Officer of the Order of the Defender of the Realm (KMN) (1973)
  - Recipient of the Active Service Medal (PKB)
  - Recipient of the Mention in dispatches (KPK) (1972)
  - Recipient of the General Service Medal (PPA)
  - Recipient of the Malaysian Commemorative Medal (Bronze) (PPM (G)) (1965)
  - Recipient of the 9th Yang di-Pertuan Agong Installation Medal
- Malaysian Armed Forces
  - Courageous Commander of the Most Gallant Order of Military Service (PGAT) (1988)
  - Recipient of the Malaysian Service Medal (PJM)
- Johor
  - Recipient of the Sultan Ismail Coronation Medal
- Kedah
  - Knight Companion of the Order of Loyalty to the Royal House of Kedah (DSDK) – Dato' (1987)
- Kelantan
  - Knight Grand Commander of the Order of the Noble Crown of Kelantan (SPKK) – Dato' (1988)
  - Knight Commander of the Order of Loyalty to the Crown of Kelantan (DPSK) – Dato' (1983)
  - Recipient of the Sultan Yahya Petra Coronation Medal
- Pahang
  - Recipient of the Meritorious Service Medal (PJK)
- Perak
  - Knight Grand Commander of the Order of Taming Sari (SPTS) – Dato' Seri Panglima (1990)
  - Knight Commander of the Order of Taming Sari (DPTS) – Dato' Pahlawan (1986)
  - Recipient of the Sultan Azlan Shah Installation Medal
- Sabah
  - Member of the Order of Kinabalu (ADK)

=== Foreign honours ===
- Indonesia
  - First class (Utama) of the Star of Kartika Eka Paksi (1988)
- South Korea
  - First class (Tong-il Medal) of the Order of National Security Merit
- Thailand
  - Knight Grand Cross of the Order of the Crown of Thailand (PM)
