= Mohamed Hashim Mohd Ali =

Malaysian military officer (1937–2025)

Yang Amat Berbahagia Tun Mohamed Hashim Mohd Ali SSM PGAT PMN PSM SPMS SIMP SPTS DHMS DPMS DSDK JMN KMN AMN ABS PKB PPA PPM PJM

9th Chief of Defence Forces
- In office 6 October 1987 – 11 April 1992
- Preceded by: Mohd Ghazali Che Mat
- Succeeded by: Yaacob Mohd Zain

10th Chief of Army
- In office 1 November 1985 – 6 October 1987
- Preceded by: Mohd Ghazali Che Mat
- Succeeded by: Yaacob Mohd Zain

Personal details
- Born: 10 April 1935 Ipoh, Perak, Federated Malay States
- Died: 1 October 2025 (aged 90) Kuala Lumpur, Malaysia
- Resting place: Raudhatul Sakinah Islam Cemetery, Sungai Besi, Kuala Lumpur
- Spouse: Majmin Yahaya
- Relations: Ismail Mohamed Ali (brother); Siti Hasmah (sister); Mahathir Mohamad (brother-in-law)
- Children: 3

Military service
- Allegiance: Malaysia
- Branch: Malaysian Army
- Service years: 1957–1992
- Rank: General
- Conflicts: First Malayan Emergency; Second Malayan Emergency

Mohamed Hashim bin Mohd Ali (10 April 1935 – 1 October 2025) was a Malaysian military officer who served as the Chief of Defence Forces from 1987 to 1992, and as the Chief of Army from 1985 to 1987. He was the brother of Siti Hasmah, the wife of former prime minister Mahathir Mohamad.

== Background ==
Mohamed Hashim Mohd Ali was born on 10 April 1935 in Kuala Lumpur, to Mohd Ali Mohd Taib and Siti Khatijah Ahmad. His father came from Binjai, Sumatra, and his mother was from Melaka, Malaysia. He was the second youngest child of his parents.

Soon after finishing primary school, he was enrolled in Victoria Institution, Kuala Lumpur from 1948 to 1953. He was involved in various sporting activities, and represented the school for competitions in martial arts, swimming, and was the captain of the hockey team.

== Military career ==
In 1954, Hashim headed for Port Dickson in Seremban to enrol in the Pre-Officer Cadet Training Unit at the Federal Military College. He was among the 12 shortlisted for further training at Britain's Eaton Hall Officer Cadet School in Cheshire in March 1955. Shortly after, the cadets entered the prestigious Royal Military Academy, Sandhurst. In December 1957, he was drafted into the 3rd Batallion of the Royal Malay Regiment in Batu Gajah, Perak.

He first served as the aide-de-camp to General Sir Rodney Moore in 1959, and continued on as Battalion Commander of the 5th Royal Malay Regiment. In 1975, as Brigadier General he commanded the Rajang Area Security Command (RASCOM) in Sarawak for two years. During that time, he continued to direct the fight against the communist insurgents.

In 1980, after completing a course at the National Defence College, India, Hashim was promoted to the rank of Major General and appointed Chief of Staff at the Ministry of Defence in Kuala Lumpur.

In 1982, Major General Hashim returned to field duties as Commander of the Second Infantry Division at Camp Bellamy in Penang. In partnership with the 4th Royal Thai Army, both armies made significant inroads against communist activities along the border and north-eastern region of Malaysia. As a result, communist terrorists failed to carry out an armed rebellion, which eventually led to the signing of the peace agreement of Hat Yai in 1989.

In 1983, Major General Hashim was promoted to Lieutenant General and appointed Deputy Chief of Army. In November 1985, he was appointed Chief of Staff of the Army at the Ministry of Defense (MINDEF), where he took major steps to modernise the Malaysian Army. He led efforts to conduct a comprehensive review of the military including its size, structure, weaponry, training, logistics and welfare. He was promoted to Chief of the Army in 1985.

In October 1987, he took over the position of Chief of Defence Forces. General Hashim retired in April 1992 after almost 39 years of service.

== After retirement ==
After retirement, Hashim was appointed a director in several companies listed on Bursa Kuala Lumpur. In 1993 he was appointed Executive Chairman of SUKOM Ninety Eight Berhad, a company established by the Government of Malaysia to organize and manage the XVI Commonwealth Games held in Kuala Lumpur from 11 to 21 September, 1998.

== Personal life and death ==
Hashim was the second youngest among his siblings, which included:

- Ismail Mohamed Ali (1918–1998), served as the Governor of the Central Bank of Malaysia from 1962 to 1980 and also as the Chairman of Permodalan Nasional Berhad.
- Tan Sri Dato' Paduka Datin Dr. Saleha Mohd Ali (1923–2011).
- Siti Hasmah (1926–2026), a medical doctor, and the wife of Mahathir Mohamad, the 4th and 7th Prime Minister of Malaysia.
- Ahmad Razali Mohd Ali (1928–2001) served as the Menteri Besar of Selangor from 1982 to 1986.
- Jaffar Mohamed Ali (1932–2001) was a reputable businessman.

Hashim died from a stroke in Kuala Lumpur, on 1 October 2025, at the age of 90. He was buried at Raudhatul Sakinah Cemetery, Sungai Besi, Kuala Lumpur.

== Honours ==
=== Honours of Malaysia ===
- Malaysia
  - Grand Commander of the Order of Loyalty to the Crown of Malaysia (SSM) – Tun (2022)
  - Commander of the Order of the Defender of the Realm (PMN) – Tan Sri (1988)
  - Commander of the Order of Loyalty to the Crown of Malaysia (PSM) – Tan Sri (1987)
  - Companion of the Order of the Defender of the Realm (JMN) (1977)
  - Officer of the Order of the Defender of the Realm (KMN) (1971)
  - Member of the Order of the Defender of the Realm (AMN) (1962)
  - Recipient of the Active Service Medal (PKB)
  - Recipient of the General Service Medal (PPA)
  - Recipient of the Malaysian Commemorative Medal (Silver) (PPM (P))
  - Recipient of the 8th Yang di-Pertuan Agong Installation Medal
  - Recipient of the 9th Yang di-Pertuan Agong Installation Medal
  - Recipient of the 17th Yang di-Pertuan Agong Installation Medal
- Malaysian Armed Forces
  - Courageous Commander of the Most Gallant Order of Military Service (PGAT) (1986)
  - Recipient of the Malaysian Service Medal (PJM)
- Kedah
  - Knight Commander of the Order of Loyalty to Sultan Abdul Halim Mu'adzam Shah (DHMS) – Dato' Paduka (1991)
  - Knight Companion of the Order of Loyalty to the Royal House of Kedah (DSDK) – Dato' (1985)
- Pahang
  - Grand Knight of the Order of the Crown of Pahang (SIMP) – formerly Dato', now Dato' Indera (1988)
- Perak
  - Knight Grand Commander of the Order of Taming Sari (SPTS) – Dato' Seri Panglima (1986)
- Sarawak
  - Member of the Most Exalted Order of the Star of Sarawak (ABS)
  - Gold Medal of the Sarawak Independence Diamond Jubilee Medal (2023)
- Selangor
  - Knight Grand Commander of the Order of the Crown of Selangor (SPMS) – Dato' Seri (1989)
  - Knight Commander of the Order of the Crown of Selangor (DPMS) – Dato' (1981)

=== Foreign honours ===
- Brunei
  - First Class of the Order of Paduka Keberanian Laila Terbilang (DPKT) – Dato Paduka Seri (1991)
- Indonesia
  - First Class (Utama) of the Star of Yudha Dharma (1992)
- United Kingdom
  - Recipient of the General Service Medal with "MALAYA" clasp
