= Mohd Sany Abdul Ghaffar =

6th Chief of Defence Forces (Malaysia)

Yang Berbahagia General (Rtd) Tan Sri Dato' Seri Panglima Mohd Sany Abdul Ghaffar PMN SPTS PSM DPMS DPMP JMN PMK PPM

6th Chief of Defence Forces
- In office 1 December 1977 – 19 January 1981
- Monarchs: Yahya Petra; Ahmad Shah
- Prime Minister: Hussein Onn; Mahathir Mohamad
- Minister of Defence: Hussein Onn; Abdul Taib Mahmud; Mahathir Mohamad
- Preceded by: Ibrahim Ismail
- Succeeded by: Mohd Ghazali Mohd Seth

6th Chief of Army
- In office 1 July 1975 – 30 November 1977
- Preceded by: Ungku Nazaruddin Ungku Mohamed
- Succeeded by: Mohd Ghazali Mohd Seth

Personal details
- Born: 19 January 1929 Selayang, Selangor, Federated Malay States, British Malaya (now Malaysia)
- Died: 21 August 2015 (aged 88) Institut Jantung Negara, Kuala Lumpur, Malaysia
- Resting place: Royal Malay Regiment Section, Armed Forces Islamic Cemetery, Port Dickson, Negeri Sembilan
- Spouse: Puan Sri Normah Mahmud
- Children: 5 (including Tan Sri Mohd Reza Mohd Sany)

Military service
- Allegiance: Malaysia
- Branch/service: Malaysian Army
- Years of service: 1949-1982
- Rank: General
- Unit: Royal Malay Regiment

Mohd Sany bin Abdul Ghaffar (19 January 1927 – 21 August 2015) was the 6th Chief of Defence Forces of Malaysia.

== Death ==
Mohd Sany died on 21 August 2015 at the age of 88 and was buried at the Royal Malay Regiment section of the Armed Forces Muslim cemetery in Port Dickson, Negeri Sembilan.

== Honours ==
=== Honours of Malaysia ===
- Malaysia :
  - Recipient of the Malaysian Commemorative Medal (Silver) (PPM) (1965)
  - Companion of the Order of the Defender of the Realm (JMN) (1967)
  - Commander of the Order of Loyalty to the Crown of Malaysia (PSM) – Tan Sri (1976)
  - Commander of the Order of the Defender of the Realm (PMN) – Tan Sri (1978)
- Kelantan :
  - Commander of the Order of the Crown of Kelantan (PMK) (1968)
- Perak :
  - Knight Commander of the Order of the Perak State Crown (DPMP) – Dato' (1969)
  - Knight Grand Commander of the Order of Taming Sari (SPTS) – Dato' Seri Panglima (1978)
- Selangor :
  - Knight Commander of the Order of the Crown of Selangor (DPMS) – Dato' (1976)

=== Foreign Honours ===
- Indonesia :
  - Honorary Recipient of the Bintang Kartika Eka Paksi Utama (1976)
