= Abdul Rahman Abdul Hamid =

11th Chief of the Malaysian Defence Forces (1993–1994)

Yang Berbahagia General (Rtd) Tan Sri Abdul Rahman Abdul Hamid PGAT PMN SIMP SPTS DMPN DPTS PAT JMN PMP KMN PKB PPA PPM PJM
- عبد الرحمن عبد الحميد
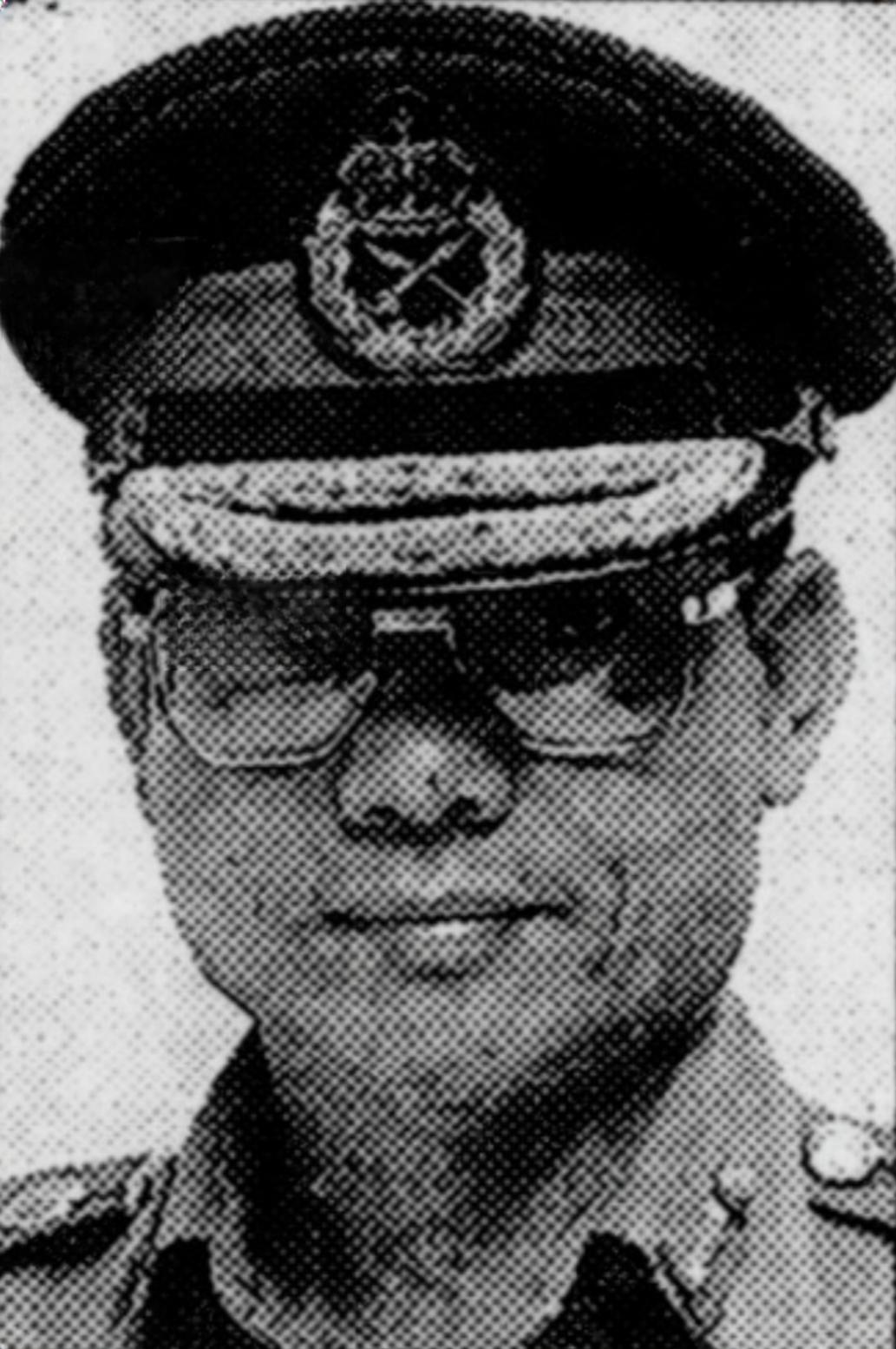
- Abdul Rahman in 1993

Acting Yang di-Pertua Negeri of Penang
- In office 6 May 1994 – 14 June 1994
- Chief Minister: Koh Tsu Koon

11th Chief of Defence Forces
- In office 4 March 1993 – 31 January 1994
- Monarch: Azlan Shah
- Prime Minister: Mahathir Mohamad
- Minister of Defence: Najib Razak
- Preceded by: Yaacob Mohd Zain
- Succeeded by: Borhan Ahmad

12th Chief of Army
- In office 11 April 1992 – 3 March 1993
- Preceded by: Yaacob Mohd Zain
- Succeeded by: Borhan Ahmad

Personal details
- Born: 11 November 1938 Sungai Siput, Perak, Federated Malay States
- Died: 2 June 2022 (aged 83) Tuanku Mizan Military Hospital, Kuala Lumpur, Malaysia
- Spouse: Rosilah Ahmad
- Children: 4
- Education: Federation Military College, Port Dickson

Military service
- Allegiance: Malaysia
- Branch/service: Malaysian Army
- Years of service: 1958–1994
- Rank: General
- Unit: Royal Malay Regiment
- Battles/wars: Malayan Emergency; Indonesia–Malaysia confrontation; Second Malayan Emergency

Abdul Rahman bin Abdul Hamid (Jawi: عبد الرحمن بن عبد الحميد; 11 November 1938 – 2 June 2022), was a Malaysian military officer who has served as the 11th Chief of Defence Forces from March 1993 to January 1994. Prior to his appointment, he previously served as the 12th Chief of Malaysian Army from April 1992 to March 1993.

Unlike his predecessors who graduated from Sandhurst, he is the first graduated from Federation Military College who served as both the chief of the Army and then as chief of defence forces.

== Educational background ==
Abdul Rahman began his school life at Ulu Kuang Malay School and then he get secondary education at Sekolah Menengah Kebangsaan Anderson, Ipoh until sixth form before he selected to continue his secondary education as the first batch at Federation Military College, Port Dickson in 1952.

During his military career, he attended course at the Staff College, Camberley from 1968 to 1969.

== Military career ==
=== Early military career ===
Abdul Rahman was commissioned to second lieutenant on 11 December 1958 and posted to 3rd Battalion, Royal Malay Regiment.

During his early military career, he served at multiple positions, such as training officer at the Federation Military College in 1964, second-in-command of company at the 9th Battalion, Royal Malay Regiment in 1965, staff officer at East Malaysia Army Command HQ in 1967, aide-de-camp for 4th Chief of Armed Forces Staff, Abdul Hamid Bidin and later as commanding officer of 12th Battalion, Royal Malay Regiment in 1970, deputy director of Joint Intelligence Directorate in 1972 and 1977, defence attaché in Philippines in 1975, and commander of Recruit Training Centre, Port Dickson in early 1980.

=== Rise to flag rank and get top command ===
Abdul Rahman got rank promotion to brigadier general and appointed as commander of 4th Infantry Brigade in late 1980.

Several years later, he appointed as director of Department of Military Intelligence before he transferred to the Malaysian Armed Forces Headquarters to took charge the Assistant Chief of Staff of Operations and got rank promotion to major general in October 1985.

In January 1987, he took charge commander of 2nd Infantry Division, and then he got rank promotion to lieutenant general and appointed as Chief of Staff of the Malaysian Armed Forces Headquarters three years later.

On 11 April 1992, he appointed as 12th Chief of Malaysian Army, following his predecessor Yaacob Mohd Zain who appointed as 10th Chief of Defence Forces and he automatically got rank promotion to general.

On 23 February 1993, the Minister of Defence at the time, Najib Razak announced that Abdul Rahman would be the 11th Chief of Defence Forces, following the end of military service extension of his predecessor, Yaacob Mohd Zain on 31 May in the same year. Abdul Rahman officially took over the post on 4 March 1993.

He held until ended his military service extension on 1 February 1994 and he passed the baton to his successor, Borhan Ahmad on the same day.

=== Post military career ===
On 6 May 1994, Abdul Rahman appointed as acting Yang di-Pertua Negeri of Penang following temporary off duty of the incumbent, Hamdan Sheikh Tahir to undergo coronary bypass surgery. He held the post until 14 June 1994.

== Personal life ==
=== Family ===
Abdul Rahman was married Rosilah binti Ahmad and had four children with her.

=== Death ===
Abdul Rahman was died at 2:15 AM on 2 June 2022, at Tuanku Mizan Military Hospital, Kuala Lumpur due to a bacterial infection in his lungs. Then in the afternoon, he was buried at Raudhatul Sakinah Muslim Cemetery in Sungai Besi.

== Honours ==
- Malaysia
  - Commander of the Order of the Defender of the Realm (PMN) – Tan Sri (1993)
  - Companion of the Order of the Defender of the Realm (JMN) (1987)
  - Officer of the Order of the Defender of the Realm (KMN) (1975)
  - Recipient of the Active Service Medal (PKB)
  - Recipient of the General Service Medal (PPA)
  - Recipient of the Malaysian Commemorative Medal (Bronze) (PPM (G))
  - Recipient of the 9th Yang di-Pertuan Agong Installation Medal
- Malaysian Armed Forces
  - Courageous Commander of the Most Gallant Order of Military Service (PGAT)
  - Warrior of the Most Gallant Order of Military Service (PAT)
  - Recipient of the Malaysian Service Medal (PJM)
- Pahang
  - Knight Grand Companion of the Order of the Crown of Pahang (SIMP) – formerly Dato', now Dato' Indera (1993)
- Penang
  - Companion of the Order of the Defender of State (DMPN) – Dato' (1990)
- Perak
  - Knight Grand Commander of the Order of Taming Sari (SPTS) – Dato' Seri Panglima (1992)
  - Knight Commander of the Order of Taming Sari (DPTS) – Dato' Pahlawan (1986)
  - Commander of the Order of the Perak State Crown (PMP) (1977)
