= Wisma Kementah =

Malaysian military administrative building

Wisma Kementah ويسما كمنته
- Interactive map of the Wisma Kementah ويسما كمنته area
- Alternative names: See below

General information
- Location: Camp Mindef, Keramat, 15, Jalan Padang Tembak, Kem Kementah, 50634 Kuala Lumpur, Wilayah Persekutuan Kuala Lumpur, Kuala Lumpur, Malaysia
- Coordinates: 3.1752°N 101.7254°E
- Groundbreaking: 10 March 1982
- Completed: 1985
- Inaugurated: 5 February 1988
- Cost: RM144,000,000
- Owner: Ministry of Defence
- Operator: Kuala Lumpur Garrison

Technical details
- Floor count: 20
- Floor area: 68,400 square feet (6,350 m^{2})
- Grounds: 10.6 acres (43,000 m^{2})

Wisma Kementah (Jawi: ويسما كمنته), commonly known as Wisma Pertahanan (ويسما ڤرتاهنن), is the main administrative building for the Ministry of Defence, the Malaysian Armed Forces, and its three military branches. The names Wisma Kementah and Wisma Pertahanan are officially recognised in Malay and are used interchangeably in all languages.

Located in Camp Mindef, Kuala Lumpur, the complex houses the offices of the Minister of Defence, the Deputy Minister, and various senior defence leadership positions, including the Chief of Defence Forces, the Chief Secretary to the Ministry of Defence, the Chief of Army, the Chief of Navy, and the Chief of Air Force, as well as their respective deputies.

== Etymology ==
The official name of the building is Wisma Kementah, a shortened form of Wisma Kementerian Pertahanan (ويسما كمنترين ڤرتاهنن), which translates to Ministry of Defence Complex. During the 1990s, the building became commonly referred to by the public as Wisma Pertahanan, a name that was eventually adopted as one of its official designations.

Today, the names Wisma Kementah, Wisma MINDEF, Wisma Kementerian Pertahanan, Wisma Pertahanan, Ibu Pejabat Kementerian Pertahanan Malaysia (Ministry of Defence Headquarters), Markas Angkatan Tentera (Malaysian Armed Forces Headquarters), Markas Tentera Darat (Malaysian Army Headquarters), Markas Tentera Laut (Royal Malaysian Navy Headquarters), and Markas Tentera Udara (Royal Malaysian Air Force Headquarters) are all used to refer to the same building.

== History ==
=== Origins: Initial Ministry Headquarters ===
The Ministry of Defence was established concurrently with Malaya's independence from the United Kingdom on 31 August 1957. Shortly after its formation, the first Minister of Defence, Tun Abdul Razak Hussein, established his office in a colonial-era estate house situated on a hill near Brockman Road (present-day Jalan Dato' Onn) in Kuala Lumpur. This location served as the first iteration of what would later be known as Wisma Kementah.

Later that same year, a new site—formerly a rifle range—was allocated to the ministry, and a two-storey stone building was constructed to serve as the ministry's new headquarters. Officially inaugurated by Tun Abdul Razak on 18 March 1960, the ministry relocated to the new premises. This structure came to be known as the First MINDEF Building (Malay: Bangunan Pertama MINDEF).

In 1967, a larger facility comprising six four-storey blocks was completed adjacent to the original structure. Inaugurated by Tunku Abdul Rahman on 6 April 1967, this complex became the headquarters for both the Ministry and the Malaysian Armed Forces. It is today known as the Second MINDEF Building (Malay: Bangunan Kedua MINDEF).

=== Wisma Kementah ===
On 10 March 1982, Dato' Abang Abu Bakar Abang Mustapha, then Deputy Minister of Defence, officiated the groundbreaking ceremony and laid the foundation stone for a new high-rise complex on a 10.6 acres (43,000 m^{2}) site adjacent to the Second MINDEF Building. With a construction cost of RM144,000,000, (Note: Equivalent to approximately US$114,000,000 when adjusted for 2025 inflation.) the structure was designed in a modern architectural style (for its time), featuring a 20-storey tower shaped to resemble an armchair, complete with a watchtower and a rooftop helipad. It was envisioned as a modern fortress, intended to streamline Malaysia's defence administration by uniting the Ministry of Defence and the headquarters of the Malaysian Armed Forces, including all three service branches, under one roof—similar to the Pentagon in the United States or the Ministry of Defence Whitehall in the United Kingdom.

This consolidation also enabled cost savings, estimated at RM200,000 annually, by eliminating the need to rent additional office buildings. At the time, the Army Command was located at Camp Imphal, the Navy Command at Lumut Naval Base, and the Air Force Command at RMAF Kuala Lumpur Airbase, all in separate locations.

By mid-1985, construction was completed, and the relocation of various commands to the new building began in phases. On 5 February 1988, the building was officially inaugurated by then Minister of Defence, Dato' Tengku Ahmad Rithauddeen Tengku Ismail, and was formally named Wisma Kementah.

In the 1990s, the name Wisma Pertahanan became widely used and was eventually adopted as one of the building's official titles.

In January 2024, Camp Mindef, including all facilities within its perimeter such as Wisma Kementah, was placed under the administrative jurisdiction of the newly established Kuala Lumpur Garrison. The Kuala Lumpur Garrison functions as a base administration command, responsible for overseeing infrastructure, maintenance, support services, and facility management for both Camp Mindef and Camp Batu Kentomen.

== Occupants ==
As the principal administrative building for Malaysia's defence and military portfolio, Wisma Kementah serves as the headquarters for senior leadership and top-level executives from the Ministry of Defence and various agencies and military branches under its jurisdiction. Its tenants include the following:

- Ministry of Defence
  - Minister of Defence
  - Deputy Minister of Defence
  - Chief Secretary to the Ministry of Defence
- Malaysian Armed Forces Command HQ
  - Chief of Defence Forces
  - Chief of Staff of the Malaysian Armed Forces
- Malaysian Army Command HQ
  - Chief of Army
  - Deputy Chief of Army
- Royal Malaysian Navy Command HQ
  - Chief of Navy
  - Deputy Chief of Navy
- Royal Malaysian Air Force Command HQ
  - Chief of Air Force
  - Deputy Chief of Air Force

== See also ==
- The Pentagon – The main administrative headquarters of the United States Department of Defense
- Ministry of Defence Main Building – Also known as MOD Whitehall, the main administrative headquarters of the United Kingdom Ministry of Defence
- Hexagone Balard – The main administrative complex of the French Ministry of the Armed Forces
