= Mohd Ghazali Che Mat =

8th Chief of Defence Forces (1931–2021)

Yang Berbahagia General (Rtd) Tan Sri Dato' Seri Panglima Mohd Ghazali Che Mat PGAT PMN SPTS SPMJ PSM DPTS DPMJ JSM ADK PPM PGB

8th Chief of Defence Forces
- In office 1 November 1985 – 6 October 1987
- Monarch: Iskandar
- Prime Minister: Mahathir Mohamad
- Minister of Defence: Mahathir Mohamad; Abdullah Ahmad Badawi; Tengku Ahmad Rithauddeen Ismail
- Preceded by: Mohd Ghazali Mohd Seth
- Succeeded by: Mohamed Hashim Mohd Ali

9th Chief of Army
- In office 17 January 1984 – 30 October 1985
- Preceded by: Zain Hashim
- Succeeded by: Mohamed Hashim Mohd Ali

Personal details
- Born: 19 December 1931 Lenggong, Perak, Federated Malay States
- Died: 7 July 2021 (aged 89) Tuanku Mizan Armed Forces Hospital, Wangsa Maju, Kuala Lumpur
- Children: SAC Zulfikar Mohd Ghazali
- Relatives: Muhammad Elias "Ez" Ghazali (grandson); Muhammad Johan "Jojo" Ghazali (grandson); Muhammad Mikael "Miki" Ghazali (grandson); Emylia Lynn "Mia" Ghazali (granddaughter); Jennana Lynn Johnson (daughter-in-law)

Military service
- Allegiance: Malaysia
- Branch/service: Malaysian Army
- Years of service: 1952-1987
- Rank: General
- Unit: Royal Malay Regiment

Mohd Ghazali bin Che Mat (19 December 1931 – 7 July 2021) served as Chief of the Malaysian Army from 1984 to 1985 and Chief of Defence Forces from 1985 to 1987.

== Death ==
Mohd Ghazali died at the Tuanku Mizan Armed Forces Hospital in Wangsa Maju on 7 July 2021 at the age of 89.

== Honours ==
=== Honours of Malaysia ===
- Malaya
  - Recipient of the Star of the Commander of Valour (PGB) (1958)
- Malaysia
  - Recipient of the Malaysian Commemorative Medal (Bronze) (PPM) (1965)
  - Companion of the Order of Loyalty to the Crown of Malaysia (JSM) (1971)
  - Commander of the Order of Loyalty to the Crown of Malaysia (PSM) – Tan Sri (1985)
  - Commander of the Order of the Defender of the Realm (PMN) – Tan Sri (1987)
- Sabah
  - Member of the Order of Kinabalu (ADK) (1968)
- Johor
  - Knight Commander of the Order of the Crown of Johor (DPMJ) – Dato'
  - Knight Grand Commander of the Order of the Crown of Johor (SPMJ) – Dato' (1986)
- Perak
  - Knight Commander of the Order of Taming Sari (DPTS) – Dato' Pahlawan (1978)
  - Knight Grand Commander of the Order of Taming Sari (SPTS) – Dato' Seri Panglima (1986)

=== Foreign Honours ===
- Indonesia
  - Honorary Recipient of the Bintang Kartika Eka Paksi Utama (1984)
