= Mohd Azumi Mohamed =

20th Chief of the Malaysian Army (2003–2004)

Yang Berbahagia General (Rtd) Tan Sri Mohd Azumi Mohamed PGAT PSM SPKK SIMP SPTS PSAT DGMK PGDK DPTS PGBK PAT JSM KAT AMN ACM AMP PPA PNBB PJM PM
- محمد أزومي محمد
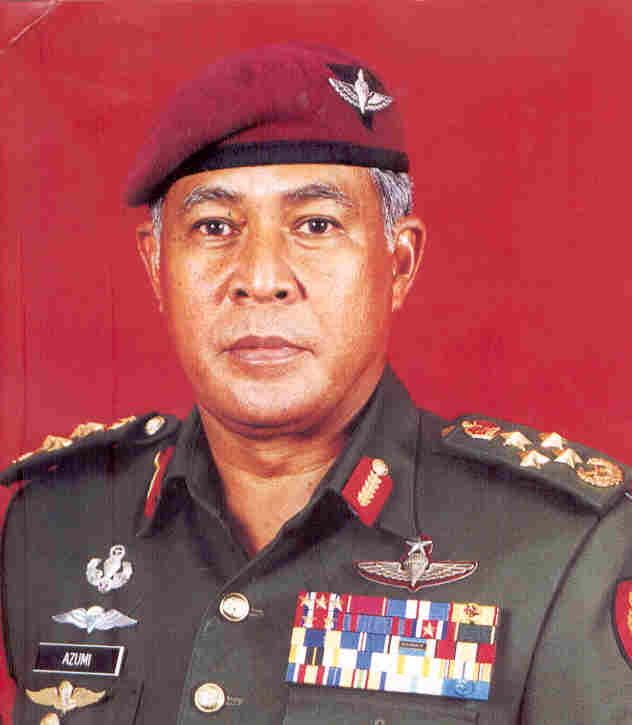
- Official portrait, 2003

20th Chief of Army
- In office 10 September 2003 – 8 September 2004
- Monarch: Sirajuddin
- Prime Minister: Mahathir Mohamad (2003); Abdullah Ahmad Badawi (2003–2004)
- Minister of Defence: Najib Razak
- Preceded by: Mohd Shahrom Nordin
- Succeeded by: Abdul Aziz Zainal

Personal details
- Born: 2 August 1948 (age 78) Batu Gajah, Perak, Federation of Malaya
- Spouse: Che Puteh Ahmad
- Children: 2
- Education: Royal Military College, Kuala Lumpur; Officer Cadet School, Portsea; National Defense University

Military service
- Allegiance: Malaysia
- Branch/service: Malaysian Army
- Years of service: 1969–2004
- Rank: General
- Unit: Royal Malay Regiment
- Battles/wars: Second Malayan Emergency

Mohd Azumi bin Mohamed (Jawi: محمد أزومي بن محمد; born 2 August 1948), is a Malaysian retired military officer who served as the 20th Chief of Malaysian Army from September 2003 to September 2004.

== Early life and education ==
Azumi was born on 2 August 1948 in Batu Gajah, Perak. He attended the Officer Cadet Course at Royal Military College, Sungai Besi before being selected to undergo Overseas Officer Cadet Training at the Officer Cadet School, Portsea and completed it in 1969.

Azumi also attended various courses, including Infantry Advanced Course at US Army Infantry School, Fort Benning, Georgia in 1978, Basic parachute course in 1980 and course at Malaysian Armed Forces Staff College in 1981. He attended at Australian Joint Services Staff College and graduated Diploma in Strategy in 1989. He also attended at National Defense University from 1994 to 1995 and graduated on Master of Science in Natural Resources and Strategy.

== Career ==
=== Military career ===
Azumi was commissioned to junior lieutenant on 14 June 1969 and posted as platoon commander in 3rd Battalion, Royal Malay Regiment. In January 1978, he transferred to 1st Battalion, Royal Malay Regiment as company commander. Throughout his military career, he has served in various positions. Some positions including as commanding officer of the 305th Territorial Infantry Battalion in June 1983, commanding officer of the 6th Battalion, Royal Malay Regiment in 1986, commander of the 10th Parachute Brigade in 1995 and commander of the 1st Infantry Division in January 1999.

On the overseas assignment, he has been served as commander of Malaysian Contingent as well as senior information officer for United Nations Iraq–Kuwait Observation Mission in April 1991. The assignment finished in May 1992.

Azumi was appointed 20th Chief of Army on 10 September 2003 following retirement his predecessor Mohd Shahrom Nordin and he get rank promotion to general on 15 September 2003. The position he held until his retirement on 8 September 2004 and succeeded by Abdul Aziz Zainal.

=== Post-military career ===
After his retirement from military, Azumi was appointed as Chairman of CyberSecurity Malaysia, an agency under the Ministry of Digital.

== Personal life ==
Azumi married Che Puteh binti Ahmad and blessed with two children. He likes play hockey at young age and he has been represented Perak hockey team in a match against a team from the armed forces in 1966.

== Honours ==
=== Honours of Malaysia ===
- Malaysia
  - Commander of the Order of Loyalty to the Crown of Malaysia (PSM) – Tan Sri (2011)
  - Companion of the Order of Loyalty to the Crown of Malaysia (JSM) (1996)
  - Member of the Order of the Defender of the Realm (AMN) (1979)
  - Recipient of the General Service Medal (PPA)
  - Recipient of the United Nations Missions Service Medal (PNBB) with "IRAQ-KUWAIT" clasp
  - Recipient of the 8th Yang di-Pertuan Agong Installation Medal
  - Recipient of the 9th Yang di-Pertuan Agong Installation Medal
  - Recipient of the 11th Yang di-Pertuan Agong Installation Medal
  - Recipient of the 12th Yang di-Pertuan Agong Installation Medal
- Malaysian Armed Forces
  - Courageous Commander of the Most Gallant Order of Military Service (PGAT)
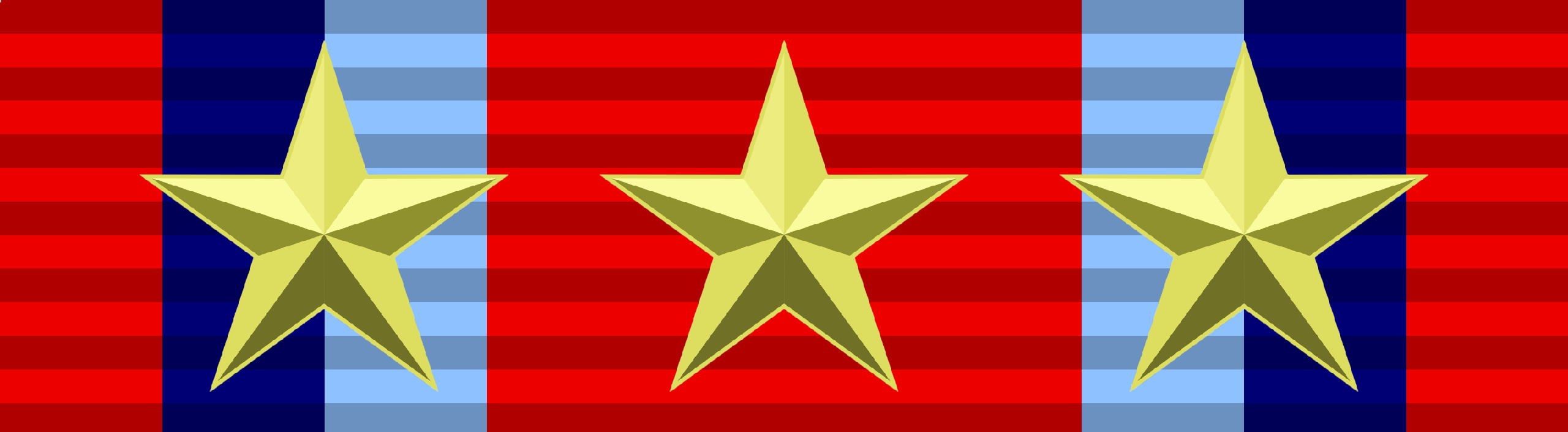
  - Loyal Commander of the Most Gallant Order of Military Service (PSAT) (2001)
  - Warrior of the Most Gallant Order of Military Service (PAT)
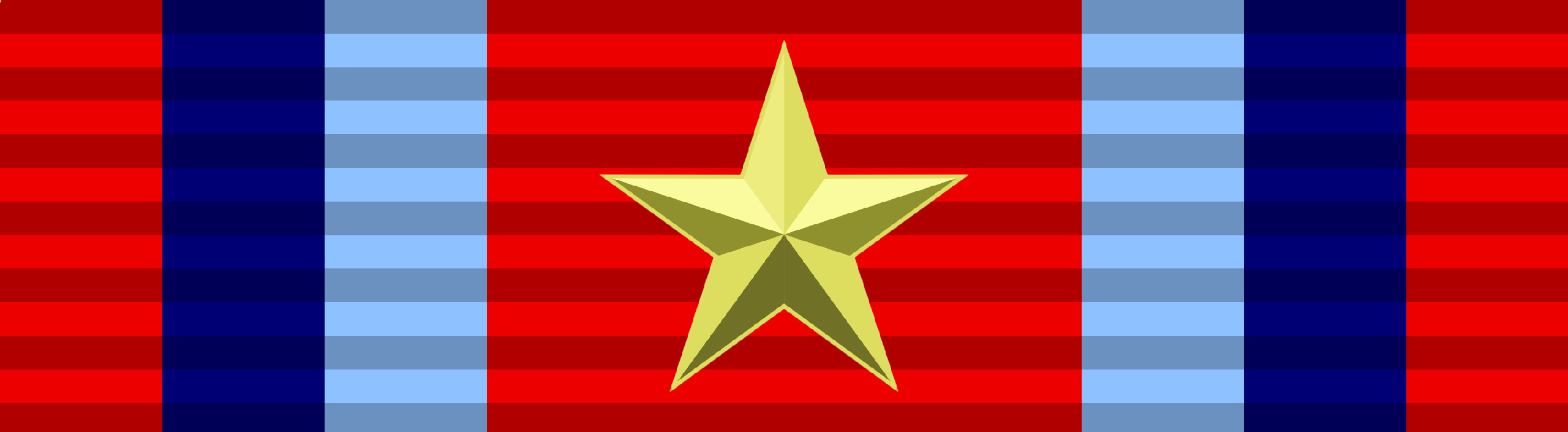
  - Officer of the Most Gallant Order of Military Service (KAT)
  - Recipient of the Malaysian Service Medal (PJM)
- Kedah
  - Knight Commander of the Glorious Order of the Crown of Kedah (DGMK) – Dato' Wira (2004)
- Kelantan
  - Knight Grand Commander of the Order of the Noble Crown of Kelantan (SPKK) – Dato' (2004)
- Pahang
  - Knight Grand Companion of the Order of the Crown of Pahang (SIMP) – formerly Dato', now Dato' Indera (2003)
  - Recipient of the Sultan Ahmad Shah Silver Jubilee Medal
- Perak
  - Knight Grand Commander of the Order of Taming Sari (SPTS) – Dato' Seri Panglima (2004)
  - Knight Commander of the Order of Taming Sari (DPTS) – Dato' Pahlawan (1996)
  - Member of the Order of Cura Si Manja Kini (ACM) (1989)
  - Recipient of the Sultan Azlan Shah Installation Medal
  - Recipient of the Sultan Azlan Shah Silver Jubilee Medal
  - Recipient of the Sultan Nazrin Shah Installation Medal
- Perlis
  - Member of the Order of the Crown of Perlis (AMP)
- Sabah
  - Commander of the Order of Kinabalu (PGDK) – Datuk (2001)
- Sarawak
  - Commander of the Order of the Star of Hornbill Sarawak (PGBK) – Datuk (2001)
  - Recipient of the Sarawak Independence Ruby Jubilee Medal

=== Foreign honours ===
- France
  - Officer of the Ordre national du Mérite
- Thailand
  - Knight Grand Cross of the Order of the Crown of Thailand (PM) (2005)
- United Nations
  - Recipient of the UNIKOM Medal (1992)
