= Eldeen Husaini Mohd Hashim =

Malaysian diplomat (born 1974)

Datuk Eldeen Husaini Mohd Hashim

Ambassador of Malaysia to France
- Incumbent
- Assumed office 20 March 2024
- Preceded by: Mohd. Zamruni Khalid

Ambassador of Malaysia to Cambodia
- In office 30 March 2019 – 12 March 2024
- Preceded by: Dato’ Hasan Malek
- Succeeded by: Shaharuddin Onn

Personal details
- Born: September 20, 1974 (age 52) Kuala Lumpur, Malaysia
- Spouse: Masdiana Mohamad
- Education: Sheffield Hallam University

Datuk Eldeen Husaini Mohd Hashim (born 20 September 1974) is a Malaysian career diplomat who is currently serving as ambassador of Malaysia to France, with concurrent accreditation to Portugal, Monaco and Andorra. He was previously Malaysia's ambassador to Cambodia from 2019 to 2024, and the undersecretary of Southeast Asia division of the foreign ministry from 2017 to 2019. Throughout his career, Eldeen Husaini has been assigned to Japan, Australia, and India.

== Early life and education ==
Born on 20 September 1974 in Kuala Lumpur, Eldeen earned his Bachelor of Laws (LLB) degree from Sheffield Hallam University in 1996. After graduation, Eldeen practiced law for two years and briefly worked in an American consulting company, before planning to return to Malaysia for the army. However, his parents objection made him redirect his career path into the diplomatic service.

== Diplomatic career ==
Eldeen began his career in the foreign ministry as an administrative and diplomatic officer in Malaysia's foreign ministry in 1998, starting as an assistant secretary for economics until 2000 and for East Asia affairs from 2001 to 2003. He was then posted at the embassy in Japan, where he was accorded the diplomatic rank of second secretary, before being promoted to first secretary in 2005. He then returned to the foreign ministry headquarters in 2006, serving as the assistant secretary in the West Asia and North Africa for a year until 2007.

By 2007, Eldeen was promoted as principal assistant secretary, having been reassigned to the East Asia and South Asia division. His tenure in the division lasted for a few months, as on the same year he was transferred to the Southeast Asia and South Pacific division, retaining his portofolio until 2010. During this period, Eldeen, having attained the diplomatic rank of counsellor, was appointed as a special officer to the Chairman of Eminent Persons Group Malaysia-Indonesia from 2008 to 2009, and to the special envoy of Malaysia to Brunei Darussalam from 2009 to 2010.

In 2010, having reached the diplomatic rank of minister counsellor, Eldeen was sent to Australia as Malaysia's deputy high commissioner in the country. He served under high commissioners Salman Ahmad and Zainal Abidin Ahmad. In April 2014, following the Malaysia Airlines Flight 370 crash a few days earlier, Eldeen received a letter from hydrometeorologist Aron Gingis, who offered a new methodology in searching the missing flight by utilizing vapor trails from the plane's burning fuel. Although his suggestion was forwarded to Malaysia's operation room, Eldeen politely declined Gingis's proposal.

From 2014 to 2017, Eldeen was the consul general of Malaysia in Mumbai, India. During the 2015 floods in the region, Eldeen ensured the safety of Malaysian residing in the city. He was then appointed as the undersecretary of Southeast Asia division of the foreign ministry in 2017.

=== Ambassador to Cambodia ===
Eldeen was then named as ambassador to Cambodia after receiving his credentials from deputy king Nazrin Shah of Perak on 20 December 2018. His ambassadorial duties officially began on 30 March 2019, and he presented his credentials to King Norodom Sihamoni on 2 May 2019. During his tenure in Cambodia, he oversaw notable advances in bilateral ties, including the September 2019 signing of a Memorandum of Understanding on Tourism, an Agreement on Double Taxation Avoidance, and business-to-business agreements in insurance and development. During the COVID-19 pandemic, he led the embassy's efforts to organize repatriation flights for stranded Malaysians and launched the "We Care, We Share" welfare initiative, which delivered relief to over 500 Malaysians, local communities, frontliners, and more than 20 NGOs and religious institutions. He also prioritized defense diplomacy by engaging with Cambodia's 911 Special Forces and hosting the Malaysian Defence Cooperation Programme alumni, while actively advocating for expanded bilateral trade, investment, and tourism opportunities.

Aside from his diplomatic duties, Eldeen also focused his efforts in handling managing human trafficking and cross-border job scam crises affecting Malaysian citizens. Since the start of his tenure, the embassy under his leadership facilitated the rescue and repatriation of over 100 Malaysians who had been lured to Cambodia by lucrative overseas employment offers. Eldeen personally visited Malaysians detained in Cambodian immigration depots, where he personally inspected facilities and ensured detainees received proper meals and living conditions. He also conducted coordinations with Cambodian authorities as well as diplomatic counterparts from neighboring countries.

=== Ambassador to France ===
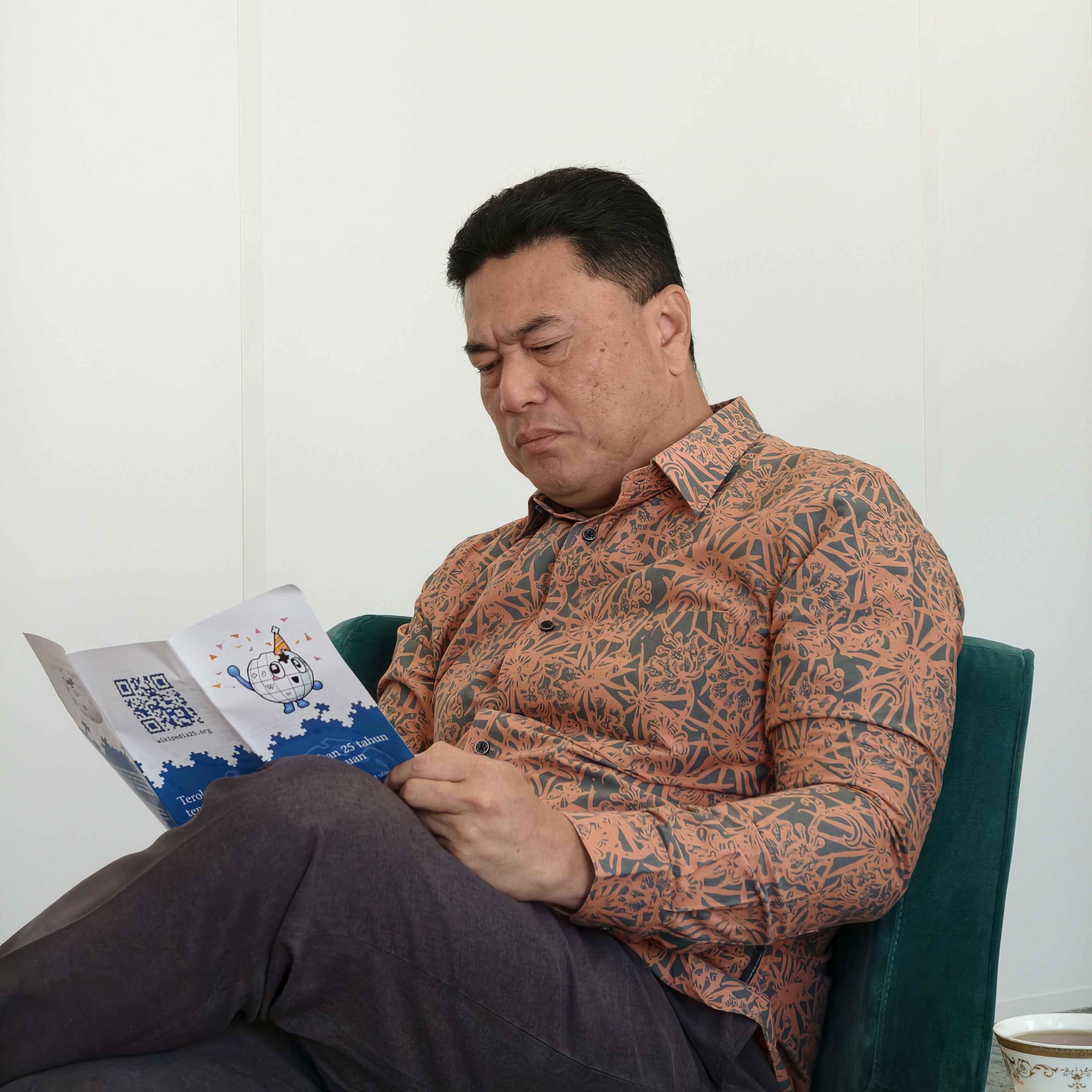
Eldeen reading a brochure about Wikipedia, July 2026.

Eldeen was named as ambassador to France, with concurrent accreditations to Portugal, Monaco, and Andorra, after receiving his credentials from King Ibrahim Iskandar of Johor on 20 March 2024. Officially beginning his duties on 16 April 2024, Eldeen presented his credentials to president Emmanuel Macron of France on 17 September 2024, President Marcelo Rebelo de Sousa of Portugal on 13 January 2025, and Albert II, Prince of Monaco on 4 April 2025. Eldeen oversaw the official visit of Malaysian Prime Minister Anwar Ibrahim to France in July 2025, during which several key agreements were finalized under his mission's coordination, including an MoU between MATRADE and Business France to boost trade in strategic sectors such as aerospace, renewable energy, and the digital economy. His diplomatic work in France has also emphasized cultural and linguistic outreach through the promotion of Malaysian gastronomy, music, and language, while supporting the resumption of daily direct flights between Kuala Lumpur and Paris flights by Malaysia Airlines to enhance two-way tourism and educational mobility between both nations.

== Personal life ==
Eldeen is married to Masdiana Mohamad.
