= Nadia Ghazzali =

Canadian statistician

Nadia Ghazzali (born April 3, 1961) is a Moroccan-Canadian statistician, the former president of the Université du Québec à Trois-Rivières, where she continues to work as a professor in the department of mathematics and computer science. As a statistician, she is known for her work on NbClust, a package in the R statistical software system for determining the number of clusters in a data set.

== Education and career ==
Ghazzali was born on April 3, 1961, in Casablanca. After studying at the University of Rennes 1 in France, she came to Canada as a postdoctoral researcher at McGill University, and joined the faculty at the Université Laval in 1993.

She was president of the Université du Québec à Trois-Rivières from 2012 until 2015, when she resigned after facing criticism from the Auditor General of Québec over management practices in university construction.

Ghazzali is current (2021-2023) Deputy President of INWES, the International Network of Women Engineers and Scientists.

== Recognition ==
At Laval, Ghazzali was given the NSERC Chair for Women in Science and Engineering (CWSE) in 2006. In the same year, she was named a corresponding member of the Hassan II Academy of Sciences and Technologies.
