= Lynda Ghazzali =

Entrepreneur and porcelain painter

- Born: Sarawak, Malaysia
- Education: University of Oxford
- Known for: Painting

Lynda Ghazzali (born in Sarawak, Malaysia) is an entrepreneur and a porcelain painter.

Ghazzali graduated with a Bachelor of Arts degree at the University of Oxford in the United Kingdom. She has been dubbed the “Queen of Porcelain” in Malaysia for her work in producing a vast collection of hand-painted porcelain pieces such as vases and plates. In 2011, she held a private exhibition of her artworks attended by high-profile personalities including members of Malaysian and foreign royalty.

In 2010, she founded The Women's Forum Malaysia, a platform for women of different backgrounds to share personal experiences and success stories, where she is a host and speaker.

She is married to a Tunisian-French, Dato’ Ali Ghazzali, thus taking on the honorific title of Datin, as the wife of a title holder.

== Career ==
Lynda previously held the role of Chief Executive Officer at Mabkon Securities Limited in the United Kingdom.

She is the founder of Hawa Ghazzali Collections specializing in jewellery made of Murano glass beads and silver. The business also includes the Hawa Ghazzali Haute Couture line of caftans designed by Lynda. In 2013, Lynda launched three Hawa Ghazzali Collections outlets in Kuala Lumpur.
