= Kuala Lumpur Garrison =

Administrative and support command for military installations in Kuala Lumpur

- Garison Kuala Lumpur ڬاريسون كوالا لومڤور
- Founded: 18 January 2024; 19 months ago
- Country: Malaysia
- Branch: Joint services
- Type: Administrative and support command
- Role: Administration; Command and control; Legal support; Logistics support; Security support
- Part of: Malaysian Armed Forces Headquarters
- Headquarters: Camp Mindef, Kuala Lumpur
- Nickname(s): Garison KL ('KL Garrison')
- Website: https://garisonkl.com

Commanders
- Current commander: Brigadier General Zulmadi Ariffin
- Command Sergeant Major: Warrant Officer 1st Class Nik Mohd Khairy Ibrahim

The Kuala Lumpur Garrison (Malay: Garison Kuala Lumpur; Jawi: ڬاريسون كوالا لومڤور) is a joint-services military command of the Malaysian Armed Forces (MAF), established in 2024. It is tasked with coordinating, synchronising, and providing support in matters of administration, security, legislation, and logistics for units and formations (Malay: Bahagian, Cawangan dan Jabatan Arah – BCJ) under the Malaysian Armed Forces Headquarters (MAFHQ).

The garrison is composed of personnel from all three branches of the MAF: the Malaysian Army, the Royal Malaysian Navy, and the Royal Malaysian Air Force. As a formation dedicated to defending Kuala Lumpur, the national capital, it is also responsible for supporting any military units stationed in the city during periods of armed conflict.

The Kuala Lumpur Garrison is commanded by Brigadier General Zulmadi Ariffin of the Malaysian Army, who serves as its inaugural commander.

== History ==
Prior to the establishment of the Kuala Lumpur Garrison, the management of military bases in the capital was not centralised. Administration and coordination were largely carried out by civilian officials from various government ministries, which often resulted in overlapping directives. While other garrisons existed in Malaysia, such as Gemas Garrison and Terendak Garrison, their centralisation was comparatively straightforward, as they operated under a single service, namely the Malaysian Army. Kuala Lumpur, by contrast, hosted formations from all three branches of the Malaysian Armed Forces (MAF), making coordination more complex.

In response, the Ministry of Defence and the Malaysian Armed Forces Headquarters (MAFHQ) decided to adopt a more centralised model similar to that used in Gemas and Terendak. On 18 January 2024, MAFHQ issued the directive establishing the Kuala Lumpur Garrison, placing it directly under the command of MAFHQ rather than a single service branch. The directive specified that the garrison would be commanded by a one-star officer, supported by two main sub-units: the Management Branch (Malay: Cawangan Pengurusan) and the Residential Quarters Branch (Malay: Cawangan Perumahan). Brigadier General Zulmadi Ariffin of the Malaysian Army was appointed as the inaugural commander.

On 28 November 2024, the Kuala Lumpur Garrison was relocated to a newly completed building within Camp Mindef, which now serves as its permanent headquarters. On the same date, the garrison was declared fully operational and commenced its duties. At present, it remains in the initial phase of development, with responsibilities limited to Camp Mindef and Camp Batu Kentomen, located approximately 6 kilometres (3.7 mi) apart. (Note: There are additional bases situated in Kuala Lumpur that do not fall under the command of the Kuala Lumpur Garrison)

== Roles ==
The Kuala Lumpur Garrison is tasked with coordinating, synchronising, and providing support in matters of base administration, base security, military legislation, and logistics for units and formations under the Malaysian Armed Forces Headquarters (MAFHQ). At present, its responsibilities are limited to administrative facilities at Camp Mindef and residential quarters at both Camp Mindef and Camp Batu Kentomen.

As a base administration command, the garrison oversees infrastructure, maintenance, support services, and facility management at these locations. Other establishments within Camp Batu Kentomen, such as the Ordnance Corps Training Centre, remain under the authority of the training centre itself and the Malaysian Army Training and Doctrine Command.

== Structure ==
=== Current structure ===
In addition to its two principal sub-units, the Management Branch and the Residential Quarters Branch, the Kuala Lumpur Garrison is also responsible for several other military formations. Its current structure comprises the following units:

- Headquarters, Kuala Lumpur Garrison. At Camp Mindef in Kuala Lumpur
  - Management Branch (Malay: Cawangan Pengurusan). At Camp Mindef in Kuala Lumpur
  - Residential Quarters Branch (Malay: Cawangan Perumahan). At Camp Mindef in Kuala Lumpur
  - Civil Management Branch (Malay: Cawangan Pentadbiran Awam). At Camp Mindef in Kuala Lumpur
  - 92nd Military Detention Centre (Malay: 92 Pusat Tahanan Angkatan Tentera). At Camp Batu Kentomen in Kuala Lumpur
  - 104th Military Police Company, Royal Military Police (Malay: Kompeni ke-104, Kor Polis Tentera Darat). At Camp Mindef in Kuala Lumpur
  - 601st Military Dental Centre (Malay: 601 Pusat Pergigian Angkatan Tentera). At Camp Mindef in Kuala Lumpur
  - 711th Military Medical Centre (Malay: 711 Pusat Perubatan Angkatan Tentera). At Camp Mindef in Kuala Lumpur
  - MINDEF Vehicle Fleet (Malay: Fleet Kenderaan Kementah). At Camp Mindef in Kuala Lumpur
  - MAF Army Officers' Mess (Malay: Wisma Perwira ATM). At Camp Mindef in Kuala Lumpur
  - MAF Non-commissioned Officer's Mess (Malay: Wisma Bintara ATM). At Camp Mindef in Kuala Lumpur
