= Chief of Defence Force (Malaysia) =

Head of Malaysian Armed Forces

Chief of the Defence Forces
- Panglima Angkatan Tentera ڤڠليما اڠکتن تنترا
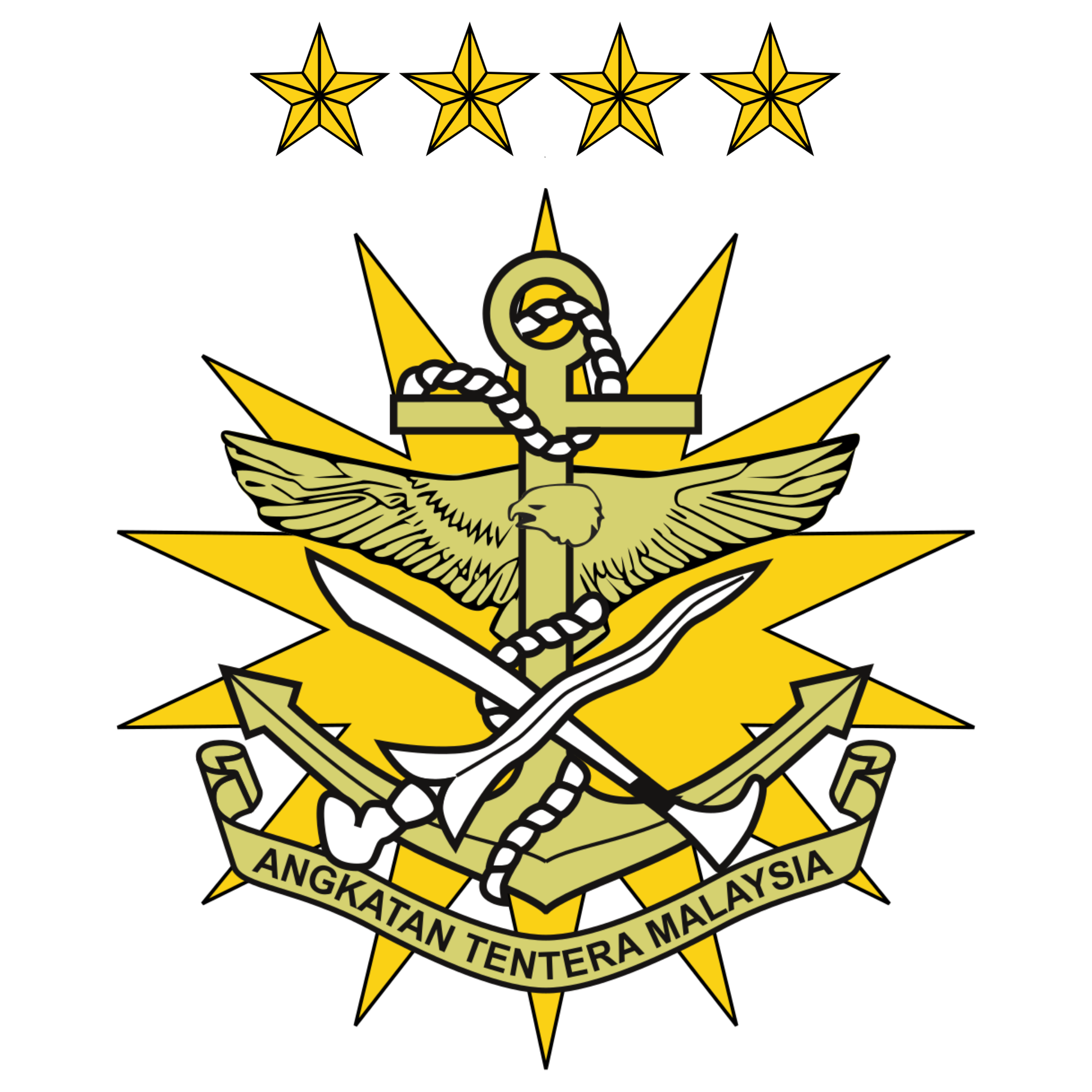
- Insignia of the Chief of the Defence Forces

- Flag of the Chief of the Defence Forces

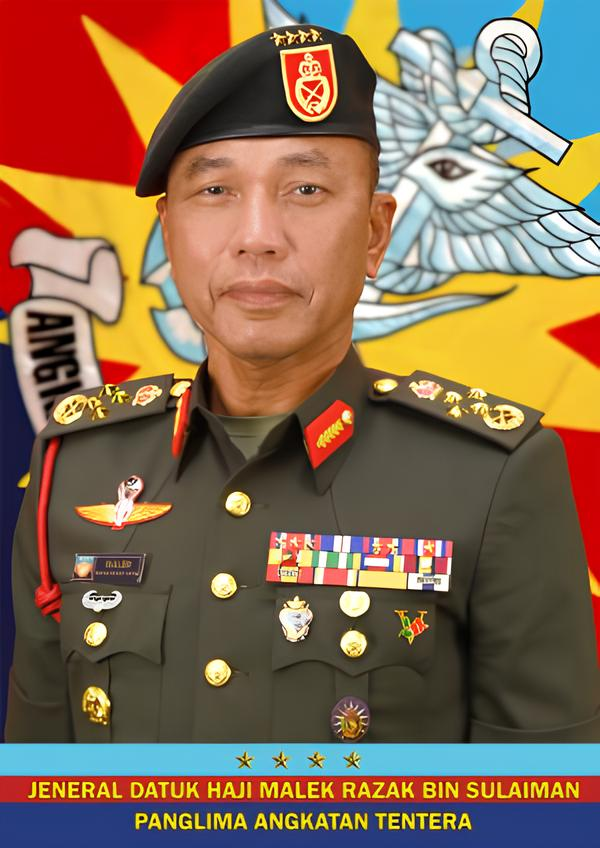
- Incumbent; General Tan Sri Malek Razak Sulaiman since 1 February 2026
- Ministry of Defence; Malaysian Armed Forces
- Style: Yang Berbahagia ('The Honourable'); Yang Mulia ('His Highness') (for royal descendant)
- Abbreviation: CDF
- Member of: Armed Forces Council
- Reports to: King of Malaysia; Minister of Defence
- Seat: Wisma Kementah, Camp Mindef, Kuala Lumpur
- Appointer: King of Malaysia
- Precursor: General Officer Commanding of Malaya Command
- Formation: 11 July 1956; 70 years ago
- First holder: Tan Sri Frank Hastings Brooke
- Salary: TURUS II
- Website: www.mafhq.mil.my/.../cdf-profile

The Chief of the Defence Forces (Abbr.: CDF, Malay: Panglima Angkatan Tentera, Jawi: ڤڠليما اڠکتن تنترا) is the professional head of the Malaysian Armed Forces and serves as the highest-ranking military officer in the country, second only to the King of Malaysia (Yang di-Pertuan Agong), who is constitutionally designated as the Supreme Commander of the Armed Forces.

The Chief of the Defence Forces functions as the principal military adviser to the King of Malaysia, the Prime Minister, and the Minister of Defence. The office is headquartered at Wisma Kementah, located within Camp Mindef (Malay: Kem Kementah), Kuala Lumpur, adjacent to the Ministry of Defence (MINDEF) complex.

Informally referred to as Perintah Ulung (lit. 'Superior Command'), the Chief of the Defence Forces is a key member of the Armed Forces Council, which includes the Minister of Defence, the King's representative, the Chief of Army, the Chief of Navy, the Chief of Air Force, the Chief of Staff, and other senior defence officials.

The position may be filled by a senior officer from any of the three service branches: the Malaysian Army, the Royal Malaysian Navy, or the Royal Malaysian Air Force. The title Panglima Angkatan Tentera (PAT) replaced the earlier designation Ketua Turus Angkatan Tentera (KTAT, Chief of Armed Forces Staff) in the early 1980s.

The role is the direct successor to the General Officer Commanding of Malaya Command, which was reorganised following Malaya's independence on 31 August 1957. Its final commander, Major General Frank Hastings Brooke, continued to lead the national force after the dissolution of Malaya Command, which was succeeded by the Malayan Armed Forces, the precursor to the present-day Malaysian Armed Forces.

== History ==
=== Pre-independence origins and Malaya Command ===
During the pre-independence period, Malaya was governed by the United Kingdom, and its military presence primarily comprised Commonwealth forces. While local formations such as the Penang and Province Wellesley Volunteer Corps and similar units in Singapore and other Malay states existed, these were generally regarded as militia rather than components of a unified federal force.

In 1924, the British established the Malaya Command to coordinate both regular and volunteer military units stationed across the peninsula. Its primary purpose was to defend British interests in Malaya in the event of conflict. The Malaya Command remained active until Malaya's independence in 1957, except during the Japanese occupation in the Second World War. The commanding officer held the title General Officer Commanding of Malaya Command, a position that would eventually evolve into the Chief of the Defence Forces.

On 23 January 1933, the Federal Council of the Federated Malay States passed the Malay Regiment Bill, which led to the establishment of the Malay Regiment—the first regular federal military unit to be raised locally. This regiment is known today as the Royal Malay Regiment.

=== Reorganisation under the Federation of Malaya ===
Following the establishment of the short-lived Malayan Union in 1946 and the subsequent political unrest, the British administration began to grant greater autonomy to local authorities. In 1948, the Federation of Malaya was formally created, although it continued to function as a de facto British protectorate. As part of this transition, the Malaya Command was restructured, and the newly formed Federation of Malaya Army was placed under its operational control. This force served as the predecessor of the present-day Malaysian Army. A new senior command position, titled General Officer Commanding, Federation of Malaya Army, was introduced to oversee its development.

During the Malayan Emergency, the Malay Regiment was expanded to seven battalions. It was further supported by the formation of a multiracial regiment and an armoured vehicle squadron. These components were consolidated into a single federal land force under the Federation of Malaya Army. Although the Federation also established naval and air elements, the land forces remained the dominant branch. As a result, the Chief of Army held the position of the most senior military officer in practice, serving as the effective head of the entire armed forces during this period.

=== Independence and the establishment of national command ===
Following the independence of the Federation of Malaya on 31 August 1957, the Malaya Command and its existing military units, including the Royal Malay Regiment, the Federation Regiment, the Federation Armoured Car Regiment (now known as the Royal Armoured Corps), and the Royal Malayan Navy (present-day Royal Malaysia Navy), were officially transferred from British to Malayan control. Additional support regiments were subsequently established to strengthen the new national defence force.

Major General Frank Hastings Brooke, who had served as both the final General Officer Commanding of Malaya Command and the General Officer Commanding of the Federation of Malaya Army, remained in his position under the new administration. He thereby became the first Chief of Defence Forces and concurrently the first Chief of Army of the independent Federation of Malaya.

=== Formation of the Malaysian Armed Forces ===
Following the formation of Malaysia on 16 September 1963, the armed forces of North Borneo (present-day Sabah), the Crown Colony of Sarawak, and the Colony of Singapore were integrated into the Malayan Armed Forces, forming a unified national military. In light of the expansion and increasing complexity of defence operations, the position of Chief of Defence Forces was formally separated from that of the Chief of Army, allowing for more effective leadership across all service branches.

== List of Chief of Defence Forces ==
As of 2026, a total of 24 individuals have been appointed Chief of the Defence Forces, including two from the Royal Malaysian Air Force and one from the Royal Malaysian Navy.

No.	Portrait	Chief of Defence Forces	Took office	Left office	Time in office	Defence branch	Ref.
1	Tan Sri Frank Hastings Brooke	Major General; Tan Sri Frank Hastings Brooke (1909–1982)	11 July 1956	26 October 1959	3 years, 108 days	Malaysian Army	
2	Tan Sri Sir Rodney Moore	Lieutenant General; Tan Sri Sir Rodney Moore (1905–1985)	27 October 1959	31 December 1963	4 years, 66 days	Malaysian Army	
3	Tan Sri Tunku Osman	Yang Mulia General; Tan Sri Tunku Osman (1919–1994)	1 January 1964	24 November 1969	5 years, 328 days	Malaysian Army	
4	Tan Sri Abdul Hamid Bidin	General; Tan Sri Abdul Hamid Bidin (1917–1995)	25 November 1969	30 June 1970	218 days	Malaysian Army	
5	Tun Ibrahim Ismail	General; Tun Ibrahim Ismail (1922–2010)	1 July 1970	30 November 1977	7 years, 153 days	Malaysian Army	
6	Tan Sri Dato' Seri Panglima Mohd Sany Abdul Ghaffar	General; Tan Sri Dato' Seri Panglima Mohd Sany Abdul Ghaffar (1927–2015)	1 December 1977	19 January 1981	3 years, 50 days	Malaysian Army	
7	Tan Sri Dato' Sri Mohd Ghazali Mohd Seth	General; Tan Sri Dato' Sri Mohd Ghazali Mohd Seth (1929–2021)	20 January 1981	31 October 1985	4 years, 285 days	Malaysian Army	
8	Tan Sri Dato' Seri Panglima Mohd Ghazali Che Mat	General; Tan Sri Dato' Seri Panglima Mohd Ghazali Che Mat (1931–2021)	1 November 1985	5 October 1987	1 year, 339 days	Malaysian Army	
9	Tun Tan Sri Mohamed Hashim Mohd Ali	General; Tun Tan Sri Mohamed Hashim Mohd Ali (1937–2025)	6 October 1987	10 April 1992	4 years, 188 days	Malaysian Army	
10	Tan Sri Dato' Seri Panglima Yaacob Mohd Zain	General; Tan Sri Dato' Seri Panglima Yaacob Mohd Zain (born 1935)	11 April 1992	3 March 1993	327 days	Malaysian Army	
11	Tan Sri Dato' Seri Panglima Abdul Rahman Abdul Hamid	General; Tan Sri Dato' Seri Panglima Abdul Rahman Abdul Hamid (1938–2022)	4 March 1993	31 January 1994	334 days	Malaysian Army	
12	Tan Sri Dato' Borhan Ahmad	General; Tan Sri Dato' Borhan Ahmad (born 1939)	1 February 1994	2 February 1995	1 year, 2 days	Malaysian Army	
13	Tan Sri Dato' Seri Ismail Omar	General; Tan Sri Dato' Seri Ismail Omar (born 1941)	3 February 1995	31 December 1998	3 years, 332 days	Malaysian Army	
14	Tan Sri Dato' Seri Mohd Zahidi Zainuddin	General; Tan Sri Dato' Seri Mohd Zahidi Zainuddin (born 1948)	1 January 1999	28 April 2005	6 years, 118 days	Malaysian Army	
15	Tan Sri Dato' Seri Mohd Anwar Mohd Nor	Admiral; Tan Sri Dato' Seri Mohd Anwar Mohd Nor (born 1951)	29 April 2005	31 January 2007	1 year, 278 days	Royal Malaysian Navy	
16	Tan Sri Dato' Seri Abdul Aziz Zainal	General; Tan Sri Dato' Seri Abdul Aziz Zainal (born 1951)	1 February 2007	31 August 2009	2 years, 212 days	Malaysian Army	
17	Tan Sri Dato' Seri Azizan Ariffin	General; Tan Sri Dato' Seri Azizan Ariffin (born 1953)	1 September 2009	14 June 2011	1 year, 287 days	Royal Malaysian Air Force	
18	Tan Sri Zulkifeli Mohd Zin	General; Tan Sri Zulkifeli Mohd Zin (born 1956)	15 June 2011	16 December 2016	5 years, 185 days	Malaysian Army	
19	Tan Sri Raja Mohamed Affandi Raja Mohamed Noor	Yang Mulia General; Tan Sri Raja Mohamed Affandi Raja Mohamed Noor (born 1958)	17 December 2016	19 June 2018	1 year, 186 days	Malaysian Army	
20	Tan Sri Zulkifli Zainal Abidin	General; Tan Sri Zulkifli Zainal Abidin (born 1960)	20 June 2018	1 January 2020	1 year, 196 days	Malaysian Army	
21	Tan Sri Affendi Buang	General; Tan Sri Affendi Buang (born 1962)	2 January 2020	5 September 2023	3 years, 247 days	Royal Malaysian Air Force	
22	Tan Sri Mohammad Ab Rahman	General; Tan Sri Mohammad Ab Rahman (born 1964)	6 September 2023	30 January 2025	1 year, 147 days	Malaysian Army	
23	Tan Sri Mohd Nizam Jaffar	General; Tan Sri Mohd Nizam Jaffar (born 1966)	31 January 2025	27 December 2025	331 days	Malaysian Army	
–	Tan Sri Zulhelmy Ithnain	Admiral; Tan Sri Zulhelmy Ithnain (born 1968); Acting	27 Disember 2025	31 January 2026	36 days	Royal Malaysian Navy	
24	Tan Sri Malek Razak Sulaiman	General; Tan Sri Malek Razak Sulaiman (born 1967)	1 February 2026	Incumbent	236 days	Malaysian Army	

== Lineage ==
1924	1957 Name change	1980s Name change
General Officer Commanding, Malaya Command	Chief of Armed Forces Staff (Malay: Ketua Turus Angkatan Tentera)	Chief of the Defence Forces (Malay: Panglima Angkatan Tentera)
