= Chief of Army (Malaysia) =

Most senior appointment in the Malaysian Army

- Panglima Tentera Darat ڤڠليما تنترا دارت
- Crest of Chief of Army
- Incumbent; General Dato' Azhan Md Othman since 1 January 2026
- Malaysian Army
- Style: Yang Berbahagia (The Honorable)
- Abbreviation: PTD
- Member of: Malaysian Armed Forces Council
- Reports to: Chief of Defence Forces
- Term length: Not fixed
- Formation: 11 January 1956
- First holder: Major general Dato' Sir F. H. Brooke
- Salary: TURUS II
- Website: www.mafhq.mil.my/.../panglima-tentera-darat

The Chief of Army (Malay: Panglima Tentera Darat — PTD, Jawi: ڤڠليما تنترا دارت) is the most senior appointment in the Malaysian Army and has been held by a four-star officer in the rank of General since 1977. The Chief of Army is a member of the Malaysian Armed Forces Council and directly reports to the Chief of the Armed Forces.

The current Chief of Army (Malay: Panglima Tentera Darat — PTD) is General Datuk Azhan Md Othman , who succeeded General Datuk Muhammad Hafizuddeain bin Jantan .

== List of officeholders ==
No.	Portrait	Name (born–died)	Term of office			Branch of service	Ref.
No.	Portrait	Name (born–died)	Took office	Left office	Time in office	Branch of service	Ref.
General Officer Commanding, Federation of Malaya Army
1	Dato' Sir Frank Hastings Brooke	Major General; Dato' Sir Frank Hastings Brooke (1909–1982)	11 July 1956	25 October 1959	3 years, 106 days	Welsh Guards	–
Chief of General Staff
2	Tan Sri Dato' Sir James Newton Rodney Moore	Lieutenant General; Tan Sri Dato' Sir James Newton Rodney Moore (1904–1985)	26 October 1959	4 September 1962	2 years, 313 days	Grenadier Guards	–
3	Tunku Osman Tunku Mohd Jewa	Yang Mulia Major General; Tunku Osman Tunku Mohd Jewa (1919–1995)	5 September 1962	31 December 1963	1 year, 117 days	Royal Malay Regiment	–
4	Tan Sri Abdul Hamid Bidin	Lieutenant General; Tan Sri Abdul Hamid Bidin (1918–1995)	1 January 1964	24 November 1969	5 years, 327 days	Royal Malay Regiment	–
5	Tan Sri Dato' Ungku Nazaruddin Ungku Mohamed	Yang Mulia Lieutenant General; Tan Sri Dato' Ungku Nazaruddin Ungku Mohamed (1923–2004)	25 November 1969	30 June 1975	5 years, 217 days	Royal Malay Regiment	–
6	Tan Sri Dato' Haji Mohd Sany Abdul Ghaffar	Lieutenant General; Tan Sri Dato' Haji Mohd Sany Abdul Ghaffar (1926–2015)	1 July 1975	30 November 1977	2 years, 152 days	Royal Malay Regiment	–
7	Tan Sri Dato' Mohd Ghazali Mohd Seth	General; Tan Sri Dato' Mohd Ghazali Mohd Seth (1929–2021)	1 December 1977	19 January 1981	3 years, 49 days	Royal Malay Regiment	–
Chief of Army
8	Tan Sri Dato' Zain Hashim	General; Tan Sri Dato' Zain Hashim (1930–2011)	20 January 1981	16 January 1984	2 years, 361 days	Royal Armoured Corps	–
9	Tan Sri Dato' Mohd Ghazali Che Mat	General; Tan Sri Dato' Mohd Ghazali Che Mat (1930–2021)	17 January 1984	30 October 1985	1 year, 286 days	Royal Malay Regiment	–
10	Tun Tan Sri Mohamed Hashim bin Mohd Ali	General; Tun Tan Sri Mohamed Hashim bin Mohd Ali (1937–2025)	1 November 1985	5 October 1987	1 year, 338 days	Royal Malay Regiment	–
11	Tan Sri Yaacob Mohd Zain	General; Tan Sri Yaacob Mohd Zain (born 1937)	6 October 1987	10 April 1992	4 years, 187 days	Royal Malay Regiment	–
12	Tan Sri Dato' Seri Haji Abdul Rahman Abdul Hamid	General; Tan Sri Dato' Seri Haji Abdul Rahman Abdul Hamid (1935–2022)	11 April 1992	3 March 1993	326 days	Royal Malay Regiment	–
13	Tan Sri Borhan Ahmad	General; Tan Sri Borhan Ahmad (born 1939)	4 March 1993	31 January 1994	333 days	21st Special Service Group	–
14	Tan Sri Dato' Seri Ismail Omar	General; Tan Sri Dato' Seri Ismail Omar (born 1941)	1 February 1994	2 February 1995	1 year, 1 day	Royal Malay Regiment	–
15	Tan Sri Dato' Seri Che Md Noor Mat Arshad	General; Tan Sri Dato' Seri Che Md Noor Mat Arshad (1943–2019)	3 February 1995	31 May 1997	2 years, 117 days	Royal Malay Regiment	–
16	Tan Sri Dato' Ismail Hassan	General; Tan Sri Dato' Ismail Hassan (born 1942)	1 June 1997	31 December 1997	213 days	Royal Malay Regiment	–
17	Tan Sri Dato' Seri Mohd Zahidi Zainuddin	General; Tan Sri Dato' Seri Mohd Zahidi Zainuddin (born 1948)	1 January 1998	31 December 1998	364 days	Royal Malay Regiment	–
18	Tan Sri Md Hashim Hussein	General; Tan Sri Md Hashim Hussein (born 1947)	1 January 1999	31 December 2002	3 years, 364 days	Royal Malay Regiment	–
19	Tan Sri Dato' Wira Mohd Shahrom Nordin	General; Tan Sri Dato' Wira Mohd Shahrom Nordin	1 January 2003	9 September 2003	251 days	Royal Malay Regiment	–
20	Tan Sri Dato' Sri Mohd Azumi Mohamed	General; Tan Sri Dato' Sri Mohd Azumi Mohamed	10 September 2003	8 September 2004	364 days	Royal Malay Regiment	–
21	Tan Sri Dato' Sri Abdul Aziz Zainal	General; Tan Sri Dato' Sri Abdul Aziz Zainal (born 1951)	9 September 2004	31 January 2007	2 years, 144 days	Royal Malay Regiment	–
22	Tan Sri Muhammad Ismail Jamaluddin	General; Tan Sri Muhammad Ismail Jamaluddin (born 1952)	1 February 2007	20 May 2010	3 years, 108 days	Royal Malay Regiment	–
23	Tan Sri Dato' Sri Zulkifeli Mohd Zin	General; Tan Sri Dato' Sri Zulkifeli Mohd Zin (born 1956)	21 May 2010	13 June 2011	1 year, 23 days	Royal Malay Regiment	–
24	Tan Sri Dato' Seri Panglima Haji Zulkifli Zainal Abidin	General; Tan Sri Dato' Seri Panglima Haji Zulkifli Zainal Abidin (born 1958)	14 June 2011	13 June 2013	2 years, 0 days	Royal Malay Regiment	–
25	Tan Sri Raja Mohamed Affandi	Yang Mulia General; Tan Sri Raja Mohamed Affandi (born 1958)	14 June 2013	16 December 2016	3 years, 185 days	Royal Malay Regiment	–
26	Tan Sri Dato' Sri Zulkiple Kassim	General; Tan Sri Dato' Sri Zulkiple Kassim (born 1959)	17 December 2016	2 September 2018	1 year, 259 days	Royal Malay Regiment	
27	Tan Sri Ahmad Hasbullah Mohd Nawawi	General; Tan Sri Ahmad Hasbullah Mohd Nawawi (born 1960)	3 September 2018	10 June 2020	1 year, 281 days	Royal Malay Regiment	
28	Tan Sri Zamrose Mohd Zain	General; Tan Sri Zamrose Mohd Zain (born 1962)	11 June 2020	22 March 2023	2 years, 284 days	Royal Malay Regiment	
29	Tan Sri Datuk Seri Mohammad Ab Rahman	General; Tan Sri Datuk Seri Mohammad Ab Rahman (born 1964)	22 March 2023	5 September 2023	168 days	Royal Malay Regiment	
30		General; Tan Sri Dato' Sri Muhammad Hafizuddeain Jantan (born 1968)	6 September 2023	5 January 2026	2 years, 102 days	Royal Malay Regiment	
31		General; Dato' Azhan Md Othman (born 1969)	1 January 2026	Incumbent	296 days	Royal Malay Regiment	

== See also ==
- Malaysian Army
- Chief of Defence Forces (Malaysia)
- Chief of Navy (Malaysia)
- Chief of Air Force (Malaysia)
- Deputy Chief of Army (Malaysia)
