= Order of precedence in Sarawak =

Relative preeminence of officials for ceremonial purposes

The Sarawak order of precedence is a nominal and symbolic hierarchy of important positions maintained by the Office of the Premier of Sarawak which lists the ceremonial order, or relative preeminence, for domestic and foreign government officials (military and civilian) at diplomatic, ceremonial, and social events within the territory of Sarawak. It has no legal standing but is often the document is used to advise diplomatic and ceremonial event planners on seating charts and order of introduction.

The first order was published by the Office of the Chief Minister of Sarawak in 18 September 1984. This order was updated on 20 April 1993, and then revised once more on 5 September 1996. A new version of the list is still under review by the premier's office.

== List ==
Order of precedence in Sarawak is as follows:

1. Governor of Sarawak (Wan Junaidi Tuanku Jaafar)
2. Premier of Sarawak (Abang Abdul Rahman Zohari Abang Openg)
3. Former governors of Sarawak (by seniority of assuming office; currently none)
4. Knights Grand Commander of the Most Exalted Order of the Star of Sarawak (S.B.S.; Pehin Sri):
  1. Mahathir Mohamad
5. Grand Commanders of the Order of the Defender of the Realm (S.M.N.; Tun) (Note: Already appears above as: 1. Governor (Wan Junaidi Tuanku Jaafar (2024)); 2. Knight Grand Commander of the Most Exalted Order of the Star of Sarawak (S.B.S.) (Mahathir Mohamad (2003))):
  1. Abdul Rahman Abbas (2001)
  2. Mohd Khalil Yaakob (2004)
  3. Juhar Mahiruddin (2011)
  4. Mohd. Ali Mohd. Rustam (2020)
  5. Ahmad Fuzi Abdul Razak (2021)
  6. Musa Aman (2024)
  7. Ramli Ngah Talib (2025)
6. Former premiers of Sarawak (by seniority of assuming office; currently none)
7. Knights Grand Commander of the Order of the Star of Hornbill Sarawak (D.P.; Datuk Patinggi) (Note: Abang Abdul Rahman Zohari Abang Openg (2017) already appears above as premier of Sarawak):
  1. Rosmiati Kendati (1988)
  2. Alfred Jabu Numpang (2004)
  3. George Chan Hong Nam (2005)
  4. Mohammad Najib Abdul Razak (2008)
  5. Mahiaddin Md. Yasin (2013)
  6. Raghad Waleed Al-kurdi (2015)
  7. Ahmad Zahid Hamidi (2016)
  8. Ismail Sabri Yaakob (2022)
  9. Fauziah Mohd Sanusi (2024)
  10. Leonard Linggi Jugah (2024)
8. Grand Commanders of the Order of Loyalty to the Crown of Malaysia (S.S.M.; Tun):
  1. Mohamed Eusoff Chin (1997)
  2. Siti Hasmah Mohamad Ali (2003)
  3. Ahmad Fairuz Abdul Halim (2005)
  4. Musa Hitam (2006)
  5. Jeanne Abdullah (2009)
  6. Zaki Azmi (2009)
  7. Arifin Zakaria (2012)
  8. Muhammad Raus Sharif (2017)
  9. Tengku Maimun Tuan Mat (2020)
  10. Richard Malanjum (2020)
  11. Raja Muhammad Alias Raja Muhammad Ali (2021)
  12. Wan Ahmad Farid Wan Salleh (2026)
9. Former acting governors of Sarawak and spouses/widows/widowers of former governors (by seniority of assuming office) (Note: Already appears above as: 1. Knights Grand Commander of the Order of the Star of Hornbill Sarawak (D.P.); 1. Rosmiati Kendati; 2. Raghad Waleed Al-kurdi):
  1. Hayati Ahmat (2 April 1981 – 1 April 1985)
10. Heads of state governments of Malaysia (by seniority of assuming office):
  1. Ahmad Samsuri Mokhtar (10 May 2018)
  2. Chow Kon Yeow (14 May 2018)
  3. Wan Rosdy Wan Ismail (15 May 2018)
  4. Amirudin Shari (19 June 2018)
  5. Muhammad Sanusi Md Nor (17 May 2020)
  6. Hajiji Noor (29 September 2020)
  7. Saarani Mohamad (10 December 2020)
  8. Onn Hafiz Ghazi (15 March 2022)
  9. Mohd Nassuruddin Daud (15 August 2023)
  10. Ab Rauf Yusoh (31 March 2023)
  11. Abu Bakar Hamzah (28 December 2025)
  12. Ismail Lasim (2 August 2026)
11. Chief Judge of Sabah and Sarawak (Azizah Nawawi)
12. Deputy Premiers of Sarawak (by seniority of assuming office):
  1. Douglas Uggah Embas (13 May 2016)
  2. Awang Tengah Ali Hasan (6 May 2017)
  3. Sim Kui Hian (4 January 2022)
13. President of the Senate of Malaysia (Awang Bemee Awang Ali Basah)
14. Speaker of the House of Representatives of Malaysia (Johari Abdul)
15. Speaker of the Sarawak State Legislative Assembly (Mohamad Asfia Awang Nassar)
16. Ministers of Malaysia (Note: Precedence is determined by the Prime Minister's Department) (Note: Ahmad Zahid Hamidi, current deputy prime minister I, already appears above as Knight Grand Commander of the Order of the Star of Hornbill Sarawak (D.P.))
  1. Prime Minister / Minister of Finance (Anwar Ibrahim)
  2. Deputy Prime Minister II / Minister of Energy Transition and Water Transformation (Fadillah Yusof)
  3. Minister of Transport (Anthony Loke Siew Fook)
  4. Minister of Agriculture and Food Security (Mohamad Sabu)
  5. Minister of Housing and Local Government (Nga Kor Ming)
  6. Minister of Foreign Affairs (Mohamad Hasan)
  7. Minister of Works (Alexander Nanta Linggi)
  8. Minister of Home Affairs (Saifuddin Nasution Ismail)
  9. Minister of Defence (Mohamed Khaled Nordin)
  10. Minister of Science, Technology and Innovation (Chang Lih Kang)
  11. Minister of Women, Family and Community Development (Nancy Shukri)
  12. Minister in the Prime Minister's Department (Law and Institutional Reform) (Azalina Othman Said)
  13. Minister of Higher Education (Zambry Abdul Kadir)
  14. Minister of Tourism, Arts and Culture (Tiong King Sing)
  15. Minister of Communications (Ahmad Fahmi Mohamed Fadzil)
  16. Minister of Education (Fadhlina Sidek)
  17. Minister of National Unity (Aaron Ago Dagang)
  18. Minister in the Prime Minister's Department (Federal Territories) (Hannah Yeoh Tseow Suan)
  19. Minister of Investment, Trade and Industry (Johari Abdul Ghani)
  20. Minister of Domestic Trade and Costs of Living (Armizan Mohd Ali)
  21. Minister of Digital (Gobind Singh Deo)
  22. Minister of Health (Dzulkefly Ahmad)
  23. Minister of Finance II (Amir Hamzah Azizan)
  24. Minister of Entrepreneur and Cooperatives Development (Malaysia) (Steven Sim Chee Keong)
  25. Minister of Plantation and Commodities (Noraini Ahmad)
  26. Minister of Natural Resources and Environmental Sustainability (Arthur Joseph Kurup)
  27. Minister of Human Resources (Ramanan Ramakrishnan)
  28. Minister of Economy (Akmal Nasrullah Mohd Nasir)
  29. Minister in the Prime Minister's Department (Sabah and Sarawak Affairs) (Mustapha Sakmud)
  30. Minister in the Prime Minister's Department (Religious Affairs) (Zulkifli Hasan)
  31. Minister of Youth and Sports (Mohammed Taufiq Johari)
17. Ministers of Sarawak (Note: Already appears above as: 1. Premier; 1. Abang Abdul Rahman Zohari Abang Openg; 2. Deputy premiers; 1. Awang Tengah Ali Hasan; 2. Douglas Uggah Embas; 3. Sim Kui Hian)
  1. Minister for Women, Early Childhood and Community Wellbeing Development (Fatimah Abdullah)
  2. Minister for Food Industry, Commodity and Regional Development (Stephen Rundi Utom)
  3. Minister for Tourism, Creative Industry and Performing Arts / Minister for Youth, Sports and Entrepreneur Development (Abdul Karim Rahman Hamzah)
  4. Minister for Transport (Lee Kim Shin)
  5. Minister in the Premier's Department (John Sikie Tayai)
  6. Minister for Utility and Telecommunication (Julaihi Narawi)
  7. Minister for Education, Innovation and Talent Development (Roland Sagah Wee Inn)
18. Sarawak State Secretary (Mohamad Abu Bakar Marzuki)
19. Deputy Ministers of Malaysia
20. Deputy Ministers of Sarawak
21. Chiefs of Consular Missions
  1. Xing Weiping (22 June 2022)
  2. Sheikh Abdul Mahdani Sheikh Abdul Ghani (July 2024)
  3. Abdullah Zulkifli (27 September 2025)
22. Commanders of the Order of the Defender of the Realm (P.M.N.; Tan Sri) (Note: Already appears above as: 1. Premier; 1. Abang Abdul Rahman Zohari Abang Openg (2021); 2. Grand Commanders of the Order of Loyalty to the Crown of Malaysia (S.S.M.); 1. Musa Hitam (1994); 2. Muhammad Raus Sharif (2012); 3. Tengku Maimun Tuan Mat (2019)):
  1. Borhan Ahmad (1994)
  2. Abdul Rahim Mohd Noor (1995)
  3. Ismail Omar (1995)
  4. Abdul Halim Ali (1997)
  5. Mohd Zahidi Zainuddin (2001)
  6. Norian Mai (2001)
  7. Samsudin Osman (2001)
  8. Abdul Gani Patail (2005)
  9. Mohd Anwar Mohd Nor (2005)
  10. Abdul Aziz Zainal (2007)
  11. Mohd Sidek Hassan (2007)
  12. Musa Hassan (2007)
  13. Rafidah Aziz (2008)
  14. Alauddin Mohd Sheriff (2009)
  15. Ong Ka Ting (2009)
  16. Syed Hamid Albar (2009)
  17. Azizan Ariffin (2010)
  18. Joseph Pairin Kitingan (2010)
  19. Ismail Omar (2011)
  20. Harris Salleh (2011)
  21. Zulkifeli Mohd Zin (2012)
  22. Ali Hamsa (2013)
  23. Khalid Abu Bakar (2014)
  24. Mohamed Apandi Ali (2016)
  25. Mohamad Fuzi Harun (2017)
  26. Raja Mohamed Affandi Raja Mohamed Noor (2017)
  27. Zulkefli Ahmad Makinudin (2017)
  28. Ismail Bakar (2019)
  29. Zulkifli Zainal Abidin (2019)
  30. Abdul Hamid Bador (2020)
  31. Affendi Buang (2020)
  32. Idrus Azizan Harun (2020)
  33. Mohd Zuki Ali (2020)
  34. Acryl Sani Abdullah Sani (2021)
  35. Mohammad Ab Rahman (2024)
  36. Razarudin Husain (2024)
  37. Shamsul Azri Abu Bakar (2024)
  38. Mohd Dusuki Mokhtar (2025)
  39. Mohd Nizam Jaffar (2025)
23. Knights Commander of the Order of the Star of Hornbill Sarawak (D.A.; Datuk Amar) (Note: Already appears above as: 1. Premier (Abang Abdul Rahman Zohari Abang Openg (2008)); 2. Knights Grand Commander of the Order of the Star of Hornbill Sarawak (D.P.); 1. Leonard Linggi Jugah (1987); 2. Alfred Jabu Numpang (1989); 3. George Chan Hong Nam (1998); 3. Grand Commanders of the Order of Loyalty to the Crown of Malaysia (S.S.M.): 1. Jeanne Abdullah (2008); 2. Muhammad Raus Sharif (2016); 4. Deputy premiers: 1. Awang Tengah Ali Hasan (2008); 2. Douglas Uggah Embas (2013); 3. Sim Kui Hian (2023); 5. Sarawak State Legislative Assembly Speaker (Mohamad Asfia Awang Nassar (2011)); 6. Sarawak State Secretary (Mohamad Abu Bakar Marzuki (2022)); 7. Commander of the Order of the Defender of the Realm (P.M.N.): 1. Mohd Zuki Ali (2020))
  1. Hamid Bugo (1993)
  2. Leo Moggie Irok (1999)
  3. Osu Sukam (1999)
  4. Abdul Aziz Husain (2001)
  5. Steve Shim Lip Kiong (2002)
  6. Wilson Baya Dandot (2007)
  7. Mohamad Morshidi Abdul Ghani (2009)
  8. Rosmah Mansor (2010)
  9. Abdul Hamed Sepawi (2012)
  10. Yaw Teck Seng (2014)
  11. Jamilah Anu (2016)
  12. Jaul Samion (2019)
  13. Ahmad Tarmizi Sulaiman (2019)
  14. Michael Manyin Jawong (2020)
  15. Mohammad Ali Mahmud (2020)
  16. Abang Iskandar Abang Hashim (2022)
24. Commanders of the Order of Loyalty to the Crown of Malaysia (P.S.M.; Tan Sri) (Note: Already appears above as: 1. Speaker of the House of Representatives of Malaysia (Johari Abdul (2023)); 2. Commanders of the Order of the Defender of the Realm (P.M.N.); 1. Abdul Rahim Mohd Noor (1990); 2. Borhan Ahmad (1993); 3. Norian Mai (1998); 4. Mohd Zahidi Zainuddin (1999); 5. Samsudin Osman (1999); 6. Abdul Gani Patail (2003); 7. Abdul Aziz Zainal (2006); 8. Mohd Sidek Hassan (2006); 9. Musa Hassan (2006); 10. Azizan Ariffin (2007); 11. Ismail Omar (2008); 12. Zulkefli Ahmad Makinudin (2010); 13. Zulkifeli Mohd Zin (2011); 14. Khalid Abu Bakar (2012); 15. Zulkifli Zainal Abidin (2012); 16. Raja Mohamed Affandi Raja Mohamed Noor (2014); 17. Affendi Buang (2017); 18. Abdul Hamid Bador (2019); 3. Knights Commander of the Order of the Star of Hornbill Sarawak (D.A.) (Note: Already appears above as: 1. Commander of the Order of the Defender of the Realm (P.M.N.) (Harris Salleh (1980))); 1. Hamid Bugo (1998); 2. Steve Shim Lip Kiong (2001); 3. Leo Moggie Irok (2005); 4. Abdul Aziz Husain (2007); 5. Yaw Teck Seng (2010); 6. Wilson Baya Dandot (2014); 7. Abang Iskandar Abang Hashim (2021); 8. Osu Sukam (2022))
25. Secretary of the House of Representatives of Malaysia (Nizam Mydin Bacha Mydin)
26. Attorney-General of Sarawak (Saferi Ali)
27. Sarawak State Financial Secretary (Wan Lizozman Wan Omar)
28. Deputy Sarawak State Secretaries
  1. Muhammad Abdullah Zaidel (July 2022)
  2. Hii Chang Kee (3 January 2023)
  3. Felicia Tan Ya Hua (6 January 2026)
29. Commander of Naval Region 2 (Ivan Mario Andrew)
30. Sarawak Police Commissioner (Mohamad Zainal Abdullah)
31. President of the Sarawak Islamic Council (Misnu Taha)
32. Sarawak State Mufti (Khalidi Ibrahim)
33. Mayors of City Councils of Sarawak
  1. Kuching South City Council (Wee Hong Seng)
  2. Kuching North City Hall (Hilmy Othman)
  3. Miri City Council (Adam Yii Siew Sang)
34. Knights Commander of the Most Exalted Order of the Star of Sarawak (P.N.B.S.; Dato Sri)
35. Commanders of the Order of Meritorious Service (P.J.N.; Datuk)
36. Commanders of the Order of the Star of Hornbill Sarawak (P.G.B.K.; Datuk)
37. Recipients of orders of chivalry from states and federal territories of Malaysia (other than Sarawak) carrying the title Datuk
38. Recipients of the Order of Meritorious Service to Sarawak (D.J.B.S.; Datu)
39. Commanders of the Most Exalted Order of the Star of Sarawak (P.S.B.S.; Dato)
40. Senators of Malaysia
41. Members of the House of Representatives of Malaysia
42. Members of the Sarawak State Legislative Assembly
43. Chairman of the Sarawak Civil Service Commission (Kameri Affandi)
44. Honorary foreign consuls (Note: Already appears above as: 1. Knights Commander of the Order of the Star of Hornbill Sarawak (D.A.): 1. Estonia (Mohamad Morshidi Abdul Ghani (2017)); 2. New Zealand (Hamid Bugo (1 July 2024)); 2. Commander of the Order of the Star of Hornbill Sarawak (P.G.B.K.); 1. Australia (Philip Ting Ding Ing) (1 June 1989))
  1. Denmark (Aw Tai Hui) (4 June 1992)
  2. Poland (Raziah Mahmud-Geneid) (12 June 2000)
  3. France (Audry Wan Ullok) (11 June 2013)
45. Resident of Kuching Division (Dayang Hajah Joanita Azizah Abang Haji Morshidi)
46. Vice-chancellor of Universiti Malaysia Sarawak (Ahmad Hata Rasit)
47. Chairpersons of Municipal Councils of Sarawak
  1. Bintulu Development Authority (Muhamad Yakup Kari)
  2. Sibu Municipal Council (Clarence Ting Ing Horh)
  3. Padawan Municipal Council (Tan Kai)
  4. Kota Samarahan Municipal Council (Abang Ismawi Abang Ali)
48. Deputy Sarawak State Financial Secretary (Hasmawati Sapawi)
49. Deputy Attorney-General of Sarawak (John Wayne Chamberlin Sirau)
50. Permanent secretaries of Sarawak Ministries
51. Residents of Sarawak Divisions (other than Kuching):
  1. Sri Aman (Mahra Salleh)
  2. Sibu (Superi Awang Said)
  3. Miri (Galong Luang)
  4. Limbang (Unus Tambi)
  5. Sarikei (Michael Ronnie Langgong)
  6. Kapit (Elvis Didit)
  7. Bintulu (Nyurak Keti)
  8. Samarahan (Mohamad Irwan Bahari Bujang)
  9. Mukah (Bujang Rahman Seli)
  10. Betong (Richard Michael Abunawas)
  11. Serian (Mackos Sibong)
52. Deputy vice-chancellors of Universiti Malaysia Sarawak
  1. Al-Khalid Haji Othman
  2. Siti Noor Linda Taib
53. Directors of public higher education institutions in Sarawak
54. Chairpersons of statutory boards and corporations
55. Deputy Sarawak Police Commissioner (Saifullizan Ishak)
56. Commander of the 1st Infantry Division (Mohd Sobirin Mohd Yusof)
57. Commander of Air Region 2 (Norli Hisham Alwi)
58. Heads of government departments and general managers of government-linked corporations
59. Political secretaries

== See also ==
- List of post-nominal letters (Sarawak)
