= List of post-nominal letters in Malaysia by alphabetical order =

This list of post-nominal letters used throughout Malaysia is compiled from the individual post-nominal letters pages. The order in which they follow an individual's name is the same as the order of precedence for the wearing of order insignias, decorations, and medals. When applicable, non-hereditary titles are indicated.

== A ==
Post-nominal	Grade	Order	Prefix	Country / state
Orders and supreme military medals
AAP	Member	The Most Illustrious Order of Sultan Ahmad Shah of Pahang (Ahli Ahmad Shah Pahang)	--	Pahang
ABK	Member	Order of the Star of Hornbill Sarawak (Ahli Bintang Kenyalang)	--	Sarawak
ABS	Member	The Most Exalted Order of the Star of Sarawak (Ahli Bintang Sarawak)	--	Sarawak
ACM	Member	The Most Illustrious Order of Cura Si Manja Kini (the Perak Sword of State - Ahli Cura Si Manja Kini)	--	Perak
ADK	Member	Order of Kinabalu (Ahli Darjah Kinabalu)	--	Sabah
AGK	Member	The Glorious Order of the Crown of Kedah (Ahli Gemilang Mahkota Kedah)	--	Kedah
AIS	Member	Order of Sultan Sharafuddin Idris Shah (Ahli Sultan Sharafuddin Idris Shah)	--	Selangor
AK	Silver Medal	Medal of Kelantan (Ahli Kelantan)	--	Kelantan
AMK	Member	The Exalted Order of the Crown of Kedah (Ahli Mahkota Kedah)	--	Kedah
AMN	Member	Order of the Defender of the Realm (Ahli Mangku Negara)		Malaysia
AMP	Member	The Esteemed Order of the Crown of Pahang (Ahli Mahkota Pahang)	--	Pahang
AMP	Member	The Most Illustrious Order of the Perak State Crown (Ahli Mahkota Perak)	--	Perak
AMP	Member	The Most Illustrious Order of the Crown of Perlis, the Star of Safi (Ahli Mahkota Perlis)	--	Perlis
AMS	Member	The Most Illustrious Order of the Crown of Selangor (Ahli Mahkota Selangor)	--	Selangor
AMT	Member	The Most Distinguished Order of the Crown of Terengganu (Ahli Mahkota Terengganu)	--	Terengganu
AMW	Member	Order of the Territorial Crown (Ahli Mahkota Wilayah)	--	(Federal Territories of Malaysia) Federal Territory (Malaysia)
AMZ	Member	The Most Select Order of Sultan Mizan Zainal Abidin of Terengganu (Ahli Sultan Mizan Zainal Abidin)	--	Terengganu
ANS	Member	The Most Esteemed Order of Loyalty to Negeri Sembilan (Pingat Ahli Negeri Sembilan)	--	Negeri Sembilan
ASA	Member	Order of Sultan Salahuddin Abdul Aziz Shah (Ahli Sultan Salahuddin Abdul Aziz Shah)	--	Selangor
ASDK	Companion	Order of Kinabalu (Ahli Setia Darjah Kinabalu)	--	Sabah
ASJ	Member	The Jerai Medal for Excellent Vigour (Ahli Pingat Cemerlang SemanSemangat Jerai)	--	Kedah
ASK	Member	Order of the Loyalty to the Crown of Kelantan - Al-Ibrahimi Star (Ahli Setia Mahkota Kelantan)	--	Kelantan
ASM	Member Companion	The Most Revered Order of Sultan Mahmud I of Terengganu (Ahli Setia Sultan Mahmud I Terengganu)	--	Terengganu
ATS		The Most Valliant Order of Taming Sari (the Perak State Kris - Perajurit (Ahli) Taming Sari )	--	Perak

== B ==
Post-nominal	Grade	Order	Prefix	Country / state
Orders and supreme military medals
BBS	Herald	The Most Exalted Order of the Star of Sarawak (Bentara Bintang Sarawak)	--	Sarawak
BCK	Silver Star	The State of Kedah Distinguished Service Star (Bintang Perkhidmatan Yang Berbakti Negeri Kedah)	--	Kedah
BCM	Distinguished Service Star	Exalted Order of Malacca (Bintang Cemerlang Melaka)	--	Malacca
BCN		Distinguished Service Star (Bintang Cemerlang Negeri)	--	Penang
BGP		Supreme Gallantry Star (Bintang Gagah Persiran)	--	Malacca
BK	Medal	Order of Kinabalu (Bintang Kinabalu)	--	Sabah
BKH	Silver star	The Conspicuous Gallantry Star (Bintang Keberanian Handal)	--	Terengganu
BKK	Bronze star	The Kedah Star of Valour (Bintang Keberanian Negeri Kedah)	---	Kedah
BKM	Silver Star	The Public Service Star (Bintang Kebaktian Masyarakat)	--	Kedah
BKT		Distinguished Service Star (Bintang Kelakuan Terpuji)	--	Malacca
BLB	Six-p. silver star	The Long Service and Good Conduct Star (Bintang Kerana Lama Berjawatan dan Baik Pekerti)	--	Terengganu
BMS	Star	Order of Loyalty to Sultan 'Abdu'l Halim Mu'azzam Shah (Bintang Setia Sultan Abdul Halim Muadzam Shah)	--	Kedah
BPC	Silver star	Distinguished Service Star (Bintang Perkhidmatan Cemerlang)	--	Selangor
BPK	Star	The Kedah Star of Gallantry (Bintang Perkasa Negeri Kedah)	--	Kedah
BPL	Silver Star	The Long Service and Good Conduct Star (Bintang Untuk Perkhidmatan Lama dan Kelakuan Baik)	--	Kedah
BSD	Herald	Order of Royal Household (Bentara Setia Diraja)		Malaysia
BSJ	Silver Star	The Jerai Star for Vigour (Bintang Semangat Jerai)	--	Kedah
BSK	Officer	Order of the Loyalty to the Crown of Kelantan - Al-Ibrahimi Star (Bentara Setia Mahkota Kelantan)	--	Kelantan
BSK	Grand Medal	Order of Kinabalu (Bintang Seri Kinabalu)	--	Sabah
BTM	Heraldic Medal	The Order of Loyalty to Tuanku Muhriz (Pingat Bentara Tuanku Muhriz)	--	Negeri Sembilan

== D ==
Post-nominal	Grade	Order	Prefix	Country / state
Orders and supreme military medals
DA	Knight Commander	Order of the Star of Hornbill Sarawak (Datuk Amar Bintang Kenyalang)	Datuk Amar	Sarawak
DB	1 Class Order (Darjah)	Order of Merit of Malaysia (Darjah Bakti)	--	Malaysia
DBNS	Knight	The Order of Loyal Service to Negeri Sembilan (Dato’ Bakti Negeri Sembilan)	Dato’	Negeri Sembilan
DBSJ	--	The Order of Dato Bendahara Sri Jamalullail (Dato’ Bendahara Sri Jamalullail)	Dato’ Sri Diraja Bendahara Negara	Perlis
DCSM	Knight Commander	Exalted Order of Malacca (Darjah Cemerlang Seri Melaka)	--	Malacca
DGMK	Knight Commander	The Glorious Order of the Crown of Kedah (Dato’ Wira Gemilang Mahkota Kedah)	Dato’ Wira	Kedah
DGPN	Commander	Order of the Defender of State (Darjah Gemilang Pangkuan Negeri)	Dato’ Seri	Penang
DGSM	Grand Commander	Exalted Order of Malacca (Darjah Gemilang Seri Melaka)	--	Malacca
DHMS	Knight Commander	Order of Loyalty to Sultan Abdul Halim Mu'adzam Shah (Datuk Sri Paduka Sultan Abdul Halim Mu'azzam Shah)	Dato’ Paduka	Kedah
DIMP	Knight Companion	The Esteemed Order of the Crown of Pahang (Darjah Indera Mahkota Pahang)	Datuk	Pahang
DJBS		Order of Meritorious Service to Sarawak - Darjah Jasa Bakti Sarawak	Datu	Sarawak
DJMK	Knight Commander	Order of the Life of the Crown of Kelantan - Al-Ismaili Star (Dato’ Paduka Jiwa Mahkota Kelantan)	Dato’	Kelantan
DJN	Member	Order of the Defender of State (Darjah Johan Negeri)	--	Penang
DK	Member	The Most Illustrious Royal Family Order of Kedah (Darjah Kerabat Y.A.M. Kedah)	--	Kedah
DK	Star	The Most Esteemed Royal Family Order (Kelantan) - Al-Yunusi Star (Darjah Kerabat - Bintang al-Yunusi)	--	Kelantan
DK	Member (Ahli)	The Most Esteemed Royal Family Order of Perak (Darjah Kerabat Diraja Yang Amat Dihormati)	--	Perak
DK	--	The Most Esteemed Perlis Family Order of the Gallant Prince Syed Putra Jamalullail (Darjah Kerabat Perlis)	--	Perlis
DK I	Grand Commander	Royal Family Order of Johor (Darjah Kerabat I)	--	Johor
DK I	First Class Member	The Most Esteemed Family Order of the Crown of Indra of Pahang (Darjah Kerabat Sri Indra Mahkota Pahang Yang Amat di-Hormati)	--	Pahang
DK I	First Class	The Most Esteemed Royal Family Order of Selangor (Darjah Kerabat Selangor Pertama)	--	Selangor
DK I	First class Member	The Most Distinguished Family Order of Terengganu (Darjah Kebesaran Kerabat Terengganu - Ahli Yang Pertama)	--	Terengganu
DK II	Commander	Royal Family Order of Johor (Darjah Kerabat II)	--	Johor
DK II	Second Class Member	The Most Esteemed Family Order of the Crown of Indra of Pahang (Darjah Kebesaran Mahkota Pahang Yang Amat di-Hormati)	--	Pahang
DK II	Second Class	The Most Esteemed Royal Family Order of Selangor (Darjah Kerabat Selangor Kedua)	--	Selangor
DK II	Second Class Member	The Most Distinguished Family Order of Terengganu (Darjah Kebesaran Kerabat Terengganu - Ahli Yang Kedua)	--	Terengganu
DKH	Member	The Most Illustrious Halimi Family Order of Kedah (Darjah Kerabat Halimi Y.A.M. Kedah)	--	Kedah
DKM	1 Class Order (Darjah)	Royal Family Order of Malaysia (Darjah Kerabat Diraja Malaysia)	--	Malaysia
DKNS		The Most Illustrious Royal Family Order of Negeri Sembilan (Darjah Kerabat Negeri Sembilan)	--	Negeri Sembilan
DKP	Member or Ahli	The Most Illustrious Royal Family Order of Pahang (Darjah Kerabat Pahang)	--	Pahang
DKP	--	The Most Esteemed Royal Family Order of Perlis (Darjah Kerabat Diraja Perlis)	--	Perlis
DKR	Member	The Most Distinguished Royal Family Order of Terengganu (Darjah Kerabat Diraja Terengganu Yang Amat Mulia)	--	Terengganu
DKSA	Superior class	The Most Esteemed Perak Family Order of Sultan Azlan Shah (Darjah Kerabat Sultan Azlan Shah)	--	Perak
DKT	Member	The Most Exalted Supreme Royal Family Order of Terengganu (Darjah Utama Kerabat Diraja Terengganu Yang Amat Dihormati)	--	Terengganu
DKYR		The Royal Family Order of Yamtuan Radin Sunnah (Darjah Kerabat Yamtuan Radin Sunnah)	--	Negeri Sembilan
DMK	Member	Supreme Order of Sri Mahawangsa (Darjah Utama Sri Mahawangsa Kedah)	--	Kedah
DMN	1 Class Order (Darjah)	Order of the Crown of the Realm (Darjah Utama Seri Mahkota Negara)	--	Malaysia
DMNS	Illustrious	The Order of Negeri Sembilan (Darjah Mulia Negeri Sembilan)	--	Negeri Sembilan
DMPN	Companion	Order of the Defender of State (Darjah Yang Mulia Pangkuan Negeri)	Dato’	Penang
DMSM	Companion	Exalted Order of Malacca (Darjah Mulia Seri Melaka)	--	Malacca
DNS	Companion	The Most Esteemed Order of Loyalty to Negeri Sembilan (Darjah Setia Negeri Sembilan)	--	Negeri Sembilan
DP	Knight Grand Commander	Order of the Star of Hornbill Sarawak (Datuk Patinggi Bintang Kenyalang)	Datuk Patinggi	Sarawak
DPCM	Knight	The Most Illustrious Order of Cura Si Manja Kini (the Perak Sword of State - Datuk Paduka Cura Si Manja Kini)	Dato’	Perak
DPKK	Knight Commander	The Most Valiant Order of the Noble Crown of Kelantan - Al-Yahyawi Star (Dato’ Paduka Kebesaran Kshatria Mahkota Kelantan)	Dato’	Kelantan
DPMJ	Grand Commander	Order of the Crown of Johor (Dato’ Paduka Mahkota Johor)	Dato’	Johor
DPMK	Knight Commander	The Exalted Order of the Crown of Kedah (Dato’ Paduka Mahkota Kedah)	Dato’	Kedah
DPMK	Knight Commander	Order of the Crown of Kelantan - Al-Muhammadi Star (Dato’ Paduka Mahkota Kelantan)	Dato’	Kelantan
DPMP	Knight Commander	The Most Illustrious Order of the Perak State Crown (Datuk Paduka Mahkota Perak)	Dato’	Perak
DPMP	Knight Commander	The Most Illustrious Order of the Crown of Perlis, the Star of Safi (Dato’ Paduka Mahkota Perlis)	Dato’	Perlis
DPMS	Knight Commander	The Most Illustrious Order of the Crown of Selangor (Dato’ Paduka Mahkota Selangor)	Dato’	Selangor
DPMT	Knight Commander	The Most Distinguished Order of the Crown of Terengganu (Dato’ Paduka Mahkota Terengganu)	Dato’	Terengganu
DPNS (ex-DSNS)	Knight Commander (ex- Knight Companion)	The Most Esteemed Order of Loyalty to Negeri Sembilan (Dato’ Paduka Negeri Sembilan, ex-Dato’ Setia)	--	Negeri Sembilan
DPPJ	Knight Commander	The Most Esteemed Order of the Gallant Prince Syed Putra Jamalullail (Dato’ Paduka Putra Jamalullail)	Dato’	Perlis
DPPN	Knight Commander	Order of the Defender of State (Darjah Panglima Pangkuan Negera)	Dato’ Seri	Penang
DPSJ	Knight Commander	The Order of Prince Syed Sirajuddin Jamalullail of Perlis (Dato’ Panglima Sirajuddin Jamalullail Perlis)	Dato’	Perlis
DPSK	Knight Commander	Order of the Loyalty to the Crown of Kelantan - Al-Ibrahimi Star (Dato’ Paduka Setia Mahkota Kelantan)	Dato’	Kelantan
DPT	Single class Order	The Distinguished Conduct Order (Darjah Pekerti Terpilih)	--	Negeri Sembilan
DPTJ	Knight Commander	The Most Blessed Grand Order of Tuanku Ja’afar (Dato’ Paduka Tuanku Ja’afar)	Dato’	Negeri Sembilan
DPTS	Knight Commander	The Most Valliant Order of Taming Sari (the Perak State Kris - Datuk Pahlawan Taming Sari )	Dato’	Perak
DSAP	Knight Companion	The Most Illustrious Order of Sultan Ahmad Shah of Pahang (Darjah Sultan Ahmad Shah Pahang)	Datuk	Pahang
DSDK	Knight Companion	The Illustrious Order of Loyalty to the Royal House of Kedah (Dato’ Setia Diraja Kedah)	Dato’	Kedah
DSIJ	Knight Commander	Order of the Loyalty of Sultan Ismail (Johor) (Dato’ Setia Sultan Ismail Johor)	Dato’	Johor
DSIS	Knight Companion	Order of Sultan Sharafuddin Idris Shah (Dato’ Setia Sultan Sharafuddin Idris Shah)	Dato’	Selangor
DSM	Member	Exalted Order of Malacca (Darjah Seri Melaka)	--	Malacca
DSMT	Member Knight Companion	The Most Revered Order of Sultan Mahmud I of Terengganu (Ahli Dato’ Setia Sultan Mahmud I Terengganu)	--	Terengganu
DSMZ	Knight Companion	The Most Select Order of Sultan Mizan Zainal Abidin of Terengganu (Dato’ Setia Sultan Mizan Zainal Abidin)	Dato’	Terengganu
DSPJ	Knight Commander	The Most Esteemed Order of the Gallant Prince Syed Sirajuddin Jamalullail (Dato’ Setia Panglima Sirajuddin Jamalullail)	Dato’	Perlis
DSPJ	Knight Companion	The Most Esteemed Order of the Gallant Prince Syed Putra Jamalullail (Dato’ Setia Putra Jamal ul-Lail)	Dato’	Perlis
DSPN	Officer	Order of the Defender of State (Darjah Setia Mulia Pangkuan Negeri)	Dato’	Penang
DSSA	Knight Companion	Order of Sultan Salahuddin Abdul Aziz Shah (Dato’ Setia Sultan Salahuddin Abdul Aziz Shah)	--	Selangor
DSSJ	Knight Companion	The Most Esteemed Order of the Gallant Prince Syed Sirajuddin Jamalullail (Dato’ Setia Sirajuddin Jamalullail)	Dato’ Paduka	Perlis
DSTM	Knight	The Order of Loyalty to Tuanku Muhriz (Darjah Setia Tuanku Muhriz Yang Amat Terbilang)	Dato’	Negeri Sembilan
DTM	Companion	The Order of Loyalty to Tuanku Muhriz (Darjah Tuanku Muhriz)	--	Negeri Sembilan
DTNS	Paramount	The Order of Negeri Sembilan (Darjah Tertinggi Negeri Sembilan)	--	Negeri Sembilan
DUK	Member	The Kedah Supreme Order of Merit (Darjah Utama Untok Jasa Kedah)	--	Kedah
DUNM	Grand Commander	Premier and Exalted Order of Malacca (Darjah Utama Negeri Melaka)	--	Malacca
DUPN	Knight Grand Commander	Order of the Defender of State (Darjah Utama Pangkuan Negeri)	Dato’ Seri Utama	Penang
DWSJ	Grand Hero	The Order of Prince Syed Sirajuddin Jamalullail of Perlis (Dato’ Wira Sirajuddin Jamalullail Perlis)	Dato’ Wira	Perlis

== G ==
Post-nominal	Grade	Order	Prefix	Country / state
Orders and supreme military medals
GMK	Companion	The Glorious Order of the Crown of Kedah (Setia Gemilang Mahkota Kedah)	--	Kedah

== H ==
Post-nominal	Grade	Order	Prefix	Country / state
Orders and supreme military medals
HTS		The Most Valliant Order of Taming Sari (the Perak State Kris - Hulubalang Taming Sari )	--	Perak

== J ==
Post-nominal	Grade	Order	Prefix	Country / state
Orders and supreme military medals
JBK	Companion	Order of the Star of Hornbill Sarawak (Johan Bintang Kenyalang)	--	Sarawak
JBS	Companion	The Most Exalted Order of the Star of Sarawak (Johan Bintang Sarawak)	---	Sarawak
JMK	Companion	Order of the Life of the Crown of Kelantan - Al-Ismaili Star (Setia Jiwa Mahkota Kelantan)	--	Kelantan
JMN	Companion	Order of the Defender of the Realm (Johan Mangku)		Malaysia
JMW	Commander	Order of the Territorial Crown (Johan Mahkota Wilayah)	--	(Federal Territories of Malaysia) Federal Territory (Malaysia)
JP	Decoration	The Justice of Peace (Jaksa Pendamai Kedah)	--	Kedah
JP		Justice of the Peace (Jaksa Pendamai)	--	Malacca
JP	Decoration	Justice of Peace (Jaksa Pendamai)	--	Negeri Sembilan
JP	Decoration	Justice of Peace Decoration (Jaksa Pendamai)	--	Pahang
JP	Decoration	Justice of Peace (Tauliah Jaksa Pendamai)	--	Perak
JP	Decoration	Justice of the Peace (Watikah Pelantikan Jaksa Pendamai)	--	Selangor
JPC	Companion	Civil Administration Medal (Johan Perkhidmatan Cemerlang)	--	Sarawak
JSD	Companion	Order of the Royal Household (Johan Setia Diraja)		Malaysia
JSM	Companion	Order of Loyalty to the Crown of Malaysia (Johan Setia Mahkota Malaysia)		Malaysia

== K ==
Post-nominal	Grade	Order	Prefix	Country / state
Orders and supreme military medals
KMW	Officer	Order of the Territorial Crown (Kesatria Mahkota Wilayah)	--	(Federal Territories of Malaysia) Federal Territory (Malaysia)
KMN	Officer	Order of the Defender of the Realm (Kesatria Mangku)		Malaysia
KSD	Officer	Order of the Royal Household (Kesatria Setia Diraja)		Malaysia
KTS		The Most Valliant Order of Taming Sari (the Perak State Kris - Kshatriya Taming Sari)	--	Perak

== P ==
Post-nominal	Grade	Order	Prefix	Country / state
Orders and supreme military medals
PABS	Medal	Sultan Abu Bakar Coronation Medal (Pingat Kemahkotaan Sultan Abu Bakar)	--	Johor
PB	Silver Medal	Medal of Honour (Pingat Bakti)	--	Kelantan
PBI	Medal 1st Class	Iron Medal for Valour and Meritorious Conduct (Pingat Besi I)	--	Johor
PBII	Medal 2nd Class	Iron Medal for Valour and Meritorious Conduct (Pingat Besi II)	--	Johor
PBK	Officer	Order of the Star of Hornbill Sarawak (Pegawai Bintang Kenyalang)	--	Sarawak
PBM		Government Service Medal (Pingat Bakti Masyarakat)	--	Malacca
PBS		Loyal Service Medal (Pingat Bakti Setia)	--	Penang
PBS	Officer	The Most Exalted Order of the Star of Sarawak (Pegawai Bintang Sarawak)	--	Sarawak
PCK	Silver Medal	The State of Kedah Distinguished Service Medal (Pingat Perkhidmatan Yang Berbakti Negeri Kedah)	--	Kedah
PCM	Commander	The Most Illustrious Order of Cura Si Manja Kini (the Perak Sword of State -Paduka Cura Si Manja Kini)	--	Perak
PGBK	Grand Commander	Order of the Star of Hornbill Sarawak (Panglima Gemilang Bintang Kenyalang)	Datuk	Sarawak
PGDK	Commander	Order of Kinabalu (Panglima Gemilang Darjah Kinabalu)	Datuk	Sabah
PGP	Silver medal	The Gallantry Medal (Pingat Gagah Pewira)	--	Pahang
PGP		Conspicuous Gallantry Medal (Pingat Gagah Pewira)	--	Penang
PJB	Bronze medal	The Meritorious Conduct Medal (Pingat Jasa Baik)	--	Perlis
PJC	Silver medal	The Distinguished Service Medal (Pingat Jasa Cemerlang)	--	Terengganu
PJC	Gold Medal	Royal Education Award (Pingat Jaya Cemerlang)	--	Malaysia
PJK	Silver Medal	The Meritorious Service Medal (Pingat Perkhidmatan Yang Jasa Kebaktian)	--	Kedah
PJK	Silver medal	Meritorious Service Medal (Pingat Jasa Kebaktian)	--	Malacca
PJK	Bronze medal	The Meritorious Service Medal (Pingat Jasa Kebaktian)	--	Negeri Sembilan
PJK	Bronze medal	The Meritorious Service Medal (Pingat Jasa Kebaktian)	--	Pahang
PJK	Silver medal	The Meritorious Service Medal (Pingat Jasa Kebaktian)	--	Penang
PJK	Bronze medal	The Meritorious Service Medal (Pingat Jasa Kebaktian)	--	Perak
PJK	Bronze medal	The Meritorious Service Medal (Pingat Jasa Kebaktian)	--	Perlis
PJK	Silver medal	Meritorious Service Medal (Pingat Jasa Kebaktian)	--	Selangor
PJK	Bronze medal	The Meritorious Service Medal (Pingat Jasa Kebaktian)	--	Terengganu
PJM	Bronze medal	Community Service Medal (Pingat Jasa Masyarakat)	--	Penang
PJN	Commander	Order of Meritorious Service (Panglima Jasa Negara)	Datuk	Malaysia
PJP	Medal	Meritorious Service Medal (Pingat Lama Dan Baik Dalam Pekerjaan)	--	Johor
PJP	Silver Medal	Silver Jubilee Medal (Pingat Jubli Perak - reign of Sultan Ismail Petra)	--	Kelantan
PJP	Silver medal	Silver Jubilee Medal (Pingat Jubilee Perak Pahang)	--	Pahang
PJPS		Sarawak Heroes Service Medal (Pingat Jasa Pahlawan Sarawak)	--	Sarawak
PKC	Silver medal	The Conspicuous Gallantry Medal (Pingat Keberanian Cermerlang)	--	Negeri Sembilan
PKC	Silver medal	The Distinguished Service Medal (Pingat Khidmat Cemerlang)	--	Pahang
PKH	Star	The Conspicuous Gallantry Medal (Pingat Keberanian Handal)	--	Perak
PKH	Silver Medal	The Conspicuous Gallantry Medal (Pingat Keberanian Handal)	--	Perlis
PKH	Silver star	The Conspicuous Gallantry Medal (Pingat Keberanian Handal)	--	Terengganu
PKK	Commander	The Most Valiant Order of the Noble Crown of Kelantan - Al-Yahyawi Star (Paduka Kebesaran Kshatria Mahkota Kelantan)	--	Kelantan
PKL		Long Service Medal (Pingat Khidmat Lama)	--	Malacca
PKL	Bronze medal	The Long Service Medal (Pingat Khidmat Lama)	--	Negeri Sembilan
PKP	Medal	Meritorious Service Medal (Pingat Kebaktian Perkhidmatan)	--	Kelantan
PKT	Bronze medal	The Distinguished Conduct Medal (Pingat Kelakuan Terpuji)	--	Pahang
PKT	Gold medal	Distinguished Conduct Medal (Pingat Kelakuan Terpuji)	--	Penang
PKT	Silver medal	The Conspicuous Gallantry Medal (Pingat Keberanian Yang Terbilang)	--	Selangor
PLB	Medal in white metal	The Long Service and Good Conduct Medal (Pingat Kerana Lama Berjawatan dan Baik Pekerti)	--	Terengganu
PLP	Medal	Long Service Medal (Pingat Lama Dan Baik Dalam Pekerjaan)	--	Johor
PLP	Silver Medal	The Kedah Police Medal (Pingat Perkhidmatan Lama Polis, Obsolete 1952.)	--	Kedah
PLP	Bronze medal	The Long Service Medal (Pingat Lama Perkhidmatan)	--	Perak
PMC	Bronze medal	The Medal for Outstanding Public Service (Pingat Khidmat Masyarakat Cermerlang)	--	Negeri Sembilan
PMK	Commander	Order of the Crown of Kelantan - Al-Muhammadi Star Paduka Mahkota Kelantan)	--	Kelantan
PMN	Commander	Order of the Defender of the Realm (Panglima Mangku)	Tan Sri	Malaysia
PMP	Commander	The Most Illustrious Order of the Perak State Crown (Paduka Mahkota Perak)	--	Perak
PMP	Silver medal	The Most Illustrious Order of the Crown of Perlis, the Star of Safi (Pingat Mahkota Perlis)	--	Perlis
PMW	Knight Commander	Order of the Territorial Crown (Panglima Mahkota Wilayah)	Datuk	(Federal Territories of Malaysia) Federal Territory (Malaysia)
PNBS	Grand Commander	The Most Exalted Order of the Star of Sarawak (Panglima Negara Bintang Sarawak)	Dato Sri	Sarawak
PPB		Exceptional Service Medal (Pingat Perkhidmatan Luar Biasa)	--	Pahang
PPB	Medal	Meritorious Service Medal - Silver (Pingat Perkhidmatan Bakti (Perak))	--	Sarawak
PPB	Silver Medal	Good Conduct Medal (Pingat Perangai Baik)	--	Kelantan
PPC	Medal	Distinguished Service Medal - Gold (Pingat Perkhidmatan Cemerlang (Emas))	--	Sarawak
PPC	Silver medal	Distinguished Service Medal (Pingat Perkhidmatan Cemerlang)	--	Selangor
PPD	Silver Medal	State Council Opening Commemorative Medal 1939 (Pingat Peringatan Pembukaan Dewan)	--	Kelantan
PPI	Silver Medal	Sultan Ibrahim IV Coronation Medal (Pingat Pertabalan Sultan Ibrahim IV)	--	Kelantan
PPJP	Silver Medal	The Silver Jubilee Remembrance Medal (Pingat Peringatan Jubli Perak)	--	Kedah
PPK	Silver Medal	The State of Kedah Gallantry Medal (Pingat Untuk Perkasa Negeri Kedah)	--	Kedah
PPL	Silver Medal	The Long Service and Good Conduct Medal (Pingat Untuk Perkhidmatan Lama dan Kelakuan Baik)	--	Kedah
PPL	Silver medal	The Long Service Medal (Pingat Perkhidmatan Lama)	--	Perlis
PPN	Medal	Order of the Defender of the Realm (Pingat Pangkuan)		Malaysia
PPN (Emas)	Medal	Medal of the Defender of the State - Gold - Pingat Perwira Negeri (Emas)	--	Sarawak
PPN (Gangsa)	Medal	Medal of the Defender of the State - Bronze - Pingat Perwira Negeri (Gangsa)	--	Sarawak
PPN (Perak)	Medal	Medal of the Defender of the State - Silver - Pingat Perwira Negeri (Perak)	--	Sarawak
PPS	Silver medal	Selangor Service Medal (Pingat Perkhidmatan Selangor)	--	Selangor
PPT	Bronze medal	The Distinguished Conduct Medal (Pingat Pekerti Terpilih)	--	Negeri Sembilan
PPT	Bronze medal	The Distinguished Conduct Medal (Pingat Pekerti Terpilih)	--	Perak
PPT	Bronze medal	The Distinguished Conduct Medal (Pingat Pekerti Terpilih)	--	Perlis
PPT	Medal	Commendable Service Medal - Bronze (Pingat Perkhidmatan Terpuji (Gangsa))	--	Sarawak
PPT	Silver medal	Distinguished Conduct Medal (Pingat Pekerti Yang Terpilih)	--	Selangor
PPT	Nickel medal	The Distinguished Conduct Medal (Pingat Pekerti Terpilih)	--	Terengganu
PPTM		Installation Medal (Pingat Pertabalan Tuanku Muhriz)	--	Penang
PPW	Medal	Order of the Territorial Crown (Pingat Pangkuan Mahkota Wilayah)	--	(Federal Territories of Malaysia) Federal Territory (Malaysia)
PPY	Silver Medal	Sultan Yahya Petra Coronation Medal (Pingat Pertabalan Sultan Yahya Petra)	--	Kelantan
PS	Silver Medal	Medal of Loyalty to the Crown of Kelantan (Pingat Setia Mahkota Kelantan)	--	Kelantan
PSB	Silver Medal	The Sultan Badlishah Medal for Faithful and Loyal Service (Pingat Sultan Badlishah Kerana Ta'at Setia)	--	Kedah
PSBS	Commander	The Most Exalted Order of the Star of Sarawak (Panglima Setia Bintang Sarawak)	Dato’	Sarawak
PSD	Commander	Order of the Royal Household (Panglima Setia Diraja)	Datuk	Malaysia
PSI	Medal (Gold - Silver - Bronze)	Sultan Ibrahim Coronation Medal (Pingat Kemahkotaan Sultan Ibrahim)	--	Johor
PSK	Commander	Order of the Loyalty to the Crown of Kelantan - Al-Ibrahimi Star (Paduka Setia Mahkota Kelantan)	--	Kelantan
PSM	Commander	Order of Loyalty to the Crown of Malaysia (Panglima Setia Mahkota Malaysia)	Tan Sri	Malaysia
PSM	Medal	Public Service Medal	--	Papua New Guinea
PT	Silver Medal	Medal of Loyalty (Pingat Taat)	--	Kelantan
PTS	Commander	The Most Valliant Order of Taming Sari (the Perak State Kris - Pirwira (Paduka) Taming Sari )	--	Perak
PYGP	Star	Order of the Most Distinguished and Most Valiant Warrior (Pahlawan Yang Amat Gagah Perkasa)	--	Kelantan

== S ==
Post-nominal	Grade	Order	Prefix	Country / state
Orders and supreme military medals
SAP	Companion	The Most Illustrious Order of Sultan Ahmad Shah of Pahang (Setia Ahmad Shah Pahang)	--	Pahang
SBS	Knight Grand Commander	The Most Exalted Order of the Star of Sarawak (Satria Bintang Sarawak)	Pehin Sri	Sarawak
SDK	Companion	The Illustrious Order of Loyalty to the Royal House of Kedah (Setia Diraja Kedah)	--	Kedah
SDSA	Grand Royal Knight	The Grand Royal Order of Sultan Ahmad Shah of Pahang (Dato’ Sri Diraja Sultan Ahmad Shah of Pahang)	Dato’ Sri	Pahang
SHMS	Grand Commander	Order of Sultan 'Abdu'l Halim Mu'azzam Shah (Dato' Sri Halim Mu'azzam Shah)	Dato' Sri	Kedah
SIMP	Grand Knight	The Esteemed Order of the Crown of Pahang (Seri Indera Mahkota Pahang)	Datuk Sri	Pahang
SIS	Companion	Order of Sultan Sharafuddin Idris Shah (Setia Sultan Sharafuddin Idris Shah)	--	Selangor
SJMK	Knight Grand Commander	Order of the Life of the Crown of Kelantan - Al-Ismaili Star (Dato’ Sri Paduka Jiwa Mahkota Kelantan)	Dato’ Sri	Kelantan
SK	Medal	Certificate of Honour (Sijil Kehormat)	--	Sabah
SK	Gold Medal	Grand Medal of Kelantan (Seri Kelantan)	--	Kelantan
SMJ	Companion	Order of the Crown of Johor (Setia Mahkota Johor)	--	Johor
SMK	Companion	The Exalted Order of the Crown of Kedah (Setia Mahkota Kedah)	--	Kedah
SMK	Decoration	The Crown of Kelantan Decoration (Seri Mahkota Kelantan)	--	Kelantan
SMN	Grand Commander	Order of the Defender of the Realm (Seri Maharaja Mangku)	Tun	Malaysia
SMP	Companion	The Esteemed Order of the Crown of Pahang (Setia Mahkota Pahang)	--	Pahang
SMP	Companion	The Most Illustrious Order of the Crown of Perlis, the Star of Safi (Setia Mahkota Perlis)	--	Perlis
SMS	Companion	Order of Loyalty to Sultan 'Abdu'l Halim Mu'azzam Shah (Setia Sultan Abdul Halim Mu'azzam Shah)	--	Kedah
SMS	Companion	The Most Illustrious Order of the Crown of Selangor (Setia Mahkota Selangor)	--	Selangor
SMT	Companion	The Most Distinguished Order of the Crown of Terengganu (Setia Mahkota Terengganu)	--	Terengganu
SMW	Knight Grand Commander	Order of the Territorial Crown (Seri Mahkota Wilayah)	Datuk Seri	(Federal Territories of Malaysia) Federal Territory (Malaysia)
SMZ	Companion	The Most Select Order of Sultan Mizan Zainal Abidin of Terengganu (Setia Sultan Mizan Zainal Abidin)	--	Terengganu
SP	Medal	Warrior of Supreme Valour (Seri Pahlawan Gagah Perkasa)	--	Malaysia
SPCM	Grand Knight	The Most Illustrious Order of Cura Si Manja Kini (the Perak Sword of State - Sri Paduka Cura Si Manja Kini)	Dato’ Seri	Perak
SPDK	Grand Commander	Order of Kinabalu (Seri Panglima Darjah Kinabalu)	Datuk Seri Panglima	Sabah
SPKK	Knight Grand Commander	The Most Valiant Order of the Noble Crown of Kelantan - Al-Yahyawi Star (Dato’ Sri Paduka Kebesaran Kesatria Mahkota Kelantan)	Dato’ Sri	Kelantan
SPMJ	Knight Grand Commander	Order of the Crown of Johor (Seri Paduka Mahkota Johor)	Dato	Johor
SPMK	Knight Grand Commander	The Exalted Order of the Crown of Kedah (Dato’ Sri Paduka Mahkota Kedah)	Dato’ Seri	Kedah
SPMK	Knight Grand Commander	Order of the Crown of Kelantan - Al-Muhammadi Star (Dato’ Sri Paduka Mahkota Kelantan)	Dato’ Sri	Kelantan
SPMP	Knight Grand Commander	The Most Illustrious Order of the Perak State Crown (Datuk Sri Paduka Mahkota Perak)	Dato’ Sri	Perak
SPMP	Knight Grand Commander	The Most Illustrious Order of the Crown of Perlis, the Star of Safi (Dato’ Sri Paduka Mahkota Perlis)	Dato’ Seri	Perlis
SPMS	Knight Grand Commander	The Most Illustrious Order of the Crown of Selangor (Dato’ Sri Paduka Mahkota Selangor)	Dato’ Seri	Selangor
SPMT	Knight Grand Commander	The Most Distinguished Order of the Crown of Terengganu (Dato’ Sri Paduka Mahkota Terengganu)	Dato’ Sri	Terengganu
SPSA	Ordinary class	The Most Esteemed Perak Family Order of Sultan Azlan Shah (Datuk Sri Paduka Sultan Azlan)	Dato’ Seri	Perak
SPSJ	Knight Grand Companion	The Order of Prince Syed Sirajuddin Jamalullail of Perlis (Setia Paduka Sirajuddin Jamalullail Perlis)	Dato’ Sri Setia di Raja	Perlis
SPSK	Knight Grand Commander	Order of the Loyalty to the Crown of Kelantan - Al-Ibrahimi Star (Dato’ Sri Paduka Setia Mahkota Kelantan)	Dato’ Sri	Kelantan
SPTJ	Knight Grand Commander	The Most Blessed Grand Order of Tuanku Ja’afar (Dato’ Sri Paduka Tuanku Ja’afar)	Dato’ Sri	Negeri Sembilan
SPTS	Knight Grand Commander	The Most Valliant Order of Taming Sari (the Perak State Kris - Datuk Sri Panglima Taming Sari)	Dato' Seri	Perak
SSA	Companion	Order of Sultan Salahuddin Abdul Aziz Shah (Setia Sultan Salahuddin Abdul Aziz Shah)	--	Selangor
SSAP	Grand Knight	The Most Illustrious Order of Sultan Ahmad Shah of Pahang (Seri Sultan Ahmad Shah Pahang)	Datuk Sri	Pahang
SSDK	Knight Grand Companion	The Illustrious Order of Loyalty to the Royal House of Kedah (Dato’ Sri Setia Diraja Kedah)	Dato’ Seri	Kedah
SSIJ	Knight Grand Commander	Order of the Loyalty of Sultan Ismail (Johor) (Dato’ Seri Setia Sultan Ismail Johor)	Dato’	Johor
SSIS	Knight Grand Companion	Order of Sultan Sharafuddin Idris Shah (Dato’ Sri Setia Sultan Sharafuddin Idris Shah)	Dato’ Setia	Selangor
SSM	Grandee	Order of Loyalty to the Crown of Malaysia (Seri Setia Mahkota Malaysia)	Tun	Malaysia
SSMT	Member Grand Companion	The Most Revered Order of Sultan Mahmud I of Terengganu (Ahli Sri Setia Sultan Mahmud I Terengganu)	--	Terengganu
SSMZ	Knight Grand Companion	The Most Select Order of Sultan Mizan Zainal Abidin of Terengganu (Dato’ Sri Setia Sultan Mizan Zainal Abidin)	Dato’ Sri	Terengganu
SSP	Companion	The Order of Prince Syed Sirajuddin Jamalullail of Perlis (Sri Sirajuddin Jamalullail Perlis)	--	Perlis
SSPJ	Knight Grand Companion	The Most Esteemed Order of the Gallant Prince Syed Putra Jamalullail (Dato’ Sri Setia Putra Jamalullail)	Dato’ Sri Diraja	Perlis
SSSA	Knight Grand Companion	Order of Sultan Salahuddin Abdul Aziz Shah (Dato’ Sri Setia Sultan Salahuddin Abdul Aziz Shah)	--	Selangor
SSSJ	Knight Grand Companion	The Most Esteemed Order of the Gallant Prince Syed Sirajuddin Jamalullail (Sri Setia Sirajuddin Jamalullail)	Dato’ Sri Diraja	Perlis
SSTM	Grand Knight	The Order of Loyalty to Tuanku Muhriz (Darjah Sri Setia Tuanku Muhriz Yang Amat Terbilang)	Dato’ Sri	Negeri Sembilan
STM	Associate (Setiawan)	The Order of Loyalty to Tuanku Muhriz (Pingat Setiawan Tuanku Muhriz)	--	Negeri Sembilan
SUMZ	Supreme class	The Most Select Order of Sultan Mizan Zainal Abidin of Terengganu (Sri Utama Sultan Mizan Zainal Abidin)	--	Terengganu
SUMW	Chief Knight Grand Commander	Order of the Territorial Crown (Seri Utama Mahkota Wilayah)	Datuk Seri Utama	(Federal Territories of Malaysia) Federal Territory (Malaysia)
SUNS (ex-SPNS)	Principal Grand Knight (ex-Knight Grand Commander)	The Most Esteemed Order of Loyalty to Negeri Sembilan (Dato’ Sri Utama Negeri Sembilan, ex-Dato’ Sri Paduka)	--	Negeri Sembilan

== See also ==
- List of post-nominal letters
- List of post-nominal letters (Malaysia)
