= List of post-nominal letters (Malaysia) =

Grand knight-The Most Distinguished Order of the Territorial Crown

Post-nominal letters of Malaysia include:

== Orders, decorations, and medals ==
Grades		Post-nominal letters	Title	Wife's title	Ribbon
Grand Knight of Valour; Seri Pahlawan Gagah Perkasa		S.P.	--	--	
The Most Exalted and Most Illustrious Royal Family Order of Malaysia; Darjah Kerabat Diraja Malaysia		D.K.M.	--	--	
The Most Exalted Order of the Crown of the Realm; Darjah Utama Seri Mahkota Negara		D.M.N.	--	--	
The Most Distinguished Order of the Defender of the Realm; Darjah-darjah Yang Mulia Pangkuan Negara
Grand Commander	Seri Maharaja Mangku Negara	S.M.N.	Tun	Toh Puan	
Commander	Panglima Mangku Negara	P.M.N.	Tan Sri	Puan Sri	
Companion	Johan Mangku Negara	J.M.N.	--	--	
Officer	Kesatria Mangku Negara	K.M.N.	--	--	
Member	Ahli Mangku Negara	A.M.N.	--	--	
Medal	Pingat Pangkuan Negara	P.P.N.	--	--	
The Distinguished Order of Loyalty to the Crown of Malaysia; Darjah-darjah Yang Mulia Setia Mahkota Malaysia
Grand Commander	Seri Setia Mahkota	S.S.M.	Tun	Toh Puan	
Commander	Panglima Setia Mahkota	P.S.M.	Tan Sri	Puan Sri	
Companion	Johan Setia Mahkota	J.S.M.	--	--	
Order of Merit	Darjah Bakti	D.B.	--	--	
The Distinguished Order of Meritorious Service; Darjah-darjah Yang Mulia Jasa Negara
Commander	Panglima Jasa Negara	P.J.N.	Datuk	Datin	
The Most Distinguished Royal Family Order of Loyalty; Darjah-darjah Yang Amat Dihormati Setia Diraja
Commander	Panglima Setia Diraja	P.S.D.	Datuk	Datin	
Companion	Johan Setia Diraja	J.S.D.	--	--	
Officer	Kesatria Setia Diraja	K.S.D.	--	--	
Herald	Bentara Setia Diraja	B.S.D.	--	--	
Gallantry Award; Anugerah-anugerah Keberanian
Star of the Commander of Valour	Panglima Gagah Berani	P.G.B.	--	--	
Federation Gallantry Star	Jasa Perkasa Persekutuan	J.P.P.	--	--	
Air Force Medal	Pingat Tentera Udara	P.T.U.	--	--	
Mention in Dispatches	Kepujian Perutusan Keberanian	K.P.K.	--	--	
Nobility Award; Anugerah-anugerah Perkhidmatan
Dedication Medal	Pingat Kebaktian	P.K.	--	--	
Dedicated Service Medal	Pingat Khidmat Berbakti	P.K.B.	--	--	
Distinguished Service Medal	Pingat Perkhidmatan Cemerlang	P.P.C.	--	--	
Loyal Service Medal	Pingat Perkhidmatan Setia	P.P.S.	--	--	
General Service Medal	Pingat Perkhidmatan Am	P.P.A.	--	--	
Malaysia Commemorative Medal	Pingat Peringatan Malaysia	P.P.M.	--	--	
United Nations Missions Service Medal	Pingat Perkhidmatan Negara Bangsa-Bangsa Bersatu	P.N.B.B.	--	--	
Malaysia Service Medal	Pingat Jasa Malaysia	P.J.M.	--	--	
National Sovereignty Medal	Pingat Kedaulatan Negara	P.K.N.	--	--	
Coronation Medal	Pingat Pertabalan	P.P.	--	--	
The Order of Warriors of the Military Forces; Darjah Kepahlawanan Angkatan Tentera
Gallant Commander	Panglima Gagah Angkatan Tentera	P.G.A.T.	--	--	
Faithful Commander	Panglima Setia Angkatan Tentera	P.S.A.T.	--	--	
Warrior	Pahlawan Angkatan Tentera	P.A.T.	--	--	
Officer	Kesatria Angkatan Tentera	K.A.T.	--	--	
Herald	Bentara Angkatan Tentera	B.A.T.	--	--	
The Order of the Warriors of the Police Force; Darjah Kepahlawanan Pasukan Polis
Gallant Commander	Panglima Gagah Pasukan Polis	P.G.P.P.	--	--	
Faithful Commander	Panglima Setia Pasukan Polis	P.S.P.P.	--	--	
Warrior	Pahlawan Pasukan Polis	P.P.P.	--	--	
Officer	Kesatria Pasukan Polis	K.P.P.	--	--	
Herald	Bentara Pasukan Polis	B.P.P.	--	--	
Police Bravery Medal	Pingat Keberanian Polis	P.K.P.	--	--	
Presentation of Police Colours Medal	Pingat Keanugerahan Polis	P.K.	--	--	
National Hero Service Medal	Pingat Jasa Pahlawan Negara	P.J.P.N.	--	--	

== Orders, decorations, and medals (Federal Territory of Malaysia) ==
Grades		Post-nominal letters	Title	Wife's title	Ribbon
The Most Distinguished Order of the Territorial Crown - Darjah Yang Mulia Mahkota Wilayah
Grand Knight	Seri Utama Mahkota Wilayah	S.U.M.W.	Datuk Seri Utama	Datin Seri Utama	
Grand Commander	Seri Mahkota Wilayah	S.M.W.	Datuk Seri	Datin Seri	
Knight Commander	Panglima Mahkota Wilayah	P.M.W.	Datuk	Datin	
Commander	Johan Mahkota Wilayah	J.M.W.	--	--	
Officer	Kesatria Mahkota Wilayah	K.M.W.	--	--	
Member	Ahli Mahkota Wilayah	A.M.W.	--	--	
Medal	Pingat Pangkuan Mahkota Wilayah	P.P.W.	--	--	

Precedence:

1.	Seri Utama Mahkota Wilayah	S.U.M.W.	Datuk Seri Utama
2.	Seri Mahkota Wilayah	S.M.W.	Datuk Seri
3.	Panglima Mahkota Wilayah	P.M.W.	Datuk
4.	Johan Mahkota Wilayah	J.M.W.	--
5.	Kesatria Mahkota Wilayah	K.M.W.	--
6.	Ahli Mahkota Wilayah	A.M.W.	--
7.	Pingat Pangkuan Mahkota Wilayah	P.P.W.	--

== Sultanates ==
- List of post-nominal letters (Johor)
- List of post-nominal letters (Kedah)
- List of post-nominal letters (Kelantan)
- List of post-nominal letters (Negeri Sembilan)
- List of post-nominal letters (Pahang)
- List of post-nominal letters (Perak)
- List of post-nominal letters (Perlis)
- List of post-nominal letters (Selangor)
- List of post-nominal letters (Terengganu)

== Non-royal States ==
- List of post-nominal letters (Malacca)
- List of post-nominal letters (Penang)
- List of post-nominal letters (Sabah)
- List of post-nominal letters (Sarawak)

== See also ==
- List of post-nominal letters in Malaysia by alphabetical order
- Malay styles and titles
- Malaysian order of precedence
