= Orders, decorations, and medals of Sarawak =

Honorific medals given by Governor of Sarawak

The following is the orders, decorations, and medals given by Governor / Yang di-Pertua Negeri of Sarawak. When applicable, post-nominal letters and non-hereditary titles are indicated. The presentation of the award was usually held at The Astana, the Governor's official residence.

It was categorized into 5 groups, which are:

- Darjah Utama Yang Amat Mulia Bintang Sarawak (Most Exalted Order of the Star of Sarawak)
- Darjah Yang Amat Mulia Bintang Kenyalang Sarawak (Order of the Star of the Hornbill of Sarawak)
- Darjah Jasa Bakti Sarawak (Order of Meritorious Service to Sarawak)
- Pingat Pentadbiran Awam (Civil Administration Medal)
- Pingat Jasa Keberanian (Conspicuous Gallantry Medal)

For foreigners who received state orders or medal, the 'Honorary' post-nominal will be added after their name with 'H' (Honorary):

i.e. 'Johan Bintang Kenyalang (Honorary)'-J.B.K.(H)

. Should the award was posthumously awarded to a deceased recipient, the 'Posthumous' post-nominal will be also placed after their name, with 'P', which stands for 'Posthumous':

i.e. Late Tan Sri P. Ramlee's 'Datuk Amar Bintang Kenyalang (Posthumous)'-D.A. (P)

.

== Order of precedence for the wearing of order insignias, decorations, and medals ==
Precedence:

1.	Satria Bintang Sarawak	S.B.S.	Pehin Sri
2.	Datuk Patinggi Bintang Kenyalang	D.P.	Datuk Patinggi
3.	Datuk Amar Bintang Kenyalang	D.A.	Datuk Amar
4.	Panglima Negara Bintang Sarawak	P.N.B.S.	Dato Sri
5.	Panglima Gemilang Bintang Kenyalang	P.G.B.K.	Datuk
6.	Darjah Jasa Bakti Sarawak	D.J.B.S.	Datu
7.	Panglima Setia Bintang Sarawak	P.S.B.S.	Dato
8.	Johan Bintang Sarawak	J.B.S.	--
9.	Johan Bintang Kenyalang	J.B.K.	--
10.	Johan Perkhidmatan Cemerlang	J.P.C.	--
11.	Pingat Perkhidmatan Cemerlang	P.P.C.	--
12.	Pingat Perwira Negeri (Emas)	P.P.N. (Emas)	--
13.	Pingat Perwira Negeri (Perak)	P.P.N. (Perak)	--
14.	Pingat Perwira Negeri (Gangsa)	P.P.N. (Gangsa)	--
15.	Pegawai Bintang Sarawak	P.B.S.	--
16.	Pegawai Bintang Kenyalang	P.B.K.	--
17.	Pingat Perkhidmatan Bakti	P.P.B.	--
18.	Ahli Bintang Sarawak	A.B.S.	--
19.	Ahli Bintang Kenyalang	A.B.K.	--
20.	Pingat Perkhidmatan Terpuji	P.P.T.	--
21.	Bentara Bintang Sarawak	B.B.S.	--

== Orders, decorations, and medals ==
=== Darjah Utama Yang Amat Mulia Bintang Sarawak (Most Exalted Order of the Star of Sarawak) ===
The history of this order could be traced back to the Brooke era, where a similar order was awarded by Rajah Brooke to recognize exceptional service to the Kingdom of Sarawak. However, the order became obsolete when Sarawak became British Crown Colony in 1946. Only in 1964, the Order was revived by the state government, and it was renamed as Darjah Yang Amat Mulia Bintang Sarawak (The Most Illustrious Order of the Star of Sarawak). In 1988, the Order was overhauled, and renamed for the second time as 'Darjah Utama Yang Amat Mulia Bintang Sarawak' (Most Exalted Order of the Star of Sarawak). In 2003, in conjunction of the 40th Anniversary of Sarawak Independence, the Satria Bintang Sarawak (Knight Grand Commander of the Order of the Star of Sarawak) was instituted, with Former Malaysian PM Tun Dr. Mahathir Mohamad and Sarawak Chief Minister Abdul Taib Mahmud became its first recipients. Currently, these were the highest State Order.

There are 7 ranks, which are:

- Satria Bintang Sarawak (S.B.S.) (Knight Grand Commander of the Order of the Star of Sarawak) - limited only to 9 recipients at one time. The Recipient of this order receives the title of Pehin Sri.
- Panglima Negara Bintang Sarawak (P.N.B.S.) (Knight Commander of the Order of the Star of Sarawak) - limited to 175 recipients at one time. The recipient of this award receives the title of Dato' Sri.
- Panglima Setia Bintang Sarawak (P.S.B.S.) (Commander of the Order of the Star of Sarawak) - limited to 275 recipients at one time. The recipient of this award receives the title of 'Dato'.
- Johan Bintang Sarawak (J.B.S.) (Companion of the Order of the Star of Sarawak) - limited to 400 recipients at one time.
- Pegawai Bintang Sarawak (P.B.S.) (Officer of the Order of the Star of Sarawak)
- Ahli Bintang Sarawak (A.B.S.) (Member of the Order of the Star of Sarawak)
- Bentara Bintang Sarawak (B.B.S.) (Herald of the Order of the Star of Sarawak)

Note: Current Order above have no connection with the previous order of the same name.

=== Darjah Yang Amat Mulia Bintang Kenyalang Sarawak (Most Illustrious Order of the Star of Hornbill Sarawak) ===
There are 6 ranks for the Order above, which are:

- Datuk Patinggi Bintang Kenyalang (D.P.) (Knight Grand Commander of the Order of the Star of Hornbill Sarawak) - limited only to 20 recipients at one time. The recipient of this order receives the title of Datuk Patinggi.
- Datuk Amar Bintang Kenyalang (D.A.) (Knight Commander of the Order of the Star of Hornbill Sarawak) - limited only to 27 recipients at one time. The recipient of this order receives the title of Datuk Amar.
- Panglima Gemilang Bintang Kenyalang (P.G.B.K.) (Grand Commander of the Order of the Star of Hornbill Sarawak) - limited to 130 recipients at one time. The recipient of this award receives the title of Datuk.
- Johan Bintang Kenyalang (J.B.K.) (Companion of the Order of the Star of Hornbill Sarawak) - limited to 150 recipients at one time.
- Pegawai Bintang Kenyalang (P.B.K.) (Officer of the Order of the Star of Hornbill Sarawak)
- Ahli Bintang Kenyalang (A.B.K.) (Member of the Order of the Star of Hornbill Sarawak)

=== Darjah Jasa Bakti Sarawak (D.J.B.S.) (Order of Meritorious Service to Sarawak) ===
This order only have one rank, and it is awarded to those who rendered exceptional services to the state. This Order is limited to 100 recipients at one time. The recipient of this award (both male and female) receives the title Datu

=== Pingat Pentadbiran Awam (Civil Administration Medal) ===
This medal is awarded to those who rendered exceptional services to the state or Federal Government in Civil Service. There are 4 ranks, which are:

- Johan Perkhidmatan Cemerlang (J.P.C.) (Companion of the Distinguished Service) - Newly instituted in 2010, and its first recipient was Special Administrative Officer in the Chief Minister's Department, Mohamad Abdul Rahman.
- Pingat Perkhidmatan Cemerlang (Emas) (P.P.C.) (Distinguished Service Medal - Gold)
- Pingat Perkhidmatan Bakti (Perak) (P.P.B.) (Meritorious Service Medal - Silver)
- Pingat Perkhidmatan Terpuji (Gangsa) (P.P.T.) (Commendable Service Medal - Bronze)

=== Pingat Jasa Keberanian (Gallantry Service Medal) ===
This medal is awarded to the men and woman who served in the Armed Forces or Royal Malaysian Police, and performed an exceptional bravery and sacrifice in Sarawak. There are 3 ranks in this medal, which are:

- Pingat Perwira Negeri (Emas) (Medal of the Defender of the State - Gold)
- Pingat Perwira Negeri (Perak) (Medal of the Defender of the State - Silver)
- Pingat Perwira Negeri (Gangsa) (Medal of the Defender of the State - Bronze)

During the investiture ceremony in conjunction with the Governor's Birthday on 14 September 2013,3 personnel were awarded with the Pingat Perwira Negeri (Gangsa).

=== Other orders and medals ===
State orders

- The Most Excellent Order of the Star of Sarawak (1928–1946). There are 3 classes, which are:
- 1st Class : Master (M.S.S.)
- 2nd Class : Companion (C.S.S.)
- 3rd Class : Officer (O.S.S.)
- Darjah Paduka Seri Sarawak (D.P.S.S.) (Most Eminent Order of the Most Esteemed Star of Sarawak):(1983–1988)-dormant since 1988

Medals

- Pingat Bakti Jubli Perak (Silver Jubilee Service Medal) - in commemoration of the Silver Jubilee of Sarawak Independence within Malaysia in 1988.
- Pingat Peringatan Delima (Ruby Commemoration Medal) - in commemoration of Ruby Jubilee of Sarawak Independence within Malaysia in 2003.
- Pingat Peringatan Jubli Emas Kemerdekaan (Golden Jubilee Commemorative Independence Medal) - in commemoration of the Golden Jubilee of Sarawak Independence within Malaysia in 2013.There are 4 categories of the medal, which is:
  - 'Pengasas Pejuang Kemerdekaan (P.P.K.)', where the Governor of Sarawak and 5 others are the recipient of it during the investiture ceremony at Astana Negeri, on 16 September 2013.
  - 'Pingat Cemerlang Jubli Emas (P.C.E.)'
  - 'Pingat Bakti Jubli Emas (P.B.E.)'
  - 'Pingat Terpuji Jubli Emas (P.T.E.)'
- Pingat Perkhidmatan Setia (Loyal Service Medal) - awarded to those who performed excellence and loyal service to the State Government for 20 continuous years, or 25 years of accumulated Service. Formerly known as:
  - 'Long Service Decoration' (1928–1946),
  - 'Long Service Badge' (1946–1963),
  - 'Long Service Medal' (1963–1973), and
  - 'Pingat Perkhidmatan Lama' (1973–1996).

The Medals was usually presented by the Chief Minister, in presence of the State Secretary, at a ceremony.

- Sarawak Centenary Medal (1941) - Awarded in honor of the Centenary of Sarawak, in 1941.
- Sarawak Good Service Medal (Civilian & Military) (1928–1946). Made obsolete in 1946.
- Sarawak Conspicuous Bravery Medal (Made obsolete in 1946)
- Police Long Service Medal (Made obsolete in 1946)

== See also ==
- Orders, decorations, and medals of the Malaysian states and federal territories#Sarawak
- List of post-nominal letters (Sarawak)
