= PKC =

PKC may refer to:

== Places ==
- Perth and Kinross Council, a local authority in Scotland
- Elizovo Airport (IATA airport code PKC), Petropavlovsk-Kamchatsky, Kamchatka Krai, Russian Far East, Russia; also known as Petropavlovsk-Kamchatsky Airport or Yelizovo Airport
- Parbati-Kalisindh-Chambal Link, part of the Eastern Rajasthan Canal Project in India

== Groups, organizations ==
- PKC (conference), a cryptographic conference
- PKC Corporation, founded by Lawrence Weed, a subsidiary of Sharecare
- Papendrechtse Korfbalclub (PKC), a Dutch korfball club in the Hoofdklasse league
- Paupers' Kitchen and Clinic, Bo Town, Sierra Leone; founded by Sheik-Umarr Mikailu Jah
- Professional Karate Commission, a U.S. martial arts sports sanctioning body founded in 1986 by Glenn Keeney

== Other uses ==
- Paroxysmal kinesogenic choreoathetosis, a neurological disorder, a hyperkinetic movement disorder
- Protein kinase C, a family of enzymes
- Public-key cryptography, a cryptographic system using pairs of keys
  - Public key certificate, an electronic document used to prove the validity of a public key
- Baekje language (ISO 639 language code pkc), a Korean language
- PKC, a fictional character from the 2009 film Murder Collection V.1
- Pingat Khidmat Cemerlang (Distinguished Service Medal), a Malaysian award presented on the Pahang honours list
- Pingat Keberanian Cermerlang (Conspicuous Gallantry Medal), Malaysian post-nominal letters; see List of post-nominal letters in Malaysia by alphabetical order

== See also ==
- WPKC (disambiguation), including callsign PKC in region W
