= Penguang Manggil =

Malaysian politician

Yang Berhormat Datuk Dr. Penguang Manggil PGBK DJBS KMN MLA

State Deputy Minister of Public Health and Housing of Sarawak
- Incumbent
- Assumed office 4 January 2022
- Minister: Sim Kui Hian
- Governor: Abdul Taib Mahmud Wan Junaidi Tuanku Jaafar
- Chief Minister: Abang Abdul Rahman Johari Abang Openg
- Preceded by: Annuar Rapaee
- Constituency: Marudi

State Deputy Minister of Local Government of Sarawak
- In office 20 May 2016 – 18 December 2021
- Minister: Sim Kui Hian
- Governor: Abdul Taib Mahmud
- Chief Minister: Adenan Satem (2016-2017); Abang Abdul Rahman Johari Abang Openg (2017-2021)
- Preceded by: John Sikie Tayai (State Deputy Minister of Penan Affairs and Local Government)
- Succeeded by: Michael Tiang Ming Tee
- Constituency: Marudi

Senior Vice President I of the Progressive Democratic Party
- Incumbent
- Assumed office 10 June 2023 Serving with Rolland Duat Jubin (Senior Vice President II) & Wong Soon Koh (Senior Vice President, since 2024)
- President: Tiong King Sing

Member of the Sarawak State Legislative Assembly for Marudi
- Incumbent
- Assumed office 7 May 2016
- Preceded by: Sylvester Entri Muran (TERAS)
- Majority: 1,387 (2016); 5,976 (2021)

Personal details
- Born: Penguang anak Manggil; 4 August 1954 (age 72) Miri, Baram, Crown Colony of Sarawak (now Sarawak, Malaysia)
- Citizenship: Malaysian
- Party: Progressive Democratic Party (PDP)
- Other political affiliations: Barisan Nasional (BN) (–2018); Gabungan Parti Sarawak (GPS) (since 2018)
- Education: College of Agriculture Malaya; University of Edinburgh; Irish International University

Penguang anak Manggil (born 4 August 1954) is a Malaysian politician from the Progressive Democratic Party (PDP), a component party of the ruling Gabungan Parti Sarawak (GPS) coalition. He has served as State Deputy Minister of Public Health and Housing of Sarawak in the GPS state administration under Chief Minister Abang Abdul Rahman Johari Abang Openg and Minister Sim Kui Hian since January 2022. He served as State Deputy Minister of Local Government of Sarawak in the Barisan Nasional (BN) and GPS state administrations under Chief Ministers Adenan Satem and Abang Johari and Minister Sim from May 2016 to December 2021 and Member of the Sarawak State Legislative Assembly (MLA) for Marudi since May 2016. He has also served as the Senior Vice President I of PDP since June 2023.

== Education ==
Penguang obtained a Bachelor of Science (BSc) in Forestry (Hons.) from the College of Agriculture Malaya (UPM) in 1978. He then furthered his studies to the University of Edinburgh in Scotland and obtained a Master of Science (MSc) in Resource Management in 1989. Finally, he attended the Irish International University (IIU) between 1998 and 2001 and obtained a Doctorate (PhD) in sustainable forest management. The latter institution has been described as a "scam" by the BBC.

== Election results ==
Sarawak State Legislative Assembly
Year	Constituency	Candidate	Votes	Pct	Opponent(s)	Votes	Pct	Valid votes	Majority	Turnout
2016	N76 Marudi	Penguang Manggil (PRS)	5,493	56.89%	Elia Bit (PKR)	4,106	42.53%	9,655	1,387	66.01%
2016	N76 Marudi	Penguang Manggil (PRS)	5,493	56.89%	Louis Jalong (IND)	56	0.58%	9,655	1,387	66.01%
2021	N76 Marudi	Penguang Manggil (PRS)	8,169	74.53%	Sylvester Entri Muran (PSB)	2,193	20.01%	10,960	5,976	66.85%
2021	N76 Marudi	Penguang Manggil (PRS)	8,169	74.53%	Elias Lipi Mat (PKR)	373	3.40%	10,960	5,976	66.85%
2021	N76 Marudi	Penguang Manggil (PRS)	8,169	74.53%	Sawing Kedit (PBDSB)	124	1.13%	10,960	5,976	66.85%
2021	N76 Marudi	Penguang Manggil (PRS)	8,169	74.53%	Gilbert Young (PBK)	101	0.92%	10,960	5,976	66.85%

== Honours ==
- Malaysia
  - Officer of the Order of the Defender of the Realm (KMN) (2008)
- Sarawak
  - Order of Meritorious Service to Sarawak (DJBS) – Datu (2012)
  - Commander of the Order of the Star of Hornbill Sarawak (PGBK) – Datuk (2022)

== See also ==
- Marudi (state constituency)
