= List of post-nominal letters (Sarawak) =

This is a list of post-nominal letters used in Sarawak. The order in which they follow an individual's name is the same as the order of precedence for the wearing of order insignias, decorations, and medals. When applicable, non-hereditary titles are indicated.

Grades		Post-nominal	Title	Wife's title	Ribbon
The Most Exalted Order of the Star of Sarawak; Darjah Utama Yang Amat Mulia Bintang Sarawak
Knight Grand Commander	Satria Bintang Sarawak	S.B.S.	Pehin Sri	-	
Grand Commander	Panglima Negara Bintang Sarawak	P.N.B.S.	Dato Sri	Datin Sri	
Commander	Panglima Setia Bintang Sarawak	P.S.B.S.	Dato	Datin	
Companion	Johan Bintang Sarawak	J.B.S.	--	--	
Officer	Pegawai Bintang Sarawak	P.B.S.	--	--	
Member	Ahli Bintang Sarawak	A.B.S.	--	--	
Herald	Bentara Bintang Sarawak	B.B.S.	--	--	
The Most Illustrious Order of the Star of Hornbill Sarawak; Darjah Yang Amat Mulia Bintang Kenyalang Sarawak
Knight Grand Commander	Datuk Patinggi Bintang Kenyalang	D.P.	Datuk Patinggi	Datin Patinggi	
Knight Commander	Datuk Amar Bintang Kenyalang	D.A.	Datuk Amar	Datin Amar	
Grand Commander	Panglima Gemilang Bintang Kenyalang	P.G.B.K.	Datuk	Datin	
Companion	Johan Bintang Kenyalang	J.B.K.	--	--	
Officer	Pegawai Bintang Kenyalang	P.B.K.	--	--	
Member	Ahli Bintang Kenyalang	A.B.K.	--	--	
Order of Meritorious Service to Sarawak; Darjah Jasa Bakti Sarawak		D.J.B.S.	Datu	Datin	
The Civil Administration Medal or Distinguished Service; Pingat Pentadbiran Awam
Companion	Johan Perkhidmatan Cemerlang	J.P.C.	--	--	
Distinguished Service Medal - Gold	Pingat Perkhidmatan Cemerlang (Emas)	P.P.C.	--	--	
Meritorious Service Medal - Silver	Pingat Perkhidmatan Bakti (Perak)	P.P.B.	--	--	
Commendable Service Medal - Bronze	Pingat Perkhidmatan Terpuji (Gangsa)	P.P.T.	--	--	
Gallantry Service Medal or Medal of the Defender of the State; Pingat Jasa Keberanian
Medal of the Defender of the State - Gold	Pingat Perwira Negeri (Emas)	P.P.N. (Emas)	--	--	
Medal of the Defender of the State - Silver	Pingat Perwira Negeri (Perak)	P.P.N. (Perak)	--	--	
Medal of the Defender of the State - Bronze	Pingat Perwira Negeri (Gangsa)	P.P.N. (Gangsa)	--	--	

== See also ==
- Orders, decorations, and medals of Sarawak
- Order of precedence in Sarawak
