= PJK =

PJK can refer to:

- Pärnu JK, an Estonian football club
- Pirkkalan Jalkapalloklubi, a Finnish football club
- Pingat Jasa Kebaktian, an honor bestowed in Malaysia; see List of post-nominal letters in Malaysia by alphabetical order#P
- Party for Japanese Kokoro, a former Japanese political party from 2014 to 2018
