= Sim Kui Hian =

Malaysian politician

Yang Berhormat Datuk Amar Sim Kui Hian DA PNBS PJN MLA
- 沈桂贤
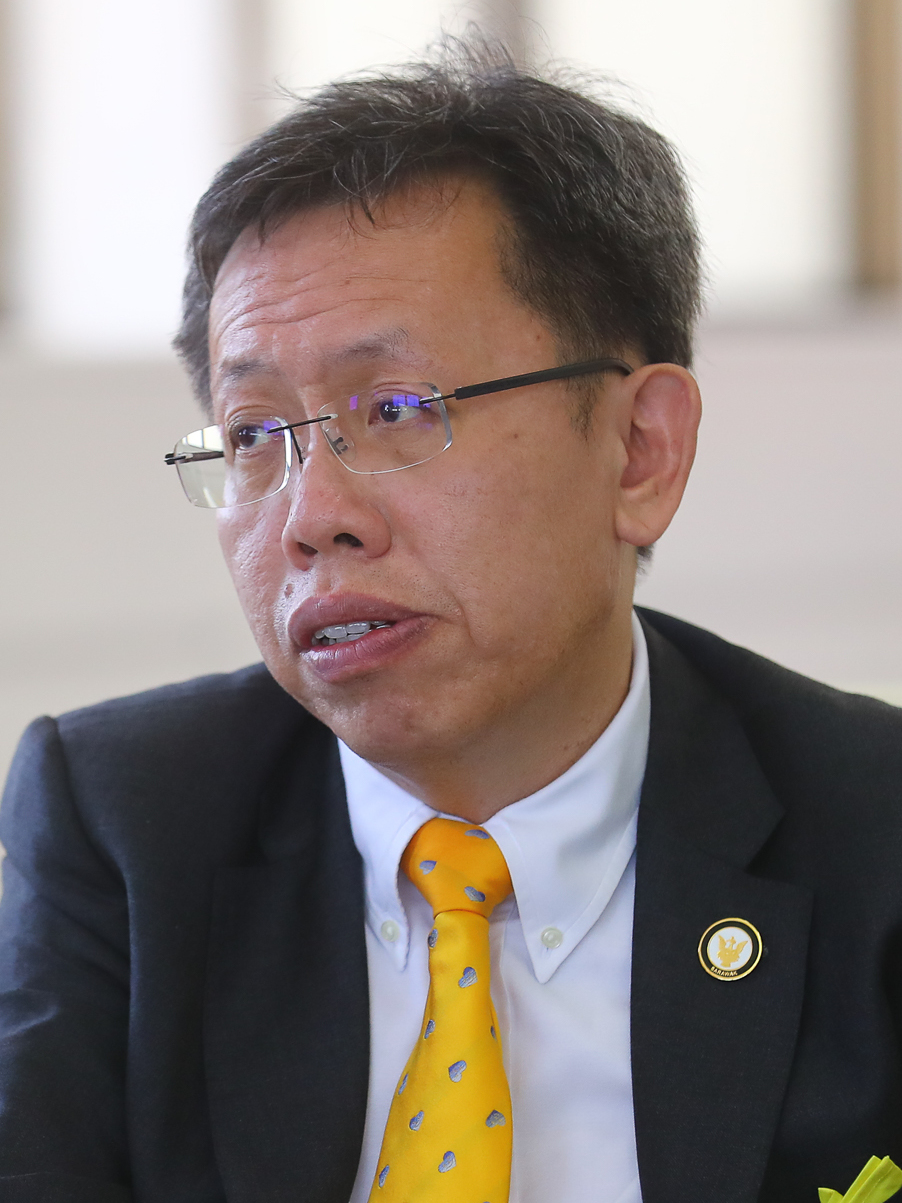
- Sim in 2017

Deputy Premier of Sarawak
- Incumbent
- Assumed office 4 January 2022 Serving with Douglas Uggah Embas and Awang Tengah Ali Hasan
- Governor: Abdul Taib Mahmud (2022–2024); Wan Junaidi Tuanku Jaafar (since 2024)
- Premier: Abang Johari
- Preceded by: James Jemut Masing
- Constituency: Batu Kawah

Minister of Public Health, Housing and Local Government Sarawak
- Incumbent
- Assumed office 4 January 2022
- Governor: Abdul Taib Mahmud (2022–2024); Wan Junaidi Tuanku Jaafar (since 2024)
- Premier: Abang Johari
- Deputy Minister (Public Health and Housing): Penguang Manggil
- Deputy Minister (Local Government): Michael Tiang Ming Tee
- Constituency: Batu Kawah

Minister of Local Government and Housing Sarawak
- In office 19 January 2017 – 18 December 2021
- Governor: Abdul Taib Mahmud
- Chief Minister: Abang Johari
- Constituency: Batu Kawah

Minister of Local Government Sarawak
- In office 13 May 2016 – 11 January 2017
- Governor: Abdul Taib Mahmud
- Chief Minister: Adenan Satem
- Constituency: Batu Kawah

Member of the Sarawak State Legislative Assembly for Batu Kawah
- Incumbent
- Assumed office 7 May 2016
- Preceded by: Christina Chiew Wang See (PR–DAP)
- Majority: 2,085 (2016); 5,393 (2021)

Senator Appointed by the Yang di-Pertuan Agong
- In office 5 June 2017 – 28 April 2018
- Monarch: Muhammad V
- Prime Minister: Najib Razak
- In office 26 May 2014 – 25 May 2017
- Monarchs: Abdul Halim (2014–2016); Muhammad V (2016–2017)
- Prime Minister: Najib Razak

6th President of the Sarawak United Peoples' Party
- Incumbent
- Assumed office 9 September 2014
- Deputy: Richard Riot Jaem; Lee Kim Shin
- Preceded by: Peter Chin Fah Kui

Personal details
- Born: 18 August 1965 (age 61) Sarawak, Malaysia
- Party: Sarawak United Peoples' Party (SUPP)
- Other political affiliations: Barisan Nasional (BN) (until 2018); Gabungan Parti Sarawak (GPS) (since 2018)
- Spouse: Enn Ong Siok Ean (王淑燕)
- Children: 2
- Parent(s): Sim Kheng Hong (沈庆鸿); Lim Su Kheng (林素卿)
- Education: Monash University
- Occupation: Politician
- Profession: Cardiologist

Chinese name
- Simplified Chinese: 沈桂贤
- Hanyu Pinyin: Shěn Guìxián

Sim Kui Hian (born 18 August 1965) is a Malaysian politician and cardiologist who served as Deputy Premier of Sarawak since 2022. A president of Sarawak United Peoples' Party, he represented Batu Kawah in Sarawak State Legislative Assembly since 2016. He also served as Minister of Public Health, Housing and Local Government Sarawak since 2022.

Born in Sarawak, Sim graduated from Monash University. Sim is Sarawak's first deputy premier of Chinese descent in more than a decade after George Chan Hong Nam stepped down in 2011. Previously, he served as the Minister of Local Government Sarawak from May 2016 to January 2017 under Adenan Satem's cabinet, and Minister of Local Government and Housing Sarawak from January 2017 to December 2021 under Abang Johari's first cabinet. He also had served as Senator in the Parliament of Malaysia from April 2014 to April 2017.

Additionally, he holds a watching brief role which gives him oversight over the Sarawak Health Department and the Sarawak Fire and Rescue Department, both agencies of the Malaysian federal government. He is also one of the founding Vice Chairmen of the GPS coalition, in which SUPP is a co-founding component party.

While acknowledging that the region of Sarawak is part of Malaysia, Sim is one of the most vocal and consistent proponents for more Sarawakian autonomous power and rights, based on the unique contexts of the Malaysia's formation as originally outlined in the Malaysia Agreement 1963 (MA63), Inter-Governmental Committee (IGC) Report and recommendations, and the Report of the Cobbold Commission.

== Policy and legislative highlights ==
Sim has taken part in major policy decisions through the years. He was first to announce about the Sarawak Cabinet and then- Chief Minister Adenan Satem's decision to officially recognise the Unified Examination Certificate (UEC) of Chinese independent schools, embracing graduates of the system into joining Sarawak-owned universities, Sarawak government scholarships and even the Sarawak Civil Service (with national language qualifications).

He is a proponent of the Sarawak Cancer Centre (cancer hospital) initiative, and public-private partnership. He also formed a Sarawak Medical Committee (SMC) under the umbrella of the Malaysian Medical Council (MMC), while frequently invoking Sarawak's historical medical board framework to justify its unique structure as part of Sarawak Health Autonomy.

Among the legislative bills he tabled in, and passed by, the Sarawak Legislative Assembly include the Building (Amendment) Bill 2025, which includes the Sarawak Building Board (SBB), accredited checkers for structural design reviews, professional oversight for architects and engineers and qualified persons, and mandatory green building standards; and The Strata Management Bill 2019, which outlines provisions of mandatory maintenance; developer liability on unsold units; and mandate elected management committees for stratified buildings.

He is the creator behind the LA Serve initiative, which led major local authorities (LA) to set up 24-7 "Serve" fast responder squads. These field squads are among the first to arrive on the scene of local authority-related incidents to assess and assist.

== Early life and education ==
Sim is the son of father Tan Sri Datuk Amar Sim Kheng Hong (Chinese: 沈庆鸿) who was the Deputy Chief Minister of Sarawak from 1974 to 1991; and mother Puan Sri Datin Amar Lim Su Kheng (Chinese: 林素卿). He received his primary education at Chung Hua Primary School No.4 and his secondary education in St. Joseph's Secondary School, Kuching. After that, he completed his Higher School Certificate at St. Bede's College in Mentone, in Victoria, Australia. He graduated with an MBBS from Monash University's Alfred Medical School and completed his cardiology fellowship at Monash Medical Centre in Melbourne.

== Early career ==
When Sim found out that the Sarawak General Hospital (SGH) was attempting to set up a cardiology unit, he left his practice and returned to Malaysia in 1998, after spending 17 years in Australia. In 2001, the Cardiology Department of SGH was set up. He was instrumental alongside Dr. Ong Tiong Kiam in the setting up of this cardiac services. The department had progressively evolved into a cardiology centre (SGH Heart Centre, which later renamed Sarawak Heart Centre) with its own standalone facilities in Kota Samarahan and a recognised training centre for cardiothoracic surgeons.

Sim's maiden contest for public office was in the 2011 Sarawak Elections which he lost. Five years later, he contested and won in the 2016 Sarawak Elections.

== Research ==
Sim is a member in the Expert Writing Panel for Clinical Practise Guidelines on management in cardiovascular disease in Malaysia; a task force member of the International Commission on Radiological Protection (ICRP) on radiation protection in cardiology; and a member of International Atomic Energy Agency (IAEA)’s Expert Panel on Radiological Protection of Patients.

Between 1996 and 2015, he participated as either a faculty member or speaker for more than 200 professional meetings in the US, Europe and Asian-Pacific; made over 200 scientific abstract presentations; over 50 scientific publications (including NEJM); and over 125 clinical trials as a principal investigator. He received Clinical Research Malaysia (CRM) Leadership Award in 2024.

His research interests include cardiac CT, cardiac MRI, metabolic syndrome and ACS biomarkers in the multi-ethnic Asian community. He is a principal investigator/steering committee member in more than 100 multicentre clinical studies in Malaysia.

== Professional credentials ==
- Fellow of Royal Australasian College of Physicians (FRACP – Cardiology)
- Fellow of American College of Cardiology (FACC)
- Fellow of Society of Cardiovascular Angiography & Intervention, USA (FSCAI)
- Fellow of Cardiac Society of Australia & New Zealand (FCSANZ)
- Fellow of European Society of Cardiology (FESC)
- Fellow of Asian Pacific Society of Interventional Cardiology (FAPSIC)
- Fellow of ASEAN College of Cardiology (FAsCC)
- Fellow of National Heart Association of Malaysia (FNHAM)
- Fellow of American Heart Association (FAHA)
- Fellow of Asia Pacific Society of Cardiology (FAPSC)
- Fellow of Academy of Medicine Malaysia (FAMM)

== Personal life ==
Sim has been married since 1991 to Associate Professor Dato Enn Ong Siok Ean (Chinese: 王淑燕), who was conferred the Panglima Setia Bintang Sarawak award (Dato’) in 2024, and they have two sons.

== Election results ==
Sarawak State Legislative Assembly
Year	Constituency	Candidate	Votes	Pct	Opponent(s)	Votes	Pct	Ballots cast	Majority	Turnout
2011	N10 Pending	Sim Kui Hian (SUPP/BN)	6,780	32.05%	Violet Yong Wui Wui (DAP)	14,375	67.95%	21,310	7,595	72.27%
2016	N14 Batu Kawah	Sim Kui Hian (SUPP/BN)	6,414	54.12%	Christina Chiew Wang See (DAP)	4,329	36.53%	12,042	2,085	70.87%
2016	N14 Batu Kawah	Sim Kui Hian (SUPP/BN)	6,414	54.12%	Liu Thian Leong (IND)	1,109	9.35%	12,042	2,085	70.87%
2021	N14 Batu Kawah	Sim Kui Hian (SUPP/GPS)	7,827	70.20%	Kelvin Yii Lee Wuen (DAP)	2,434	21.83%	11,150	5,393	57.28%
2021	N14 Batu Kawah	Sim Kui Hian (SUPP/GPS)	7,827	70.20%	Chai Keuh Khun (PBK)	756	6.78%	11,150	5,393	57.28%
2021	N14 Batu Kawah	Sim Kui Hian (SUPP/GPS)	7,827	70.20%	Fong Pau Teck (ASPIRASI)	133	1.19%	11,150	5,393	57.28%

Parliament of Malaysia
Year	Constituency	Candidate	Votes	Pct	Opponent(s)	Votes	Pct	Ballots cast	Majority	Turnout
2018	P196 Stampin	Sim Kui Hian (SUPP/BN)	18,839	36.30%	Chong Chieng Jen (DAP)	33,060	63.70%	52,550	14,221	79.33%

== Honours ==
- Malaysia
  - Commander of the Order of Meritorious Service (PJN) – Datuk (2014)
- Sarawak
  - Knight Commander of the Order of the Star of Hornbill Sarawak (DA) – Datuk Amar (2023)
  - Knight Commander of the Order of the Star of Sarawak (PNBS) – Dato Sri (2019)
  - Gold Medal of the Sarawak Independence Diamond Jubilee Medal (2023)
