= Awang anak Raweng =

Malaysian scout

Dato' Awang anak Raweng GC PSBS PJM
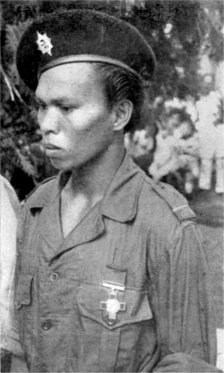
- Awang in 1952
- Born: April 20, 1925; Nanga Skrang, Simanggang, Kingdom of Sarawak
- Died: September 18, 2020 (aged 95); Simanggang, Sarawak, Malaysia
- Military career
- Rank: Sergeant
- Unit: Worcestershire Regiment
- Conflicts: Malayan Emergency

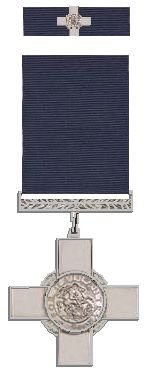
George Cross and its ribbon bar

Sergeant Dato' Awang anak Raweng, PSBS PJM GC (20 April 1925 – 18 September 2020) was an Iban scout from Sarawak in Borneo who served during the Malayan Emergency. He is known for being the only Malaysian to be awarded the George Cross, the highest British award for gallantry.

== Malayan Emergency ==
He was attached to 10 Platoon, 'D' Company, 1st Battalion Worcestershire Regiment in Malaya when their jungle patrol was attacked by 50 communist terrorists in Kluang, Johor, Malaya. Two members of the platoon, the leading scout and the section commander, were killed while Awang was wounded in the thigh. Despite his injury, he pulled Private G. Hughes to cover. Awang returned fire, repulsing every attempt by the bandits to advance, despite suffering a severe wound to his right arm. As the bandits surrounded the injured pair, Awang clasped a grenade in his left hand and dared the bandits to attack him. He held off the communists for forty minutes, forcing them to withdraw and saved Private Hughes's life.

His citation concluded "So resolute was his demeanour that the bandits, who had maintained their attacks for some forty minutes, and who were now threatened by the other sections, withdrew. The coolness, fortitude and offensive spirit displayed by Awang anak Rawang were of the highest order. Despite being twice severely wounded he showed the utmost courage and resolution to continue the fight and protect the injured soldier."

== Later life ==
He was also the recipient of the Queen Elizabeth II Coronation, Silver, Golden and Diamond Jubilee Medals and the Pingat Jasa Malaysia. On 27 October 2015, he was honoured by National Defence University of Malaysia with the Honorary master's degree in Strategic Studies in conjunction with the university's 6th convocation ceremony. He was a longhouse chief (Tuai Rumah) at his birthplace, Nanga Skrang, and he also received monthly allowances from both the Malaysian and British Governments.

On 13 October 2018, the Sarawak State Government officially bestowed him the Panglima Setia Bintang Sarawak award, which carried the title Dato', as a recognition of his heroism in conjunction with the Governor of Sarawak's 82nd Birthday Celebration.

He died on 18 September 2020 at the age of 95 in Simanggang.

== Honours and awards ==
=== Appointments ===
- Sarawak
  - Commander of the Most Exalted Order of the Star of Sarawak (PSBS) – Dato' (2018)

=== Decorations and medals ===
- United Kingdom
  - George Cross (GC) (22 January 1952)
  - General Service Medal with "Malaya" clasp
  - Queen Elizabeth II Coronation Medal (1953)
  - Queen Elizabeth II Silver Jubilee Medal (1977)
  - Queen Elizabeth II Golden Jubilee Medal (2002)
  - Queen Elizabeth II Diamond Jubilee Medal (2012)
- Malaysia
  - Malaysia Service Medal (PJM) (2004)

=== Honorary academic degrees ===
- Malaysia
  - Honorary master's degree in Strategic Studies from the National Defence University of Malaysia
