= Marudi (state constituency) =

State constituency in Sarawak, Malaysia

Marudi (N76)
Sarawak constituency

State constituency
- Legislature: Sarawak State Legislative Assembly
MLA
Vacant
- Constituency created: 1968
- First contested: 1969
- Last contested: 2026

Marudi is a state constituency in Sarawak, Malaysia, that has been represented in the Sarawak State Legislative Assembly since 1969.

The state constituency was created in the 1968 redistribution and is mandated to return a single member to the Sarawak State Legislative Assembly under the first past the post voting system.

== Demographics ==
Ethnic breakdown of Marudi's electorate as of 2022
1. Sarawak bumiputera (75.2%)
2. Chinese (13.2%)
3. Malay-Muslim bumiputera (10.7%)
4. Other ethnicities (1.00%)

== History ==
As of 2020, Marudi has a population of 132,335 people.

=== Polling districts ===
According to the gazette issued on 31 October 2022, the Marudi constituency has a total of 7 polling districts.

State constituency	Polling Districts	Code	Location
Marudi（N76）	Nabor	220/76/01	SK Lepong Ajai Sg. Liam Bakong; SK Sg. Liam; RH Wilson Ak Juna; SK Sg. Entulang; RH Engkas Ak Entari; RH Joshua Ak Dungkong Sg Mallang Ulu; SK Buri Sg. Buri; SK Sg. Arang Bakong; SK Sg. Biar Bakong
Marudi（N76）	Pengalayan	220/76/02	RH Budin Assam Paya; SK Pengalayan; RH Ngelingkong Teroja; RH Chabop Lubok Amam; SK Benawa; SK Dato Sharif Hamid; Kampong Long Maro Tinjar
Marudi（N76）	Marudi	220/76/03	SJK (C) Chung Hua Marudi; SK Sg. Jaong Marudi; SK Good Shepherd Marudi
Marudi（N76）	Beluru	220/76/04	RH Salwan Sg. Lai Bakong; SJK (C) Hua Kwong Bakong; Dewan Serbaguna Kpg. Melayu; RH Morgan; RH Linggie; SK Selepin; RH Saba Ak bagus; SK Laong; RH Tan Sg. Temam; SK Kelabit Bakong; RH Bantan Sg. Lutong Atas; RH Drahmam Sg. Lutong Atas; RH Janting Sg. Lutong Bawah, Bakong; RH Ali Sg. Sebukut, Bakong; SK Bakas; RH Pengiran Damit Sg. Mangka Bakong
Marudi（N76）	Teruking	220/76/05	SK Pengarah Enteri; RH Riggie Anak Belulok Sg. Nat Ulu Teru; SK Sg. Bong; SK Sg. Bain; RH Banyah Ak Banyi Sg. Sebubu; SK Sg. Sebatu; SK Peking
Marudi（N76）	Long Teru	220/76/06	RH Jamu Ng. Seridan; RH Nyiga Sg. Niru; RH Balang Lg Tuyut; RH Hillary Jungang Ng. Ajoi; RH Kajan Sigeh Lg. Teru; RH Meran Surang Logan Bunut; RH Musin Sebatang Bok; SK L.g. Spelling
Marudi（N76）	Jegan	220/76/07	RH Malina Ng. Tisam; SK Lg. Jegan; RH Jarau Lg Tabing; SK Long Teran Kanan; SK Sg. Seputi; SK Lapok Tinjar

=== Representation history ===
Members of the Legislative Assembly for Marudi
Assembly	No	Years	Member	Party
Constituency created
8th	N45	1970-1974	Edward Jeli Belayong	SNAP
9th	N45	1974-1979	Edward Jeli Belayong	SNAP
10th	N45	1979-1983	Edward Jeli Belayong	BN (SNAP)
11th	N45	1983-1987	Edward Jeli Belayong	SNAP
12th	N45	1987-1991	Edward Jeli Belayong	PBDS
13th	N53	1991-1996	Edward Jeli Belayong	BN (SNAP)
14th	N58	1996-2001	Sylvester Entri Muran	BN (SNAP)
15th	N58	2001-2002	Sylvester Entri Muran	BN (SNAP)
15th	N58	2002-2006	Sylvester Entri Muran	BN (PDP)
16th	N66	2006-2011	Sylvester Entri Muran	BN (PDP)
17th	N66	2011-2014	Sylvester Entri Muran	BN (PDP)
17th	N66	2014-2016	Sylvester Entri Muran	TERAS
18th	N76	2016-2018	Penguang Mangil	BN (PDP)
18th	N76	2018-2021	Penguang Mangil	GPS (PDP)
19th	N76	2021–2026	Penguang Mangil	GPS (PDP)

== Election results ==
Sarawak state election, 2026
Party	Candidate	Votes	%	∆%
GPS				▲
PH				▲
Total valid votes				
Total rejected ballots				
Unreturned ballots				
Turnout				
Registered electors				
Majority				

Sarawak state election, 2021
Party	Candidate	Votes	%	∆%
GPS	Penguang Manggil	8,169	74.53	▲74.53
PSB	Sylvester Entri Muran	2,193	20.01	▲20.01
PKR	Elias Lipi Mat	373	3.40	▼39.13
PBDS Baru	Sawing Kedit	124	1.13	▲1.13
PBK	Pierre Gilbert Young	101	0.92	▲0.92
Total valid votes		10,960	100.00	
Total rejected ballots		138		
Unreturned ballots		39		
Turnout		11,137	67.59	▲1.59
Registered electors		16,478		
Majority		5,976	54.53	▲40.16
GPS gain from BN		Swing		?
Source(s) https://lom.agc.gov.my/ilims/upload/portal/akta/outputp/1718688/PUB687.pdf

Sarawak state election, 2016
Party	Candidate	Votes	%	∆%
BN	Penguang Manggil	5,493	56.89	▼16.06
PKR	Elia Bit	4,106	42.53	▲21.61
Independent	Louis Jalong	56	0.58	▲0.58
Total valid votes		9,655	100.00	
Total rejected ballots		131		
Unreturned ballots		21		
Turnout		9,807	66.00	▲7.82
Registered electors		14,858		
Majority		1,387	14.37	▼37.65
BN hold		Swing		
Source(s) "Federal Government Gazette - Notice of Contested Election, State Legislative Assembly of the State of Sarawak [P.U. (B) 190/2016]" (PDF). Attorney General's Chambers of Malaysia. 25 April 2016. Archived from the original (PDF) on 12 June 2017. "Senarai Calon yang Disahkan Layak Bertanding Pilihan Raya Dewan Undangan Negeri ke-11". Election Commission of Malaysia. 25 April 2016. Archived from the original on 25 April 2016.

Sarawak state election, 2011
Party	Candidate	Votes	%	∆%
BN	Sylvester Entri Muran	5,466	72.95	▼4.49
PKR	Gerang Dagom	1,568	20.92	▲20.92
SNAP	Edwin Dundang Bugak	313	4.18	▼6.29
Independent	Michael Ding Tuah	146	1.95	▲1.95
Total valid votes		7,493	100.00	
Total rejected ballots		105		
Unreturned ballots		19		
Turnout		7,617	58.18	▲6.10
Registered electors		13,093		
Majority		3,898	52.02	▼14.95
BN hold		Swing		
Source(s) "Federal Government Gazette - Results of Contested Election and Statements of the Poll after the Official Addition of Votes Sarawak [P.U. (B) 245/2011]" (PDF). Attorney General's Chambers of Malaysia. 29 April 2011.

Sarawak state election, 2006
Party	Candidate	Votes	%	∆%
BN	Sylvester Entri Muran	4,954	77.44	▲9.34
SNAP	Lajan @ Telajan Luyoh	670	10.47	▲10.47
Independent	Engkamat Jelani	656	10.25	▲10.25
Independent	Hwong Him Pang	117	1.83	▲1.83
Total valid votes		6,397	100.00	
Total rejected ballots		69		
Unreturned ballots		6		
Turnout		6,472	52.08	▼3.77
Registered electors		12,425		
Majority		4,284	66.97	▲23.12
BN hold		Swing		

Sarawak state election, 2001
Party	Candidate	Votes	%	∆%
BN	Sylvester Entri Muran	4,587	68.10	▲68.10
PKR	Harrison Ngau Laing	1,633	24.24	▲24.24
Independent	Mering Imang	463	6.87	▲6.87
Independent	Nordin Maling Mohd Said Maling	53	0.79	▲0.79
Total valid votes		6,736	100.00	
Total rejected ballots		75		
Unreturned ballots		0		
Turnout		6,811	55.85	
Registered electors		12,195		
Majority		2,954	43.85	
BN hold		Swing		

Sarawak state election, 1996
Party	Candidate	Votes	%	∆%
On the nomination day, Sylvester Entri Muran won uncontested.
BN	Sylvester Entri Muran			
Total valid votes			100.00	
Total rejected ballots				
Unreturned ballots				
Turnout				
Registered electors		11,995		
Majority				
BN hold		Swing		

Sarawak state election, 1991
Party	Candidate	Votes	%	∆%
BN	Edward Jeli Belayong	4,203	52.67	▼2.48
PBDS	Patrick Sibat Sujang	3,461	43.37	▼11.78
NEGARA	China Juing @ Marcos	316	3.96	▲3.96
Total valid votes		7,980	100.00	
Total rejected ballots		133		
Unreturned ballots		20		
Turnout		8,133	64.29	▲2.92
Registered electors		12,651		
Majority		742	9.30	▼4.69
BN gain from PBDS		Swing		?

Sarawak state election, 1987
Party	Candidate	Votes	%	∆%
PBDS	Edward Jeli Belayong	4,156	55.15	▼0.85
BN	Atong Chuwat	3,102	41.16	▲41.16
Independent	Abu Bakar Abdullah @ Tom Belarek	278	3.69	▲3.69
Total valid votes		7,536	100.00	
Total rejected ballots		97		
Unreturned ballots		0		
Turnout		7,633	61.37	▼3.40
Registered electors		12,438		
Majority		1,054	13.99	▲1.99
PBDS gain from SNAP		Swing		?

Sarawak state election, 1983
Party	Candidate	Votes	%	∆%
SNAP	Edward Jeli Belayong	3,963	56.00	▼19.03
PBDS	Patrick Sibat Sujang	3,114	44.00	▲44.00
Total valid votes		7,077	100.00	
Total rejected ballots		150		
Unreturned ballots		0		
Turnout		7,227	64.77	▼1.98
Registered electors		11,158		
Majority		849	12.00	▼38.05
SNAP gain from BN		Swing		?

Sarawak state election, 1979
Party	Candidate	Votes	%	∆%
BN	Edward Jeli Belayong	4,834	75.03	▲14.35
SAPO	Limau Dali	1,609	24.97	▲24.97
Total valid votes		6,443	100.00	
Total rejected ballots		340		
Unreturned ballots		0		
Turnout		6,783	66.75	▼6.20
Registered electors		10,161		
Majority		3,225	50.05	▲28.69
BN gain from SNAP		Swing		?

Sarawak state election, 1974
Party	Candidate	Votes	%	∆%
SNAP	Edward Jeli Belayong	3,438	60.68	▼0.63
BN	Michael Babu @ Chan Choon Kay	2,228	39.32	▲39.32
Total valid votes		5,666	100.00	
Total rejected ballots		541		
Unreturned ballots		0		
Turnout		6,207	72.95	▼0.95
Registered electors		8,509		
Majority		1,210	21.36	▼21.21
SNAP hold		Swing		

Sarawak state election, 1969
Party	Candidate	Votes	%
SNAP	Edward Jeli Belayong	3,134	61.31
SUPP	Tama Weng Tinggang Wan	958	18.74
PESAKA	Baya Malang	910	17.80
Independent	Penghulu Arin	110	2.15
Total valid votes		5,112	100.00
Total rejected ballots		275	
Unreturned ballots		0	
Turnout		5,387	73.90
Registered electors		7,290	
Majority		2,176	42.57
This was a new constituency created.
