= WPKC =

WPKC may refer to:

- WPKC (AM), a radio station (1540 AM) licensed to Exeter, New Hampshire, United States
- WPKC-FM, a radio station (92.1 FM) licensed to Sanford, Maine, United States
