= Order of precedence in Kedah =

Relative preeminence of officials for ceremonial purposes

The Kedah order of precedence is a nominal and symbolic hierarchy of important positions within the state of Kedah. It has no legal standing but is used to dictate ceremonial protocol at events of a state nature.

== Order of precedence ==
Order of precedence in Kedah is as follows:

No.	Description
1	The Sultan
2	The Sultanah
3	The Raja Muda
4	The Raja Puan Muda
5	The Che Puan Besar
6	The Tunku Mahkota
7	The Tunku Puan Mahkota
