= List of post-nominal letters (Kedah) =

This is a list of post-nominal letters used in Kedah. The order in which they follow an individual's name is the same as the order of precedence for the wearing of order insignias, decorations, and medals. When applicable, non-hereditary titles are indicated.

Grades		Post-nominal	Title	Wife's title	Ribbon
State of Kedah Star of Valour (K.S.V.) - Bintang Keberanian Negeri Kedah
Star	Bintang Keberanian Kedah	B.K.K.	--	--	
The Most Illustrious Royal Family Order of Kedah - Darjah Kerabat Yang Amat Mulia Kedah
Member	Darjah Kerabat Yang Amat Mulia	D.K.	--	--	
The Most Illustrious Halimi Family Order of Kedah - Darjah Kerabat Halimi Yang Amat Mulia Kedah
Member	Darjah Kerabat Halimi Yang Amat Mulia	D.K.H.	--	--	
The Most Illustrious Sallehuddin Family Order of Kedah - Darjah Kerabat Sallehuddin Yang Amat Mulia Kedah
Member	Darjah Kerabat Sallehuddin Yang Amat Mulia	D.K.S.	--	--	
The Kedah Supreme Order of Merit (K.O.M.) - Darjah Utama Untuk Jasa Kedah
Member	Darjah Utama Kedah	D.U.K.	--	--	
The Most Esteemed Supreme Order of Sri Mahawangsa - Darjah Utama Sri Mahawangsa Yang Amat Dihormati
Member	Darjah Utama Sri Mahawangsa Kedah	D.M.K.	Dato' Seri Utama	To' Puan Seri Utama	
State of Kedah Star of Gallantry - Bintang Perkasa Negeri Kedah
Star	Bintang Perkasa Negeri Kedah	B.P.K.	--	--	
The Most Esteemed Order of Loyalty to Sultan Sallehuddin of Kedah - Darjah Kebesaran Seri Setia Sultan Sallehuddin Kedah Yang Amat Dihormati
Knight Grand Companion	Dato' Seri Setia Sultan Sallehuddin Kedah Yang Amat Dihormati	S.S.S.K.	Dato' Seri Diraja	Datin Seri Diraja	
Knight Commander	Dato' Paduka Seri Setia Sultan Sallehuddin Kedah Yang Amat Dihormati	D.P.S.S.	Dato' Paduka	Datin Paduka	
Knight Companion	Dato' Setia Sultan Sallehuddin Kedah Yang Amat Dihormati	D.S.S.S.	Dato'	Datin	
Companion	Seri Setia Sultan Sallehuddin	S.S.S.	--	--	
Star	Bintang Setia Sultan Sallehuddin Kedah	B.S.S.	--	--	
The Illustrious Order of Loyalty to Sultan Abdul Halim Mu'adzam Shah - Darjah Yang Mulia Seri Setia Sultan Abdul Halim Mu'adzam Shah
Grand Commander	Dato' Seri Setia Sultan Abdul Halim Mu'adzam Shah Yang Amat Dihormati	S.H.M.S.	Dato' Seri Diraja	Datin Seri Diraja	
Knight Commander	Dato' Paduka Seri Setia Sultan Abdul Halim Mu'adzam Shah	D.H.M.S.	Dato' Paduka	Datin Paduka	
Companion	Setia Sultan Abdul Halim Mu'adzam Shah	S.M.S.	--	--	
Star	Bintang Setia Sultan Abdul Halim Mu'adzam Shah	B.M.S.	--	--	
The Glorious Order of the Crown of Kedah - Darjah Kebesaran Gemilang Sri Mahkota Kedah
Knight Grand Commander	Dato' Seri Wira Gemilang Mahkota Kedah	S.G.M.K.	Dato' Seri Wira	Datin Seri Wira	
Knight Commander	Dato' Wira Gemilang Mahkota Kedah	D.G.M.K.	Dato' Wira	Datin Wira	
Companion	Setia Gemilang Mahkota Kedah	G.M.K.	--	--	
Member	Ahli Gemilang Mahkota Kedah	A.G.K.	--	--	
The Order of the Crown of Kedah - Darjah Yang Maha Mulia Sri Mahkota Kedah
Knight Grand Commander	Dato' Seri Paduka Mahkota Kedah Yang Amat Dihormati	S.P.M.K.	Dato' Seri	Tok Puan	
Knight Commander	Dato' Paduka Mahkota Kedah	D.P.M.K.	Dato'	Datin	
Companion	Setia Mahkota Kedah	S.M.K.	--	--	
Member	Ahli Mahkota Kedah	A.M.K.	--	--	
The Illustrious Order of Loyalty to the Royal House of Kedah - Darjah Yang Mulia Setia Diraja
Knight Grand Companion	Dato' Seri Setia Diraja Kedah Yang Amat Dihormati	S.S.D.K.	Dato' Seri	Datin Seri	
Knight Companion	Dato' Setia DiRaja Kedah	D.S.D.K.	Dato'	Datin	
Companion	Setia Diraja Kedah	S.D.K.	--	--	
The Glorious Order of the Loyal Warrior of Kedah - Darjah Kebesaran Setia Pahlawan Kedah
Knight Grand Commander	Dato' Seri Setia Pahlawan Negeri Kedah Yang Amat Dihormati	S.S.P.K.	Dato' Seri Pahlawan	Datin Seri Pahlawan	
Knight Commander	Dato' Setia Pahlawan Negeri Kedah Yang Amat Dihormati	D.S.P.K.	Dato' Pahlawan	Datin Pahlawan	
Commander	Dato' Setia Pahlawan	D.D.S.P.	Dato'	Datin	
Member	Ahli Setia Pahlawan	A.S.P.	--	--	
State of Kedah Gallantry Medal - Pingat Untuk Perkasa Negeri Kedah
Silver Medal	Pingat Untuk Perkasa Negeri Kedah	P.P.K.	--	--	
Sultan Badlishah Medal for Faithful and Loyal Service - Pingat Sultan Badlishah Kerana Taat Setia
Silver Medal	Pingat Sultan Badlishah Kerana Taat Setia	P.S.B.	--	--	
State of Kedah Distinguished Service Star - Bintang Perkhidmatan Yang Berbakti Negeri Kedah
Silver Star	Bintang Perkhidmatan Yang Berbakti Negeri Kedah	B.C.K.	--	--	
Justice of the Peace of Kedah - Jaksa Pendamai Kedah
Decoration	Jaksa Pendamai Kedah	J.P.	--	--	--
State of Kedah Distinguished Service Medal - Pingat Perkhidmatan Yang Berbakti Negeri Kedah
Silver Medal	Pingat Perkhidmatan Yang Berbakti Negeri Kedah	P.C.K.	--	--	
Public Service Star - Bintang Kebaktian Masyarakat
Silver Star	Bintang Kebaktian Masyarakat	B.K.M.	--	--	
Meritorious Service Medal - Pingat Perkhidmatan Yang Jasa Kebaktian
Silver Medal	Pingat Perkhidmatan Yang Jasa Kebaktian	P.J.K.	--	--	
Jerai Star for Vigour - Bintang Semangat Jerai
Silver Star	Bintang Semangat Jerai	B.S.J.	--	--	.
Jerai Medal for Excellent Vigour - Pingat Cemerlang Semangat Jerai
Member	Ahli Semangat Jerai	A.S.J.	--	--	.
Long Service and Good Conduct Star - Bintang Untuk Perkhidmatan Lama dan Kelakuan Baik
Silver Star	Bintang Untuk Perkhidmatan Lama dan Kelakuan Baik	B.P.L.	--	--	.
Kedah Police Medal - Pingat Perkhidmatan Lama Polis (Obsolete 1952.)
Silver Medal	Pingat Perkhidmatan Lama Polis	P.L.P.	--	--	.
Faithful Service Medal - Pingat Untuk Pekerjaan Taat Setia
Silver Medal	Pingat Untuk Pekerjaan Taat Setia	--	--	--	.
Long Service and Good Conduct Medal - Pingat Untuk Perkhidmatan Lama dan Kelakuan Baik
Silver Medal	Pingat Untuk Perkhidmatan Lama dan Kelakuan Baik	P.P.L.	--	--	.
Installation Medal 1943 - Pingat Pertabalan Negeri Kedah 1943
Silver-Gilt Medal	Pingat Pertabalan Negeri Kedah 1943	--	--	--	.
Silver Medal	Pingat Pertabalan Negeri Kedah 1943	--	--	--	.
Installation Medal 1959 - Pingat Pertabalan Negeri Kedah 1959
Silver-Gilt Medal	Pingat Pertabalan Negeri Kedah 1959	--	--	--	.
Silver Medal	Pingat Pertabalan Negeri Kedah 1959	--	--	--	.
Silver Jubilee Remembrance Medal - Pingat Peringatan Jubli Perak
Silver Medal	Pingat Peringatan Jubli Perak	P.P.J.P.	--	--	.
Gold Jubilee Remembrance Medal - Pingat Peringatan Jubli Mas
Silver Medal	Pingat Peringatan Jubli Mas	P.P.J.M.	--	--	.

== See also ==
- Orders, decorations, and medals of Kedah
- Order of precedence in Kedah
