= Hii Chang Kee =

Malaysian civil servant

Datu Hii Chang Kee (Chinese: 许赞麒; born 1967) is a Malaysian civil servant from Sarawak. He has served as Deputy State Secretary of Sarawak (Operations) and was the chief executive officer of the 2024 Malaysia Games (Sukma) hosted by Sarawak. In 2025 he was appointed chairman of Business Events Sarawak (BESarawak). He has been reported as the first ethnic Chinese to hold the post of Deputy State Secretary of Sarawak.

== Early life and education ==
Hii was born in 1967 in Sibu, Sarawak. He graduated from Universiti Sains Malaysia in Penang in 1992 with a qualification in housing planning, and later completed a master's degree in 1997. He holds further qualifications in law and human resource development.

== Career ==
=== Local government ===
Hii joined the Sarawak civil service in 1992, beginning at the Sibu Municipal Council (SMC). He rose to senior deputy secretary in 2002 and senior secretary in 2009, and served as council secretary for about five years.

In September 2015 he was promoted to Resident of the Sibu Division, effective 16 October 2015.

=== State government ===
Hii subsequently served as Permanent Secretary to the Ministry of Tourism, Creative Industry and Performing Arts Sarawak. On 30 December 2022 he handed over those duties to Sherinna Hussaini and was posted to the Premier of Sarawak's Department effective 3 January 2023. He was then appointed Deputy State Secretary of Sarawak (Operations), a role described as covering public communication, service transformation, innovation, protocol and ceremonies, and event management. Media reports described him as the first ethnic Chinese to hold the post.

As Deputy State Secretary, Hii also served as a director of the Sarawak Trade and Tourism Office Singapore (Statos), promoting trade and investment links between Sarawak and Singapore.

=== 2024 Malaysia Games ===
Hii was the chief executive officer of the 2024 Malaysia Games (Sukma), which Sarawak hosted from 17 to 24 August 2024. The Games were staged across nine administrative divisions of the state and featured 488 events in 37 sports, involving more than 10,000 athletes, coaches and managers across 15 contingents, with an additional contingent from Brunei. They were described in media coverage as the largest Sukma held to that date.

=== Business Events Sarawak ===
In October 2025, BESarawak announced Hii's appointment as chairman of its board of directors, effective 1 November 2025, succeeding Abang Abdul Karim Tun Openg. Hii had earlier chaired the Legacy Event Advocacy Policy (LEAP) Summit, which produced the Borneo Legacy Declaration.

=== 2027 SEA Games ===
In May 2026, Hii chaired the first 2026 meeting of the 2027 SEA Games Secretariat (Sarawak Cluster), as Sarawak prepared to co-host the 2027 Southeast Asian Games. Sarawak is to host 17 of the 38 sports as well as the opening ceremony.

== Other roles ==
Hii has served on the Sarawak Tourism Board, the Sarawak Arts Council and Tourism Malaysia. He has been active in the Methodist Church in Sarawak, and was elected lay leader of the Sarawak Chinese Annual Conference in 2016.

== Honours ==
Hii holds the title Datu (also rendered Datuk in some federal-level reporting).
