= Civil Administration Medal =

Pingat Pentadbiran Awam Civil Service Medal
- Type: Medal
- Awarded for: Exemplary services in Civil Service
- Presented by: the state government of Sarawak
- Eligibility: Malaysians
- Motto: Bersatu Berusaha Berbakti ("United, Striving, Serving")
- Status: Currently constituted

Highlights
- Total recipients: Unlimited
- Ribbon pattern

Precedence
- Next (higher): Darjah Jasa Bakti Sarawak (Order of the Meritorious Service to Sarawak)
- Next (lower): Pingat Jasa Keberanian (Gallantry Service Medal)

The Pingat Pentadbiran Awam (Civil Administration Medal) ranks fourth in the Sarawak State Orders, Decorations and Medals list. The medal was instituted in 1973, to recognize exemplary service in Civil Service.

In 1988, another two were added to the ranks, which is the 'Meritorious Service Medal' and 'Commendable Service Medal'. The 'Companion' rank was added to the list in 2010.

The medals are divided into four ranks:

Johan Perkhidmatan Cemerlang (Companion of Distinguished Service)	J.P.C.	None	2010	NA	NA	NA
Pingat Perkhidmatan Cemerlang (Emas) (Distinguished Service Medal-Gold)	P.P.C.	None	1973	1988	Unlimited	2
Pingat Perkhidmatan Bakti (Perak) (Meritorious Service Medal-Silver)	P.P.B.	None	1988	NA	Unlimited	3
Pingat Perkhidmatan Terpuji (Gangsa) (Commendable Service Medal-Bronze)	P.P.T.	None	1988	1988	Unlimited	4

Ribbon bars
? J.P.C.	P.P.C.	P.P.B.	P.P.T.

== Notable recipients ==
- George Chan Hong Nam
