= Most Exalted Order of the Star of Sarawak =

Highest state order in the state of Sarawak

The Most Exalted Order of the Star of Sarawak Darjah Utama Yang Amat Mulia Bintang Sarawak

Awarded by the Yang di-Pertua Negeri of Sarawak
- Type: Order of merit
- Established: 1964
- Motto: Dum Spiro Spero (Berharap Selagi Bernafas, As long as I breathe, I hope) (1964-1972); Hidup Selalu Berkhidmat (Live to Serve) (1973-1988); Bersatu, Berusaha, Berbakti (United, Striving, Serving) (1988-present)
- Eligibility: Malaysian citizens and foreigners
- Awarded for: distinguished services to the state of Sarawak
- Status: Currently constituted
- Grand Master: Tun Pehin Sri Wan Junaidi Tuanku Jaafar
- Grades: Knight Grand Commander; Knight Commander; Commander; Companion; Officer; Member; Herald
- Post-nominals: S.B.S.; P.N.B.S.; P.S.B.S.; J.B.S.; P.B.S.; A.B.S.; B.B.S.

Statistics
- Total inductees: 860 (living recipients at each time of appointment only)

Precedence
- Next (higher): None
- Next (lower): Darjah Yang Amat Mulia Bintang Kenyalang Sarawak (Order of the Star of Hornbill Sarawak)

The Darjah Utama Yang Amat Mulia Bintang Sarawak (Most Exalted Order of the Star of Sarawak) is the highest state order in the state of Sarawak, Malaysia. It is conferred to those who rendered excellent service towards the development of the state of Sarawak and Malaysia. The Order was established in 1964, a year after Sarawak's independence with the formation of Malaysia. The history of the order can be traced back to 1928, where a similar order named Order of the Star of Sarawak was established by the White Rajahs. However, the revived order has no connection with the previous order, except for the similarity of the name of the order. The motto of the Order is based on the state motto and the current one was adopted in 1988. The design of the order ribbon was changed twice, first in 1973 and again in 1988. The design follows the colors of the Sarawakian flag: blue, red and white (1973 design), and yellow, black and red (1988 design). Both the Officer of the Star of Sarawak (JBS) and Officer of the Star of Hornbill Sarawak (JBS) share the same necklace design.

== Classes ==
Order	Post-nominal	Title	Created	Changed	Living recipients at each time of appointment only	Photo
Knight Grand Commander (Satria Bintang Sarawak) previously "Darjah Utama Bintang Paduka Seri Sarawak", later "Darjah Utama Yang Amat Mulia Bintang Sarawak"	S.B.S. (formerly D.P.S.S., later D.U.B.S.)	Pehin Sri	1983	1988, 2003	8	1
Knight Commander (Panglima Negara Bintang Sarawak)	P.N.B.S.	Dato Sri formerly Dato'	1964	1973,1988	8	2
Commander (Panglima Setia Bintang Sarawak)	P.S.B.S.	Dato formerly Dato'	1997	None	18	3
Companion (Johan Bintang Sarawak)	J.B.S.	None	1973	1988	52	4
Officer (Pegawai Bintang Sarawak)	P.B.S.	None	1964	1973,1988	Unlimited	5
Member (Ahli Bintang Sarawak)	A.B.S.	None	1964	1973,1988	Unlimited	6
Herald (Bentara Bintang Sarawak)	B.B.S.	None	1973	1988	Unlimited	7

Timeline	Ribbon bars						
Timeline	D.P.S.S./D.U.B.S./S.B.S.	P.N.B.S.	P.S.B.S.	J.B.S.	P.B.S.	A.B.S.	B.B.S.
Since 1988	S.B.S. (2003–present)						
Since 1988	D.U.B.S. (1988 - 2003)						
1973 - 1988	D.P.S.S. (1983 - 1988)						
1964 - 1973							

== Recipients ==
=== Knight Grand Commander (S.B.S.) ===
Recipients of the Knight Grand Commander of the Order of the Star of Sarawak or Satria Bintang Sarawak (S.B.S.) include:

- 2003: Abdul Taib Mahmud, Chief Minister of Sarawak
- 2003: Mahathir Mohamad, Prime Minister of Malaysia
- 2017: Abang Muhammad Salahuddin, former Yang di-Pertua Negeri Sarawak
- 2017: Adenan Satem, former Chief Minister of Sarawak (posthumous)
- 2024: Wan Junaidi Tuanku Jaafar, Yang di-Pertua Negeri of Sarawak

=== Knight Commander (P.N.B.S.) ===
Recipients of the Knight Commander of the Order of the Star of Sarawak or Panglima Negara Bintang Sarawak (P.N.B.S.) also receive the title "Dato Sri". They include:

- 1990: Abang Johari
- 2002: Lim Haw Kuang
- 2002: Sulaiman Abdul Rahman Taib
- 2003: Mohd Zahidi Zainuddin
- 2003: Norian Mai
- 2003: Ling Liong Sik
- 2003: Rafidah Aziz
- 2003: Samy Vellu Sangalimuthu
- 2003: Mohd Effendi Norwawi
- 2003: Mohamad Asfia Awang Nasar
- 2003: Wong Soon Koh
- 2003: Samsudin Osman
- 2003: Shamsudin Hitam
- 2003: Zainul Ariff Hussain
- 2003: Mohd Hassan Marican
- 2003: Saleh Abdullah Kamel (Honorary)
- 2005: Hadenan Abdul Jalil
- 2005: Abdul Rashid Abdul Rahman
- 2005: Gathorne Gathorne-Hardy, 5th Earl of Cranbrook (Honorary)
- 2006: Mohd Bakri Omar
- 2006: Chan Kong Choy
- 2006: Ahmad Tarmizi Sulaiman
- 2006: Awang Tengah Ali Hasan
- 2006: William Mawan Ikom
- 2006: Leo Michael Toyad
- 2007: Arshad Ayub
- 2007: Musa Hassan
- 2008: Lim Keng Yaik
- 2008: Nor Mohamed Yakcop
- 2008: Mohamed Khaled Nordin
- 2008: Muhyiddin Yassin
- 2008: Mohd Sidek Hassan
- 2008: Mahmud Abu Bekir Taib
- 2008: Albert Hong Hin Kay (Honorary)
- 2009: Abdul Gani Patail
- 2009: Douglas Uggah Embas
- 2009: Michael Manyin Jawong
- 2010: Azizan Ariffin
- 2010: Wan Abdul Aziz Wan Abdullah
- 2010: Mahmood Adam
- 2010: Nasir Sakaran
- 2011: Mohammad Ali Mahmud
- 2011: Jamil Al-Sufri (Honorary)
- 2012: John Lau Kah Sieng
- 2012: Yaw Chee Ming
- 2012: Nawawi Taha (Honorary)
- 2013: Ahmad Zahid Hamidi
- 2013: Hishammuddin Hussein
- 2013: Ali Hamsa
- 2013: Lim Kok Wing
- 2013: Kazuhisa Kogo (Honorary)
- 2014: Shafie Apdal
- 2014: Lim Jock Seng
- 2014: Wan Junaidi Tuanku Jaafar
- 2014: Wahab Suhaili
- 2015: Zulkifeli Mohd Zin
- 2015: Mohamad Zabidi Zainal
- 2016: Ambrin Buang
- 2016: Bustari Yusuf
- 2016: Stephen Rundi Utom
- 2017: Rohani Abdul Karim
- 2017: Richard Riot Jaem
- 2017: Fatimah Abdullah
- 2017: Fong Joo Chung
- 2018: Tiong King Sing
- 2018: Sharifah Mordiah Tuanku Fauzi
- 2019: Sim Kui Hian
- 2019: Gramong Juna
- 2019: Mohamad Abu Bakar Marzuki
- 2021: Nancy Shukri
- 2021: Lee Kim Shin
- 2021: Abdul Karim Rahman Hamzah
- 2021: Talat Mahmood Abdul Rashid
- 2021: Wan Lizozman Wan Omar
- 2021: Kho Kak Beng
- 2022: Fadillah Yusof
- 2022: Zamrose Mohd Zain
- 2022: Abang Abdul Karim Abang Openg
- 2022: Abdul Wahab Dollah
- 2022: Wong Kie Yik
- 2023: Aaron Ago Dagang
- 2023: Azam Baki
- 2023: Ronald Sagah Wee Inn
- 2023: John Sikie Tayai
- 2023: Julaihi Narawi
- 2023: Sulong Matjeraie
- 2023: Mohd Naroden Majais
- 2023: Abdul Ghafur Shariff
- 2023: Qamarul Naim Mohd Faizal
- 2024: Abdul Rahman Sebli
- 2024: Wan Hamid Edruce Tuanku Mohammad
- 2024: Saferi Ali
- 2024: Muhammad Abdullah Zaidel
- 2025: Joseph Salang Gandum
- 2025: Richard Wee Liang Chiat

=== Commander (P.S.B.S.) ===
Recipients of the Commander of the Most Exalted Order of the Star of Sarawak or Panglima Setia Bintang Sarawak (P.S.B.S.) include:-

- 2004: Judson Sakai Tagal (posthumous)
- 2004: Zakaria Jaffar
- 2004: Che Min Che Ahmad
- 2004: Henry Lau Lee Kong
- 2004: Hussain Paris
- 2004: Vincent G. Chapman
- 2004: Ursula Goh
- 2006: James Dawos Mamit
- 2009: Dayang Morliah Awang Daud
- 2009: William Wei How Sieng
- 2009: Sarbanun Abdul Kadir Marican
- 2009: Abu Bakar Abdullah @ Tom Belarek
- 2009: Mohamad Ramji Alli
- 2009: Bujang Tun Ahmad Zaidi Adruce
- 2009: Su Chii Ann
- 2009: Paul Teo Choo Tee
- 2011: Rhodzariah Bujang
- 2011: Jamil Hamali
- 2011: Mohammad Medan Abdullah
- 2011: Janet Lau Ung Mie
- 2011: Liew Wee Lik
- 2011: Alexander Maiyor
- 2011: Mohamad Sait Ahmad
- 2011: Wan Morshidi Tuanku Abdul Rahman
- 2011: Usop Wahap @ Sani Wahap
- 2011: Abang Jemat Abang Bujang
- 2011: Abang Talhata bin Abang Hazemi
- 2011: Koh Yaw Hui
- 2011: Rugayah Abdul Majid
- 2011: Seyed Ali Dabier Moghaddam (Honorary)
- 2012: James Chan Khay Syn
- 2015: Temenggong Vincent Lau
- 2015: Paduka Muhammad Juanda Abdul Rashid (Honorary)
- 2017: Muhammad Daniel Damian Abdullah
- 2017: Ahmad Lai Bujang
- 2017: Yao Sik Chii
- 2017: Rabiah Johari
- 2017: Sharkawi Alis
- 2017: Alex Ting Kuang Kuo
- 2017: Helmi Mohd Gol
- 2017: Bernard Agan Assan
- 2017: Goh Leng Chua
- 2017: Yepni @ Yet Adenan
- 2018: Awang anak Raweng
- 2018: Yong Piaw Soon
- 2018: Tan Jit Kee
- 2018: Chieng Buong Toon
- 2018: Marcus Leong
- 2018: Musa Giri
- 2018: Munirah Mohd Hassan
- 2018: Ismawi Duet
- 2018: Mustapha Kamal Ahmad Fauzi
- 2018: Sulaiman Narawi
- 2018: Anang Bungsu
- 2018: Philimon Nuing

=== Companion (J.B.S.) ===
Recipients of the Companion of the Most Exalted Order of the Star of Sarawak or Johan Bintang Sarawak (J.B.S.) include:

- 2004: Marcus Raja (posthumous)
- 2004: Lawrence Th'ng Kok Kuang (posthumous)
- 2004: Judith Satem Nee Palmer
- 2004: Chou Chii Ming
- 2009: Jelaing Mersat
- 2009: Abang Mohamad Atei Abang Medaan
- 2009: James Chan Khay Syn
- 2009: Mohd Amin Hassan
- 2009: Mohamed Ali Mohamed Sheriff
- 2009: Abang Amir Abang Latip
- 2009: Dayang Madinah Tun Abang Haji Openg
- 2016: Haw Min @ Chiew Min Wai
- 2016: Ting Hua Sing

=== Officer (P.B.S.) ===
Recipients of the Officer of the Most Exalted Order of the Star of Sarawak or Pegawai Bintang Sarawak (P.B.S.) include:

- 1999: Bibi Macpherson@McPherson
- 2015: Pemanca Sahari Gani
- 2015: Tan Hock Heng

=== Member (A.B.S.) ===
- 1985: Douglas Uggah Embas
- 2008: Koh Ek Chong
- 2021: Julie Ting Chek Ho
- 2025: Johan Ghazali

=== Herald (B.B.S.) ===
- 1984: Douglas Uggah Embas
