= Order of Meritorious Service to Sarawak =

Darjah Jasa Bakti Sarawak Order of Meritorious Service to Sarawak

Awarded by The State Government of Sarawak
- Type: Order
- Established: 1997
- Motto: Bersatu Berusaha Berbakti ("United, Striving, Serving")
- Eligibility: Malaysians
- Awarded for: Meritorious and exemplary service to the State
- Status: Currently constituted
- Grades: Commander (DJBS)

Statistics
- Total inductees: 100 (living recipients at one time only)

Precedence
- Next (higher): Darjah Yang Amat Mulia Bintang Kenyalang Sarawak (Order of the Star of Hornbill Sarawak)
- Next (lower): Pingat Pentadbiran Awam (Civil Administration Medal)
- Ribbon pattern

The Darjah Jasa Bakti Sarawak (Order of Meritorious Service to Sarawak) is the third-ranking order in the list of orders of the Sarawak State Orders, Decorations and Medals. The Order was instituted in 1997, and is limited to only 100 living recipients at one time. This order may be awarded to any civil servants or officers of statutory bodies that discharged their duties honourably and rendered excellent service to the State of Sarawak.

The Order consists of a Breast Star, a Sash, a Sash Badge, and a Miniature Medal.

The recipients of the order will receive the title Datu (for both male & female recipients) while the wives are styled Datin. Husbands of recipients do not enjoy a courtesy title.

== Recipients ==
Recipients of the Darjah Jasa Bakti Sarawak include:-

- Datu Mohamed Khalid Yusuf, State Director, Royal Customs Department - 2004
- Datu Vasco Sabat Singkang, General Manager, Sarawak Land Consolidation and Rehabilitation Authority (SALCRA) - 2004
- Datu Dr Adi Badiozaman Tuah alias Badio Zaman Tuah, State Education Director - 2004
- Datu Haji Loling Othman bin Haji Alwi, State Mufti - 2004
- Datu Haji Mohammed Sepuan Anu, State Director of Agriculture - 2004
- Datu Haji Len Salleh - 2006
- Datu Sarudu Hoklai, Director, Human Resource Development Unit, Chief Minister's Department - 2009
- Datu Romie Sigan Daniel, Resident, Betong Division - 2009
- Datu Masbah Ariffin, Clerk, Sarawak State Cabinet - 2009
- Datu Abu Bakar Mat, Director, Sarawak National Registration Department - 2009
- Datu Mohidin Ishak, General Manager, Bintulu Development Authority - 2009
- Datu Dr Julaihi Bujang, State Education Director - 2009
- Datu Takun Sunggah, State Director, Elections Commission - 2009
- Datu Chaiti Bolhassan, Permanent Secretary, Ministry of Rural Development Sarawak - 2010
- Datu Dr Ngenang Janggu, Permanent Secretary, Ministry of Agriculture Modernisation Sarawak - 2010
- Datu Ik Pahon Joyik, Permanent Secretary, Ministry of Tourism and Heritage Sarawak - 2010
- Datu Junaidi Reduan, State Financial Secretary - 2010
- Datu Mustapa Han, Private Secretary to the Chief Minister of Sarawak - 2010
- Datu Dr Sulaiman Husain, General Manager, Sarawak Economic Development Corporation (SEDC) - 2010
- Datu Dr Andrew Kiyu Dawie, former State Director of Health - 2010
- Datu Lai Kui Fong, Director of Agriculture Sarawak - 2014
- Datu Jumastapha Lamat, State Accountant General - 2014
- Datu Thomas Akin Jelimin, Judge, Bumiputera Court of Sarawak -2014
- Datu Safri Zainuddin, Permanent Secretary, Sarawak Ministry of Infrastructure Development and Transportation - 2017
- Datu Ir Zuraimi Sabki, Director, Sarawak Public Works Department - 2017
- Datu William Patrick Nyigor, State Human Resource Director - 2017
- Datu Micheal Dawi Alli, Chief Registrar, Bumiputera Court of Sarawak - 2017
- Datu Sutin Shamat, Secretary of the State Cabinet Meeting Committee - 2018
- Datu Wan Lizosman Wan Omar Sutin Shamat, Permanent Secretary, Sarawak Ministry of Urban Development and Natural Resources - 2018
- Datu Soedirman Aini, General Manager, Sarawak Economic Development Corporation (SEDC) - 2018
- Datu Sharbini Suhaili, CEO, Sarawak Energy Berhad (SEB) - 2018
- Prof Datu Mohd Fadzil Abdul Rahman, Deputy Vice Chancellor, Universiti Malaysia Sarawak - 2018
- Datu Ken Leben, Director, Sarawak Immigration Department - 2018
