= University of Putra Malaysia =

Public research university in Serdang, Selangor, Malaysia

Coordinates: 2°59′57″N 101°42′28″E

- Universiti Putra Malaysia (Malay)
- Emblem of UPM
- Former names: School of Agriculture (1931–1947); College of Agriculture Malaya (1947–1971); Universiti Pertanian Malaysia (1971–1997)
- Motto: Berilmu Berbakti
- Motto in English: With Knowledge We Serve
- Type: Public research university
- Established: 29 October 1971; 55 years ago (Note: The School of Agriculture was established on 21 May 1931, and it became a university in 1971.)
- Affiliations: AAACU, ACU, APAARI, APUCEN, ASAIHL, ASEA-UNINET, AUAP, AUN, FUIW, UAiTED
- Chancellor: Sultan Sharafuddin Idris Shah
- Vice-Chancellor: Arifin Abdu
- Academic staff: 1,807 (Dec 2024)
- Administrative staff: 5,257 (Dec 2024)
- Students: 30,720 (Dec 2024)
- Undergraduates: 18,602 (Dec 2024)
- Postgraduates: 12,118 (Dec 2024)
- Location: Persiaran Universiti, Serdang, Selangor, 43400, Malaysia
- Campus: 1,245.056 hectares (3,076.60 acres) (Note: The area of Serdang campus only.); Urban
- Colours: Red, grey and white
- Website: upm.edu.my

University of Putra Malaysia (Malay: Universiti Putra Malaysia), abbreviated as UPM, is a Malaysian public research university located in Serdang, Selangor. It was formerly named Universiti Pertanian Malaysia (Agricultural University of Malaysia), focusing on agricultural sciences and related fields. Since the 1990s, the fields of study have expanded to include human ecology, languages, architecture, medicine, computer science and biotechnology. Currently UPM comprises 15 faculties, 11 institutes and 2 schools covering these as well as agriculture, forestry, veterinary medicine, economics, engineering, sciences, and education.

UPM has been recognised as a research university since 2006, one of five present in Malaysia. In 2010, self-accreditation status was awarded by Malaysian Qualifications Agency to simplify the procedure of accrediting academic programs, strengthening its own Internal Quality Assurance (IQA) system enabling it to compete among local universities.

== History ==
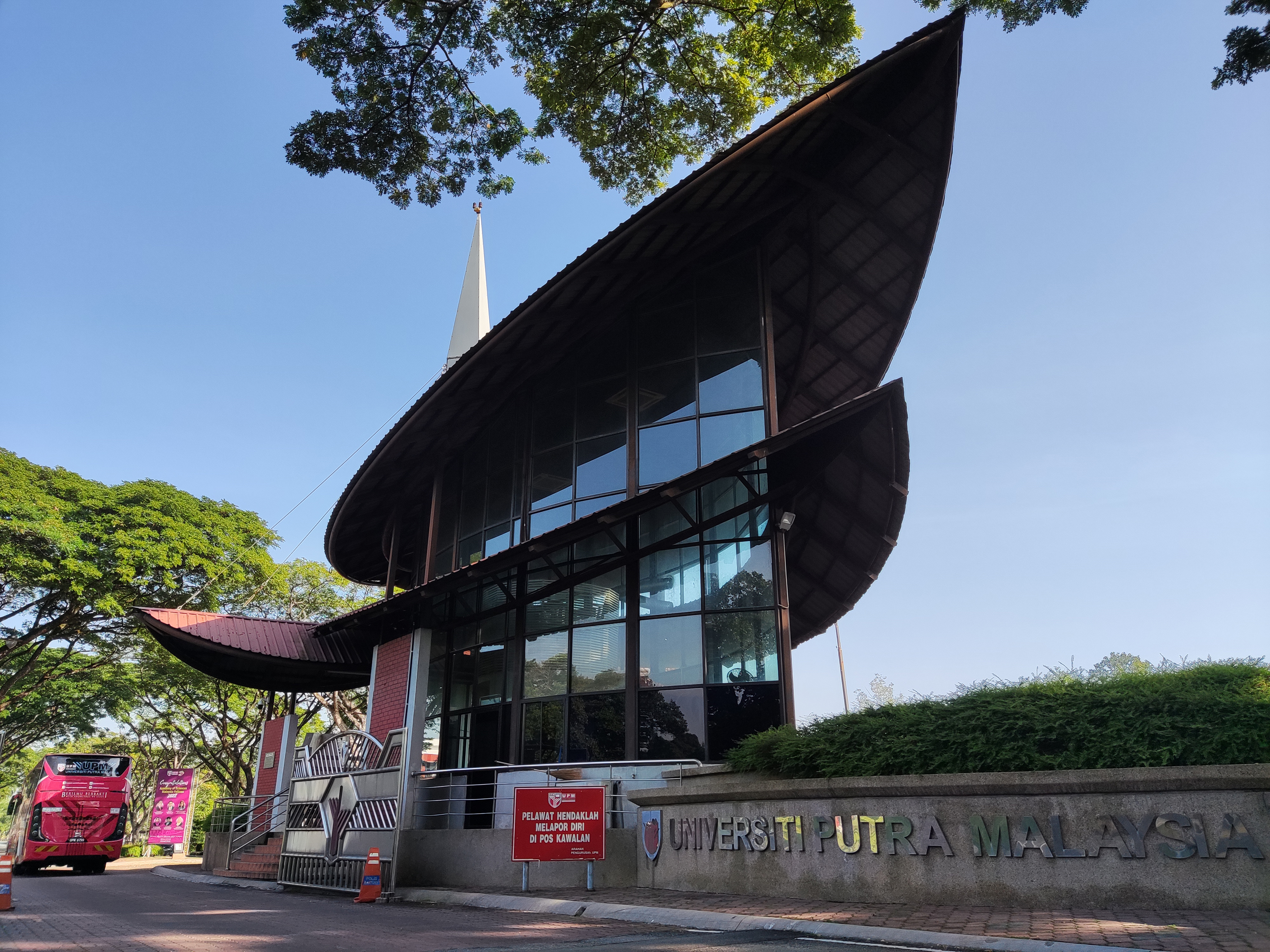
Anjung Putra, the main entrance of UPM

On 21 May 1931, UPM was established as the School of Agriculture, located in Serdang on 22 acres (9 hectares) of land. The institution initially offered only two programmes: a three-year diploma programme and a one-year certificate course in agriculture. On 23 June 1947, the school was upgraded to the College of Agriculture Malaya, as declared by the then Governor of the Malayan Union, Sir Edward Gent.

On 29 October 1971, Universiti Pertanian Malaysia (literally "Agricultural University of Malaysia") was officially established through the merger of the College of Agriculture Malaya and the Faculty of Agriculture, University of Malaya. UPM began with three faculties: agriculture, forestry and veterinary medicine. On 23 July 1973, UPM opened its first academic session with an intake of 1,559 students. Four years later, on 30 July 1977, the university held its first convocation ceremony, during which Sultan Salahuddin Abdul Aziz Shah was installed as UPM's first Chancellor.

On 3 April 1997, UPM was renamed Universiti Putra Malaysia by then Prime Minister Mahathir Mohamad. The change reflected the university’s diversification into broader fields of study, particularly in science and technology. The word "Putra" honours Tunku Abdul Rahman Putra Al-Haj, the first Prime Minister of Malaysia, and also reflects the university’s proximity to Putrajaya. To correspond with the new name, UPM also adopted a new logo.

== List of chancellors and vice-chancellors ==
#	Chancellors	Term in office
1	Sultan Salahuddin of Selangor	1 January 1977 – 30 July 1993
2	Hamdan Sheikh Tahir the Governor of Penang	1 August 1993 – 31 March 2002
3	Sultan Sharafuddin of Selangor	1 April 2002 – Incumbent

#	Vice-Chancellors	Academic qualification	Term in office
1	Mohd Rashdan Baba	Diploma of Agriculture (College of Agriculture Malaya), Bachelor of Agricultural Science (Reading), PhD in Agricultural Science (Leeds).	4 November 1971 – 28 February 1982
2	Nayan Ariffin	Diploma in Agriculture (College of Agriculture Malaya), Bachelor of Agricultural Science (Louisiana), Master of Education in Advanced Science (Louisiana), PhD in Extension Education (Wisconsin).	1 March 1982 – 4 June 1994
3	Syed Jalaludin Syed Salim	Bachelor of Veterinary Science (Punjab), Master in Animal Science (London), PhD in Animal Science (London).	5 June 1994 – 17 April 2001
4	Zohadie Bardaie	Diploma of Agriculture (UPM), Bachelor of Science in engineering (California), Master of Engineering (California), PhD of Agricultural Engineering (Cornell).	18 April 2001 – 31 December 2005
5	Nik Mustapha Raja Abdullah	Diploma of Agriculture (UPM), Bachelor of Economics (California), Master of Agricultural Science (Oregon), PhD of economics (Oregon).	1 January 2006 – 31 December 2010
6	Radin Umar Radin Sohadi	Bachelor of Civil Engineering (Sheffield), Master of Engineering (Sheffield), PhD of engineering (Birmingham).	1 January 2011 – 31 December 2012
7	Mohd Fauzi Ramlan	Diploma of Agriculture (UPM), Bachelor of Science in agronomy (Iowa), Master of Science (Louisiana), PhD in biology (York).	1 January 2013 – 31 December 2015
8	Aini Ideris	Bachelor of Veterinary Medication (UPM), Master of Veterinary Science (Liverpool), PhD in Veterinary Science (UPM).	1 January 2016 – 30 June 2020
9	Roslan Sulaiman	Bachelor of Veterinary Medication (UPM), PhD in Nervous System Physiology (Edinburgh).	1 September 2020 – 31 August 2023
10	Ahmad Farhan Mohd Sadullah	Bachelor of Civil Engineering (CUA), Master of Transportation (Imperial), PhD in Transportation Studies (UCL).	2 October 2023 – 18 September 2026
11	Arifin Abdu	Bachelor of Forestry (Forest Management), Master of Forestry (UPM), PhD of Forestry Rehabilitation and Sustainability (Japan)	18 September-present

== Campus ==
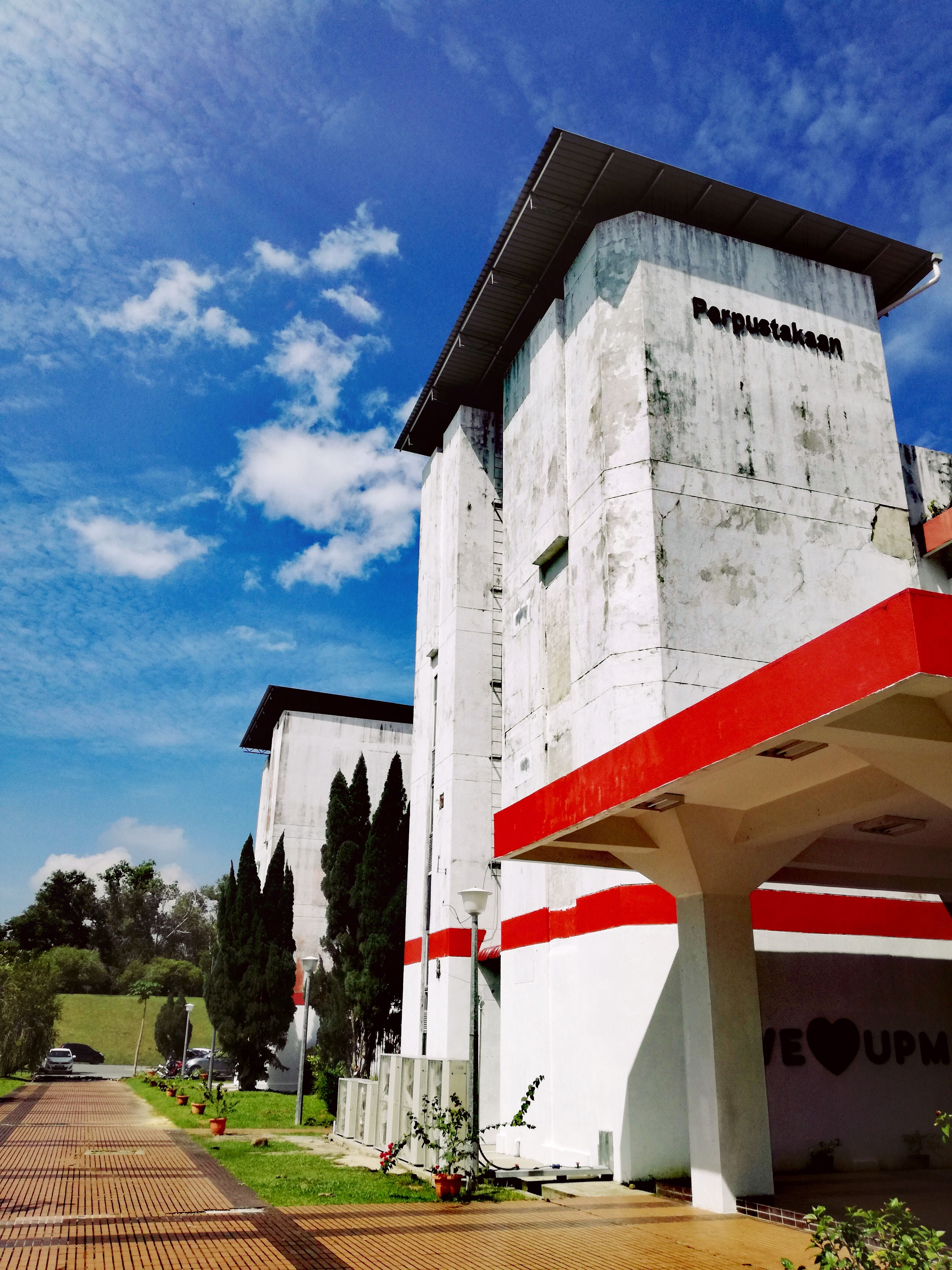
Library at the Bintulu campus

Apart from its main campus in Serdang, UPM also operates a branch campus in Bintulu, Sarawak. In June 1987, the National Resources Training Centre was relocated to Bintulu from its temporary campus in Kuching. On 27 August 1987, the Bintulu campus officially became a branch campus of UPM, abbreviated as UPMKB. Today, the campus comprises two faculties — the Faculty of Agricultural and Forestry Sciences and the Faculty of Humanities, Management and Science — as well as one institute, the Institute of Ecosystem Science Borneo. It offers both undergraduate and postgraduate programmes, with a total student population of around 1,600.

UPM previously maintained another branch campus in Mengabang Telipot, Kuala Terengganu, from 1996 until the establishment of Terengganu University College in 1999. Originally functioning as the Centre for Fisheries and Marine Science under UPM, the Faculty of Fisheries and Marine Science was moved to Kuala Terengganu in June 1996, where it was upgraded into a UPM branch campus. On 5 May 1999, the campus was renamed Terengganu University College and became an associate campus of UPM. In 2001, it was granted autonomy and renamed Malaysian Science and Technology University College. In 2007, it achieved full university status as the Universiti Malaysia Terengganu.

== Academic profile ==
UPM began its academic life in 1973 with three founding Faculties and a Division of Basic Sciences. The first intake of 1,559 students was for bachelor's degrees in Agricultural Science or Forestry Science, Doctor of Veterinary Medicine, Diploma in Home Technology, Diploma in Animal Health and Production, Diploma in Science with Education, and Preliminary Programme. As of 2024, UPM has 15 faculties, 11 institutes and 2 schools, offers 10 diploma programmes, 81 bachelor programmes, 75 Masters programmes by coursework and more than 300 fields of study in Master and Doctoral programmes by research. The Doctor of Medicine program provided by university was fully recognised by the Malaysia Medical Council on 5 June 2001. The School of Business and Economics (previously Faculty of Economics and Management) has been accredited by AACSB in 2012, EQUIS in 2022, and AMBA in 2025, became the only triple crown business school in Malaysia.

== Faculties, schools and institutes ==
As of February 2024, UPM has 15 faculties, 11 institutes and 2 schools.

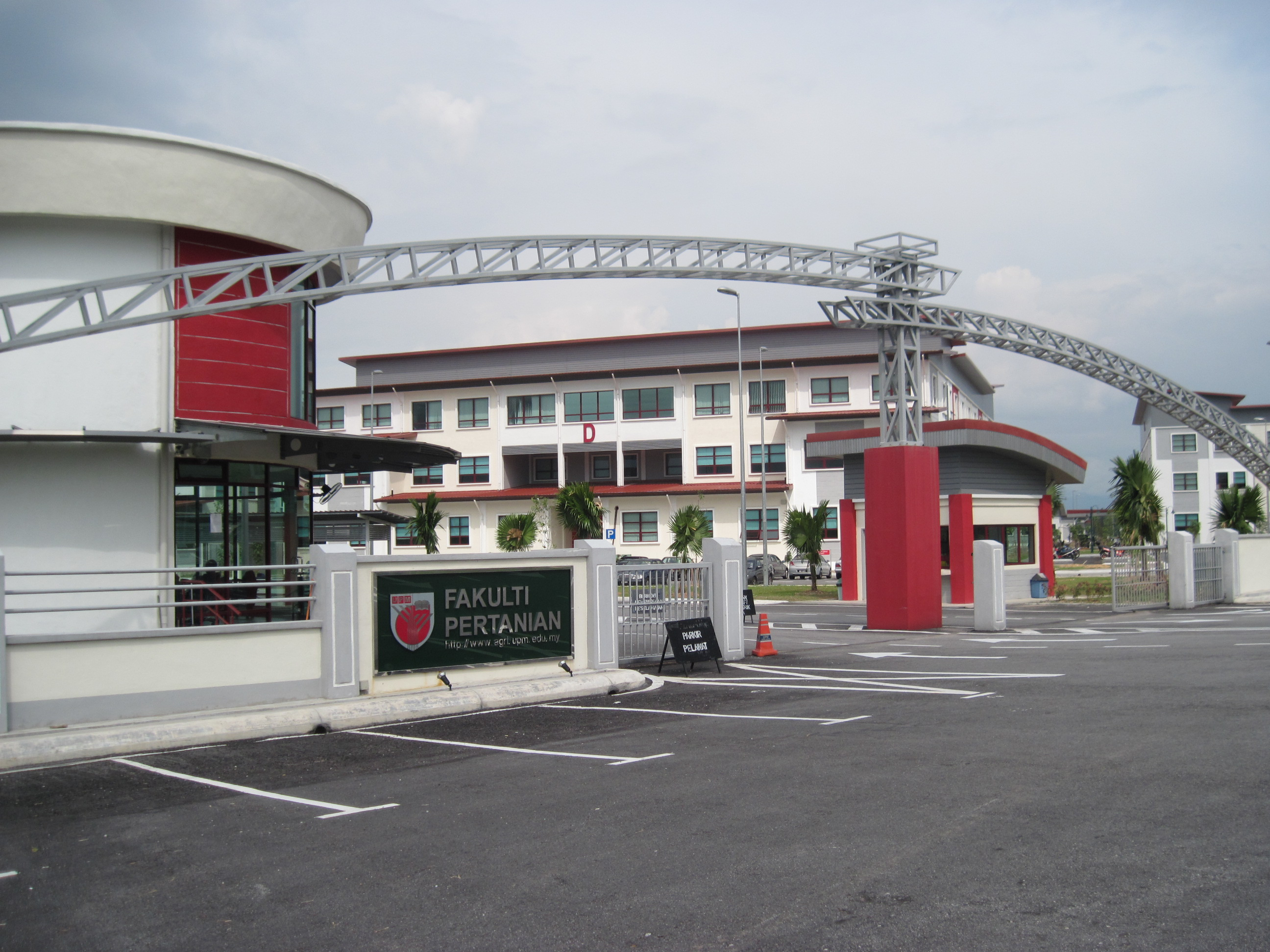
Faculty of Agriculture

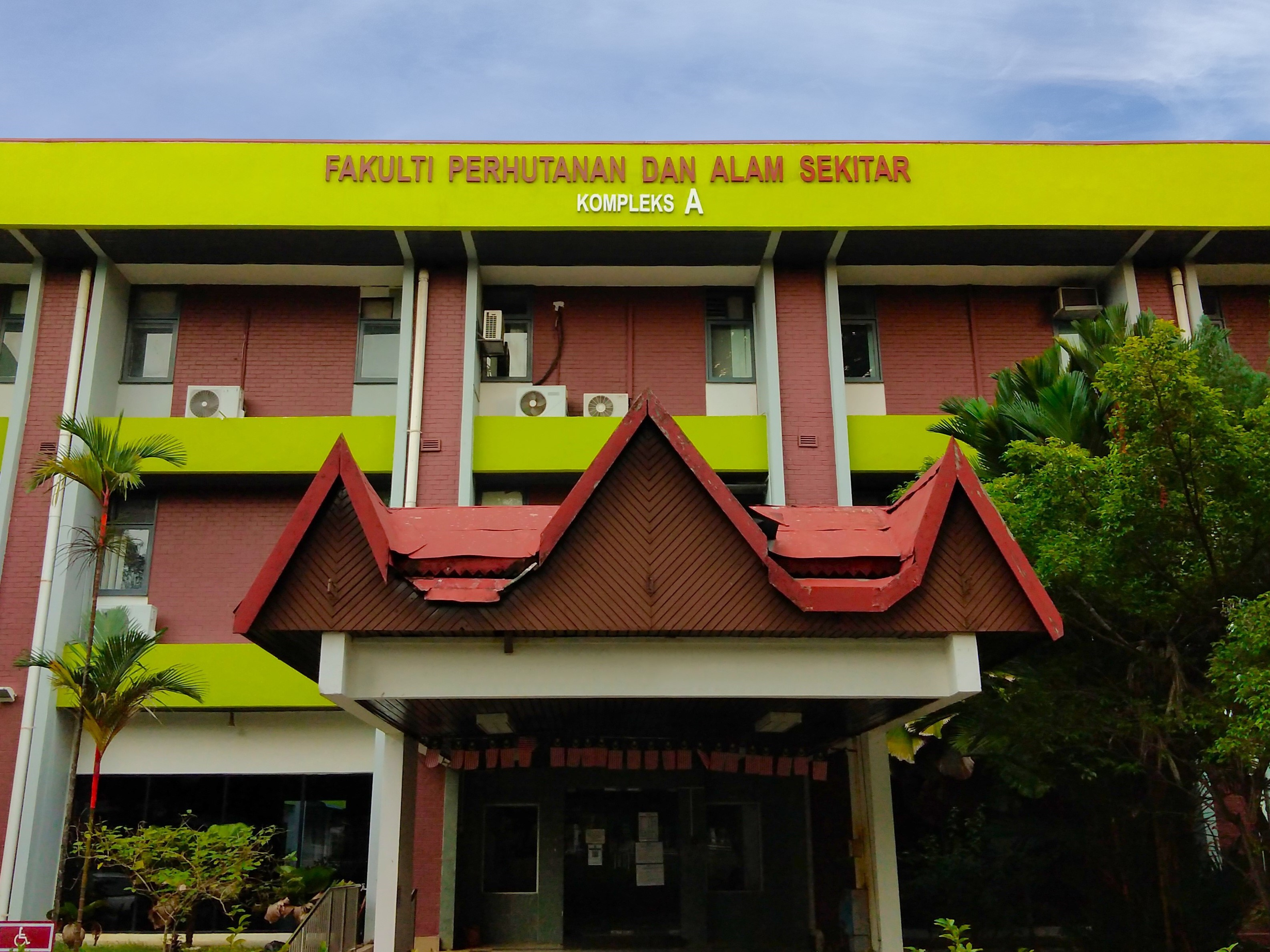
Faculty of Forestry and Environment

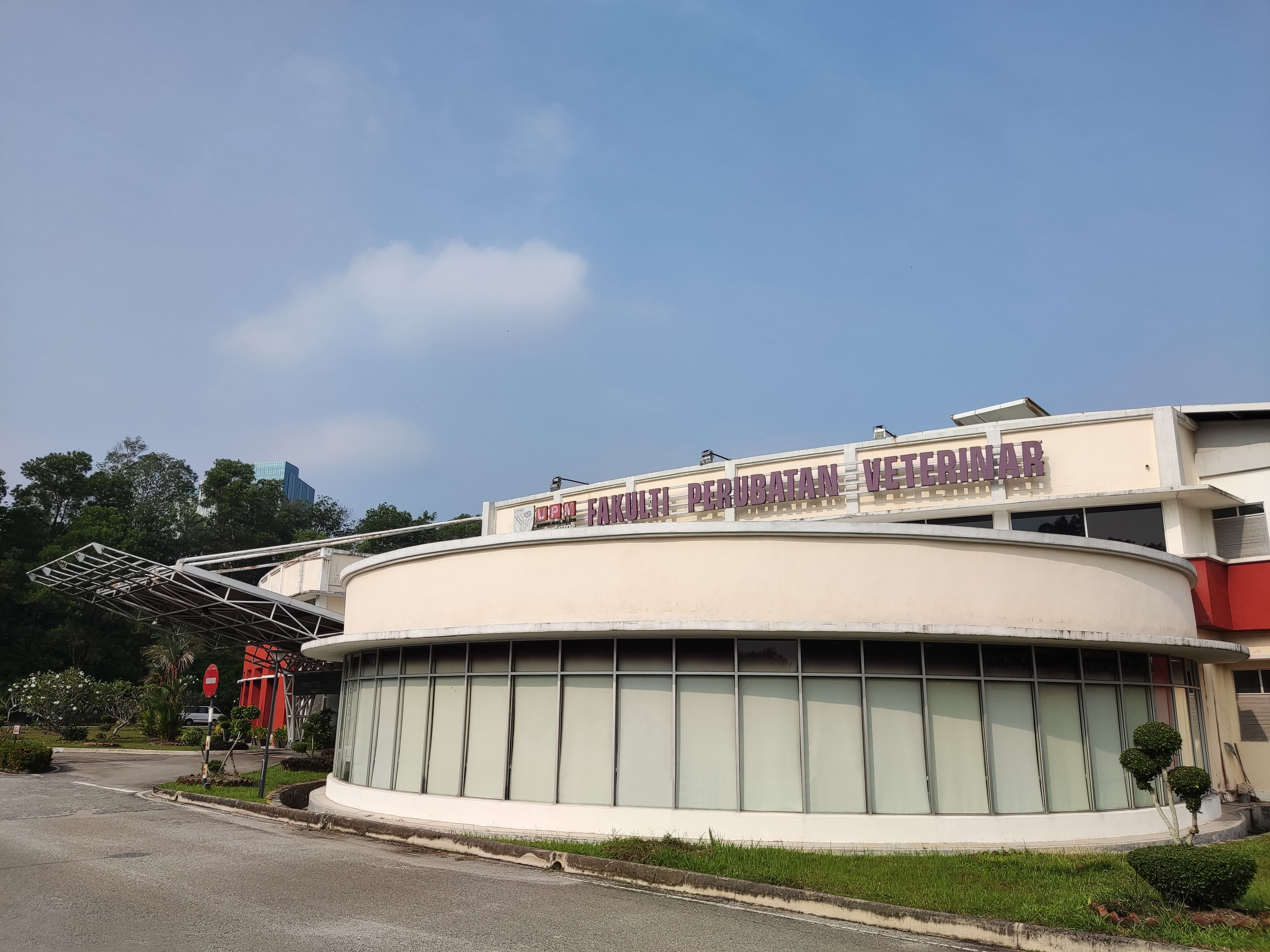
Faculty of Veterinary Medicine

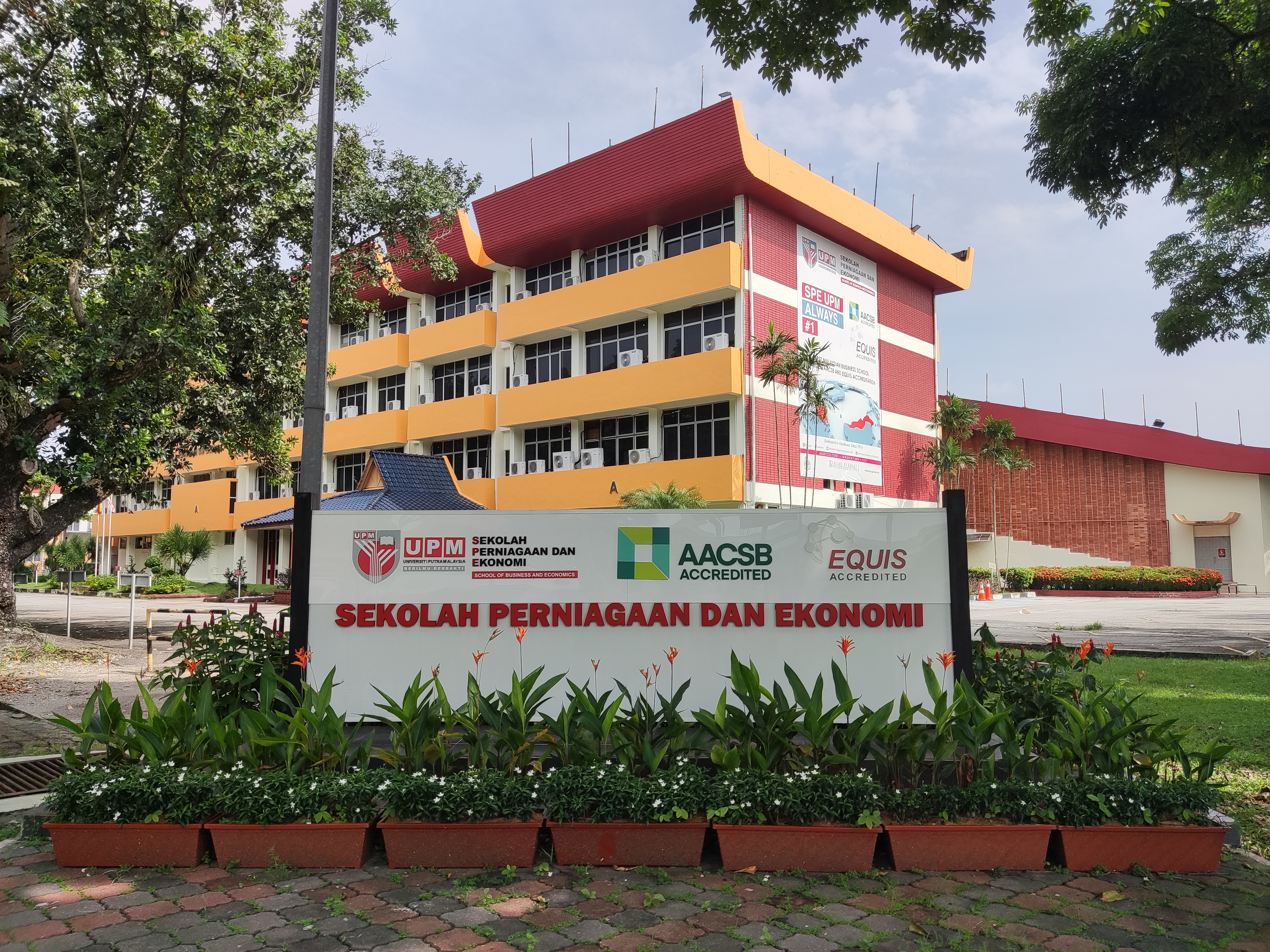
School of Business and Economics

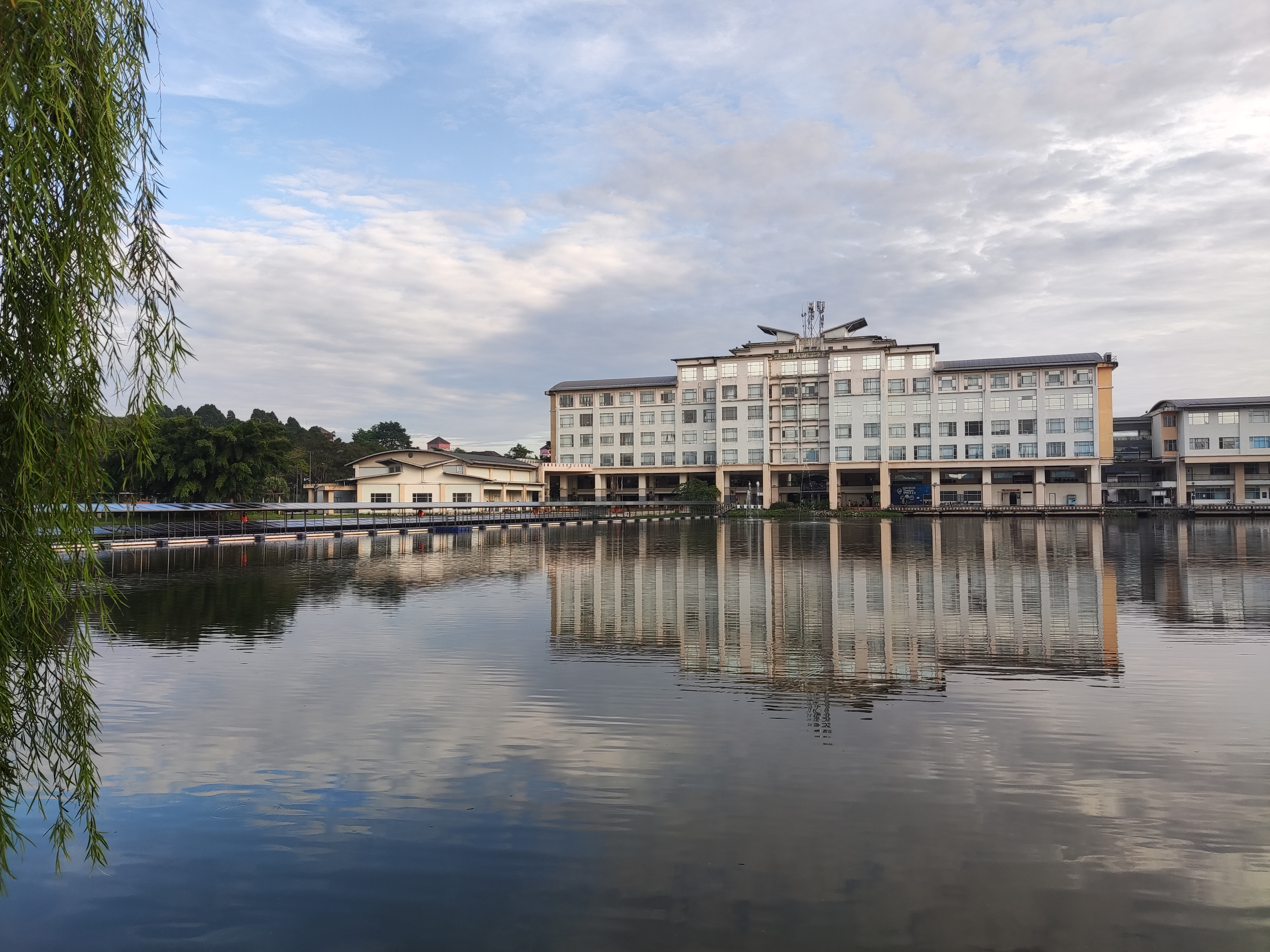
Faculty of Engineering

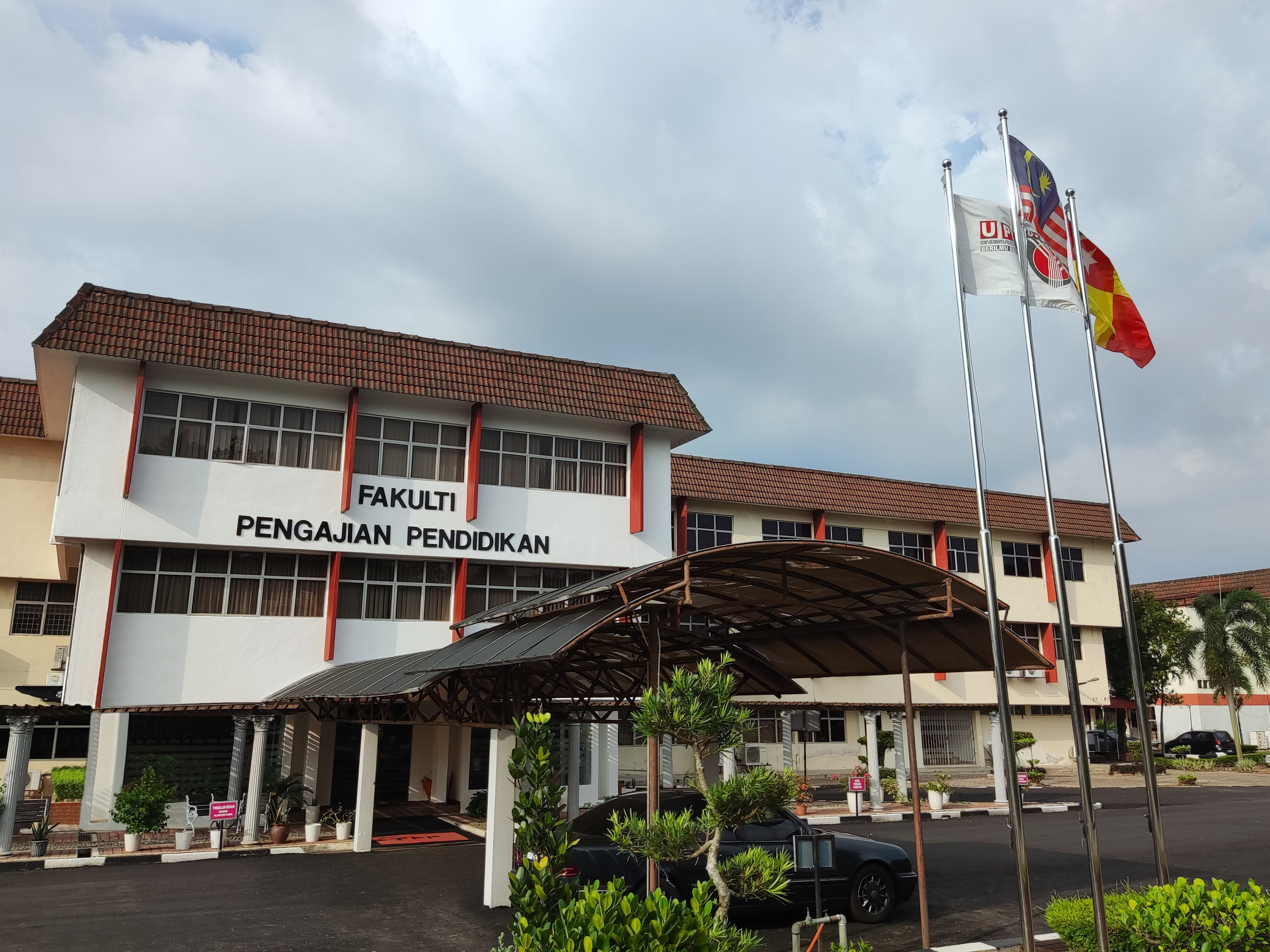
Faculty of Educational Studies

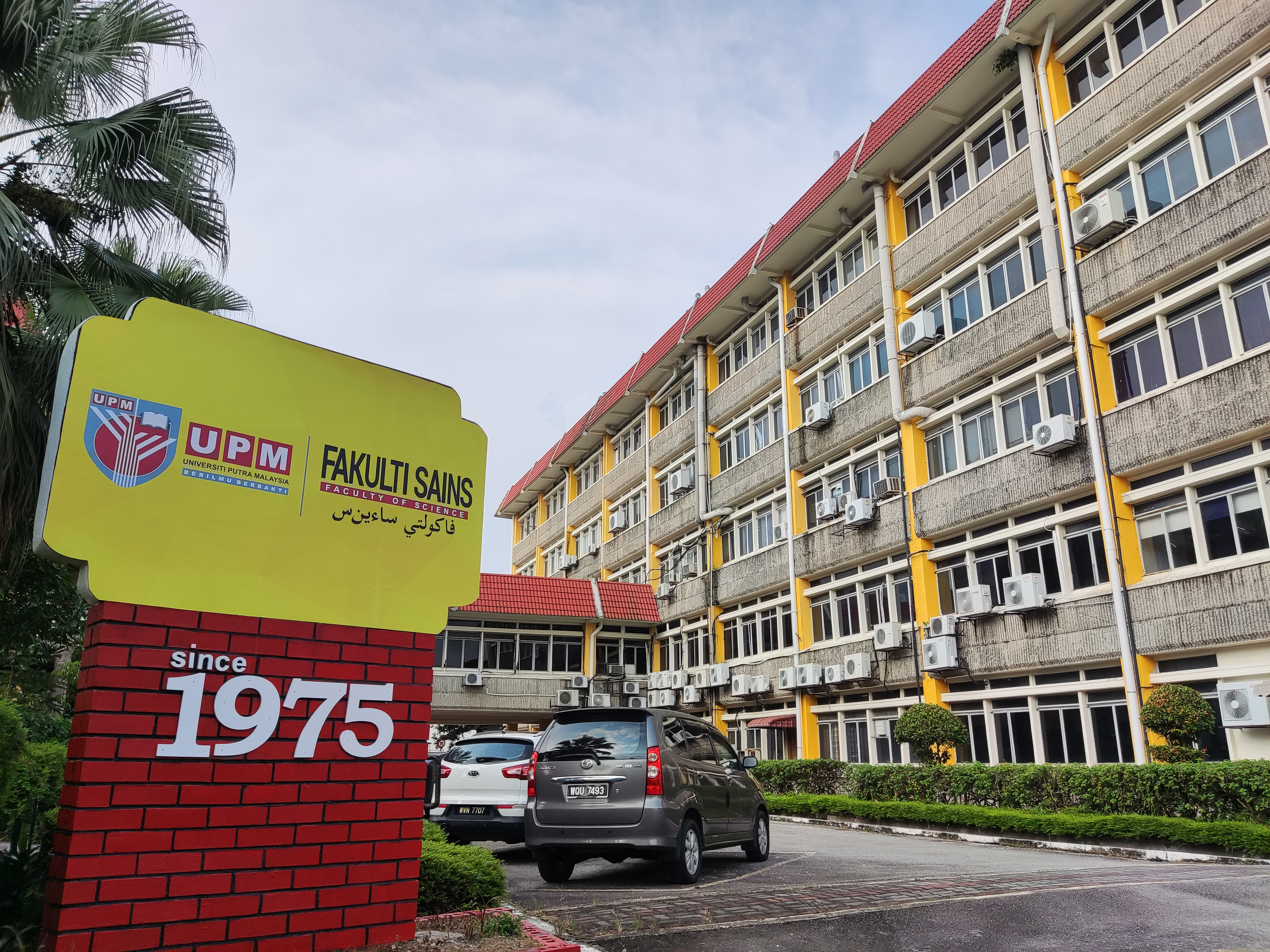
Faculty of Science

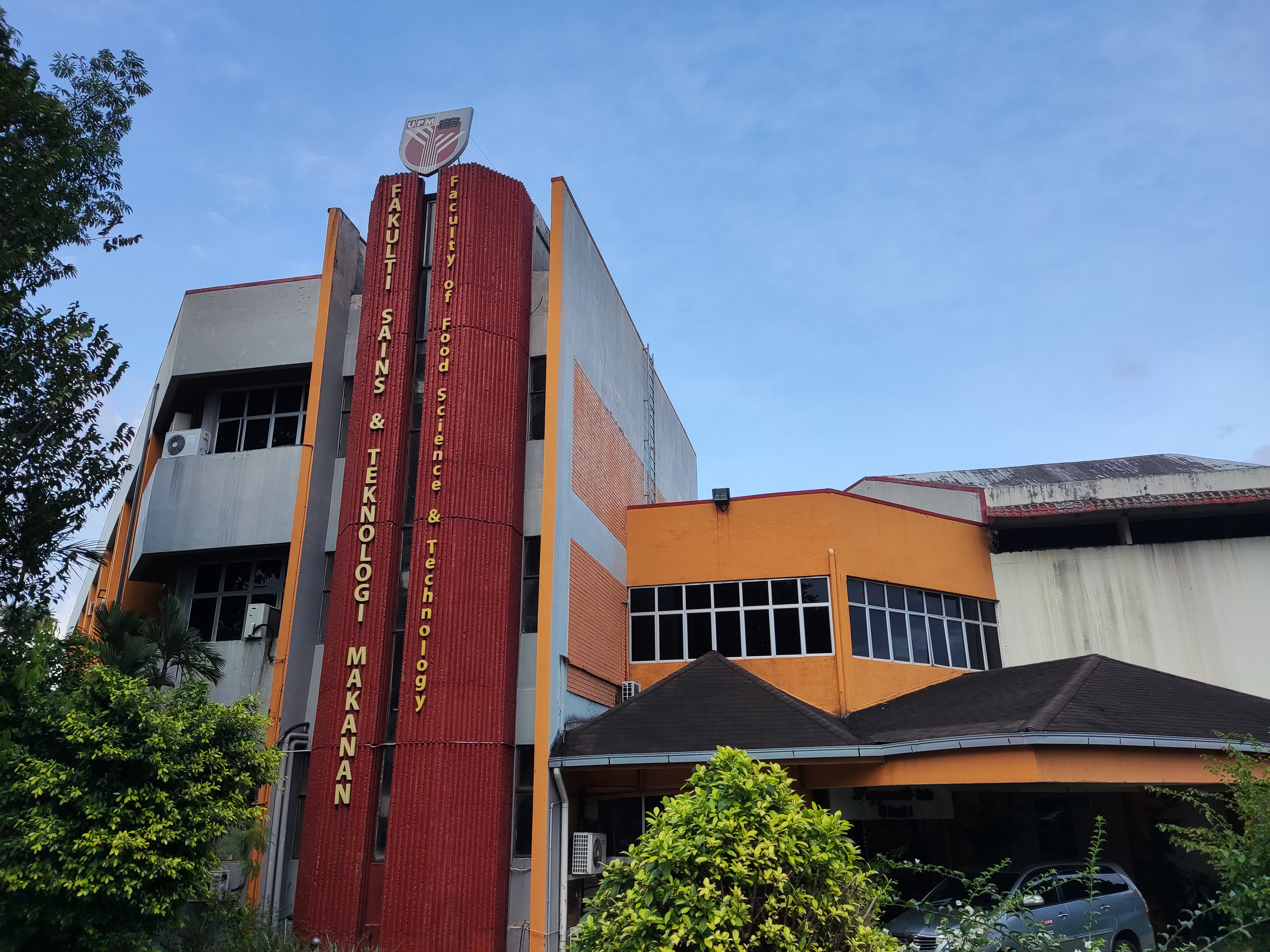
Faculty of Food Science and Technology

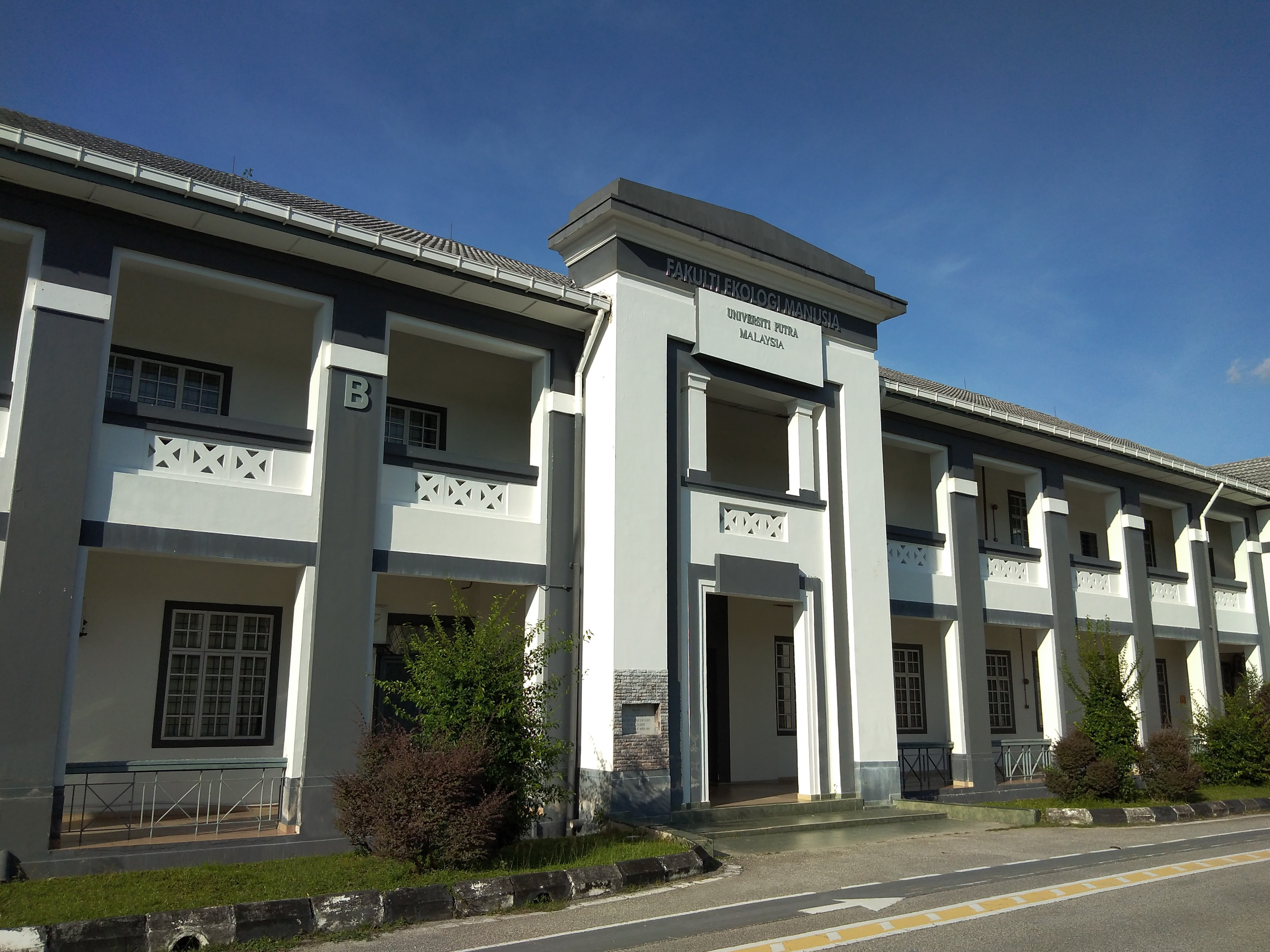
Faculty of Human Ecology

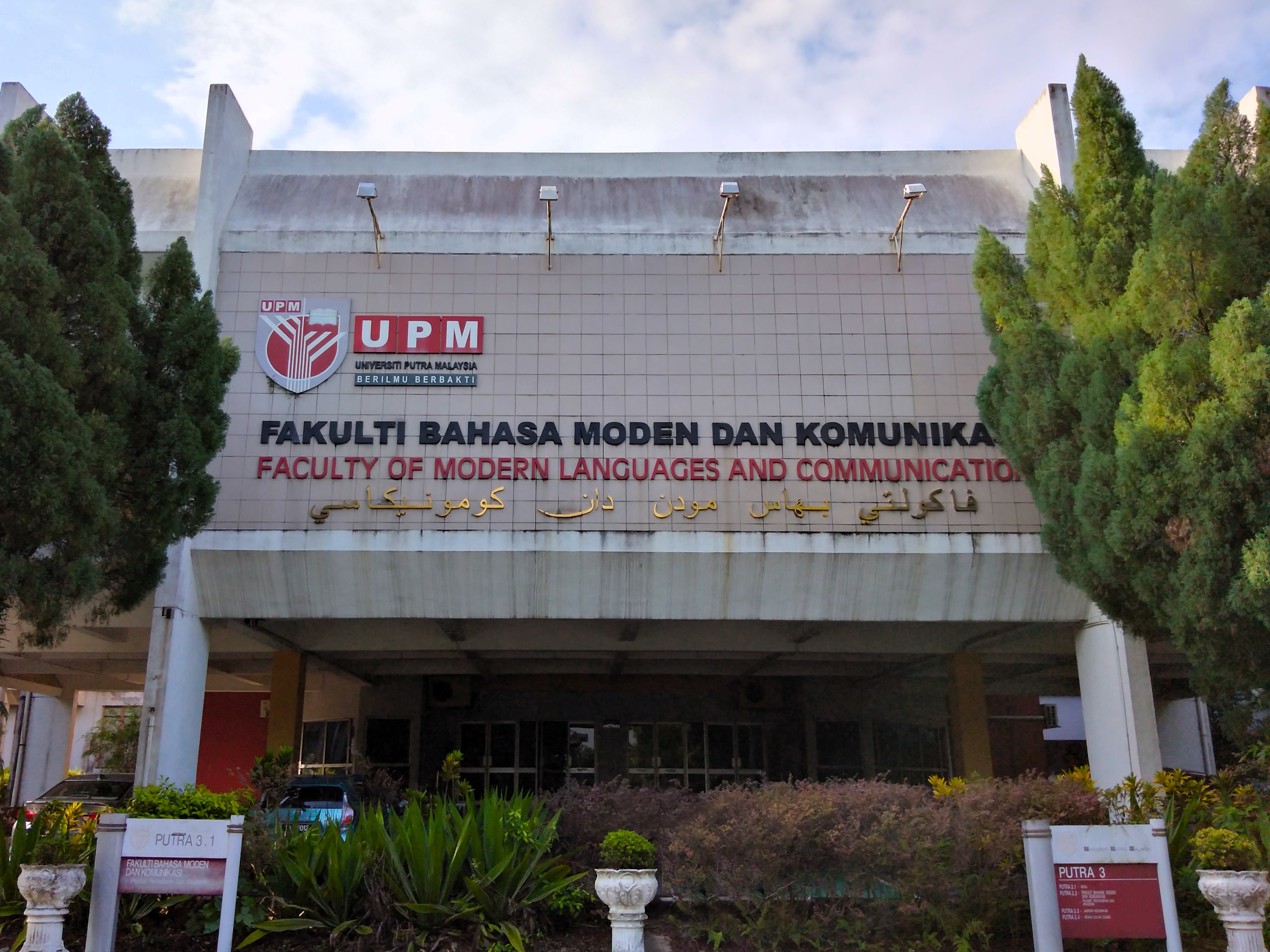
Faculty of Modern Languages and Communication

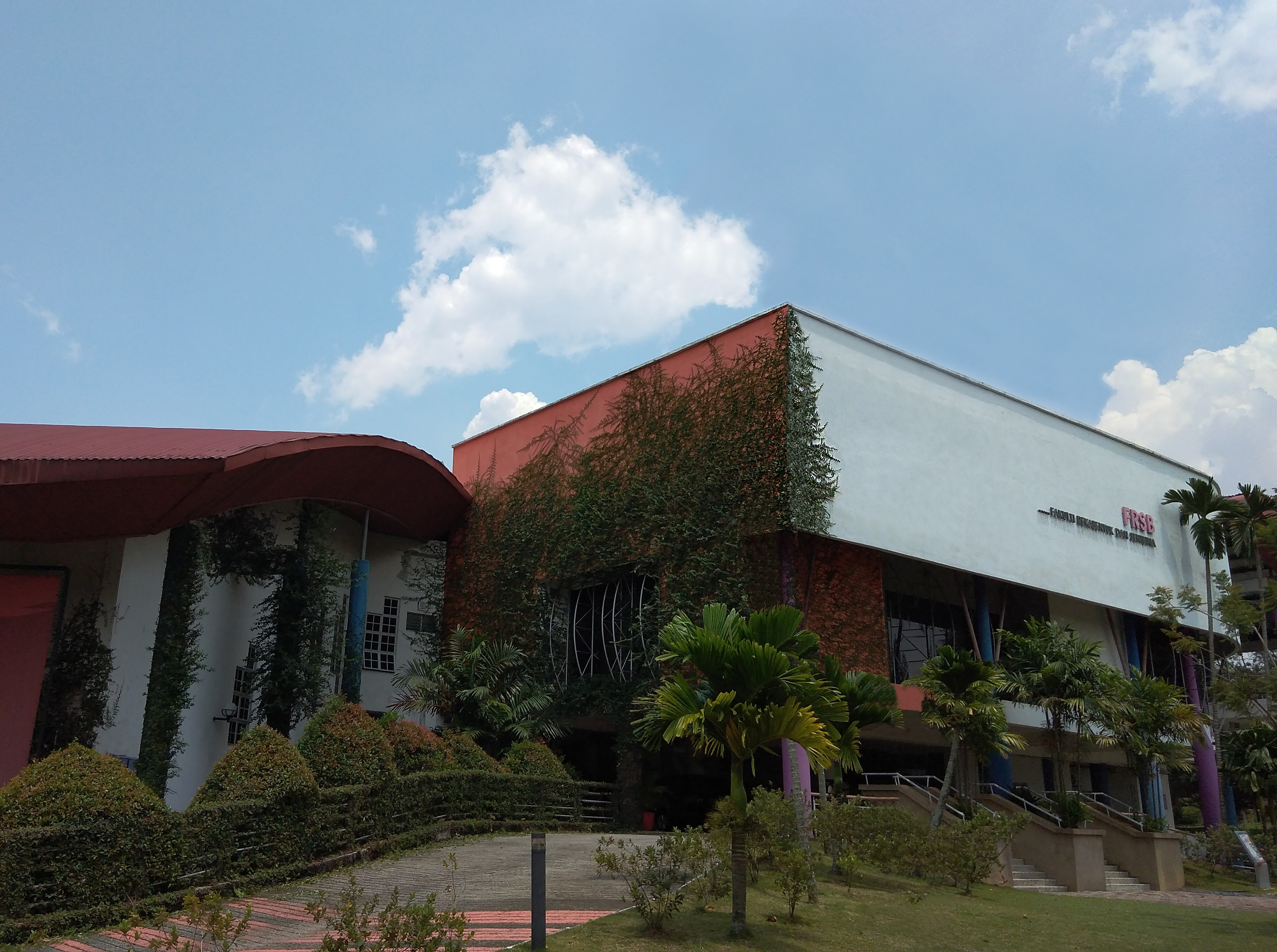
Faculty of Design and Architecture

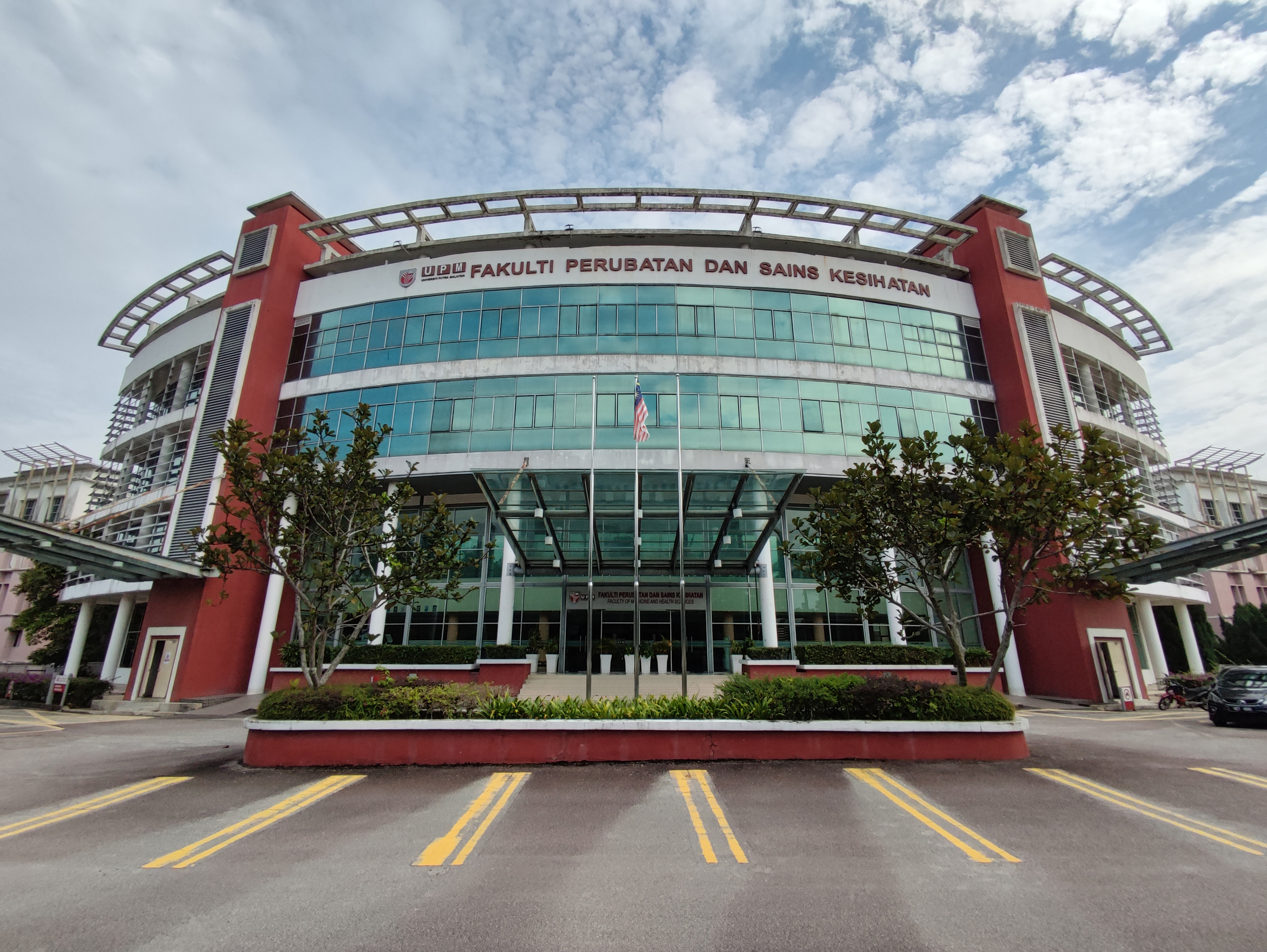
Faculty of Medicine and Health Sciences

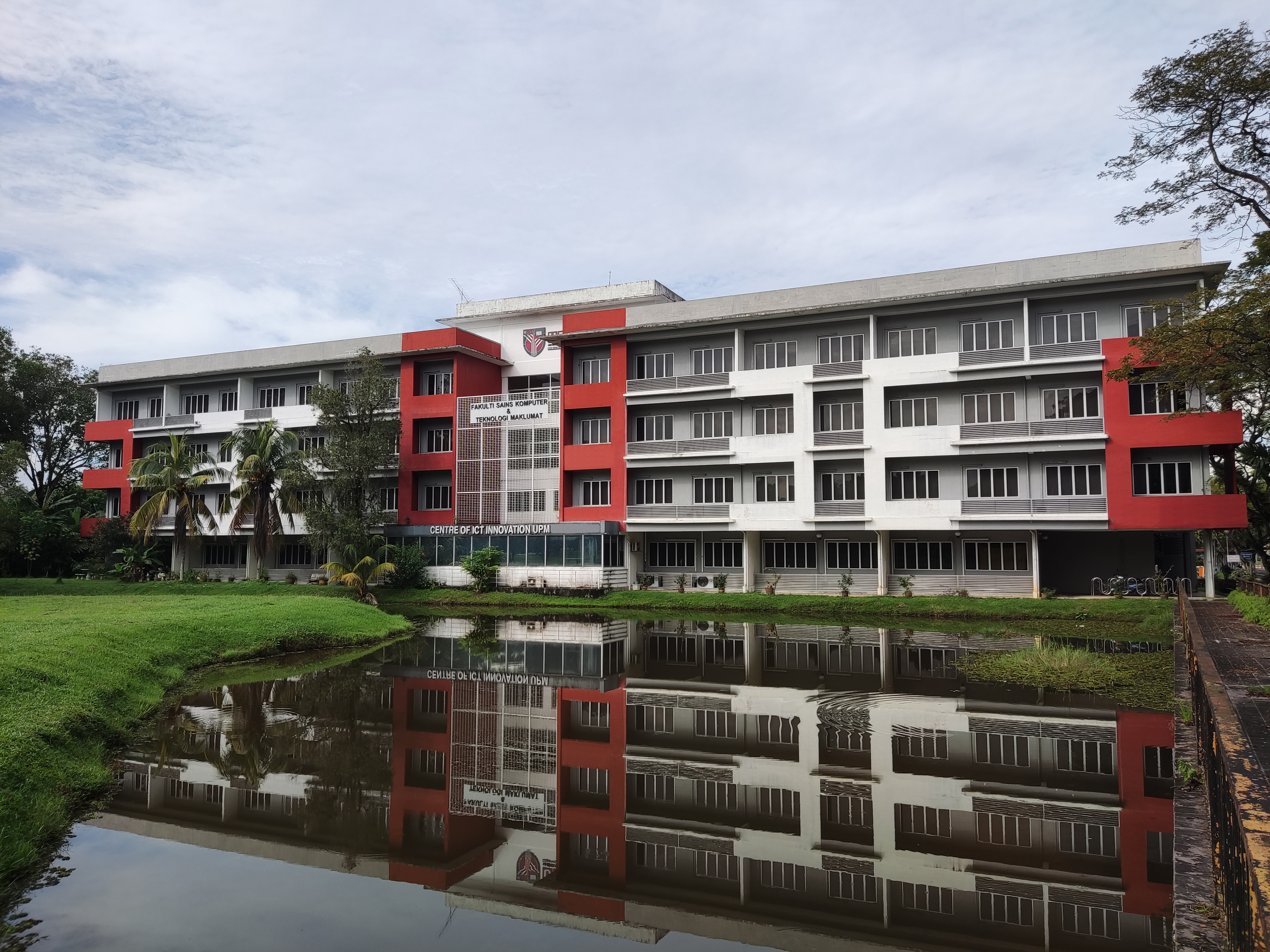
Faculty of Computer Science and Information Technology

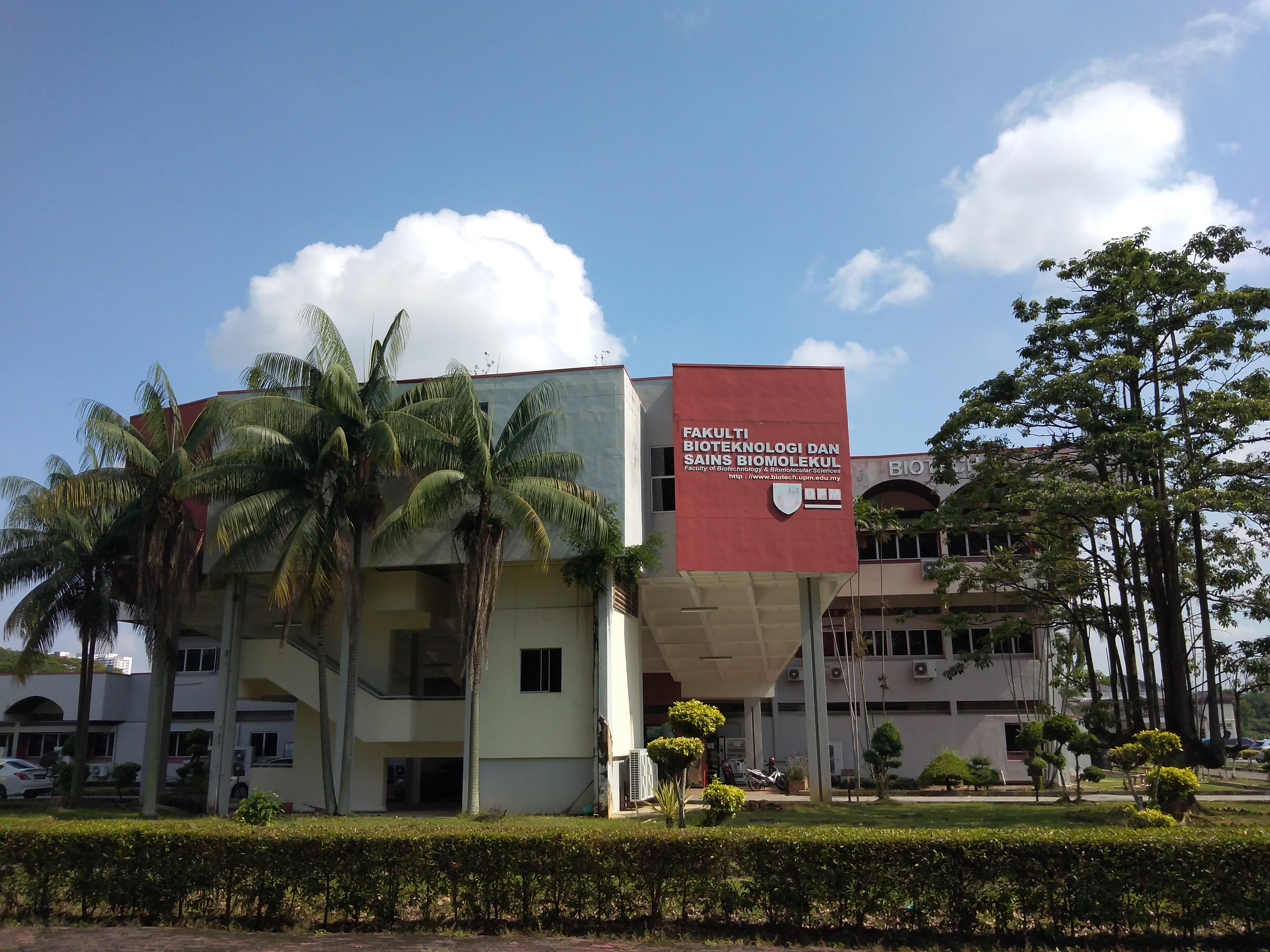
Faculty of Biotechnology and Biomolecular Sciences

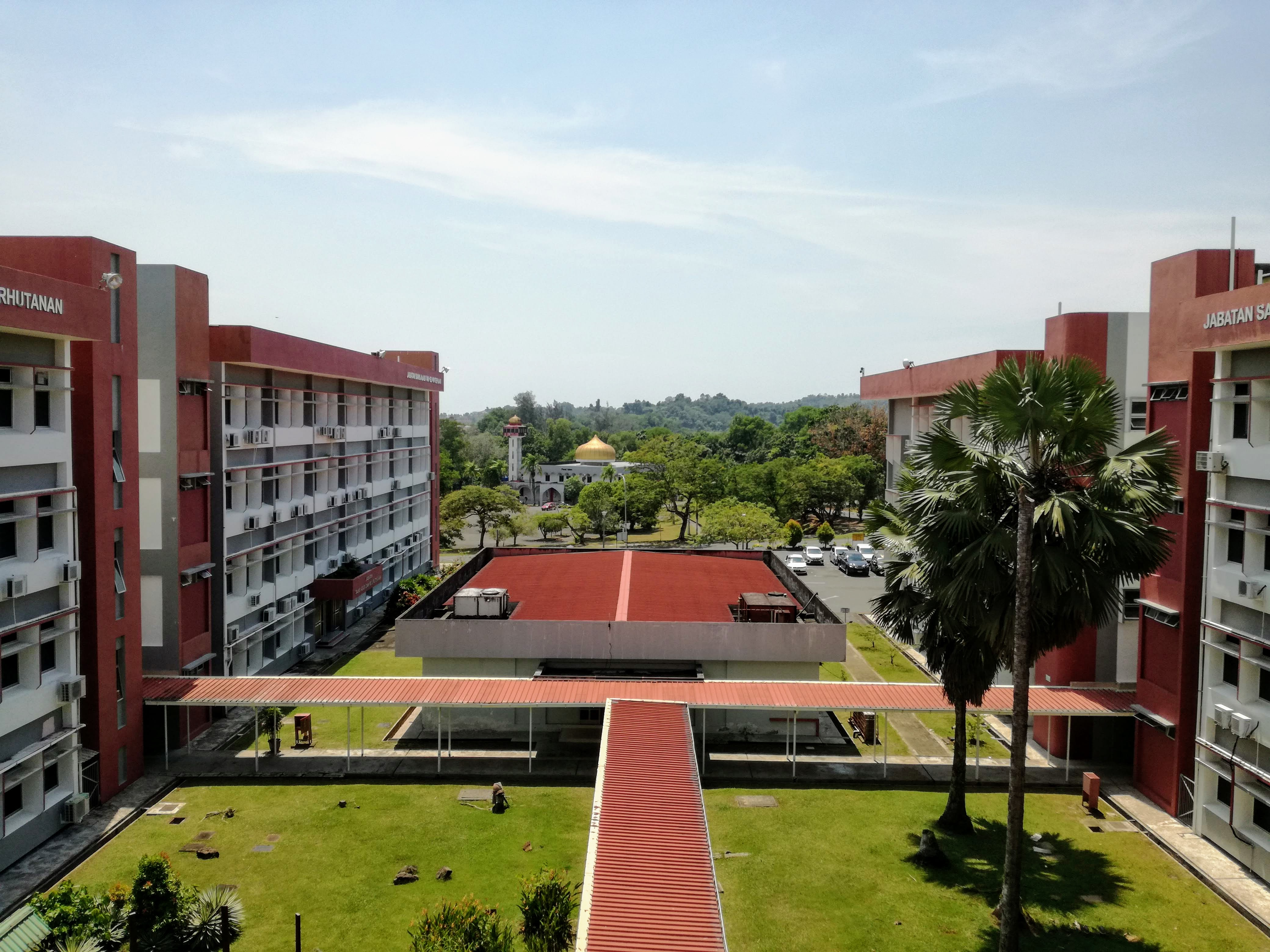
Faculty of Agricultural and Forestry Sciences & Faculty of Humanities, Management and Science

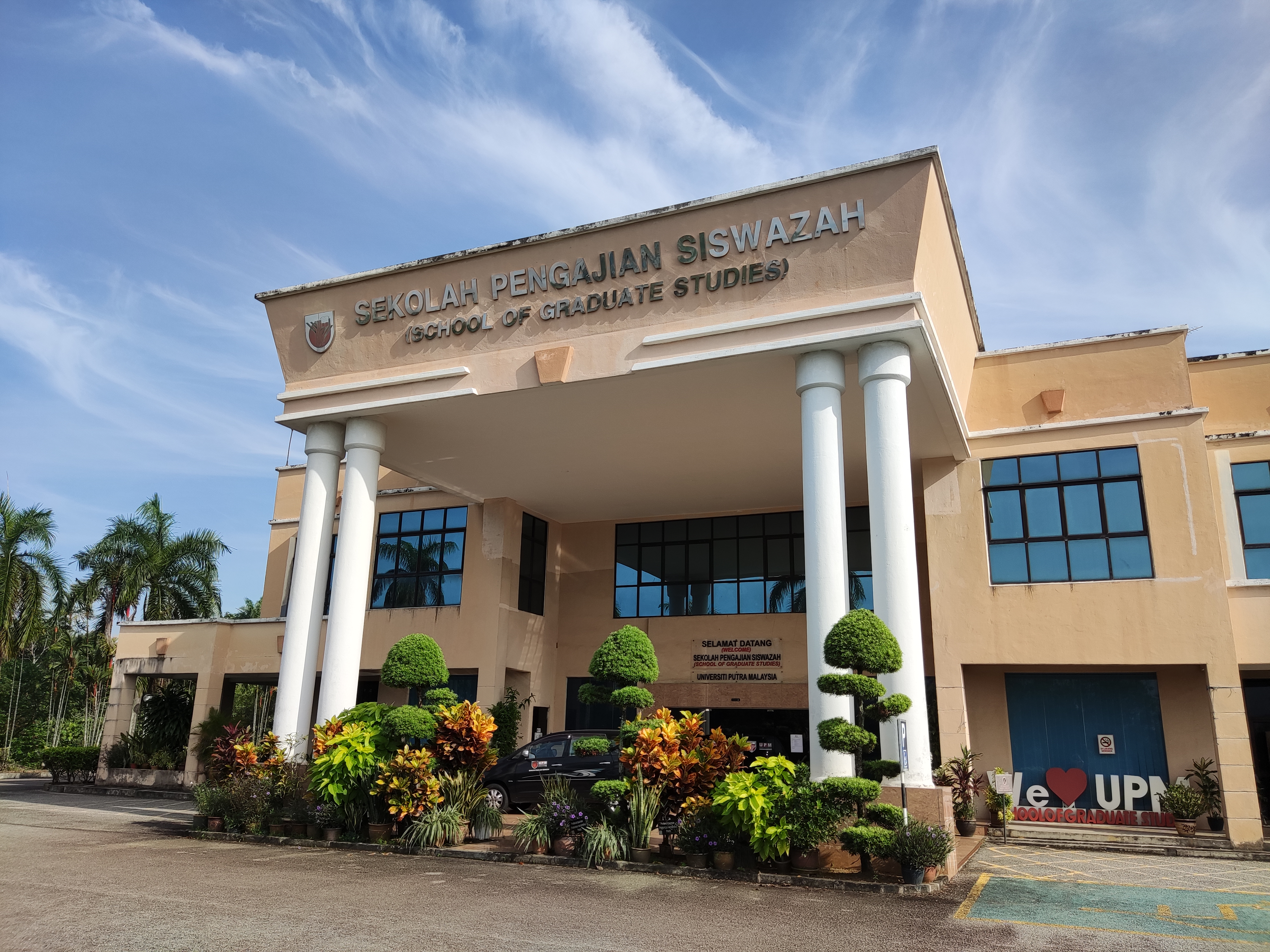
School of Graduate Studies

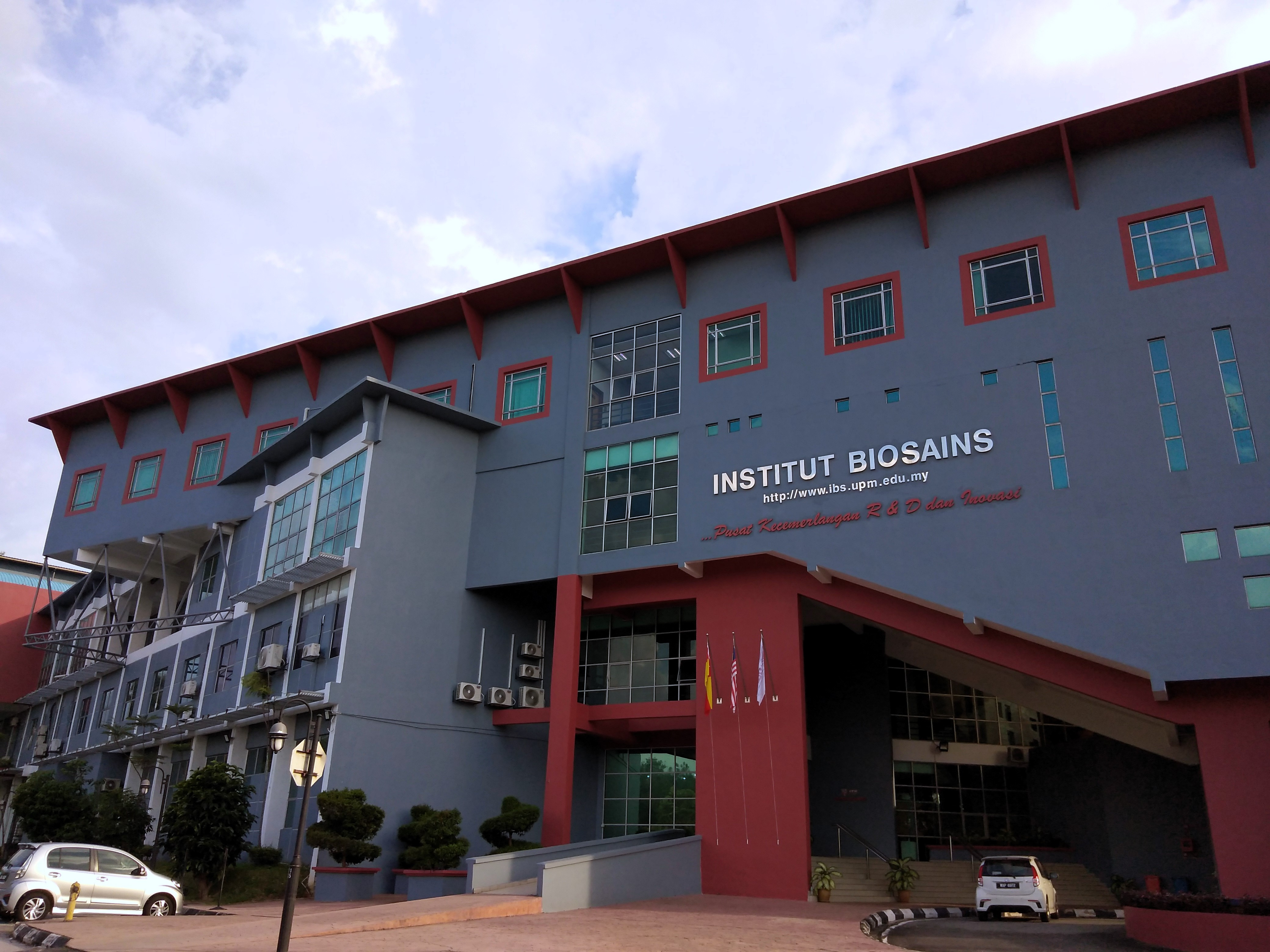
Institute of Bioscience

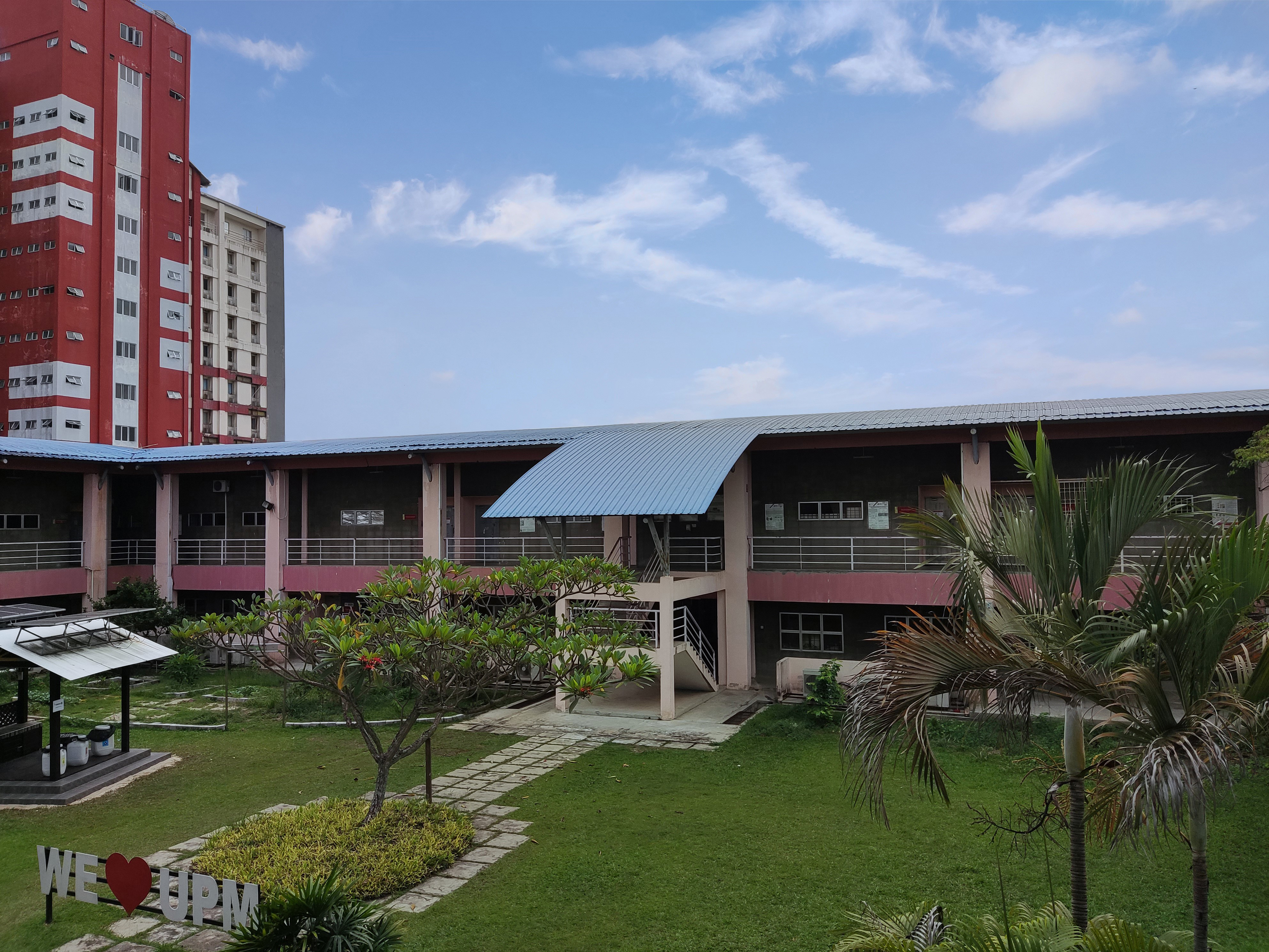
Institute of Nanoscience and Nanotechnology

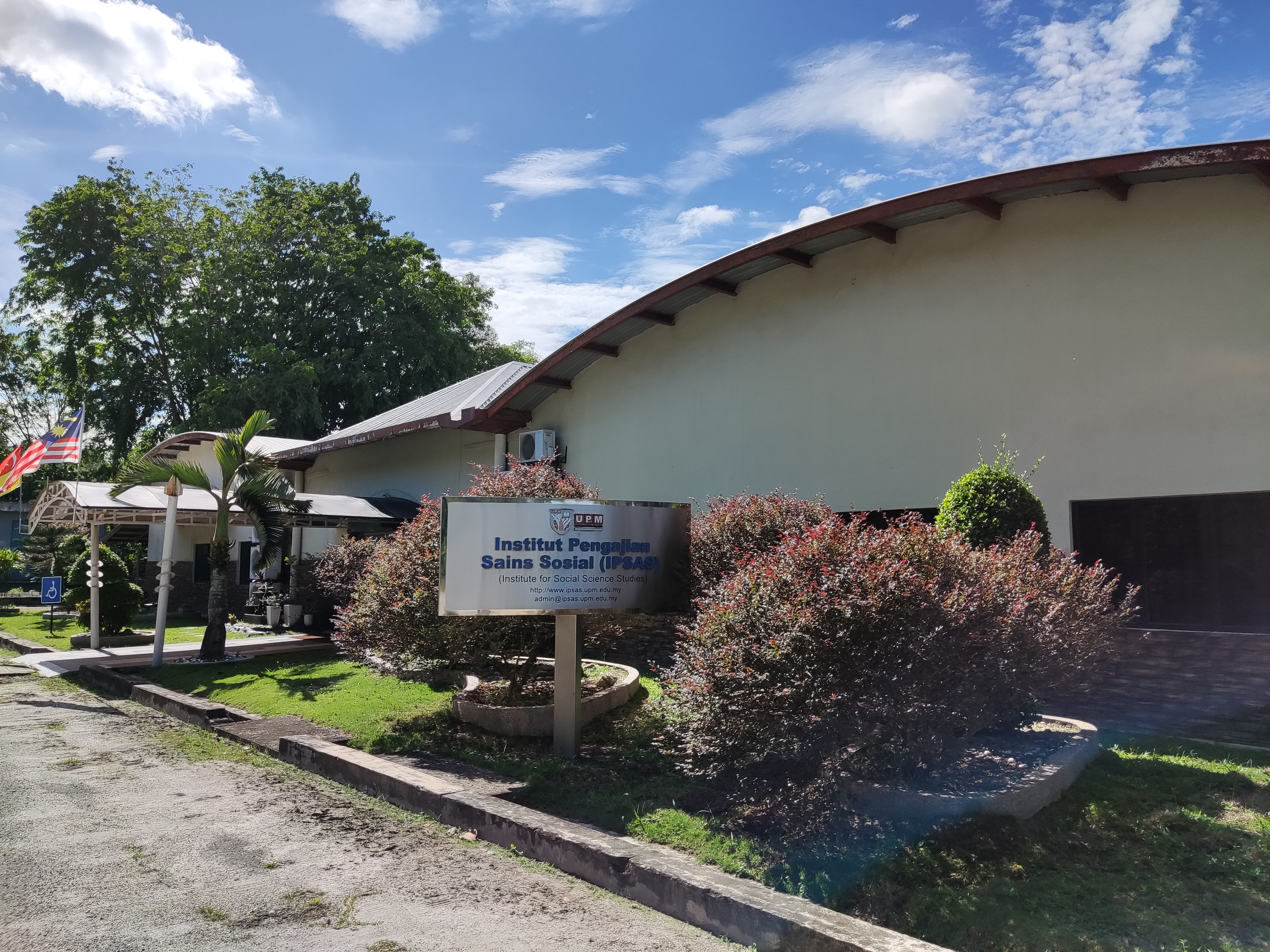
Institute for Social Science Studies

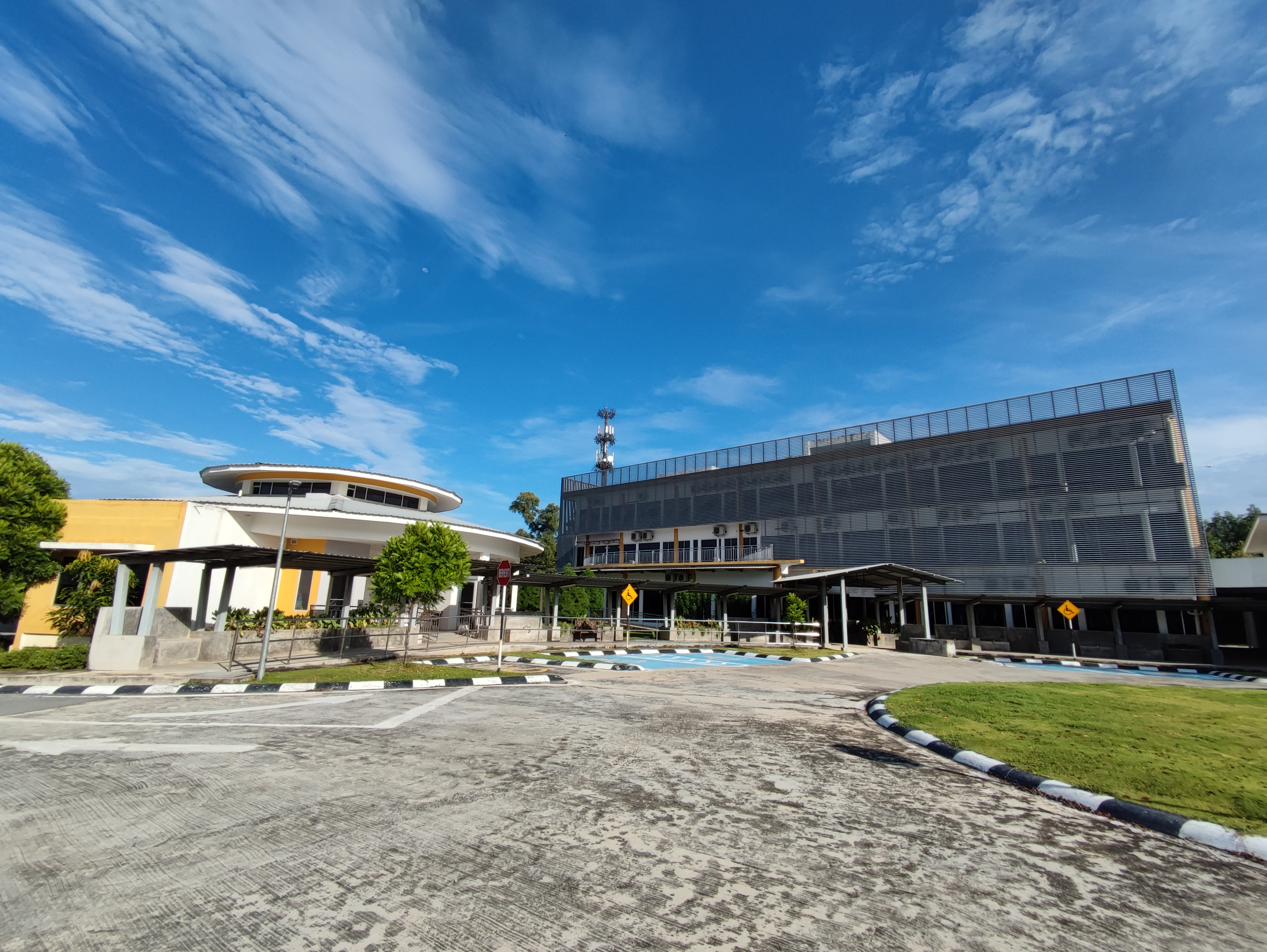
Malaysian Research Institute on Ageing

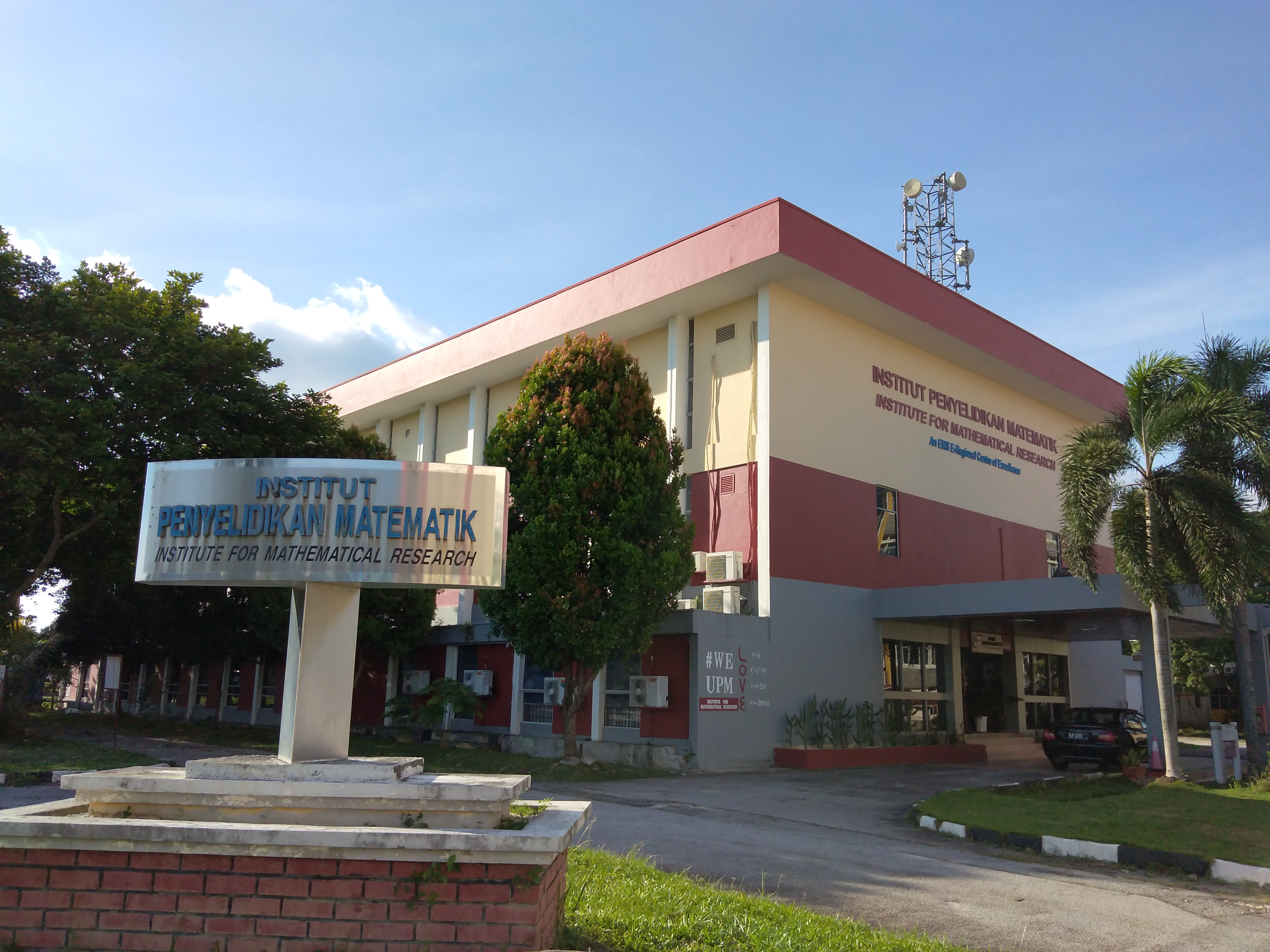
Institute for Mathematical Research

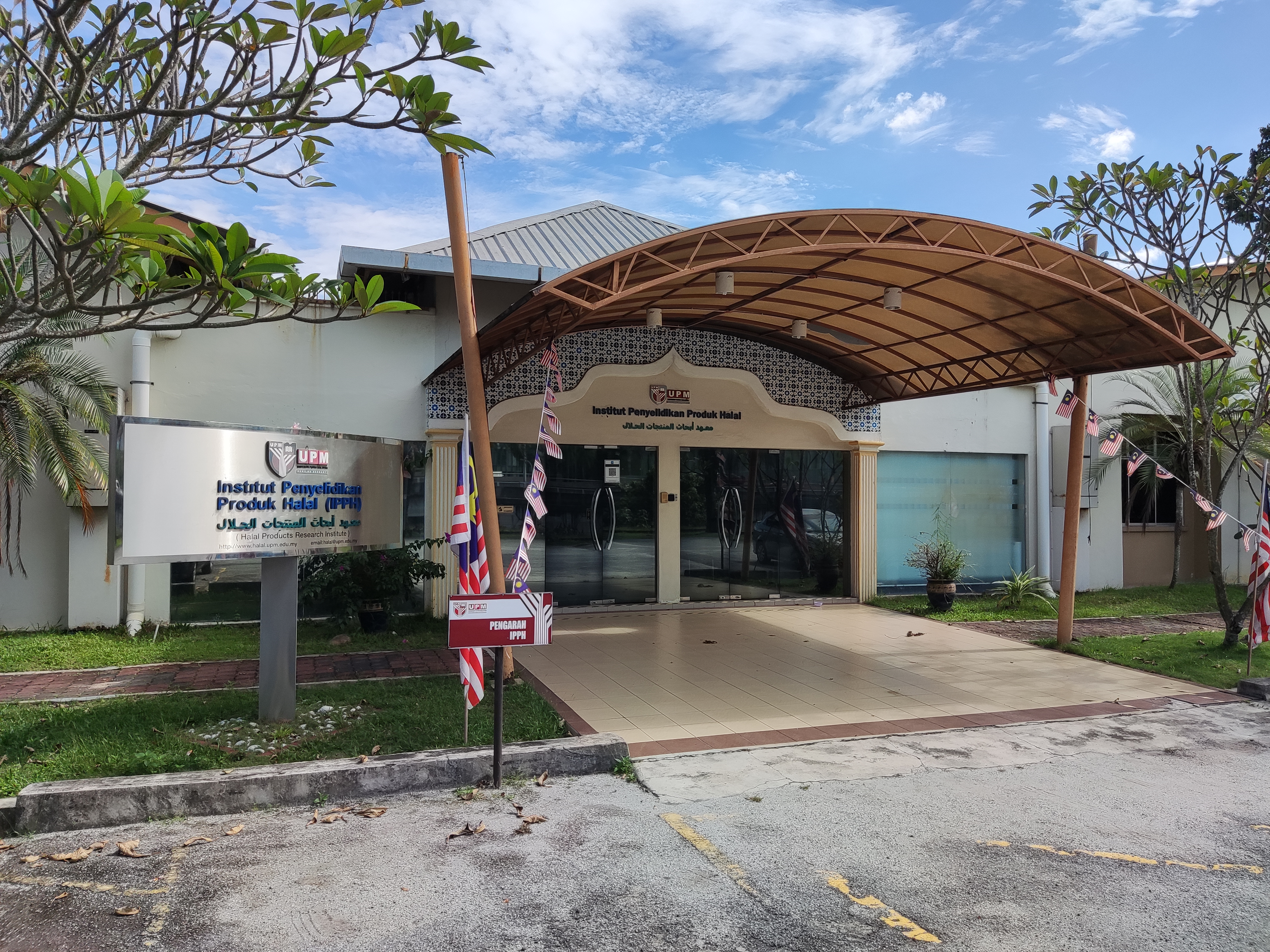
Halal Products Research Institute

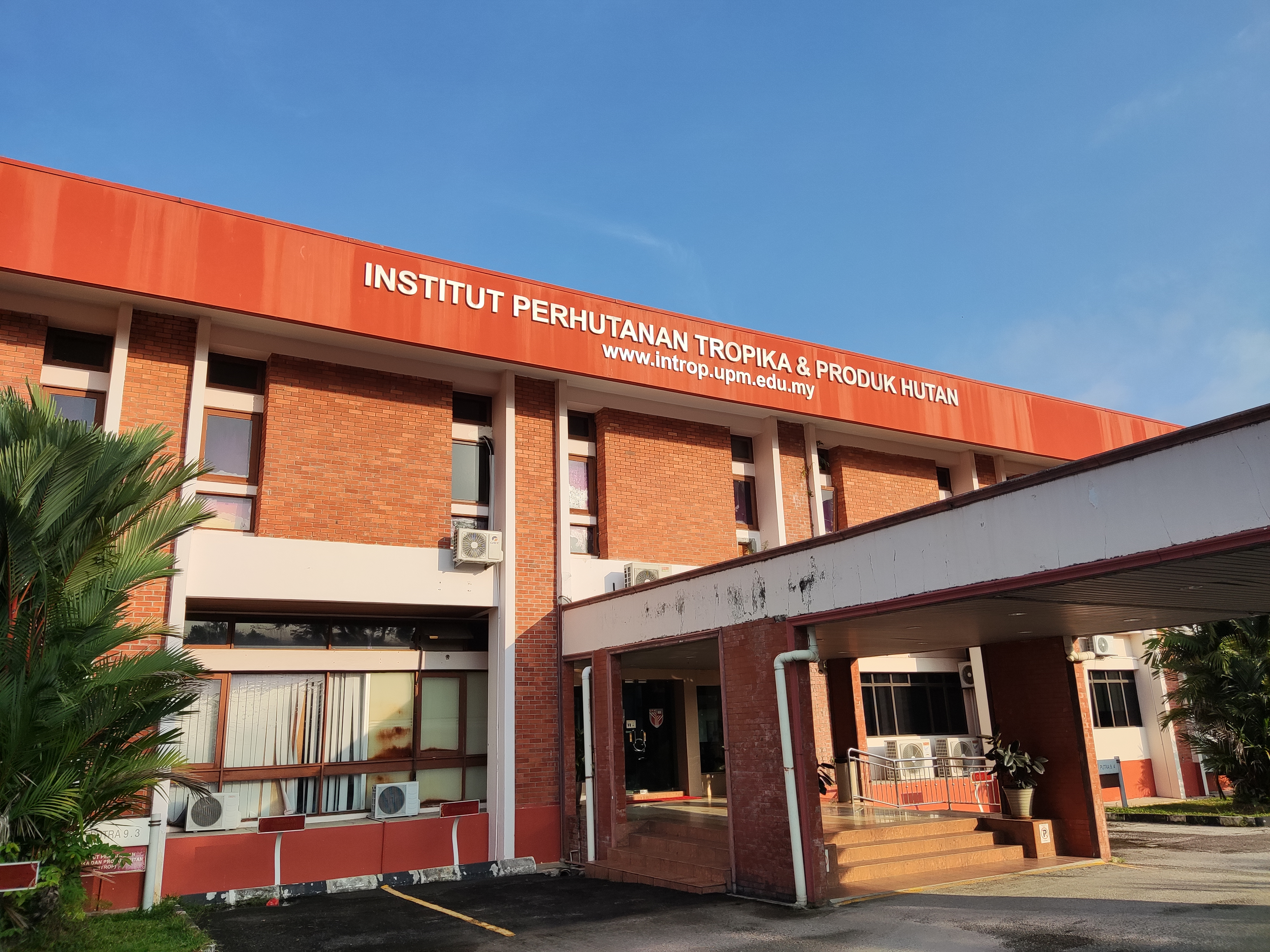
Institute of Tropical Forestry and Forest Products

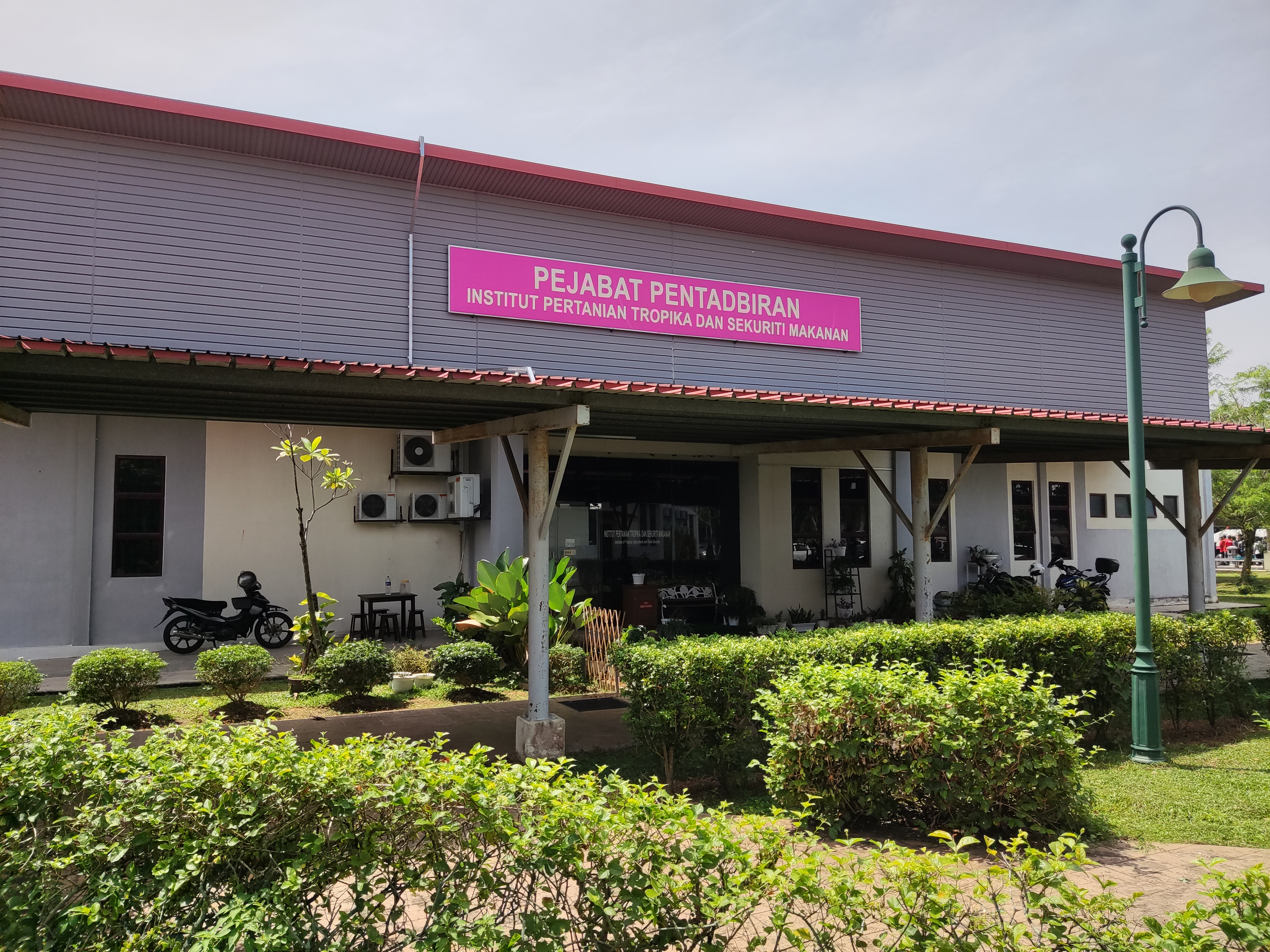
Institute of Tropical Agriculture and Food Security

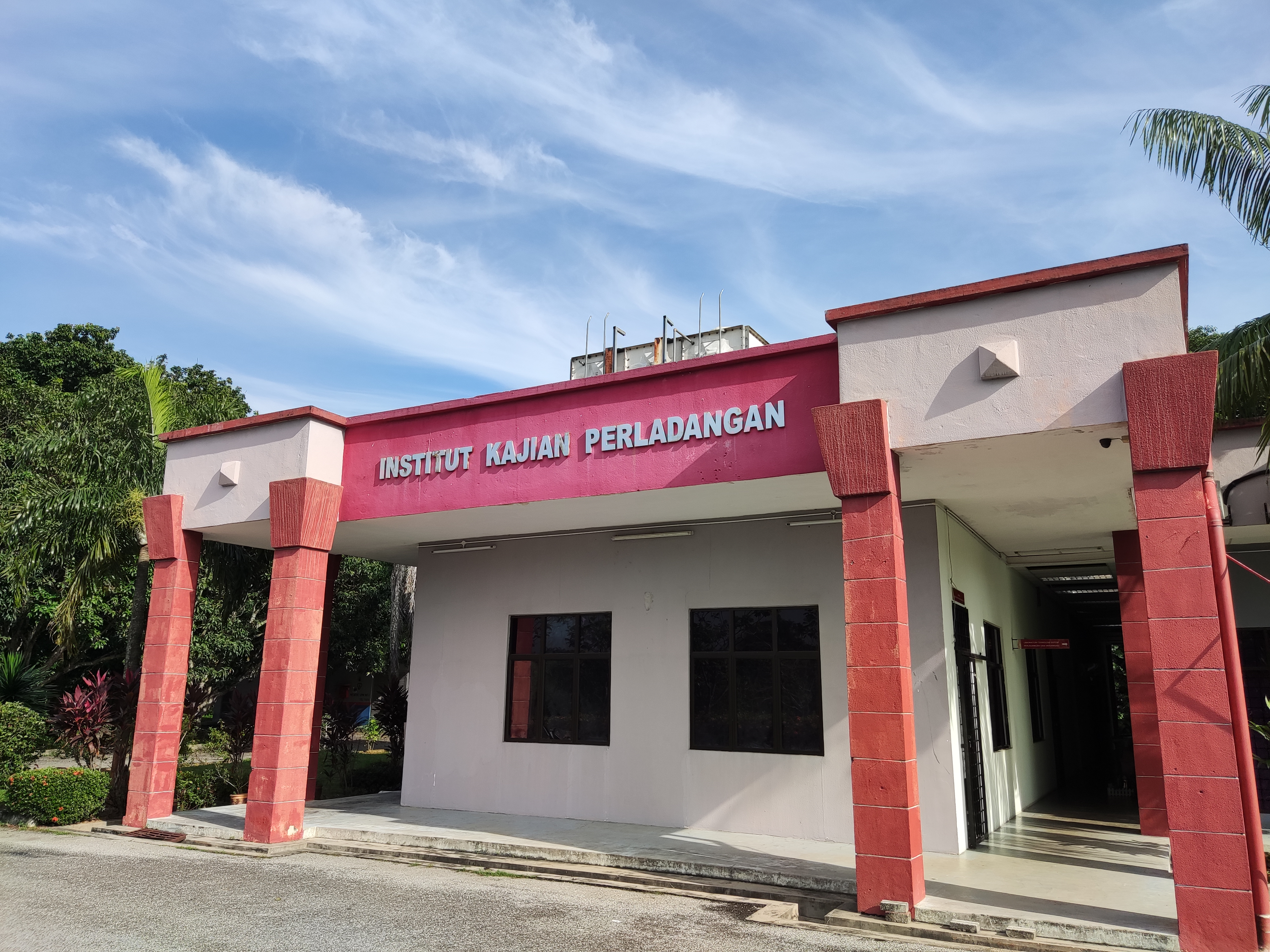
Institute of Plantation Studies

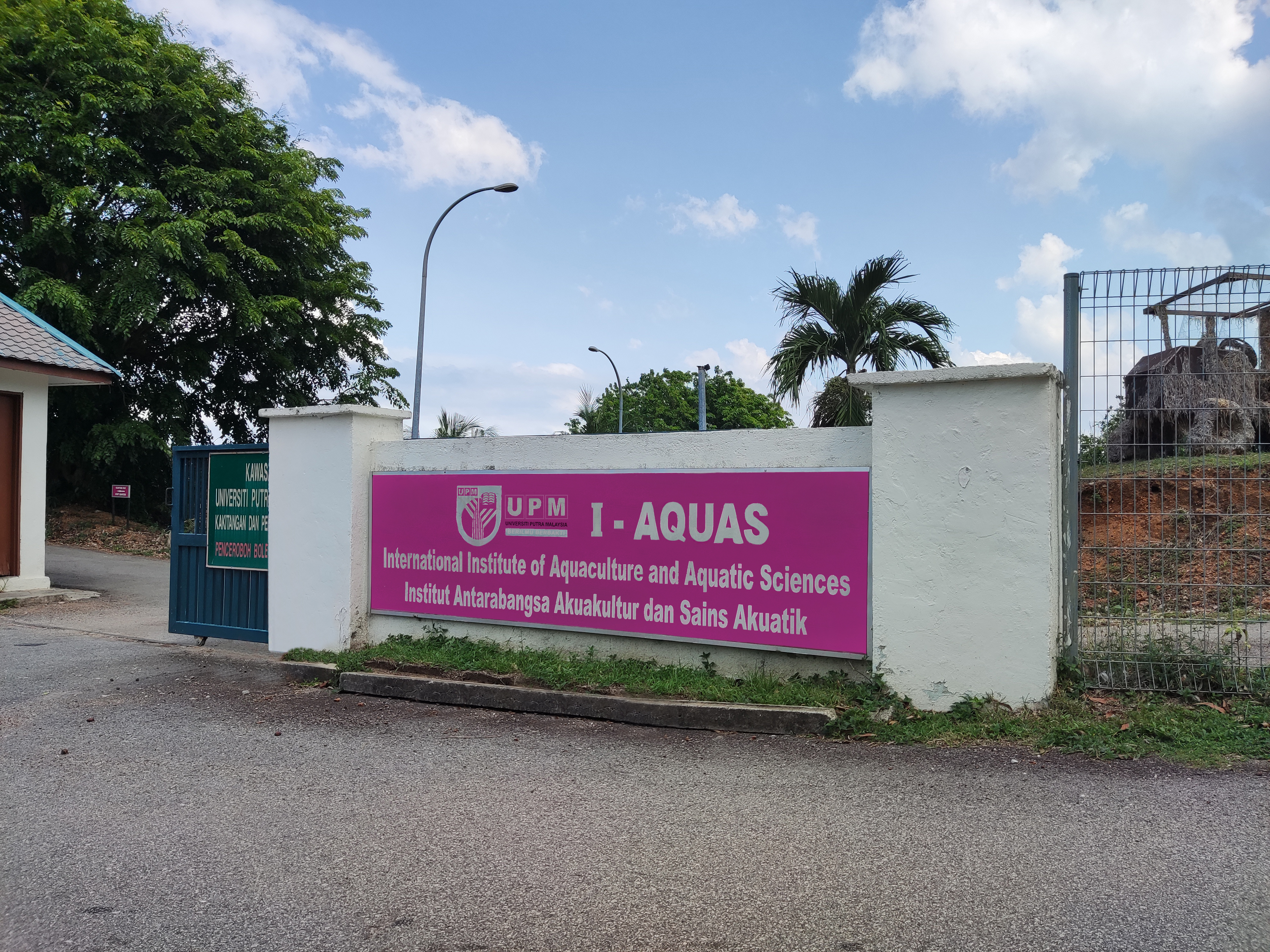
International Institute of Aquaculture and Aquatic Sciences

== Campus life ==
=== Residential colleges ===
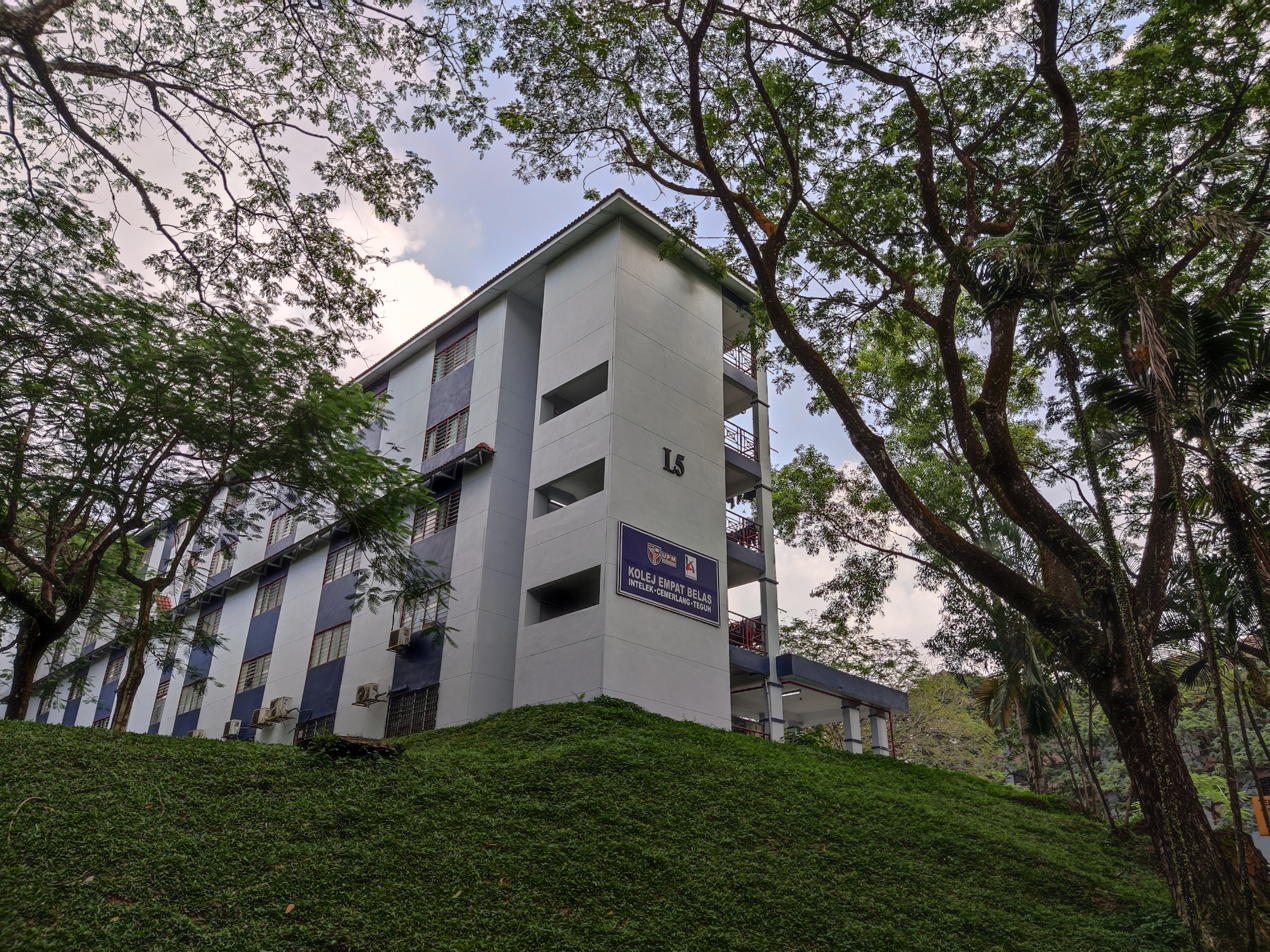
The Serumpun Colleges are consist of 11 blocks with 5 storeys each

The accommodation units in UPM are called "colleges", however, the colleges are not related to education, but built to provide accommodation for students, known as "residential college" or kolej kediaman. Before the UPM's Governance Transformation Plan, there were 17 residential colleges in Serdang campus and one in Bintulu campus. The residential colleges in Serdang campus can be divided into four zone, which are lembah, pinggiran, bukit and serumpun.

The Mohamad Rashid College (KMR) is the oldest residential college in UPM, it was once named as Kolej Kediaman Pertama. After it was renovated, it has been transformed into KMR OnePUTRA Residence and managed by UPM Holdings since 2019.

The Tenth College (K10) and the Tan Sri Mustaffa Babjee College (KMB) are two colleges at zon pinggiran because they are distant from other colleges, located at northeast and southwest of UPM respectively. K10 accommodate the students from Faculty of Engineering and Faculty of Design and Architecture while KMB accommodates the students from Faculty of Veterinary Medicine and Faculty of Medicine and Health Sciences.

The Twelfth College (K12) and Fourteenth College (K14) are located at zon serumpun and known as "Serumpun Colleges". They are built by PJS Development, a private construction company through the form of BOT. Currently, part of Serumpun zone is now included into Tan Sri Aishah Ghani College as KTAG zone B.

The Tan Sri Aishah Ghani College (KTAG), formerly known as Thirteen College (K13) and Kolej Matrikulasi (KOMAT), has undergone several mergers and name changes over the years.

The Sri Rajang College (KSR) is the only residential college in Bintulu campus, consists of 10 blocks that could accommodate up to 1,560 students.

The Governance Transformation Plan in 2019 has restructured the residential colleges in Serdang campus. Most of them have been merged with another college to save costs and improve administrative efficiency. As of 2024, the list of residential colleges which are managed by UPM is as follow:

1. Tun Dr. Ismail College (KTDI)
2. Chancellor College (KC)
3. Sultan Alaeddin Suleiman Shah College (KOSASS)
4. Pendeta Za'ba College (KPZ)
5. Tenth College (K10)
6. Twelfth College (K12)
7. Tan Sri Aishah Ghani College (KTAG)
8. Fourteenth College (K14)
9. Tan Sri Mustaffa Babjee College (KTMB)
10. Sri Rajang College (KSR)

=== Libraries ===
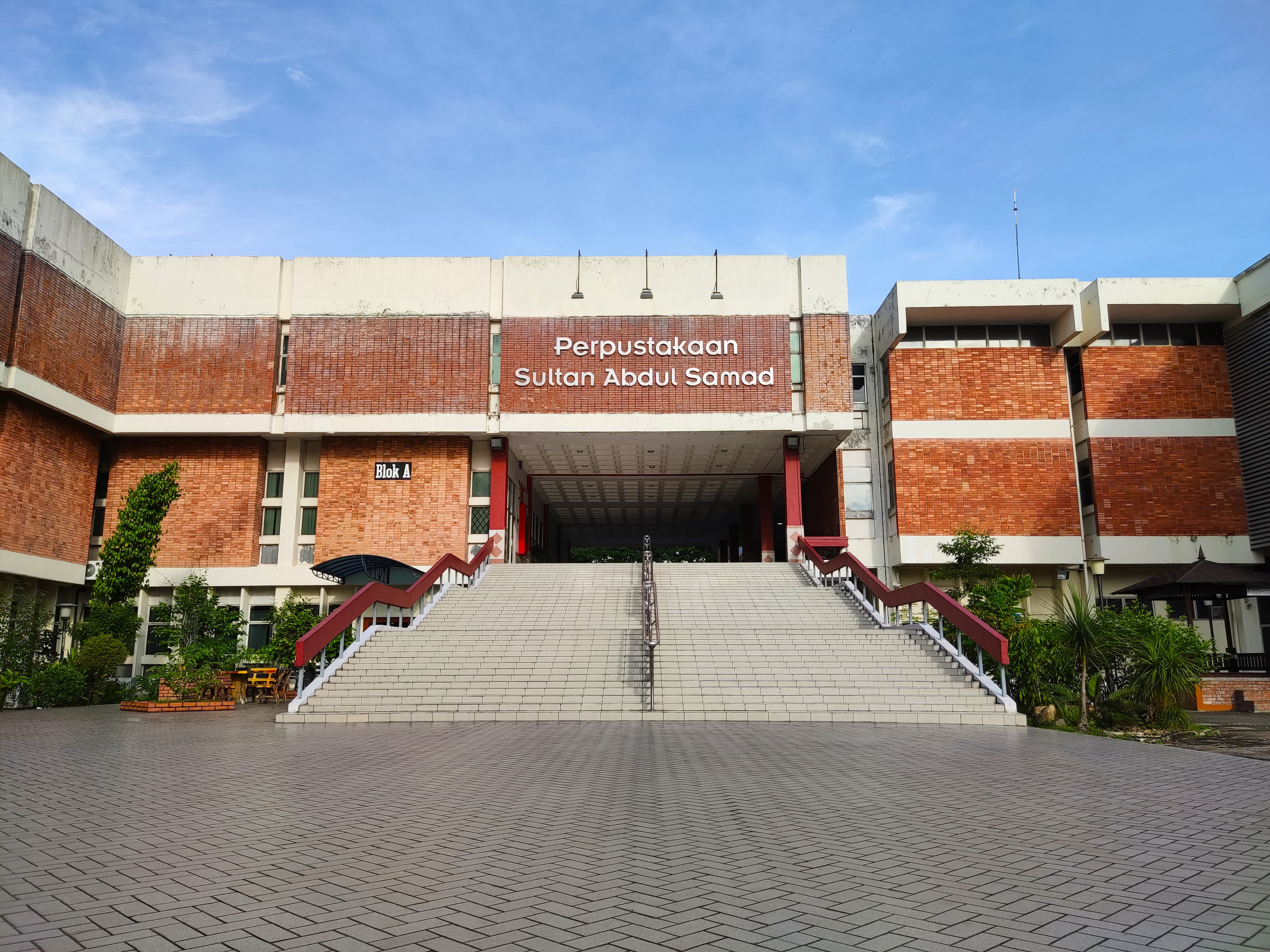
The main library of UPM

UPM has one main library and three branch libraries in Serdang campus, and one library in Bintulu campus.

The Sultan Abdul Samad Library (Malay: Perpustakaan Sultan Abdul Samad, abbreviation: PSAS) is the main library of UPM. It existed before the establishment of UPM in 1971. The library was renamed the Sultan Abdul Samad Library and inaugurated on 23 May 2002, named after Sultan Abdul Samad, the fourth Sultan of Selangor. PSAS consists of block A and B (completed in 1982 and 1969 respectively), with total floor area of 19,007 square metres. The Anjung Siswazah located at block B is a space specially for postgraduate students, its collection are including printed materials, media and electronics.

Another three branch libraries in Serdang campus are Medicine and Health Sciences Library (1998), Veterinary Medicine Library (1999), and Engineering and Architecture Library (2008). The library in Bintulu start operating when the campus was reopened in 2001. The operating hour of each library might varying based on the academic period of semester.

=== Main hall ===
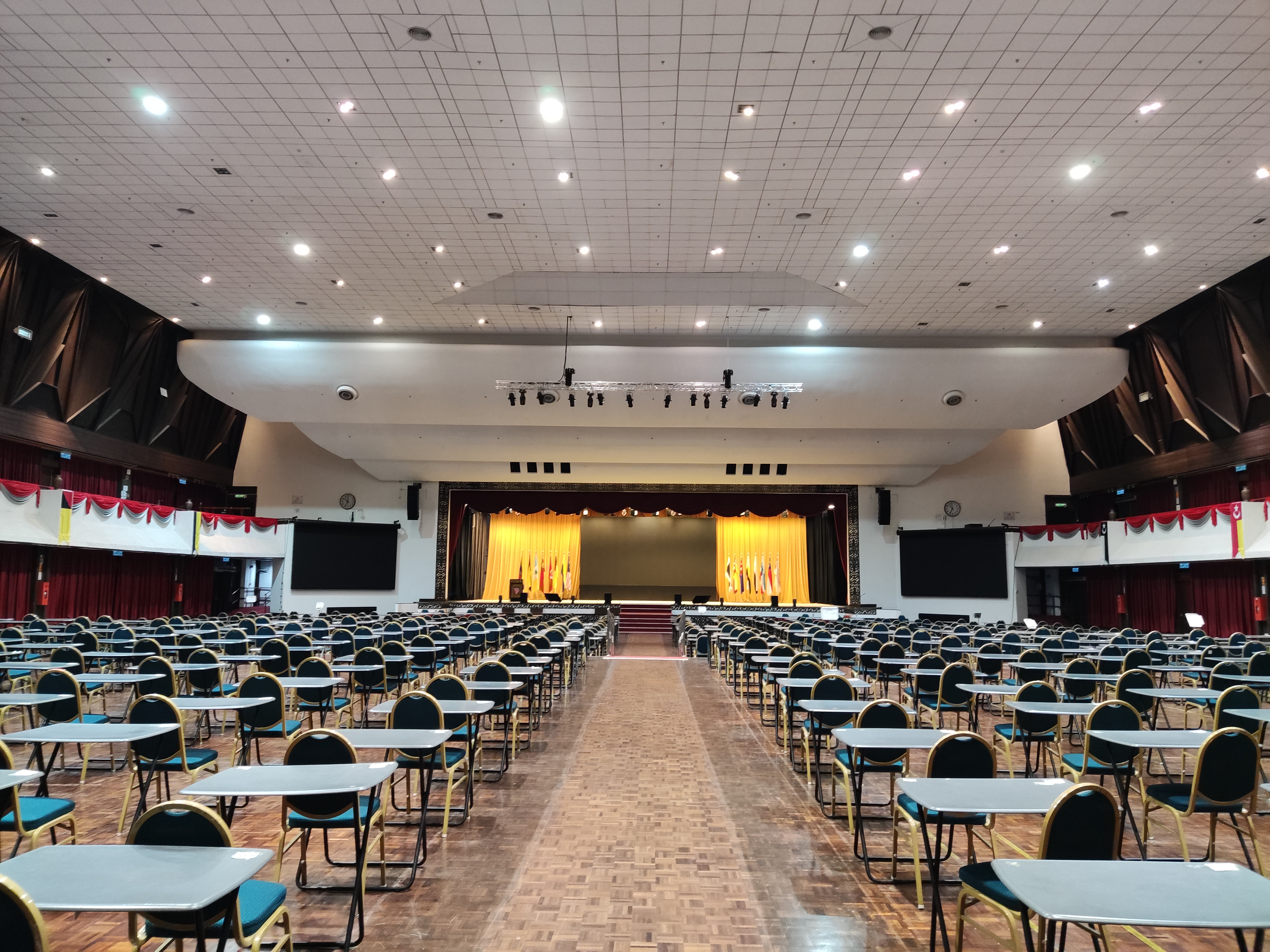
The main hall of UPM

The Sultan Salahuddin Abdul Aziz Shah Arts and Cultural Centre (Malay: Pusat Kebudayaan dan Kesenian Sultan Salahuddin Abdul Aziz Shah, abbreviation: PKKSSAAS) is the main hall in Serdang campus. It was completed in 1978 and known as the Great Hall of UPM (Dewan Besar UPM) before its name was changed. On 25 April 1996, the hall was inaugurated by Sultan Salahuddin Abdul Aziz Shah, the eighth Sultan of Selangor. Since then, UPM renamed the Great Hall to its current name. PKKSSAAS is the venue for orientation, convocation, and even examinations.

The Experimental Theatre (Panggung Percubaan) is part of PKKSSAAS. It is a place for workshops on culture and arts, suitable for theatre performances and debate competition. It can also be used as a platform for the trial of performances.

=== Mosque ===
The UPM Mosque (Malay: Masjid UPM) is the university mosque that built to fulfill the prayer needs of Muslim community from UPM and Taman Sri Serdang. The construction started in 1987 and completed in 1989, with total area of 9 hectares. The exterior design of the mosque is inspired by Saladin's war helmet, symbolising the spirit of Jihad in Islam. The mosque consists of 2 floors, able to congregate 9,500 people at the same time. The University Islamic Centre, founded on 1 October 1988, is responsible for managing the mosque and Islamic affairs of UPM.

=== Expo Hill ===
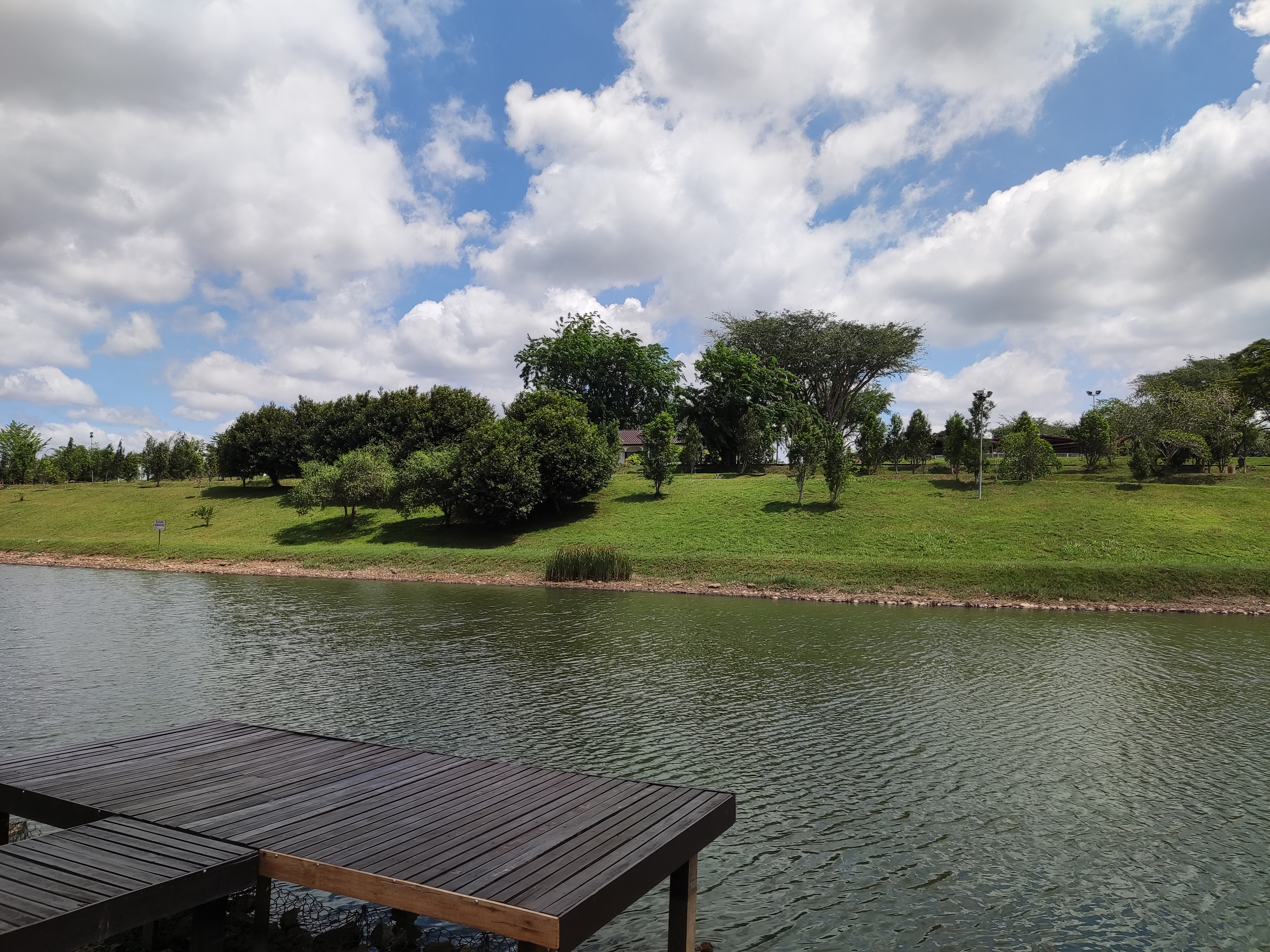
There is a dock on the second pond

The Expo Hill (Malay: Bukit Ekspo) is a recreational place in UPM, located at south of Thirteenth College and northwest of UniPutra Golf Club. With the area approximately 12 hectares, it has divided into five zones. Another 13 hectares is made up of 5 freshwater fish ponds which are rearing 5 different fish species (Lampam, Tilapia, Rohu, Belida and Sepat). The Expo Hill was used as the venue of the Agricultural Expo and Convocation Festival for the first time during the first convocation of UPM in 1977. There is an elevated railway track crossing the Expo Hill, travelled by KLIA Ekspres and KLIA Transit, to which the nearest station is Bandar Tasik Selatan station.

=== Transportation accessibility ===
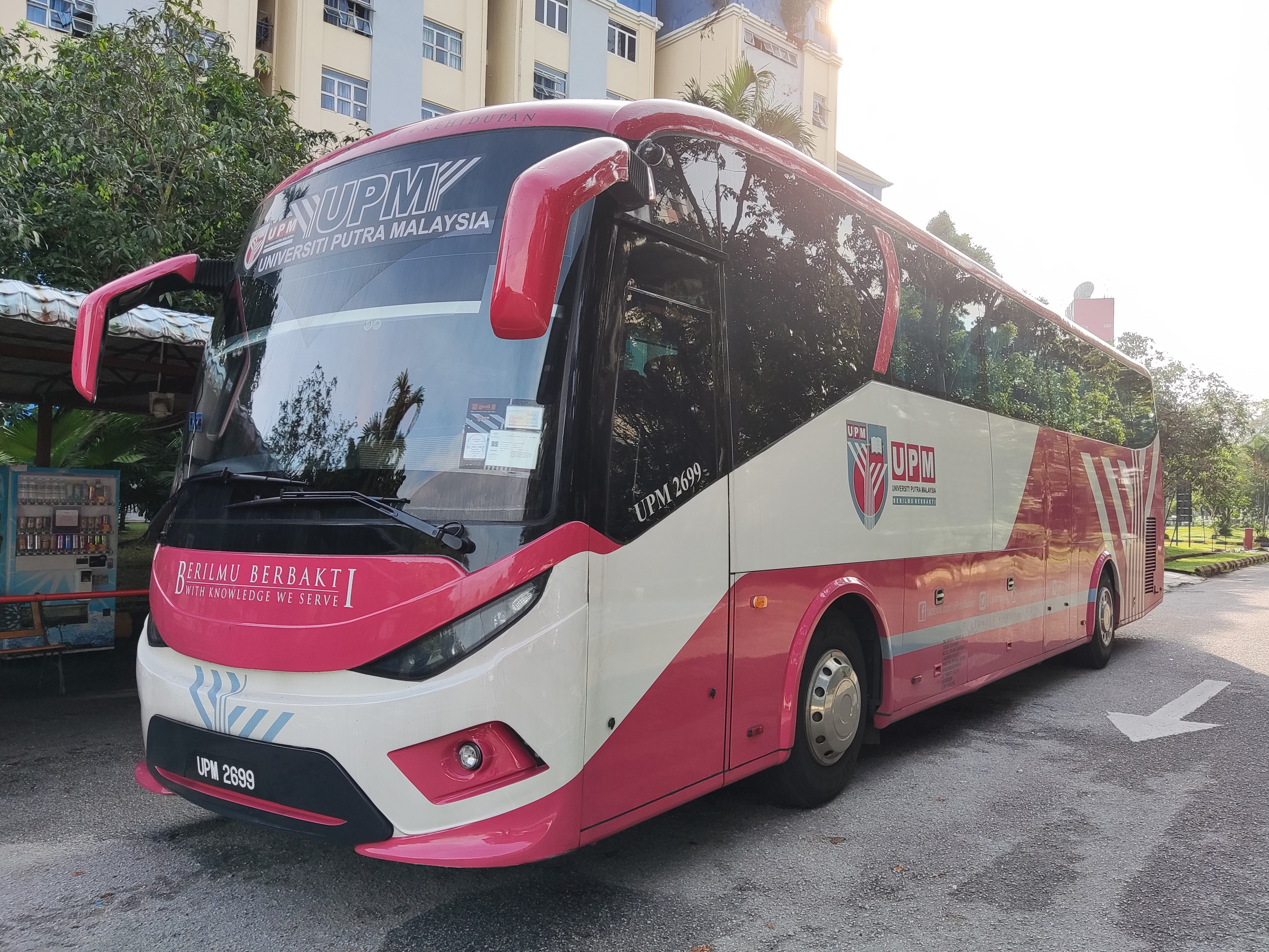
UPM bus at K10 bus station

In Serdang campus, UPM buses travel between faculties and residential colleges to bring students to their destination. Starting from August 2023, UPM diminished the bus service to minimise carbon footprint and reduce expense. However, the MRT feeder buses with route number T568 are alternative transportation for the public including the UPM students. Passengers pay RM 1.00 with Touch 'n Go card from any station to any station.

The MRT of Putrajaya line has been fully operational since 16 March 2023, the UPM MRT station is located at the northwest edge of UPM, adjacent to the Family, Adolescent and Child Research Centre of Excellence (FACE). Except the Trek Rides demand-responsive transport service powered by Selangor Mobility, the MRT station is also accessible by feeder buses which their frequency is between 20 minutes and 1 hour, depends on the estimated peak hours.

Although e-hailing is available in campus, students can get downtown by the SJ04 Smart Selangor bus. The stations are including South City Plaza, The Mines, Serdang Jaya MRT station and the Serdang KTM station as the terminus.

== Controversy ==
=== Killing of stray dogs ===
On 3 October 2025, an environmental group called Pertubuhan Pelindung Khazanah Alam (PEKA) alleged that between December 2024 and January 2025, the university had unlawfully killed at least 18 stray dogs and 5 puppies in its university compound by way of shooting and poisoning. The group accused that, based on whistleblower's information, UPM had hired a third-party pest control company named PCH Care Services to kill stray dogs by firearms in two operations, with a cost of RM6,000 or RM7,000 per operation, or RM400 for each dog. PEKA also stated that they have received reports of university staff poisoning puppies and presumably buried their carcasses within the university compound.

The group alleged that the number of dogs killed could be as high as 20 to 30 dogs based on an invoice between UPM and the company, but so far the group could only independently verify the death of 18 dogs and 5 puppies based on photographic evidence. The group subsequently claimed that UPM and the company may have violated the Animal Welfare Act 2015, which prohibits killings of dogs and cats by firearms, and the act of inflicting undue pain and suffering on animals. They also questioned how the company could obtain firearms under Malaysia's strict firearms law, and whether proper procedures were complied with, such as notifying the police before their operation. PEKA also argued that UPM should have taken a more humane approach such as the trap-neuter-release method to address stray dogs issue through the university's own Faculty of Veterinary Medicine.

In response to the allegations, UPM through a statement issued on 4 October expressed its regret over the incident and pledged to launch an internal investigation over the matter. The university stated that "As an institution that upholds the aspiration of planetary health, including animal welfare and well-being, the university will not compromise on what has occurred." However, PEKA criticised the university's response as "misleading, illogical and an attempt to downplay criminal offences", arguing that UPM has failed to admit responsibility and is trying to downplay the incident into a management issue instead of a criminal matter where police intervention is required.

On 7 October, the group filed a police report against UPM, Veterinary Service Department and the company, urging the police to investigate them under the Animal Welfare Act 2015, Arms Act 1960 and Firearms (Increased Penalties) Act 1971. It also threatened to stage a protest at the university's entrance if no proper actions were taken by UPM by 10 October. Its lawyer also revealed that based on their query with the company, the actual cost per dog killed is RM220, however UPM was charged with RM400 per dog, therefore the remaining spending of RM180 per dog were missing. A day later, the police confirmed a criminal investigation has been launched under Section 30(1) of the Animal Welfare Act 2015.

On 14 October, UPM issued an official apology over the matter and relieved the duties of its Occupational Safety and Health Management Office director, who previously ordered the culling of stray dogs. It also suspended all stray dogs management activities pending the development of a new set of standard operating procedures.

== Rankings ==
University rankings

Global – Overall
- ARWU World: 601-700
- CWTS World: 321
- QS World: =134
- RUR World: 204
- THE World: 601-800
- USNWR Global: =578

Regional – Overall
- QS Asia: 22
- THE Asia: 132

National – Overall
- QS National: 3
- THE National: 8

The graphs below show the QS Rankings and THE Rankings respectively. The rankings by region (Asia) are not same as the Asian universities' ranking filtered from world rankings because QS changed the indicators and weightings; THE also recalibrated their results to reflect priorities and attributes of Asian universities. In the 2021 rankings, QS Top 50 Under 50 and THE Young University Ranking ranked UPM for the last time because 50 years had passed since it was established as a university in 1971.

View source data.
View source data.

=== THE Impact rankings ===
Times Higher Education Impact Rankings are the global performance tables that assess universities against the United Nations' Sustainable Development Goals (SDGs).

Year	Rank
2019	201-300
2020	101-200
2021	201-300
2022	201-300
2023	201-300
2024	401-600
2025	401-600

=== UI GreenMetric ===
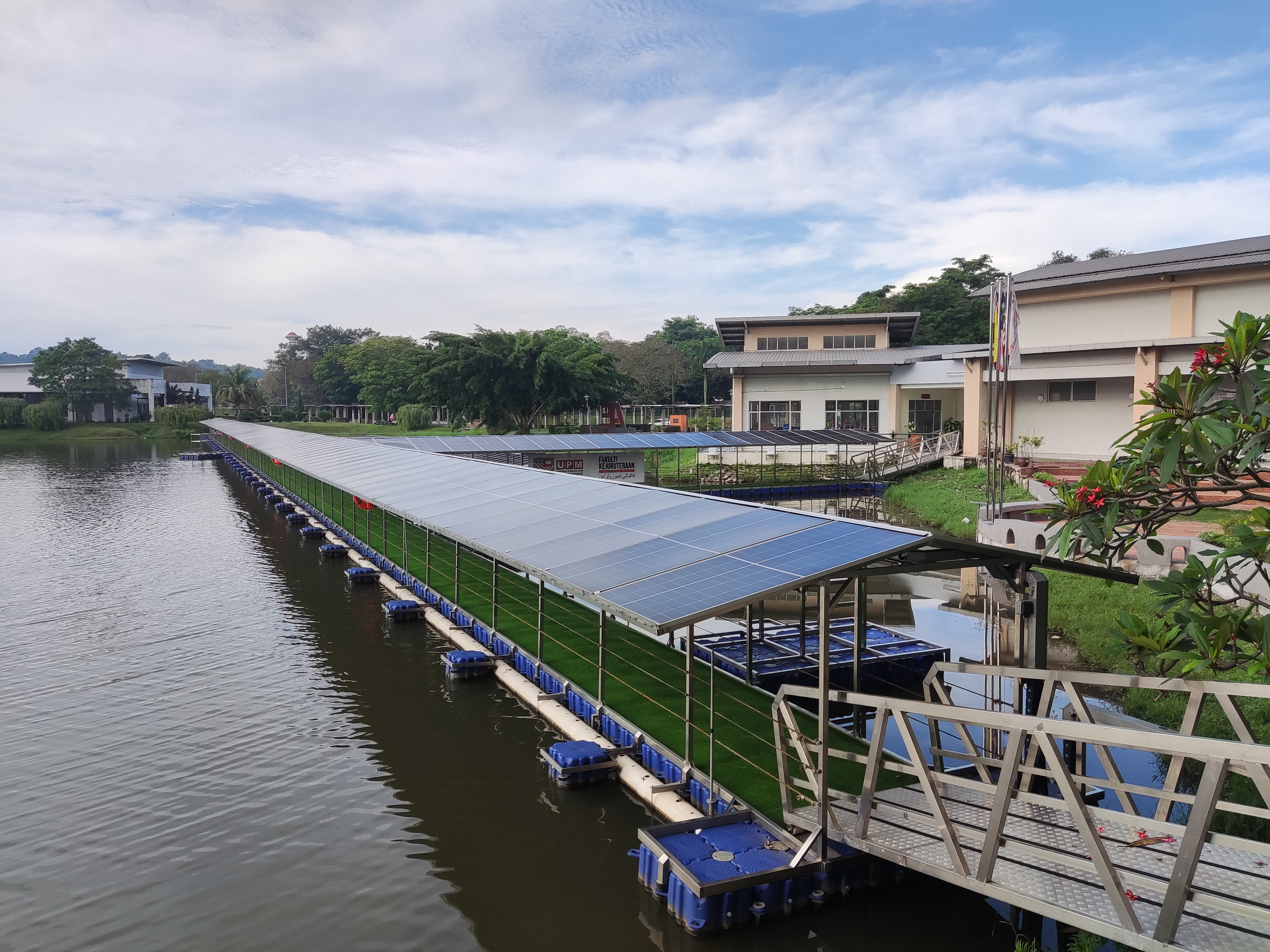
As the energy transition initiative namely SURIA 16 was implemented, solar panels has been installed on the roof of university buildings since 2022

In 2024, Universiti Putra Malaysia is ranked 24th in the world. The ranking of UI GreenMetric is based on six criteria:

- Setting & infrastructure (15%)
- Energy & climate change (21%)
- Waste (18%)
- Water (10%)
- Transportation (18%)
- Education & research (18%)

Year	Overall rankings	Total score
2010	6	7698.60
2011	17	7204.60
2012	19	6570.03
2013	16	6672.85
2014	42	6628
2015	17	6491
2016	34	6543
2017	27	6420
2018	32	7575
2019	28	8000
2020	28	8125
2021	27	8425
2022	25	8800
2023	25	8900
2024	24	9050
2025	31	8975

== Notable academics ==
See also Category:Academic staff of the University of Putra Malaysia

- Dato' Abu Bakar Salleh, Enzyme and microbial technology scientist, Former Deputy Vice-Chancellor Research and Innovation
- Chin Hoong Fong, Seed scientist, Professor Emeritus
- Mohd Sapuan Salit, Material scientist and engineer
- Tan Sri Omar Abdul Rahman (academic), Veterinary scientist, Former Deputy Vice-Chancellor Academic Affairs
- Willie Soon, Astrophysicist and aerospace engineer
- First Admiral (Retired) Sutarji Kasmin, Former navy special forces commander.
- Datin Paduka Khatijah Yusoff, Virologist
- Ahmad Zaharin Aris, Professor of hydrochemistry

== Notable alumni ==
=== Politicians ===
- Dato' Seri Dr. Ahmad Zahid Hamidi, Deputy Prime Minister of Malaysia
- Datuk Seri Saifuddin Nasution Ismail, Minister of Home Affairs
- Chang Lih Kang, Minister of Science, Technology and Innovation
- Dato' Seri Amirudin Shari, Menteri Besar of Selangor
- Tan Kar Hing, Member of Parliament (MP) for Gopeng
- Penguang Manggil, State Deputy Minister of Public Health and Housing of Sarawak
- Najwan Halimi, Member of the Selangor State Executive Council (EXCO)
- Wong Siew Ki, Member of the Selangor State Legislative Assembly (MLA) for Seri Kembangan
- Datuk Seri Ronald Kiandee, former Minister of Agriculture and Food Industries
- Datuk Seri Haji Salahuddin Ayub, former Minister of Domestic Trade and Living Costs
- Tan Sri Ong Kee Hui, former Minister of Science, Technology and Environment
- Dato' Sri Hajah Rohani Abdul Karim, former Minister of Women, Family and Community Development
- Datuk Seri Dr Mujahid Yusof Rawa, former Minister in the Prime Minister's Department (Religious Affairs)
- Datuk Seri Wilfred Madius Tangau, former Deputy Chief Minister of Sabah
- Chong Eng, former MP for Bukit Mertajam
- Irwan Prayitno, 9th Governor of West Sumatra, Indonesia

=== Athletes ===
- Cheng Chu Sian, archer
- Mon Redee Sut Txi, archer
- Syaqiera Mashayikh, archer
- Wan Khalmizam, archer
- Rachel Yeoh Li Wen, artistic gymnast
- Sharul Aimy, artistic gymnast
- Cheah Liek Hou, badminton player
- Ann Osman, mixed martial artist
- Roslinda Samsu, pole vaulter
- Bibiana Ng, shooter
- Johnathan Wong, shooter
- Azreen Nabila Alias, sprinter
- Nazmizan Muhammad, sprinter
- Zaidatul Husniah Zulkifli, sprinter
- Welson Sim, swimmer
- Elaine Teo, Taekwondo practitioner
- Hakimi Ismail, triple jumper
- Leong Mun Yee, retired diver
- Cheong Jun Hoong, retired diver
- Yu Peng Kean, retired fencer
- Diana Bong, retired wushu athlete

=== Academics ===
- Ali Dehghantanha, Professor, University of Guelph
- Faiza Darkhani, environmentalist, women's rights activist, and educator
- Husaini Omar, Professor, researcher and geological engineer
- Mahaletchumy Arujanan, biotechnologist, Global Coordinator of ISAAA
- Moi Meng Ling, Professor, the University of Tokyo, virologist
- Refaat Alareer, professor of literature and creative writing at the Islamic University of Gaza, Palestine

=== Businesspeople ===
- Ebit Lew, founder of Elewsmart
- Wen Shin Chia, founder of cooking oil recycling company Green Yards

=== Civil servants ===
- Tan Sri Mazlan Lazim, retired Deputy Inspector-General of Police of Malaysia

=== Poets ===
- Raja Rajeswari Setha Raman, poet

== See also ==
- Universiti Putra Malaysia Bintulu Campus
- List of universities in Malaysia
- UPM Press
- Malay Heritage Museum
- Sultan Abdul Aziz Shah Hospital
