= Ahmad Zaharin Aris =

Malaysian academic

Ahmad Zaharin Aris FASc

Director of the International Institute of Aquaculture and Aquatic Sciences (I-AQUAS) Universiti Putra Malaysia
- In office 1 April 2021 – present
- Chancellor: Sharafuddin of Selangor

Dean of the Faculty of Environmental Studies Universiti Putra Malaysia
- In office 1 September 2016 – 29 February 2020
- Chancellor: Sharafuddin of Selangor

Deputy Dean (Postgraduate, Research and Development) of the Faculty of Environmental Studies Universiti Putra Malaysia
- In office 1 September 2014 – 31 August 2016
- Chancellor: Sharafuddin of Selangor

Personal details
- Born: 5 June 1983 (age 43) Penang
- Citizenship: Malaysia
- Education: University Malaysia Sabah (BSc); Universiti Malaysia Sabah (PhD)

Ahmad Zaharin Aris FASc is an academician and professor of hydrochemistry. He was appointed as a professor at the age of 33 and as a senior professor at the age of 36. He was the Dean of the Faculty of Environmental Studies, Universiti Putra Malaysia from 2016 until 2020. On 1 March 2020, the faculty merged with the Faculty of Forestry to form Faculty of Forestry and Environment. He is then appointed by UPM as the 3rd director of International Institute of Aquaculture and Aquatic Sciences (I-AQUAS), a research institute that upgraded from the Marine Science Centre on 15 December 2017.

== Award ==
- Malaysia Winner for APEC Science Prize for Innovation, Research, and Education (“ASPIRE”), Asia-Pacific Economic Cooperation, 2022
- World Top 2% Scientists 2022 by Stanford University, 2022
- World Top 2% Scientists 2021 by Stanford University, 2021
- Elected Fellow, Academy of Sciences Malaysia, 2021-lifetime.
- World Top 2% Scientists 2020 by Stanford University, 2020
- Malaysia Winner for APEC Science Prize for Innovation, Research, and Education (“ASPIRE”), Asia-Pacific Economic Cooperation, 2019.
- Top Research Scientists Malaysia (TRSM) – Environmental Chemistry and Analysis, Academy of Sciences Malaysia, 2018.
- Best Professor in Environmental Studies, The Golden Globe Tigers Award 2017, 2017.
- Finalist for Zayed International Prize (Young Scientists Award for Environmental Sustainability)
- First Runner Up, National Young Scientist Award 2016 (Anugerah Saintis Muda Negara 2016), Ministry of Science, Technology and Innovation Malaysia, 2016
- SEARCA Regional Professorial Chair, Southeast Asian Regional Centre for Graduate Study and Research in Agriculture (SEARCA), 2016–2017.
- Young Scientist Award 2013 (Vice Chancellor Fellowship Award), Universiti Putra Malaysia, 2014.
