= Police dog (disambiguation) =

Police dog is a dog that is primarily trained to assist police or other law enforcement personnel.

Police dog may also refer to:

== Police units ==
- Police Dog Unit, specialist unit of the Hong Kong Police
- Police K-9 Unit (Singapore), formerly "Police Dog Unit" of the Singapore Police
- Metropolitan Police Dog Support Unit of the London Metropolital Police
- Police Dog Training Centre of the Kerala Police Academy
- Airport Police Dog Unit of the Irish Airport Police Service
- Royal Malaysia Police K9 Unit, a unit under the criminal investigation department of the Malaysia Police

== Entertainment ==
- Police Dog Story, a 1961 U.S. crime film
- Police Dog (film) (1955 film) UK crime film
- The Police Dog (TV series); an animated cartoon series
- Police Doggy (an EP release)
- Police Dog Hogan, a British band
- Dog×Police (2011 film) Japanese film

== See also ==
- List of police dog breeds
- Working dog
- Detection dog
- Guard dog
- K9 (disambiguation)
