= Honorary Commissioner-in-Chief of Police =

Highest Commissioner in Malaysia

Honorary Commissioner-in-Chief of the Royal Malaysia Police
- Pesuruhjaya Yang Dipertua Kehormat ڤسوروهجاي يڠ دڤرتوا کحرمت
- Logo of the Royal Malaysia Police

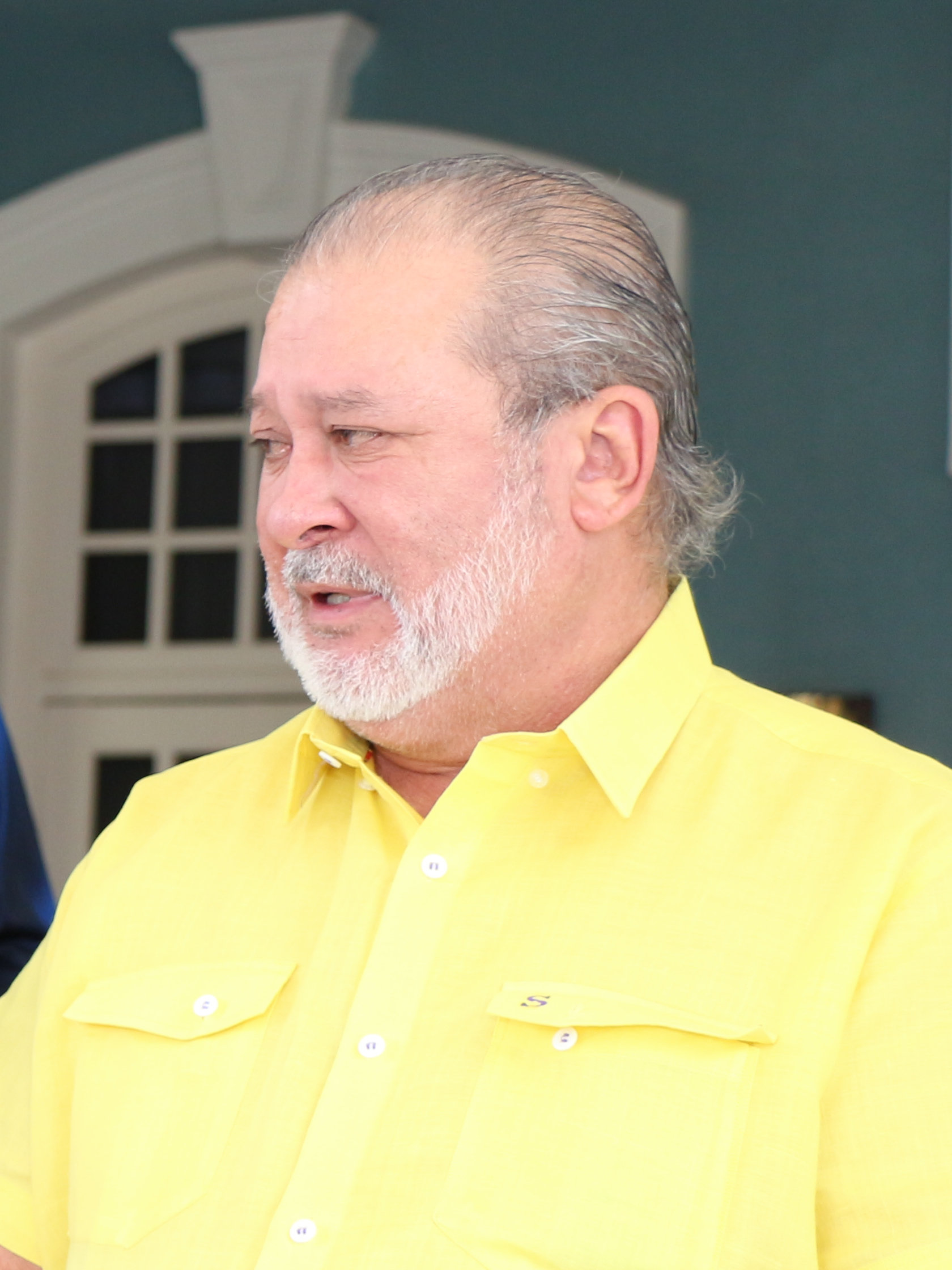
- Incumbent; Sultan Ibrahim Iskandar since 10 May 2024
- Royal Malaysia Police
- Style: His Majesty
- Type: Honorary or ceremonial
- Residence: Istana Negara
- Constituting instrument: Section 6A of Police Act 1967
- Formation: 10 May 2024; 2 years ago
- First holder: Sultan Ibrahim Iskandar

The honorary commissioner-in-chief (Malay: Pesuruhjaya Yang Dipertua Kehormat, Jawi: ڤسوروهجاي يڠ دڤرتوا کحرمت) of the Royal Malaysia Police, is the highest-ranking and ceremonial office in the command structure of the Malaysian police. This office is held by the Yang di-Pertuan Agong (king of Malaysia) as provided by Section 6A of the Police Act 1967.

It was created with the intention to reflect the king’s role in the ceremonial affairs of the police force and recognizes his position as the supreme head of the nation under Article 32 of the Federal Constitution. The proposal to create such a position for the king was approved in the 265th meeting of the Conference of Rulers held on 21 and 22 February 2024, and the related legislative amendment bill was passed by the Dewan Rakyat on 21 March 2024 and Dewan Negara on 1 April 2024. The office was officially created on 10 May 2024 when the Police (Amendment) Act 2024, which inserted the new Section 6A into the Police Act 1967, came into operation on that day. (Note: An Act of Parliament, unless otherwise stated by the Act itself, will automatically come into operation on the second day of its gazettement as per Section 19(1) of the Interpretation Acts 1948 and 1967.)

== Function and responsibility ==
Although the Police (Amendment) Act 2024 did not further elaborate or demarcate the powers and duties of this newly created position, therefore it is presumed to be a largely ceremonial position. During the debate on Police (Amendment) Bill 2024 in Dewan Rakyat, Deputy Home Minister Shamsul Anuar Nasarah said that the amendment does not grant the King any operational control over the police force, as the power of command and control of the police force remains with the inspector-general of police (IGP), as stipulated in Section 4 of the Police Act 1967.

== See also ==
- Royal Malaysia Police
- Yang di-Pertuan Agong
- Commander-in-Chief of the Malaysian Armed Forces
- Police Act 1967
