= Royal Malaysia Police =

National police force of Malaysia

Royal Malaysia Police Polis Diraja Malaysia ڤوليس دراج مليسيا
- Badge of the Royal Malaysia Police
- Abbreviation: RMP, PDRM
- Motto: Polis dan Masyarakat, Berpisah Tiada ("Police and The Community, Inseparable")

Agency overview
- Formed: Ceremonial: 25 March 1807; 219 years ago; Functional: 1963; 63 years ago
- Preceding agencies: Royal Federation of Malaya Police; Federation of Malaya Police; Malayan Union Police Force; Civil Affairs Police Force; North Borneo Police Force
- Employees: 137,574
- Volunteers: Sukarelawan Simpanan Polis Diraja Malaysia; Sukarelawan Siswa Polis Diraja Malaysia
- Legal personality: Police force

Jurisdictional structure
- National agency (Operations jurisdiction): Malaysia
- Operations jurisdiction: Malaysia
- Area: 330,803 km^{2} (127,724 sq mi) (Population: 32767900)
- Legal jurisdiction: National
- Governing body: Government of Malaysia
- Constituting instrument: Police Act 1967
- General nature: Civilian police

Operational structure
- Overseen by: Independent Police Conduct Commission
- Headquarters: Bukit Aman, Kuala Lumpur, Malaysia
- Sworn members: 137,574
- Elected officers responsible: Ibrahim Iskandar, Honorary Commissioner-in-Chief of Police; Saifuddin Nasution Ismail, Minister of Home Affairs
- Agency executives: Mohd Khalid Ismail, Inspector-General of Police; Abdul Aziz Abdul Majid, Deputy Inspector-General of Police
- Parent agency: Ministry of Home Affairs
- Child agencies: Management Department; Logistics & Technology Department; Criminal Investigation Department; Commercial Crimes Investigation Department; Narcotics Crimes Investigation Department; Special Branch; Traffic Enforcement and Investigation Department; Integrity and Standards Compliance Department; Crime Prevention and Community Safety Department; Internal Security and Public Order Department

Facilities
- Police stations: 1,000+
- Police cars: Proton Preve, Proton Inspira, Proton Waja, Mitsubishi Lancer Evolution X, Mitsubishi Lancer 2.0 GTS, Mitsubishi Outlander, Toyota Hilux, Honda Civic, Proton X70, etc
- Police boats: Gading Marine FIC / FAC, Marine Alutech Watercat M14, etc
- Planes: 208 Caravan, PC-6 Porter, Super King Air
- Helicopters: AS355, AW139

Website
- www.rmp.gov.my

The Royal Malaysia Police (often abbreviated RMP; Malay: Polis Diraja Malaysia, PDRM; Jawi: ڤوليس دراج مليسيا) is a primarily uniformed national and federal police force of Malaysia. The force is a centralised organisation, and its headquarters are located at Bukit Aman, Kuala Lumpur. The police force is led by an Inspector-General of Police (IGP) who, as of 23 June 2025, is Mohd Khalid Ismail. Since 10 May 2024, the Yang di-Pertuan Agong is also the Honorary Commissioner-in-Chief of the police force.

The constitution, control, employment, recruitment, funding, discipline, duties and powers of the police force are specified and governed by the Police Act 1967.

The RMP constantly co-operates with police forces worldwide, including from those six neighbouring countries Malaysia shares a border with: Indonesian National Police, Philippine National Police, Royal Brunei Police Force, Royal Thai Police, Singapore Police Force and People's Public Security of Vietnam.

There are currently more than 130,000 sworn officers under the Royal Malaysian Police. The RMP often works closely with other law enforcement agencies in the country such as the customs department, immigration department, maritime enforcement agency and many more.

== History ==
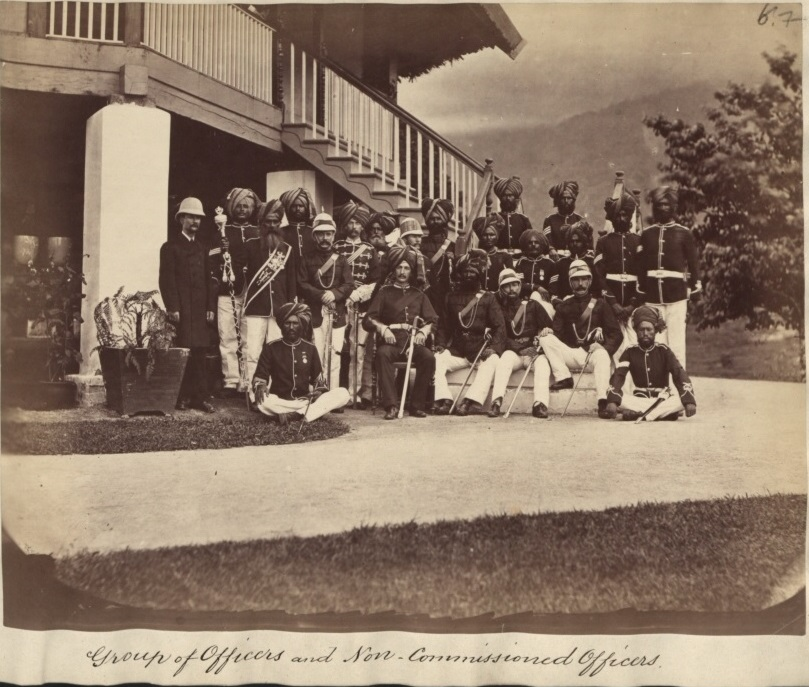
Group of Officers and Non-Commissioned Officers in Perak, c. 1880–1890.

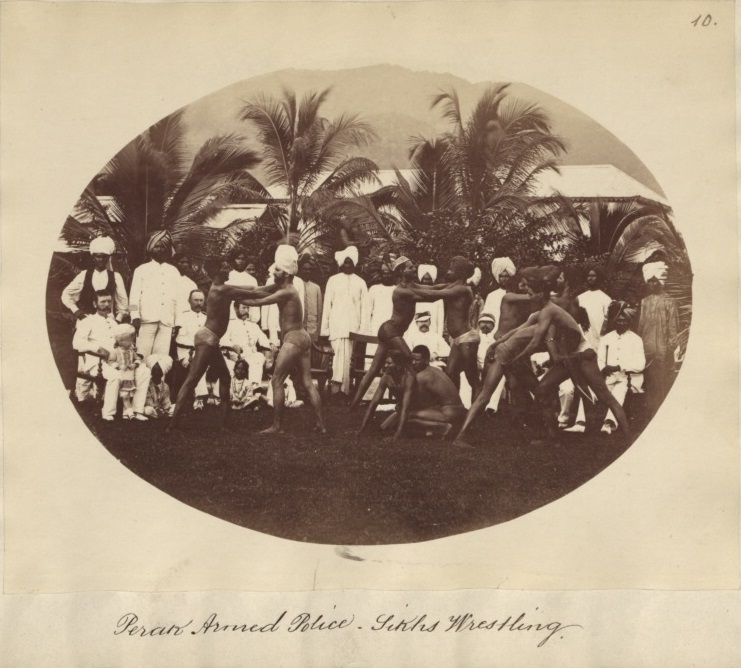
Trained Sikhs in the Perak Armed Police demonstrating Pehlwani wrestling, c. 1880–1890.

A police force has been in existence in what is today called Malaysia since the days of the Malacca Sultanate. Malacca's canonical law created what was essentially a police force in Malaysia in the fifteenth century, through the institution of the Temenggung and Hulubalang, or royal warriors. During the Sultan of Malacca's absence, the Bendahara, or Prime Minister, held absolute authority, with the power to hand out sentences, but it was the Temenggung who acted as the Police Chief or Inspector General of Police. His tasks were to arrest criminals, build jails and implement sentences. Apart from the Temenggung, there were a number of Penghulu or village chiefs who had the duty of policing their respective villages. Their main tasks included tax collection, law enforcement and preserving village security. These Malacca police systems ended when, on 10 August 1511, a Portuguese fleet led by Afonso de Albuquerque conquered Malacca for the Portuguese crown. Police duties were then largely performed by the Portuguese soldiers.

During the sixteenth century, Malaysia became a cosmopolitan society and the Portuguese government introduced the Kapitan administration. On 14 January 1641, however, the Portuguese lost Malacca to the Dutch Empire, when the Dutch invaded with the help of soldiers from Johor state, at a time when the Portuguese were at war with the Sultanate of Acheh. The Dutch retained the Kapitan system, but when the growing number of Europeans in Malaysia made change necessary, a police force known as the 'Burgher Guard' was established. The Burgher Guard was controlled by the Dutch, but their subordinates were made up of the local citizens. Village leaders continued to assume the duties of policemen under Dutch rule, as they had since before the Portuguese arrived.

Following the assimilation of Malacca into the British Empire in 1795, a modern police organisation in Malaysia was formed, on 25 March 1807, after the Charter of Justice in Penang was granted, with Penang being the first to form a police force. 25 March is today marked as Police Day in Malaysia. Most of the officers were of British origin. Later, this organisation was developed in the Straits Settlements and other Malay states, particularly the Federated Malay States. At that time, independent police forces were established for each respective state. Only after World War II was a central police organisation formed, known as the Civil Affairs Police Force. This organisation was formed in Malaya and led by a British colonial, H.B. Longworthy, who had to stabilise the police forces after the anarchy of Japanese occupation. One of the immediate problems faced by the police at this time was the rebellion of the communist party. During the confrontation between Malaysia and Indonesia, which lasted from 1963 to 1965, the police force, along with military forces, fought against the infiltration of Indonesian forces into the states of Johor and Sabah.

Almost a year after Independence Day, on 24 July 1958, His Majesty the King of Malaya Tuanku Abdul Rahman Ibni Almarhum Tuanku Muhamad bestowed the title Royal to the Federation of Malaya Police in honor of not only its service during the Malayan Emergency but also for its 151 years of continuous service to the nation. In 1963, the Royal Federation of Malayan Police (RFMP), the North Borneo Police Force and the Sarawak Constabulary were merged to form the Royal Malaysia Police. The Singapore Police Force became a component unit of the RMP until Singapore's independence in 1965.

== Insignia ==
The flag and insignia of the Royal Malaysia Police has a blue-coloured background which symbolises the Malaysian masses. In the centre of the flag is the PDRM symbol coloured silver or white. The police symbol is made up of an intersected Kris and Ilang / Klewang machete. Above the PDRM symbol, there is a tiger head in a garland of Paddy flowers, with a scroll underneath bearing the name Polis Diraja Malaysia. Arabic lettering in the Crown includes the words Allah on the right and Muhammad on the left.

=== Moon and star ===
The Moon and Star symbolises Islam as the official religion of Malaysia.

=== Crown ===
The crown, depicted on the Royal Malaysia Police insignia, is a panegyric reference to the King of Malaysia, bestowing the "Royal" title to its name. The words Allah and Muhammad in Arabic, which respectively symbolize Allah the Almighty and Muhammad as the Messenger, signifies Islam as the official religion and faith of RMP personnel are willing to uphold justice and the security of the people of Malaysia.

=== Kris and the Ilang sword ===
The Kris is an important symbol of the Malay Peninsula. This particular weapon was used by Malay warriors in the past. According to Frey (2003), who concluded from Sir Stamford Raffles' (1817) study of the Candi Sukuh, the kris came into existence around AD 1361. Others believe that early forms were inspired by the daggers of the Dong-Son in Vietnam (circa 300 BC). In the temples of Borobudur (825 CE) and Prambanan (850CE), renderings of the Kris have been found.

The traditional machete, Ilang or Klewang symbolises the states of Sarawak and Sabah in East Malaysia and it represents the spirit of heroism of a multitude of ethnic tribes such as the Dayak, Dusun, Bajau and Kadazan.

=== Tiger head ===
The tiger head symbolises courage, strength and spirits of RMP.

=== Paddy flower ===
Paddy flower is a reference to paddy and rice, the staple food for Malaysians and it signifies national prosperity.

=== Motto ===
The RMP motto represents team spirit and determination.

=== Sang Saka Biru ===
The PDRM flag is called the Blue Perennial or Sang Saka Biru; each colour has its own distinctive meaning and the flag symbolises the force's pride and integrity.

== Police pledge ==
Section 20 (3) Police Act 1967 stipulates that the duties of the Royal Malaysia Police personnel are as follows:

1. Apprehending all persons whom he is by law authorised to apprehend;
2. Processing security intelligence;
3. Conducting prosecutions;
4. Giving assistance in the carrying out of any law relating to revenue, excise, sanitation, quarantine, immigration and registration;
5. Giving assistance in the preservation of order in the ports, harbours and airports of Malaysia, and in enforcing maritime and port regulations;
6. Executing summonses, subpoenas, warrants, commitments and other process lawfully issued by any competent authority;
7. Exhibiting information;
8. Protecting unclaimed and lost property and finding the owners thereof;
9. Seizing stray animals and placing them in a public pound;
10. Giving assistance in the protection of life and property;
11. Protecting public property from loss or injury;
12. Attending the criminal courts and, if specially ordered, the civil courts, and keeping order therein; and
13. Escorting and guarding prisoners and other persons in the custody of the police.

== Police ranks ==
Gazetted officers

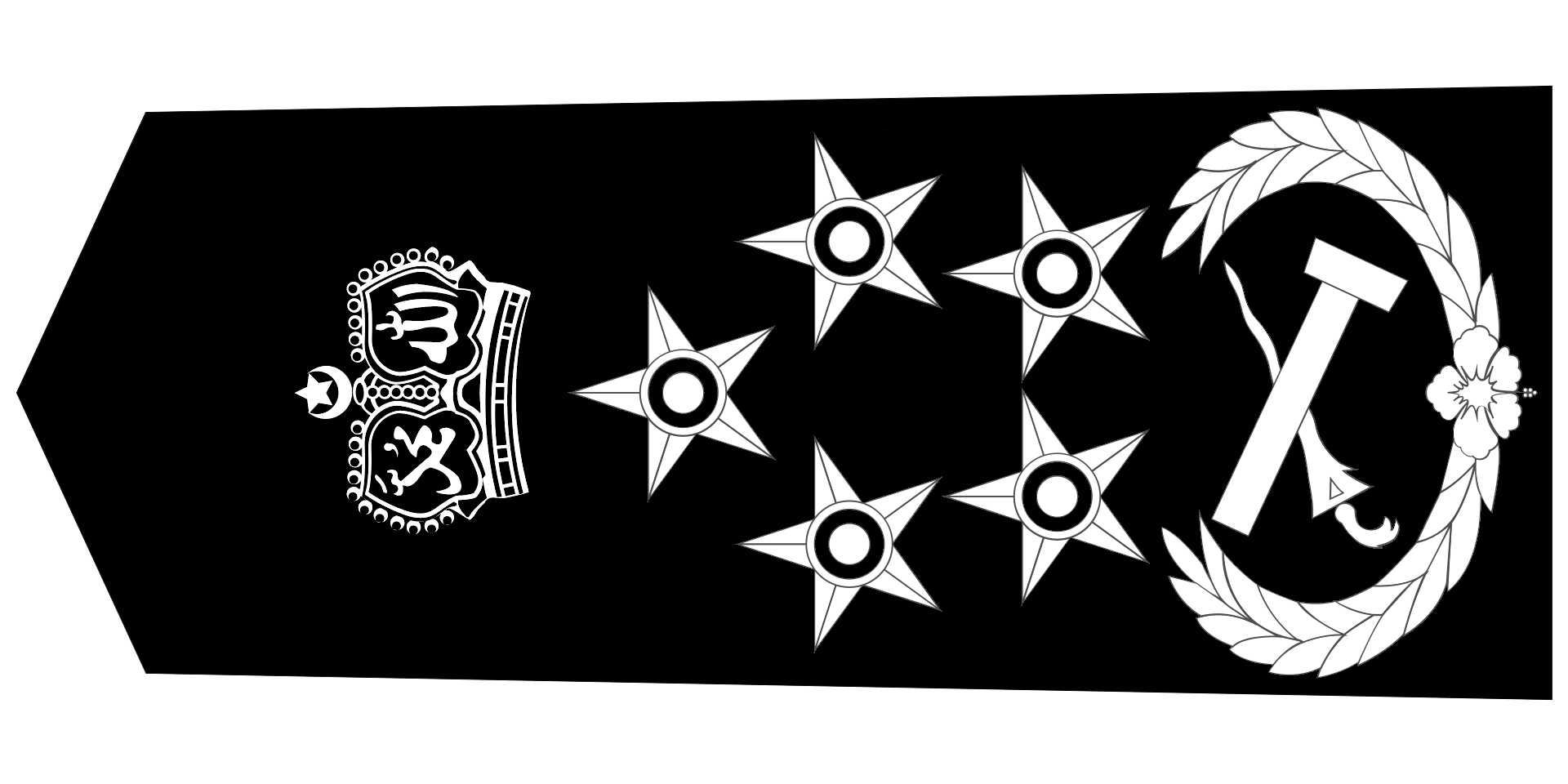
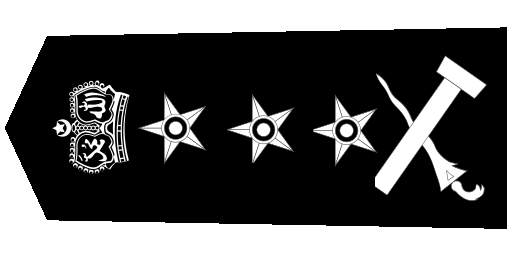
Rank group	General / flag officers					Senior officers			Junior officers
	Commissioners							Superintendents			Inspectors
Royal Malaysia Police													No equivalent
Royal Malaysia Police				Department Director State Police Chief									No equivalent
Royal Malaysia Police	Honorary Commissioner-in-Chief of Police (HCC)	Inspector-General of Police (IGP)	Deputy Inspector General of police (DIG)	Commissioner of Police (CP)	Deputy Commissioner of Police (DCP)	Senior Assistant Commissioner of Police (SAC)	Assistant Commissioner of Police (ACP)	Superintendent of Police (SUPT)	Deputy Superintendent of Police (DSP)	Assistant Superintendent of Police (ASP)	Inspector (Insp)	Probationary Inspector (P/Insp)	No equivalent

Rank and Files officers

Rank group	Senior NCOs				Junior NCOs		Enlisted
	Non-commissioned officers					Constables
Royal Malaysia Police
Royal Malaysia Police			No equivalent				No equivalent
Royal Malaysia Police	Sub-Inspector (SI)	Sergeant Major (SM)	No equivalent	Sergeant (Sgt)	Corporal (Cpl)	Lance Corporal (L/Cpl)	No equivalent	Police Constable (Const)

Lower ranks of police officers apart from Sub-Inspectors wear their rank insignia on the right sleeve of their uniforms. Sub-Inspectors and higher ranks wear their rank insignia on epaulettes on both shoulders.

Prior to 16 February 1996, the police rank were translated from English such as Deputy Commissioner of Police translated as Timbalan Pesuruhjaya Polis. After 16 February 1996, the police rank were translated from Bahasa Malaysia such as Deputy Commissioner of Police translated as Deputi Komisioner Polis, however the abbreviation of police rank would still be in English. The rank of Chief Inspector (C/Insp) was abolished in 2013.

== RMP organisational structure ==
RMP is distributed into over 1000 police stations, with several stations making up a police district. The Officer in-Charge of Police Station (OCS) reports to the Officer in-Charge of Police District (OCPD).

Apart from the three departments involved in the administration: the Management Department and the Logistics & Technology Department and Integrity and Standards Compliance Department, RMP has seven departments involved in crime prevention: Criminal Investigation Department, Narcotics Criminal Investigation Department, Internal Security and Public Order Department, Special Branch, Crime Prevention and Community Safety Department, Commercial Crime Investigation Department and Traffic Enforcement and Investigation Department. All departments are led by the directors with the rank of Commissioner of Police (Army Equivalent rank of Three Stars General or Lieutenant-General).

=== Police heads ===
Type	Appointment	Rank	Abbr	Officer	Effective	Tenure	Ref.
Honorary Commissioner-in-Chief of Police	Honorary Commissioner-in-Chief of Police of Malaysia	Honorary Commissioner-in-Chief of Police	HCC	His Majesty the King of Malaysia; Sultan Ibrahim; DK I (Johor) DK (Kedah) DK (Kelantan) DK I (Pahang) DK II (Pahang) DK (Perak) DK (Perlis) DK I (Selangor) DK I (Terengganu) DMN SMN SPMJ SSIJ SPMT SPMK SPMP DP SPDK	10 May 2024	2 years and 189 days	
Inspector-General of Police	Inspector-General of Police of Malaysia	Inspector-General of Police	IGP	Tan Sri Dato' Seri Haji; Mohd Khalid Ismail; PMN SPMP SSAP SPDK SPTS DIMP DPTS PGPP PSPP PPS PPA PJPN PJG	23 June 2025	1 year and 145 days	
Deputy Inspector-General of Police	Deputy Inspector-General of Police of Malaysia	Deputy Inspector-General of Police	DIG	Tan Sri; Ayob Khan Mydin Pitchay; PSM SSAP SPTS DGSM DMIJ DIMP PGPP JSM SDK PSPP BCK PPA PKN	23 June 2023	3 years and 145 days	
Commissioner of Police	(Sabah); Sabah; Police Commissioner	Commissioner of Police	CP	Datuk; Victor Sanjos; PGDK PPS PPA	10 November 2026	5 days	
Commissioner of Police	(Sarawak); Sarawak; Police Commissioner	Commissioner of Police	CP	Datuk; Mohamad Zainal Abdullah; DPSM SMP PSPP PPP PPA	26 September 2025	1 year and 50 days	
Chief of Police	(Johor); Johor; Police Chief	Commissioner of Police	CP	Datuk; Ab Rahaman Arsad; DMSM DMIJ PGPP PSPP PPP ANS PPA PJPN	4 August 2025	1 year and 103 days	
Chief of Police	(Kedah); Kedah; Police Chief	Commissioner of Police	CP	Datuk; Adzli Abu Shah; DMSM DDSP PSPP KMN PPS PPA PKN PJPN	27 July 2025	1 year and 111 days	
Chief of Police	(Kelantan); Kelantan; Police Chief	Commissioner of Police	CP	Dato' Haji; Mohd Yusoff Mamat; DPMK DIMP PGPP PSPP PPP PPA PKN	29 October 2024	2 years and 17 days	
Chief of Police	(Malacca); Malacca; Police Chief	Deputy Commissioner of Police	DCP	Datuk Wira; Dzulkhairi Mukhtar; DCSM DIMP PSPP AMW BJK PJK PPS PPA	28 February 2025	1 year and 260 days	
Chief of Police	(Negeri Sembilan); Negeri Sembilan; Police Chief	Deputy Commissioner of Police	DCP	Dato'; Alzafny Ahmad; DSAP DPSM SMS PSPP AMK PPT PPS PPA PKN	25 August 2025	1 year and 82 days	
Chief of Police	(Penang); Penang; Police Chief	Commissioner of Police	CP	Datuk; Dennis Lim Kwang Keng; DPSM SAP PSPP PPS PPA	20 June 2026	148 days	
Chief of Police	(Pahang); Pahang; Police Chief	Commissioner of Police	CP	Dato' Sri; Yahaya Othman; SSAP DIMP PGPP SAP PSPP AAP PPS PPA PNBB PJPN	10 May 2023	3 years and 189 days	
Chief of Police	(Perak); Perak; Police Chief	Commissioner of Police	CP	Dato'; Mohd Alwi Zainal Abidin; DIMP PSPP PPS PPA	5 June 2026	163 days	
Chief of Police	(Perlis); Perlis; Police Chief	Deputy Commissioner of Police	DCP	Dato'; Muhammad Abdul Halim; DSPJ JSD PSPP AMP PPS PPA	1 November 2023	3 years and 14 days	
Chief of Police	(Selangor); Selangor; Police Chief	Commissioner of Police	CP	Dato' Pahlawan; Shazeli Kahar; DPTS JSM PSPP AMN PPA PKN	30 July 2025	1 year and 108 days	
Chief of Police	(Terengganu); Terengganu; Police Chief	Deputy Commissioner of Police	DCP	Dato'; Mohd Khairi Khairudin; DIMP PSPP KMW AMP BKT PK PPA	5 May 2024	2 years and 194 days	
Chief of Police	(Kuala Lumpur); Kuala Lumpur; Police Chief	Commissioner of Police	CP	Dato'; Fadil Marsus; DIMP PGDK SMS PSPP KMN AMP PPS PPA PKN	11 August 2025	1 year and 96 days	

=== Staff departments ===
Department	Rank	Abbr	Director	Effective	Tenure	Ref.
Management Department (MD)	Commissioner of Police	CP	Dato' Sri; Abdul Aziz Abdul Majid; SSAP DIMP DSPN PGPP JSM PSPP PPP PPS PPA	16 December 2024	1 year and 334 days	
Special Branch (SB)	Commissioner of Police	CP	Dato' Sri; Ibrahim Darus; SSAP DMIJ DPSM PSPP PPP PPS PPA PKN	2025		
Criminal Investigation Department (CID)	Commissioner of Police	CP	Datuk; M Kumar S Muthuvelu; PJN DCSM DMIJ PGPP SAP SIJ PSPP BCM PPS PPA	8 August 2025	1 year and 99 days	
Internal Security and Public Order Department (ISPOD)	Commissioner of Police (JUSA A)	CP	Dato' Sri; Mohd Yusri Hassan Basri; SSAP DSAP DPTS PMW PGPP JMN SAP SMP PSPP AMN AAP JPP PKP PPS PPA	15 June 2026	153 days	
Commercial Crime Investigation Department (CCID)	Commissioner of Police	CP	Dato'; Rusdi Mohd Isa; DIMP PGDK PGPP JSM PSPP BSK PPA PJPN	25 June 2025	1 year and 143 days	
Narcotics Crime Investigation Department (NCID)	Commissioner of Police	CP	Dato'; Hussein Omar Khan; DPMS DIMP PGPP JMN PSPP PPS PPA PKN	21 July 2025	1 year and 117 days	
Logistic & Technology Department (Log)	Commissioner of Police	CP	Datuk; Redzuan Abd Hamid; DMSM PSPP PPS PPA	6 March 2026	1 year and 234 days	
Integrity and Standards Compliance Department (ISCD)	Commissioner of Police	CP	Dato'; Aida Abdul Hamid; DPMT PSPP PPA	6 March 2026	254 days	
Crime Prevention and Community Safety Department (CPCSD)	Commissioner of Police	CP	Dato'; Noor Hisam Nordin; DIMP JSM PSPP PPS PPA PNBB PJPN	15 June 2026	153 days	
Traffic Enforcement and Investigation Department (TEID)	Commissioner of Police	CP	Dato' Sri; Muhammed Hasbullah Ali; SSAP DIMP DMPN PSPP ACM AMP PPA PKN	6 January 2026	313 days	

==== Management Department ====
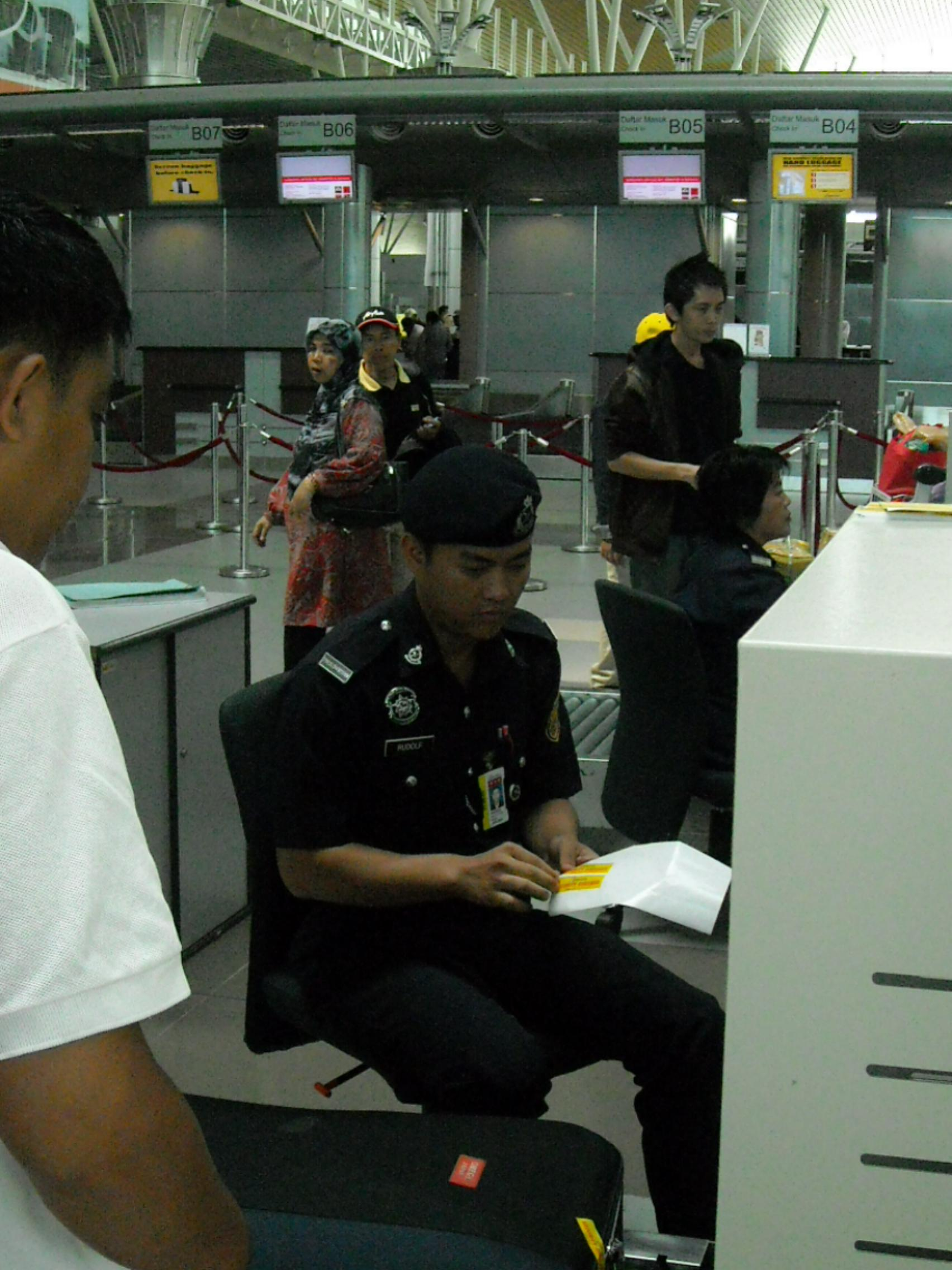
RMP auxiliary officer during a management task

The Management Department is tasked with the routine of management and administration affairs of the RMP. This department is also the "nerve centre" of the RMP and acts as the support services platform for the rest of the force.

Functions

1. Service / Designation – Includes: Recruitment, Service Records Administration, Confirmations, Promotions, Transfers, Salaries & Allowances Administration and Retirements.
2. General Administration And Policy – Includes: General Administration, Research & Development, Civil Affairs, Welfare, Sports And PERKEP (Persatuan Keluarga Polis or Police's Family Association, generally social activities for the families of the policemen)
3. Training – Includes: Basic Course, Development Courses, Further Studies and Rehabilitation Courses.

Branches

1. Administration
2. Welfare
3. Training
4. Research & Development
5. Services / Designation
6. Public Affairs
7. Public Relations
8. Intake
9. Ceremonies
10. Camp Commandant
11. RMP Sports Council

The Management Department is headed by a Director with the rank of Commissioner of Police (CP) and assisted by four Deputy Directors namely Deputy Director of Management (Training), Deputy Director of Management (Administration), Deputy Director of Management (Services/Staffing) and Deputy Director of Management (Human Resource Policy Division).

==== Special Branch ====
This department is responsible for collecting intelligence for national security. Its role is to collect security intelligence related to both domestic and external threats, intercept subversive activities by extremist groups and individuals which could threaten the nation's stability. Also, it is in charge of obtaining, processing, evaluating and disseminating information to other departments and organisations. This department is divided into several branches:

1. Technical Intelligence
2. Social Intelligence
3. External Intelligence
4. Political Intelligence
5. Economic Intelligence
6. Security Intelligence
7. Administration
8. Counter Anti-Terrorisme

The Special Branch is headed by a Director with the rank of Commissioner of Police (CP) and assisted by two Deputy Directors, namely Deputy Directors I and II. In accordance with the policing assignment, the main function of the Special Branch is as provided under section 3(3) and section 20(3) of the Police Act 1967.

==== Criminal Investigation Department (CID) ====
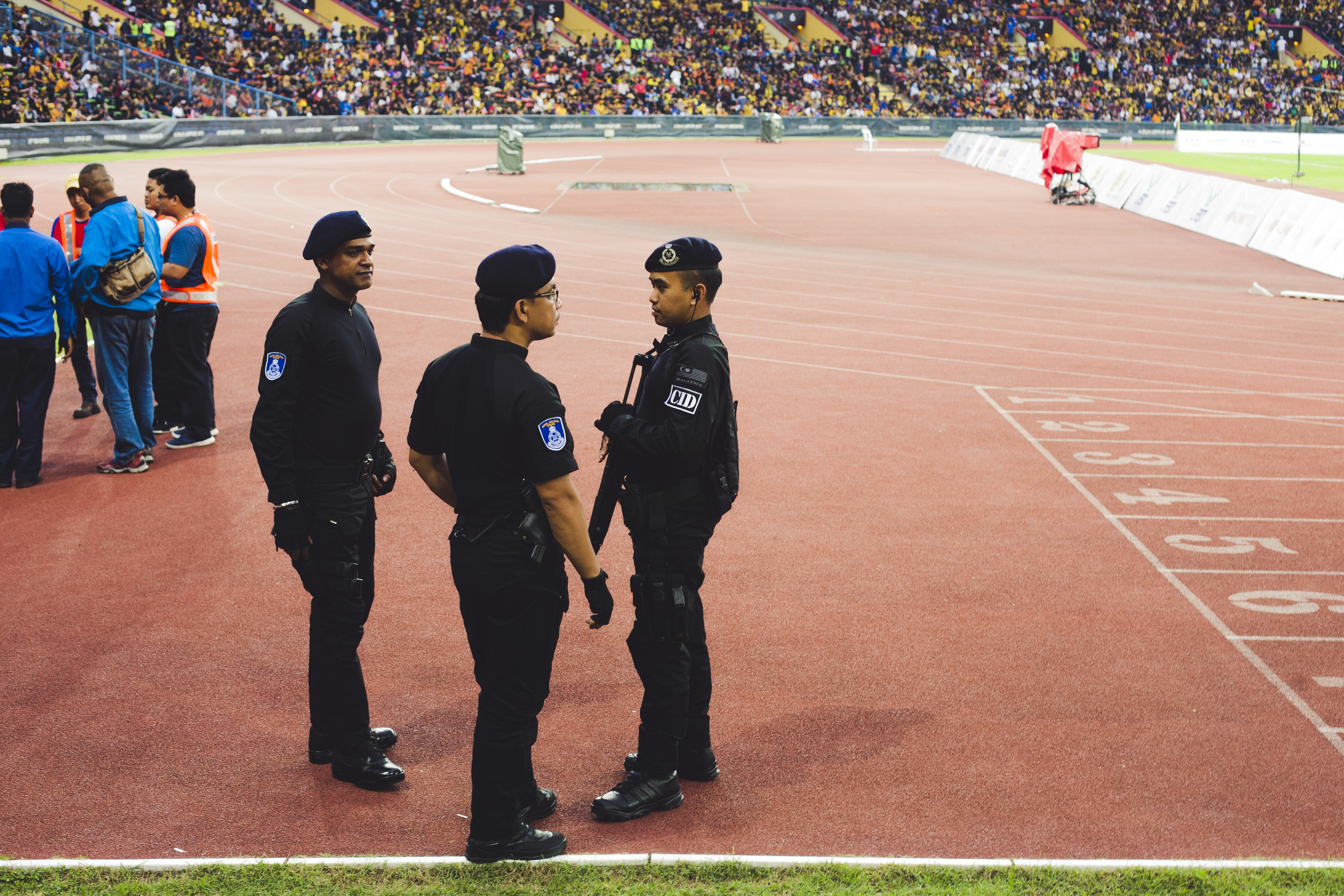
RMP CID Police on Kuala Lumpur SEA GAMES 2017

This department deals with the investigation, arrest and prosecution of both violent crimes such as murder, robbery, rape etc., and less serious crimes such as theft and house-breaking. This department also specialises in investigating gambling, vice and secret societies (triads).

Functions

1. Investigations and detective duties
2. Arrests and prosecutions
3. Enforcement of laws related to gambling, vice and secret societies

Branches

- D1 – Administrative Division
- D2 – Criminal Record Registration Division
- D3 – Anti-Human Trafficking / Migrants Smuggling Prevention Division
- D4 – Operation / Intelligence / Records Divisions
- D5 – Prosecution and Law Divisions
- D6 – Technical Assistance Division
- D7 – Gambling / Vice / Secret Societies Prevention Division
- D8 – Investigation / Planning Division
- D9 – Special Investigation Division
- D10 – Forensic Laboratory Division
- D11 – Sexual / Domestic Violence / Child Abuse Investigation Division
- D12 – National Centre Bureau-Interpol Division
- D13 – Databank DNA Division
- D14 – Organized Crime Investigation Division

The Criminal Investigation Department is headed by a Director with the rank of Commissioner of Police (CP) and assisted by four Deputy Directors, namely the Deputy Director of Criminal Investigation (Intelligence / Operations), Deputy Director of Criminal Investigation (Investigation / Legal), Deputy Director of Criminal Investigation (Organized Crime), Deputy Director Criminal Investigation (Forensic / Databank / DNA / Strategic Planning). The Unit Tindakan Cepat is attached to CID and based at all police contingent headquarters.

===== K9 Unit =====
The K9 Unit of the Royal Malaysia Police is placed under Technical Assistance Division (D6) of the CID. Its headquarters and training centre is located at PULAPOL in Kuala Lumpur. Dogs under the unit are trained for crime prevention, suspect apprehension, bomb detection, narcotic search, missing person search, cadaver recovery and electronic device detection.

The history of police dogs in the force began in 1957 with three Labradors, which served as trekker dogs for the Police Field Force (now known as General Operations Force). In 1959, 10 police offircers volunteered to serve as dog handlers. In 1961, RMP was given government fundings to acquire six dogs from the Commonwealth Forces in United Kingdom and a K9 troop with the name "Detection Dog Unit" was formally established in 1962.

In August 1964, the Home Ministry approved the establishment of the K9 unit under D6 as "Detection Unit". Inspector AP Raja, the founder of the unit, was sent to the UK Metropolitan Police for a 6-months long dog-handling course after the 1964 decision. He came back with six German Shepherds from the UK and conducted further 6-months training for the newly arrived dogs and their assigned handlers at PULAPOL. The unit become operational in June 1968 and the K9 dogs were known as "General Purpose Dogs".

In early 1979, following the government's drive to fight drugs trafficking in the country, four police officer were sent to Front Royal, Virginia to attend a three-months course on how to train narcotics detection dogs. They returned with four Labradors, which were gifted by the US government. Later in July 1979, 24 German Shepherds and 3 Springer Spaniels were bought from the UK to form the narcotic detection division under the K9 unit.

In October 1989, another specialised division for explosives and firearms detection was formed under the K9 unit. It began with four dogs, which consists of Labrador, Springer Spaniel and Border Collie breeds from UK. In 1997, seven officers were sent to the US to attend the Explosives and Firearms Detection Dog's Handlers Course. In 1998, the US government again offered similar training course for seven Malaysian police officers and the ATF gifted 31 dogs to the unit. Since 1998 until 2007, RMP's K9 unit officers have been attending the K9 Explosive Detection Course organised by the US State Department under the Anti-Terrorism Assistance Program at Front Royal.

In November 2010, a new division for cadaver recovery was formed, which started out with six German Shepherds that were trained by the experts from Police Dog Training Centre College of Finland. Dogs under this division were tasked to locate human bodies or body parts in crime scene or missing persons who are presumed to be dead. The cadaver recovery division also collaborated with Universiti Putra Malaysia to carry out an eight months long training at the university's Human Anatomy Department in April 2014.

In November 2018, a K9 Memorial was erected at PULAPOL to commemorate all present and past K9 dogs ever employed by the unit since 1968. The names of all K9 dogs were inscribed on the memorial.

In 2015, there were a total of 135 K9 dogs under the unit nationwide. In January 2025 however, that number dropped to only 68 dogs.

==== Internal Security and Public Order Department (KDN / KA) ====
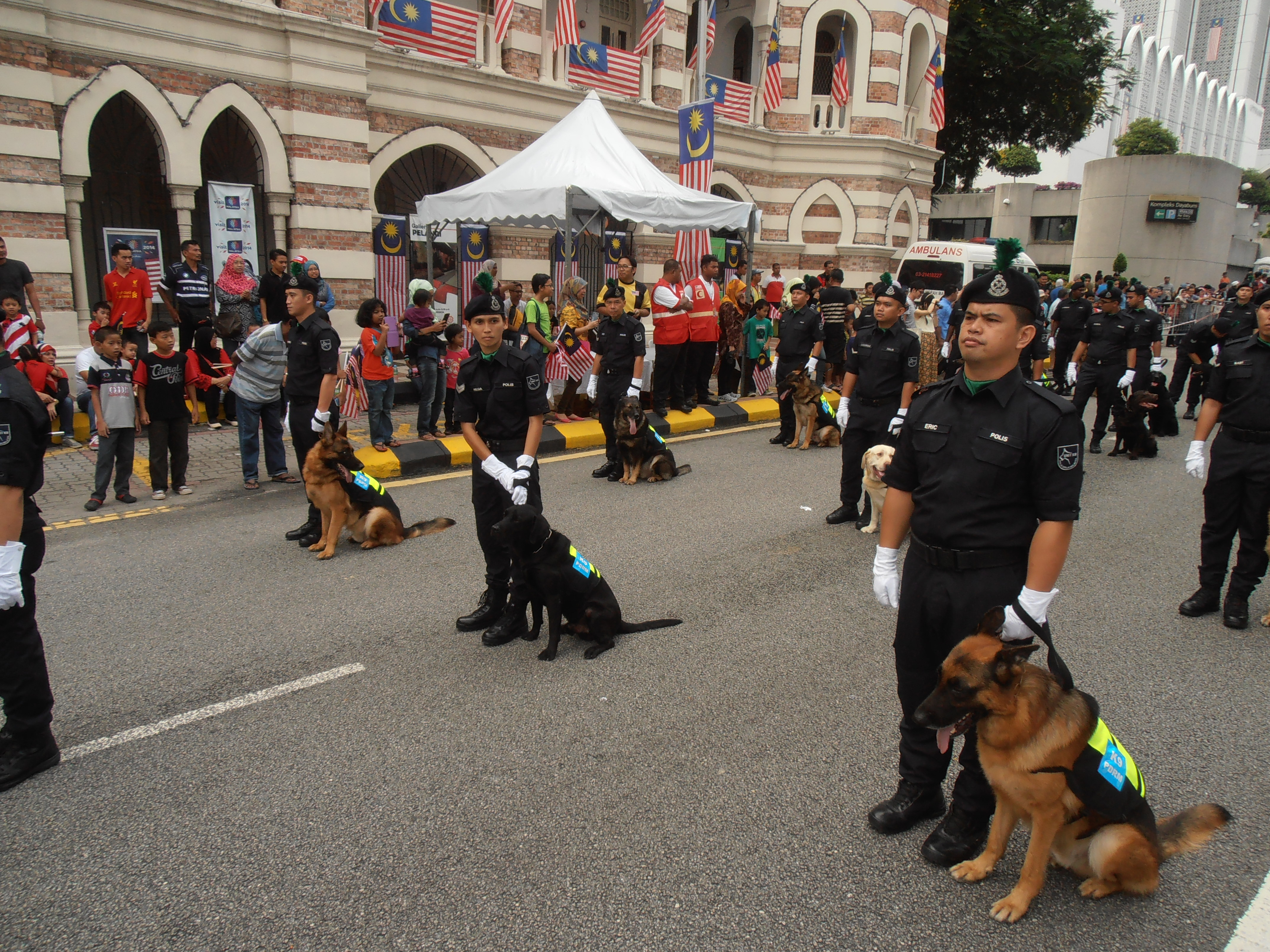
K-9 units of RMP during 57th NDP

This department is tasked with the maintenance of public security and order. It is responsible for traffic control and search & rescue (SAR) operations. In this role, this department cooperates with other agencies, such as the Malaysian Armed Forces and Army / Navy Maritime Patrol to prevent piracy and to secure the national borders.

The Internal Security and Public Order Department is headed by a Commissioner of Police (CP) and assisted by four deputy directors namely the Deputy Director of JKDNKA (Operations) (Deputy Commissioner), Deputy Director of JKDNKA (Pasukan Gerakan Am) (Deputy Commissioner), Deputy Director of JKDNKA (General Policing) (Senior Assistant Commissioner) and Deputy Director of JKDNKA (Pasukan Gerakan Khas) (Senior Assistant Commissioner).

The main branches under this department are:

===== General Operations Force =====
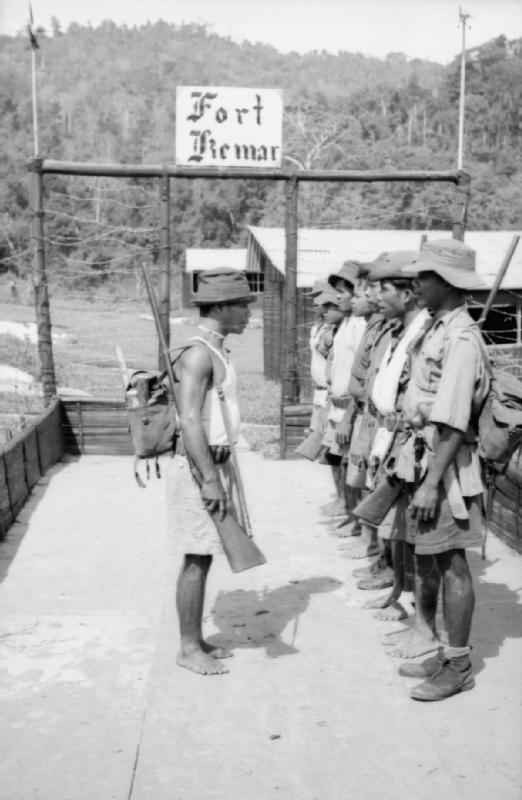
Members of the Senoi Praaq in 1953

The Police Field Force (PFF), organised in battalions, was once the para-military units of the Royal Malaysia Police. The force, which was also known as the Jungle Squad (Pasukan Polis Hutan (PPH) in Malay) was tasked to operate in the jungle fringes in counter-insurgency roles during the Malayan Emergency, Indonesia–Malaysia confrontations and later Communist guerrilla insurgencies along the Malaysian-Thai border and in the jungles of Sabah and Sarawak. When the Malayan Communist Party (MCP) and Clandestine Communist Organisation (CCO) finally gave up their armed struggle in 1989 and 1990, PFF was reorganised as the General Operations Force (GOF) in 1997. The GOF has 19 battalions and the 19th Special Battalion is tasked to provide VIP security.

When established in 1948, the PFF had 19 battalions of which two were made up of indigenous people. These battalions were known as Senoi Praaq Battalions. One battalion was a Special Security Battalion.

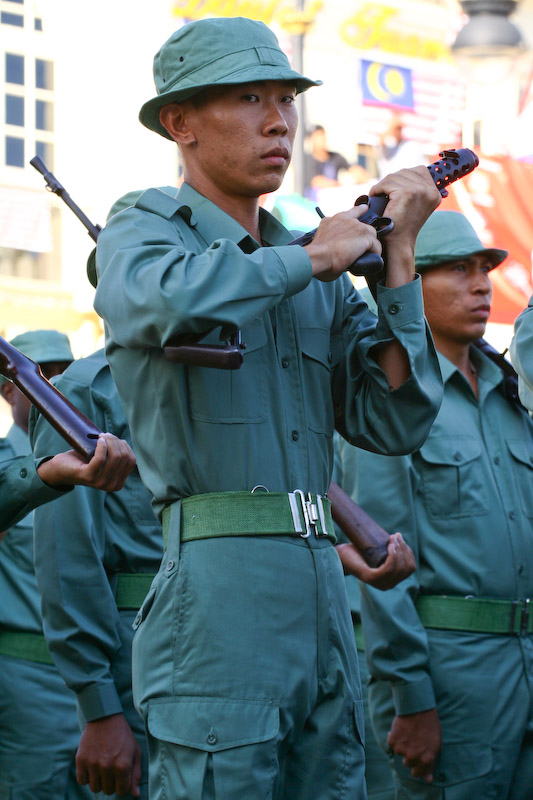
Policemen during a parade displaying the uniforms and equipment of the Jungle Squad, 2007

The 19 battalions are organised into five brigades, each headed by a Superintendent of Police. The North Brigade and Sabah Brigade have four battalions each, the Central Brigade has five battalions, and South-East Brigade and Sarawak Brigade have three battalions each.

It all began in the year 1948, when Malayan Communist Party murdered three European farmers at Sungai Siput, Perak and also murdered the three leaders of Kuomintang (Chinese Nationalist Party). Sir Edward Gent declared an emergency on 7 July 1948 in all Malaya Federations, starting with Perak on 16 June 1948 and Johor on 19 June 1948. To deal with the rebellion and to quash the Communist terrorist threat in the jungle, a military based team was formed in 1948. It was named the Flying Squad and later renamed the Jungle Squad, with its main mission to fight against the Communists. The first Jungle Squad unit was established at Sik, Kedah in 1949. Training centres were opened in Sungai Buluh, Selangor and in Dusun Tua, Hulu Langat, Selangor which was known as Field Force Special Training Centre (SLPPH). In 1964, SLPPH was transferred to Kroh, Perak then changed to Kentonmen, Ulu Kinta, Perak. After being renamed the General Operations Force or Pasukan Gerakan Am in 1997, SLPPH is now known as Sekolah Latihan Pasukan Gerakan Am (General Operations Force Training Centre, SLPGA).

So far, there are two Senoi Praaq battalions specialising in search and rescue operations. After VAT 69 was absorbed into Pasukan Gerakan Khas, along with anti-terrorist police force and Special Action Unit (UTK – Unit Tindakan Khas), a special platoon of PGA, Tiger Platoon was established.

===== Police Counter–Terrorism Units =====
When the threat of terrorism started to increase after the 11 September terrorist attack in United States, followed up by a series of bombings in Bali and Jakarta, Indonesia and in Malaysia, the RMP has formed 2 anti-terrorism corps. These two elite forces are known as Pasukan Gerakan Khas (PGK) and Unit Gempur Marin (UNGERIN).

====== Pasukan Gerakan Khas ======
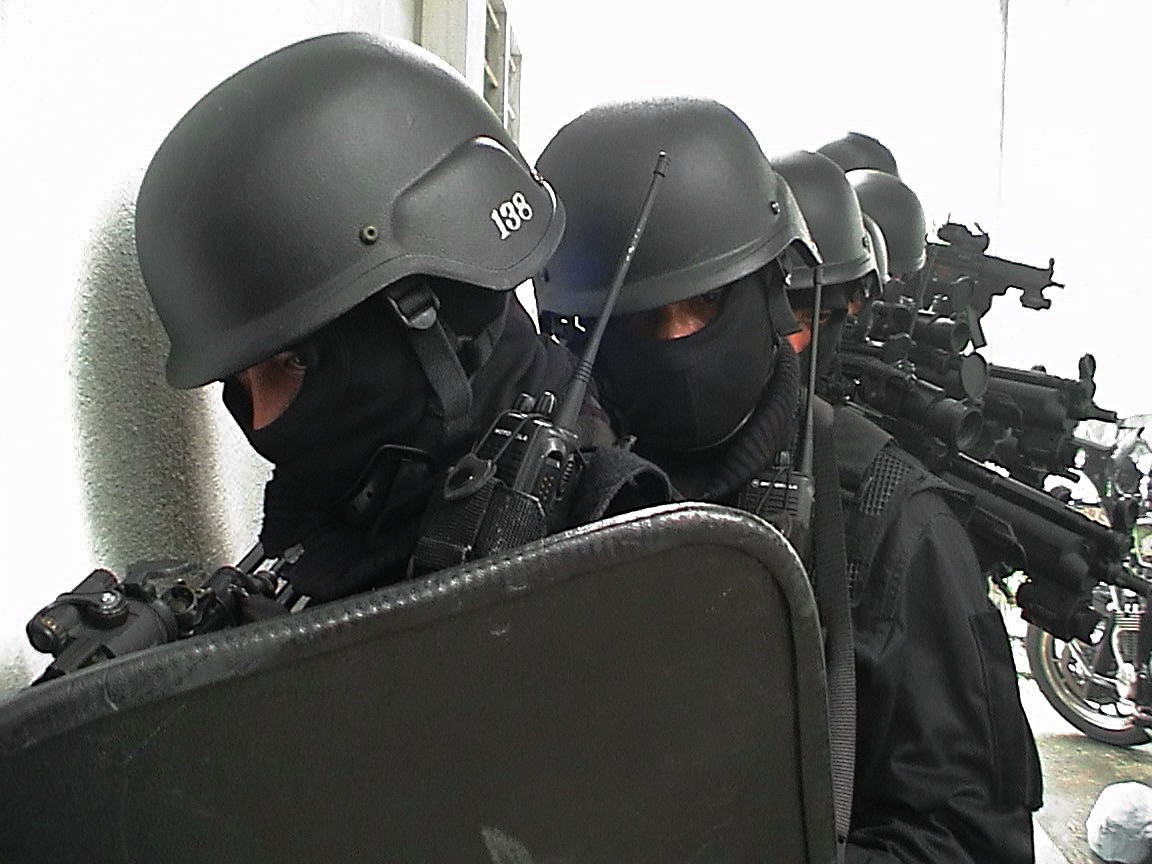
RMP counter-terrorist force Pasukan Gerakan Khas during Close Quarters Combat drill at a 'killing house' in Bukit Aman, Kuala Lumpur.

Pasukan Gerakan Khas is a major elite force in the Royal Malaysia Police, which is composed of 69 Commando (VAT 69) and Special Actions Unit (UTK).

This team was first merged in 1997 and became known as the Maroon Berets. However, this integration did not last and in 2003 it was separated. The VAT 69 changed to the Sandy Brown Berets, honoured by British 22nd Special Air Service (SAS). However, both units serve under the Pasukan Gerakan Khas and are under the command of a Senior Assistant Commissioner II.

This special counter-terrorism police team is also involved in some operations within Malaysia, including military operations with Malaysian Army 22nd Commando Regiment Grup Gerak Khas against the Al-Ma'unah organisation formed in Bukit Jenalik, Sauk, Perak. This team also served under the United Nations in Timor Leste and in the search and rescue operation of 700 officers and members of Indonesian National Police BRIMOB (Brigade Mobil) that were lost and trapped during the tsunami incident in Aceh, Indonesia at the end of 2005. This team also cooperated with Criminal Investigation Division to fight against dangerous crimes, such as when the PGK successfully tracked down the notorious 'Gang M16' which comprised several ethnic Chinese criminals, including the group leader who was an ex-serviceman of Singapore, and the leader Gang 13 (Mat Komando), as well as other operations. The motto of VAT 69 is WARISAN DARAH PERWIRA (Literal meaning: INHERITANCE OF THE BLOOD OF WARRIORS), while for the UTK it is TANGKAS BANTERAS GANAS (Literal meaning: QUICK TO OVERCOME TERROR).

====== UNGERIN ======
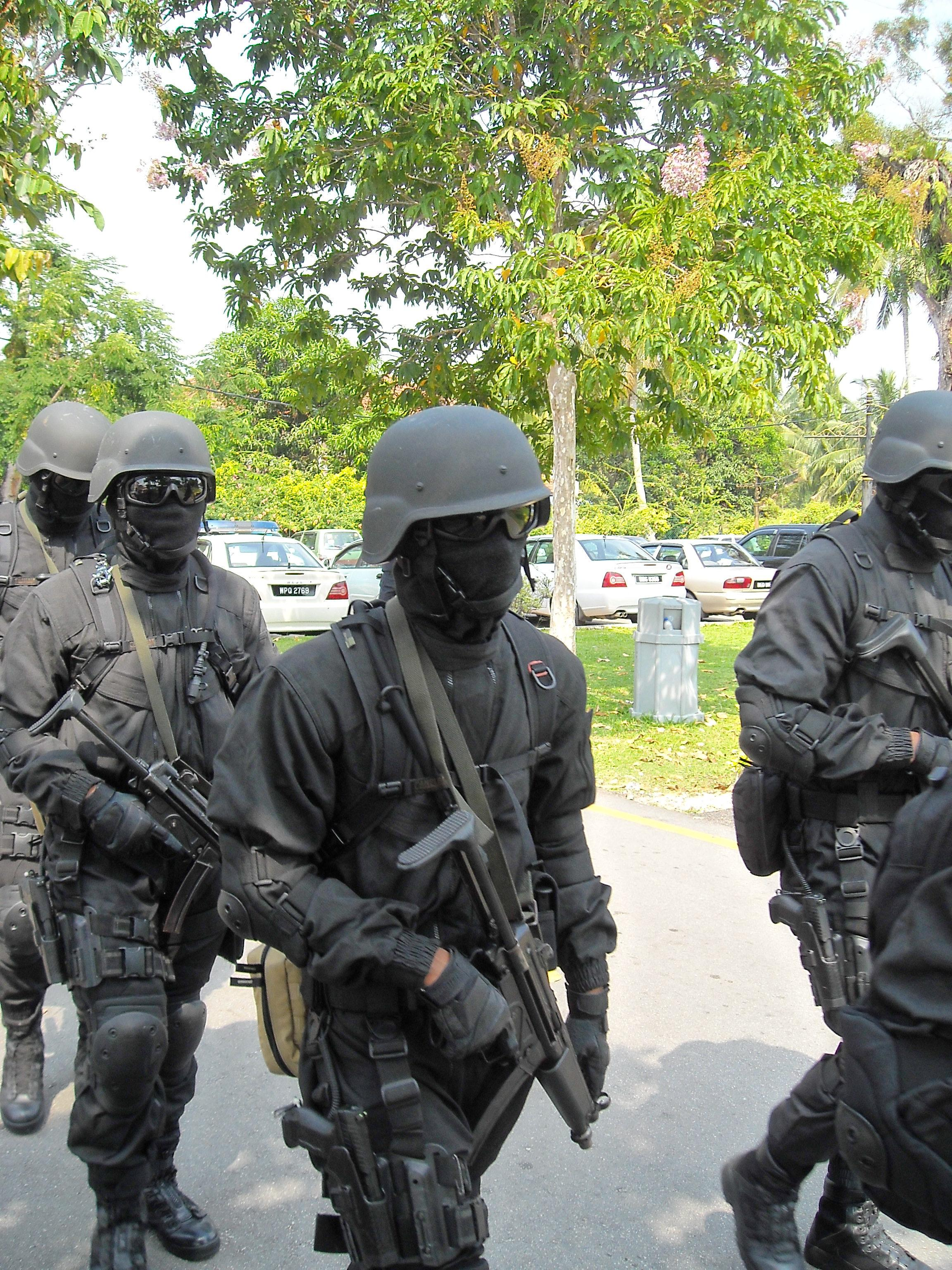
Masked Marine Assault Team (MAST) operators armed with the MP5A3 submachine gun while on duty at Muar city

Unit Gempur Marin (UNGERIN) (Marine Combat Unit) was established in 2006 and it was fully operational by the end of 2007 with the first name as the Unit Selam Tempur due to the pressing need to suppress the pirate attacks alongside the coastal area of Malacca Straits and open sea area of South China Sea which were continuously widespread from time to time despite various efforts done to overcome the problem. The members received special training from the United States after realising the need to form a special unit to secure the national waters and river fronts from any untoward incidents. This unit is placed under formation Marine Police Branch which is based in the Marine Police Base at Kampung Aceh, Sitiawan, Perak and Lahad Datu, Sabah. It has a big role in handling threats from pirates, robbery, kidnapping and hijacking of ships and terrorist attacks in national waters. The 30 members of UNGERIN are trained by instructors from US Navy SEALs and US Coast Guard in Langkawi and Kota Kinabalu and are armed with special weaponry, such as Glock 19, MP5 and Colt M4A1 (possibly supported by the United States) and utilise maritime anti-terrorist tactics employed by the units of United States Navy commandos. For the unit's restructuring, the name of UST was changed to Unit Gempur Marin or UNGERIN in the year 2008. Its eventual goal is to have 200 operators on standby with UNGERIN.

In the first phase, the 30-personnel strong candidates is to undergo training in Langkawi and Kota Kinabalu, by instructors from Navy SEALs. Besides the basic diving training, they will be trained with other basic training, including tactical warfare, marksmanship, sniping, bomb disposal, direct action, sabotage, counter-terrorism, and intelligence gathering and paramedic training, along with special missions which are normally handled by special forces.

===== Federal Reserve Unit =====
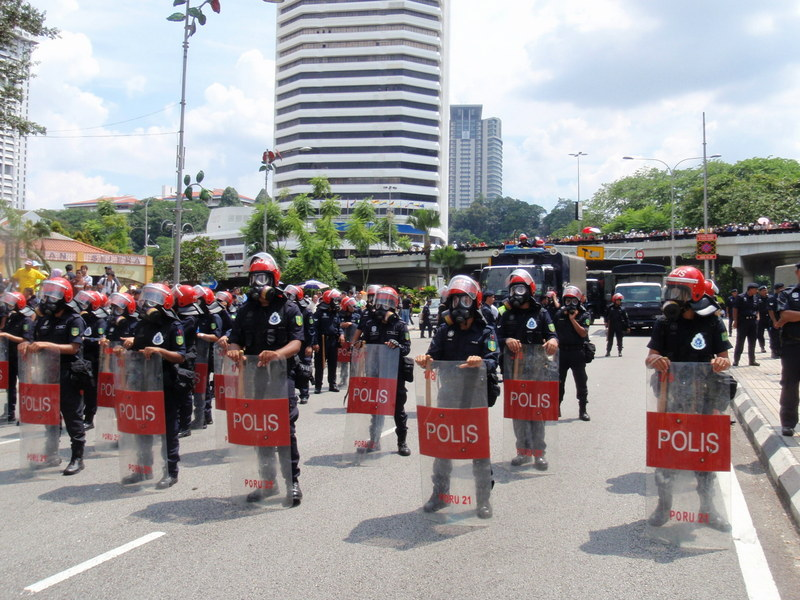
The FRU during Bersih 3.0 rally

The Federal Reserve Unit (Malay: Pasukan Simpanan Persekutuan) is better known with the abbreviation FRU. Their role is riot suppression, crowd control, disaster relief and rescue, as well as special operations assistance. Established on 5 December 1955, it consisted of only 3 troops then. The FRU played a role in resolving some high-profile riots, including the racial riots of 13 May 1969 and in the combined operations to catch Ibrahim Libya in the Memali Incident of Baling, Kedah which ended with 16 deaths including Ibrahim and 3 police officers.

The FRU is directly under the Inspector-General of Police. This unit is independent and is able to be rapidly deployed.

As the premiere public order unit of the RMP, the FRU is designed, equipped and specially trained for duties in suppressing and dismissing riots and illegal assemblies. Aside from the stated roles above, the unit is also tasked with the following functions:

1. Public Control – during mass public assembly, such as VIPs visitors, sports event, mass rallies and processions,
2. To deal with pre and post “Chemical, Biological, Radiological And Nuclear" threats,
3. Disaster Rescue assistance including floods, fires, train derailments, landslides, aircraft crashes, etc.; to rescue, prevent theft, and area inclusion involved,
4. Crime prevention in helping a District Police Chief in the area which particular experience sharp rise frequent a crime rate or crime happened, to certain term,
5. Massive operation, such as encircle and find, heat and arrested on extremist groups or gangster elements, intensive patrol and Curfew enforcement.

The FRU is led by a Commander, and assisted by a Deputy Commander. They report to the Director of Public Order. They are aided by a few Staff Officers and known as Commanding Headquarters. FRU each in led by one Commanding Officer. Every FRU troops in led by one Troop Officer. FRU training centre presided by a Commandant. Per unit and FRU training centre has a membership to aid the administration and known as group headquarters unit.

FRU was presented Colours in 1971, which were replaced with a new design in 1997. These are given by King of Malaysia as an appreciate charity service and FRU service during a unit establishment for maintain a national public order. During official ceremonies where the FRU affect as a parent body or detachment; such as Guard of Honour, Mess Night of FRU or Parade in conjunction with Police Anniversaries and FRU Anniversaries, FRU Colour may be brought out in public and am being marched by directing and IGP approval, Internal Security and Public Order Director or FRU Commander.

===== C4-i Implementations System =====
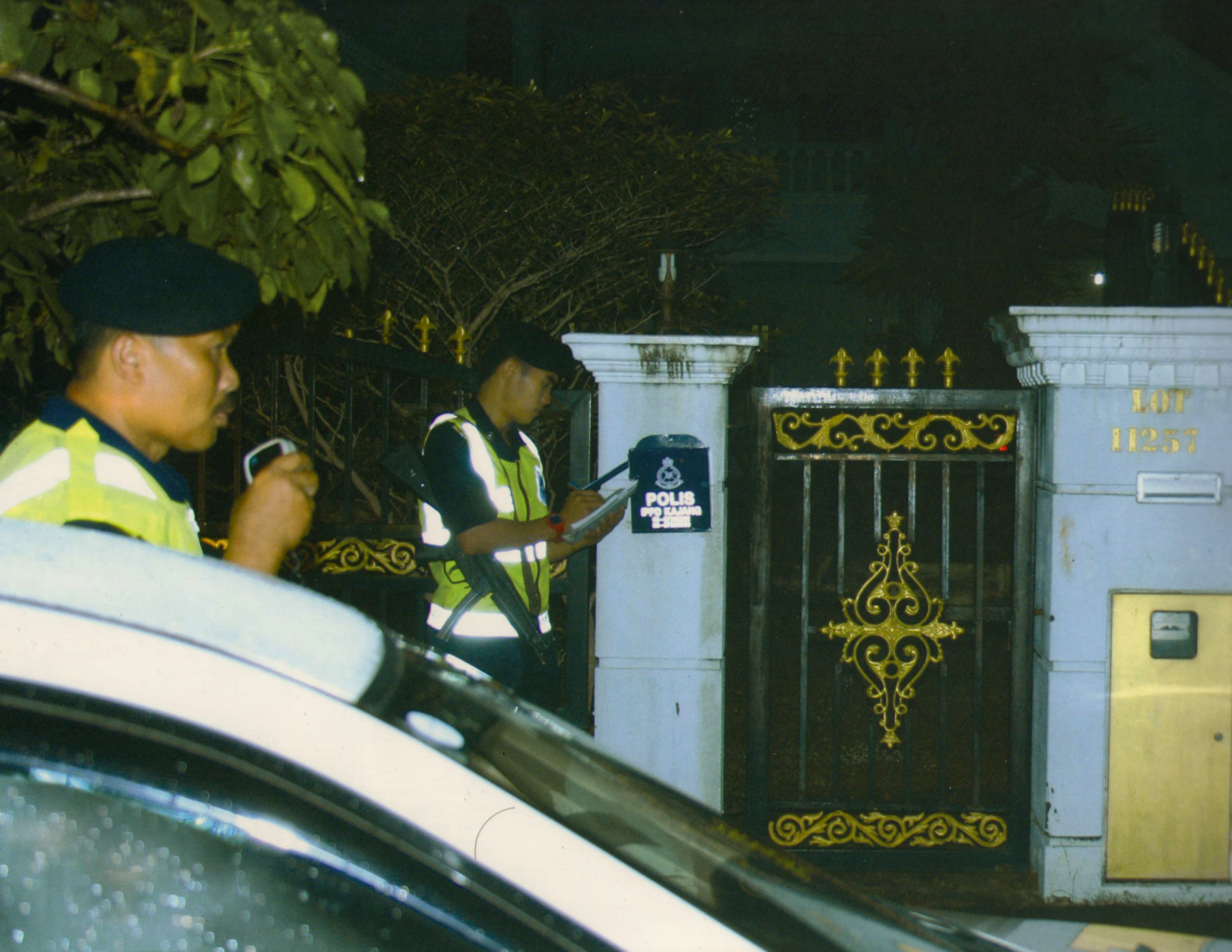
The Police Patrol personnel monitoring on the residence of VIP property. The police patrol mobile unit is a part of the C4-i Implementation System.

C4-i Implementation System (abbreviation for Command, Control, Communications, Computer-Integrated) unit is based at Police Control Centre in all police contingents in Malaysia. This unit is assigned to patrol the city and the suburbs. This unit was first established in Bukit Aman and Kuala Lumpur is the first contingent to implement this system. This unit is equipped with the CCTV system which is installed in different parts of the city and monitored by the Contingent Control Centre and each patrol car is also equipped with C4-i's system connected to a laptop. The C-4i also plays a role in forming Rakan Cops in 2006 to foster closer ties with the civilian community. Since then, the crime rates in major towns have decreased and brought about good reviews on the C4-i's and Rakan Cops implementation.

===== Traffic Branch =====
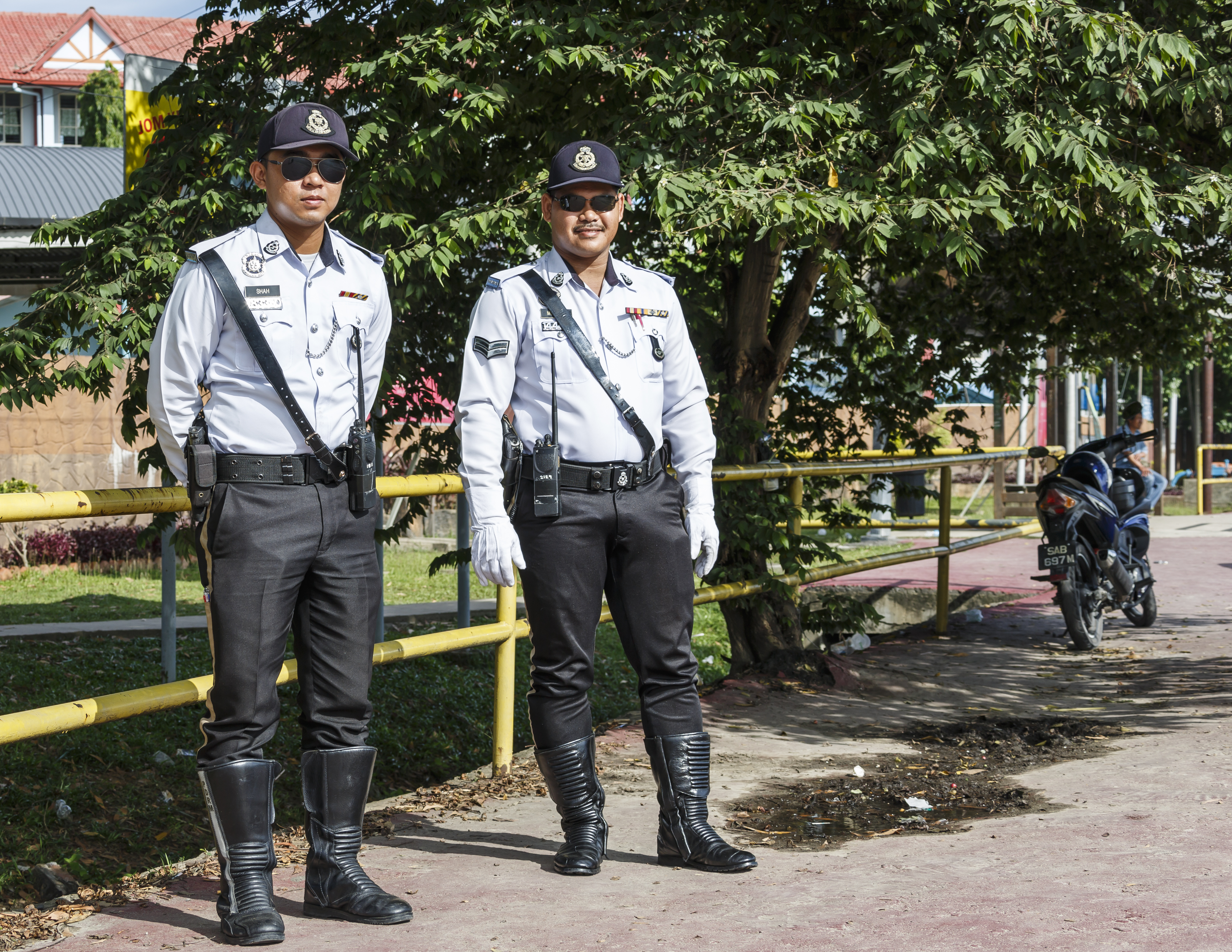
Traffic police officers

Problems in Malaysia began in the late 1920s when motorised vehicles began to hover on the road that used to be covered only by bicycle, tricycle, rickshaw and bullock carts. This situation creates a new task for the police forces, which is to maintain and control the traffic. In 1928 and 1929, the traffic branch was established in big cities, which is Kuala Lumpur, Ipoh and Seremban. Singapore, which at that time was part of Straits Settlements have set up traffic branch earlier, which is in 1918. In other cities, the task of controlling the traffic falls on regular general duty policemen.

Because of the increasingly serious traffic problems due to the addition of vehicles, the traffic branch was set up in each state and other big cities gradually. In 1976, the central traffic branch was set up at the Bukit Aman. It is responsible for reviewing, designing and conducting research on traffic branch enforcement, training, engineering, records management and traffic law. In 2016, Traffic Branch was officially independent from Internal Security and Public Order Department.

===== Mounted Police Unit =====
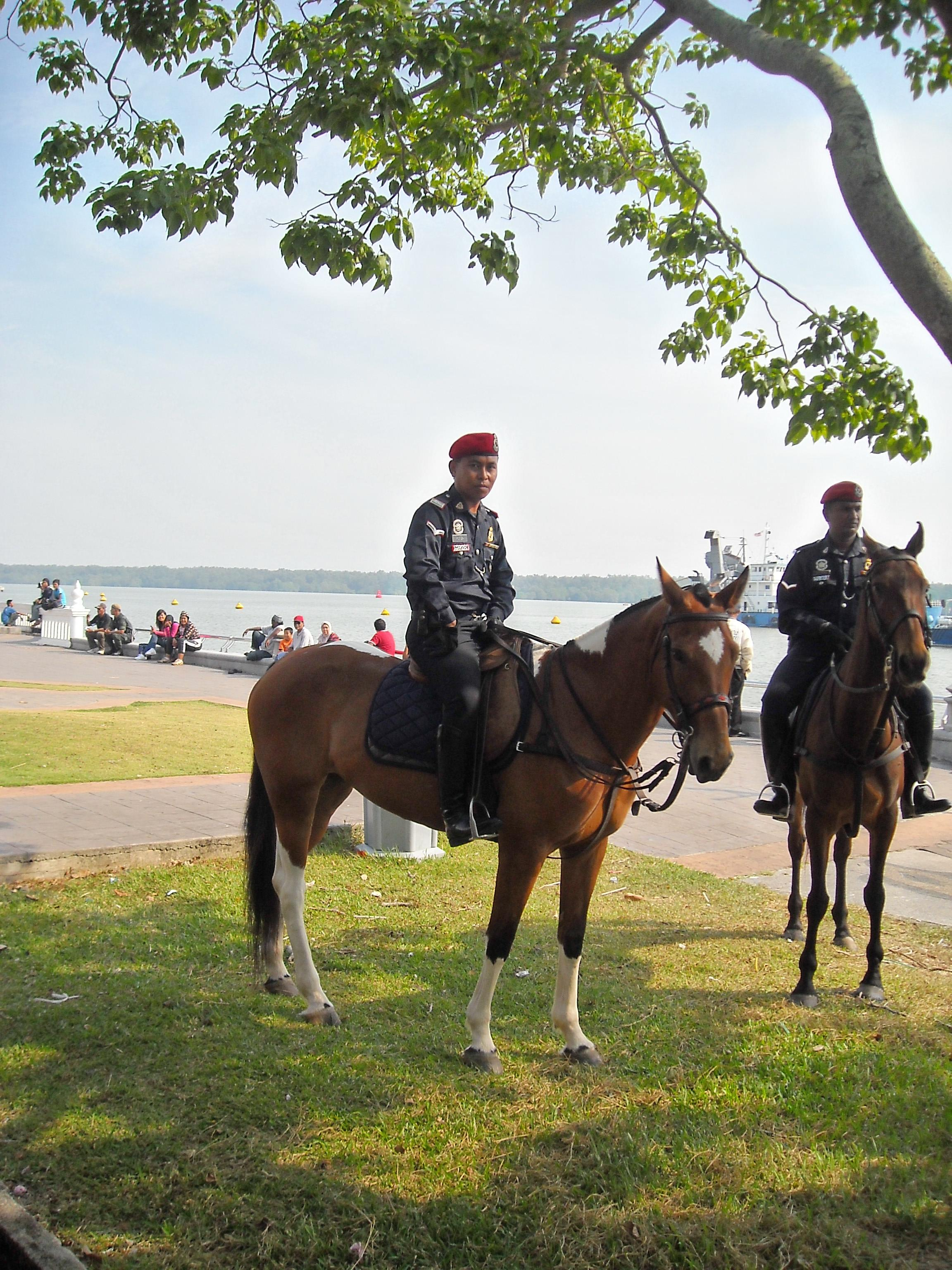
Mounted police unit

Mounted Police Unit was formed in 1882 by Captain R.S.F Walker when he was appointed as Deputy Commissioner of Perak Police. At the beginning of its formation, this unit has been given the responsibility to eliminate the rampant robbers in Segenting Kamunting, Perak. In 1915, this unit expanded its role as a Personal Guard to DYMM Sultan of Perak. Members of the Mounted Police Unit at that time consisted of those seconded from the Malay States Guides Force.

===== Malaysian Control Centre =====
The Malaysian Control Centre PDRM, or the Polis Diraja Malaysia (Royal Malaysia Police) Control Centre, serves as a central hub for coordinating and managing law enforcement activities across Malaysia. The Control Centre plays a crucial role in various law enforcement operations, including emergency response, traffic management, crime prevention, and disaster management. It serves as a communication and coordination center where information from various sources, such as emergency calls, surveillance cameras, and field reports, is gathered, analyzed, and acted upon in real-time.

===== Marine Operations Force =====
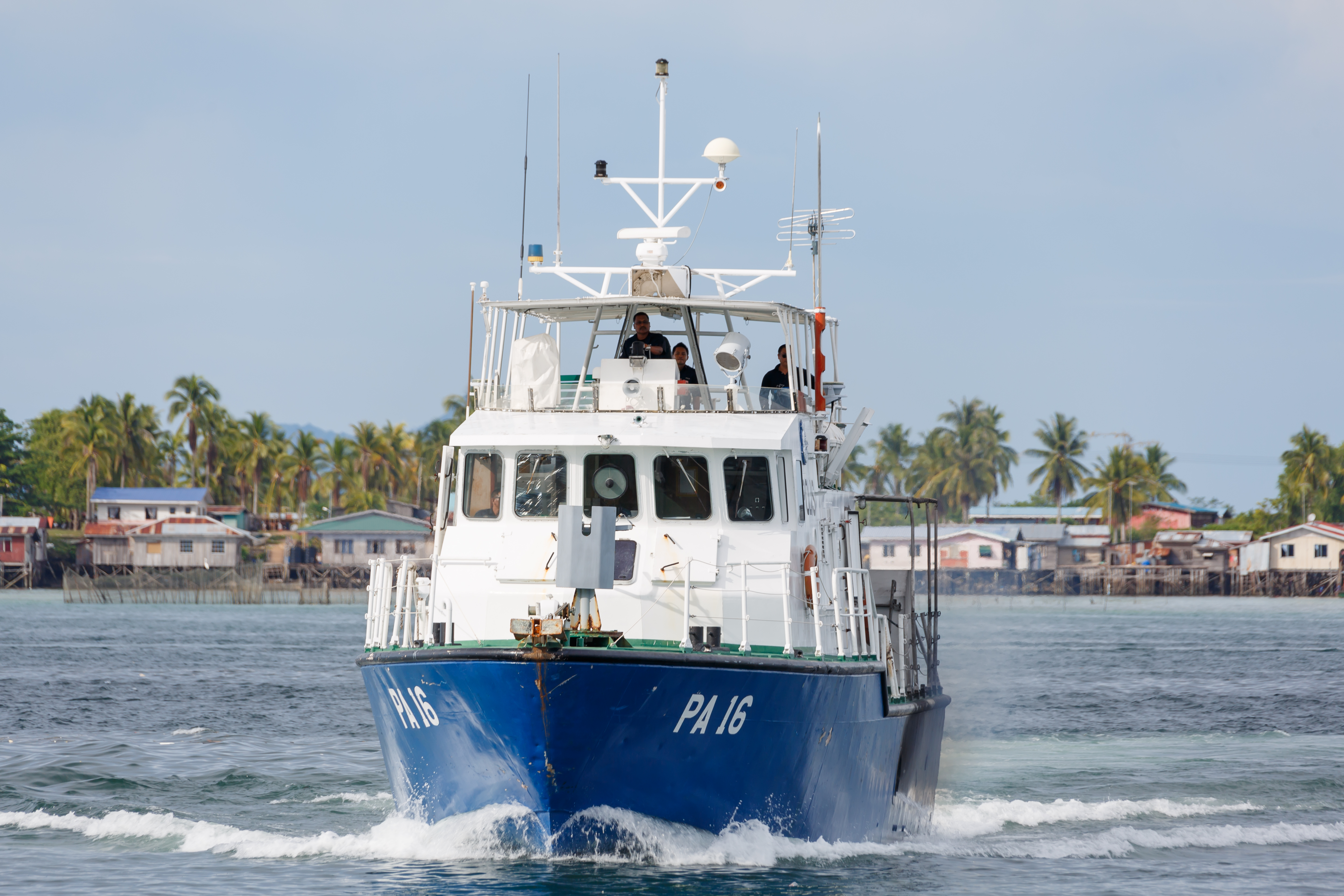
PA-16 police boats patrolling at Semporna coast, Sabah

The Marine Operations Force or Malay: Pasukan Gerakan Marin is the Marine Police division tasked with maintaining law and order and co-ordinating search and rescue operations in the Malaysian Maritime Zone and on the high seas. Its responsibility was to maintain security at the parts in Penang and the Straits of Johor. On 6 February 2009, the name of Malaysian Marine Police was changed and known as Pasukan Gerakan Marin (English: Marine Operations Force). The rename of the organisation was launched by the Minister of Home Affair, Dato' Seri Syed Hamid Albar at PULAMAR (Abbreviation of Pusat Latihan Marin or Marine Police Training Centre), Tampoi, Johor Bahru and witness by Tan Sri Musa Hassan, the Inspector General of Police and all senior police officers and the media.

It operates from five regional bases around the peninsula and East Malaysia. Each of these regional bases are organised similarly to the Neighbourhood Police Centres of the land divisions, and conduct patrols within their maritime sectors. The PGM conducts round-the-clock patrols in Malaysian territorial waters from its five regional bases, in an area of more than 142, 393 km^{2} and 450, 233 km^{2} for EEZ as well as 4490 km for the coastlines. It is also responsible for maintaining law and order on most of Malaysia's islands. The PGM use 15 PZ class patrol boats, 33 PX class, 68 PA/PT/PC/PLC and 4 PSC/PGR/PAR class patrol boats. The branch have five main bases, 11 small bases and 24 forward bases.

===== Air Operations Force (Formerly Air Wing Unit) =====
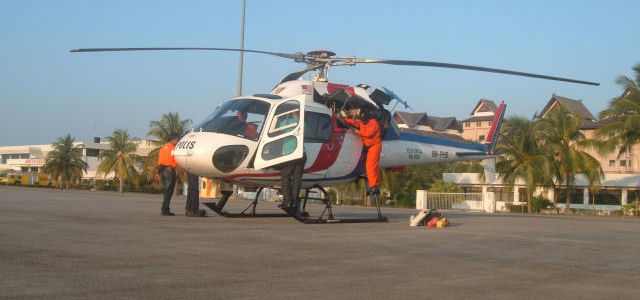
RMP helicopter during pre-flight

Royal Malaysia Police Air Operations Force or Pasukan Gerakan Udara (PGU) is a special aviation unit of Royal Malaysia Police. It has a vital role in maintaining national security with thorough surveillance and patrol from the air. Established on 1 February 1979. The commander of the unit was known as Air Wing Chief initially. Started police operations with 4 Cessna CU 206G officially on 7 April 1980 with operations focused in Peninsula of Malaysia. Now, PGU owns 10 helicopters AS355 F2 and N series, six CE 208 Caravan, five Pilatus PC-6 Porter, four Cessna 172Sp, and five Beechcraft KingAir 350 (KingAir 350 is an advanced aircraft with latest Proline-21 avionics system). Police Air Unit has four bases in Sultan Abdul Aziz Shah Airport (Subang Airport), PLUUP (Ipoh Airport), Sarawak Base (Kuching International Airport) and Sabah Base (Kota Kinabalu International Airport).

==== Commercial Crime Investigation Department ====
This department's main function is to investigate, arrest, and prosecute offenders committing white-collar crimes such as fraud, breach of trust, cyber-crimes, forgery, counterfeiting etc. The department was divided several branches:

- Forensic Investigation Accounting.
- Financial Investigations.
- Corporate Investigation.
- Investigation of Other Counterfeiting.
- Cyber & Multimedia Crime Investigation.
- Operations/Technical Assistance.
- International Administration/Cooperation.
- Research/Intelligence.
- Inspectorate.
- Legislation.
- Secretariat Division

The Commercial Crime Investigation Department is headed by a Director Commissioner of Police (CP) and assisted by two Deputy Directors namely Deputy Director I (Investigation) and Deputy Director II (Administration)..

==== Narcotics Crime Investigation Department ====
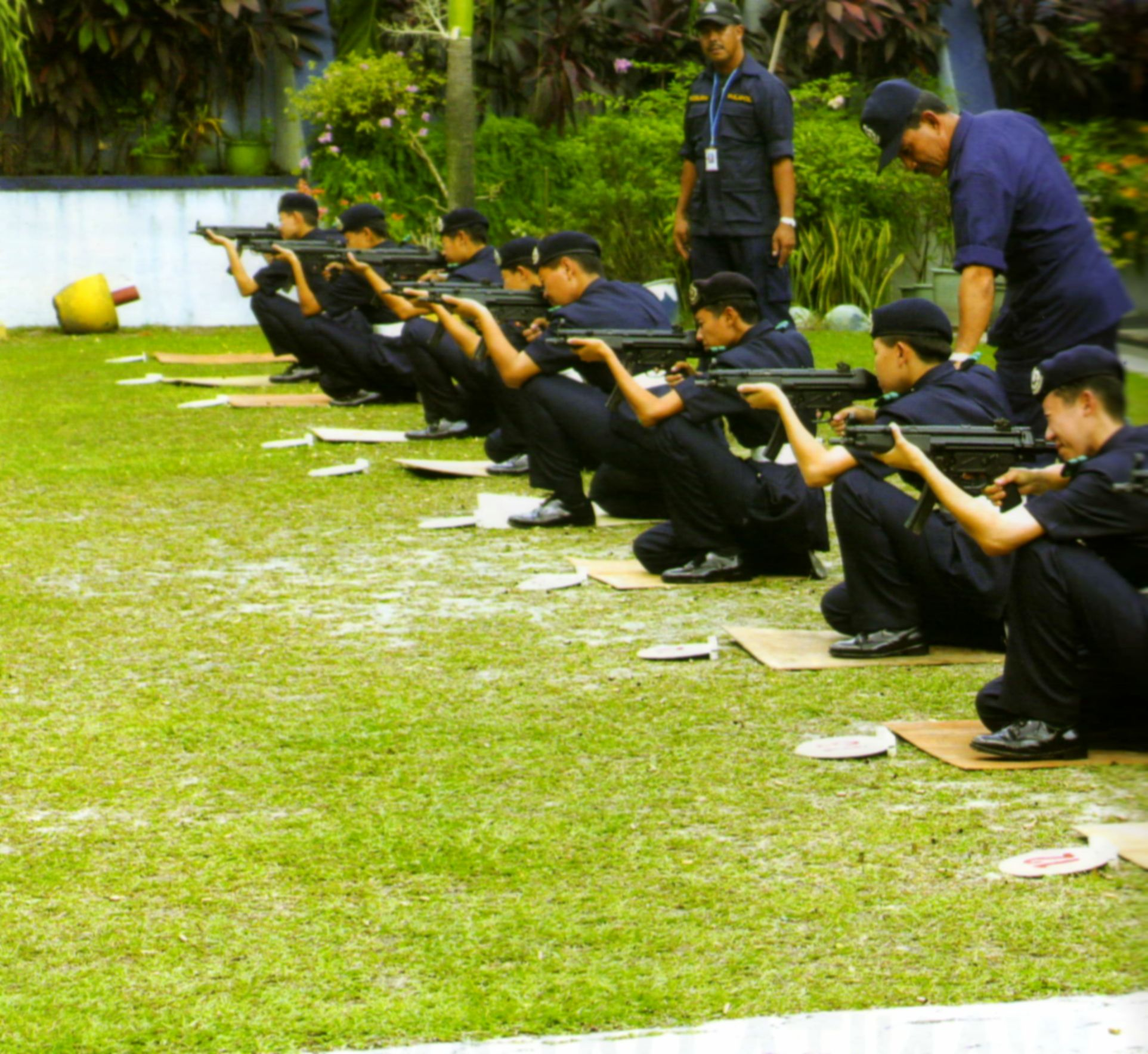
Recruits of RMP with senior police officers at a shooting course, armed with MP5 sub-machineguns at PULAPOL Kuala Lumpur, Malaysia.

This department's function is to fight against dangerous drugs by enforcing the law to stop and reduce the demand and supply of dangerous drugs.

Functions

1. Enforce against drug abuse and drug trafficking
2. Collect, study, assess and spread drug-related information
3. Investigate distributors activities and drug trafficking syndicates
4. Fight drug smuggling activities including chemicals used to process drugs
5. Implement prevention of drug abuse programs
6. Exchange data/information with domestic and international agencies
7. Keep records and statistics related to drug distribution and other drug-related matters
8. Surveillance activity for former drug offenders or members formerly associated with drug trafficking syndicates
9. Provide training locally/overseas for officers / members of narcotics department
10. Attend the meetings, seminars related to drugs, locally/overseas

Branches

1. Special Investigation Divisions
2. Coordinator Part / International-relations
3. Administrative Divisions
4. Detention Divisions
5. Estate Stripping
6. Interrogate
7. Expert / Technical Assistance
8. Record / Statistics
9. Registration
10. Logistics Divisions
11. Airport Customs Staff

Narcotics Crime Investigation Division is headed by a Director with the rank of Commissioner of Police (CP) and assisted by two Deputy Directors namely Deputy Director (Enforcement / Prevention / General Policing) and Deputy Director (Property Forfeiture / Legal / Detention).

==== Logistics and Technology Department ====
The Logistics and Technology Department provides equipment needed in the RMP.

Functions

1. Operate operating budget and RMP's development
2. Plan, manage, operate and maintain communications, information technology, transport and weaponry
3. Manage projects and maintain buildings and properties
4. Manage turnover and supply of general equipment
5. Manage RMP's assets

Branches

1. Naziran's Branch / Administration
2. Communications Branch
3. Information Technology Branch
4. Transport Branch
5. Finance Branch
6. Technical Turnover
7. Weaponry Branch
8. General Turnover
9. Part of the Building
10. Disposal / Stock / Verification / Write-off

The Logistics and Technology Department is headed by a Director with the rank of Commissioner of Police (CP) and assisted by three Deputy Directors, namely Deputy Director I (Transportation / Information Technology / Communication / Development / Maintenance), Deputy Director II (Finance / Asset Management / General Policing) and Deputy Director III (Procurement / Police Supply Center / Armament).

==== Integrity and Standards Compliance Department ====
The Integrity and Standards Compliance Department was officially established by the Inspector General of Police on 25 July 2014 and as the 9th department within the RMP. The department is headed by a Director with the rank of Commissioner of Police and assisted by two Deputy Directors, namely the Deputy Director (Integrity) and the Deputy Director (Standard Compliance).

Branches

1. Manage Administration / General Policing
2. Religion and Counseling Division
3. Complaint Management
4. Compliance
5. Operational Intelligence
6. Investigations / Legislation / Case Studies

==== Crime Prevention and Community Safety Department ====
The Crime Prevention and Community Safety Department was established on 9 June 2014 headed by a Director with the rank of Commissioner of Police and assisted by two Deputy Directors namely the Deputy Director (Strategic Planning) and the Deputy Director (Operations).

Sections of CPCSD

CPCSD is divided into five (5) divisions where each division is headed by a Principal Assistant Director (KPP) with the rank of SAC and a Secretary with the rank of ACP with the following responsibilities:

1. Policy / Resource Management Division

- Administration
- Employment
- Financial
- Logistics Support
- Exercise

2. Ground Operations Division

- Mobile Patrol Vehicle (MPV)
- Motorcycle Patrol Unit (URB)
- Patrol Bits
- E-Sector

3. Support Resource Coordination Division

- Auxiliary Police (PB)
- Police Volunteer Reserve (SSP)
- Suksis
- Police Cadet Corps

4. Community Policing Division

- Integrated Collaboration
- Community Policing
- Association / School Coordination
- Business Community
- Rakan Cop

5. Data Collection / Analysis Section

- Crime Data Analysis
- Data collection
- Safe City Monitoring System (SPBS)

6. JPJKK Secretariat

==== Traffic Enforcement and Investigation Department ====
Traffic Investigation and Enforcement Department was officially established on 25 March 2016 in conjunction with the 209th Police Day Celebration by the then Prime Minister Dato' Seri Najib Razak announced that the Traffic Branch will be separated from the Internal Security and Public Order Department into a new department, the "Traffic Investigation and Enforcement Department". He also personally presided over the inauguration ceremony.

Six Principal Assistant Directors (KPP) with the rank of SAC namely, KPP General Police, KPP Enforcement, KPP Investigation/ Legislation, KPP Summons Management, KPP Secretariat/ Traffic Control and KPP Procurement/ Development/ Finance.

This department's main function is leading traffic management department with the following main service core:-

- Investigation and Legislation
- Enforcement
- Traffic Control
- Summons Management

The Traffic Investigation and Enforcement Department is headed by a Commissioner of Police (CP) and assisted by two Deputy Directors namely Deputy Director (General Policing/ Investigations/ Resources) and Deputy Director (Enforcement/ Traffic Control/ Summons Management).

=== Complaints Commission ===
Non-governmental organisations continued to press the government to create an Independent Police Complaints and Misconduct Commission (IPCMC). In 2005 a Royal Commission of Inquiry into the police had recommended a wide range of reforms, including the establishment of an IPCMC by May 2006. Draft legislation to establish an IPCMC remained under consideration by the Attorney General at the end of the year. A range of other reform recommendations, including repeal or review of laws allowing for detention without trial or requiring police permits for public assemblies, were not implemented.

== Demographics ==
As of 2021, Chinese and Indian constituted around 1.9% and 3% of the 123,000 officers and personnel in the country respectively while the majority rest are populated by the Malays and other natives. Among the reasons of the low Chinese enrollment are the stigma in the community where the children that join the police forces are not considered as good children. Meanwhile, some were restricted from joining due to their inability to achieve a credit score for Bahasa Malaysia during SPM examination. Social campaign and short-term rules relaxation was thrown to encourage more enrollment from the two communities.

== Police Headquarters/Formation ==
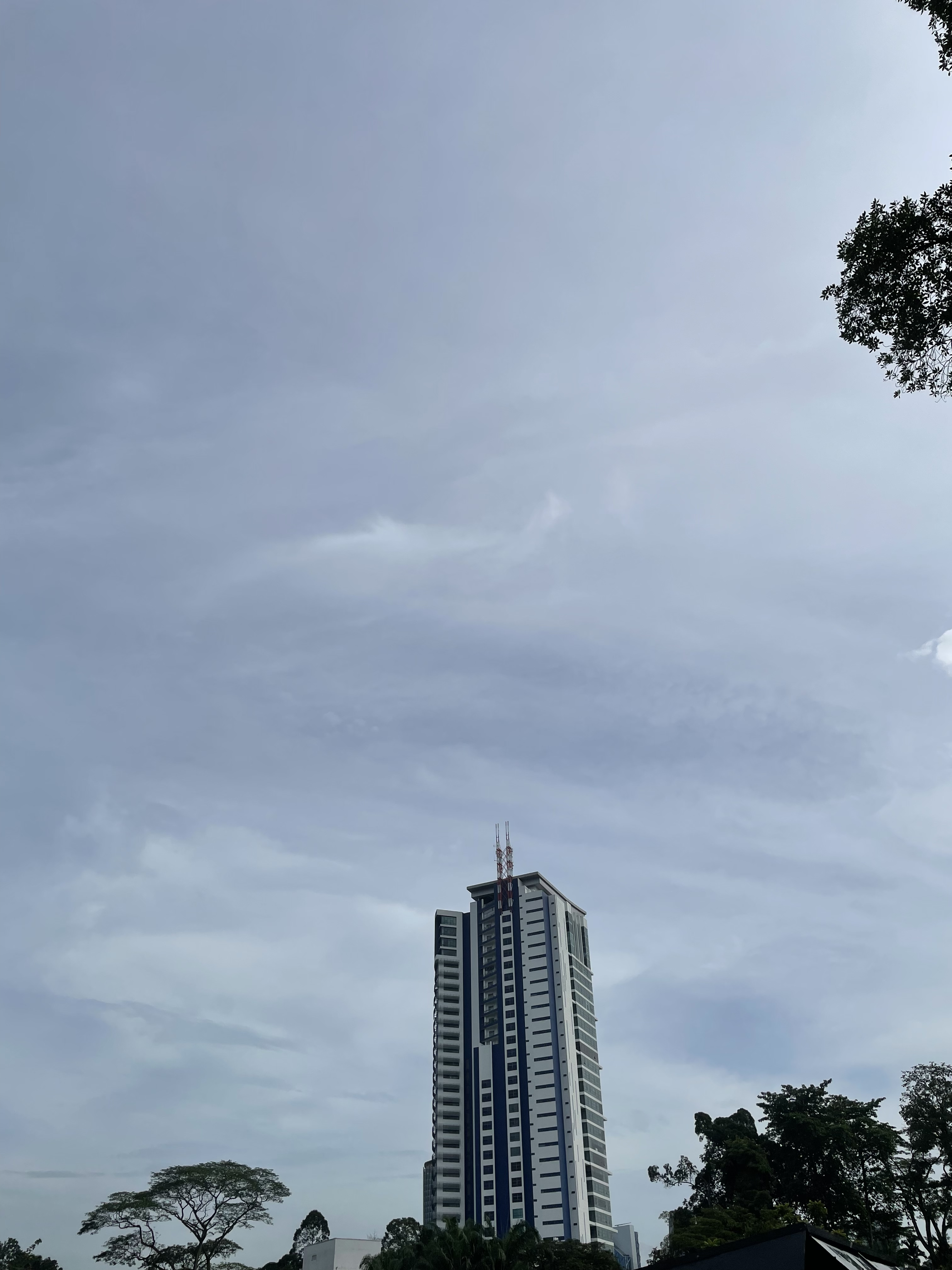
The Royal Malaysia Police headquarters at Bukit Aman in Kuala Lumpur

=== Police Contingent ===
1. Bukit Aman Royal Malaysia Police Headquarter, Kuala Lumpur 3.148725°N 101.691584°E
2. Johor Contingent Police Headquarters, Johor 1.477227°N 103.764673°E
3. Kedah Contingent Police Headquarters, Kedah
4. Kelantan Contingent Police Headquarters, Kelantan
5. Kuala Lumpur Contingent Police Headquarters, Kuala Lumpur 3.142093°N 101.707142°E
6. Melaka Contingent Police Headquarters, Melaka
7. Negeri Sembilan Contingent Police Headquarters, Negeri Sembilan
8. Pahang Contingent Police Headquarters, Pahang
9. Perak Contingent Police Headquarters, Perak
10. Perlis Contingent Police Headquarters, Perlis
11. Pulau Pinang Contingent Police Headquarters, Pulau Pinang
12. Sabah Contingent Police Headquarters, Sabah
13. Sarawak Contingent Police Headquarters, Sarawak
14. Selangor Contingent Police Headquarters, Selangor
15. Terengganu Contingent Police Headquarters, Terengganu

=== General Operation Force (GOF) ===
1. Northern Region GOF Base
2. Centre Region GOF Base
3. South East Region GOF Base
4. Sabah Region GOF Base
5. Sarawak Region GOF Base

=== Special Police Force ===
1. 69 Commando Police Base
2. Special Action Unit Police Base

=== Federal Reserve Unit (Anti Riot Police Force) ===
1. 1st Federal Reserve Unit Base
2. 2nd Federal Reserve Unit Base
3. 3rd Federal Reserve Unit Base
4. 4th Federal Reserve Unit Base
5. 5th Federal Reserve Unit Base
6. 6th Federal Reserve Unit Base
7. 7th Federal Reserve Unit Base
8. Women Federal Reserve Unit Base
9. Horseman Federal Reserve Unit Base

=== Marine Operation Force ===
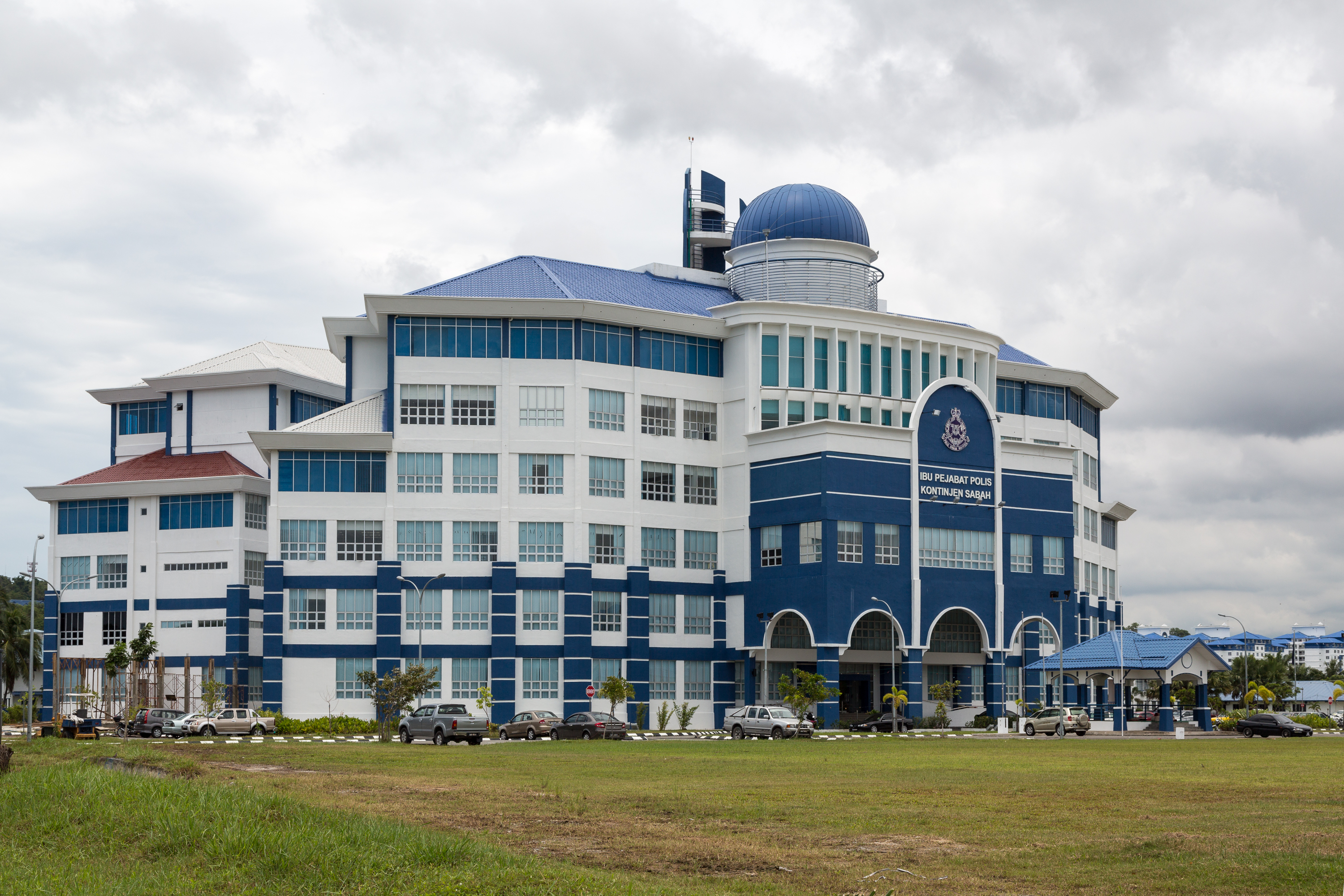
The Sabah Police Headquarters building in Kota Kinabalu

1. Northern Region water Police Base, Batu Uban, Pulau Pinang
2. East Region Marine Police Base, Kuantan, Pahang
3. Southern Region Marine Police Base, Johor Bahru, Johor
4. Sabah Region Marine Police Base, Sandakan, Sabah
5. Sarawak Region Marine Police Base, Kuching, Sarawak
6. Putrajaya Marine Police Base, Putrajaya

=== Air Operation Force ===
1. Peninsular Malaysia Region Air Police Base
2. Sabah Region Air Police Base
3. Sarawak Region Air Police Base

== Police uniform and equipment ==
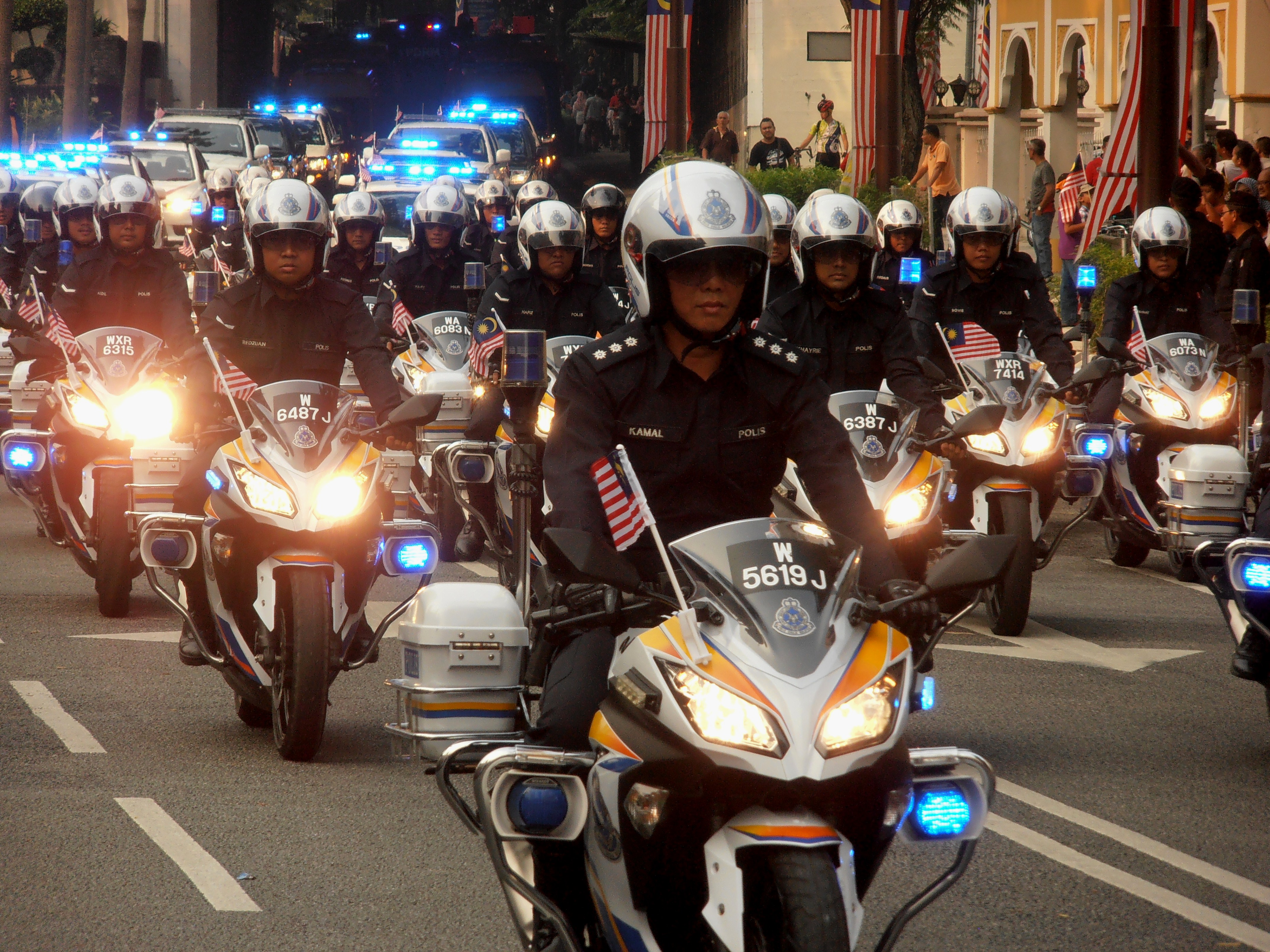
Motorcycle Patrol Unit (URB) during Merdeka Parade

Prior to 1994, police officer was worn light blue uniform and worn along khaki/brown pants. On 17 January 1994, the new police uniform was introduced, dark navy blue long/short sleeve shirts are worn along with dark navy blue cargo pants.

A personal name tag is worn on the right side together with the police shield above it while the word "Polis" ("police" in Malay) is emblazoned in the other side. A police service number is under the name tag and a rank insignia on the right arm.

The Sam Browne belt was replaced by the brand new ballistic nylon police duty belt equipped with a standard issue Walther P99 or Px4 Storm handgun, two extra 10 round magazines, a pair of Hiatt Speedcuffs, a T-baton, a pepper spray, an LED torch and a walkie-talkie. Sometimes they are equipped with a Heckler & Koch MP5 sub-machine-gun during special situations.

Traffic officers wears white helmet or dark navy blue cap while on duty, a white long sleeve shirt with a reflective yellow vest, black riding pants with a yellow stripe and riding boots. Their equipment is the same as constables except that they have a whistle in their left pocket.

== Firearms ==
M4 Carbine; replacing M16 rifles, the future standard issue rifles supplied by local company SME Ordnance

Royal Malaysia Police has acquired new submachine guns from CZ Company, a company in the Czech Republic. The New CZ Scorpion EVO 3 A1 9mm caliber is the latest generation Scorpion Sub Machine gun as part of a new market from Eastern Europe, and it will replace the existing MP5.

== Vehicles ==
In early June, the Royal Malaysian Police (PDRM) began taking delivery of the first of its 425 new Honda Civic 1.8 S patrol cars which are equipped with RMPNeT communication equipment, dashboard cameras and digital video recorders, in order to replace Proton Wira and Proton Waja police cars in stages and will take on patrol and enforcement duties. The force is also set to add another 850 vehicles, consisting of 653 Civic 1.8s sedans and 197 units of Proton X70 SUVs, bringing the total replacement of the vehicles to 1,275 units to completely modernise its patrol vehicle fleet.

== Controversy ==
Police misconduct within the RMP has been highlighted as a problem. Issues of police brutality, police corruption, and enforced disappearances have been linked to inadequate oversight. Several notorious cases of suspected extrajudicial killing by members of the police include the Murder of Shaariibuugiin Altantuyaa and the death in custody of Malaysian Indians such as A. Ganapathy.

=== Abduction of Pastor Raymond Koh and Amri Che Mat ===
In 2019, a national inquiry held by the Human Rights Commission of Malaysia's (SUHAKAM) concluded that agents of the Special Branch, Bukit Aman, were responsible for the abduction of Amri Che Mat in 2016 and Raymond Koh in 2017. In 2025, a high court found the Malaysian state and the Royal Malaysia Police responsible for Koh's forced disappearance and ordered them to pay at least 31 million ringgit ($7.4 million) in damages following a lawsuit filed by Koh's wife. The ruling was the first of its kind in Malaysian history.

=== Troll farm ===
In 2022, Meta Platforms reported that the Royal Malaysia Police was operating a troll farm, which was denied by the RMP.

== Major cases and incidents ==
=== Lahad Datu standoff ===
Following the Sulu militants intrusion, a military standoff commenced on 11 February 2013 and ended after conflict about 24 March 2013. 235 militants, most of whom were armed, arrived by boat in Lahad Datu district from Philippines territory and occupied the village of Tanduo. They were sent by Jamalul Kiram III, a claimant to the throne of the Sultanate of Sulu. His stated goal was to assert the Philippine territorial claim to eastern Sabah as part of the North Borneo dispute. In response, Malaysian security forces surrounded the village. Attempts by the Malaysian and the Philippine governments to reach a peaceful solution with Kiram's supporters were unsuccessful and the standoff escalated into an armed conflict on 1 March 2013. At the end of the standoff, around 56 militants were killed along with six civilians and 10 Malaysian security forces (of which eight were Malaysian police members). The rest of the militants were either captured or escaped back to the Philippines.

=== Murder of Aminulrasyid Amzah ===
A schoolboy, Aminulrasyid Amzah, was shot dead by police after allegedly trying to escape from a car accident which he was involved in. Aminulrasyid was driving his sister's car without a valid driver's licence after midnight on 3 May 2010, together with his friend, Azamuddin, who was the passenger. He had been trying to flee a number of motorcyclists who were chasing both boys after their vehicle had sideswiped a car earlier that night.

After Aminulrasyid was shot, his friend Azamuddin was assaulted and beaten by the police but managed to escape. The IGP and the RMP had alleged that Aminulrasyid was trying to ram a police roadblock as well as carrying a weapon in the car. Azamuddin and Aminulrasyid's family has refuted many of the police claims. Many members of the public and the opposing politicians have criticised the police's response, alluding to the fact that the police are trying to cover up the incident and fabricate evidence. The boy's family has rejected calls for an inquest into the shooting because they did not believe they would receive a fair and transparent investigation, especially from the police. Instead, they have called on the government to establish a royal commission of inquiry to investigate Aminulrasyid's death. A special eight-member panel has been formed to scrutinise the investigation of the shooting; however, opposing politicians and the boy's family have derided the formation of the panel as a publicity stunt by the government. On 24 March 2016, the High Court in Selangor awarded more than MYR400,000 in damages to the family of the victim to "alleviate their pain and suffering".

=== Recapture of Mas Selamat Kastari ===
Mas Selamat Kastari, who had escaped detention in Singapore in 2008, was captured by Bukit Aman and Johore Police while he was asleep in a secluded village house in Skudai, 25 kilometres (16 mi) northwest of Johor Bahru, Johore. He found a traditional kampung house on stilts in Kampung Tawakal, a tiny village with a population of less than 100. Located about 10 km away from the North-South Expressway near the Kempas exit, it is almost impossible to locate for those not familiar with the area. At 6:00am, about 30 armed policemen surrounded the kampung house and ordered Mas Selamat to come out. Police broke through two doors and rushed in when he refused to surrender. He was arrested together with two others, Abdul Matin and Johar Hassan, by PGK and Special Branch force following intelligence sharing with the police forces of Indonesia and Singapore. Police also seized documents and other paraphernalia that allegedly revealed their planned operation. This report was later confirmed by both the Singapore and Malaysian governments, with the date of capture given as 1 April 2009.

The Minister of Home Affairs (Malaysia) of Malaysia, Dato' Seri Hishammuddin Hussein, and Inspector-General of Police Tan Sri Musa Hassan at Putrajaya confirmed Mas Selamat was arrested and detained under the Internal Security Act. Hishammuddin declined to give details since the case is sensitive as it involves intelligence agencies of Singapore and Indonesia, as well as Malaysia. Musa said the arrest was made possible as police in Singapore, Indonesia and Malaysia had been sharing intelligence reports over the past year. It is learnt that Special Branch officers had been working on various leads since March and upon confirming his whereabouts planned the dawn raid that resulted in his arrest.

=== Arrest of Nur Misuari ===
Nur Misuari, the main leader and founder of one of a breakaway faction in the Philippines was arrested on 23 November 2001, together with six of his followers in Jampiras Island off Sabah after intruding past the Malaysian border illegally. Misuari is wanted in the Philippines for leading a failed rebellion against the Philippine government, which he was later extradited to the Philippine authorities in December 2001 to face legal action in his country, although Malaysia and the Philippines have no extradition treaty.

=== Al-Mau'nah arms heist ===
In the early morning on 2 July 2000, 21 individuals, part of the militia group Al-Mau'nah, visited the outpost and camp of Bn 304 Rejimen Askar Wataniah under the guise of a surprise inspection, seizing weapons including 97 M16 assault rifles, four GPMGs, five grenade launchers, 9,095 rounds of 5.56 mm and 60 rounds of 40 mm ammunition. The group was later cornered in the village of Sauk, Perak and involved in a stand-off with the Malaysian Army and Royal Malaysian Police forces. The Malaysian Special Forces threw a containment cordon around Bukit Jenalik. Tpr Matthew anak Medan from 21 Commando was murdered by one of the militants and was awarded Pahlawan Gagah Berani. The leader and militant group surrendered to the Malaysian Special Forces and later they were handed over to the police.

The Al-Mau'nah group later surrendered, and the leaders were brought to trial for "waging war upon the King". Mohamed Amin Mohamed Razali and his group were brought to trial for charges of "waging war against the King" and became the first group of people convicted of such charges in Malaysia. Mohamed Amin Mohamed Razali, alongside other militiamen Zahit Muslim and Jamaluddin Darus, were sentenced to death. Sixteen others were given life sentences. Police Detective Corporal Sanghadevan was murdered during the incident. Assistant Superintendent Police Abdul Razak Mohd. Yusof was awarded the Seri Pahlawan Gagah Perkasa for his role in resolving the stand-off.

=== Memali incident ===
The Memali Incident occurred in the remote village of Memali, Baling in the state of Kedah on 19 November 1985. A task force of 200 policemen under orders from the Acting Prime Minister and Home Minister Musa Hitam, laid siege to kampung (village) houses in Memali. The houses were occupied by an Islamic sect of about 400 people led by Ibrahim Mahmud a.k.a. Ibrahim Libya, a member of the Malaysian Islamic Party (PAS).

=== Bukit Kepong Incident ===
The Bukit Kepong Incident was an armed encounter which took place on 23 February 1950 between the police and the Malayan Communists during pre-independence Malaya. The first incident in the RMP history, this conflict took place in an area surrounding the Bukit Kepong police station in Bukit Kepong, a wooden station located on the banks of the Muar River, about 59 km from Muar town, Johor.

== In Malaysian popular culture ==
=== Books ===
- Malaya's Secret Police 1945–60: The Role of the Special Branch in the Malayan Emergency, 2008—the history of Malaysian Special Branch, written by former Special Branch officer, and a widely acknowledged expert on counter-insurgency, Leon Comber.
- The Struggle For Malaysian Independence, 2007—the history of the Malaysian police force, written by former senior police officer Dato' Seri J.J. Raj.
- Polis Wanita Sejarah Bergambar 1955–2007, 2007 – the history of Malaysian policewomen, written by Chief Inspector Selamat Bin Sainayune.
- Smashing Terrorism in the Malayan Emergency: The Vital Contribution of the Police, 2004 – Written by Brian Stewart, a former officer of Malayan Civil Service (MCS).
- Inspektor Junid Di Medan Jenayah, 1987 – A detective and mystery story written by Jalil Abd. Rahman, and produced by Fajar Bakti
- "Death Waits in the Dark" – Greenwood Press, 2001
- The Jungle Beat – Fighting Terrorists in Malaya – the history of Malayan police during fighting against communism, written by former Federation of Malay State Police officers, Roy Follows.

=== Television ===
- Debu-Debu Kota (City Dust) – Malay drama created and produced by Dato' Yusof Haslam
- Skuad Khas (Special Squad) – Malay drama created and produced by Dato' Yusof Haslam
- Gerak Khas – Malay drama created and produced by Dato' Yusof Haslam
- Roda-Roda Kuala Lumpur (1998, 2008–2013) (Wheels of Kuala Lumpur) – Malay drama created and produced by Dato' Yusof Haslam
- CID 3278 (2006–2007) – Malay drama produced by Rosyam Nor.
- Tragedi (Tragedy) – Malay drama broadcast on TV3
- VAT 69 - Warisan Darah Perwira – Malay documentary created by Jins Shamsuddin. Featured on ASTRO RIA.
- Metro Skuad (2012–2013) – Malay drama created and produced by Dato' Yusof Haslam
- Pasukan Gerakan Marin (2010/2011) – Marine Police Force drama starring Ashraf Muslim, Linda Hashim (S1 and S2), Sharnaaz Ahmad and Mardiana Alwi
- Kerambit (2016) – Crime drama starring Eman Manan and Zul Huzaimy on TV2
- Undercover (2010) – Chinese drama featured in NTV7 starring Adrian Tan
- Strike Back: Revolution (2017)– British-American action television series starring Daniel MacPherson, Warren Brown, Alin Sumarwata and Faizal Hussein.
- Gerak Khas Undercover (2021) – Malay drama created and produced by Dato' Yusof Haslam
- Polis Peronda Ranjau Jalanan (2024) - Malay drama created and produced by Dato Yusof Haslam while directed by Syafiq Yusof and C.Kumaresan.

=== Films ===
- Bukit Kepong – Malay film starring Jins Shamsuddin
- Bayangan Maut – Malay film starring Dato' Yusof Haslam and Noorkumalasari
- Police Story 3 – Hong Kong Cantonese film starring Jackie Chan.
- Ops Landau - Malay action TV film (telemovie) starring Eman Manan, Ramasundram, Elly Mazlein and Corrie 'Adam' Lee
- Don - The Chase Begins Again – Bollywood film starring Shah Rukh Khan and Shaharudin Thamby (Malaysian actors)
- The Viral Factor – Hong Kong action thriller films stars Jay Chou and Nicholas Tse
- Polis Evo – Malay action film starring Shaheizy Sam and Zizan Razak
- Kabali – Tamil film starring Rajinikanth
- Billa - Tamil film starring Ajith Kumar
- J Revolusi – Malay film starring Zul Ariffin and Izara Aishah Hisham
- Sindiket – Malay film starring Sharnaaz Ahmad, Daphne Iking and Dato Jalaluddin Hassan
- KL Special Force – Malay film starring Dato' Rosyam Nor and Fattah Amin
- One Two Jaga – Malay film starring Zahiril Adzim and Rosdeen Suboh
- Polis Evo 2 - Malay action film starring Shaheizy Sam and Zizan Razak
- Polis Evo 3 - Malay action film starring Shaheizy Sam and Zizan Razak
- War On Terror: KL Anarchy - Malay action war film starring Aedy Ashraf and Farali Khan
- Sheriff: Narko Integriti – Malay mystery action crime thriller film starring Zul Ariffin and Syafiq Kyle
- Takluk: Lahad Datu - Malay semi-biopic action film starring by Syafiq Kyle dan Kamal Adli inspired by the 2013 Lahad Datu standoff

=== Documentaries ===
- 999, a spin-off of Cops, premiered in 2002.
- OPS Maritim (OPS Maritime), about Marine Police operations and other matters.
- KL Enforcers, a reality series about The Malaysian Maritime Enforcement Agency and the Royal Malaysian Police (mainly the forensics team) carrying out their work. The first episode date was on 13 September 2014.

=== VCD/DVD ===
- Jungle Green Khaki Brown – A TV3 and Nickelodeon Books co-produced DVD documentary chronicling exclusive and historical footage from the archives of the British Malayan Library in United Kingdom and the Filem Negara Malaysia in conjunction of the 50th anniversary of Malaysia's Independence Day in 2007.

== See also ==
- Malaysian Armed Forces
- Malaysian Maritime Enforcement Agency
- Royal Malaysian Customs Department
- Malaysian Anti-Corruption Commission
- Elite Forces of Malaysia
- Singapore Police Force
- Volunteer Smartphone Patrol
- List of Malaysian police officers killed in the line of duty
