= Police Act 1967 =

Parliament of Malaysia
- Long title: An Act relating to the organization, discipline, powers and duties of the Royal Malaysia Police and matters incidental thereto.
- Citation: Act 344
- Territorial extent: Throughout Malaysia
- Passed by: Dewan Rakyat
- Passed: 23 August 1967
- Enacted: 1967 (Act No. 41 of 1967); Revised: 1988 (Act 344 w.e.f. 6 October 1988)
- Passed by: Dewan Negara
- Passed: 28 August 1967
- Effective: Throughout Malaysia–29 August 1967, P.U. 385A/1967; Federal Territory of Labuan–16 April 1984, P.U. (A) 197/1985

Legislative history

Initiating chamber: Dewan Rakyat
- Bill title: Police Bill 1967
- Introduced by: Michael Chen Wing Sum, Parliamentary Secretary to the Deputy Prime Minister
- First reading: 21 August 1967
- Second reading: 23 August 1967
- Third reading: 23 August 1967

Revising chamber: Dewan Negara
- Bill title: Police Bill 1967
- Member(s) in charge: Abdul Hamid Khan, Minister of Welfare Services
- First reading: 28 August 1967
- Second reading: 28 August 1967
- Third reading: 28 August 1967

Repeals
- Police Ordinance [F.M. 14 of 1952] Constabulary Ordinance [Sarawak Cap. 22] Police Force Ordinance [Sabah Cap. 101] Royal Malaysia Police Act 1963 [Act 30 of 1963] Royal Malaysia Police (Amendment) Act 1966 [Act 69 of 1966]

Amended by
- Police (Amendment) Act 1971 [Act A45] Malaysian Currency (Ringgit) Act 1975 [Act 160] Police (Amendment) Act 1976 [Act A347] Constitution (Amendment) Act 1976 [Act A354] Constitution (Amendment) Act 1981 [Act A514] Police (Amendment) Act 1981 [Act A516] Police (Amendment) Act 1987 [Act A685] Police (Amendment) Act 2012 [Act A1421] Police (Amendment) Act 2015 [Act A1495] Police (Amendment) Act 2024 [Act A1705]

Keywords
- Royal Malaysia Police, Police Volunteer Reserve Corp, Auxiliary Police
- Status: In force

The Police Act 1967 (Malay: Akta Polis 1967) is the Act of Parliament governing which governs the constitution, control, employment, recruitment, funds, discipline, duties, and powers of the Royal Malaysia Police including Royal Malaysia Police Reserve and the Royal Malaysia Police Cadet Corps. It was first enacted in 1967 (Act 41 of 1967) and then revised in 1988 as Act 344 of 1988. To date, there have been several attempts of amendments for the Police Act to be more in line with the internationally accepted human rights practices.

== History ==
In June 2008, there was an attempt to amend the Section 27 which did not specify the criteria and guideline to the conditions needed for permits to hold public rallies to reflect international standards. The attempted amendment was in line with proposals by the Royal Commission to Enhance the Management and Operation of the Royal Malaysia Police. Home Minister Syed Hamid Syed Jaafar Albar said the ministry agreed that applications for public rally permits must be made nine days before the date of the event and that the decision be made in three days.

The Police Act has been a subject of argument as it, to certain extent, inhibits the freedom of assembly. Its allowance for the police to detain without warrant has been a constant watch by international human rights organisations. In the discussion of human rights, especially the freedom of assembly, the Police Act is often cited together with other acts such as Internal Security Act, Official Secrets Act and Public Order (Preservation) Ordinance (1958) of which some allow police detention without warrant.

== Police duties ==
It specifies the scope of the duties of the Royal Malaysia Police. In the Section 3 (3) of Police Act 1967 stipulates that the duties of the Royal Malaysia Police personnel are as follows:

1. Apprehending all persons whom he is by law authorised to apprehend;
2. Processing security intelligence;
3. Conducting prosecutions;
4. Giving assistance in the carrying out of any law relating to revenue, excise, sanitation, quarantine, immigration and registration;
5. Giving assistance in the preservation of order in the ports, harbours and airports of Malaysia, and in enforcing maritime and port regulations;
6. Executing summonses, subpoenas, warrants, commitments and other process lawfully issued by any competent authority;
7. Exhibiting information;
8. Protecting unclaimed and lost property and finding the owners thereof;
9. Seizing stray animals and placing them in a public pound;
10. Giving assistance in the protection of life and property;
11. Protecting public property from loss or injury;
12. Attending the criminal courts and, if specially ordered, the civil courts, and keeping order therein; and
13. Escorting and guarding prisoners and other persons in the custody of the police.

== Structure ==
The Police Act 1967, in its current form (24 August 2015), consists of 14 Parts containing 100 sections and 3 schedules (including 9 amendments).

- Part I: Preliminary
- Part II: Interpretation
- Part III: The Royal Malaysia Police
- Part IV: Extra Police Officers and Watch Constables
- Part V: Service outside Malaysia and Service of Police of Other Territories in Malaysia
- Part VI: Appointments, Service, etc.
- Part VII: Duties and Powers of Police Officers
- Part VIII: Royal Malaysia Police Volunteer Reserve
- Part IX: Auxiliary Police
- Part X: Royal Malaysia Police Reserve
- Part XI: Royal Malaysia Police Cadet Corps
- Part XII: Discipline
- Part XIII: Police Fund
- Part XIV: General
- Schedules

== See also ==
- Police Act
