= Police Doggy =

Studio album by Parliament-Funkadelic/P-Funk All-Stars
- Released: February 10th, 1995
- Recorded: 1994
- Genre: Funk, funk rock, hip hop
- Label: P-Vine
- Producer: George Clinton

Parliament-Funkadelic/P-Funk All-Stars chronology
Dope Dogs (1994)	Police Doggy (1995)	T.A.P.O.A.F.O.M. (1996)

Police Doggy is an EP release by Parliament-Funkadelic/P-Funk All-Stars. The EP was released on February 10, 1995 by P-Vine Records. The EP also features a collaboration with the Scottish rock group Primal Scream. Police Doggy has never been released outside Japan. Conceptually, Police Doggy continues the theme that originated on the P-Funk All-Stars album Dope Dogs.

== Track listing ==
1. "Police Doggy" 3:45
2. "Lost Dog Mix - 1" 9:49
3. "Lost Dog Mix - 2" 8:28
4. "Pepe (The Pill Popper)" 6:08

== Personnel ==
Police Doggy

- Vocals: George Clinton, Derrick "Frog" Rossen
- Musicians: Dewayne "Blackbyrd" McKnight, Joseph "Amp" Fiddler, Michael Hampton

Lost Dog

- Performed by George Clinton and Primal Scream
- Vocals: George Clinton, Bobby Gillespie, Denise Johnson, Belita Woods,

Jerome Rodgers, Charlie Wilson, Louie Kabbabie

- Musicians: Bobby Gillespie, Robert Young, Andrew Innes, Dennis White,

Henry Olsen, Steve (from Primal Scream), Martin Duffy

Pepe (The Pill Popper)

- Performed by Patavian Lewis
- Vocals: Patavian Lewis, Trafael Lewis, Kevin Johnson, George Clinton,

Louie Kabbabie, Belita Woods

- Musicians: Michael Hampton, Charlie Wilson, Michael "Clip" Payne,

Joseph "Amp" Fiddler, Dewayne "Blackbyrd" McKnight, Muruga Booker, Perry Robinson, Cyrus Niccore
