= Royal Malaysia Police K9 Unit =

Police dog unit in Malaysia

K9 Detection Unit
- Unit Pengesan K9
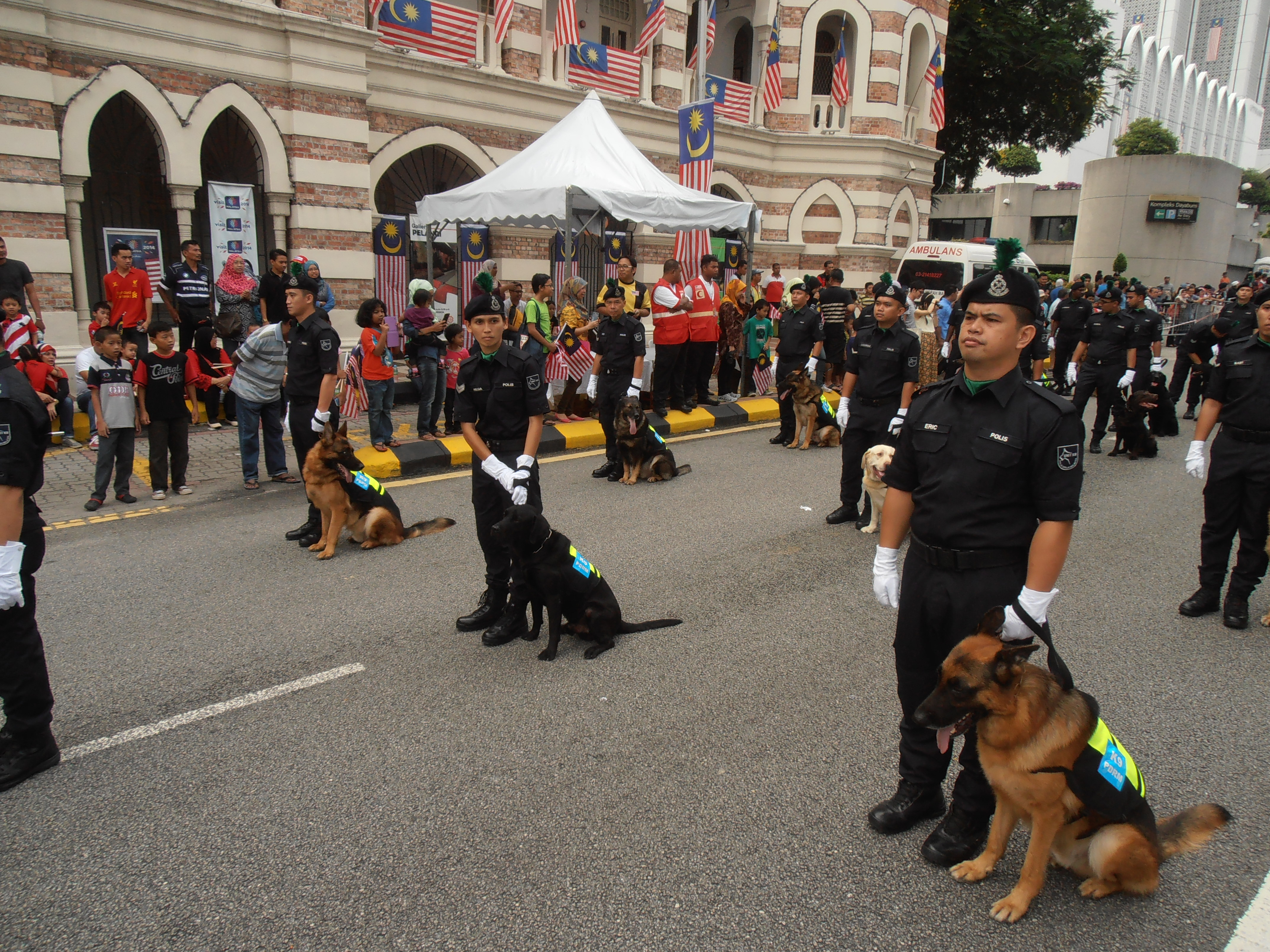
- RMP's K9 Unit in 2014
- Active: June 1968; 58 years ago
- Country: Malaysia
- Branch: Royal Malaysia Police
- Type: Police dog
- Role: Suspect apprehension; Search and rescue; Narcotic detection; Cadaver recovery; Explosive and firearm detection; Electronic storage device detection
- Size: 68 dogs (2025); 155 handlers (2020)
- Part of: Criminal Investigation Department (CID); D6 - Technical Assistance Division
- Garrison/HQ: PULAPOL, Kuala Lumpur

Commanders
- K9 Unit Chief: Saravanan Munusamy

Royal Malaysia Police K9 Unit is a police dog unit in Malaysia. It is placed under the Technical Assistance Division (D6) of the Criminal Investigation Department (CID) in Royal Malaysia Police. Its headquarters and training centre is located at PULAPOL in Kuala Lumpur. Dogs under the unit are trained for crime prevention, suspect apprehension, bomb detection, narcotic search, missing person search, cadaver recovery and electronic device detection.

== History and background ==
The history of police dogs in the force began in 1957 with three Labradors, which served as trekker dogs for the Police Field Force (now known as General Operations Force). In 1959, 10 police officers volunteered to serve as dog handlers. In 1961, RMP was given government fundings to acquire six dogs from the Commonwealth Forces in United Kingdom and a K9 troop with the name "Detection Dog Unit" was formally established in 1962. (Note: However, The Straits Times in January 1966 reported that a police dog unit established during the Malayan Emergency was abolished in 1962.)

In August 1964, the Home Ministry approved the establishment of the K9 unit under D6 as "Detection Unit", for which RM56,000 was spent to establish the unit, which would comprise six German Shepherd dogs. Inspector A.P. Raja, the founder of the unit, was sent to the London Metropolitan Police in July 1966 for a 6-months long dog-handling course after the 1964 decision. (Note: The Straits Times in July 1966 instead reported that Inspector Raja will only undergo 4-months training in the UK.)

Inspector Raja came back with one German Shepherd dog named "Tex" from the UK in March 1967, while the other five did not arrive until December 1967 due to delay in delivery. Upon the arrival of the five remaining dogs, they were then named as "Prince", "Sam", "Rex", "Black Jack" and "Foxie" by Inspector Raja. Later, the dogs' names were renamed according to local fruits in Malaysia, with Tex being renamed as "Jambu", while the five other dogs were renamed as "Manggis", "Pulasan", "Chiku", "Duku" and "Langsat".

The six dogs then undergone further 6-months (Note: Some contemporary news reports claimed it was 4-months long.) training with their assigned handlers at PULAPOL. The unit become operational in June 1968 and the K9 dogs were known as "General Purpose Dogs".

In early 1979, following the government's drive to combat drugs trafficking in the country, four police officer were sent to Front Royal, Virginia to attend a three-months course on how to train narcotics detection dogs. They returned with four Labradors, which were gifted by the US government. Later in July 1979, 24 German Shepherds and 3 Springer Spaniels were bought from the UK to form the narcotic detection division under the K9 unit.

In October 1989, another specialised division for explosives and firearms detection was formed under the K9 unit. It began with four dogs, which consists of Labrador, Springer Spaniel and Border Collie breeds from UK. In 1997, seven officers were sent to the US to attend the Explosives and Firearms Detection Dog's Handlers Course. In 1998, the US government again offered similar training course for seven Malaysian police officers and the ATF gifted 31 dogs to the unit. Since 1998 until 2007, RMP's K9 unit officers have been attending the K9 Explosive Detection Course organised by the US State Department under the Anti-Terrorism Assistance Program at Front Royal.

In November 2010, a new division for cadaver recovery was formed, which started out with six German Shepherds that were trained by experts from Police Dog Training Centre College of Finland. Dogs under this division were tasked to locate human bodies or body parts in crime scene, or missing persons who are presumed to be dead. The cadaver recovery division also collaborated with Universiti Putra Malaysia (UPM) to carry out an eight months long training at the university's Human Anatomy Department in April 2014.

In November 2018, a K9 Memorial was erected at PULAPOL to commemorate all present and past K9 dogs ever employed by the unit since its establishment in 1968. The names of all K9 dogs were inscribed on the memorial. In July 2022, following the passing of a narcotic detection dog named "Bad" in Pahang, it was announced that a K9 Memorial Park will be built at Alor Akar, Kuantan, on the site where Bad and Tho (another K9 dog that died in September 2020) were buried. However, it's unclear when it will be realised.

On 16 July 2025, the Home Ministry approved the first ever adoption programme for retired K9 dogs. The first K9 dog adopted under this programme is an eight years old German Shepherd named "Goran" on 4 September 2025, who was retired on 16 July 2024 after being diagnosed with hip problems by a UPM veterinarian.

In 2010, there were a total of 145 K9 dogs under the unit. Later in 2014, the number of K9 dogs nationwide decreased to 137. The following year, the number dropped slightly to 135 dogs. In 2016, the total number of K9 dogs further decreased to 128. In January 2020, the number of K9 dogs throughout the country was raised to 150. In January 2025 however, that number dropped to only 68 dogs.

== Training ==
Dogs under the unit are typically purchased from foreign countries such as UK or China under open tender. K9 dogs will be quarantined for a month upon arrival in Malaysia, before being sent to the K9 Unit's headquarters for a four months training course with their assigned handlers. Each dog will only be assigned one handler and will be trained according to their field of specialty. The K9 dogs will also be trained to follow the handlers' command in Malay.

After finishing their training, the K9 dogs and their handlers will then be deployed to other police contingents throughout the country. At every 6 to 12 months interval, the K9 dogs and their handlers will be recalled back to the headquarters to undergo retraining session.

== Retirement ==
K9 dogs under the unit may be retired upon reaching 8 years old, depending on their health conditions, and may be retired early at 6 or 7 years old if they were found by have chronic health issues by a veterinarian. Once K9 dogs reached 10 years old, they are typically retired by the police force due to their declining abilities.

Retired dogs will continue to stay under the care of their handlers at the K9 Unit. If there is any medical emergency, the dogs will be brought to the Universiti Putra Malaysia veterinary hospital for treatment, but may alternatively be sent to a private veterinary clinic if it occurs outside of office hours. Retired dogs under RMP will not be euthanised unless the dog in question is in a nearly vegetative state. Euthanasia is discouraged within the unit and is only done as a last resort.

Before 2025, retired K9 dogs are not allowed to be adopted due to "security reasons" and them being considered as government assets. On 16 July 2025 however, the Home Ministry approved the first ever adoption programme for retired police K9 dogs. Adoption priority are given to the K9's original handler first, then followed by other police officers, and finally qualifying members of the public who have gone through a stringent screening process. The first dog adopted under this programme is a German Shepherd dog called "Goran" in Kuala Muda on 4 August 2025, who was adopted by a police inspector from Perak.

== Notable involvement ==
- 29 July 1968 - Three police dogs, namely Pulasan, Manggis and Duku, were deployed to track down the missing body of 16-year-old boy K. Rajagopal, who were killed by a gang fight and later thrown into the Batu River near Jalan Ipoh. Pulasan in particular was praised for its ability to track down the blood trail within 3 minutes despite it have been intentionally covered with black oil.
- 4–13 August 2019 - Several police K9 dogs together with K9 dogs from the Fire and Rescue Department were sent to search for Nora Anne Quoirin, an Irish-French teen from UK who went missing in a jungle in Negeri Sembilan. However the K9 dogs did not managed to find the missing teen during the 10-days search and rescue operation.
- December 2022 - Six dogs from the K9 Unit were deployed to assist in the search and rescue effort in the 2022 Batang Kali landslide, with two dogs named "Leo" and "Reed" being featured in RMP's official Facebook page in appreciation for their hard work in the operation.
- 5–10 December 2023 - A K9 Unit dog named "Chief" was deployed to search for a 6 years old boy Zayn Rayyn at Apartment Idaman in Damansara Damai on the day he went missing, but yielded no result. Another dog named "Red" was deployed the next day, but still failed to locate the boy. After the body of Zayn was discovered, "Falco", "Jimmy" and "Ruby" were deployed to the area to search for evidence on 9 December, and were replaced by "Gucci" and "Ricks" the next day.
- 1–2 April 2025 - Police K9 Unit dogs were deployed to houses near the Putra Heights pipeline fire to detect whether there is any human body inside them.

== See also ==
- Police K-9 Unit (Singapore)
- Royal Malaysia Police
- Fire and Rescue Department of Malaysia K9 Unit
