= Zohadie Bardaie =

Malaysian academic

Yang Berbahagia Dato' Muhamad Zohadie Bardaie DSSA JMN

4th Vice-Chancellor of the Universiti Putra Malaysia
- In office 18 April 2001 – 31 December 2005
- Chancellor: Hamdan Sheikh Tahir; Sharafuddin of Selangor
- Preceded by: Syed Jalaludin Syed Salim
- Succeeded by: Nik Mustapha Raja Abdullah

Personal details
- Born: 29 December 1950 (age 75) Meru, Klang, Selangor
- Spouse: Umi Kalsum Hussein
- Education: University of California, Davis (BEng); University of California (MEng); Cornell University (PhD)

Muhamad Zohadie bin Bardaie is a Malaysian academic administrator. He was the fourth Vice-Chancellor of Universiti Putra Malaysia, serving from 18 April 2001 until 31 December 2005. Currently, he is one of the three Pro-Chancellors in UPM, the other two are Tengku Amir Shah and Peter Chin Fah Kui.

== Education background ==
After completing his secondary education in Klang High School, Zohadie finished Diploma in Agriculture from College of Agriculture Malaya in 1971. Then, he furthered his study in University of California, Davis, obtained his Bachelor's degree in 1974, and Master degree in 1975, both in field of engineering. In 1979, he completed Doctor of Philosophy (PhD) from Cornell University, focused in Agricultural Engineering.

== Career ==
Zohadie was a lecturer in Faculty of Engineering in UPM, he has been ranked as Associate Professor in 1982 and Professor in 1993. He held the post as Dean of the faculty from 1988 until 1993. After that, he served as Deputy Vice-Chancellor (Development and Financial) from August 1993 until July 1999. He was appointed as Vice Chancellor of UPM in 2001, and then resigned in 2005.

The reason he resigned from the office is due to conflict between himself and the Minister of Higher Education at that time, Shafie Salleh. Zohadie disagree on ministry's decision to transfer an academic programme (Aerospace Engineering) from UPM to UKM, and publicly satirising the minister with poetry. Although the programme retained by UPM at last, Zohadie resigned from the post few months later, and Shafie replaced by Mustapa Mohamed after the cabinet reshuffled in early 2006.

== Honours ==
=== Honours of Malaysia ===
- Malaysia :
  - Companion of the Order of the Defender of the Realm (JMN) (1999)
- Selangor :
  - Knight Companion of the Order of Sultan Salahuddin Abdul Aziz Shah (DSSA) – Dato' (1996)

=== Honorary degrees ===
- Malaysia
  - Emeritus Professor from Universiti Putra Malaysia (8 August 2009)

Academic offices
Preceded by Syed Jalaludin Syed Salim	Vice-Chancellor of the Universiti Putra Malaysia; 2001 – 2005	Succeeded by Nik Mustapha Raja Abdullah
