= Saari Sungib =

Malaysian politician

- شاعري سوڠيب

Member of the Selangor State Legislative Assembly for Hulu Kelang
- In office 8 March 2008 – 12 August 2023
- Preceded by: Ahmad Bujang (BN–UMNO)
- Succeeded by: Mohamed Azmin Ali (PN–BERSATU)
- Majority: 2,134 (2008); 2,881 (2013); 15,349 (2018)

Faction represented in Selangor State Legislative Assembly
- 2008–2015: Malaysian Islamic Party
- 2015–2018: National Trust Party
- 2018–2023: Pakatan Harapan

Personal details
- Born: Saari bin Sungib; 1957 (age 68–69) Dengkil, Selangor
- Citizenship: Malaysian
- Party: People's Justice Party (PKR) (1998–2004); Malaysian Islamic Party (PAS) (2004–2015); National Trust Party (AMANAH) (since 2015)
- Other political affiliations: Barisan Alternatif (BA) (1999–2004); Pakatan Rakyat (PR) (2008–2015); Pakatan Harapan (PH) (since 2015)
- Spouse: Aliza Jaafar
- Children: 7 (including Anfaal)
- Education: Sekolah Tuanku Abdul Rahman
- Alma mater: University of Aston; University of Hull; Universiti Kebangsaan Malaysia
- Occupation: Politician

Saari bin Sungib is a Malaysian politician who served as Member of the Selangor State Legislative Assembly (MLA) for Hulu Kelang from March 2008 to August 2023. He is a member, State Deputy Chairman of Selangor and Division Chief of Gombak of the National Trust Party (AMANAH), a component party of the Pakatan Harapan (PH) coalition and was a member of the Malaysian Islamic Party (PAS), a former component party of Pakatan Rakyat (PR) coalition as well as member of the People's Justice Party (PKR), a former component party of the Barisan Alternatif (BA) coalition. He is also the father of Anfaal Saari, the Member of the Selangor State Executive Council (EXCO), Taman Templer MLA and Deputy Women Chief of AMANAH.

== Political career ==
=== Candidate for the Member of Parliament (1999 & 2004) ===
In the 1999 general election, Saari made his electoral debut after being nominated by BA to contest for the Kuala Langat federal seat. He lost to Barisan Nasional (BN) candidate Shafie Salleh by a minority of 8,020 votes.

In the 2004 general election, Saari was renominated by BA to contest for the Paya Besar federal seat. He again lost to BN candidate Siti Zaharah Sulaiman by a minority of 12,518 votes.

=== Member of the Selangor State Legislative Assembly (2008–2023) ===
In the 2008 Selangor state election, Saari was nominated by PR to contest for the Hulu Kelang state seat. He won the seat and was elected to the Selangor State Legislative Assembly as the Hulu Kelang MLA for the first term after defeating defending MLA Ahmad Bujang of BN by a majority of 2,134 votes.

In the 2013 Selangor state election, Saari was renominated by PR to defend the Hulu Kelang seat. He defended the seat and was reelected to the assembly as the Hulu Kelang MLA for the second term after defeating Abdul Rahim Pandak Kamarudin of BN by a majority of 2,881 votes.

In the 2018 Selangor state election, Saari was nominated by PH to defend the Hulu Kelang seat. He again defended the seat and was reelected to the assembly as the Hulu Kelang MLA for the third term after defeating Ismail Ahmad of BN and Kamalulhysham Mohd Suhut of Gagasan Sejahtera (GS) by a majority of 12,518 votes.

Saari decided against being nominated in the 2023 Selangor state election to defend the Hulu Kelang seat again or contest for other seats due to his poor health. It was reported that his daughter, Member of the Ampang Jaya Municipal Council (MPAJ), Deputy Women Chief of AMANAH and Division Women Chief of AMANAH of Gombak Anfaal was on the list of candidates being considered by the AMANAH party leadership to be nominated to contest for the Hulu Kelang seat in the elections to replace Saari. However, the Hulu Kelang seat was subsequently contested by the Juwairiya Zulkifli of the People's Justice Party (PKR), another component party of the PH coalition and won by Azmin Ali of Perikatan Nasional (PN), thus ending their 37-year devotion to the government. Anfaal contested and won the Taman Templer state seat instead.

== Election results ==
Parliament of Malaysia
Year	Constituency	Candidate	Votes	Pct	Opponent(s)	Votes	Pct	Ballots cast	Majority	Turnout
1999	P101 Kuala Langat	Saari Sungib (keADILan)	16,858	40.39%	Shafie Salleh (UMNO)	24,878	59.61%	43,296	8,020	75.38%
2004	P084 Paya Besar	Saari Sungib (PKR)	7,956	27.98%	Siti Zaharah Sulaiman (UMNO)	20,474	72.02%	29,001	12,518	77.46%

Selangor State Legislative Assembly
Year	Constituency	Candidate	Votes	Pct	Opponent(s)	Votes	Pct	Ballots cast	Majority	Turnout
2008	N18 Hulu Kelang	Saari Sungib (PAS)	15,404	53.72%	Ahmad Bujang (UMNO)	13,270	46.28%	29,178	2,134	75.88%
2013	N18 Hulu Kelang	Saari Sungib (PAS)	21,310	53.62%	Abdul Rahim Pandak Kamarudin (UMNO)	18,429	46.38%	40,241	2,881	87.22%
2018	N18 Hulu Kelang	Saari Sungib (AMANAH)	25,746	58.89%	Ismail Ahmad (UMNO)	10,397	23.79%	44,209	15,349	85.89%
2018	N18 Hulu Kelang	Saari Sungib (AMANAH)	25,746	58.89%	Kamalulhysham Mohd Suhut (PAS)	7,573	17.32%	44,209	15,349	85.89%
