= Jalaluddin Hassan =

Malaysian actor and television host

Yang Berbahagia Dato' Jalaluddin Hassan DPTJ
- جلال الدين حسن
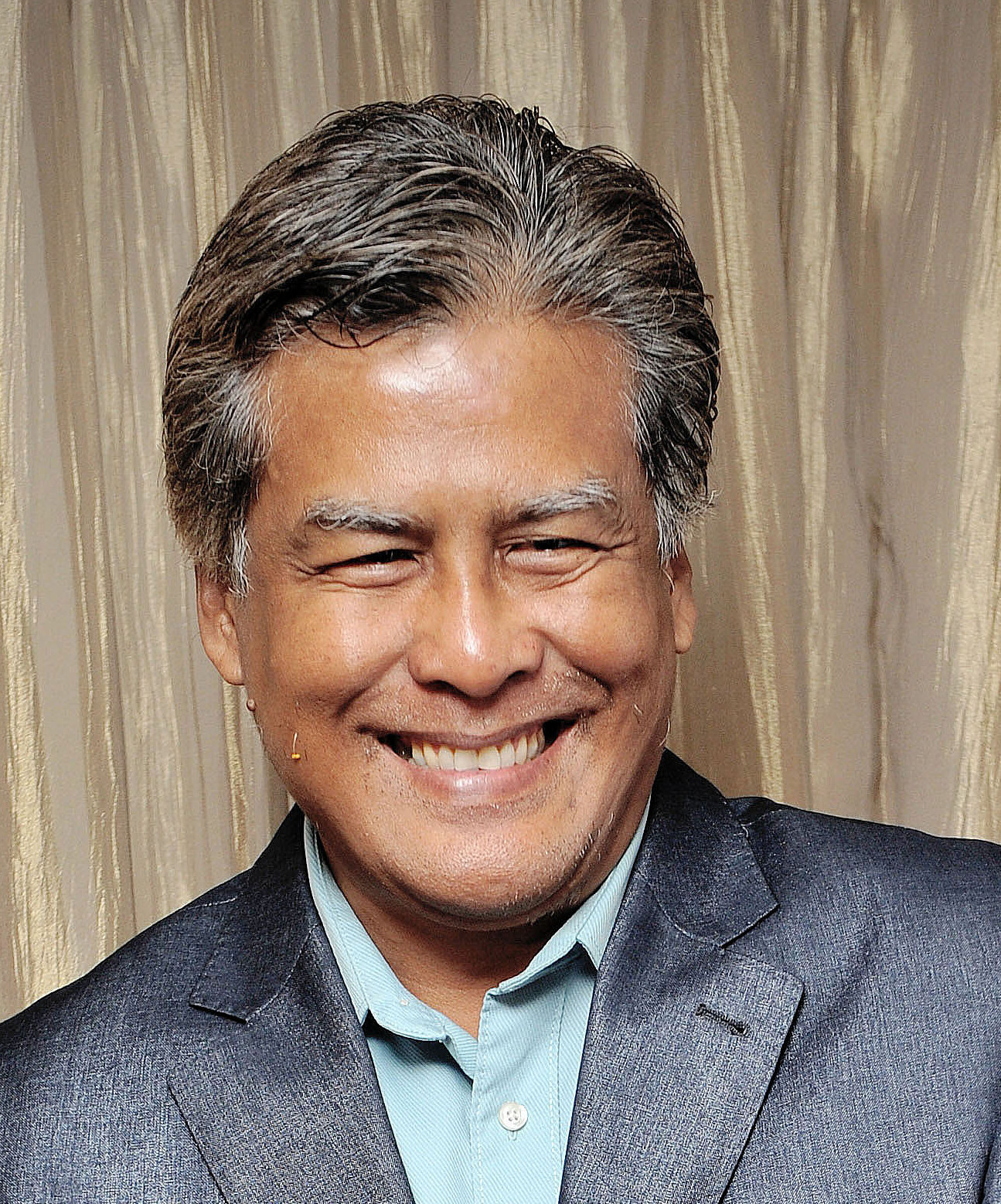
- Jalaluddin in 2012
- Born: Jalaluddin bin Hassan; 18 February 1954 (age 72); Setapak, Kuala Lumpur, (then in Selangor), Malaya (now Malaysia)
- Occupations: Actor, host
- Years active: 1984–present
- Spouses: Datin Hashimah Binti Haji Aksan (m. 1976; died 2016) Datin Rapidah Abdul Ghani (m. 2017)
- Children: 8
- Parent: Hassan Azhari (father))
- Relatives: Musa Hassan (brother); Fuad Hassan (brother)

Jalaluddin bin Hassan (born 18 February 1954) is a Malaysian actor and television host. He is famously known for being the host of the Malaysian version of Who Wants to Be a Millionaire? game show in Malay on NTV7 (2000–2002).

== Background ==
He is the third child of Hassan Azhari, a religious scholar who had a dedicated programme teaching the Qur'an on Radio Televisyen Malaysia (RTM) from 1960 to 2000. He is related to Musa Hassan, a former Inspector General of Police for the Royal Malaysia Police (RMP), and Fuad Hassan (1949–2014), a former assemblyman of Ulu Klang and Director General of the Special Affairs Department (JASA) in the Ministry of Information. He is a Malay of Banjar descent.

== Honours ==
=== Honour of Malaysia ===
- Negeri Sembilan
  - Knight Commander of the Grand Order of Tuanku Jaafar (DPTJ) – Dato' (2007)

He was awarded the Darjah Kebesaran Tuanku Jaafar (DPTJ) which carries the title Dato' by the Yang di-Pertuan Besar Negeri Sembilan, Tuanku Ja'afar in conjunction with his birthday in year 2007.

== Filmography ==
=== Film ===
Year	Title	Role	Notes
1994	Panggilan Pulau	Husin	Debut film appearances
1995	XX Ray II	Hang Tuah	
1995	Jimi Asmara	Engku Sulaiman	
1995	Awas	Prof. Rahman	
1995	Sayang Salmah	Jabar	
1995	Ringgit Kasorrga	Pak Teh	
1995	Johhny Bikin Filem	Mastar	
1996	Suratan Kasih	Natasha's Father	
1996	Cinta Metropolitan	Farouk	
1996	Merah	Kasih's Father	
1997	Baginda	Teacher Bakar	
1997	Gemilang	Mr. Razlan	
1998	Iman Alone	Dato' Kamal Ikram	
1998	Silat Lagenda	Lecturer (voice)	
1999	Nafas Cinta	Datuk Rahim	
2000	Mimpi Moon	Dr. Mansoor	
2000	Senario Lagi	Actress TV Series	
2000	Anaknya Sazali	Dr. Karim	
2001	Spinning Gasing	Himself	
2001	Putih	Bendahara Sri Wak Raja (voice)	
2002	Mendam Berahi	Datuk Azmi	
2002	Gerak Khas the Movie II	Raziman	
2003	Iskandar	Tan Sri Hisham Al-Bakri	
2003	Diari Romeo	Johan	
2003	Mr Cinderella 2	Dato' Penasihat	
2004	Father		
2004	Bicara Hati	Noraini's Father	
2005	Maaria		
2005	Pontianak Menjerit	Mr. Salleh (Lawyer)	
2006	Cicak Man	President Ramlan (President of Metrofulus)	
2007	Jangan Pandang Belakang	Daim	
2007	1957: Hati Malaya	The Sultan of Kedah	
2008	I'm Not Single	Borhan	
2008	Cinta U-Turn	Datuk Jamal	
2008	Akhirat	Uncle	
2008	Antoofighter: Amukan Drakulat!	Himself	
2008	Susuk	Producer Razman	
2008	Cicakman 2: Planet Hitam	President Ramlan (President of Metrofulus)	
2009	Sifu & Tongga	Director of Human Rights	
2009	Rasukan Ablasa	Ashraf's Father	
2009	Setem	Adnan Hassan	
2010	Andartu Terlampau... 21 Hari Mencari Suami?	Nik Mat	
2010	Magika	Murad	
2010	Aku Tak Bodoh	Teacher Anwar	
2011	Raya Tak Jadi!	Haji Ehsan	
2011	Apa Tengok Tengok?	Dad Ahmad Daniel	
2012	Hantu Gangster	Bang Nasir	
2012	Shh... Dia Datang	Mar	Completed
2013	Lemak Kampung Santan	Tan Sri Johari Al Bakri	
2013	Balada Pencinta	Aishah's Father	
2013	Cinderella	Datuk Mokhtar	
2014	Aku Akan Muncul		
2014	Bahaya Cinta	Iskandar's Father	
2014	CEO	Tan Sri	
2015	Darah Panas	Syahana's Father	
2015	Biasan		
2016	Langit Cinta	Datuk Affendi	
2016	Lu Mafia Gua Gangster	King	
2016	Temuan Takdir	ACP Hamdan	
2016	Desolasi	Aiman's Father	
2017	Sindiket	Tuan Hassan	
2017	I'm Not A Terrorist	Dayana's Father	
2018	Pulang	Omar (50an)	
2018	Rise: Ini Kalilah	Man on the plane	
2018	3: AM	Father	
2019	XX Ray III	Hang Tuah	
2019	Hero: Jangan Bikin Panas	Master Samiri	
2020	Daulat	Malik	
2020	Town Mall	Tok Megat	
2021	Kerana Korona	Leman	
2021	Penunggang Agama	Dato' Hafsyam	
2021	Sa Balik Baju	Prof.	
2022	Jeritan Jin	Jaafar	
2022	Gila Gusti	Tiger Rajah	
2022	Mistik 3 Logi Puaka		
2022	Mat Kilau	Haji Muhammad	
2022	Bintang Hatiku		
2022	Juang	Supt Ibrahim	
2022	Tilam Perca	Pak Man	
2023	Escape	Mejar Dzulkarnain	
2023	Eva ‘Take Me As I Am’	The Judge	
2023	Imam	YDP Majlis Agama	
2023	Sumpahan Syaitan	Branco	
2023	Syaitan Munafik		
2024	Jiwa 8 Belas	Atok Li	
2025	Harimau Merah: Konflik Bermula		

=== Television series ===
Year	Title	Role	TV channel	Notes
1984	Santan Berlada		TV1	2 episode
1989	Kebangkitan		TV1	
1990	Kelompak Bunga Putih		TV1	
1991	Layar Mutiara		TV1	
1995	Hidayat	Hidayat	TV3	
1996	Meniti Pelangi		TV2	
1997	Antara Dendam dan Ehsan		TV3	
1998	City of the Rich		TV2	
1998	Idaman (Season 1)	Datuk Mansor	Astro Ria	
1999	Romeo & Juliet		TV3	
1999	Kembara Bermusim		TV1	
2000	Spanar Jaya	Himself	NTV7	Special appearance
2001–2008	Astana Idaman	Dato' Mansor	Astro Ria	
2003	Jejak Perantau		TV1	
2004	Mama Paparazzi		TV3	
2005	Rafflesia		TV2	
2006	Mya Zara	Tan Sri Affendi	TV3	Special appearance
2006	Rafflesia 2		TV2	
2007	Dinasti Bilut	Datuk Razwan	TV1	
2007	Datin Diaries		TV3	
2007	Emil Emilda	Tan Sri Baseera	TV3	Special appearance
2008	Akukah Tanggang	Datuk Hisham	TV3	
2009–2013	Roda-Roda Kuala Lumpur	Supt. Razif	TV2	
2009	Yusuff	Haji Yaakob	TV3	
2009	Nur Kasih	Haji Hassan	TV3	
2010	Janji Kekasih	Haji Safuan	TV3	
2010	Siong	Prof. Zahir	TV3	
2010	Bila Musang Berjanggut	Albab Al-Masyhur	TV3	
2011–2012	Makbul	Anuar	TV2	
2011	Gemilang	Talib	TV3	
2011	Cinta Elysa	Jazman	TV3	
2012	Mahabbah	Tan Sri Sabri	TV3	
2012	Tanah Kubur (Season 3)	Kefli	Astro Oasis	Episode: "Segulung Kain Kapan"
2012	Evolusi KL Drift The Series	Dato' Hashim	TV2	
2012	Metro Skuad (Season 2)	Malik	TV2	Episode: "Kemulut"
2013	Cinta Dan Wahyu		TV Alhijrah	Special appearance
2013	Diandra	Dato' Fikri	TV3	
2013	Duri Di Hati	Dato' Hamid	TV3	
2013	Janji Adam	Sir Zaidi	TV3	
2013	Terukir Di Bintang	Dato' Akhbar	TV3	
2013–2014	Super Game Boy	Masterminda	Astro Ceria	
2013–2014	Bukan Kerana Aku Tak Cinta	Tan Sri Idris	Astro Mustika HD	
2014	Masihkah Ada Cinta	Dato' Imran	TV3	
2014	Kifarah (Season 1)	Bomoh	TV3	Episode: "Duit"
2014	Kusinero Cinta		Astro Mustika HD	
2014	Setitis Kasih Darmia	Dato Roslan	TV9	
2014	Permainan Cinta		Hypp Sensasi HD	
2015	Tabir Zulaikha	Datuk Aziz	TV3	
2015	Ajaibnya Cinta	Datuk Shamsul	TV3	
2015	Tanah Kubur (Season 14)	Suffian	Astro Oasis	Episode: "Hamba Allah Atau Hamba Duit"
2015	Embun Belum Terbakar	Ku Azhar	TV2	
2015–2016	Tuan Anas Mikael	Tun Akhiruddin	Astro Ria	
2016	Kasih Di Wajahmu	Teacher Ishak	TV1	
2017	Isteri-Isteri Ayah	Abang Kamal	TV3	
2017–2018	Syurga Yang Kedua	Daud	Astro Prima	
2017–2018	Kekasih Paksa Rela	Dato' Azman	TV3	
2018	Nur	Datuk Ayah Haji Mukhsin	TV3	
2018	Cinta Koko Coklat	Tan Sri Farish	NTV7	
2018	Sha & Zam	Dato' Abai	TV3	
2018	Lelaki Kiriman Tuhan	Dad Naira	Astro Oasis	Special appearance
2019	Nur 2	Datuk Ayah Haji Mukhsin	TV3	
2019	Sweet Dreams	Atok Hanapi	Astro Ria	
2019	Lelakimu Yang Dulu	Haji Fuad	TV3	
2019	Gerak Khas (Season 19)	Dato' Effendy	TV2	Episode: "Pancaroba"
2019	TQ Captain	Pak Din	Astro Ria	
2020	Seindah Tujuh Warna Pelangi	Tok Ayah / Dato' Haji Deraman	TV3	
2020	Jalan Sesat Ke Syurga	Zaqwan	Astro Prima	
2020–2021	Angkara Cinta	Tuan Saddam	Astro Prima	
2021	Melastik Ke Hatimu	Wan Asri	TV3	
2021	Keluarga Baha Don (Season 3)	Host	Viu	
2021	Marry Me Senorita	Engku Aziz	Astro Ria	
2021	Hilangkah Janji Kita	Tan Sri Syed	Hypp Sensasi HD	
2021	Langkah Terakhir		TV Okey	
2021	Diva Popular 2		Awesome TV	
2021	Kisah Cinta Kita	Datuk Ramzi	TV3	
2022	3 Nota Cinta	Bahar	TV3	
2022	Nusyuz Berkiblat Cinta	Haji Aris	Astro Ria	
2022	Kerana Aku Isteri Bidaan	Dato' Arbain	TV3	
2022	Demi	Rahman	TV Okey	
2023	Special Force: Anarchy	Datuk Imran Hassan	Disney+ Hotstar	
2023	Imam Instant Ustazah Scammer	Villager	Astro Ria	
2023	Liar	Sulaiman Ibrahim	Astro Ria	
2023	Selalu Ada		TV2	Short
2023	Melastik Ke Hatimu 2	Wan Asri	TV3	
2023	Entitled		Prime Video	
2023	Hikayat Pak Belalang	Sultan	Astro Ceria	
2024	Si Jantung Hati	Zul	Astro Ria	
2024	Mentua	Husin	TV3	

=== Telemovie ===
Year	Title	Role	TV channel
1990	Bukan Impian	Bahrin	TV1
1990	Bingong	Harun	VHS
1995	Diufuk Kasih		TV3
1995	Pencintaan		TV1
1996	Orang Gaji		TV3
1996	Miang Tak Jadi	Abang Syukur	TV3
2000	Misteri Bulan Madu	Azman	VCD
2001	Laman Maut	Host	VCD
2001	Neurose Dwi	Pakcik Omar	VCD
2002	Aku Kaya	Sir Ramli	VCD
2002	Tesis		
2002	Pondok Buruk	Johan	Astro Ria
2003	Aisah Lima Puluh Sen	Rape	Astro Ria
2003	Pondok Buruk 2	Johan	Astro Ria
2003	Neon	DSP Kamal	VCD
2003	Skuad Elit		VCD
2003	Orang Kasar	Datuk Dahlan	VCD
2003	Airmata Ibu		VCD
2003	Leman Nak Pergi Jerman		VCD
2003	Aduhai Esah		TV3
2003	Diari Dewi		VCD
2004	Skandal Glamour		VCD
2004	Rohaya Roy		VCD
2004	Tanah Kubur	Datuk Zarul	Astro Ria
2010	Taubat Nasuha	Hj Osman	TV3
2010	Cinta Akhbar	Tok Majid	TV9
2011	Pusing Beraya	Pak Kassim	TV3
2012	Anak Pak Hussein	Hassan	TV1
2013	Bulan Tiada Madu	Prof. Jalal	TV9
2015	Aku Benci Raya		Astro Ria
2015	Walau Siapa Pun Aku	Datuk Suffian	TV2
2016	Dendam Marisa	Tuan Omar	TV3
2016	Makbul Sekertil Doa	Anuar	TV2
2017	Azam Yang Terlampau		TV2
2017	Musafir Lalu	Ahmad	TV9
2017	Kismet		TV3
2017	Dosa Terlindung	Datuk Nadzri	TV3
2017	Sandal & Serban		Astro Oasis
2017	Siapa Tak Sayang Laki		TV2
2018	Tok Samad	Tok Samad	TV9
2018	Genesis	Datuk Bakhtiar	TV3
2021	Kembar Keliru	Datuk Shah	Awesome TV
2022	Tanah Kubur: Fitnah Akhir Zaman	Pak Shuib	Astro Citra
2022	Semua Tentang Kita		TV3
2022	Sejenis Raya Senariounion		Astro Warna
2023	Quran Pondok Buruk	Johan	Astro Ria
2024	Pinggan, Retak Di Tapak Tangan	Pak Brahim	Astro Ria

=== Television ===
Year	Title	Role	TV channel	Notes
2000–2002	Who Wants to Be a Millionaire?	Host	NTV7	
2014	Maharaja Lawak Mega 2014	Permanent judges	Astro Warna	
2016	Sepahtu Reunion Live	Cameo	Astro Warna	Episode: "Lada Putih Lada Hitam"
2017–2018	Saga Atuk	Host	TV2	with host Adam Hilmy Azmyudin Ray & Heldi Illyana
2017	Sepahtu Reunion Al-Puasa	Cameo	Astro Warna	Episode: "Menantu Raya"
2018	Nona	Invited artist	TV3	
2019	Azan	Host	Astro Oasis	
2022	Sepahtu Reunion Al-Puasa	Cameo	Astro Warna	Episode: "Destinasi Bahagia
2022–2023	The Masked Singer Malaysia (Season 3)	As participants Manggis	Astro Warna	
2023	Travel Lawak Projek Bapak-bapak	Himself	Astro Warna	with Ramli M.S, Roy Azman & Jatt
2023	Mega Spontan	Participants	Astro Warna	
2023	Travel Lawak: Projek Bapak-bapak (Season 2)	Himself	Astro Warna	with Ramli M.S, Roy Azman & Jatt
2024	Travel Lawak: Projek Bapak-bapak (Season 3)	Himself	Astro Warna	with Ramli M.S, Roy Azman & Jatt

=== Podcast ===
Year	Title	Role	Notes
2022	Studio Sembang	Himself	with Amelia Henderson

=== Theater ===
Year	Title
2010	Kita
2013	Asmara Songsang
2022	Teater Tanjong

== Videography ==
=== TV commercials ===
Year	Title	Role	Notes
2005	Jasmin Super 5	—	
2008	MayFirst	Dato' AC Mizal (Featuring. Datuk Jalaluddin Hassan)	
2016	V'Asia TVC Platinium Drink 2016	Himself	

=== Music video ===
Year	Song title	Artist	Ref.
2015	"Generasi Kami (OST Super Boy Game)"	Datuk Jalaluddin Hassan, Dato' Afdlin Shauki, Faizal Tahir, Juzzthin & Wafiy Ceria Popstar	
2016	"Siapa Diriku"	Ayda Jebat	
