= Hulu Kelang (state constituency) =

State constituency in Selangor, Malaysia

Hulu Kelang (N18)
Selangor constituency

State constituency
- Legislature: Selangor State Legislative Assembly
MLA
Azmin Ali
PN
- Constituency created: 1984
- First contested: 1986
- Last contested: 2023

Demographics
- Electors (2023): 71,702

Hulu Kelang is a state constituency in Selangor, Malaysia, that has been represented in the Selangor State Legislative Assembly since 1986. The state constituency was created in the 1984 redistribution and is mandated to return a single member to the Selangor State Legislative Assembly under the first past the post voting system. It has been represented by State Leader of the Opposition Azmin Ali of Perikatan Nasional (PN) since 2023.

== Demographics ==
Ethnic breakdown of Hulu Kelang's electorate as of 2023
1. Malay (81.9%)
2. Chinese (8.65%)
3. Other ethnicities (5.49%)
4. Indian (4.01%)

== History ==
=== Polling districts ===
According to the federal gazette issued on 30 March 2018, the Hulu Kelang constituency is divided into 20 polling districts.

State constituency	Polling districts	Code	Location
Hulu Kelang（N18）	Bandar Melawati	098/18/01	SK Taman Melawati (2)
Hulu Kelang（N18）	Kelang Gate	098/18/02	SK Klang Gate
Hulu Kelang（N18）	Taman Melawati	098/18/03	SMK Taman Melawati
Hulu Kelang（N18）	Kemensah	098/18/04	KAFA Integrasi Kampung Kemensah
Hulu Kelang（N18）	Hulu Kelang	098/18/05	SK Hulu Kelang
Hulu Kelang（N18）	Taman Permata	098/18/06	SK Taman Permata
Hulu Kelang（N18）	Keramat Tengah AU 4	098/18/07	SA Rakyat (KAFA Integrasi) AU 4
Hulu Kelang（N18）	AU 3 Rumah Teres	098/18/08	SA Rakyat (KAFA Integrasi) Al-Khairiah AU3
Hulu Kelang（N18）	Sri Keramat AU 2a	098/18/09	SR Agama Integrasi Taman Keramat
Hulu Kelang（N18）	Keramat AU 1	098/18/10	SAR (KAFA Integrasi) Al-Aziziah AU1
Hulu Kelang（N18）	Keramat Pangsa	098/18/11	Pusat Komuniti Rakyat Rumah Pangsa Taman Keramat AU2
Hulu Kelang（N18）	Melawati Jalan F & H	098/18/12	SK Taman Melawati
Hulu Kelang（N18）	Lembah Keramat AU 5c	098/18/13	SK Lembah Keramat
Hulu Kelang（N18）	Desa Keramat AU 2b & AU 2c	098/18/14	Dewan Serbaguna Taman Sri Keramat AU2
Hulu Kelang（N18）	Lembah Keramat AU 5d	098/18/15	SAR KAFA Integrasi At-Taqwa
Hulu Kelang（N18）	Keramat AU 1b	098/18/16	Dewan Pusat Komuniti Wanita Dan Belia Hulu Kelang
Hulu Kelang（N18）	AU3 Rumah Pangsa	098/18/17	Pusat Komuniti Rakyat Sri Pangsa AU 3/1
Hulu Kelang（N18）	Melawati Jalan G.E.C	098/18/18	SA Rakyat Taman Melawati
Hulu Kelang（N18）	Enggang Utara	098/18/19	SMK Taman Keramat
Hulu Kelang（N18）	Enggang Selatan	098/18/20	SK Taman Keramat 1; SMK Hulu Kelang

=== Representation history ===
Members of the Legislative Assembly for Hulu Kelang
Assembly	No	Years	Member	Party
Constituency created from Dusun Tua
Ulu Kelang
7th	N19	1986-1990	Rakibah Abdul Manap	BN (UMNO)
8th	N19	1990-1995	Fuad Hassan	BN (UMNO)
Hulu Kelang
9th	N18	1995-1999	Fuad Hassan	BN (UMNO)
10th	N18	1999-2004	Mohamed Azmin Ali	BA (KeADILan)
11th	N18	2004-2008	Ahmad Bujang	BN (UMNO)
12th	N18	2008-2013	Saari Sungib	PR (PAS)
13th	N18	2013-2015	Saari Sungib	PR (PAS)
13th	N18	2015-2018	Saari Sungib	AMANAH
14th	N18	2018–2023	Saari Sungib	PH (AMANAH)
15th	N18	2023–present	Mohamed Azmin Ali	PN (BERSATU)

== Election results ==
Selangor state election, 2023
Party	Candidate	Votes	%	∆%
PN	Mohamed Azmin Ali	25,597	51.63	▲51.63
PH	Juwairiya Zulkifli	23,980	48.37	▼10.52
Total valid votes		49,577	100.00	
Total rejected ballots		194		
Unreturned ballots		73		
Turnout		49,844	69.52	▼16.37
Registered electors		71,702		
Majority		1,617	3.26	▼31.84
PN gain from PKR		Swing		?

Selangor state election, 2018
Party	Candidate	Votes	%	∆%
PKR	Saari Sungib	25,746	58.89	▲58.89
BN	Ismail Ahmad	10,397	23.79	▼22.59
PAS	Kamalulhysham Mohd Suhut	7,573	17.32	▼36.30
Total valid votes		43,716	100.00	
Total rejected ballots		239		
Unreturned ballots		254		
Turnout		44,209	85.89	▼1.33
Registered electors		51,471		
Majority		15,349	35.10	▲27.86
PKR gain from PAS		Swing		?

Selangor state election, 2013
Party	Candidate	Votes	%	∆%
PAS	Saari Sungib	21,310	53.62	▼0.10
BN	Abdul Rahim Pandak Kamarudin	18,429	46.38	▲0.10
Total valid votes		39,739	100.00	
Total rejected ballots		360		
Unreturned ballots		142		
Turnout		40,241	87.22	▲11.34
Registered electors		46,136		
Majority		2,881	7.24	▼0.20
PAS hold		Swing		
Source(s) "Federal Government Gazette - Notice of Contested Election, State Legislative Assembly for the State of Selangor [P.U. (B) 192/2013]" (PDF). Attorney General's Chambers of Malaysia. 26 April 2013. Archived from the original (PDF) on 2019-12-29. "Federal Government Gazette - Results of Contested Election and Statements of the Poll after the Official Addition of Votes, State Constituencies for the State of Selangor [P.U. (B) 233/2013]" (PDF). Attorney General's Chambers of Malaysia. 22 May 2013. Archived from the original (PDF) on 2018-10-02.

Selangor state election, 2008
Party	Candidate	Votes	%	∆%
PAS	Saari Sungib	15,404	53.72	▲53.72
BN	Ahmad Bujang	13,270	46.28	▼16.00
Total valid votes		28,674	100.00	
Total rejected ballots		302		
Unreturned ballots		202		
Turnout		29,178	75.88	▼0.55
Registered electors		38,454		
Majority		2,134	7.44	▼17.73
PAS gain from BN		Swing		?

Selangor state election, 2004
Party	Candidate	Votes	%	∆%
BN	Ahmad Bujang	17,013	62.28	▲15.61
PKR	Abdul Rahman Othman	10,137	37.11	▼16.22
Independent	Ahmad Rahamat	166	0.61	▲0.61
Total valid votes		27,316	100.00	
Total rejected ballots		180		
Unreturned ballots		3		
Turnout		27,499	76.43	▲0.01
Registered electors		35,980		
Majority		6,876	25.17	▲18.51
BN gain from PKR		Swing		?

Selangor state election, 1999
Party	Candidate	Votes	%	∆%
PKR	Mohamed Azmin Ali	9,185	53.33	▲53.33
BN	Fuad Hassan	8,039	46.67	▼38.31
Total valid votes		17,224	100.00	
Total rejected ballots		168		
Unreturned ballots		0		
Turnout		17,392	76.42	▲5.26
Registered electors		22,759		
Majority		1,146	6.66	▼63.30
PKR gain from BN		Swing		?

Selangor state election, 1995
Party	Candidate	Votes	%	∆%
BN	Fuad Hassan	12,481	84.98	▲15.45
S46	Minhat Sulaiman	2,206	15.02	▼15.45
Total valid votes		14,687	100.00	
Total rejected ballots		203		
Unreturned ballots		159		
Turnout		15,049	71.66	▼1.81
Registered electors		21,000		
Majority		10,275	69.96	▲30.90
BN hold		Swing		

Selangor state election, 1990
Party	Candidate	Votes	%	∆%
BN	Fuad Hassan	11,585	69.53	▼10.68
S46	Mohd Fahmi Ibrahim	5,077	30.47	▲30.47
Total valid votes		16,662	100.00	
Total rejected ballots		229		
Unreturned ballots		0		
Turnout		16,891	73.67	▲12.28
Registered electors		22,928		
Majority		6,508	39.06	▼21.60
BN hold		Swing		

Selangor state election, 1986
Party	Candidate	Votes	%
BN	Rakibah Abdul Manap	10,250	80.21
PAS	Ibrahim Moksen	2,529	19.79
Total valid votes		12,779	100.00
Total rejected ballots		261	
Unreturned ballots		0	
Turnout		13,040	61.39
Registered electors		21,242	
Majority		7,721	60.42
This was a new constituency created.
