= Shah Alam Royal Mausoleum =

Mausoleum in Selangor, Malaysia

Coordinates: 3°4′58.9″N 101°31′6.3″E

Shah Alam Royal Mausoleum (Malay: Makam Diraja Shah Alam) is a royal mausoleum of Selangor. The mausoleum is located near Sultan Salahuddin Abdul Aziz Shah Mosque in the state capital of Shah Alam, Malaysia.

== List of graves ==
=== Royal family graves ===
- Raja Saidatul Ihsan binti Almarhum Raja Bendahara Tengku Badar Shah – Paduka Bonda Raja Selangor (died 31 May 2011)
- Lt. Col. Tunku Dato' Mokhtar Tunku Mohammad Jewa - brother of Tunku Osman Tunku Mohammad Jewa and Tunku Ismail Tunku Mohammad Jewa of Kedah royal family - (died 2012)
- Tengku Puteri Aishah binti Almarhum Sultan Salahuddin Abdul Aziz Shah - (died 30 July 2012)
- Tunku Anita Abdiyah binti Tunku Adnan of Negeri Sembilan royal family - Tengku Puan Panglima Besar Selangor (died 8 December 2012)
- Tengku Puteri Sofiah binti Almarhum Sultan Salahuddin Abdul Aziz Shah -(died 8 June 2017)
- To' Puan Pengiran Hajah Zaliha binti Pengiran Haji Tengah of Brunei royal family - (died 14 December 2022)
- Tengku Putri Arafiah binti Almarhum Sultan Salahuddin Abdul Aziz Shah -(died 26 June 2026)

=== Leaders' graves ===
- Dato' Ishak Baharom – Selangor state Mufti (1985–1997) (died 2008)
- Tan Sri Abu Hassan Omar – 12th Menteri Besar of Selangor (1997–2000) (died 8 September 2018)
- Tan Sri Hassan Azhari – Tokoh Agama dan penerima Anugerah Tokoh Ma'al Hijrah 2002 (meninggal dunia 6 Oktober 2018)
- Tun Arshad Ayub – Universiti Teknologi MARA Pro-Chancellor (died 14 June 2022)
- Tan Sri Abdul Khalid Ibrahim – 14th Menteri Besar of Selangor (2008–2014) (died 31 July 2022)
