= Mohd Rashdan Baba =

Malaysian academic

Yang Berbahagia Tan Sri Mohd Rashdan Baba PSM SIMP SUNS DPMS JSM

1st Vice-Chancellor of the Universiti Putra Malaysia
- In office 4 November 1971 – 28 February 1982
- Chancellor: Salahuddin of Selangor
- Preceded by: Office established
- Succeeded by: Nayan Ariffin

1st Vice-Chancellor of the National University of Malaysia
- In office 1 September 1969 – 31 March 1971
- Preceded by: Office established
- Succeeded by: Ariffin Ngah Marzuki

Personal details
- Born: 31 October 1935 Kampung Berkat, Chembong, Rembau, Negeri Sembilan
- Died: 30 March 2020 (aged 84) Ampang Puteri Specialist Hospital, Ampang, Selangor
- Resting place: Bukit Kiara Muslim Cemetery, Damansara
- Spouse: Robiyah Abdul Majid
- Children: 1 daughter (Rayslida)
- Education: University of Reading (BSc); University of Leeds (PhD)

Mohd Rashdan bin Baba is a Malaysian academic administrator. He was the first Vice-Chancellor of National University of Malaysia from 1969 until 1971. As Universiti Putra Malaysia established in 1971, he became the first Vice-Chancellor of UPM until 1982, succeed by Nayan Ariffin.

== Education background ==
After he obtained his diploma degree in agriculture from College of Agriculture Malaya, he finished Bachelor's degree in Agricultural Science from University of Reading and doctoral degree from University of Leeds, became the first Malay who successfully obtained the PhD in field of agronomy.

== Career ==
=== Principal of the College of Agriculture Malaya ===
At the age of 30, Mohd Rashdan was appointed as the Pincipal of the College of Agriculture Malaya, succeed G.I.M. Martin who has retired. This appointment in 1965 made him the first Malay to hold the position.

=== First Vice-Chancellor of UKM and UPM ===
As one of the members of Working Committee that recommended the establishment of UKM, Mohd Rashdan appointed as the first Vice-Chancellor of UKM in 1969. While the College of Agriculture Malaya upgraded into a university in 1971, once again he went back to the institute and lead UPM until 1982.

=== Involvement in corporate field ===
Apart from academic field, Mohd Rashdan also active in the corporate field. He was appointed as the chairman of Telekom Malaysia from 1985 to 1997, and as the director of Amcorp Group Berhad from 1988 until 2007.

== Honours ==
=== Honours of Malaysia ===
- Malaysia :
  - Commander of the Order of Loyalty to the Crown of Malaysia (PSM) – Tan Sri (1974)
  - Companion of the Order of Loyalty to the Crown of Malaysia (JSM) (1969)
- Negeri Sembilan :
  - Principal Grand Knight of the Order of Loyalty to Negeri Sembilan (SUNS) – Dato' Seri Utama (2015)
- Pahang :
  - Knight Grand Companion of the Order of the Crown of Pahang (SIMP) – formerly Dato', now Dato' Indera (1991)
- Selangor :
  - Knight Commander of the Order of the Crown of Selangor (DPMS) – Dato' (1977)

=== Honorary degrees ===
- Malaysia
  - Emeritus Professor from Universiti Pertanian Malaysia (14 August 1982)
  - Honorary Doctorate in Law from National University of Malaysia (3 July 1999)
- United Kingdom
  - Honorary Doctor of Science from University of Reading (1986)
  - Honorary Doctor of Law from University of Leeds (1989)

=== Award ===
- National Academician of the Year 2013

Academic offices
Preceded by Office established	Vice-Chancellor of the Universiti Putra Malaysia; 1971 – 1982	Succeeded by Nayan Ariffin
Preceded by Office established	Vice-Chancellor of the National University of Malaysia; 1969 – 1971	Succeeded by Ariffin Ngah Marzuki
