= Order of Sultan Salahuddin Abdul Aziz Shah =

Order of Sultan Salahuddin Abdul Aziz Shah Darjah Kebesaran Sultan Salahuddin Abdul Aziz Shah

Awarded by Sultan of Selangor
- Type: Chivalric order
- Founded: 30 September 1985
- Status: Obsolete since 2001
- Founder: Salahuddin Abdul Aziz Shah
- Grand Master: Sultan Sharafuddin Idris Shah
- Classes: Knight Grand Companion; Knight Companion; Companion; Member
- Post-nominals: S.S.S.A.; D.S.S.A.; S.S.A.; A.S.A.

Statistics
- First induction: 10 October 1985
- Last induction: 2001

Precedence
- Next (higher): Order of the Crown of Selangor
- Next (lower): Distinguished Service Star
- Equivalent: Order of Sultan Sharafuddin Idris Shah
- Knight Grand Companion Knight Companion Companion Member; Ribbon bar

The Order of Sultan Salahuddin Abdul Aziz Shah (Malay: Darjah Kebesaran Sultan Salahuddin Abdul Aziz Shah) is an obsolete order of chivalry conferred by the Sultan of Selangor as a reward for general services to the sultan and state of Selangor during the reigning of the late Sultan Salahuddin Abdul Aziz Shah Al-Haj. It was established by the late Sultan on 30 September 1985 and it became obsolete following his demise on 21 November 2001. The order was awarded to high-ranking individuals who have contributed excellence to the Sultan of Selangor and His Majesty's Government.

The order ranked below the Order of the Crown of Selangor and is currently ranked as the fourth order of chivalry, ranking equivalent to the extant Order of Sultan Sharafuddin Idris Shah.

== Classes ==
The four classes of appointment to the Order are, in descending order of precedence:

1. Knight Grand Companion or Dato' Setia Sultan Salahuddin Abdul Aziz (SSSA)
2. Knight Companion or Dato' Sultan Salahuddin Abdul Aziz (DSSA)
3. Companion or Setia Sultan Salahuddin Abdul Aziz (SSA)
4. Member or Ahli Sultan Salahuddin Abdul Aziz (ASA)

== Styles ==
Male recipients of Knight Grand Companion class or Dato' Setia Sultan Salahuddin Abdul Aziz (SSSA) bear the title of Dato' Seri and their female spouse Datin Seri. Female recipients of the order bear the title of Datin Paduka Seri, while their husbands do not bear any title.

Male recipients of Knight Companion class or Dato' Sultan Salahuddin Abdul Aziz (DSSA) bear the title of Dato' and their female spouse Datin. Female recipients of the order bear the title of Datin Paduka, while their husbands do not bear any title.

Recipients of the Companion and Member class do not bear any title.

== Insignia ==
=== Knight Grand Companion ===
It is awarded in a set of breast star, a collar, a badge and a yellow coloured sash with two red stripes and a central red stripe, worn from right shoulder to the left waist.

The collar is made of gold-plated silver. It is 132 cm long and worn on the same length at the front and back. This necklace has 14 connecting chain links. The two middle chains contain compositions of two crossed Selangor flags. Six of the remaining chain links are round and the other six are nonagon in shape, and are arranged alternately. The round shaped links contain the word "Sultan Abdul Aziz Shah" while the rest contain "Selangor Darul Ehsan" phrase. They are written in Islamic calligraphy. Each of these compositions are made of enamel.

The breast star is made of gold-plated silver, its surface length is 9 cm long and has nine fractions. In the center of this star is the word "Sultan Abdul Aziz Shah Selangor", written both in rumi and khat, with red enamel as its base.

The badge has the same design as the breast star. Its surface length is 6 cm long. The center part of the badge is oval in shape, 2.07 cm wide and 3.05 cm high. It has engraving of the word "Sultan Abdul Aziz Shah Selangor" in rumi on red enamel background. At the top part of the badge, there is a decoration in the form of the Sultan's crown which is 2.2 cm in height. This badge is made to be suspended on the collar or sash.

The sash is made of yellow silk cloth 11.7 cm in width for male, 7.7 cm for female, with two red stripes on each sides and a wide central red stripe.

=== Knight Companion ===
It is awarded in a set of breast star, a badge and a red coloured sash with two yellow stripes and two red stripes, both are to the right of the red band in the middle of the sash.

Similar to the male sash, it has two red strips and two yellow strips, both are 0.19 cm wide to the right of the yellow band in the middle of the sash.

The shape of the breast star is the same as the Knight Grand Companion's. The center of the star contains the royal symbol. The symbol is shown on emerald green background, replacing the engraved script in red enamel background in the former. The badge is also of the same size and shape as Knight Grand Companion's but with emerald green enamel background.

The sash is made of yellow silk cloth 11.7 cm in width for male, 7.7 cm for female.

== Recipients ==
=== Knight Grand Companion (S.S.S.A.) ===
- 1985: Ghazali Shafie
- 1985: Hashim Aman
- 1985: Abdul Majid Ismail
- 1985: Othman bin Bokhari
- 1985: Harry Tong Lee Hwa
- 1990: Sanusi Junid
- 1990: Mohamed Rahmat
- 1992: Tengku Ahmad Shah
- ~~1992: Anwar Ibrahim~~ (revoked 20 November 2014)
- 1992: Abu Talib Othman
- 1992: Ahmad Sarji Abdul Hamid
- 1992: Mohammed Hanif Omar
- 1993: Tengku Abdul Samad Shah
- 1993: Sulaiman Mohd Amin
- 1996: Tengku Puteri Nor Marina
- 1996: Raja Mohar
- 1996: Raja Dzulkifli
- 1997: Jacob a/l Sigamoney
- 1999: Onn Ismail
- 1999: Saleh Sulong
- 1999: Kok Mew Shoon
- 2000: Suleiman bin Mohamed
- 2000: Tiong King Sing
- 2001: Zaleha Ismail
- 2001: Lim Bock Seng

=== Knight Companion (D.S.S.A.) ===
- 1985: Ramli Abdul Rahman
- 1985: Ng Thian Hock
- 1985: Abu Bakar Abdul Hamid
- 1985: Mohammad Zain Salleh
- 1985: Ahmad Zainal Abidin Muhammad Yusof
- 1985: Hassan Haji Omar
- 1985: Nayan Ariffin
- 1985: Lee Eng Teh
- 1985: Eu Eng Hock
- 1985: Wong Fook Shang
- 1985: Takashi Ishihara
- 1985: Ling Beng King
- 1985: Ong Kim Hoay
- 1985: Ruby Lee
- 1985: Abdul Rahim Mohd. Ibrahim
- 1985: Tan Ming Swee
- 1985: Abdul Shattar Abdul Rahim
- 1985: Lem Siang @ Lim Lee Cheng
- 1985: Hui Guan Lian
- 1987: Ismail Tamim Abdul Aziz Bantan Alhafiz
- 1987: Hassan Azhari
- 1987: Jimmy Ng Keng Joo
- 1987: Abdul Hadi Sidek
- 1988: Abu Sujak Mahmud
- 1988: Mokhtar Haji Ahmad
- 1988: Jaludin Mohd Limbang
- 1988: Mahmad Muhtar Mahmad Saleh
- 1988: Musa Mustakim
- 1988: Baharudin Osman
- 1988: Mohamed Ali Madar Sahib @ Haji H.M.S. Ali
- 1988: Syed Alwi Syed Nasir
- 1988: Ng Mann Cheong
- 1988: Chan Ah Chye @ Chan Chong Yoon
- 1988: Chen Lip Keong
- 1989: Abdullah Haji Kuntom
- 1989: Kaharuddin Momin
- 1989: Mufti Suib
- 1989: Abdul Shukur Bin Haji Siraj
- 1989: Elyas Omar
- 1989: Mohtar Abdullah
- 1989: Sulaiman Hashim
- 1989: Madzlan Muraidin
- 1989: Samsuri Arshad
- 1989: Jamlus Abdul Kadir
- 1989: Sidek Abdullah Kamar
- 1989: Nasir Osman bin Abas
- 1989: Abdul Khalid Mohd Said
- 1989: Mohamed Ramli Samjis
- 1989: Ong Chin Chan @ Ong Chin Chye
- 1989: Keshmahinder Singh
- 1990: Ishak Baharom
- 1990: Basri Bajuri
- 1990: Tengku Ramli Shahruddin Shah
- 1990: Mohd Hussein Ahmad
- 1990: Abu Kassim Ahmad
- 1990: Teong Teck Lai
- 1990: Abdul Rahman Kalam
- 1990: Koh Eng Hooi
- 1990: Akio Tanii
- 1991: Maruthathurai @ Munusamy a/l Thangiah
- 1991: Jaya Rakna Mahmood Ambak
- 1991: M. Zain Sulaiman
- 1991: Mohd Karim Abdullah Omar
- 1991: Mohd Aini Taib
- 1991: Abdul Karim Abu Bakar
- 1991: Abdul Rashid Mohamed Hussain
- 1991: Rinaldo Romani
- 1991: Takamitsu Mukai
- 1991: Thiagarajah a/l Nadarajah
- 1991: Loo Yew Kiong
- 1991: Md. Ali bin Haji Ayat
- 1991: Ab. Kadir Yaacob
- 1991: Nurlidar Saidi
- 1992: Abdullah Ahmad Badawi
- 1992: Sulaiman Daud
- 1992: Mohd Yusof Noor
- 1992: Megat Junid
- 1992: Wan Abu Bakar Wan Mohamed
- 1992: Mohammad Shaharul Hasri Mahmood
- 1992: Abdul Rahim Othman
- 1992: Kew Siang Tong
- 1992: Tunku Khadijah
- 1992: Anuar Masduki
- 1992: Santha Kumari a/p Velupillai Natkunam
- 1992: Charles Muriel
- 1992: Salim Sheikh Mohammad
- 1992: Mustapha Kamal Abu Bakar
- 1992: Mokhtar Omar
- 1992: Low Keng Seng
- 1992: Victor Hoe Eng Sim
- 1992: Foo Chu Jong
- 1992: Teo Chiang Kok
- 1993: Iskandar Dzulkarnain Badarudin
- 1993: Tang See Hang
- 1993: S. S. Subramaniam
- 1993: Khalid Ismail
- 1993: Abdul Rashid bin Abdullah
- 1993: Akira Okabe
- 1993: Abdul Latif Mohd Hassan
- 1993: Tengku Putra
- 1993: Low Chee Choon
- 1993: Kumarasingham a/l Ratnasingam
- 1993: Adam Abdul Ahad Adam Abdul Rahim
- 1993: Lau Ban Tin
- 1994: Megat Najmuddin
- 1994: Siti Fatimah Suhaimi
- 1994: Sellathevan a/l Muthusamy
- 1994: Azlan bin Hashim
- 1994: Mohd Ramli Lajan
- 1994: Idris Denan
- 1994: Abdul Samad Maharuddin
- 1994: Syed Jalaludin Syed Salim
- 1994: Badri bin Haji Masri
- 1994: Nur Hayati Mohamed
- 1994: Mohd Yusof Mohamed
- 1994: Tong Kok Mau
- 1994: Raduan Md. Taib
- 1994: Rosedin Yaacob
- 1994: Mohammed Adnan Shuaib
- 1994: Lee Boon Keng
- 1994: Benson Lim Heng Kein
- 1994: Ramli Norani
- 1994: Sheikh Ahmad Sheikh Sadarudin
- 1994: Zazlan Mohamed Samin
- 1994: Lim Heen Peok
- 1994: Lee Kim Yew
- 1994: Yap Kim San
- 1994: Samsudin bin Abu Hassan
- 1994: Ding Lian Cheon
- 1994: Loo Keng An @ Lee Kim An
- 1994: Rakibah Abdul Manap
- 1994: Kamaruddin Nordin
- 1996: Ahmad Bhari Abd. Rahman
- 1996: Fuad Hassan
- 1996: Jamaluddin Adnan
- 1996: Tai Chang Eng @ Teh Chang Ying
- 1996: Abdul Rahman Palil
- 1996: Zainal Abidin Sakom
- 1996: Mahbud Hashim
- 1996: G. Palanivel
- 1996: Zakaria Md. Deros
- 1996: Othman Abdul
- 1996: Muhamad Zohadie Bardaie
- 1996: Tan Hui Meng
- 1996: Mohd Ariffin Mohamad
- 1996: Zakariah Ahmad
- 1996: Anuar Maarof
- 1996: Syed Hussein Syed Abu Bakar
- 1996: Mohammad Meswan Dol
- 1996: Mohd Fadzilah Kamsah
- 1996: Shamsudin Noor
- 1996: Mohd Yusof Abd. Latif
- 1996: Ismail Kamus
- 1996: Rozali Ismail
- 1996: Soh Chai Hock
- 1996: Nasaruddin Abdul Jalil
- 1996: Tan Book Hock @ Tan Ah Chow
- 1996: Ambrose Leonard Ng Kwee Heng
- 1996: Tiong King Sing
- 1996: Sri Ram Sarma
- 1996: Ho Tet Keong
- 1996: Tong Kiot Seng @ Tong Yoke Kim
- 1996: Yap Suan Chee
- 1996: Sari @ Shaari bin Majihin @ Mat Jihin
- 1996: Hu Sang @ Oo Sze Yen
- 1996: Tee Ah Seng @ Steven Tee
- 1996: Johan Arif Abdullah Arif
- 1996: Ho Tet Keong
- 1996: Wong Lum Kong @ Robert Wong
- 1996: P. G. D. Hendry
- 1996: Salleh Pateh Akhir
- 1996: Ruslan Ali Omar
- 1996: Mat Abas Mat Yusoff
- 1996: Kamarul Baharin Abbas
- 1996: Cheng Hup
- 1996: Tan Kim Hua
- 1996: Tan Sing Kang
- 1996: Low Wui Keong
- 1996: Krishnan a/l Perumal
- 1996: Zaitun Samsudin
- 1996: Yong Mun Kuen @ Mrs. Chen
- 1997: Abdul Aziz Mohd Yusof
- 1997: Mohamad Satim Diman
- 1997: Suhaimi Ibrahim
- 1997: Wan Intan Wan Ahmad Tajuddin
- 1997: Eng Hoi Choo
- 1997: Mat Yasir bin Juli
- 1997: Kamarazzaman bin Alias
- 1997: Hod bin Parman
- 1997: Mohd Nor bin Bador
- 1997: Mohd Amin Md. Saleh
- 1997: Mohd Nahwari Haji Hashim
- 1997: Zorkarnain Abd. Rahman
- 1997: Mahmood Awg Kechik
- 1997: Mohinder Singh @ Kaka Singh a/l S. Sucha Singh
- 1997: Bahari Abu Mansur
- 1997: Adam Harun
- 1997: K. Ampikaipakan
- 1997: Mohamed Yaacob
- 1997: Saidin Adam
- 1997: Hashim Mahmood
- 1997: Lim Soon Peng
- 1997: Kamal Hussain
- 1997: Mohamed Said
- 1997: Mohd Yasin Taib
- 1997: Yasuo Takahashi
- 1997: Tan Hua Tong
- 1997: Soo Jee Sin @ Too Gee Ban
- 1997: Tee Boon Kee
- 1997: Aripin Mokhtar
- 1997: Yaakub Shah Ali Shah
- 1997: Mohd Said Mat Saman
- 1997: Yeong Kok Hee
- 1997: Paul Koon Poh Keong
- 1997: Patrick Lim Soo Kit
- 1997: Abdul Shukor Mohamed
- 1997: Peter Kuah Tian Nam
- 1997: Noor Azman @ Noor Hizam Nurdin
- 1997: Zainuddin Abd. Rahman
- 1997: Hui Swee Leong
- 1997: Sivaparanjothi a/l Vellupillai
- 1997: Jaafar Hamzah
- 1997: Mohd Yusoff Mohd Mizan
- 1997: Abdul Jabar Kamin
- 1997: Mohd Hashim Hassan
- 1997: Adnan Buyong
- 1997: Tan Guan Cheong
- 1997: Mohamed Idris Abu Bakar
- 1997: Kuang Eng Kong @ Kuan Yong Kuan
- 1997: Rahmat Jamari
- 1997: Edmond Lee Kam Sun
- 1997: Gan Kim Siong
- 1997: Yeoh Seok Kian
- 1997: Ng Thean Lai @ Peter Ng
- 1997: Lim Teng Lew
- 1997: Shafie Salleh
- 1997: Mohd Mokhtar Ahmad Dahlan
- 1997: Shahaneem Hanoum Dadameah
- 1999: Jaei Ismail
- 1999: Shoib Md Silin
- 1999: Raja Ideris Raja Ahmad
- 1999: Lee Hwa Beng
- 1999: Othman B. Rijal
- 1999: Vengadesan a/l Ramanathan
- 1999: Rajmah Hussain
- 1999: Ahmadi bin Haji Asnawi
- 1999: Amir Sharifuddin Abu Bakar
- 1999: Mohamad Adzib Mohd Isa
- 1999: Karim bin Marzuki
- 1999: Asaha @ Ishak bin Abong
- 1999: Mariman bin Mohd Taib
- ~~1999: Md. Sabree bin Salleh~~ (revoked 23 April 2012)
- 1999: Mahfodz Mohamed
- 1999: Ahmad Shukor Mohd Noor
- 1999: Firdaus Abdullah
- 1999: Juma'ah Moktar
- ~~1999: Mohamad Shafie~~ (suspended 2 August 2007)
- 1999: Yusof Ibrahim
- 1999: Mohd Nasir Abu Mansor
- 1999: Kenneth Soh York Beng
- 1999: Ng Kee Seng
- 1999: Shamsuddin Jamil
- 1999: Mohan Singh
- 1999: Lim Khoon Heng
- 1999: Abd. Halim Ali
- 1999: Alias Mohd Yusof
- 1999: Ahmad Mahir Kamaruddin
- 1999: Ishak Jaafar
- 1999: Mohamad Hasan
- 1999: Wong Woon Yow
- 1999: Omardin Mawaidin
- 1999: Sulaiman Samat
- 1999: Seow Yong Chin
- 1999: Karupiah @ Sellapan a/l Veerapan
- 1999: Mahmud Othman
- 1999: Ong Yow Siang
- 1999: Sahlan Sidik
- 1999: Abu Kassim Tadin
- 1999: Francis Ch'ng Hwee Heong
- 1999: Siew Kah Fatt
- 1999: Tan Hap @ Tan Hwa Ho
- 1999: Lim Beng Huat @ Lim Thor
- 1999: Tong So Han (Andrew)
- 1999: Lai Lok Kun
- 1999: Teo Chiang Liang
- 1999: Zainal Akidin Osman
- 1999: Sim Bee Ming
- 1999: Mohd Som Osman
- 1999: Shaary @ Abdullah Suny
- 1999: Khalid Ahmad
- 1999: Teo Chiang Hong
- 1999: Hasmuni Hussein
- ~~1999: Lim Ban Kay @ Lim Chiam Boon~~ (revoked 27 March 2003)
- 1999: Tan Hock Low
- 1999: Tan Kim Leong
- 2000: Mohd. Zawawi Salleh
- 2000: Raja Arshad
- 2000: Seripah Noli Syed Hussin
- 2000: Tan Yee Kew
- 2000: Tee Tiong Hock
- 2000: Mad Aris Mad Yusof
- 2000: Mohd. Sinon Mudzakir
- 2000: Kalsom binti Abdul Rahman
- 2000: Mohd Ariffin Yaacob
- 2000: Emran Kadir
- 2000: Abdul Karim Munisar
- 2000: B. Ranjit Singh
- 2000: Ismail Abdul Rahim
- 2000: Musa Hassan
- 2000: Mohd Ariffin Aton
- 2000: Melanie Leong Sook Lei
- 2000: Zubir Haji Ali
- 2000: Abdullah Yatim
- 2000: Zain Ibrahim
- 2000: Zakaria Sam
- 2000: Samsudin Sairan
- 2000: Abdul Razak Salleh
- 2000: Lim Cheng Poh
- 2000: Zahridah Ismail
- 2000: Mohamed Annuar Shamsudin
- 2000: Selvapragasam a/l Thambiah
- 2000: Shamsudin Tugiman
- 2000: Nyanapandithan@Gnanapandithan a/l Muthandi@M. G. Pandithan
- 2000: Mohd Yusoff Dahlan
- 2000: Senan@Hasnan Ad. Wahid
- 2000: Jamian Mohamd @ Mad Semaal
- 2000: N. Periasamy a/l Nadeson
- 2000: Mukhtar Samad
- 2000: Jeyaindran Sinnadurai
- 2000: Yip Kam Chong
- 2000: Lim Chee Kiat
- 2000: C. Krishnan
- 2000: Lim Hock San
- 2000: Tan Chuy @ Tan Chin Huat
- 2000: Ang Chin Guan
- 2000: Stanley Chew Eng Teck
- 2000: Seow Cho Thoy
- 2000: Teh Kim Poo
- 2000: Kuah Lai Huat @ All Lai Huat
- 2000: Ng Hock Bee
- 2000: Mah King Thian
- 2000: Tan Kean Wan
- 2000: Maswari Awi
- 2000: Lim Yew Loong
- 2000: Michael Ong Leng Chun
- 2000: Tengku Zainal Rashid
- 2000: Tan Tiang Kwong
- 2000: Palany Sastry a/l Raman
- 2000: William Say Kam Wah
- 2000: Yee Yok Tin
- 2000: Syed Amin Aljeffri
- 2000: Jamal Kisnan
- 2000: Kamaruddin Abdullah
- 2000: Blace Tow@Teo Swee Cheng
- 2000: Mohd Husin Mohamed Anwar
- 2000: Mohd Amin Hassan
- ~~2000: Chee Kok Wing~~ (suspended 2 August 2007)
- 2000: Hamzah Abdul Rahman
- 2000: Salleh Ahmad
- 2000: Abdul Rahman Abdul Hamid
- 2000: Ibrahim Kam / Kassim
- 2000: Yusoff Hassan
- 2001: Tengku Shahruddin Shah
- 2001: Ei Kim Hock
- 2001: Liew Chee Kong @ Liew Che Choong
- 2001: Liew Yuen Keong
- 2001: Hoh Hee Lee
- 2001: Chia Kim Lem
- 2001: Mesrah Selamat
- ~~2001: Phang Oi Choo@Phang Ai Tu~~ (revoked 2021)
- 2001: Abdul Ghani Minhat
- 2001: Abdul Halim Mohd. Nawawi
- 2001: Sulaiman Md. Yassin
- 2001: Halimaton Saadiah Hashim
- 2001: Lau Siew Gek
- 2001: Mushardin Mohamed Said
- 2001: Adnan Saidi (posthumously)
- 2001: Ramlan Othman
- 2001: Ahmad Latffi Hashim
- 2001: Mansur Ramli
- 2001: Ibrahim Yakub
- 2001: Husin Taib
- 2001: Yusoff Abdullah
- 2001: Md. Lazim Ahmad
- 2001: Mohd. Said Ismail
- 2001: Zakaria Abdul Rahman
- 2001: Mansor Md. Jaafar
- 2001: Ng Tiong Seng
- 2001: Thomas Tong Kin Yoong
- 2001: Jeffry Lim Huat Soon
- 2001: Heng Fook Kum
- 2001: Aidit Ghazali
- 2001: Yeoh Seok Kah
- 2001: Wan Zakariah Wan Muda
- 2001: Ng Teck Hoe
- 2001: Sofiah Md. Nor
- 2001: Mohamad Abdullah
- 2001: Boopalan a/l Paramasamy
- 2001: Mokhtar Dahari (posthumously)
- 2001: Tee Boon Kee
- 2001: Azman Ibrahim
- 2001: Stephen Voon Chee Keong
- 2001: Lee Su Ha
- 2001: Ong Teh Kim
- 2001: Johari Mat
- 2001: Koay Soon Eng
- 2001: Abrar Mohd. Rafie
- 2001: Low Tuck Kwong
- 2001: Hui Swee Seong
- 2001: Hong Yee Keong
- 2001: See Teow Chuan
- 2001: Chuah Teong Tat
- 2001: Kok Om
- 2001: Raja Wahid
- 2001: Anwar Haji @ Aji
- 2001: Loke Fay
- 2001: Loga Bala Mohan Jaganathan
- 2001: Foo Sae Heng
- 2001: Kunhi Mohamed M.V. Ahmad Kutty
- 2001: Basari Mohamed Kasim
- 2001: Tan Kar Meng
- 2001: Kok Cheng Keong
- 2001: Abdul Rahman Mohd. Nor
- 2001: Khoo Ah Chye
- 2001: Mohd. Razif Abdul Aziz
- 2001: Gopalakrisnan a/l Subramaniam

== See also ==
- Orders, decorations, and medals of the Malaysian states and federal territories#Selangor
- List of post-nominal letters (Selangor)
