= Noorazley Yahya =

Malaysian politician

Yang Berhormat Dato' Noorazley Yahya DIMP MLA

Member of the Selangor State Legislative Assembly for Bukit Melawati
- Incumbent
- Assumed office 12 August 2023
- Preceded by: Juwairiya Zulkifli (PH–PKR)
- Majority: 877 (2023)

Personal details
- Born: Noorazley bin Yahya
- Citizenship: Malaysian
- Party: United Malays National Organisation (UMNO) (–2023); Malaysian United Indigenous Party (BERSATU) (since 2023)
- Other political affiliations: Barisan Nasional (BN) (–2023); Perikatan Nasional (PN) (since 2023)
- Occupation: Politician

Noorazley bin Yahya is a Malaysian politician who has served as Member of the Selangor State Legislative Assembly (MLA) for Bukit Melawati since August 2023. He is a member of the Malaysian United Indigenous Party (BERSATU), a component party of the Perikatan Nasional (PN) coalition and was a member, State Assistant Secretary and State Youth Secretary of Selangor as well as Division Youth Chief of Kuala Selangor of the United Malays National Organisation (UMNO), a component party of the Barisan Nasional (BN) coalition.

== Political career ==
=== Member of the Selangor State Legislative Assembly (since 2023) ===
==== 2023 Selangor state election ====
In the 2023 Selangor state election, Noorazley made his electoral debut after being nominated by PN to contest the Bukit Melawati state seat. Noorazley won the seat and was elected to the Selangor State Legislative Assembly as the Bukit Melawati MLA for the first term after narrowly defeating Thiban Subramaniam of Pakatan Harapan (PH) by a majority of only 877 votes. Due to the small majority, there was initially a plan by PH to challenge by filing an election petition against the results but subsequently PH did not go ahead with the plan.

As the Bukit Melawati MLA, Noorazley voiced opposition to the decision by the Selangor state government of PH and BN of the cancellation of the automatic assessment tax exemption for homeowners in new villages, Malay villages and fishing villages. He described it as a move to burden and trouble the people. He supported his view by adding that most of the people in the villages were of low socioeconomic status and they needed to make an application and appeal if they felt they were eligible for the assessment tax exemption. He also questioned the measurement method of the monthly income as many in the villages were self-employed and did not have a fixed monthly income. In addition, he asked if the move was to punish the people for supporting PN as most of the villages were located in northern Selangor which were politically and electorally dominated by PN.

== Controversies and issues ==
=== Allegations of bankruptcy ===
On 10 May 2024, Noorazley was alleged to have been bankrupt. However, he denied the allegations, clarifying that he was only a guarantor for a company and he had already made payments to the bank.

== Election results ==
Selangor State Legislative Assembly
Year	Constituency	Candidate	Votes	Pct	Opponent(s)	Votes	Pct	Ballots cast	Majority	Turnout
2023	N10 Bukit Melawati	Noorazley Yahya (BERSATU)	14,672	51.54%	Thiban Subramaniam (PKR)	13,795	48.46%	28,467	877	75.00%

== Honours ==
- Pahang
  - Knight Companion of the Order of the Crown of Pahang (DIMP) – Dato' (2016)
