= Azmin Ali =

Malaysian politician

Yang Berhormat Dato' Seri Mohamed Azmin Ali SPMS SSDK SMS MLA
- عزمين علي
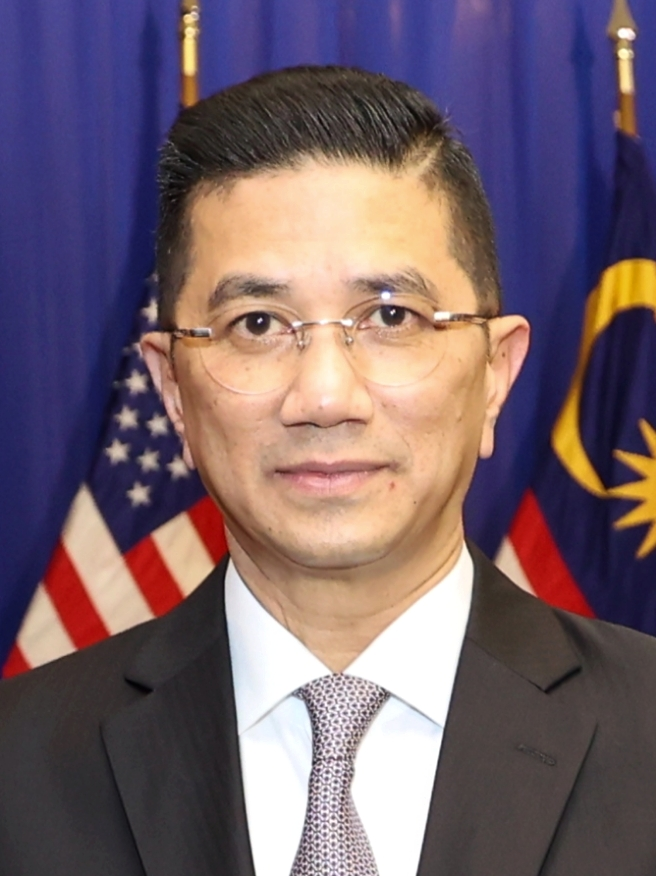
- Azmin in 2022

State Leader of the Opposition of Selangor
- Incumbent
- Assumed office 19 September 2023
- Monarch: Sharafuddin
- Menteri Besar: Amirudin Shari
- Preceded by: Rizam Ismail
- Constituency: Hulu Kelang

15th Menteri Besar of Selangor
- In office 23 September 2014 – 19 June 2018
- Monarch: Sharafuddin
- Preceded by: Khalid Ibrahim
- Succeeded by: Amirudin Shari
- Constituency: Bukit Antarabangsa

2nd Secretary-General of Perikatan Nasional
- In office 9 December 2024 – 1 January 2026
- Deputy: Takiyuddin Hassan
- Chairman: Muhyiddin Yassin
- Preceded by: Hamzah Zainudin
- Succeeded by: Takiyuddin Hassan

4th Secretary-General of the Malaysian United Indigenous Party
- Incumbent
- Assumed office 28 November 2024
- President: Muhyiddin Yassin
- Preceded by: Hamzah Zainudin

4th Deputy President of the People's Justice Party
- In office 28 November 2010 – 24 February 2020
- President: Wan Azizah Wan Ismail (2010–2018); Anwar Ibrahim (2018–2020)
- Preceded by: Syed Husin Ali
- Succeeded by: Rafizi Ramli
Ministerial portfolios
2018–2020	Minister of Economic Affairs
2020–2022	Senior Minister (Economic Cluster)
2020–2022	Minister of International Trade and Industry
Parliamentary offices
Member of the Selangor State Legislative Assembly for Hulu Kelang
Incumbent
Assumed office 12 August 2023
Preceded by	Saari Sungib
Majority	1,671 (2023)
In office 29 November 1999 – 21 March 2004
Preceded by	Fuad Hassan
Succeeded by	Ahmad Bujang
Member of the Malaysian Parliament for Gombak
In office 8 March 2008 – 19 November 2022
Preceded by	Rahman Ismail
Succeeded by	Amirudin Shari
Member of the Selangor State Legislative Assembly for Bukit Antarabangsa
In office 8 March 2008 – 12 August 2023
Preceded by	Azman Wahid
Succeeded by	Mohd Kamri Kamaruddin

Personal details
- Born: 25 August 1964 (age 62) State of Singapore, Malaysia
- Citizenship: Malaysia
- Party: UMNO (1987–1998); KeADILan (1998–2003); PKR (2003–2020); BERSATU (2020–present)
- Other political affiliations: Barisan Nasional (1987–1998); Barisan Alternatif (1998–2004); Pakatan Rakyat (2008–2015); Pakatan Harapan (2015–2020); Perikatan Nasional (2020–present)
- Spouse: Shamshida Tahrin
- Relations: Azwan Ali (brother); Ummi Hafilda Ali (sister)
- Children: 6
- Education: University of Minnesota (BSc, MEd)
- Occupation: Politician
- Website: www.azminali.com

Mohamed Azmin bin Ali (Jawi: محمد عزمين بن علي; born 25 August 1964) is a Malaysian politician who has served as the State Leader of the Opposition of Selangor and Member of the Selangor State Legislative Assembly (MLA) for Hulu Kelang since August 2023. Formerly a member of the Malaysian Parliament for Gombak from 2008 to 2022, Azmin served in the cabinets of Muhyiddin Yassin and Ismail Sabri Yaakob as Senior Minister of the Economic Cluster and Minister of International Trade and Industry from 2020 to 2022. A member of Malaysian United Indigenous Party (BERSATU), which is a component party of Perikatan Nasional (PN) coalition. He also served as MLA for Bukit Antarabangsa from 2008 to 2023 and for Hulu Kelang from 1999 to 2004. He has also served as the 4th Secretary-General of BERSATU since November 2024. He served as the 2nd Secretary-General of PN from December 2024 to his resignation in January 2026, Information Chief of PN and Member of the Supreme Council of BERSATU. He is also widely regarded as a key figure in the 2020–2022 Malaysian political crisis, playing an important role in the fall of the PH federal government in February 2020.

== Early years and education ==
Mohamed Azmin Ali was born on 25 August 1964 in Singapore (then a state of Malaysia) to Ali Omar and Che Tom Yahaya. His father worked for the British Army as a clerk. Shortly after the separation, his family later moved to Kuala Lumpur. He began his education at Gurney Road Primary School, then Setapak High School, and ended it at Jalan Cheras Technical Institute. He studied at the University of Minnesota before earning a degree in economics and mathematics, and later continued his master's degree. During his study, he was actively involved in student politics.

He received Bachelor of Science (BSc) in Economics and Mathematics from the University of Minnesota. He later completed his Master of Education's degree (MEd) from the same institute where he met Shamsidar Taharin, his future wife. While studying, Azmin taught modern and additional mathematics. One of his notable students was Razali Ibrahim, a former deputy minister, when they were in MRSM Terendak. He also attended an executive training programme at the University of Oxford.

== Political career ==
=== Early career ===
In 1987, following advice from the Prime Minister Mahathir Mohamad, Azmin started working for Anwar Ibrahim, who was then a Minister in Mahathir's Barisan Nasional government. Azmin served as Anwar's personal secretary through Anwar's appointment as Deputy Prime Minister in 1993 and until Mahathir sacked Anwar in 1998. Azmin remained close to Anwar following the dismissal and they both became founders of the opposition Parti Keadilan Nasional (KeADILan), which later became the People's Justice Party or Parti Keadilan Rakyat (PKR).

=== State assemblyman and parliamentarian ===
Azmin's political career began after he won the Hulu Kelang state assembly seat in the 1999 election. Keadilan entered the 1999 general elections amidst voter anger over Anwar's dismissal and subsequent imprisonment. Azmin was elected Selangor State Assemblyman for Hulu Kelang. However, he was barred from participating in the 2004 general elections due to his conviction for lying in court during the trial against Anwar. He was unable to defend the seat in the 2004 election after being barred for allegedly lying in court during the trial against Anwar. The High Court and Court of Appeal have since acquitted him.

Azmin returned to national politics in the 2008 general elections, winning the Gombak parliamentary seat and Bukit Antarabangsa state seat in Selangor. Meanwhile, in 2010, he won an internal PKR election for the party's deputy presidency. He replaced Syed Husin, who did not seek re-election. He was reelected as the party's deputy president in 2018 after a close election against Rafizi Ramli.

In the 2013 general elections and 2018 general elections he managed to clinch both seats again. He lost the Gombak seat in the 2022 election. He did not contest the Bukit Antarabangsa state seat in the 2023 Selangor state election and instead contest the Hulu Kelang state seat, which he won.

=== Menteri Besar of Selangor ===
Azmin became the Menteri Besar of Selangor on 23 September 2014, following the resignation of the PKR incumbent Khalid Ibrahim. His ascension to the post followed months of internal political wrangling within the Pakatan Rakyat coalition that led the state. Khalid had been the Menteri Besar since the coalition of PKR, the Democratic Action Party (DAP) and the Pan-Malaysian Islamic Party (PAS) won a majority in the Selangor State Assembly in the 2008 election. In early 2014, PKR's national leader, Anwar Ibrahim, then a federal parliamentarian sought to contest the Selangor State Assembly seat of Kajang in a by-election. The so-called "Kajang Move" would have allowed Anwar to oust Khalid as Menteri Besar with PKR's support. However, after Anwar's conviction for sodomy weeks before the by-election, his wife Wan Azizah Wan Ismail assumed PKR's nomination for the by-election in his place and won the seat. Khalid resigned as Menteri Besar after PKR withdrew its support for his leadership later in the year. PKR, with the DAP's support, nominated Wan Azizah to replace him, but both the Sultan of Selangor (who appoints the Menteri Besar) and the third coalition party, PAS, sought other options. The Sultan requested that each coalition party submit three names for his consideration. PKR and the DAP submitted only Wan Azizah's name, while PAS submitted others. On 22 September, the Sultan announced the appointment of Azmin. He was sworn into office the following morning.

Azmin was the sole recipient of the Order of the Crown of Selangor in Knight Grand Commander class (S.P.M.S) in 2015, which carries the title 'Dato' Seri' in conjunction with the 70th birthday of the Sultan of Selangor Sultan Sharafuddin Idris Shah on 11 December 2015.

Azmin was once again reelected as the Menteri Besar of Selangor in the aftermath of 2018 Malaysian general election after defending his Bukit Antarabangsa state seat. He was sworn into title on the evening of 11 May 2018 at Istana Alam Shah.

=== Minister of Economic Affairs ===
Following the aftermath of the 2018 General Election, Azmin was named as one of the ministers in the newly elected Prime Minister Mahathir Mohamad's cabinet on 18 May 2018. He is to head the newly established Ministry of Economic Affairs. He was sworn in as the Minister of Economic Affairs on 21 May 2018 at Istana Negara. His term ended on 24 February 2020 after the dissolution of cabinet following the resignation of Mahathir Mohamad as Malaysia's Prime Minister per article 43(5) of the Constitution of Malaysia, that allowed the Yang di-Pertuan Agong to revoke the appointment of ministers.

=== Change of allegiance ===
On the morning of 23 February 2020, Azmin held a meeting with several lawmakers from Parti Keadilan Rakyat (PKR) and twenty others at Sheraton Hotel, Petaling, amidst the rumour of a formation of a new coalition at the parliament of Malaysia. He and his faction in PKR, went to the Istana Negara on the evening to seek a meeting with the Yang di-Pertuan Agong, Abdullah of Pahang. Leaders from other five political parties; Bersatu's Muhyiddin Yassin, UMNO's Ahmad Zahid Hamidi, GPS's Abang Johari Openg, Warisan's Shafie Apdal and PAS's Hadi Awang were also in attendance. It was speculated that the leaders were there to brief the Agong about the recent political development; formation of a new coalition government and to declare their support for a new prime minister, effectively blocking PKR's president Anwar Ibrahim from the position. After the meeting, several opposition party leaders, including UMNO's Ismail Sabri Yaakob and PAS' Hadi Awang then joined Azmin's supporters at Sheraton Hotel.

On the next day, 24 February, PKR's general secretary, Saifuddin Nasution Ismail announced in a press conference at the party's headquarters that Azmin and Minister of Housing and Local Government, Zuraida Kamaruddin who is also the vice president of PKR had been sacked from the party. Saifuddin explained that they were expelled due to their actions on 23 October which was against the party's principle regarding the position of prime minister. Azmin later announced that he will be forming an independent bloc at the parliament along with Zuraida and other nine MPs who had decided to exit the party following his expulsion. However, on 28 February 2020, a representative from Bersatu confirmed that Azmin and his faction had joined the party. Azmin said, 'immoral sexual practices' by Anwar caused him to lose faith in the PKR president. Azmin said he doubted the full pardon status granted by the Yang di-Pertuan Agong against Anwar. He added that he was still committed to fighting and eliminating corruption even though he had joined Bersatu. He also denied that he was responsible for the Pakatan Harapan (PH) government's fall in February last year.

He was named as one of the four senior ministers alongside Ismail Sabri Yaakob, Fadillah Yusof and Mohd Radzi Md Jidin in Muhyiddin cabinet on 9 March 2020. The positions were established by Muhyiddin Yassin, the eighth prime minister as a substitute for the deputy prime minister position. Although the four ministers were of equal standings, Azmin was designated by the prime minister to preside over the cabinet's meeting in his absence.

On 30 December 2025, Azmin announced he would be stepping down as secretary-general of Perikatan Nasional (PN) from 1 January 2026. This followed the resignation of PN president Muhyiddin Yassin, with Azmin stating his position was linked to Muhyidden. Azmin simultaneously resigned from his position as Selangor PN liaison chief.

== Controversies and issues ==
=== Victim of hacking ===
In late 2011, Israeli private detective Tamir Mor ordered the mercenary Indian hack-for-hire firm Appin to hack more than 40 targets, including Azmin.

=== Alleged leaked sex tape ===
On 12 June 2019, it was reported that Azmin was filmed in Sandakan, Sabah whilst he was campaigning for the PH's candidate for a by-election, being intimate with another man, his own political aide Haziq Abdul Aziz, in a video circulating on social media. Azmin denied his involvement. Muhammad Haziq Abdul Aziz later confirmed his involvement in the act with the minister and urged authorities to investigate him. Until 16 July 2019, nine people had been arrested by Royal Malaysia Police in the investigation regarding their involvement in making and distribution of the lewd video, including Haziq who had admitted he was the person in the video, and Farhash Wafa Salvador Rizal Mubarak who is PKR Perak state chairman and is also Anwar Ibrahim's political secretary. On 18 July 2019, the Inspector General of Police, Abdul Hamid Bador stated that although the video was authentic, the individual in the video is unidentifiable. He also stated that the group of individuals who made the video were paid thousand of Ringgits, and the video circulation was masterminded by a leader of a political party, with the intention to degrade and defame someone's reputation.

=== Land grab in Selangor ===
While serving as a Selangor State Assembly back-bencher, Azmin highlighted cases of corruption linked to land and forest matters. During his own tenure as Selangor Menteri Besar, Azmin made several land-use decisions that have also been called into question. In particular, Azmin approved the issuance of quarry licences to his political aids. These licences were inside the Bukit Lagong forest reserve, next to the Forest Research Institute Malaysia.

=== Instigation of Sheraton Move ===
Following the political infighting within Pakatan Harapan and Perikatan Nasional Government, Bersatu President Muhyiddin Yassin together with PAS President Abdul Hadi Awang and PKR's defected members led by Azmin Ali formed the Perikatan Nasional and worked alongside UMNO leader Ismail Sabri Yaakob to fill the power vacuum after the resignation of then-Prime Minister Mahathir Mohamad. The alliance produced a simple majority in the Malaysian Government, resulting in political instability that led to the Malaysian political crisis.

=== Voters file suit against Azmin ===
Ten registered voters in the Gombak parliamentary constituency have filed a suit against their parliament member, Mohamed Azmin Ali. The plaintiffs claim that Mohamed Azmin's representations were false and that he only wanted their votes. The ten also claimed that they had relied on those representations to vote for the defendant's 2018 General Election. They seek damages, including aggravated or exemplary damages, interests, costs and other orders deemed fit by the court. "By breaching these representations, the defendant had violated constitutional rights, especially the principles of parliamentary democracy and representative democracy," they said in a statement of claim. The plaintiffs are applying for a declaration that the defendant has breached his fiduciary duties and the duties owed and deceived them.

== Personal life ==
Azmin is married to Shamshida Tahrin, a finance graduate also from the University of Minnesota. The couple have three sons and three daughters. He lives in Ampang.

In addition to an elder brother, Azman Ali, among his younger brothers are television host and celebrity Azwan Ali, and motivator Arpah Ali, while his younger sister is Ummi Hafilda Ali, a prosecution witness in the sodomy trial of jailed former deputy prime minister Anwar Ibrahim.

== Election results ==
Selangor State Legislative Assembly
Year	Constituency	Candidate	Votes	Pct	Opponent(s)	Votes	Pct	Ballots cast	Majority	Turnout
1999	N18 Hulu Kelang	Mohamed Azmin Ali (KeADILan)	9,185	53.32%	Fuad Hassan (UMNO)	8,039	46.67%	17,395	1,146	76.65%
2008	N19 Bukit Antarabangsa	Mohamed Azmin Ali (PKR)	11,731	52.91%	Haslinda Mohd Zerain (UMNO)	10,350	46.68%	22,397	1,381	72.99%
2013	N19 Bukit Antarabangsa	Mohamed Azmin Ali (PKR)	16,502	56.81%	Mohamad Nadzim Ibrahim (UMNO)	12,458	42.89%	29,352	4,044	85.16%
2018	N19 Bukit Antarabangsa	Mohamed Azmin Ali (PKR)	30,892	79.64%	Salwa Yunus (UMNO)	5,380	13.87%	39,057	25,512	84.44%
2018	N19 Bukit Antarabangsa	Mohamed Azmin Ali (PKR)	30,892	79.64%	Syarifah Haslizah Syed Ariffin (PAS)	2,311	5.96%	39,057	25,512	84.44%
2018	N19 Bukit Antarabangsa	Mohamed Azmin Ali (PKR)	30,892	79.64%	Ahmad Kamarudin (PRM)	116	0.30%	39,057	25,512	84.44%
2018	N19 Bukit Antarabangsa	Mohamed Azmin Ali (PKR)	30,892	79.64%	Mohamed Azwan Ali (IND)	90	0.23%	39,057	25,512	84.44%
2023	N18 Hulu Kelang	Mohamed Azmin Ali (BERSATU)	25,597	51.63%	Juwairiya Zulkifli (PKR)	23,980	48.37%	49,844	1,617	69.52%

Parliament of Malaysia
Year	Constituency	Candidate	Votes	Pct	Opponent(s)	Votes	Pct	Ballots cast	Majority	Turnout
2008	P098 Gombak	Mohamed Azmin Ali (PKR)	40,334	53.92%	Said Anuar Said Ahmad (UMNO)	33,467	44.74%	75,619	6,867	76.26%
2013	P098 Gombak	Mohamed Azmin Ali (PKR)	54,827	51.82%	Rahman Ismail (UMNO)	50,093	47.34%	107,162	4,734	86.92%
2013	P098 Gombak	Mohamed Azmin Ali (PKR)	54,827	51.82%	Said Nazar Abu Baker (IND)	474	0.45%	107,162	4,734	86.92%
2018	P098 Gombak	Mohamed Azmin Ali (PKR)	75,113	63.10%	Abdul Rahim Pandak Kamaruddin (UMNO)	26,392	22.17%	119,975	48,721	85.43%
2018	P098 Gombak	Mohamed Azmin Ali (PKR)	75,113	63.10%	Khairil Nizam Khirudin (PAS)	17,537	14.73%	119,975	48,721	85.43%
2022	P098 Gombak	Mohamed Azmin Ali (BERSATU)	59,538	35.99%	Amirudin Shari (PKR)	72,267	43.69%	165,426	12,729	80.01%
2022	P098 Gombak	Mohamed Azmin Ali (BERSATU)	59,538	35.99%	Megat Zulkarnain Omardin (UMNO)	30,723	18.57%	165,426	12,729	80.01%
2022	P098 Gombak	Mohamed Azmin Ali (BERSATU)	59,538	35.99%	Aziz Jamaludin Mohd Tahir (PUTRA)	2,223	1.34%	165,426	12,729	80.01%
2022	P098 Gombak	Mohamed Azmin Ali (BERSATU)	59,538	35.99%	Zulkifli Ahmad (IND)	675	0.41%	165,426	12,729	80.01%

== Honours ==
=== Honours of Malaysia ===
- Selangor
  - Knight Grand Commander of the Order of the Crown of Selangor (SPMS) – Dato' Seri (2015)
  - Companion of the Order of the Crown of Selangor (SMS) (1992)
  - Recipient of the Sultan Sharafuddin Silver Jubilee Medal (2026)
- Kedah
  - Grand Commander of the Order of Loyalty to the Royal House of Kedah (SSDK) – Dato' Seri (2022)

Assembly seats
Preceded by Fuad Hassan	Member of the Selangor State Legislative Assembly for Hulu Kelang; 1999–2004	Succeeded by Ahmad Bujang
Preceded by Azman Wahid	Member of the Selangor State Legislative Assembly for Bukit Antarabangsa; 2008–2023	Succeeded by Mohd Kamri Kamaruddin
Preceded by Saari Sungib	Member of the Selangor State Legislative Assembly for Hulu Kelang; 2023–present	Incumbent
Parliament of Malaysia
Preceded by Rahman Ismail	Member of the Dewan Rakyat for Gombak; 2008–2022	Succeeded by Amirudin Shari
Party political offices
New office	Vice President of the People's Justice Party; 2001–2010	Succeeded by Nurul Izzah Anwar, Tian Chua, Fuziah Salleh, Mansor Othman
Preceded by Syed Husin Ali	Deputy President of the People's Justice Party; 2010–2020	Succeeded by Rafizi Ramli
New office	Information Chief of Perikatan Nasional; 2020–present	Incumbent
New office	Chairman of the International Bureau of the Malaysian United Indigenous Party; 2020–present	Incumbent
Political offices
Preceded by Khalid Ibrahim	Menteri Besar of Selangor; 2014–2018	Succeeded by Amirudin Shari
New ministerial post	Minister of Economic Affairs; 2018–2020	Vacant Title next held by Rafizi Ramli as Minister of Economy
New ministerial post	Senior Minister for the Economic Cluster; 2020–2022	Position abolished
Preceded by Darell Leiking	Minister of International Trade and Industry; 2020–2022	Succeeded by Tengku Zafrul Aziz
Preceded by Rizam Ismail	Leader of the Opposition of Selangor; 2023–present	Incumbent
