= Nayan Ariffin =

Malaysian academic

Yang Berbahagia Tan Sri Dato' Setia Nayan Ariffin PSM SSIS DSPN DSSA JSM

2nd Vice-Chancellor of the Universiti Putra Malaysia
- In office 1 March 1982 – 4 June 1994
- Chancellor: Salahuddin of Selangor; Hamdan Sheikh Tahir
- Preceded by: Mohd Rashdan Baba
- Succeeded by: Syed Jalaludin Syed Salim

Personal details
- Born: 3 June 1934 (age 92) Batu Maung, Penang
- Spouse: Hasmah Othman
- Children: 3 sons and 1 daughter
- Education: Louisiana State University (BSc, MEd); University of Wisconsin–Madison (PhD)

Nayan bin Ariffin is a Malaysian academic administrator. He was the second Vice-Chancellor of Universiti Putra Malaysia, serving from 1 March 1982 until 4 June 1994.

== Education background ==
Nayan Ariffin completed his secondary education from Penang Free School in 1953, then furthered his study at College of Agriculture Malaya, obtained Diploma in Agriculture in 1957. In years between 1957 and 1966, he worked as an agricultural assistant officer in Department of Agriculture, Kedah. In 1969, he finished Bachelor's degree in Agricultural Science from Louisiana State University, followed by Master of Education in Advanced Science in 1970, from the same university. In 1975, he graduated with a PhD from University of Wisconsin–Madison.

== Career ==
Nayan was the Deputy Vice-Chancellor (Students' Affairs) in 1979 to 1982. He later held the post as Vice-Chancellor of UPM from 1982 until 1994. Although he retired in the year 1994, he was appointed as Pro-Chancellor of UPM in 2000.

== Honours ==
=== Honours of Malaysia ===
- Malaysia :
  - Commander of the Order of Loyalty to the Crown of Malaysia (PSM) – Tan Sri (1989)
  - Companion of the Order of Loyalty to the Crown of Malaysia (JSM) (1979)
- Penang :
  - Officer of the Order of the Defender of State (DSPN) – Dato' (1985)
- Selangor :
  - Knight Grand Companion of the Order of Sultan Sharafuddin Idris Shah (SSIS) – Dato' Setia (2010)
  - Knight Companion of the Order of Sultan Salahuddin Abdul Aziz Shah (DSSA) – Dato' (1985)

=== Honorary degrees ===
- Malaysia
  - Doctor of Education from Universiti Putra Malaysia (2002)
  - Emeritus Professor from Universiti Putra Malaysia (2016)

Academic offices
Preceded by Mohd Rashdan Baba	Vice-Chancellor of the Universiti Putra Malaysia; 1982 – 1994	Succeeded by Syed Jalaludin Syed Salim
