= Fuad Hassan (Malaysian politician) =

Malaysian politician (1949 - 2014)

Yang Berbahagia Dato' Fuad Hassan DSSA KMN PJK

Director General of Department of Special Affairs (JASA)
- In office 2009–2014
- Succeeded by: Mohd Puad Zarkashi

Member of the Selangor State Assembly for Hulu Kelang
- In office 21 October 1990 – 29 November 1999
- Preceded by: Rakibah Abdul Manap (BN–UMNO)
- Succeeded by: Mohamed Azmin Ali (BA–keADILan)
- Majority: 6,508 (1990); 10,275 (1995)

Personal details
- Born: 12 November 1952
- Died: 8 December 2014 (aged 62) Hospital Tengku Ampuan Afzan, Kuantan, Pahang
- Resting place: Tanah Perkuburan Islam Ampang, Selangor
- Party: United Malays National Organisation (UMNO) (–2014)
- Other political affiliations: Barisan Nasional (BN) (–2014)
- Relations: Jalaluddin Hassan (brother); Musa Hassan (brother)
- Parent: Hassan Azhari (father)

Fuad bin Hassan (12 November 1952 - 8 December 2014) was a Malaysian politician from the United Malays National Organization Party (UMNO). He was once a member of the Selangor State Legislative Assembly for the Hulu Kelang state assembly representing UMNO.

== Background ==
Fuad was the son of a religious figure who studied al-Quran, namely Hassan Azhari (1928–2018). He was the eldest son, both of his younger siblings are former Inspector-General of Police of Police, Musa Hassan and actor, Jalaluddin Hassan.

He had a degree from National University Malaysia.

== Political and post-political career ==
Fuad was the Hulu Kelang assemblyman for two terms. In the 1999 general election, he lost to the candidate for People Justice Party at the time, Azmin Ali.

Since his defeat, he has retired from the political arena and now focuses on business, recently working to establish a low-cost airline company, Asmara Air Services Sdn. Bhd. He became the Director General of the Department of Special Affairs or JASA of the Ministry of Information.

== Election results ==
Selangor State Legislative Assembly
Year	Constituency	Candidate	Votes	Pct	Opponent(s)	Votes	Pct	Ballots cast	Majority	Turnout
1990	N19 Ulu Kelang	Fuad Hassan (UMNO)	11,585	69.53%	Mohd Fahmi Ibrahim (S46)	5,077	30.47%	16,891	6,508	73.67%
1995	N18 Hulu Kelang	Fuad Hassan (UMNO)	12,481	84.98%	Minhat Sulaiman (S46)	2,206	15.02%	15,049	10,275	71.66%
1999	N18 Hulu Kelang	Fuad Hassan (UMNO)	8,039	46.67%	Mohamed Azmin Ali (keADILan)	9,185	53.32%	17,392	1,146	76.42%

== Honours ==
- Malaysia
  - Officer of the Order of the Defender of the Realm (KMN) (2004)
- Selangor
  - Knight Companion of the Order of Sultan Salahuddin Abdul Aziz Shah (DSSA) – Dato' (1996)
  - Recipient of the Meritorious Service Medal (PJK) (1989)

== Death ==
He died on 8 December 2014 at the age of 65.
