= Nik Mustapha Raja Abdullah =

Malaysian academic

Yang Berbahagia Tan Sri Dato' Nik Mustapha Raja Abdullah PSM PJN DPSK DPMS

Vice-Chancellor of the Asia e University
- In office 1 March 2021 – 8 May 2025
- Chancellor: Syed Hamid Albar
- Preceded by: Hassan Said
- Succeeded by: Noor Raihan Ab Hamid

5th Vice-Chancellor of the Universiti Putra Malaysia
- In office 1 January 2006 – 31 December 2010
- Chancellor: Sharafuddin of Selangor
- Preceded by: Zohadie Bardaie
- Succeeded by: Radin Umar Radin Sohadi

Personal details
- Born: 26 December 1954 (age 71) Machang, Kelantan
- Spouse: Rokiah Mohd Yusof
- Education: University of California, Davis (BEc); Oregon State University (MSc); Oregon State University (PhD)

Nik Mustapha Raja Abdullah is a Malaysian academic administrator. He was the 5th Vice-Chancellor of Universiti Putra Malaysia from 1 January 2006 until 31 December 2010. He also served as Vice-Chancellor of Asia e University from 2021 to 2025.

== Education background ==
Nik Mustapha first finished Diploma in Agriculture from UPM in 1976, followed by Bachelors in Resource Economics from University of California, Davis in 1979. He later continued his study at Oregon State University, obtained Master degree and PhD in field of Agriculture and Resource Economics, in the year 1980 and 1988 respectively.

== Career ==
Nik Mustapha served as Dean of the Faculty of Economics and Management, UPM from 1999 until 2004. He also been appointed as the Deputy Vice-Chancellor (Development) of UPM from June 2004 to December 2005 before held the post as Vice-Chancellor in 2006.

== Honour ==
=== Honour of Malaysia ===
- Malaysia :
  - Commander of the Order of Loyalty to the Crown of Malaysia (PSM) – Tan Sri (2010)
  - Commander of the Order of Meritorious Service (PJN) – Datuk (2007)
- Kelantan :
  - Knight Commander of the Order of the Loyalty to the Crown of Kelantan (DPSK) – Dato' (2007)
- Selangor :
  - Knight Commander of the Order of the Crown of Selangor (DPMS) – Dato' (2006)

=== Honorary degrees ===
- Malaysia
  - Emeritus Professor from Universiti Putra Malaysia (16 September 2019)

Academic offices
Preceded by Zohadie Bardaie	Vice-Chancellor of the Universiti Putra Malaysia; 2006 – 2010	Succeeded by Radin Umar Radin Sohadi
Preceded by Hassan Said	Vice-Chancellor of the Asia e University; 2021 – 2025	Succeeded by Noor Raihan Ab Hamid
