= Hassan Azhari =

Malaysian educator and muslim scholar (1928–2018)

Yang Berbahagia Tan Sri Dato' Hassan Azhari PSM DSSA DMSM JSM KMN PJK
- حسن أزهرى
- Born: 18 August 1928; Syi'ab Amir, Mecca, Kingdom of Hejaz and Nejd (present day Saudi Arabia)
- Died: 6 October 2018 (aged 90); Kuala Lumpur Hospital, Kuala Lumpur, Malaysia
- Resting place: Shah Alam Royal Mausoleum, Selangor, Malaysia
- Education: Madrasah Aljunied Al-Islamiah
- Occupations: Educator; muslim scholar
- Children: 22; including Musa Hassan, Fuad Hassan and Jalaluddin Hassan

Hassan bin Azhari (18 August 1928 – 6 October 2018) was a Malaysian Islamic scholar renowned for his expertise in tarannum, tajwid, and qira'at. He was a prominent figure in the field of al-Quran studies. Hassan gained national recognition through his role as the host of Radio Televisyen Malaysia's (RTM) Muqaddam programme in the 1970s, which educated a generation of Malaysians in Qur'anic recitation. Notably, he was honored with reciting the adhan (call to prayer) during Malaysia's declaration of independence at Stadium Merdeka on 31 August 1957.

Throughout his career, he also led the adhan at the openings of several prominent mosques, including Brunei's Omar Ali Saifuddien Mosque and Sultan Salahuddin Abdul Aziz Mosque. Among his family and students, he was affectionately known as "Abu Ya."

== Early life and education ==
Hassan bin Haji Azhari was born on 18 August 1928 in Syu'ib Amir, a village near the Masjid al-Haram and adjacent to the birthplace of the Prophet Muhammad in Makkah. As the youngest of seven children, he experienced the loss of five siblings during their childhood, including two who were lost to miscarriages.

His first wife, Sahara Abdul Samad, died in April 2004. Of his three wives, he had 22 children in total. Among them are prominent figures like Musa Hassan, the Inspector-General of Police, Fuad Hassan, a former assemblyman who was the director general of the Special Affairs Division (JASA), and Jalaluddin Hassan, an actor. From his marriage to Maimunah Abdul Ghani, his son Mohammad Izzat Hassan has likewise chosen to work in law enforcement. He would later marry Khadijah Yusuf as his third wife.

Hassan was raised in a learned and devout household in Mecca, where he was steeped in the study of the Quran from a young age. He studied under eminent instructors at the Masjid al-Haram, including Sheikh Yasin al-Fadani, in Madrasah Dar Ulum, Mecca. He and his brother Abdul Hakim accompanied his father, who in 1938 accepted an offer from Sultan of Selangor to become a teacher at the Marta' al-Ulum ad-Diniyyah School in Kuala Langat, and stayed in Malaya until he was ten years old (others say eight years old). He studied Arabic for a number of years at Marta' al-Ulum ad-Diniyyah in Malaya, where his father was a teacher. After that, he studied at the al-Hayat al-Mardiyyah Arab School in Kampung Jawa Klang, Selangor.

For two years, Hassan pursued his education in Singapore at Madrasah Aljunied Al-Islamiah. After coming back to Malaya, he continued his studies in Klang's Hishamuddin School, ultimately earning the title of Rabi' Thanawi. He also went to Jubli Klang School and Kuala Langat Malay School. His dual education in Malaya and Mecca made him a foremost authority in Al-Quran teaching in Malaysia, and from the country's early years of independence until the 1990s, his contributions were highly acknowledged.

== Career ==
Hassan received an invitation to judge Tilawah Al-Quran tournaments in Kuala Lumpur and Selangor at many levels, ranging from regional to state to national and worldwide, in 1950. When the Malaysian government established the renowned worldwide Tilawah Al-Quran competition in 1961, he was among the tournament's first judges. His recognition for his skills on a global scale led to offers to judge tournaments in Egypt in 1993 and 1994, Mecca from 1979 to 1993, and other nations including Brunei, Indonesia, Thailand, and Singapore.

In light of Hassan's unique voice, Prime Minister Tunku Abdul Rahman requested him to recite the Muslim call to prayer, known as the "azan," at Stadium Merdeka on 31 August 1957, the day of Malaysia's independence. One week before, the Minister of Education at the time, Abdul Rahman Talib, asked for his permission to lead the call to prayer as a way of thanking Allah for the country's freedom from colonial authority. Apart from his voice, he speaks Arabic fluently, both in formal (fushah) and colloquial ('ammi) forms.

Hassan was an early pioneer in Malaysian Al-Quran teaching, well known for involving kids with the Muqaddam television programme that ran on RTM for eight years beginning in 1979. His approach to teaching started with letter identification and progressed to Qur'anic terms and student recitations, which served as a communal reference point. He recorded 400 radio shows on learning the Qur'an (1960–1998), 442 TV shows (1979–1984), and a number of CDs and VCDs on Berzanji, Tarannum, and Qur'anic studies. One of his recordings was even released in Singapore. Apart from the program and judges, he was also a practicing Qurra' specialist in the Malaysian Qurra' Association, both locally and globally. He has cultivated positive ties with qurra scholars in Indonesia, Singapore, Pakistan, Egypt, Saudi Arabia, and Iraq.

He also delivered the azan during the opening of some well-known mosques, such as the National Mosque in 1967, the Omar Ali Saifuddin Mosque in Bandar Seri Begawan, Brunei, the Sultan Salahuddin Abdul Aziz Shah Mosque in Shah Alam, and the Kapitan Keling Mosque in Penang.

== Death ==
Hassan died on 6 October 2018, at around 5:00 p.m., from lymphoma. He died at Kuala Lumpur Hospital, aged ninety, after spending the previous two weeks under treatment. His son claims that Sultan Sharafuddin of Selangor has ordered his burial to take place the next day at the Shah Alam Royal Mausoleum, Persiaran Kayangan, Section 5, Selangor. Musa, his son, said that his father's wish was to be buried in Mecca, where he was born, but he was unable to do so due to health problems. After being bathed and blessed in the Sultan Salahuddin Abdul Aziz Mosque, Hassan was laid to rest. Sultan Sharafuddin was present during his funeral, along with other authorities including Chief of Police Mazlan Mansor and Menteri Besar Amirudin Shari. The president of the UMNO political party and other members have also sent their sympathies.

== Personal life ==
Hassan Azhari comes from a prominent tradition of Muslim scholars, as evidenced by his genealogy. His father, Haji Azhari bin Abdul Khaliq (born 1880) was a well-known religious figure in Selangor. Haji Abdul Khaliq bin Abdul Rauf, his grandfather, was a well-known academic in Banjarmasin, Indonesia. Hajah Fatima binti Abdul Hakim, his mother, comes from an esteemed family as well; her father, Abdul Hakim, was a renowned scholar who studied extensively at Makkah and was originally from Padang, Indonesia. Hajah Zainab, his spouse, is partially Padang Indonesian and partially Arab.

== Legacy ==
=== Reputation ===
In the tarannum and tajwid groups, Hassan had support from other reciters. Renowned Egyptian reciter Sheikh Mahmoud Khalil Al-Hussary greatly enhanced his popularity by praising his recitation and rigorous devotion to tajwid principles. This recognition, especially given its noticeable Arabic accent, established him as a very accomplished and well-respected Quranic recitationist. His worldwide reputation as one of the foremost authorities on the Qur'an is further evidenced by his appointment as Vice Chairman of the International Qurra' Association, situated in Baghdad, Iraq, in recognition of his hard work.

Hassan has made significant and lasting contributions as a judge for Quranic reciting contests. In 1959, he started off as a district and state judge. By 1960, he had risen to national and international fame. He has judged in several different nations, such as Saudi Arabia, Egypt, the United Arab Emirates, and Indonesia. In addition, during the course of his 50-year career, he oversaw competitions run by notable organisations including Tenaga Nasional, Petronas, the Malaysian Armed Forces, and the Royal Malaysia Police. He also played a vital role in the introduction of Quran memorising contests to Malaysia.

Acknowledging his proficiency, the Malaysian government tasked Hassan with contributing to the creation of the judging criteria for Quranic Recitation, a rule intended to establish precise standards for evaluating attendees of Quranic recitation events. By establishing precise score standards for tajwid, tarannum, fashah, and voice, this law made assessments uniform and equitable across all competition levels. Apart from his function as a judge, he has played a significant role in enlightening the people about the Quran through halaqahs since 1959. He has used customised teaching techniques to account for the different comprehension levels of his pupils.

=== Awards and honours ===
Hassan has made significant contributions to Islam, race, and nation. In particular, he has improved the study of Quran recitation from the perspectives of tajwid, makhraj, and tarannum. Numerous parties have acknowledged and shown gratitude for the effort by bestowing medals or distinctions, announcing numbers, and presenting prizes. Examples of these are:

==== Awards ====
- Anugerah Tokoh Guru Agama Negeri Selangor (1989)
- Anugerah Tokoh Maal Hijrah Wilayah Persekutuan (1990)
- Anugerah Tokoh Maal Hijrah Negeri Selangor (1991)
- Anugerah Khas Malam Seri Angkasa RTM (1997) (Note: Due to his lengthy tenure on RTM's Muqaddam television program in the 1970s, he was popularly considered as "Malaysia's favourite Quran teacher." With himself recording 442 series of al-Quran reading programs, he has spent 40 years teaching students to read the Qur'an aloud at RTM. His lectures place a strong emphasis on giving pupils the right names and encouraging makhraj.)
- Anugerah Kehormat Dalam Pendidikan dan Dakwah Kolej Darul Ehsan Selangor (1999)
- Tokoh Maal Hijrah Kebangsaan pada tahun 1423H (2002)
- Honorary Master's Degree in Teaching al-Quran at the 11th Insaniah University College Convocation Ceremony (2009)
- Anugerah Tokoh Melayu Terbilang (2014)

==== Honours ====
- Malaysia
  - Commander of the Order of Loyalty to the Crown of Malaysia (PSM) – Tan Sri (2009)
  - Companion of the Order of Loyalty to the Crown of Malaysia (JSM) (1993)
  - Officer of the Order of the Defender of the Realm (KMN) (1980)
- Malacca
  - Companion Class I of the Exalted Order of Malacca (DMSM) – Datuk (1978)
- Selangor
  - Knight Companion of the Order of Sultan Salahuddin Abdul Aziz Shah (DSSA) – Dato' (1987)
  - Recipient of the Meritorious Service Medal (PJK) (1964)

== Bibliography ==
- b. Isa Muhammad, K.; b. Ibrahim, L. (2020). "Tan Sri Dato' Haji Hassan Azhari: Sumbangannya Dalam Pengajian Al-Quran Di Malaysia". Jurnal KIAS (in Malay). 10 (1). Universiti Malaya: 57–72.
- Hassan, Abd Rauf; Wan Hamzah, Wan Norainawati (2007). Biografi Dato' Haji Hassan Azhari (in Malay). Department of Islamic Development Malaysia. ISBN 978-983-042-330-2.
