= Musa Hassan =

Malaysian police officer

Yang Berbahagia Tan Sri Dato' Seri Musa Hassan PMN PSM SPMS SJMK SPTS SPMP SSAP SIMP PYGP PNBS DCSM DSSA PGPP KMN AMN PPA PSPNB DUBC PM
- موسى حسن
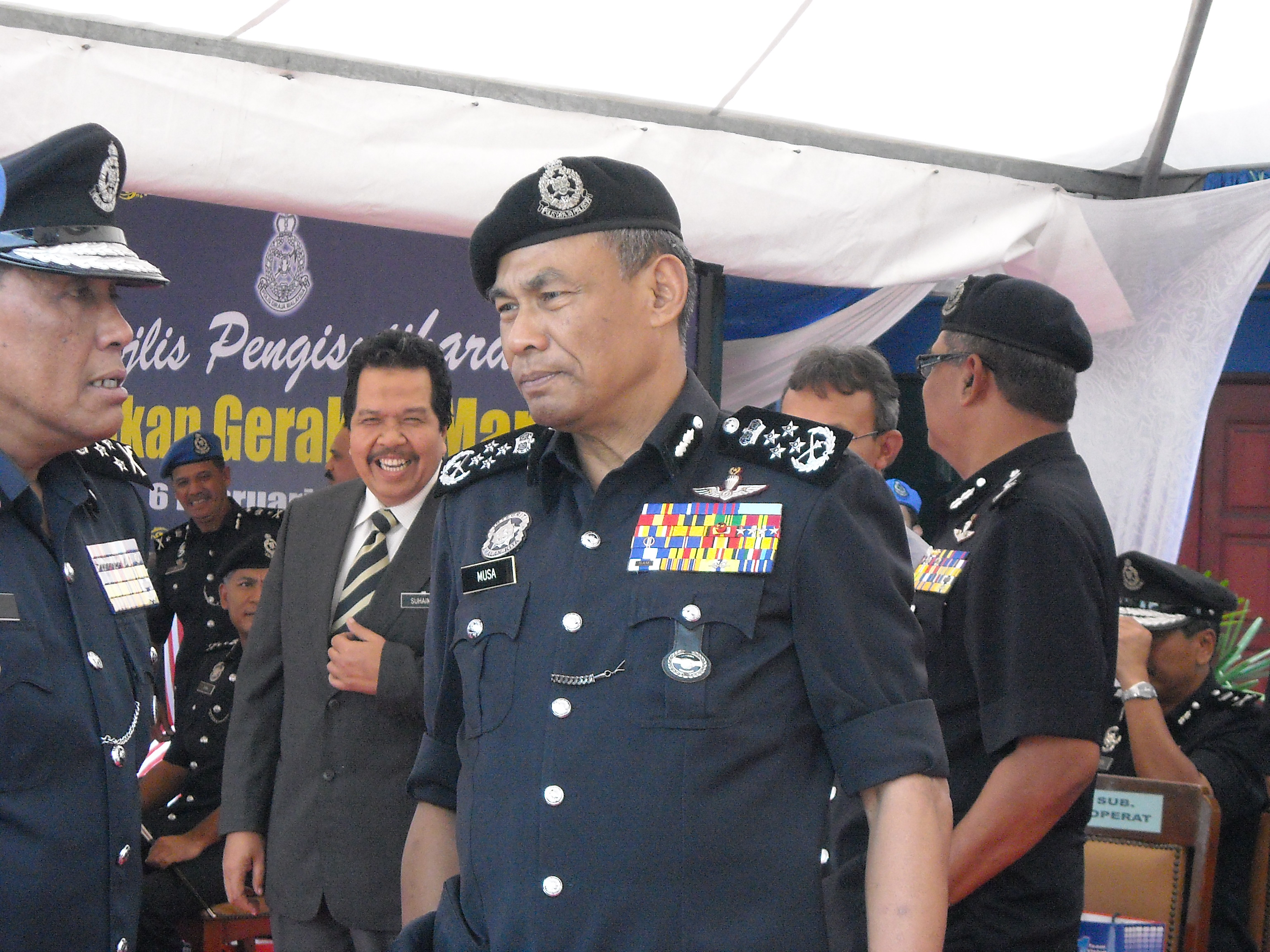

8th Inspector-General of Police (Malaysia)
- In office 12 September 2006 – 12 September 2010
- Monarchs: Sirajuddin; Mizan Zainal Abidin
- Prime Minister: Abdullah Ahmad Badawi; Najib Razak
- Minister: Mohd Radzi Sheikh Ahmad; Syed Hamid Albar; Hishammuddin Hussein
- Preceded by: Mohd Bakri Omar
- Succeeded by: Ismail Omar

Personal details
- Born: 13 September 1951 (age 75) Kuala Lumpur, Selangor, Federation of Malaya (now Malaysia)
- Citizenship: Malaysian
- Spouses: Juriah Ahmad (d. 2019); Elly Afizahwati Abdul Jalil (m. 2013; div. 2023); Qistina Lim (m. 2023)
- Parent: Hassan Azhari (father)
- Education: University of Wales, Aberystwyth
- Occupation: Police officer

Musa bin Hassan (born 13 September 1951) is a retired Malaysian police officer who served as Member of the Board of Directors of the Universiti Sains Islam Malaysia (USIM) from May 2020 to May 2023 and the 8th Inspector-General of Police from September 2006 to September 2010. He was a senior Royal Malaysian Police (PDRM) officer for 40 years.

== Inspector-General of Police ==
He took over the post from Mohd Bakri Omar in September 2006; Hassan had previously worked as Deputy Inspector-General under him.

Soon after he was investigated on allegations of corruption related to the release of three members of illegal betting syndicates, however, Attorney-General Abdul Gani Patail ordered the Anti-Corruption Agency to close the investigations in July 2007 for lack of evidence. Two months later, it was announced that he would receive a two-year extension of his term to 13 September 2008, despite having reached the mandatory retirement age.

In March 2010, Home Minister Datuk Seri Hishammuddin Hussein said that the government will find a replacement for Inspector General of Police Musa Hassan shortly.

Finally, on 13 September 2010 Musa resigned as Inspector-General of Police after serving for more than 3 years. Subsequently, his deputy, Tan Sri Ismail Omar, was promoted to be the new Inspector-General. On 29 April, Musa was appointed Pakatan Rakyat's security advisor.

== Post-retirement ==
After his retirement from the police service, Musa has continued to accept many speaking invitations to discuss topics related to crime trends and integrity in the police force.

In 2019, he received criticism after promoting a satirical post by The Onion which claimed that Osama Bin Laden was uninvolved in the September 11 attacks on twitter, and then doubling down when other Twitter users pointed out the satirical nature of the site, remarking "Wait for The Onion to deny it. If not, it means that America allows the spreading of fake news."

From late 2021 to mid-2022, he was involved with an organization opposing human trafficking and scam syndicates.

== Family ==
Musa Hassan, a Malay of Banjarese descent, is the eldest son of Hassan Azhari (1928–2019), a Koran teacher and famous Qiraati in Malaysia. He received his education in Kuala Lumpur, and has two brothers, Fuad Hassan, a politician (1949–2014), and a younger one, Jalaluddin Hassan (born 1954), an actor. He was from Bukit Bintang Boys' Secondary School.

On 23 September 2023, Musa Hassan tied the knot with Qistina Lim at a ceremony held in Shah Alam. Previously, he married Elly Afizahwati Abdul Jalil for 10 years before she filed for a divorce.

== Honours ==
- Malaysia
  - Commander of the Order of the Defender of the Realm (PMN) – Tan Sri (2007)
  - Commander of the Order of Loyalty to the Crown of Malaysia (PSM) – Tan Sri (2006)
  - Officer of the Order of the Defender of the Realm (KMN) (1996)
  - Member of the Order of the Defender of the Realm (AMN) (1984)
  - Recipient of the General Service Medal (PPA)
  - Recipient of the 13th Yang di-Pertuan Agong Installation Medal
- Royal Malaysia Police
  - Courageous Commander of the Most Gallant Police Order (PGPP) (2005)
  - Recipient of the Presentation of Police Colours Medal
- Kelantan
  - Knight Grand Commander of the Order of the Life of the Crown of Kelantan (SJMK) – Dato' (2007)
  - Recipient of the Order of the Most Distinguished and Most Valiant Warrior (PYGP) (2010)
  - Recipient of the Sultan Ismail Petra Silver Jubilee Medal (2004)
- Malacca
  - Knight Commander of the Exalted Order of Malacca (DCSM) – Datuk Wira (2006)
- Pahang
  - Knight Grand Companion of the Order of Sultan Ahmad Shah of Pahang (SSAP) – Dato' Sri (2005)
  - Knight Grand Companion of the Order of the Crown of Pahang (SIMP) – formerly Dato', now Dato' Indera (2004)
- Perak
  - Knight Grand Commander of the Order of Taming Sari (SPTS) – Dato' Seri Panglima (2008)
- Perlis
  - Knight Grand Commander of the Order of the Crown of Perlis (SPMP) – Dato' Seri (2007)
- Sarawak
  - Knight Commander of the Most Exalted Order of the Star of Sarawak (PNBS) – Dato Sri (2007)
- Selangor
  - Knight Grand Commander of the Order of the Crown of Selangor (SPMS) – Dato' Seri (2006)
  - Knight Companion of the Order of Sultan Salahuddin Abdul Aziz Shah (DSSA) – Dato' (2000)

=== Foreign Honours ===
- Brunei
  - First Class of the Order of Pahlawan Negara Brunei (PSNPB) – Dato Seri Pahlawan (2008)
- Singapore
  - Recipient of the Darjah Utama Bakti Cemerlang (DUBC) (2009)
- Thailand
  - Knight Grand Cross of the Order of the Crown of Thailand (PM) (2011)
