= Syed Jalaludin Syed Salim =

Malaysian academic

Yang Berbahagia Tan Sri Dato' Syed Jalaludin Syed Salim PSM DPMP DSSA JSM

3rd Vice-Chancellor of the Universiti Putra Malaysia
- In office 5 June 1994 – 17 April 2001
- Chancellor: Hamdan Sheikh Tahir
- Preceded by: Nayan Ariffin
- Succeeded by: Zohadie Bardaie

Personal details
- Born: 1944 (age 81–82) Arau, Perlis
- Education: University of the Punjab (DVM); University of London (MPhil); University of London (PhD)

Syed Jalaludin bin Syed Salim is a Malaysian academic and administrator. He served as the third Vice-Chancellor of Universiti Putra Malaysia from 5 June 1994 to 17 April 2001. During his tenure, the university expanded its academic scope beyond agriculture into science and technology, and was renamed Universiti Putra Malaysia in 1997. He has served as the first Chancellor of Taylor’s University since 2011. He was awarded the National Academic Laureate (Tokoh Akademik Negara) in 2007 for his contributions to higher education and research. He currently serves as Chairman of Asia e University and Chairman of the Board of Governors of University College Fairview.

== Education background ==
Syed Jalaludin studied at Stellar Maris School of Kangar, then furthered his secondary education at Saint Xavier School, George Town. He obtained his degree in Veterinary Medicine from the University of the Punjab in 1967, followed by a Master of Philosophy and a Doctor of Philosophy (PhD) from the University of London, in 1969 and 1977 respectively.

== Academic career ==
Syed Jalaludin began his academic career at the University of Malaya as an assistant lecturer from 1969 to 1975. He joined Universiti Putra Malaysia in 1975, where he served as Professor of Animal Nutrition. He was appointed Vice-Chancellor of Universiti Putra Malaysia from 1994 to 2001, where he played a key role in transforming the university into a broader science and technology-focused institution. He has served as the first Chancellor of Taylor’s University since 2011. His academic research focused on animal nutrition and poultry science. Following his tenure as Vice-Chancellor, he continued to contribute to higher education and institutional development in Malaysia. He later served as Pro-Chancellor of Universiti Putra Malaysia from 2021 to 2024.

== Corporate career ==
Syed Jalaludin served as Chairman of Bank Kerjasama Rakyat Malaysia Berhad from 2003 to 2012. He was the founding Chairman of the Halal Industry Development Corporation (HDC) from 2006 to 2016. He has also served as an Independent Non-Executive Director of Petron Malaysia and Esso Malaysia from 2000 to 2014.

== Awards and recognition ==
Syed Jalaludin was awarded the National Academic Laureate (Tokoh Akademik Negara) in 2007 by the Ministry of Higher Education Malaysia. He received the National Science Award (Anugerah Sains Negara) in 1993 for his contributions to scientific research.

== Professional affiliations ==
Syed Jalaludin is a Fellow of the Academy of Sciences Malaysia (ASM) and was elected as an Academician in 1995. He served as President of the Association of Southeast Asian Institutions of Higher Learning (ASAIHL) from 1999 to 2000. He is currently serving as Chairman of the Executive Committee of ASAIHL. He has also served on the Executive Committee and Governing Board of the International Centre for Education in Islamic Finance (INCEIF).

== Honours ==
=== Honours of Malaysia ===
- Malaysia
  - Commander of the Order of Loyalty to the Crown of Malaysia (PSM) – Tan Sri (1998)
  - Companion of the Order of Loyalty to the Crown of Malaysia (JSM) (1991)
- Perlis
  - Knight Commander of the Order of the Crown of Perlis (DPMP) – Dato' (1995)
- Selangor
  - Knight Companion of the Order of Sultan Salahuddin Abdul Aziz Shah (DSSA) – Dato' (1994)

=== Honorary degrees ===
- Malaysia
  - Emeritus Professor from Universiti Putra Malaysia (2006)
  - Doctor of Science from Open University Malaysia (2007)
  - Doctor of Engineering from Universiti Malaysia Perlis (2008)
  - Doctor of Veterinary Medicine from Universiti Malaysia Kelantan (2015)
  - Doctor of Food Security from Universiti Putra Malaysia (2024)
- Japan
  - Doctor, Honoris Causa from Sōka University (2000)
- Thailand
  - Doctor of Agriculture Technology from Thaksin University (2005)
  - Doctor of Arts from Eastern Asia University (2020)
- United Kingdom
  - Doctor of Science from University of Hull (1999)

Academic offices
Preceded by Nayan Ariffin	Vice-Chancellor of the Universiti Putra Malaysia; 1994 – 2001	Succeeded by Zohadie Bardaie
