= Bukit Melawati (state constituency) =

State constituency in Selangor, Malaysia

Bukit Melawati (N10)
Selangor constituency

State constituency
- Legislature: Selangor State Legislative Assembly
MLA
Noorazley Yahya
PN
- Constituency created: 2003
- First contested: 2004
- Last contested: 2023

Demographics
- Electors (2023): 37,956

Bukit Melawati is a state constituency in Selangor, Malaysia, that has been represented in the Selangor State Legislative Assembly since 2004. It has been represented by Noorazley Yahya of Perikatan Nasional (PN) since 2023.

The state constituency was created in the 2003 redistribution and is mandated to return a single member to the Selangor State Legislative Assembly under the first past the post voting system.

== Demographics ==
Ethnic breakdown of Bukit Melawati's electorate as of 2018
1. Malay (60.3%)
2. Indian (21.9%)
3. Chinese (15.4%)
4. Other ethnicities (2.35%)

== History ==
=== Polling districts ===
According to the federal gazette issued on 30 March 2018, the Bukit Melawati constituency is divided into 14 polling districts.

State constituency	Polling Districts	Code	Location
Bukit Melawati (N10）	Kuala Selangor	096/10/01	SMK Seri Tanjong Kuala Selangor
Bukit Melawati (N10）	Bandar Baru	096/10/02	SRA Integrasi Bandar Baru Kuala Selangor
Bukit Melawati (N10）	Asam Jawa	096/10/03	SRA Assam Jawa
Bukit Melawati (N10）	Kampung Kuantan Kelab	096/10/04	SJK (T) Ladang Sungai Buloh
Bukit Melawati (N10）	Kampung Kuantan	096/10/05	SK Sultan Abdul Aziz Kampung Kuantan
Bukit Melawati (N10）	Pasangan	096/10/06	SK Pasangan
Bukit Melawati (N10）	Ladang Sungai Rambai	096/10/07	SJK (T) Selangor River
Bukit Melawati (N10）	Bukit Rotan	096/10/08	SJK (T) Bukit Rotan Baru
Bukit Melawati (N10）	Api-Api	096/10/09	SRA Kampung Api-Api
Bukit Melawati (N10）	Teluk Piai	096/10/10	SRA Bandar Melawati
Bukit Melawati (N10）	Bukit Kuching	096/10/11	SRA Bkt. Kuching
Bukit Melawati (N10）	Pekan Sungai Buluh	096/10/12	SJK (C) Chung Wah Sasaran
Bukit Melawati (N10）	Jeram Utara	096/10/13	SMA Jeram
Bukit Melawati (N10）	Sasaran Jeram	096/10/14	SRA Sungai Buloh

=== Representation history ===
Members of the Legislative Assembly for Bukit Melawati
Assembly	No	Years	Member	Party
Constituency created from Permatang and Ijok
11th	N10	2004-2008	Mohamed Sayuti Said	BN (UMNO)
12th	N10	2008-2013	Muthiah Maria Pillay	PR (PKR)
13th	N10	2013–2018	Jakiran Jacomah	BN (UMNO)
14th	N10	2018–2023	Juwairiya Zulkifli	PH (PKR)
15th	N10	2023–present	Noorazley Yahya	PN (BERSATU)

== Election results ==
Selangor state election, 2023
Party	Candidate	Votes	%	∆%
PN	Noorazley Yahya	14,672	51.54	▲51.54
PH	Thiban Subramaniam	13,795	48.46	▼0.29
Total valid votes		28,467	100.00	
Total rejected ballots		289		
Unreturned ballots		24		
Turnout		28,780	75.82	▼11.26
Registered electors		37,956		
Majority		877	2.95	▼8.94
PN gain from PKR		Swing		?

Selangor state election, 2018
Party	Candidate	Votes	%	∆%
PKR	Juwairiya Zulkifli	11,050	48.75	▲0.67
BN	Jakiran Jacomah	8,355	36.86	▼16.06
PAS	Muhmmad Rashid Muhmmad Kassim	3,261	14.39	▲14.39
Total valid votes		22,666	100.00	
Total rejected ballots		418		
Unreturned ballots		57		
Turnout		23,141	87.08	▼0.48
Registered electors		26,573		
Majority		2,695	11.89	▲6.05
PKR gain from BN		Swing		?

Selangor state election, 2013
Party	Candidate	Votes	%	∆%
BN	Jakiran Jacomah	7,296	52.92	▲4.54
PKR	Manikavasagam Sundaram	6,490	47.08	▼4.54
Total valid votes		13,786	100.00	
Total rejected ballots		294		
Unreturned ballots		33		
Turnout		14,113	87.56	▲12.29
Registered electors		16,118		
Majority		806	5.84	▲2.60
BN gain from PKR		Swing		?
Source(s) "Federal Government Gazette - Notice of Contested Election, State Legislative Assembly for the State of Selangor [P.U. (B) 192/2013]" (PDF). Attorney General's Chambers of Malaysia. 26 April 2013. Archived from the original (PDF) on 29 December 2019. "Federal Government Gazette - Results of Contested Election and Statements of the Poll after the Official Addition of Votes, State Constituencies for the State of Selangor [P.U. (B) 233/2013]" (PDF). Attorney General's Chambers of Malaysia. 22 May 2013. Archived from the original (PDF) on 2 October 2018.

Selangor state election, 2008
Party	Candidate	Votes	%	∆%
PKR	Muthiah Maria Pillay	4,741	51.62	▲51.62
BN	Parthiban Karuppiah	4,444	48.38	▼24.25
Total valid votes		9,185	100.00	
Total rejected ballots		484		
Unreturned ballots		38		
Turnout		9,707	75.27	▲4.43
Registered electors		12,897		
Majority		297	3.24	▼42.02
PKR gain from BN		Swing		?

Selangor state election, 2004
Party	Candidate	Votes	%
BN	Mohamed Sayuti Said	6,228	72.63
PAS	Mohd Norman Toha	2,347	27.37
Total valid votes		8,575	100.00
Total rejected ballots		206	
Unreturned ballots		18	
Turnout		8,799	70.84
Registered electors		12,421	
Majority		3,881	45.26
This was a new constituency created.
