= Bukit Antarabangsa (state constituency) =

State constituency in Selangor, Malaysia

Bukit Antarabangsa (N19)
Selangor constituency

State constituency
- Legislature: Selangor State Legislative Assembly
MLA
Mohd Kamri Kamaruddin
PH
- Constituency created: 2003
- First contested: 2004
- Last contested: 2023

Demographics
- Electors (2023): 69,501

Bukit Antarabangsa is a state constituency in Selangor, Malaysia, that has been represented in the Selangor State Legislative Assembly since 2004. It has been represented by Deputy Speaker Mohd Kamri Kamaruddin of Pakatan Harapan (PH) since 2023.

The state constituency was created in the 2003 redistribution and is mandated to return a single member to the Selangor State Legislative Assembly under the first past the post voting system.

== Demographics ==
Ethnic breakdown of Bukit Antarabangsa's electorate as of 2023
1. Malay (47.1%)
2. Chinese (40.6%)
3. Indian (7.22%)
4. Other ethnicities (5.14%)

== History ==
=== Polling districts ===
According to the gazette issued on 30 March 2018, the Bukit Antarabangsa constituency has a total of 19 polling districts.

State constituency	Polling districts	Code	Location
Bukit Antarabangsa（N19)	Taman Dato Ahmad Razali	099/19/01	Dewan Orang Ramai Taman Dato Ahmad Razali
Bukit Antarabangsa（N19)	Bukit Antarabangsa	099/19/02	SA Rakyat (KAFA Integrasi) Maarif Ad-Diniyah Bukit Antarabangsa
Bukit Antarabangsa（N19)	Ukay Height	099/19/03	Mutiara International Grammar School Foundation Stage
Bukit Antarabangsa（N19)	Ampang Jaya	099/19/04	Dewan Majlis Perbandaran Ampang Jaya Jalan 1 Ampang Jaya
Bukit Antarabangsa（N19)	Taman Perwira	099/19/05	SMK Dato' Ahmad Razali
Bukit Antarabangsa（N19)	Kampung Baharu Ampang 1	099/19/06	SJK (C) On Pong Ampang Selangor
Bukit Antarabangsa（N19)	Kampung Melayu Ampang	099/19/07	SK Ampang
Bukit Antarabangsa（N19)	Pekan Ampang	099/19/08	SJK (T) Pekan Ampang
Bukit Antarabangsa（N19)	Kampung Baharu Ampang 2	099/19/09	SJK (C) On Pong Ampang Selangor
Bukit Antarabangsa（N19)	Kampung Sri Tanjung	099/19/10	Dewan Datuk Tahir Karim Kampung Melayu Ampang
Bukit Antarabangsa（N19)	Pinggiran Ukay	099/19/11	SR Stella Maris (Cawangan Ampang) Bukit Madona
Bukit Antarabangsa（N19)	Kuala Ampang	099/19/12	SK (1) Kuala Ampang; SK (2) Kuala Ampang
Bukit Antarabangsa（N19)	Ukay Perdana	099/19/13	Dewan MPAJ Ukay Perdana
Bukit Antarabangsa（N19)	Kampung Baharu Ampang Kedua	099/19/14	Dewan Komuniti Pekan Ampang
Bukit Antarabangsa（N19)	Kampung Baharu Ampang Pertama	099/19/15	SJK (C) Kampung Baru Ampang
Bukit Antarabangsa（N19)	Bandar Baru Ampang	099/19/16	SMK Bandar Baru Ampang
Bukit Antarabangsa（N19)	Kampung Baharu Ampang Ketiga	099/19/17	SK Taman Nirwana, Ampang
Bukit Antarabangsa（N19)	Taman Dagang	099/19/18	SA Rakyat (KAFA Integrasi) Ar-Rahmaniah Taman Dagang
Bukit Antarabangsa（N19)	Taman Cahaya	099/19/19	SK Taman Nirwana, Ampang

=== Representation history ===
Members of the Legislative Assembly for Bukit Antarabangsa
Assembly	No	Years	Member	Party
Constituency created from Ampang and Pandan
11th	N19	2004-2008	Azman Wahid	BN (UMNO)
12th	N19	2008-2013	Mohamed Azmin Ali	PR (PKR)
13th	N19	2013-2015	Mohamed Azmin Ali	PR (PKR)
13th	N19	2015-2018	Mohamed Azmin Ali	PH (PKR)
14th	N19	2018-2020	Mohamed Azmin Ali	PH (PKR)
14th	N19	2020-2023	Mohamed Azmin Ali	PN (BERSATU)
15th	N19	2023–present	Mohd Kamri Kamaruddin	PH (PKR)

== Election results ==
Selangor state election, 2023
Party	Candidate	Votes	%	∆%
PH	Mohd Kamri Kamaruddin	30,772	65.86	▲65.86
PN	Sasha Lyna Abdul Latif	14,492	31.01	▲31.01
MUDA	Melanie Ting Yi-Hlin	1,462	3.13	▲3.13
Total valid votes		46,726	100.00	
Total rejected ballots		173		
Unreturned ballots		65		
Turnout		46,964	67.57	▼16.87
Registered electors		69,501		
Majority		16,280	34.85	▼20.89
PH hold		Swing		

Selangor state election, 2018
Party	Candidate	Votes	%	∆%
PKR	Mohamed Azmin Ali	30,892	79.64	▲22.66
BN	Salwa Yunus	5,380	13.87	▼29.15
PAS	Sharifah Haslizah Syed Ariffin	2,311	5.96	▲5.96
Parti Rakyat Malaysia	Ahmad Kamarudin	116	0.30	▲0.30
Independent	Mohamed Azwan Ali	90	0.23	▲0.23
Total valid votes		38,789	100.00	
Total rejected ballots		268		
Unreturned ballots		241		
Turnout		39,296	84.44	▼0.72
Registered electors		46,537		
Majority		25,512	65.77	▲51.81
People's Justice Party (Malaysia)) hold		Swing		

Selangor state election, 2013
Party	Candidate	Votes	%	∆%
PKR	Mohamed Azmin Ali	16,502	56.98	▲3.85
BN	Mohamad Nadzim Ibrahim	12,458	43.02	▼3.85
Total valid votes		28,960	100.00	
Total rejected ballots		304		
Unreturned ballots		89		
Turnout		29,353	85.16	▲12.17
Registered electors		34,467		
Majority		4,044	13.96	▲7.70
PKR hold		Swing		
Source(s) "Federal Government Gazette - Notice of Contested Election, State Legislative Assembly for the State of Selangor [P.U. (B) 192/2013]" (PDF). Attorney General's Chambers of Malaysia. 26 April 2013. Archived from the original (PDF) on 29 December 2019. "Federal Government Gazette - Results of Contested Election and Statements of the Poll after the Official Addition of Votes, State Constituencies for the State of Selangor [P.U. (B) 233/2013]" (PDF). Attorney General's Chambers of Malaysia. 22 May 2013. Archived from the original (PDF) on 2 October 2018.

Selangor state election, 2008
Party	Candidate	Votes	%	∆%
PKR	Mohamed Azmin Ali	11,731	53.13	▲21.08
BN	Haslinda Mohd Zerain	10,350	46.87	▼21.08
Total valid votes		22,081	100.00	
Total rejected ballots		224		
Unreturned ballots		92		
Turnout		22,397	72.99	▲0.81
Registered electors		30,687		
Majority		1,381	6.26	▼29.64
PKR gain from BN		Swing		?

Selangor state election, 2004
Party	Candidate	Votes	%
BN	Azman Wahid	14,900	67.95
PKR	Zahir Hassan	7,029	32.05
Total valid votes		21,929	100.00
Total rejected ballots		268	
Unreturned ballots		58	
Turnout		22,255	72.18
Registered electors		30,832	
Majority		7,871	35.90
This was a new constituency created.
