= Juwairiya Zulkifli =

Malaysian politician

Political Secretary of the Office of the President of the People's Justice Party
- Incumbent
- Assumed office 8 April 2024 Serving with Onn Abu Bakar & Sim Tze Tzin & Manivannan Gowindasamy
- President: Anwar Ibrahim
- Senior Political Secretary and Coordinator: Romli Ishak
- Preceded by: Position established

Secretary of the Office of the President of the People's Justice Party
- Incumbent
- Assumed office 8 April 2024
- President: Anwar Ibrahim
- Senior Political Secretary and Coordinator: Romli Ishak
- Preceded by: Position established

Political Secretary to the Menteri Besar of Selangor
- In office 10 February 2021 – 1 September 2023
- Monarch: Sharafuddin
- Menteri Besar: Amirudin Shari
- Preceded by: Borhan Aman Shah
- Succeeded by: A Rahim Ahmad Kasdi; Saifuddin Shafi Muhammad

Member of the Selangor State Legislative Assembly for Bukit Melawati
- In office 9 May 2018 – 12 August 2023
- Preceded by: Jakiran Jacomah (BN–UMNO)
- Succeeded by: Noorazley Yahya (PN–BERSATU)
- Majority: 2,695 (2018)

Personal details
- Born: Juwairiya binti Zulkifli; 6 July 1985 (age 41) Hulu Kelang, Selangor, Malaysia
- Citizenship: Malaysian
- Party: People's Justice Party (PKR)
- Other political affiliations: Pakatan Harapan (PH)
- Education: National University of Malaysia
- Occupation: Politician

Juwairiya binti Zulkifli (born 6 July 1985) is a Malaysian politician who has served as the Political Secretary and Secretary of the Office of the President of the People's Justice Party (PKR) since April 2024. She served as the Political Secretary to the Menteri Besar of Selangor Amirudin Shari from February 2021 to September 2023 and Member of the Selangor State Legislative Assembly (MLA) for Bukit Melawati from May 2018 to August 2023. She is a member of PKR, a component party of the Pakatan Harapan (PH) coalition.

== Election results ==
Selangor State Legislative Assembly
Year	Constituency	Candidate	Votes	Pct	Opponent(s)	Votes	Pct	Ballots cast	Majority	Turnout
2018	N10 Bukit Melawati	Juwairiya Zulkifli (PKR)	11,050	48.75%	Jakiran Jacomah (UMNO)	8,355	36.86%	22,666	2,695	87.09%
2018	N10 Bukit Melawati	Juwairiya Zulkifli (PKR)	11,050	48.75%	Muhmmad Rashid Muhmmad Kassim (PAS)	3,261	14.39%	22,666	2,695	87.09%
2023	N18 Hulu Kelang	Juwairiya Zulkifli (PKR)	23,980	48.37%	Mohamed Azmin Ali (BERSATU)	25,597	51.63%	49,577	1,617	69.14%
