= Shafie Salleh =

Malaysian politician (1946–2019)

Yang Berbahagia Tan Sri Dato' Sri Shafie Salleh PSM SJMK SSAP DSSA SSA KMN AMS
- شافعي صالح
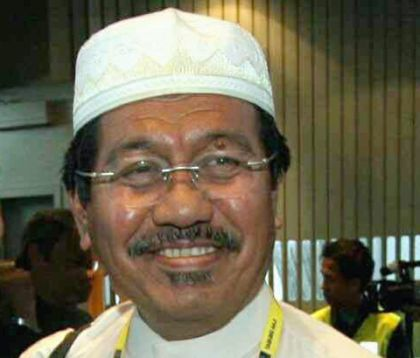

6th Chief Scout of Malaysia
- In office 2005 – 11 September 2019
- Preceded by: Sulaiman Daud
- Succeeded by: Zin Bidin (Acting)

Ministerial roles
- 1995–1999: Parliamentary Secretary of Finance
- 1999–2004: Deputy Minister of Finance
- 2004–2006: Minister of Higher Education

Faction represented in Dewan Rakyat
- 1995–2008: Barisan Nasional

Personal details
- Born: Shafie bin Mohd Salleh; 29 September 1946 Kuala Langat, Selangor, Malayan Union (now Malaysia)
- Died: 11 September 2019 (aged 72) Batu Caves, Selangor, Malaysia
- Resting place: Kampung Giching Muslim Cemetery
- Citizenship: Malaysian
- Party: United Malays National Organisation (UMNO)
- Other political affiliations: Barisan Nasional (BN)
- Spouse: Mizan Adilah Ibrahim
- Education: University of Malaya; Western Michigan University; University of Wales, Swansea
- Occupation: Politician

Shafie bin Mohd Salleh (Jawi: شافعي بن محمد صالح; 29 September 1946 – 11 September 2019) was a Malaysian politician who served as Higher Education Minister of Malaysia. Shafie Salleh was also the Chief Scout of Malaysia.

== Civil servant ==
Shafie served as the Head of Research Centre, National Institute of Public Administration (INTAN) for five years. After that he was appointed the Division Secretary of the Ministry of Human Resources of Malaysia. Later on he was appointed the Undersecretary Research on Policy Analysis in the Malaysian Centre for Development Studies under the Prime Minister department.

== Political career ==
Shafie was also the Member of Parliament for the district of Kuala Langat, Selangor. He was in the UMNO International Relations committee. Later he was appointed the Minister of Higher Education, Deputy Minister of Finance, and also the Parliament Secretary for the Minister of Finance.

During the 55th UMNO General Assembly, Shafie said that he will uphold the aspiration of the Malays. As the Malay special was attacked by the United Chinese School Committees Association of Malaysia Dong Zong. They are pushing the Malay segment on a defence position. Shafie Salleh in a defensive stance, said at the assembly that non-Bumiputras could not enter Universiti Teknologi MARA (UiTM) because it has been allocated to the Malays and it was agreed by all.

== Election results ==
Parliament of Malaysia
Year	Constituency	Candidate	Votes	Pct	Opponent(s)	Votes	Pct	Ballots cast	Majority	Turnout
1995	P101 Kuala Langat	Shafie Mohd Salleh (UMNO)	28,401	75.55%	Tarikh Mohd Jonid (S46)	9,190	24.45%	39,584	19,211	
1999	P101 Kuala Langat	Shafie Mohd Salleh (UMNO)	24,878	59.61%	Saari Sungib (keADILan)	16,858	40.39%	43,296	8,020	75.38%
2004	P112 Kuala Langat	Shafie Mohd Salleh (UMNO)	34,118	72.99%	Zulkifli Noordin (PKR)	12,623	27.01%	48,694	21,495	77.11%

== Honours ==
- Malaysia
  - Commander of the Order of Loyalty to the Crown of Malaysia (PSM) – Tan Sri (2014)
  - Officer of the Order of the Defender of the Realm (KMN) (1993)
- Kelantan
  - Knight Grand Commander of the Order of the Life of the Crown of Kelantan (SJMK) – Dato' (2006)
- Pahang
  - Knight Grand Companion of the Order of Sultan Ahmad Shah of Pahang (SSAP) – Dato' Sri (2005)
- Selangor
  - Knight Companion of the Order of Sultan Salahuddin Abdul Aziz Shah (DSSA) – Dato' (1997)
  - Companion of the Order of Sultan Salahuddin Abdul Aziz Shah (SSA) (1993)
  - Member of the Order of the Crown of Selangor (AMS) (1991)
