= Mohd Shuhaily Mohd Zain =

Malaysian police officer

Yang Berbahagia Dato' Sri Mohd Shuhaily Mohd Zain SSAP DGPN DSAP PSPP PPS PPA PNBB
- محمد شوهيلي محمد زين
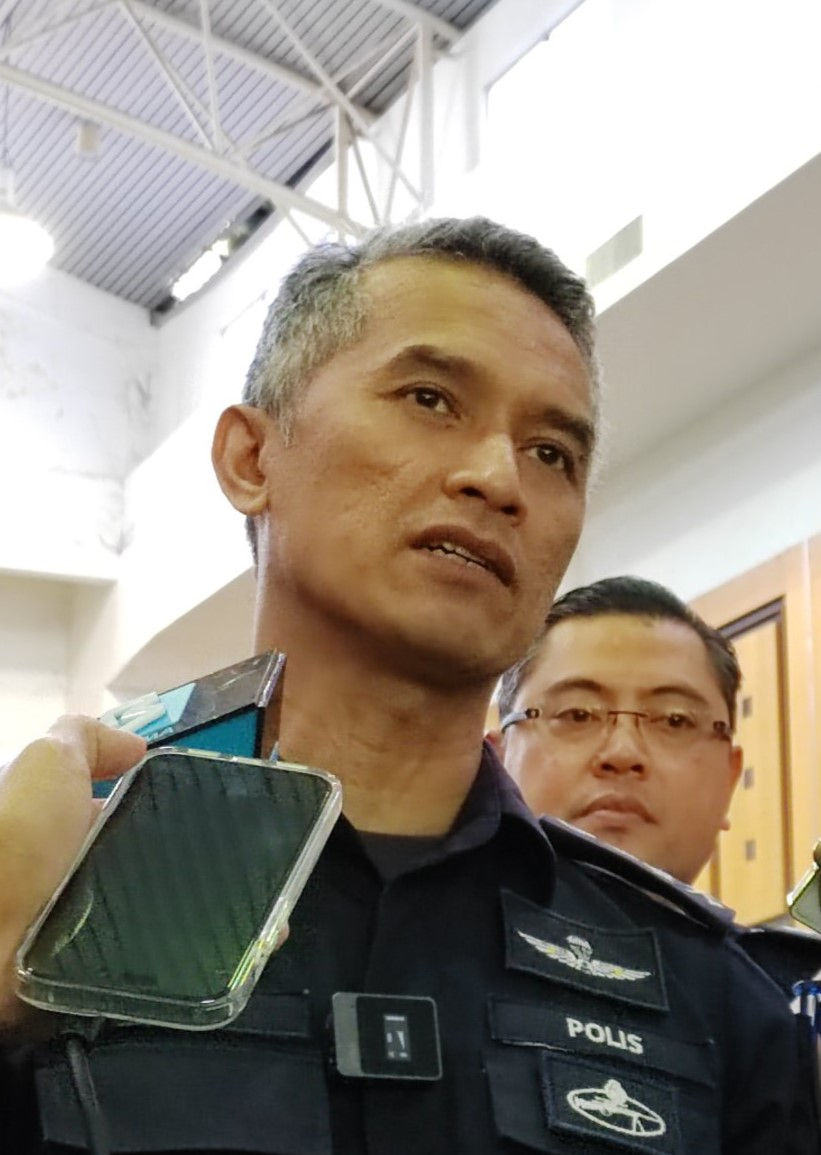
- Mohd Shuhaily in 2024

Director-General of the Malaysian Checkpoints and Borders Agency
- Incumbent
- Assumed office 1 July 2025
- Monarch: Ibrahim
- Prime Minister: Anwar Ibrahim
- Minister: Saifuddin Nasution Ismail
- Preceded by: Hazani Ghazali
- Succeeded by: TBA

Director of the Criminal Investigation Department of Police
- In office 15 August 2023 – 30 June 2025
- Monarchs: Abdullah (2023–2024); Ibrahim (2024–2025)
- Prime Minister: Anwar Ibrahim
- Minister: Saifuddin Nasution Ismail
- Inspector-General: Razarudin Husain
- Preceded by: Ayob Khan Mydin Pitchay
- Succeeded by: M. Kumar S. Muthuvelu

Chief Police of Kuala Lumpur
- In office 15 May 2023 – 15 August 2023
- Prime Minister: Anwar Ibrahim
- Minister: Saifuddin Nasution Ismail
- Preceded by: Abu Samah Mohd Noor
- Succeeded by: Allaudeen Abdul Majid

Chief Police of Penang
- In office 1 July 2021 – 15 May 2023
- Prime Minister: Muhyiddin Yassin (2021); Ismail Sabri Yaakob (2021–2022); Anwar Ibrahim (2022–2023)
- Minister: Hamzah Zainudin (2021–2022); Saifuddin Nasution Ismail (2022–2023)
- Preceded by: Sahabudin Abd Manan
- Succeeded by: Khaw Kok Chin

Personal details
- Born: Mohd Shuhaily bin Mohd Zain; 12 July 1972 (age 54) Kuala Lumpur, Malaysia
- Spouse: Ennie Salina Roseli (m. 2007)
- Education: Methodist Boys' School; International Islamic University Malaysia (BA); Nanyang Technological University (MSc)
- Occupation: Police officer
- Police career
- Allegiance: Malaysia; Yang di-Pertuan Agong
- Branch: Royal Malaysian Police
- Service years: 1997–present
- Rank: Police Commissioner (Note: Although Mohd Shuhaily is currently working at the Malaysian Border Security Agency (MCBA) as its Director-General, he still holds the position of Polis Commissioner from the Royal Malaysian Police (PDRM) because MCBA is under the Ministry of Home Affairs (KDN).)

Mohd Shuhaily bin Mohd Zain (Jawi: محمد شوهيلي بن محمد زين; born 12 July 1972), or nicknamed as Haily, is a Malaysian police officer who has served as the director-general of the Malaysian Checkpoints and Borders Agency (MCBA) since July 2025. He also served as the director of the Criminal Investigation Department of Police from August 2023 until June 2025.

== Early life and education ==
Mohd Shuhaily bin Mohd Zain was born in Kuala Lumpur on 12 July 1972. He is the eldest out of five siblings. His father, Mohd Zain bin Ismail was a traffic policeman in Kuala Lumpur. His father also served in Police Field Force (PPH) during the Second Communist Uprising in Malaysia.

Mohd Shuhaily received his early education at the Methodist Boys' School, Kuala Lumpur. He also received his Bachelor of Arts (BA) in International Relations from the International Islamic University Malaysia (UIAM). He also obtained his Master of Science (MSc) in Strategic Studies from the Nanyang Technological University (NTU).

Mohd Shuhaily also received intensive training from Federal Bureau of Investigation (FBI) academy in Quantico, Virginia early mid 2002 during his rank as Assistant Superintendent of Police (ASP).

== Police career (1997–2025) ==
Mohd Shuhaily began his police career as a Cadet Assistant Superintendent of Police on 1 December 1997. He was later promoted to Special Branch Officer. In 2002, he was appointed as a UN police officer monitor in Kosovo under the United Nations (UN) Interim Administration Mission in Kosovo. The following year, he was assigned as the Attaché RMP at the Embassy of Malaysia, Washington, D.C.

After returning to Malaysia, Mohd Shuhaily served as the Chief of Police of the Perak Tengah District (now Seri Iskandar, Perak), Chief of the Pahang Contingent Special Branch, Principal Assistant Director E1 of the Bukit Aman Special Branch and Deputy Director E1 of the Special Branch, Bukit Aman. In July 2021, he was appointed as Police Chief of Penang, replacing Sahabudin Abd Manan. In mid-May 2023, he replaced Abu Samah Mohd Noor as Police Chief of Kuala Lumpur.

Mohd Shuhaily was assigned to assume duties as Director of the Criminal Investigation Department (CID) since 15 August 2023, replacing Ayob Khan Mydin Pitchay.

== Director-General of AKPS (2025–2026) ==
In July 2025, Mohd Shuhaily was appointed as Director-General of the Malaysian Border Control and Protection Agency, replacing Hazani Ghazali after he served in the PDRM for 38 years.

== Controversies and issues ==
=== KLIA incident and assault charges ===
On September 2026, when an altercation took place at Terminal 1 of the Kuala Lumpur International Airport (KLIA) during a special enforcement operation led by Mohd Shuhaily Mohd Zain. The operation which targeted foreign national runner syndicates near Counter J on Level 5, turned contentious and led to an alleged incident of physical assault involving two Special Branch officers, Mohamad Faiz Saman and Muhammad Ekmal Sofwan Dirman. Following the incident, the two officers lodged official reports, prompting Bukit Aman’s Criminal Investigation Department to launch a swift investigation that involved recording statements from 25 separate witnesses.

After the investigation papers were thoroughly reviewed by the Attorney General’s Chambers (AGC), Mohd Shuhaily was officially brought to the Sepang Magistrates' Court on 21 October 2026, where he faced two separate charges under Section 323 of the Penal Code for voluntarily causing hurt. Represented by a high-profile defense team of nine lawyers where he pleaded not guilty to both charges before majistrate Khairatul Animah Jelani and was granted a total bail of RM3,000 with one surety while the court set on 25 November 2026, for the case mention. This pending criminal trial triggered an immediate legal and service review by the Royal Malaysia Police (PDRM) and the Police Force Commission, as his high-level appointment at AKPS was bound by a strict two-year civil service secondment contract that held royal assent.

On 29 October 2026, Minister of Home Affairs, Saifuddin Nasution Ismail officially announced that the Ministry of Home Affairs had terminated Mohd Shuhaily secondment contract at AKPS effective the previous week, thereby returning him directly to PDRM where his next administrative posting will be determined.

== Personal life ==
Mohd Shuhaily married Ennie Salina Roseli on 23 December 2007.

== Honours ==
=== Honours of Malaysia ===
- Malaysia
  - Recipient of the Loyal Service Medal (PPS) (Note: Serving no less than 18 years.)
  - Recipient of the General Service Medal (PPA) (Note: Serving no less than 10 years.)
  - Recipient of the United Nations Missions Service Medal (PNBB) with "KOSOVO" clasp
- Royal Malaysia Police
  - Loyal Commander of the Most Gallant Police Order (PSPP)
- Pahang
  - Knight Grand Companion of the Order of Sultan Ahmad Shah of Pahang (SSAP) – Dato' Sri (2023)
  - Knight Companion of the Order of Sultan Ahmad Shah of Pahang (DSAP) – Dato' (2017)
- Penang
  - Commander of the Order of the Defender of State (DGPN) – Dato' Seri (2023)

=== Foreign honours ===
- United Nations
  - Recipient of the UNMIK Medal with "3" award numeral

== See also ==
- Murder of Zayn Rayyan
