= NIISe =

Malaysian immigration control system

National Integrated Immigration System
- Other names: NIISe
- Developer: HeiTech Padu Berhad
- Release: 22 September 2025; 11 months ago
- Predecessor: Malaysian Immigration System (MyIMMs)
- Available in: Malay
- Website: www.imi.gov.my

The National Integrated Immigration System (Malay: Sistem Imigresen Bersepadu Nasional; abbreviated as NIISe, pronounced Nice) is a digital immigration ecosystem developed by HeiTech Padu Berhad for the Immigration Department of Malaysia. It replaced the Malaysian Immigration System (MyIMMs), a two decade old legacy immigration management system which became obsolete and full of vulnerabilities. NIISe is coordinated from the National Immigration Command Centre located in three different regions.

MyNIISe
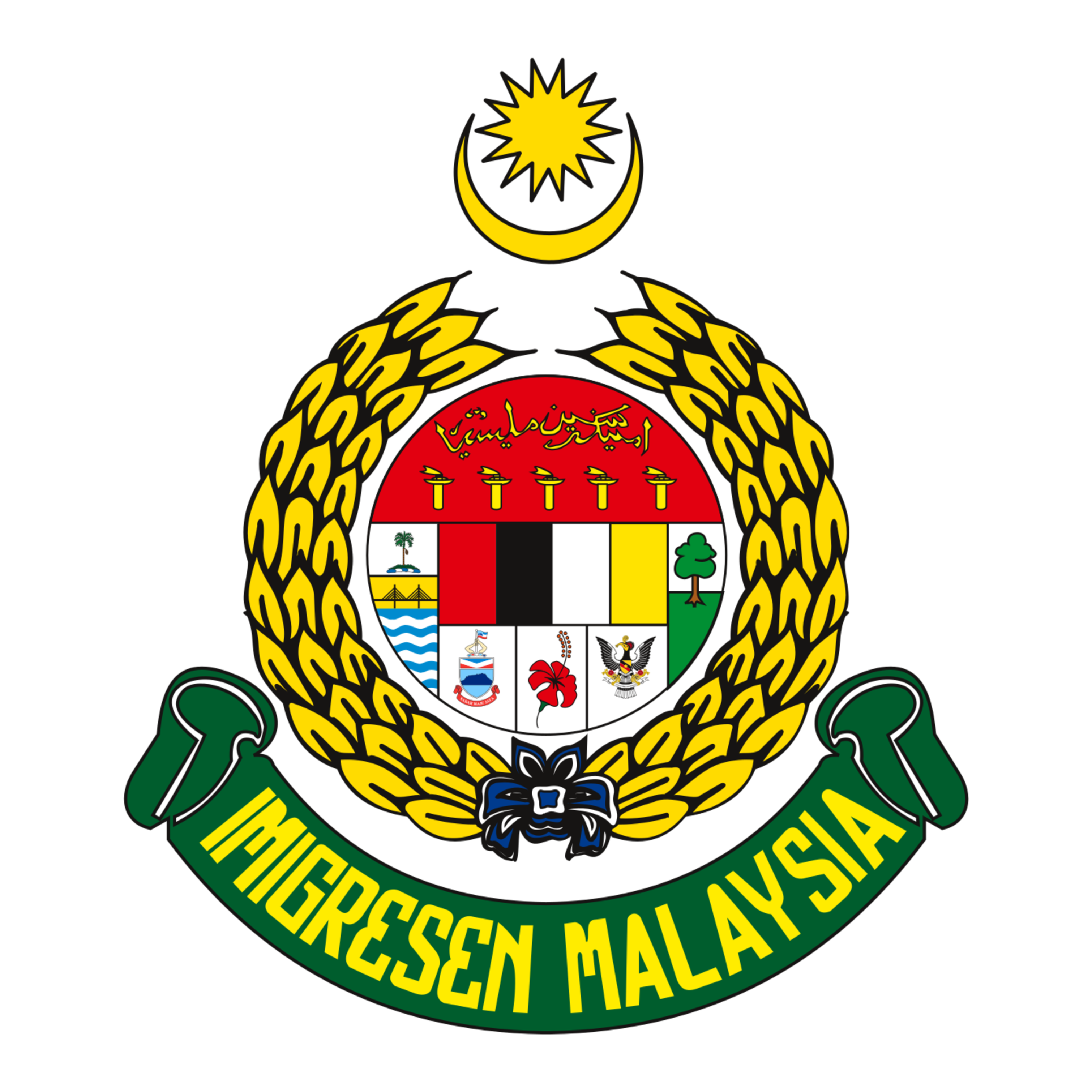
- Developer: HeiTech Padu Berhad
- Release: 22 September 2025; 11 months ago
- Stable release: 1.3.10 / 15 January 2026; 7 months ago
- Operating system: Android 7.0 or later iOS 15.0 or later
- Available in: Malay, English
- Website: www.imi.gov.my

== History ==
Prior to NIISe, Prestariang Berhad signed a concession agreement in 2017 to develop the National Immigration Control System (Malay: Sistem Kawalan Imigresen Nasional – SKIN). However on 10 December 2019, the project was scrapped by the Pakatan Harapan government favouring a more cost effective alternative. Prestariang SKIN later agreed to a RM201.45 million settlement with the government on 24 March 2025. On 25 May 2022, a Iris Corporation Berhad subsidiary secured a Ministry of Home Affairs (KDN) contract worth RM1.12 billion to develop NIISe within a period of 54 months. On 23 May 2023 the contract was extended by 12 months before it was terminated by KDN later on 10 August for material breach of timeline.

On 18 October 2024, the NIISe contract worth RM892.2 million was awarded to HeiTech Padu after a request for proposal also participated by Theta Edge and Datasonic Group. The contract value was subsequently raised by RM157.8 million to RM1.05 billion due to the addition of an Automated Biometric Identification System. By 9 March 2025, data migration works from MyIMMs to the NIISe database was initiated. The process included 20 patch-on systems developed by Bestinet, S5 Systems and Ultra Kirana.

== Modules ==
- Administration
- Immigration control
- Enforcement
- Intelligence
- Forensics
- Stock control
- Revenue collection
- Detention and depot management
- Foreign worker management
- Expatriate service management
- Visa, pass and permit
- Passport and travel documents
- Services
- Identification management
- Security management

== National Immigration Command Centre ==
The National Immigration Command Centre (NICC) serves as the centralised centre for the integrated monitoring, coordination and control of the NIISe system. It is based at the department's headquarters in Putrajaya, with regional centres located in Kota Kinabalu and Kuching.

== Advanced Passenger Screening System ==
Advanced Passenger Screening System (APSS) is an electronic data interchange system that vets and performs risk assessment processes before travellers depart for Malaysia. The system is designed to reduced the amount of Not-To-Land incidents and strengthen national security by assessing passenger profiles from their country of origin including criminal records, and visa status. The APSS utilises the SITA Intelligence and Targeting platform provided by SITA at a cost of RM60 million.

The first phase of APSS was launched on 31 October 2025 and involved 10 airlines including Malaysia Airlines, VietJet Air, Emirates, Scoot and US-Bangla Airlines.

== Digital arrival card ==
The Malaysia Digital Arrival Card (MDAC) is a mandatory digital arrival card for all foreign visitors entering Malaysia.

== eGate ==
The NIISe eGate is the automated border control module of NIISe, it was introduced nationwide in phases and designed to phase out the MyIMMs-integrated eGate.

MyTrip and MyRentas were made available for Malaysians as the first proof of concept for QR code eGate on 1 June 2024, MyTrip was embedded in MySejahtera and utilised in Sultan Abu Bakar Complex (KSAB) while MyRentas was utilised in Sultan Iskandar Building (BSI). Following the successful trial phase, MyTrip and MyRentas were phased out in July 2024 and transitioned to MyBorderPass, the second proof of concept. MyBorderPass is available in BSI, KSAB, Kuala Lumpur International Airport Terminal 1 and 2 (KLIA T1 & T2), and Penang International Airport (PIA).

On 22 September 2025, MyGate QR was deployed in the MyNIISe app and underwent trial in BSI and KSAB car lanes and later motorcycle and pedestrian lanes on October 15. By 1 March 2026, MyNIISe eGates were deployed alongside MyBorderPass eGates in KLIA T1 & T2 and PIA. MyNIISe is expected to be rolled out to Kota Kinabalu International Airport and Kuching International Airport on 15 March 2026.

== See also ==
- Immigration Department of Malaysia
- Malaysian Checkpoints and Borders Agency
