= 2025 Setia City Mall shooting =

Shooting incident in Selangor, Malaysia

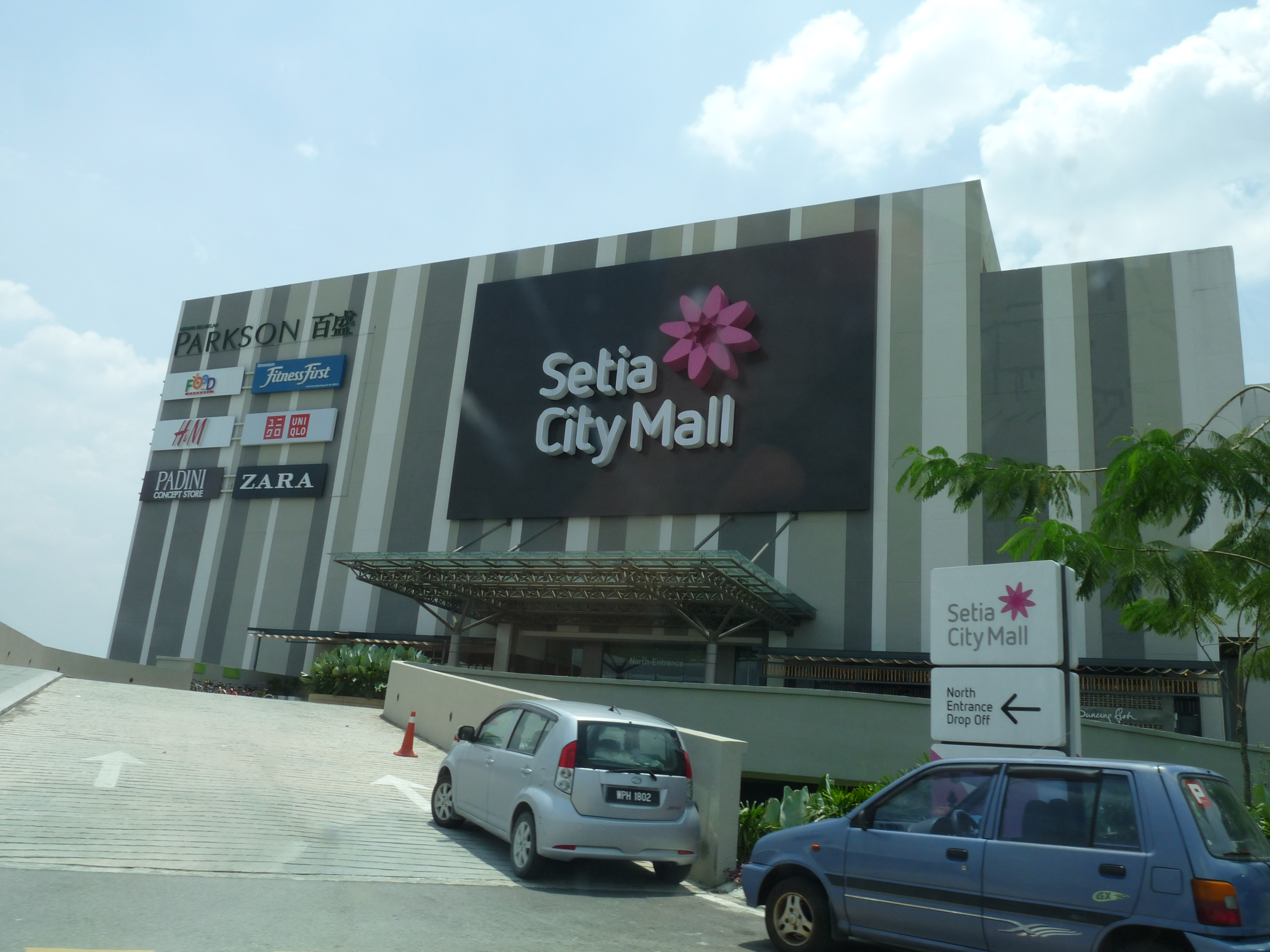
- North entrance of Setia City Mall
- Date: 8 February 2025
- Time: Around 22:50 (MYT)
- Location: Setia City Mall, Shah Alam, Selangor, Malaysia; 3.109776°N 101.459072°E
- Type: Shooting
- Motive: Suspected to be: 1. attempted robbery, 2. fit of anger triggered by janitor's request, 3. influence of drugs
- Perpetrator: Yap Chin Boon ("Ah Boy")
- Outcome: Gunman shot dead at Pulau Ketam on 18 February 2025
- Deaths: 1 (Gunman) (at Pulau Ketam 10 days after the shooting)
- Injuries: 1 (janitor)
- Property damage: Glass window and sliding door shattered, and a wooden advertisement board damaged (at the staircase and elevator lobby of Level P2)

The 2025 Setia City Mall shooting is a shooting incident that occurred at Setia City Mall at around 10:50PM on 8 February 2025. A solo gunman with pistol fired at least 8 shots in the shopping mall, injuring one janitor in the legs and causing mass panic among the shoppers. The shooting caused the shopping mall to be evacuated and stores inside the mall to roll down their shutters. The gunman, later identified as Yap Chin Boon, 35, a Malaysian, also nicknamed "Ah Boy", fled to the carpark of the shopping mall after the shooting. Yap then hijacked a Perodua Ativa SUV carried with a family of six at gunpoint and forced the SUV driver to drive him away from the scene. Yap then dropped off from the SUV at the Pandamaran exit of KESAS Highway and subsequently escaped.

On 18 February 2025 at around 3:00 AM, 10 days after the incident, Yap was shot dead during a shootout with the police at a hotel room in Pulau Ketam when Bukit Aman and Selangor CID officers carried out a raid on him.

== Shooting ==
On 8 February 2025 at around 10PM in the evening, a gunman entered the Setia City Mall located in Shah Alam, Selangor. The gunman approached a janitor on Level P1 of the shopping mall who was storing cleaning equipments at the time. When the janitor ask him to move away his belongings, the gunman, who was suspected to be under the influence of drugs, was angered by the janitor's request and fired 4 shots at the janitor with his pistol, injuring the janitor in his legs and buttocks.

The janitor, a foreign national who is in his 30s, fled into the shopping mall to seek help despite sustaining injuries, while the gunman moved to Level P2 and fired several additional shots at a glass window and a sliding door at the elevator lobby that leads to the carpark area of the shopping mall.

Upon reaching the carpark area, the gunman fired one shot at a passing by car in an attempt to stop it, but to no avail. The gunman then successfully stopped another car, a Perodua Ativa SUV carrying a family of six, by pointing his pistol at the SUV driver and fired another shot at a wall to prove it's a real firearm. The gunman then hijacked the SUV by forcing the driver at gunpoint to drive him away from the shopping mall and onto the highway. He sat at the back seat of the SUV with the driver and his family in front. During the ordeal, the driver begged the gunman to put away his weapon so that his children would not be scared.

The hijacking lasted for around 45 minutes. It ended when the gunman ordered the driver to stop, then took away the car's dashcam memory card, and dropped off near the Pandamaran exit of KESAS Highway to continue his escape on foot.

The shooting prompted mass panic among the shoppers and staff inside the shopping mall, where shoppers were seen on videos running away from the sound of gunfire and exiting the mall with their friends and family. Emergency evacuation announcements were heard broadcasting through the shopping mall's PA system, while individual stores in the mall rolled down their shutters to shelther in place. The janitor, who is the only person injured in the shooting, was sent to the Shah Alam Hospital for treatment and is reported to be at stable condition. The number of shots fired by the gunman was initially reported as at least 8 shots according to Selangor police chief Datuk Hussein Omar Khan, but some media later reported it to be over 10 shots, or 13 shots in total.

== Subsequent events ==
=== Police response and investigation ===
After the incident, initial investigation by the police revealed that the gunman is a Malaysian man in his 30s with fair skin and has 11 past criminal records for robbery and drug-related crimes. The police also said the case is being investigated under Section 3 of the Firearms (Increased Penalties) Act 1971 (discharging a firearm in the commission of a scheduled offence) and Section 307 of the Penal Code (attempt to murder).

Selangor police chief, Datuk Hussein Omar Khan said initial investigation so far revealed that the incident was not connected to a goldsmith robbery as speculated earlier. However, they are also not ruling out the possibility that the suspect was planning to do so. Bukit Aman Narcotic Crime Investigation Department director, Datuk Seri Khaw Kok Chin said his department will identify individuals linked to the gunman to help locate the suspect, however, he also said it was too early to confirm whether the suspect was under the influence of drugs at the time of the incident. Selangor police also believe the gunman is still in Selangor and is confident that he will be apprehended soon.

On the following day of the incident, inspector-general of police, Razarudin Husain said the security measures in shopping malls across the country has been tightened, and auxiliary police and security guards in these places have been told to remain vigilant and on the lookout of suspicious activity. Home minister Saifuddin Nasution has also called for calm and said that the country's security is under control. Saifuddin said he would instruct the IGP to review and enhance the training syllabus of security guards and auxiliary police to ensure that security personnel are better equipped to handle such incidents.

=== Escape and further crimes ===
On the next day of the shooting, 9 February 2025, the gunman tried to hijack another car yet again in Klang but was unsuccessful, as the car driver threw away his car key during the confrontation. Following the failed carjacking attempt, the gunman then intercepted a Grab car and forced the Grab driver to take him from Klang to Melaka with his gun. When they arrived at Seremban, the gunman allowed the Grab driver to refuel at a petrol station, and took this opportunity to take over the car and drive away by himself, leaving the e-hailing driver behind.

He then arrived at Melaka, where he hid in his friend's house for 5 days. In Melaka, he stole a motorcycle and headed back northwards to Banting, where he checked into a budget hotel there. On 15 February 2025 at around 3:00PM, he robbed a lorry repair shop in Banting, where he fired shots into the air to threaten the shop owner and stolen some cash from the shop, and also attempting to steal vehicle parts.

After the robbery at Banting, he continued to escape northwards until Sekinchan of Sabak Bernam district, where he committed housebreaking and stole yet another motorcycle. The gunman continued to flee northwards to Sabak, where he hijacked a lorry and forced the lorry driver to drive him southwards to Sungai Besar. Police sources told Sin Chew Daily that the suspect at this point in time believe he has been spotted by the police, therefore did not continue escaping into the state of Perak from Sabak, but instead travel back to Klang. Later it was confirmed that he was indeed detected by the police in Sabak Bernam on 16 February 2025.

In summary, the gunman committed 5 more crimes after the shooting at Setia City Mall, bringing the total number of crimes he committed to 15, with 9 crimes committed before the Setia City Mall shooting since the middle of 2024. His series of crimes with carjacking, robbery, housebreaking and use of firearms was later described by some media as "GTA-style crime spree".

On 17 February 2025, the gunman travelled to Pulau Ketam and checked into a hotel on the island at around 5:15PM.

=== Pulau Ketam raid ===
During his stay at Pulau Ketam, the gunman went to a restaurant and asked one of the local residents whether there is any boat going into Thailand, citing reason of missing his wife and child who were already in Thailand. When enquired on why not taking a flight to Thailand instead, he replied that his passport was blacklisted. According to the resident, the gunman also bought fried chicken and gave it to the hotel staff to eat.

On 18 February 2025 at around 3:00AM, Criminal Investigation Department (CID) officers from the Bukit Aman and Selangor police raided the hotel. One of the hotel receptionists, who did not expect the raid, heard the commotion and intended to go outside to take a look, but was told by the police to get back into their room. Another hotel worker who heard the sound, choose to stay in her room the whole time instead. The police later ordered all hotel staff and guests to evacuate the hotel immediately.

During the raid, the gunman, who was still awake at the time, fired several shots at the incoming police, prompting the police to return fire, resulting in a shootout. The gunman was then killed by the police in his hotel room.

Following the news of his death, a wanted notice of the gunman started circulating online, revealing the gunman's identity. The gunman was identified as Yap Chin Boon, also nicknamed "Ah Boy", a Malaysian Chinese, born on 6 September 1990, with last known address at Bandar Bukit Tinggi, Klang, and was wanted for firearm offences, attempted murder, and extortion.

Two pistols with bullets, later confirmed as a SIG Sauer and a Retay, were found with the gunman in the hotel room. The police believe they were purchased through local black market roughly a year ago. In a press conference held at Pulau Ketam after the raid, Selangor Police Chief said police investigations shown that the gunman have made preparations to rob a gold shop or another premises in Setia City Mall on the day of the shooting. However, he added that "It appears that something agitated him, causing him to randomly fire his weapon."

The gunman's body was later sent to Tengku Ampuan Rahimah Hospital for post-mortem, in which traces of methamphetamine was found in his body. Police believe his frequent drug use made him became "trigger-happy" when committing his crimes. His body was later retrieved by his family on 18 February 2025 at around 10PM in the evening.

== Yap's notable past crime ==
In September 2020, Yap was sentenced to three years imprisonment and one stroke of caning after pleading guilty to robbing an elderly man at Jalan Besar Kepong, Sentul with a knife. He claimed that the reason he did so was to "cover the expenses of his wife who was about to give birth to their second child". He also further claimed that he has "repented" and he want to "set a good example to his children".

Two years later in December 2022, he was arrested and charged for committing gang robbery with imitation firearm against three individuals at Alor Gajah, Melaka with two other accomplices. However, Yap pleaded not guilty to all four charges. He was allowed bail at RM15,000 for three counts of gang robbery and RM1,000 for one count of unlawful use of imitation firearm.

== Reactions ==
=== Call for more enforcement ===
Following the shooting, one criminologist, Shahul Hamid Abdul Rahim said that police must take their investigation further to uncover the complex web of firearms black market, and to also track down the supplier that sold their weapons to the gunman. He said this was crucial as other criminals may also have access to firearms through the same channels. He also called for tighter enforcement at border checkpoints with neighbouring countries, such as Thailand, where "firearms are sold openly". Therefore, Shahul Hamid said that it's possible the firearms were smuggled in from Thailand. "If drugs can be brought in (from Thailand), then firearms are no exception," he added.

University of Malaya criminologist Dr Haezreena Begum meanwhile claiming that tight laws alone do not deter crime, adding that enforcement and public education are just as crucial. "Education on consequences and enforcement are key", she said. She also commented that Malaysia remains relatively safer than neighbouring countries, but must not be complacent, as Malaysia are now seeing these incidents occurring, such as the KLIA shooting incident happened in April 2024.

Malaysia Shopping Malls Association president Phang Sau Lian, on the suggestion of installing metal detectors at shopping mall, said that mall operators would face challenges to do so, due to the malls' open designs and multiple entry points, therefore requiring high number of metal detectors and trained personnel to operate them. Hence, she said the association as of now strongly recommends intensified patrols by experienced security guards or auxiliary police, who can identify potential threats through observation, body language, and behaviour. Phang also suggested K9 units could be used to detect firearms at shopping malls.

=== Hijacked SUV driver ===
The Perodua Ativa SUV driver, the father of a family of six, who was forced to drive the gunman away from Setia City Mall at gunpoint with his family still onboard felt relief after receiving news of the gunman being shot dead by the police at Pulau Ketam. He thanked the police who have successfully solved the case and told reporters that "I'm relieved that this case is now over. My family and I feel much safer". He also said that his children who experienced the carjacking together with him is still young and don't fully understand what have happened. "Alhamdulillah, everything is now settled," he added.

=== Setia City Mall ===
On the next day of the shooting, Setia City Mall reopened as usual after getting approval from the authorities. The management of the shopping mall in a statement said "the safety and well-being of our shoppers, tenants, and employees is our utmost priority" and is working closely with the authorities. Earlier that day, Datuk Hussein Omar Khan, the Selangor police chief when contacted by Astro Awani said that the suspect is no longer in the mall, therefore the shopping mall is safe and the police will allow the shopping mall to resume operation soon.

=== GSC ===
Due to the shooting and temporary closure of the shopping mall, GSC cinema located inside the mall was forced to close for the rest of the night. GSC said that refunds will be issued to all customers whose their movie screenings were interrupted or cancelled by the incident.
