= Pertanika =

Pertanika may refer to:

- Pertanika Journal of Tropical Agricultural Science
- Pertanika Journal of Science & Technology
- Pertanika Journal of Social Sciences & Humanities
