= Chin Hoong Fong =

Seed scientist

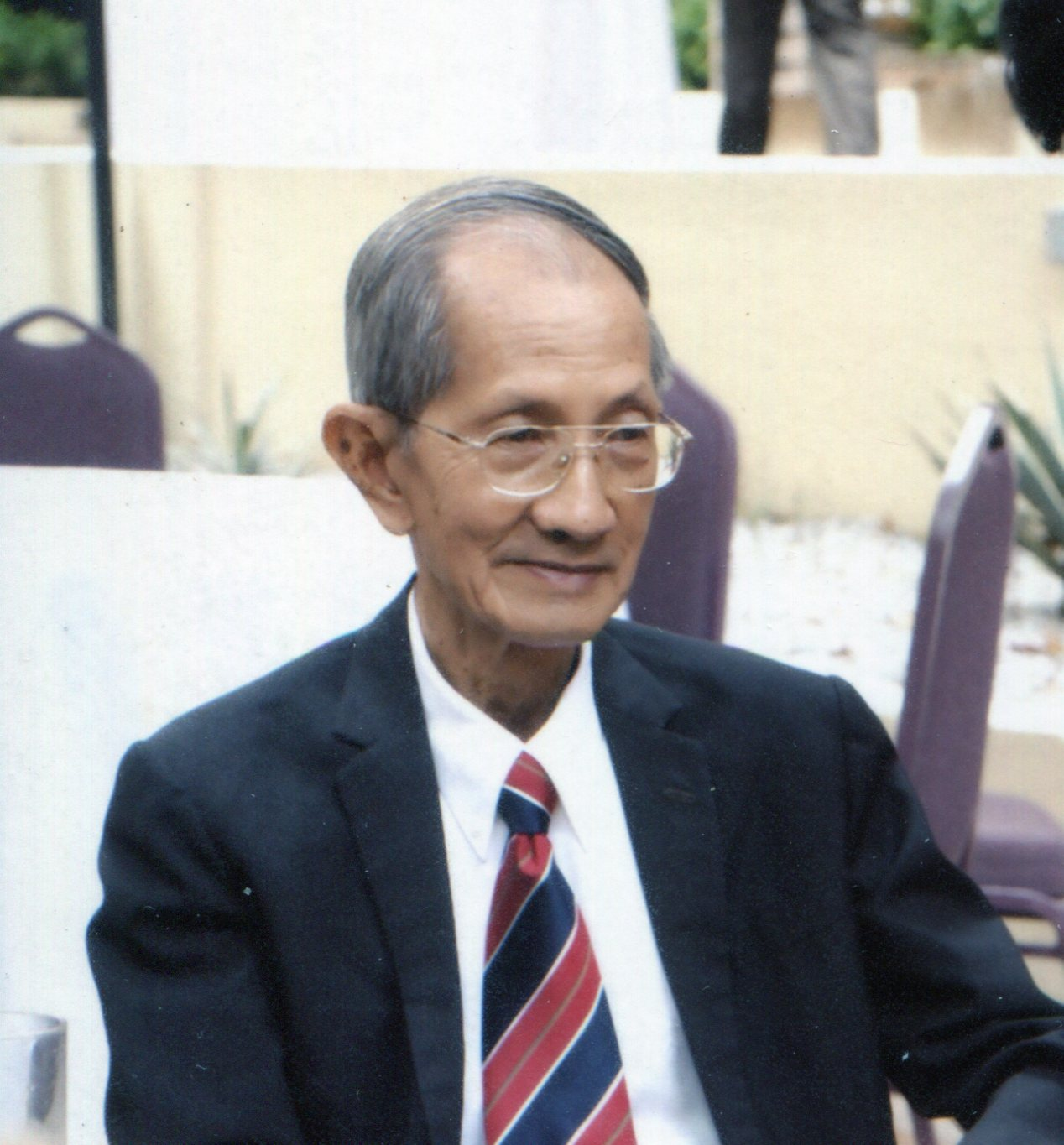
- Born: 22 February 1935
- Died: 19 March 2018 (aged 83)
- Education: University of Melbourne
- Scientific career
- Fields: Seed, Agricultural Science
- Workplaces: Universiti Putra Malaysia

Chin Hoong Fong (22 February 1935 - 19 March 2018) was a seed scientist who pioneered the storage of recalcitrant seeds in the 1970s. He was the Honorary Research Fellow of Bioversity International and Professor Emeritus at the Department of Crop Science at the Universiti Putra Malaysia. He served on the Board of Trustees of the International Board of Plant Genetic Resources (IBPGR), now Bioversity International (1987-1992), the Advisory Committee on Seed Storage, and the Committee of the Svalbard Global Seed Vault, and he chaired the Technical Committee on Seed Storage of the International Seed Testing Association (ISTA).

== Early life and education ==
Chin was brought up in an urban agriculture setting on Jalan Ampang in Kuala Lumpur, Malaysia. His family reared chickens and they had five to six different species of fruit trees, flowering plants and vegetables. He recalled that his general interest in agriculture increased when he joined his school's science society.

Chin started his schooling at age 11 at the Methodist Boys School after World War II.

In 1955, after completing his secondary school education, Chin told his mother that he wanted to further his studies in agricultural sciences at the University of Melbourne in Australia. He did his matriculation at the University High School in Melbourne and then took up agricultural science in the University of Melbourne, graduating with a Bachelor of Agricultural Science in 1960.

== Career ==
In 1961, he started work as a lecturer at the College of Agriculture Serdang, known today as Universiti Putra Malaysia. While working, he obtained his master's degree and PhD in Agricultural Science from the University of Melbourne. In 1973, he returned to serve in UPM. He was appointed associate professor in 1975, Professor in 1981 and Professor Emeritus in 1996 by UPM. In 1994, Chin was awarded the Honorary Degree of Doctor of Agricultural Science by University of Melbourne in recognition of his contributions to the University of Melbourne and international agriculture.

Chin was also one of the founding Editors-in-Chief of Pertanika journal. He was instrumental in the initial establishment of Pertanika and served as Editor-in-Chief of Pertanika from 1983 to 1996.

== Contribution ==
Between 1993 and 2013, he has contributed 1,360 books from his private collection including 13 books written or edited by him.

== Award and recognition ==
- Malaysia :
  - Johan Setia Mahkota Companion of the Order of Loyalty to the Crown of Malaysia (J.S.M.) – 1990
