= Abu Bakar Salleh =

Malaysian scientist

- Born: 29 November 1950 (age 75); Kampung Bagan Tiong, Perak, Malaysia
- Education: University of Western Australia (BSc); University of St. Andrews (PhD)
- Scientific career
- Fields: Enzyme and microbial technology
- Workplaces: Universiti Putra Malaysia

Abu Bakar bin Salleh (born 29 November 1950) is a Malaysian scientist in enzyme and microbial technology at University of Putra Malaysia, where he is a professor at the Faculty of Biotechnology and Biomolecular Science. He is one of the Members of the Committee for the Setting Up of Malaysian Citation Centre.

== Early life and education ==
Abu Bakar was born at Kampung Bagan Tiong, Perak. He attended Sekolah Kebangsaan Bagan Tiang, Perak for his primary education. In 1967, he attended Royal Military College, Sungai Besi, Kuala Lumpur.

In 1975, he was awarded a Bachelor of Science in biochemistry at the University of Western Australia, Australia. In 1979, he was conferred a Doctor of Philosophy in Biochemistry at the University of St. Andrews, Scotland.

== Career ==
Abu Bakar started working as a Tutor at Universiti Pertanian Malaysia (UPM) in 1975. He was appointed as a lectured at Universiti Pertanian Malaysia (UPM) in 1979. He was promoted to associate professor in 1988 and later a professor in biochemistry at Universiti Putra Malaysia in 1994.

He was appointed as the director of Institute of Bioscience in UPM from 2001 to 2004. From 2006 to 2010, Abu Bakar was the deputy Vice Chancellor (Research and Innovation). He is also the first dean of the Faculty of Biotechnology and Biomolecular Science, UPM first established on 1 September 2004.

He was appointed as the Chief Executive Editor for Pertanika journals from 2018 to 2020.

== Awards and honours ==
In 2005, he won the gold medal at the International Des Inventions 2005, Geneva, Switzerland for research project titled Chirazim – A highly enantioselective enzyme for the pharmaceutical and agrochemical industry. At the same exhibition, he won silver medal for MBSofaxTM – New green palm-based fine organics for industry. In 2016, he was awarded Anugerah Tokoh Pekerja (P&P Akademik) in the Majlis Gemilang Putra dan Sambutan Hari Pekerja 2016, Universiti Putra Malaysia.

=== Honours of Malaysia ===
- Selangor :
  - Darjah Kebesaran Dato' Paduka Mahkota Selangor (D.P.M.S) – Dato' (2010)
