= UPM Press =

Malaysian university press

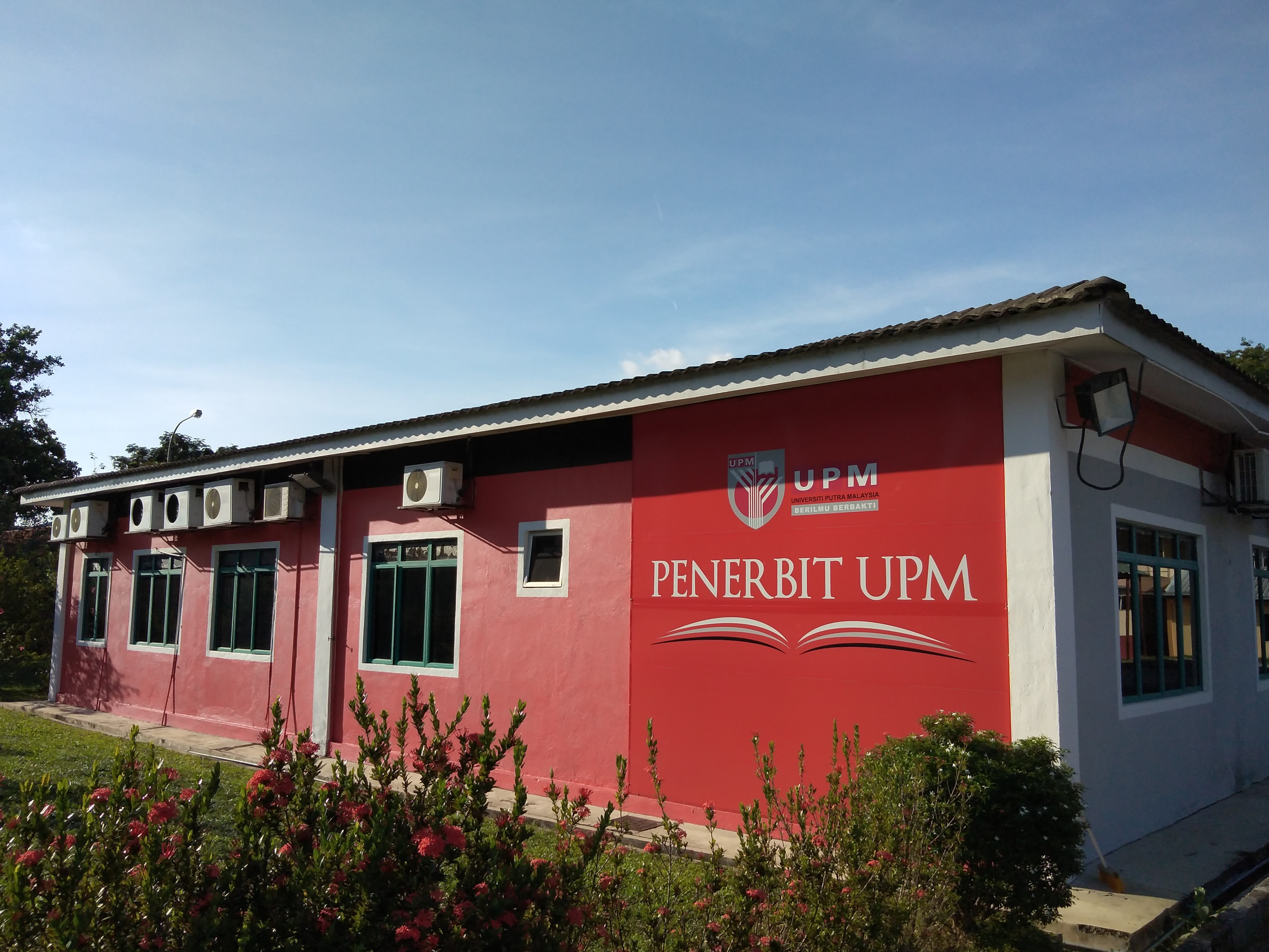
- Parent company: Universiti Putra Malaysia
- Founded: 1977; 48 years ago
- Country of origin: Malaysia
- Headquarters location: Serdang, Selangor
- Key people: Prof. Ir. Ts. Dr. Mohamed Thariq Bin Hameed Sultan (director)
- Publication types: Academic journals, books
- Official website: https://penerbit.upm.edu.my/

UPM Press is the university press of Universiti Putra Malaysia. The press is one of the entities under the Office of Deputy Vice-Chancellor Research and Innovation, University Putra Malaysia. UPM Press operates the UPM Press Bookshop and the publisher for the official academic journal of University Putra Malaysia, the Pertanika journals.

== History ==
The council of Universiti Pertanian Malaysia (former name of Universiti Putra Malaysia) approved the proposal to establish the press during their 15th meeting on 9 June 1977. In the first Committee of Universiti Pertanian Malaysia Press meeting several manuscripts were considered for publications. Two manuscripts were accepted, one of them is an original work and another one is revised edition. The original work titled "Introduction to Veterinary Microbiology" by Prof. M.A. Soltys was at the time in the process for publication. The revised edition was the work of Prof. E.J.H. Corner titled "Wayside Trees of Malaya'.

The book "Introduction to Veterinary Microbiology" was completed when Prof. Emeritus Soltys and the dean of the veterinary school in Saskatchewan, Professor L. Smith, were establishing under CIDA sponsorship, the veterinary faculty at the Universiti Pertanian Malaysia. The book is the first book published by Universiti Pertanian Malaysia Press.

In July 1978, the press published the first issue of Pertanika journal. The first publication was managed by a board of editors as the Subcommittee of Universiti Pertanian Malaysia Press.

In 2015, at the 1Malaysia Book Expo the Deputy Prime Minister Dato’ Seri Dr. Ahmad Zahid Hamidi launched the book Hang Tuah: Catatan Okinawa published by UPM Press and written by Prof. Emeritus Dr. Hashim Musa and Dr. Rohaidah Kamaruddin.

Beginning February 1, 2020, UPM Press was upgraded and became the University Publishing Centre headed by a Director. The first director is Prof. Ir. Ts. Dr. Mohamed Thariq Bin Hameed Sultan.

== UPM Press Bookshop ==
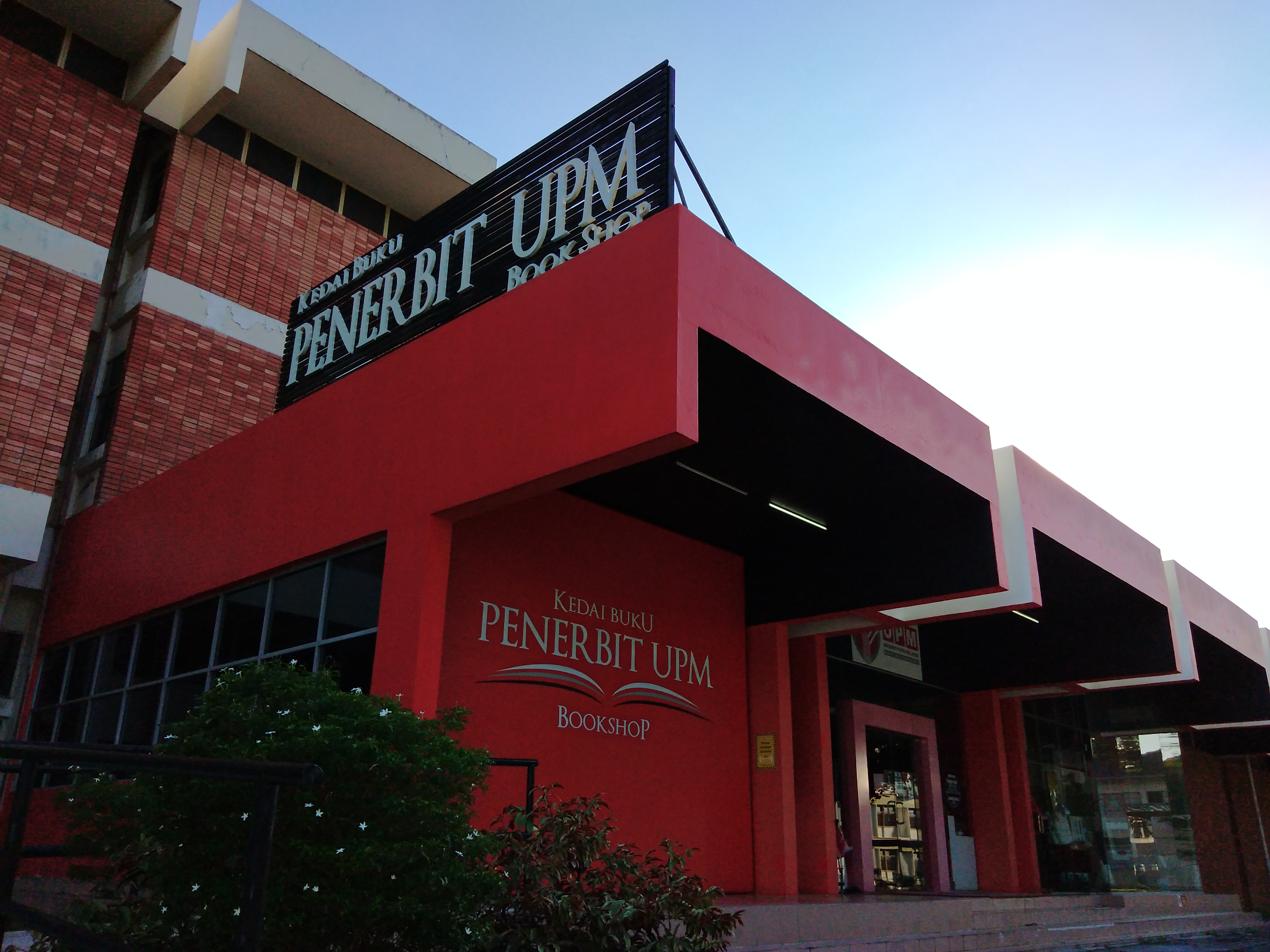
UPM Press Bookshop

The UPM Press Bookshop officially began operation on 27 September 2019 after being inaugurated by Prof. Datin Paduka Dato' Dr. Aini Ideris, Vice Chancellor of UPM.

== Awards and recognitions ==
No.	Title	Awards	Category	Winner
1	Istana Pahang	Anugerah Buku Negara 2018	Reka Bentuk Terbaik	Dato’ Norhasni Zainal Abidin
2	Malay Culinary Herbs	MAPIM-KPT 2016	Reka Bentuk Terbaik	Muhammad Arif Sambudin
3	Hang Tuah: Catatan Okinawa	MAPIM-KPT 2015	Buku Ilmiah Popular	Dr. Rohaidah Ibrahim & Prof. Dr. Hashim Musa
4	Enforcement Operations Public & Private Enforcement Agencies	Anugerah Buku Negara 2018	Buku Umum Terbaik (Kategori Peraturan Awam & Swasta	Dr. Samsudin Yaacob
5	Pokok Enau Potensi dan Pembangunan Produk	Anugerah Buku Negara 2018	Buku Umum Terbaik (Kategori Flaura dan Fauna)	Prof. Dr. Mohd Sapuan Salit, Mohamad Ridzwan Ishak & Zulkiflle Leman
6	Discovery 100 Birds	MAPIM-KPT 2018	Tempat Kedua Reka Bentuk Buku Terbaik	Mazlan Jamali
7	Discovery 100 Birds	Anugerah Buku Negara 2018	Buku Mewah Terbaik	
8	Pengurusan Projek di Tapak Bina	MAPIM – KPT 2018	Tempat Ketiga Editor Naskhah Terbaik (Kemanusiaan dan Sains Sosial	Nor Azila Azmi
9	Introduction to Algebra	ANUGERAH PERSAMA 2018	Hadiah Sanjungan Kategori Karya Asli	Prof. Dato' Dr. Kamel Ariffin Mohd Atan, Dr. Isamiddin S. Rakhimov, Siti Hasana Sapar & Faridah Yunos
10	Pembangunan Kontemporari Orang Asli	Anugerah Buku Negara 2019	Buku Umum Terbaik (Kategori Kemasyarakatan & Komuniti)	Prof. Madya Dr. Sarjit Singh & Roslan Kosnon
11	Pertanika Journal Social Sciences & Humanities	MAPIM-KPT 2018	Anugerah Utama Makalah Sains Sosial Kemanusiaan	
12	Applied Panel Data Analysis	ANUGERAH PERSAMA 2019	Hadiah Sanjungan Kategori Karya Asli	Prof. Dr. Law Siong Hook

== List of active journal published by UPM Press ==
- Pertanika Journal of Science & Technology
- Pertanika Journal of Tropical Agricultural Science
- Pertanika Journal of Social Science & Humanities
- Alam Cipta
- Malaysian Journal of Medicine and Health Sciences
- Journal of Language & Communication
- International Food Research Journal
- Asian Journal of Applied Communication
- Mahawangsa
- International Journal of Economics & Management
- Malaysian Journal of Mathematical Sciences
- Asian Fisheries Science

== See also ==
- List of university presses
