= MCBA =

MCBA may refer to:

- Malaysian Checkpoints and Borders Agency
- Michigan Competing Band Association, Michigan, United States
- Minnesota Center for Book Arts, Minnesota, United States
- Cantonal Museum of Fine Arts (Musée cantonal des beaux-arts), Lausanne, Switzerland
- Municipality of the City of Buenos Aires
- meta-Chloroperoxybenzoic acid
