= Methodist Boys' School, Kuala Lumpur =

- Sekolah Menengah Kebangsaan (L) Methodist, Kuala Lumpur
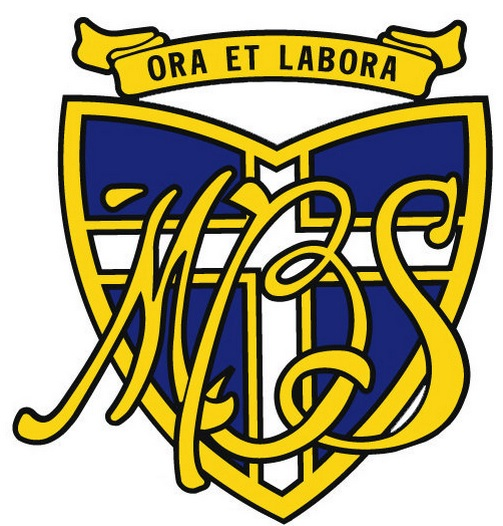

Location
- Jalan Hang Jebat; Bangsar; W.P. Kuala Lumpur, 50150; Malaysia

Information
- School type: Cluster school of excellence High All-boys primary and secondary school
- Motto: Latin: Ora et Labora; English: Pray and Work
- Denomination: Methodist Church
- Established: 1897
- Founder: William T. Kensett
- Status: Operational
- School code: WEB0219
- Principal: Dr. Wee Akina Sia Seng Lee
- Grades: (SK) Standard 1 - 6 (SMK) Form 1 - 6
- Gender: Male: Form 1-5; Co-ed: Form 6
- Campus: Large School campus, at the city centre
- Campus type: Urban
- Colours: Yellow, White and Azure Blue
- Song: Go Forward MBS (Previously: Go Forward)
- Yearbook: The Excelsior
- Affiliation: Malaysia Ministry of Education
- Alumni name: MBS Alumni Association, previously MBSOBA (Methodist Boys' School Old Boys Association)
- Website: www.mbsskl.edu.my

Methodist Boys' School, Kuala Lumpur (Malay: Sekolah Menengah Kebangsaan (L) Methodist, Kuala Lumpur; abbreviated MBS Kuala Lumpur) is a semi-government aided Cluster School of Excellence and High Performance School in Kuala Lumpur, Malaysia. It was founded in July 1897, making it one of the oldest schools in Malaysia. It is known as MBS and its students are known as MBSians. The school is also known as Horley School, a reference to one of its principals, Rev. William E. Horley, who was responsible for changing and giving the school its present name from the previous name of Anglo-Tamil School. The name Horley School has been widely misunderstood as a reference to marble, which is also called Horley in Chinese, a game that was popular amongst its students then. It is noted for its library, which attracts visits from many other schools.

In 2008, Methodist Boys' Secondary School was awarded cluster school status by the Ministry Of Education (MOE). In 2009, Sekolah Menengah Kebangsaan (L) Methodist had 644 male students making the total number of students 644. It has a total of 60 teachers.^{2009}

This school is also known as Marble School among the Petaling Street community. After more than a century and twenty-one years since its establishment by a British medical officer on the warship HMS Orion, Dr William T Kensett, MBSSKL has been awarded a cluster school by the Ministry of Education. MBSSKL is the only school in Kuala Lumpur that was established by a British military officer.

== History ==
MBSSKL was founded by Rev. Dr. William T. Kensett, a Royal Navy medical officer of the battleship HMS Orion. In July 1897, he had the intention of establishing a church and school for the Tamil community in Kuala Lumpur and he left the British Navy. A small wooden shop house was acquired on the corner of Batu Road and Java Street, and the Tamil-dominated school was named the Anglo-Tamil school.

In 1899, Rev. Samuel Abraham became its first headmaster, leading a staff of four teachers. It was then registered as a government-aided school.

Three years later, the MBSSKL proper was founded by Rev. W. E. Horley at the temporary premises of an unused pork market in Malacca Street. The Anglo-Tamil School was absorbed into it, opening up the school to all races.

In 1904, the school decided to move to Petaling Hill (its present site) after several relocations by the sanitary board due to the dilapidated condition of the building. Thus the Anglo-Tamil school was renamed as the Methodist Boys' School Kuala Lumpur by Zaccheus Jeremy Rajan, the name used to this day. Within eight months, sufficient funds were raised to erect a new building. Two new wings were built and playing fields laid.

In 1954, 1st Kuala Lumpur Boys' Brigade Company was established at the school by Mr. Khoo Oon Soo and Mr. R. A. Allen. After the first few years, 1st KL was moved to the Wesley Church just next door to the school, while the school used the church premises as the first meeting place. 1st Kuala Lumpur Boys' Brigade Company is the third oldest group in Malaysia and the first oldest group in Kuala Lumpur. 1st KL is known due to its history in the results of band competitions, foot marches and Talent Time at the national level. 1st KL also produced a collection of President's Men and Founder's Men, as well as two Queen's Men.

In 1958, this school was divided into secondary schools (MBSSKL) and primary schools (MBPSKL) according to the national education policy at that time.

== MBS anthem ==
The School Song was composed in 1948 by former principal, Hugh F. Clancy. The music was harmonised by N.Swan, in the same year. The song was adapted from the originally titled "Go Northwestern Go", written in 1912 by Theodore Van Etten, a member of the Northwestern University Wildcat Marching Band then. The school anthem was sung over Radio Malaya in 1949 by the school choir. Current school song is titled |”Go Forward MBS”

== Former principals ==
Years	Principal
1897-1899	Dr. William Thomas Kensett, M.D.
1899-1901	Rev. Samuel Abraham
1901–1907	Rev. William Edward Horley, M.B.E.
1908–1912	Robert T. McCoy, B.Sc.
1913	Rev. B.J.Baughman, M.A.
1913	Rev. Walter Guy Parker, M.A.
1914	Rev. Preston Littlepage Peach, M.A., M.M.E.
1915	Rev. George F. Pykett
1915–1919	Rev. Preston L. Peach, M.A., M.M.E.
1919–1924	Rev. Walter Guy Parker, M.A.
1924–1926	Thomas William Hinch, O.B.E.
1926–1929	Rev. R.A. Blasdell, B.A. (Acting)
1930–1933	Rev. T.W. Bowmar
1934–1937	Rev. Preston L. Peach, M.A., M.M.E.
1938	Rev. W.A. Schurr, M.A., B.D. (Acting)
1939–1941	Rev. Preston L. Peach, M.A., M.M.E.
1942–1944	None - War Period
1945-1946	S. Kanagaratnam (Acting)
1947–1948	Rev. Preston L. Peach, M.A., M.M.E.
1949–1952	Hugh F. Clancy, B.A.
1950–1951	T.K. Cheong (Acting)
1952–1955	Dr. Ho Seng Ong, Ed.D., M.A., P.R.G.S.
1955–1968	T. Mori, R.C.D.
1969–1978	Tan Hee Heng, R.C.D.
1979–1985	Yong Chee Seng
1986–1995	Loh Kung Sing
1995–1996	Hew Yoon Yew
1997–2004	Loo Wan Yong
2004–2005	Moey Yoke Lai
2005-2017	Wong Chee Kheon
2017-2020	Brendan Ravi Chandran
2020-2026	John Toh Kok Min
2026–present	Dr. Wee Akina Sia Seng Lee

== Co-curricular ==
=== Uniform bodies ===
There are 10 uniformed bodies in the school as of 2023. Some examples are:

==== 10th Kuala Lumpur Air Scout Group ====
10th Kuala Lumpur Air Scouts was established in 1915 and absorbed 15th Kuala Lumpur Scouts Troop after the second World War.

==== 1st Kuala Lumpur Boys' Brigade Company ====
Founded by Mr. Khoo Onn Soo and Mr. R. A. Allen under the sponsorship of Wesley Methodist Church, Kuala Lumpur in 1954. 1st Kuala Lumpur Boys Brigade was the third company to be established in Malaysia and the first company to be established in Kuala Lumpur.

==== Kuala Lumpur No.6 Ambulance Cadet Division of St. John Ambulance Malaysia ====
KLN6ACD is a division under St. John Ambulance of Malaysia, part of an international voluntary service organisation dedicated to training and providing first aid skills. The division has had numerous achievements in competitions at the state and national levels, and continues to be a major contributor in voluntary first aid service within the school as well as the public through duties coordinated by the State Officers.

=== School Uniform ===
Badge	Metal Badge with Pin
Shirt	Standard Secondary School White Short Sleeve Shirt
Shirt	Standard Secondary School White Short Sleeve Shirt
Slacks	Standard Secondary School Olive Green Slacks Without Pleats
Tie	Repeating pattern of M.B.S. Crest in Striped Pattern, Black/Dark Blue Background
Shoes & Socks	Black Shoes with Black Socks /or/ White Shoes with White Socks
Class Monitors Board (Lembaga Ketua Kelas)	Additional Plastic Tag on top of Standard Uniform, for Class Monitor and Asst.

Form	Wooven Name Tag (Colour Rotates Yearly) As of 2025:
1	Yellow Cloth with Black Lettering
2	Orange Cloth with Black Lettering
3	Brown Cloth with Black Lettering
4	Purple Cloth with Black Lettering
5	White Cloth with Black Lettering

Students' Boards & Service Units
Name	Year Est.		Uniform						
Name	Year Est.	Position	School Badge	Button-up Shirt	Slacks & Belt	Neck Tie	Blazer	Name Tag	Shoes & Socks
Prefectorial Board Lembaga Pengawas	1931	Probationary Prefect	Standard School Badge	Short Sleeved White Shirt	Standard Olive Green Long Slacks + Canvas Belt	Plain Navy Blue Tie 'Prefect's Tie'	None	Standard Sewn on Name Tag	Standard Black / White School Shoes & Socks
Prefectorial Board Lembaga Pengawas	1931	Junior Prefect	"JUNIOR PREFECT" Yellow Banner	Short Sleeved White Shirt	Standard Olive Green Long Slacks + Canvas Belt	Plain Navy Blue Tie 'Prefect's Tie'	None	Standard Sewn on Name Tag	Standard Black / White School Shoes & Socks
Prefectorial Board Lembaga Pengawas	1931	Senior Prefect (Informal)	"PREFECT" Navy Blue Banner	Short Sleeved White Shirt	Pleatless Navy Blue Long Slacks + Black Leather Belt	Plain Navy Blue Tie 'Prefect's Tie'	-	Plastic, Yellow Background + Black Lettering	Black Leather Shoes + Black Socks (Above Ankles)
Prefectorial Board Lembaga Pengawas	1931	Senior Prefect (Formal)	"PREFECT" Navy Blue Banner	Long Sleeved White Shirt	Pleatless Navy Blue Long Slacks + Black Leather Belt	Plain Navy Blue Tie 'Prefect's Tie'	Navy Blue Blazer + Embroidered Badge	Plastic, Yellow Background + Black Lettering	Black Leather Shoes + Black Socks (Above Ankles)
Prefectorial Board Lembaga Pengawas	1931	Executive Committee (EXCO)	Same with Seniors' Uniform + Additional Position School Badge: Prefects Badge with Blue Banner: "POSITION"						
Board of Students' Librarians (BOSL) Lembaga Pengawas Pusat Sumber (PPS)	1957 /or/ 1962	Probationary Librarian	Standard School Badge + White Probationary Tag, "PROBATIONARY BOSL"	Short Sleeved White Shirt	Standard Olive Green Long Slacks + Canvas Belt	Standard School Tie (Repeating Pattern of MBS Crest)	None	Standard Sewn on Name Tag	Standard Black / White School Shoes & Socks
Board of Students' Librarians (BOSL) Lembaga Pengawas Pusat Sumber (PPS)	1957 /or/ 1962	Senior Librarian (Informal)	"LIBRARIAN" Yellow Banner & Light Blue Crest Background (Instead of Azure Blue)	Short Sleeved Light Blue Shirt	Pleatless White Long Slacks	Standard School Tie (Repeating Pattern of MBS Crest)	-	Plastic, White Background + Black Lettering	Black Leather Shoes + Black Socks (Above Ankles)
Board of Students' Librarians (BOSL) Lembaga Pengawas Pusat Sumber (PPS)	1957 /or/ 1962	Senior Librarian (Formal)	"LIBRARIAN" Yellow Banner & Light Blue Crest Background (Instead of Azure Blue)	Long Sleeved Light Blue Shirt	Pleatless White Long Slacks	Standard School Tie (Repeating Pattern of MBS Crest)	Navy Blue Blazer + Embroidered Badge	Plastic, White Background + Black Lettering	Black Leather Shoes + Black Socks (Above Ankles)
Board of Students' Librarians (BOSL) Lembaga Pengawas Pusat Sumber (PPS)	1957 /or/ 1962	Executive Committee (EXCO)	Same with Seniors' Uniform + Additional Position Tag: Metal, Blue Background with Gold Lettering (Badge on Left Corner) : "CENTENARY LIBRARY","POSITION"						Black Leather Shoes + Black Socks (Above Ankles)
Sportsmen Board Lembaga Olahragawan	1970's	No Probation							
Sportsmen Board Lembaga Olahragawan	1970's	Senior Sportmen (Informal)	Silver Pentadecagon with 120 straight lines (8 lines between each vertices)	Short Sleeved White Shirt	Pleatless White Long Slacks	Standard School Tie (Repeating Pattern of MBS Crest)	-	Metal, Gold Background + Black Lettering	Black Leather Shoes + Black Socks (Above Ankles)
Sportsmen Board Lembaga Olahragawan	1970's	Senior Sportmen (Formal)	Silver Pentadecagon with 120 straight lines (8 lines between each vertices)	Long Sleeved White Shirt	Pleatless White Long Slacks	Standard School Tie (Repeating Pattern of MBS Crest)	Black Blazer + Embroidered Badge	Metal, Gold Background + Black Lettering	Black Leather Shoes + Black Socks (Above Ankles)
Sportsmen Board Lembaga Olahragawan	1970's	Executive Committee (EXCO)	Same with Seniors' Uniform + Additional Position Tag: Metal, Gold Background with Black Lettering: "EXECUTIVE COMMITTEE", "POSITION"						Black Leather Shoes + Black Socks (Above Ankles)
Information Technology Brigade (ITB) Briged IT / Lembaga ITB	2005	Probationary ITB Member	Standard School Badge + Black Probationary Tag, "PROBATIONARY ITB"	Short Sleeved White Shirt	Standard Olive Green Long Slacks + Canvas Belt	Standard School Tie (Repeating Pattern of MBS Crest)	None	Standard Sewn on Name Tag	Standard Black / White School Shoes & Socks
Information Technology Brigade (ITB) Briged IT / Lembaga ITB	2005	Senior Librarian (Informal)	"IT BRIGADE" SIlver Banner	Short Sleeved White Shirt	Pleatless Gray Long Slacks	Plain Gray Tie 'ITB Tie'	-	Metal, Silver Background + Black Lettering	Black Leather Shoes + Black Socks (Above Ankles)
Information Technology Brigade (ITB) Briged IT / Lembaga ITB	2005	Senior Librarian (Formal)	"IT BRIGADE" SIlver Banner	Long Sleeved White Shirt	Pleatless Gray Long Slacks	Plain Gray Tie 'ITB Tie'	Black Blazer + Embroidered Badge	Metal, Silver Background + Black Lettering	Black Leather Shoes + Black Socks (Above Ankles)
Information Technology Brigade (ITB) Briged IT / Lembaga ITB	2005	Executive Committee (EXCO)	Same with Seniors' Uniform + Additional Position Tag: Metal, Gold Background with Black Lettering (Badge on Left Corner) : "EXECUTIVE COMMMITEE","POSITION"						Black Leather Shoes + Black Socks (Above Ankles)
Board of Students' Co-operatives (BOSC) Lembaga Koperasi Sekolah	2007, 4 June	Probationary Co-operator	Standard School Badge + Black Probationary Tag, "PROBATIONARY BOSC"	Short Sleeved White Shirt	Standard Olive Green Long Slacks + Canvas Belt	Standard School Tie (Repeating Pattern of MBS Crest)	None	Standard Sewn on Name Tag	Standard Black / White School Shoes & Socks
Board of Students' Co-operatives (BOSC) Lembaga Koperasi Sekolah	2007, 4 June	Senior Co-operator (Informal)	"KOPERASI" Black Banner	Short Sleeved White Shirt	Pleatless Black Long Slacks	Standard School Tie (Repeating Pattern of MBS Crest)	-	Metal, Silver Background + Black Lettering (Badge on Left Corner)	Black Leather Shoes + Black Socks (Above Ankles)
Board of Students' Co-operatives (BOSC) Lembaga Koperasi Sekolah	2007, 4 June	Senior Co-operator (Formal)	"KOPERASI" Black Banner	Long Sleeved White Shirt	Pleatless Black Long Slacks	Standard School Tie (Repeating Pattern of MBS Crest)	Black Blazer + Embroidered Badge	Metal, Silver Background + Black Lettering (Badge on Left Corner)	Black Leather Shoes + Black Socks (Above Ankles)
Board of Students' Co-operatives (BOSC) Lembaga Koperasi Sekolah	2007, 4 June	Executive Committee (EXCO)	Same with Seniors' Uniform + Different Name Tag: Metal, Gold Background with Black Lettering (Badge on Left Corner) : "AHLI LEMBAGA KOPERASI MBSSKL", 'NAME', "POSITION"						Black Leather Shoes + Black Socks (Above Ankles)
Board of Students' SPBT (BOSS) Lembaga SPBT {SPBT - Skim Pinjaman Buku Teks}	2012	Probationary BOSS	Standard School Badge + Red Probationary Tag, "PROBATIONARY BOSS"	Short Sleeved White Shirt	Standard Olive Green Long Slacks + Canvas Belt	Standard School Tie (Repeating Pattern of MBS Crest)	None	Standard Sewn on Name Tag	
Board of Students' SPBT (BOSS) Lembaga SPBT {SPBT - Skim Pinjaman Buku Teks}	2012	Senior SPBT Prefect (Informal)	"SPBT" Red Banner	Short Sleeved Light Yellow Shirt	Pleatless White Long Slacks	Standard School Tie (Repeating Pattern of MBS Crest)	-	Metal, Gold Background with Black Lettering	
Board of Students' SPBT (BOSS) Lembaga SPBT {SPBT - Skim Pinjaman Buku Teks}	2012	Senior SPBT Prefect (Formal)	"SPBT" Red Banner	Short Sleeved Light Yellow Shirt	Pleatless White Long Slacks	Standard School Tie (Repeating Pattern of MBS Crest)	Black Blazer + Embroidered Badge	Metal, Gold Background with Black Lettering	
Board of Students' SPBT (BOSS) Lembaga SPBT {SPBT - Skim Pinjaman Buku Teks}	2012	Executive Committee (EXCO)	Same with Seniors' Uniform + Additional Position Tag (Badge on Left Corner) : Metal, Gold Background with Black Lettering: "EXECUTIVE COMMITTEE", "POSITION"						
Board of Students' Electronics (BOSE) Lembaga Elektronik	2020	Probationary BOSE Member	Standard School Badge + White Probationary Tag, "PROBATIONARY BOSE"	Short Sleeved White Shirt	Standard Olive Green Long Slacks + Canvas Belt	Standard School Tie (Repeating Pattern of MBS Crest)	None	Standard Sewn on Name Tag	Standard Black / White School Shoes & Socks
Board of Students' Electronics (BOSE) Lembaga Elektronik	2020	Senior BOSE Member (Informal)	"BOSE" Red Banner	Short Sleeved White Shirt	Pleatless Red Long Slacks	Standard School Tie (Repeating Pattern of MBS Crest)	-	Metal, Silver Background + Black Lettering (Badge on Left Corner)	Black Leather Shoes + Black Socks (Above Ankles)
Board of Students' Electronics (BOSE) Lembaga Elektronik	2020	Senior BOSE Member (Formal)	"BOSE" Red Banner	Long Sleeved White Shirt	Pleatless Red Long Slacks	Standard School Tie (Repeating Pattern of MBS Crest)	Black Blazer + Embroidered Badge	Metal, Silver Background + Black Lettering (Badge on Left Corner)	Black Leather Shoes + Black Socks (Above Ankles)
Board of Students' Electronics (BOSE) Lembaga Elektronik	2020	Executive Committee (EXCO)	Same with Seniors' Uniform + Additional Position Tag: Metal, Silver Background + Black Lettering (Badge on Left Corner): "EXECUTIVE COMMITTEE","POSITION"						Black Leather Shoes + Black Socks (Above Ankles)
(COMBI) Lembaga COMBI {Communication for Behavioural Impact}	2022	Probation Status: N/A							Standard Black / White School Shoes & Socks
(COMBI) Lembaga COMBI {Communication for Behavioural Impact}	2022	Senior COMBI Member (Formal & Informal)	"COMBI" White Banner	Short Sleeved White Shirt	Standard Olive Green Long Slacks + Canvas Belt	Standard School Tie (Repeating Pattern of MBS Crest)	None	Metal, Silver Background + Black Lettering (Badge on Left Corner)	Standard Black / White School Shoes & Socks
(COMBI) Lembaga COMBI {Communication for Behavioural Impact}	2022	Executive Committee (EXCO)	Same with Seniors' Uniform + Additional Position Tag: Metal, Silver Background + Black Lettering (Badge on Left Corner): "EXECUTIVE COMMITTEE","POSITION"						Standard Black / White School Shoes & Socks
(PRS) Lembaga PRS {Pembimbing Rakan Sebaya}	2024	Probation Status: N/A							
(PRS) Lembaga PRS {Pembimbing Rakan Sebaya}	2024	Senior PRS Member (Informal)	"PRS" Purple Banner	Long Sleeved Purple Shirt	Pleatless Black Long Slacks	Standard School Tie (Repeating Pattern of MBS Crest)	-	Plastic, Purple Background + White Lettering (Badge on Left Corner)	Black Leather Shoes + Black Socks (Above Ankles)
(PRS) Lembaga PRS {Pembimbing Rakan Sebaya}	2024	Senior PRS Member (Formal)	"PRS" Purple Banner	Long Sleeved Purple Shirt	Pleatless Black Long Slacks	Standard School Tie (Repeating Pattern of MBS Crest)	Purple PRS Vest	Plastic, Purple Background + White Lettering (Badge on Left Corner)	Black Leather Shoes + Black Socks (Above Ankles)
(PRS) Lembaga PRS {Pembimbing Rakan Sebaya}	2024	Executive Committee (EXCO)	Same with Seniors' Uniform + Additional Position Tag: Plastic, Yellow Background + Black Lettering: "EXECUTIVE COMMITTEE","POSITION"						Black Leather Shoes + Black Socks (Above Ankles)

== Alumni association ==
The alumni association of MBSSKL is known as MBSalumni, previously known as MBSOBA (Methodist Boys' School Old Boys Association). Its first documented meeting was in 1919. It was set up with the objective of providing a platform for all former students to keep in touch with each other and also to maintain contact with the school.

== Notable alumni ==
=== Academician ===
- Chin Hoong Fong – Professor Emeritus, Universiti Putra Malaysia

=== Business ===
- Tan Sri Lim Kok Thay – Chairman, Genting Group and Star Cruises

=== Law ===
- Lai Kew Chai – Former Supreme Court of Singapore Judge

=== Public service ===
- Cheong Choong Kong – Chairman of the Oversea-Chinese Banking Corporation Singapore and former CEO of Singapore Airlines
- Mohd Shuhaily Mohd Zain – Director-General of the Malaysian Border Security Agency

=== Politics ===
- Dato' Haji Abdul Rahman Talib – Former Transport Minister of Malaysia
- Dato Syed Hamid Albar – Former Home Minister of Malaysia
- Datuk Seri Ong Tee Keat – 8th President of the Malaysian Chinese Association, former Transport Minister of Malaysia
- Ong Pang Boon – Former Minister for Education of Singapore, was a prominent first-generation member of the People's Action Party (PAP)

=== Media and entertainment ===
- Awal Ashaari – Actor and TV host
- Faizal Hussein – Actor and TV host

=== Medical ===
- Noor Hisham Abdullah – Endocrine surgeon and former Director General of Health of the Malaysian Ministry of Health, since 1 March 2013
