= Mohd Sapuan Salit =

Material scientist

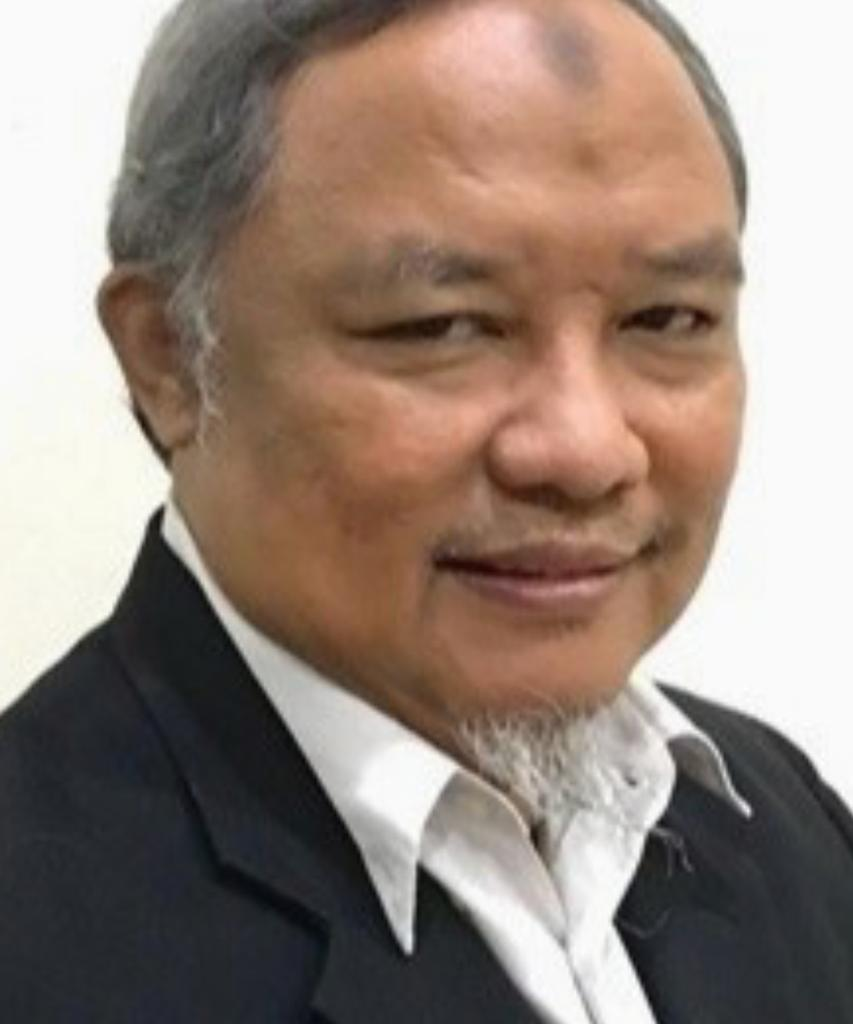
- Born: 25 September 1965 (age 60); Teluk Intan
- Other name: S.M. Sapuan
- Education: University of Newcastle, New South Wales; B. Eng (Mechanical Engineering); Loughborough University; M.Sc (Engineering Design); De Montfort University, Leicester Ph.D (Material Engineering)
- Scientific career
- Fields: Composite material, Material science
- Workplaces: Universiti Putra Malaysia

Mohd Sapuan Salit (born 25 September 1965) is a material scientist, engineer, and the head of Advanced Engineering Materials and Composites (AEMC), a research centre in Universiti Putra Malaysia (UPM). He is a professor in composite material at the Department of Mechanical and Manufacturing Engineering, Faculty of Engineering, Universiti Putra Malaysia. Sapuan is also previously the chief executive editor for all Pertanika journals.

== Early life and education ==
Mohd Sapuan was born in Kampung Sungai Nibong, Kota Setia, Teluk Intan, Perak on 25 September 1965. He received his early education at Sekolah Kebangsaan Sungai Besar, Kota Setia, Teluk Intan, Perak. Then, for his secondary school education, he attended Sekolah Menengah Horley Methodist, Teluk Intan, Perak and Sekolah Menengah Teknik, Persiaran Brash, Ipoh, Perak.

Due to his excellent results at SPM level, Sapuan was offered a scholarship to pursue his studies in Australia in 1984 at Brighton High School, Victoria for HSC certificate and then at the University of Newcastle, New South Wales where he was awarded a Bachelor of Engineering (Mechanical Engineering) degree in 1990. In 1994, he earned his Master of Science in engineering design at Loughborough University, Leicestershire, United Kingdom. In 1998, he was conferred a Doctor of Philosophy in materials engineering from De Montfort University, Leicester, United Kingdom.

== Career ==
After obtaining his master's degree in 1994, Sapuan was offered a tutoring position at the Department of Mechanical and Systems Engineering, Faculty of Engineering, Universiti Pertanian Malaysia. After completing his PhD degree in 1998, he was appointed as a lecturer in the Department of Mechanical and Manufacturing Engineering, Faculty of Engineering, UPM.

He was also co-appointed at the Centre for Advanced Materials Research, at the Institute of Advanced Technology (ITMA), UPM in 1999 as one of the founders of ITMA where Sapuan was appointed head of the centre in 2001.

In 2002, he was promoted to the post of associate professor, and later the professor of Grade C post in 2007. Professor Mohd Sapuan was appointed head, Department of Mechanical and Manufacturing Engineering for three years (2008–2011). In 2011, he was promoted to the position of Grade B professor, and in 2019, was promoted to Grade A professor.

Sapuan is the founding head of the Engineering Composite Research Group, Faculty of Engineering, UPM (2009–2018). He also took the role as head of Technology Biocomposite Laboratory, Institute of Tropical Forestry and Forest Products (INTROP), UPM from 2014 to 2017 and from 2020 to 2022. He is also the founding head of the Centre for Advanced Engineering and Composite Materials Research, Faculty of Engineering, UPM founded in 2018 to this day.

== Research interest and affiliations ==
His field of research is composite materials, biocomposite materials, engineering design, design for manufacturing, simultaneous design, design for sustainability, machination of biocomposite materials, and material selection.

Sapuan is a professional engineer, Board of Engineers Malaysia, Fellow, Society of Automotive Engineers International USA, Fellow, Academy of Sciences Malaysia, Fellow, Plastic and Rubber and Institute Malaysia, Fellow, Malaysian Scientific Association Fellow, International Biographical Association and Fellow of the Institute of Materials Malaysia.

He is an honorary member and former vice president of the Asian Polymer Association and an honorary member and founding manager of the Malaysian Enau Development and Industry Association (PPIEM). Sapuan is the co-editor-in-chief of the journal Functional Composites and Structures, and a member of the editorial board of more than 24 journals.

== Awards and honours ==
In 2014, he won the Best Technical Paper Award titled "Design with Natural Fibre Composites" at Universiti Malaysia Sarawak – Science Technology Engineering Mathematics – Engineering Conference 2014 (UNIMAS STEM EnCon2014). The award was presented by Profesor Dr Kifli Bujang, the deputy vice chancellor (research and innovation) of Universiti Malaysia Sarawak.

He won Khwarizmi International Award in the year 2013. He also has won Anugerah Penyelidik Cemerlang Universiti Putra Malaysia in the year 2005, 2007 and 2008. Sapuan is also the winner of ISESCO Science Prizes – 2008.

Mohd Sapuan became the first Malaysian engineer to be elected as Fellow of the United States' Society of Automotive Engineers International (SAE) in 2016. The award was given to outstanding professionals across the globe each year since the inception of SAE Fellow in 1975.

In July 2017, his paper titled "Implementation of the Expert Decision System for Environmental Assessment on Composite Materials Selection for Automotive Components" won the Outstanding Technical Paper Award based on Published Paper Journal 2016 from the Society of Automotive Engineers Malaysia (SAE) at the 2nd International Conference on Sustainable Mobility (ICSM2017), Kuala Lumpur.

Sapuan received the Malaysia's Research Star Award from the Ministry of Education Malaysia and Elsevier Asia Pacific in 2018.

In 2019, the Academy of Sciences Malaysia honored Sapuan as one of the Top Research Scientist Malaysia for his outstanding achievement in research and development of science, technology and innovation in the field of materials and concurrent engineering.

In 2021, Sapuan was awarded the Anugerah Khas Akademia Putra 2021 which is the overall highest honour in Majlis Gemilang Akademia Putra (MGAP) 2021 from the Pro Canselor DYTM Tengku Amir Shah Sultan Sharafuddin Idris Shah Alhaj. He also received the Professor of Eminence Award during the 2nd International Conference on Chemistry, Industry and Environment at Aligarh Muslim University, India.

In 2022, he received UPM Employee Figure Award (Academic) 2021. He also received SAE Subir Chowdhury Medal of Quality Leadership from the Society of Automotive Engineers International (SAE International) presented by Dr. Sri Srinath and Dr. Subir Chowdhury, Chairman and the CEO of ASI Consulting Group LLC, Michigan during the yearly organized conference, SAE WCX Experience (April 5–7, 2022) in Detroit. He is the first recipient of the award from outside of the United States of America. He is also the winner of 2024 TWAS Award in Engineering Sciences announced in Nov 2022 from The World Academy of Sciences for his contribution to the properties, conceptual design and materials selection of tropical natural- fibre composites, based on in-depth experimental and design-based investigations. In December 2022, he received Outstanding Contribution Award from International Society of Bionic Engineering (ISBE), China in recognition of his contributions in the field of Bionic Engineering.

In February 2023, he won IET Malaysia Leadership Award (Academic) for his achievement throughout 2022 in the field of vocational materials and manufacture of specialties from The Institution of Engineering and Technology.

In 2024, he became a laureate of the Asian Scientist 100 by the Asian Scientist.
