= Malaysian Border Security Agency =

Malaysian Border Security Agency Agensi Keselamatan Sempadan Malaysia اڬيسي كاولن سمڤادن مليسيا
- Abbreviation: BSA / AKSEM

Agency overview
- Formed: 2015
- Dissolved: 16 November 2022
- Superseding agency: Malaysian Checkpoints and Borders Agency
- Employees: 613 (2022)

Jurisdictional structure
- National agency (Operations jurisdiction): Malaysia
- Operations jurisdiction: Malaysia
- Legal jurisdiction: Land borders between Malaysia and Thailand, Indonesia, and Brunei
- Primary governing body: Government of Malaysia
- Secondary governing body: Ministry of Home Affairs
- Constituting instrument: Malaysian Border Security Agency Act 2017
- General nature: Civilian police
- Specialist jurisdiction: National border patrol, security, integrity

Operational structure
- Headquarters: Aras 7, Blok D7, Kompleks D, Kementerian Dalam Negeri, Putrajaya, Malaysia

Malaysian Border Security Agency (BSA), also known as AKSEM (Malay: Agensi Kawalan SEmpadan Malaysia, Jawi: اڬيسي كاولن سمڤادن مليسيا) was a Malaysian government agency that operated to guard the country's entry and exit points from illegal activities such as smuggling, illegal migration and human trafficking. AKSEM was first administratively established in 2015 and then officially established in 2017 with the passing of the Malaysian Border Security Act 2017, but was then dissolved in December 2022 when the said Act was repealed, with its officers and personnels absorbed into the General Operations Force.

== History ==
=== Establishment ===
Administratively established in 2015, the agency was manned by some 10,000 officials from the Malaysian Armed Forces, Royal Malaysia Police, General Operations Force and the Smuggling Prevention Unit (UPP).

In 2017, the Malaysian Border Security Agency Act 2017 [Act 799] was passed by the Parliament of Malaysia to formally establish and further empower the agency. During the passing of the bill, the then-Deputy Prime Minister, Ahmad Zahid Hamid assures that there will be no overlapping of duties between government agencies and no additional cost will be inccured, as the agency's officers will be taken from other existing agencies such as police, customs, immigration, National Anti-Drug Agency, National Kenaf and Tobacco Board and other relevant authorities.

Under Act 799, which took effect on 29 December 2017, the agency was tasked to protect Malaysia's land borders with Thailand, Indonesia, and Brunei only and to curb any cross-border crimes in those areas.

=== Dissolution ===
On 12 March 2021, the Malaysian Cabinet decided to restructure the agency to place it under the Royal Malaysia Police (PDRM). It was also decided that the Malaysian Border Security Agency Act 2017 [Act 799] will be repealed once the restructuring is completed. The restructuring of AKSEM into the police forces, which took place in phases in a span of three months from 30 June 2021 to 30 September 2021, saw some 613 agency officers and personnel absorbed into the Internal Security and Public Order Department of the General Operations Force under PDRM.

In December 2021, the bill to repeal Act 799 and dissolve the agency was tabled in the Parliament. It was unanimously passed by the Dewan Rakyat on 18 July 2022 and by Dewan Negara on 8 August 2022. The agency was officially dissolved on 16 November 2022 when the dissolution Act took effect on that day.

AKSEM would eventually be replaced and succeed by a new agency, which is called the Malaysia Border Control and Protection Agency on 1 February 2025, when the Malaysia Border Control and Protection Agency Act 2024 [Act 860] fully went into effect. Under Act 860, the powers and jurisdiction of the new agency was expanded to encompass all land, sea, and air entry points of the country, unlike AKSEM, which was only tasked to control the land borders of Malaysia.

== See also ==
- List of national border guard agencies
