= Pertanika Journal of Social Sciences & Humanities =

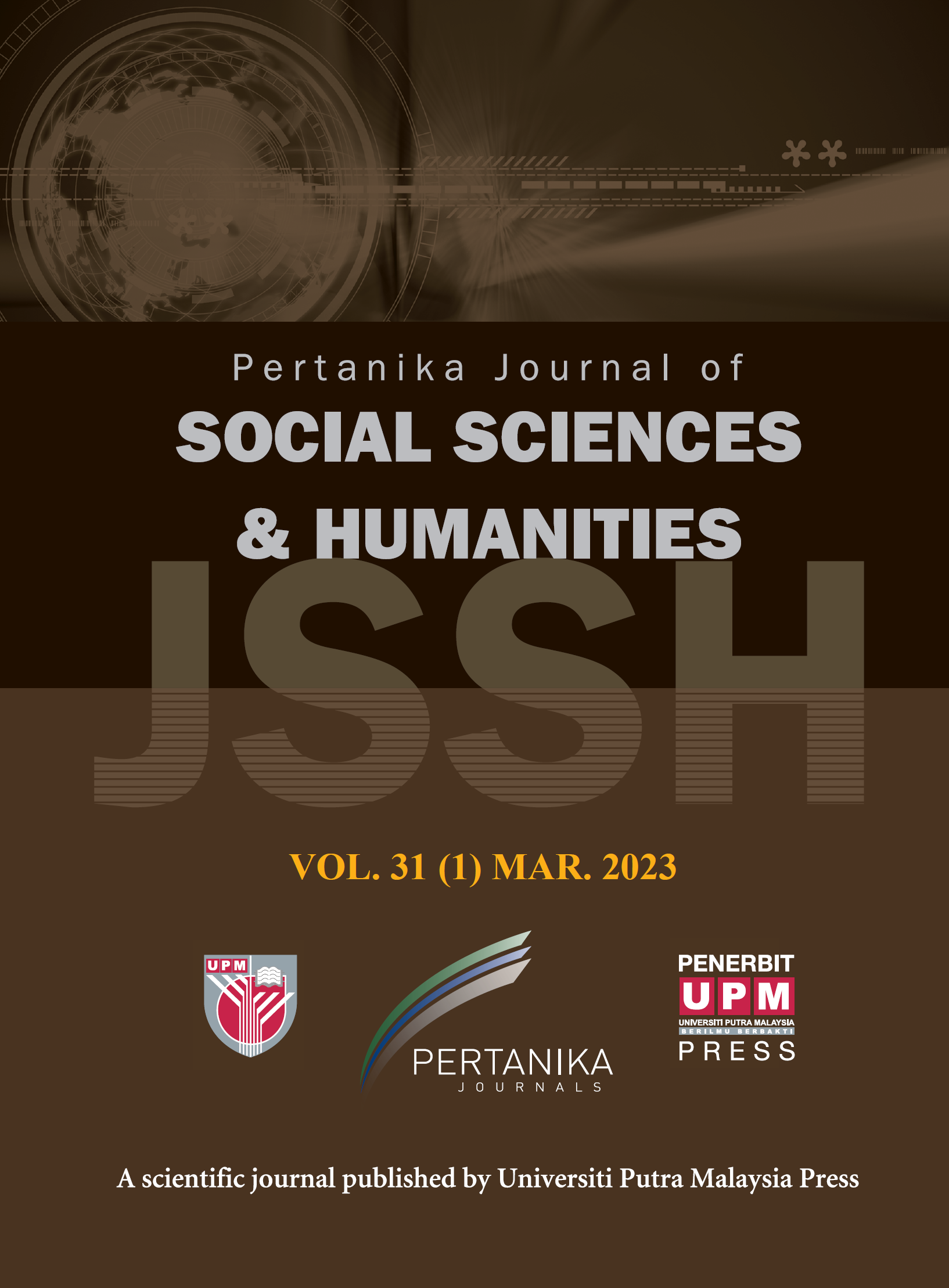
- Discipline: Social Sciences, Humanities
- Language: English
- Edited by: Puvaneswaran Kunasekaran

Publication details
- History: 1993–present
- Publisher: UPM Press (Malaysia)
- Frequency: Quarterly
- Open access: Yes
- Impact factor: 0.4 (2022)

Standard abbreviations
- ISO 4: Pertanika J. Soc. Sci. Humanit.

Indexing
- ISSN: 0128-7702 (print); 2231-8534 (web)
- LCCN: 95944342
- OCLC no.: 37279998

Links
- Journal homepage; Online archive

The Pertanika Journal of Social Sciences & Humanities is a quarterly peer-reviewed open-access academic journal published by UPM Press (University of Putra Malaysia). It covers all aspects of social and behavioural sciences as well as the humanities. The editor-in-chief is Puvaneswaran Kunasekaran (Universiti of Putra Malaysia).

== History ==
The journal was part of the journal Pertanika, which was established in 1978. In 1993 this journal was split into three more specialized ones: Pertanika Journal of Tropical Agricultural Science, Pertanika Journal of Social Sciences & Humanities, and Pertanika Journal of Science & Technology.

== Reception ==
In 2015, the journal received a National CREAM Award from the Malaysian Government.

== Abstracting and indexing ==
The journal is abstracted and indexed in:

- CAB Abstracts
- EBSCO databases
- Emerging Sources Citation Index
- ProQuest databases
- Scopus

According to the Journal Citation Reports, the journal has a 2022 impact factor of 0.4.
