= Pulau Ketam =

Island of Selangor, Malaysia

Ketam Island
Native name: Pulau Ketam ڤولاو کتم
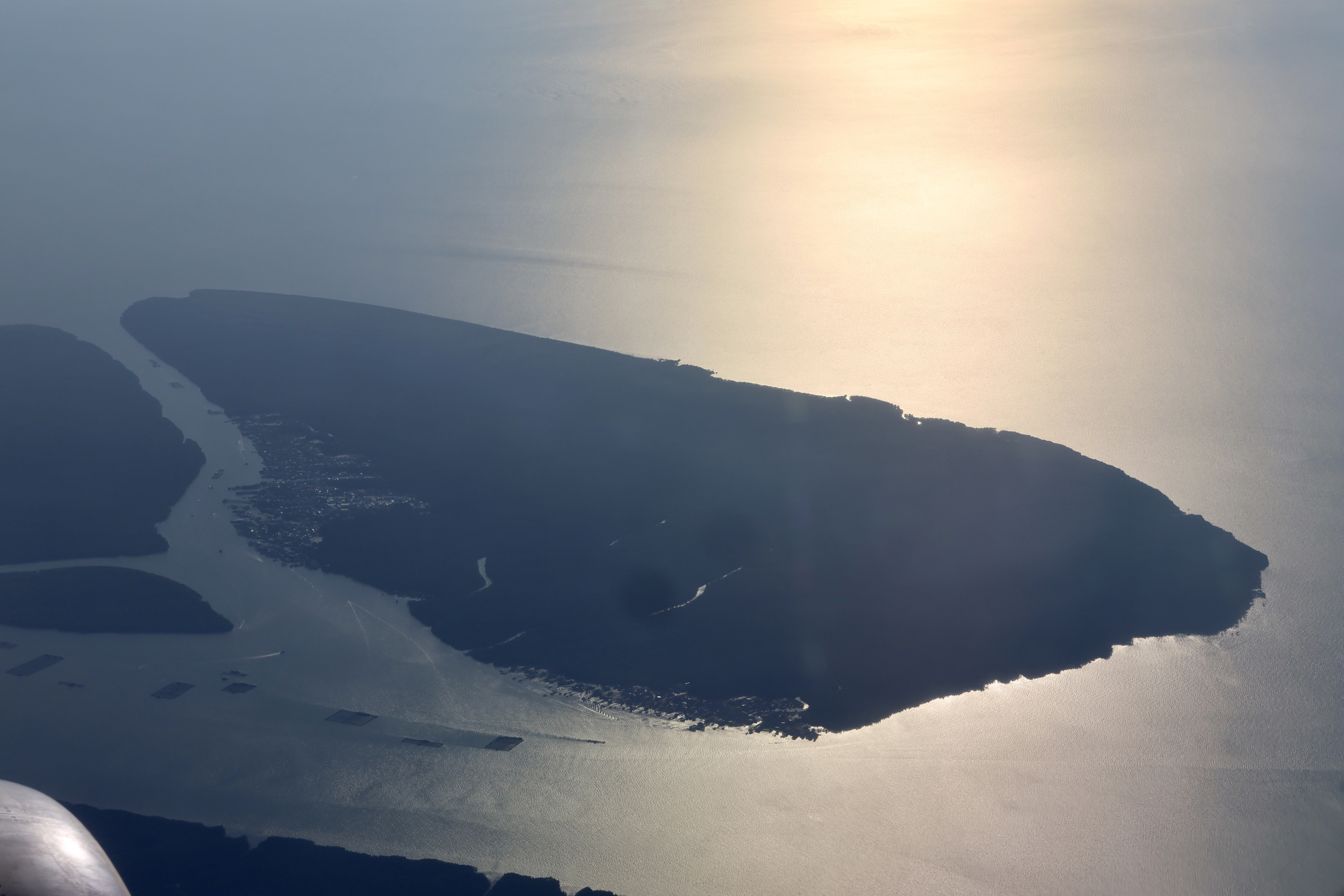
- Pulau Ketam in 2023
- Interactive map of Ketam Island

Geography
- Location: Strait of Malacca
- Coordinates: 3°2′18.5″N 101°14′48.8″E
- Area: 22.921 km^{2} (8.850 sq mi)

Administration
- Malaysia
- State: Selangor
- District: Klang
- Mukim: Klang

Demographics
- Population: 2,000 (2016)
- Ethnic groups: Majority Chinese (Hokkien, Teochew and Hainanese) with minority Malays, Mah Meri and Temuan

Pulau Ketam ("Crab Island", Jawi: ڤولاو کتم, simplified Chinese: 吉胆岛; traditional Chinese: 吉膽島; pinyin: Jídǎn Dǎo) is an island located off the coast of Port Klang, Selangor, Malaysia. The island is in the intertidal zone and the chief vegetation is mangrove.

== Background ==
The island is home to two predominantly Chinese fishing villages founded circa 1880. The main village on the southern side of the island is also known as Pulau Ketam. The other village on the northeastern side is called Sungai Lima (lit. 'Fifth River', simplified Chinese: 五条港; traditional Chinese: 五條港; pinyin: Wǔtiáogǎng; Pe̍h-ōe-jī: Gō·Tiâu Kang), its location being at the fifth inlet from the main village. The locals are mainly Teochew and Hokkien Chinese, with Teochew, Hokkien and Mandarin Chinese the main dialects spoken. There is also a small recently relocated Orang Asli community at the second inlet. The rest of the island consists of mangrove swamps.

As the island is submerged during high tide, housing on the island consists of "floating houses" perched on wooden stilts 1 to 10 metres (3 to 33 ft) above sea level. The main thoroughfares are narrow concreted pavements, whilst in the residential areas, the older rickety wooden plank bridges can still be seen. There are no cars on the island; bicycles, some of which are motorised, are the main means of transportation within the villages. There are no pavements linking the villages, the only means of transportation between villages is by boat. Daily ferry services link the island to Port Klang jetty on the mainland.

The main economic activity on the island is fishing. The island is also a tourist spot.

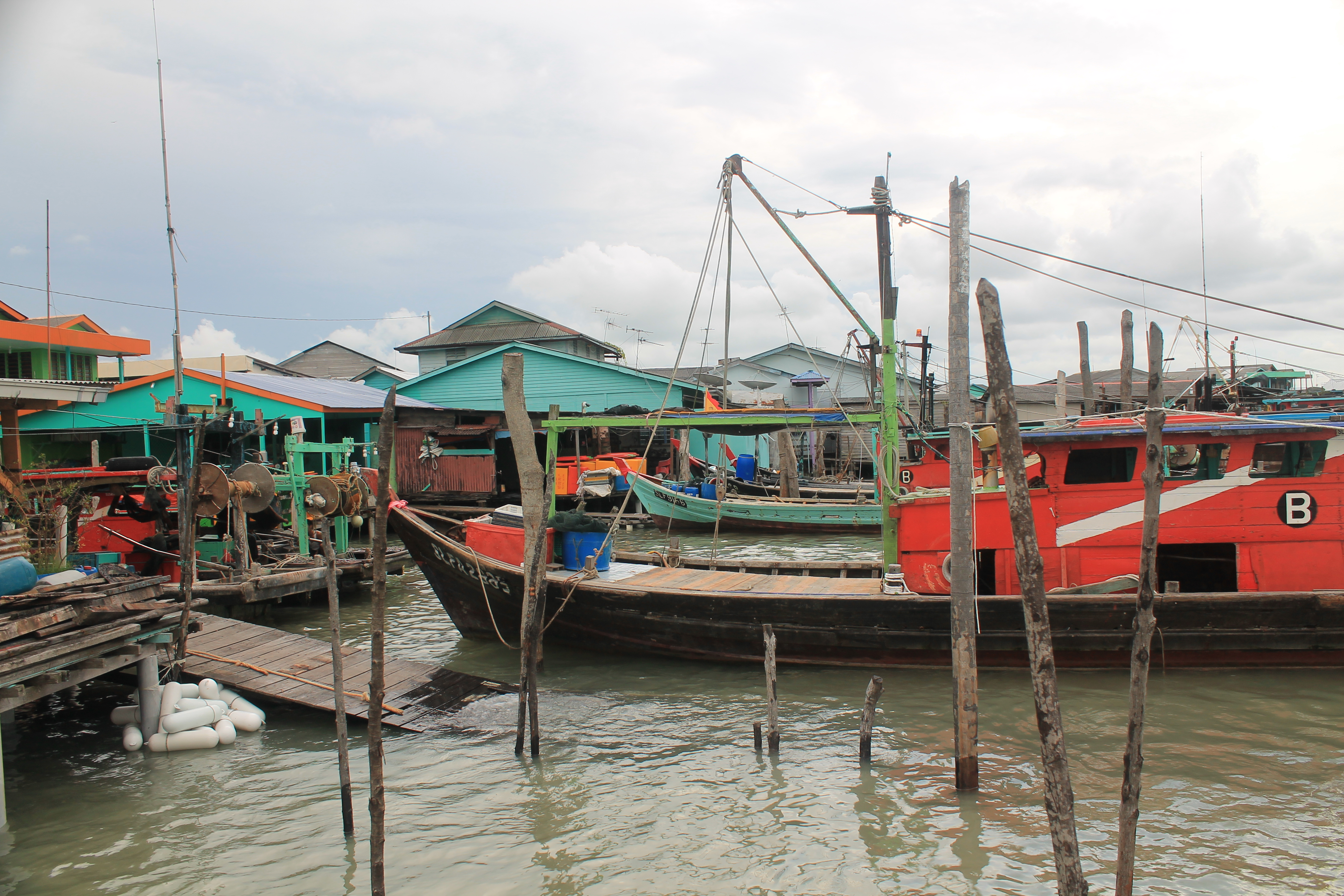
Fishing boats along coast side of the island

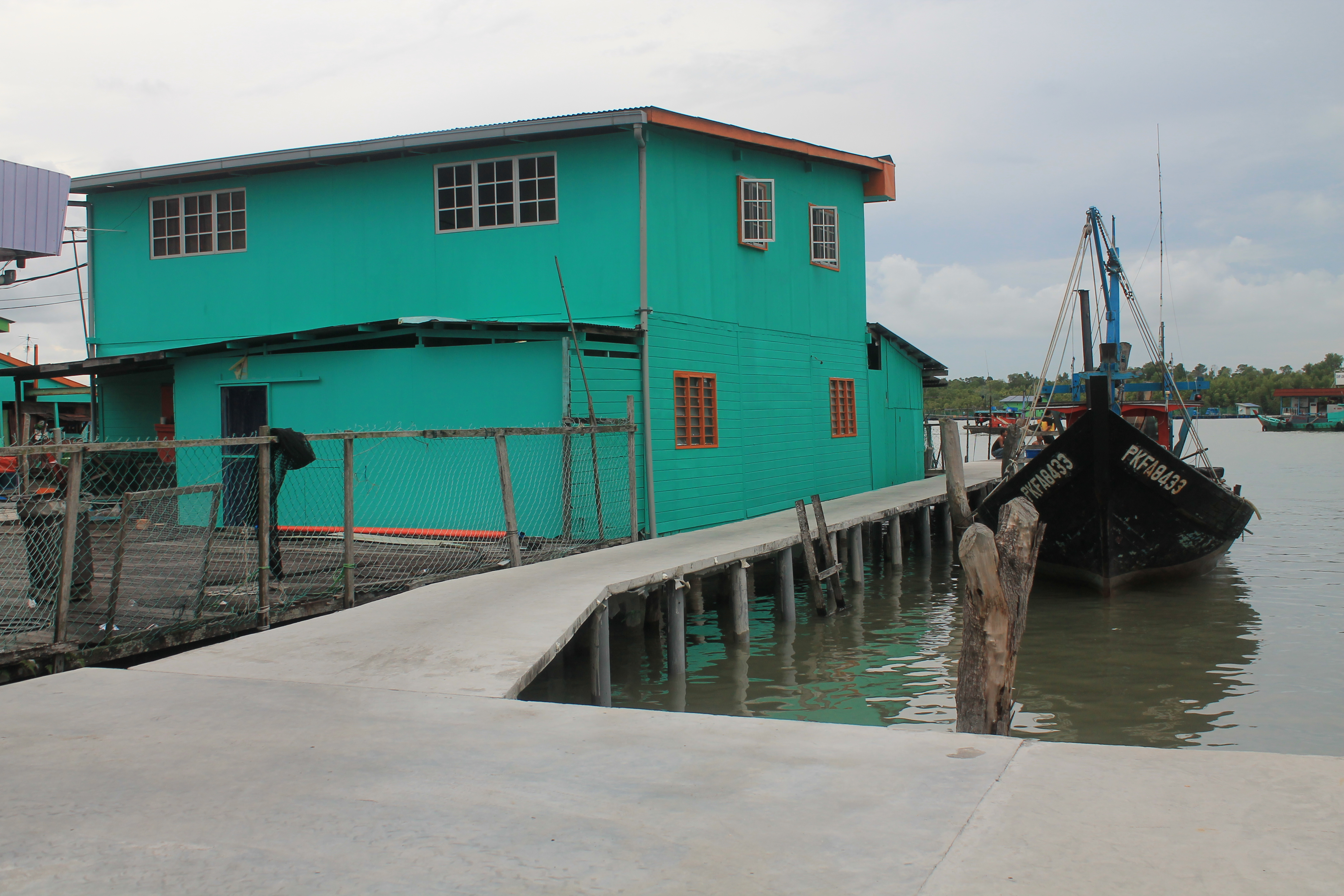
House beside the sea

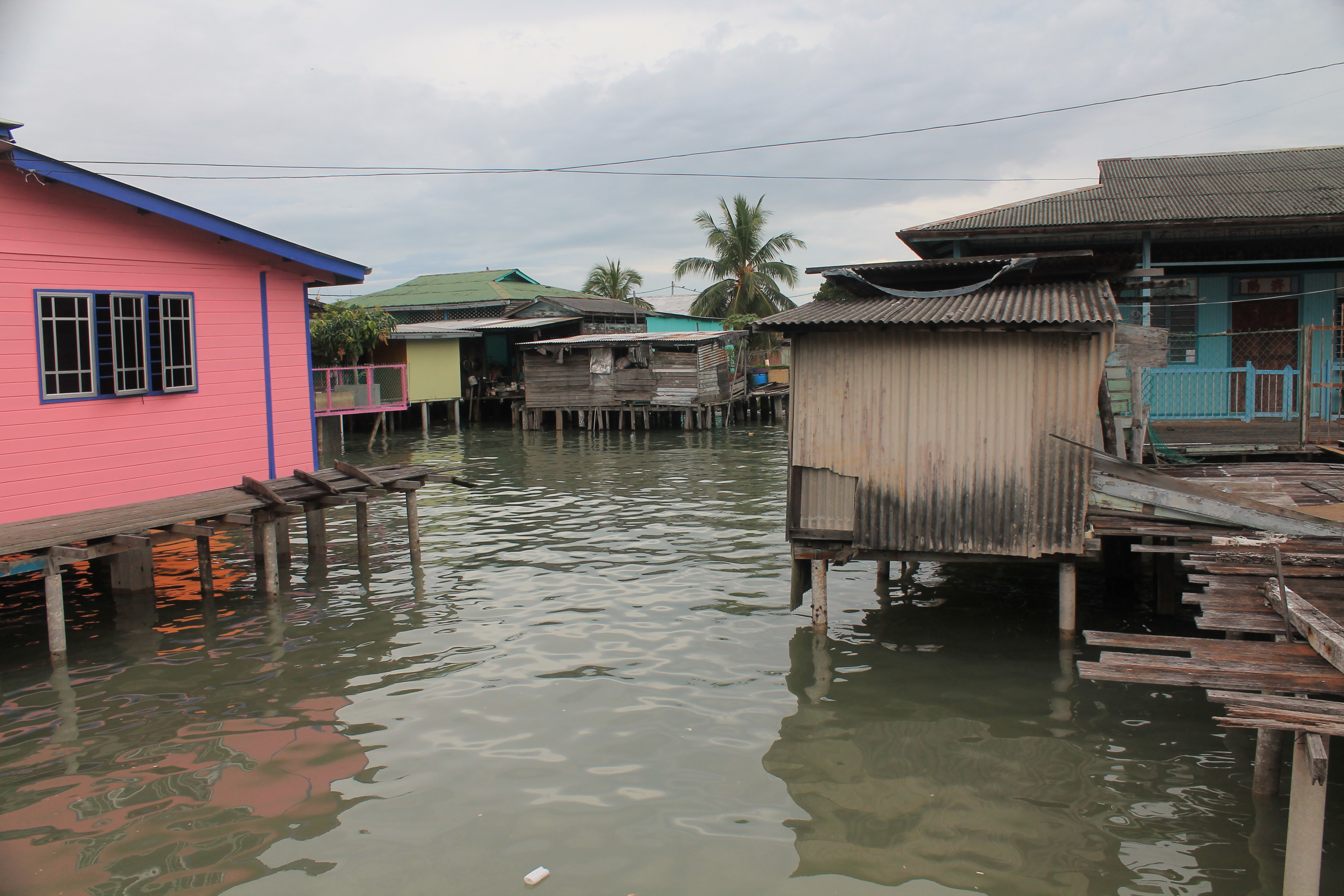
Houses on the island during high tide

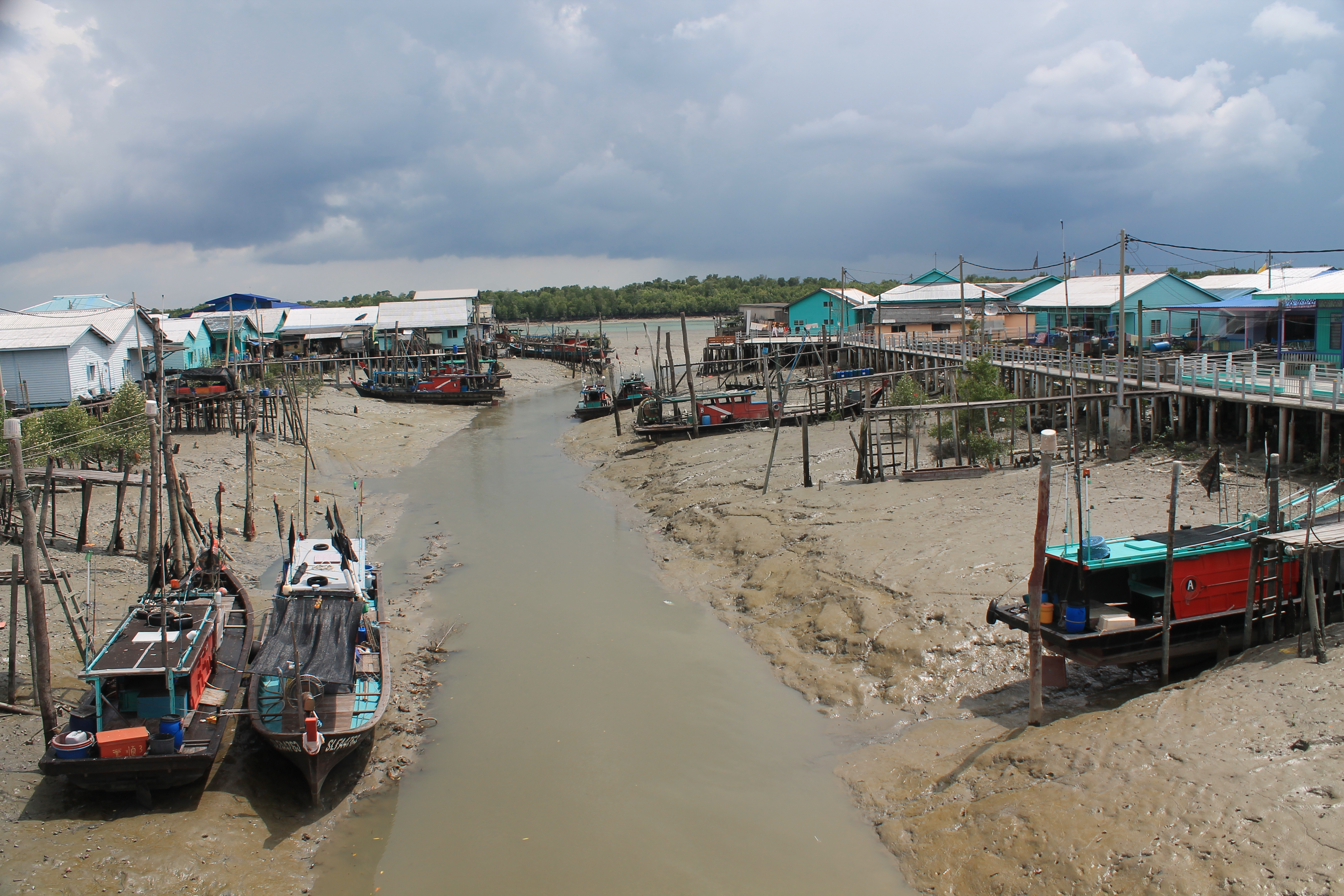
River channel on the island during low tide

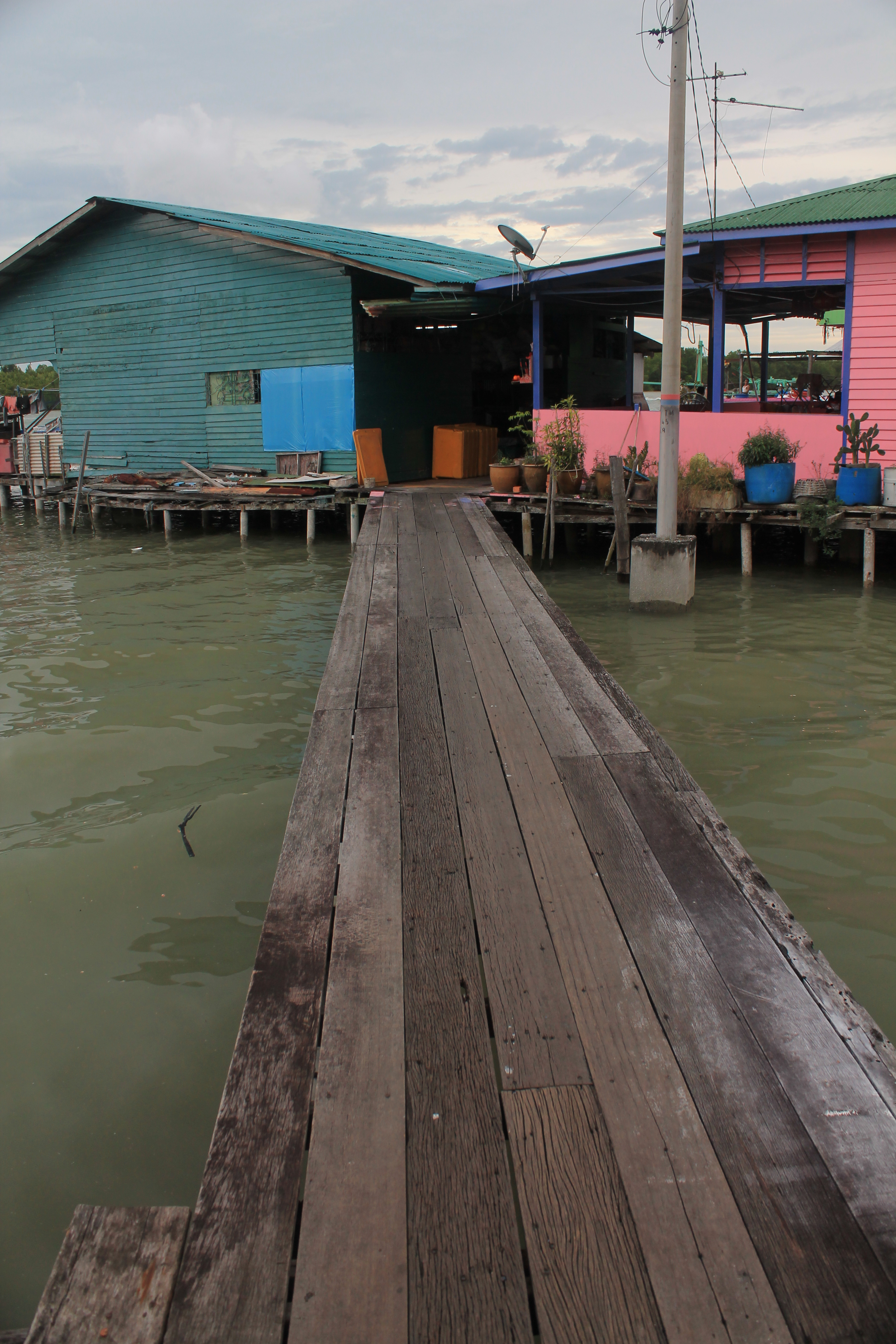
Wooden bridge road on the island

Cement bridge on the island

Cement road on the island

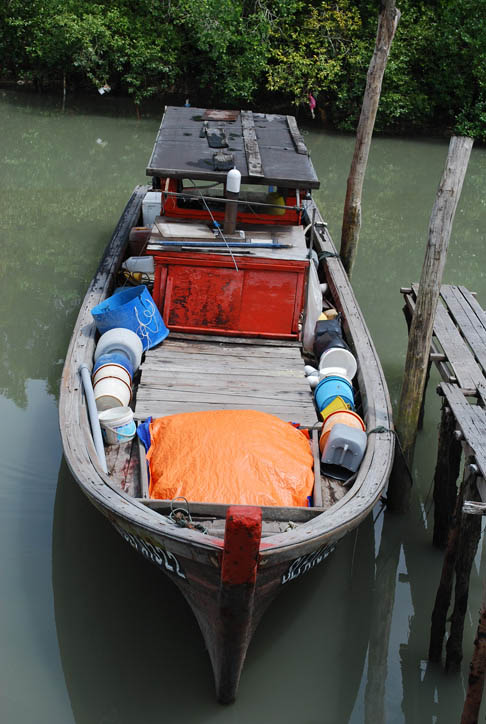
A river fishing boat for crab harvesting.

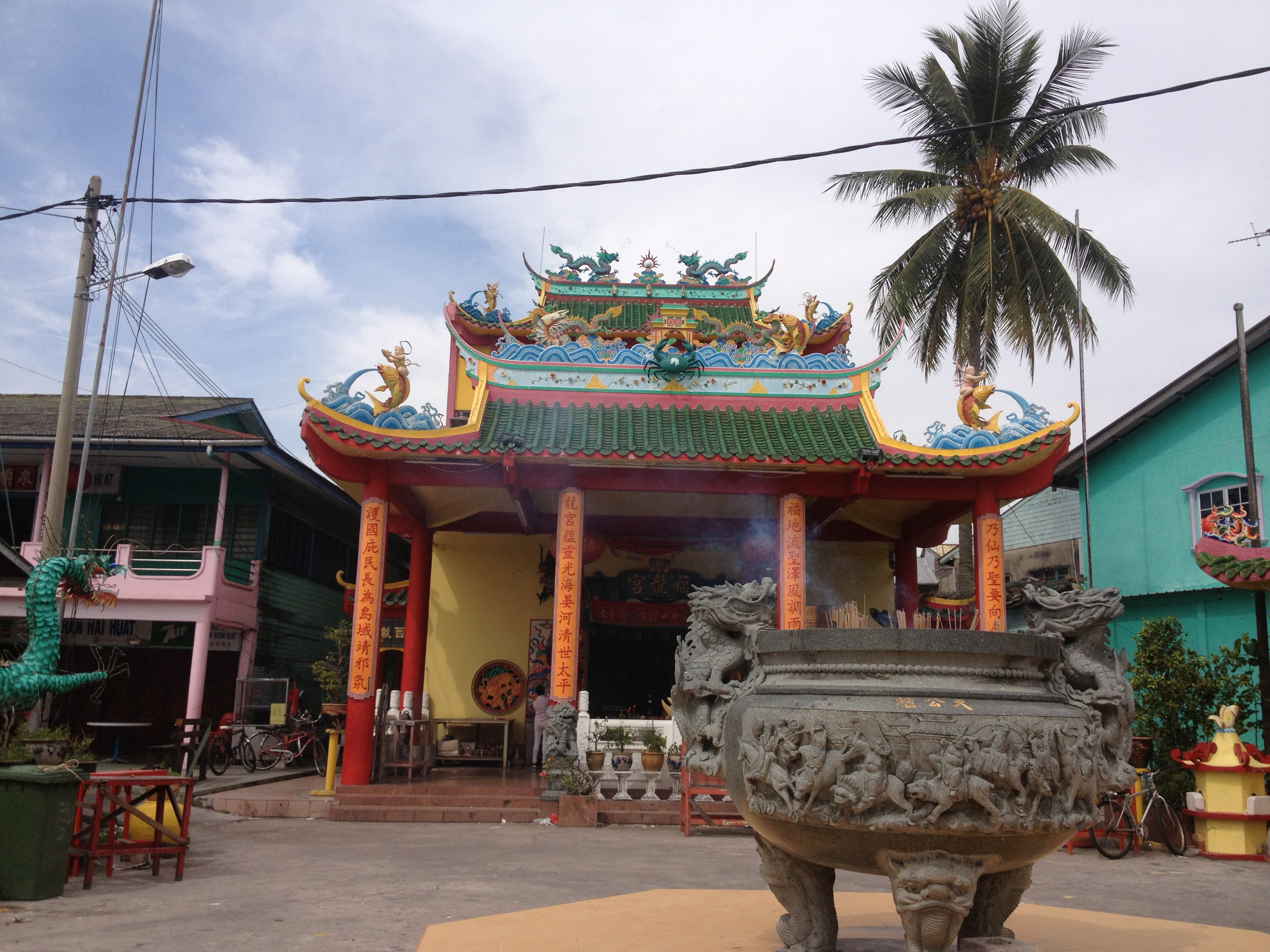
Temple on the island

Temple on the island
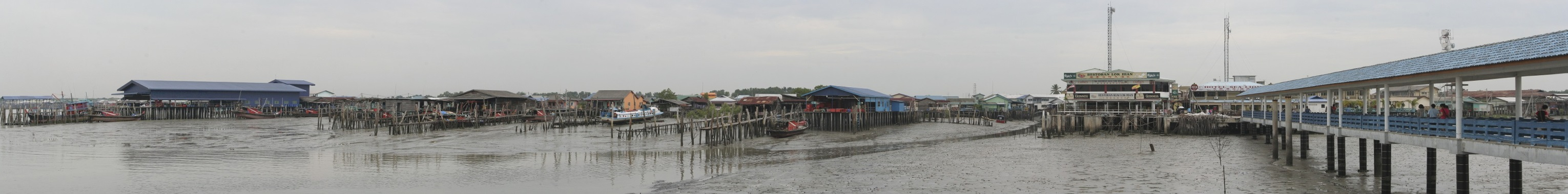
Panoramic view of Pulau Ketam coast.

== In popular culture ==
Pulau Ketam is featured as the main filming location for 2015 Malaysian movie, Paint My Love.
