= Bestinet =

Bestinet Sdn. Bhd.
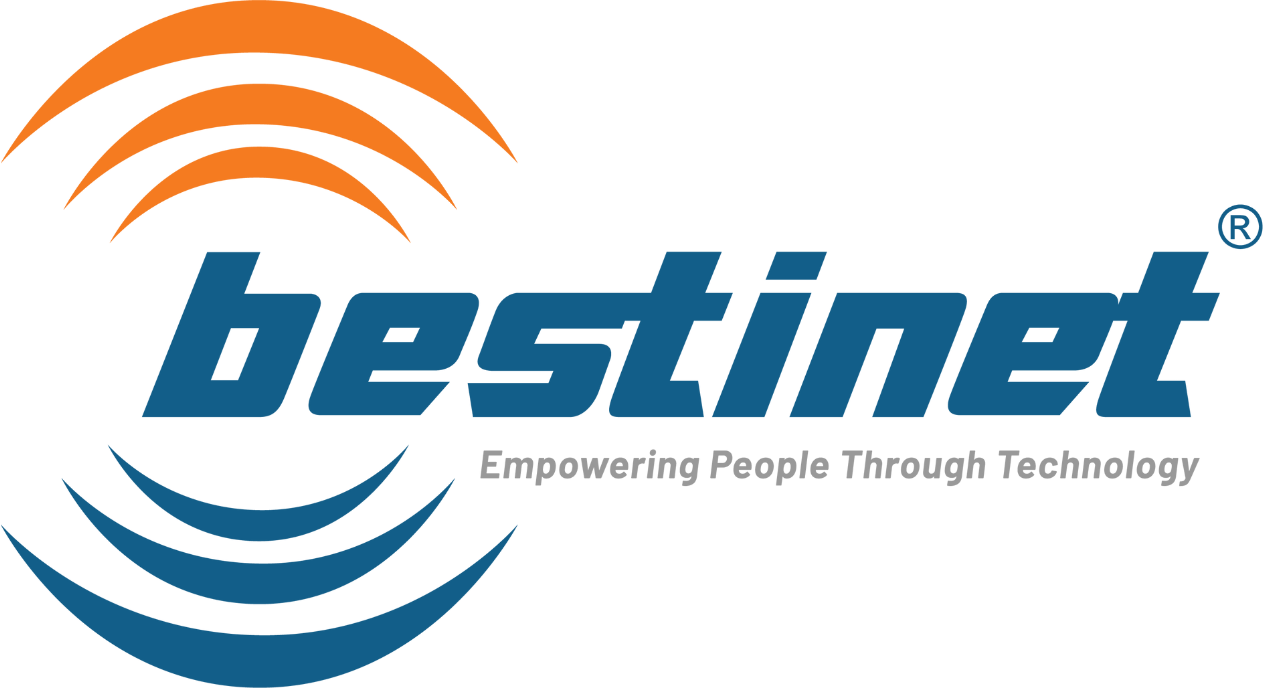
- Trade name: Bestinet
- Industry: Information technology
- Founded: 17 November 2008; 17 years ago
- Headquarters: Kuala Lumpur, Malaysia
- Key people: Aminul Islam (Founder)
- Website: www.bestinet.com.my

Bestinet Sdn. Bhd. (d.b.a Bestinet) is a Malaysian information technology company based in Cyberjaya, Selangor. It operates the Foreign Workers Centralised Management System for the Immigration Department of Malaysia as a patch-on module of the Malaysian Immigration System.

== Background ==
Bestinet was incorporated on 17 November 2008 and founded by Aminul Islam Abdul Nor. The company initially pitched a foreign workers recruitment software to the Malaysian Government as a corruption proof system.

== Controversies ==
The company and its founder is involved in multiple controversies. Aminul Islam is a naturalised Malaysian who came as a Bangladeshi foreign worker in 1988 and is also currently subject to an extradition request issued by Bangladesh. On 23 January 2026, Bloomberg News published an exposé into endemic corruption in the Bangladesh-Malaysia migrant worker system, mentioning Bestinet's alledged role in enabling Aminul Islam's associate, Ruhul Amin, to extort foreign workers.

=== The Universal Recruitment Advanced Platform ===
The Universal Recruitment Advanced Platform (TURAP) is a foreign workers recruitment system developed by Bestinet proposed for the Ministry of Human Resources. The system received backlash for the lack of transparency and scrutiny on Bestinet.
