= Pertanika Journal of Science & Technology =

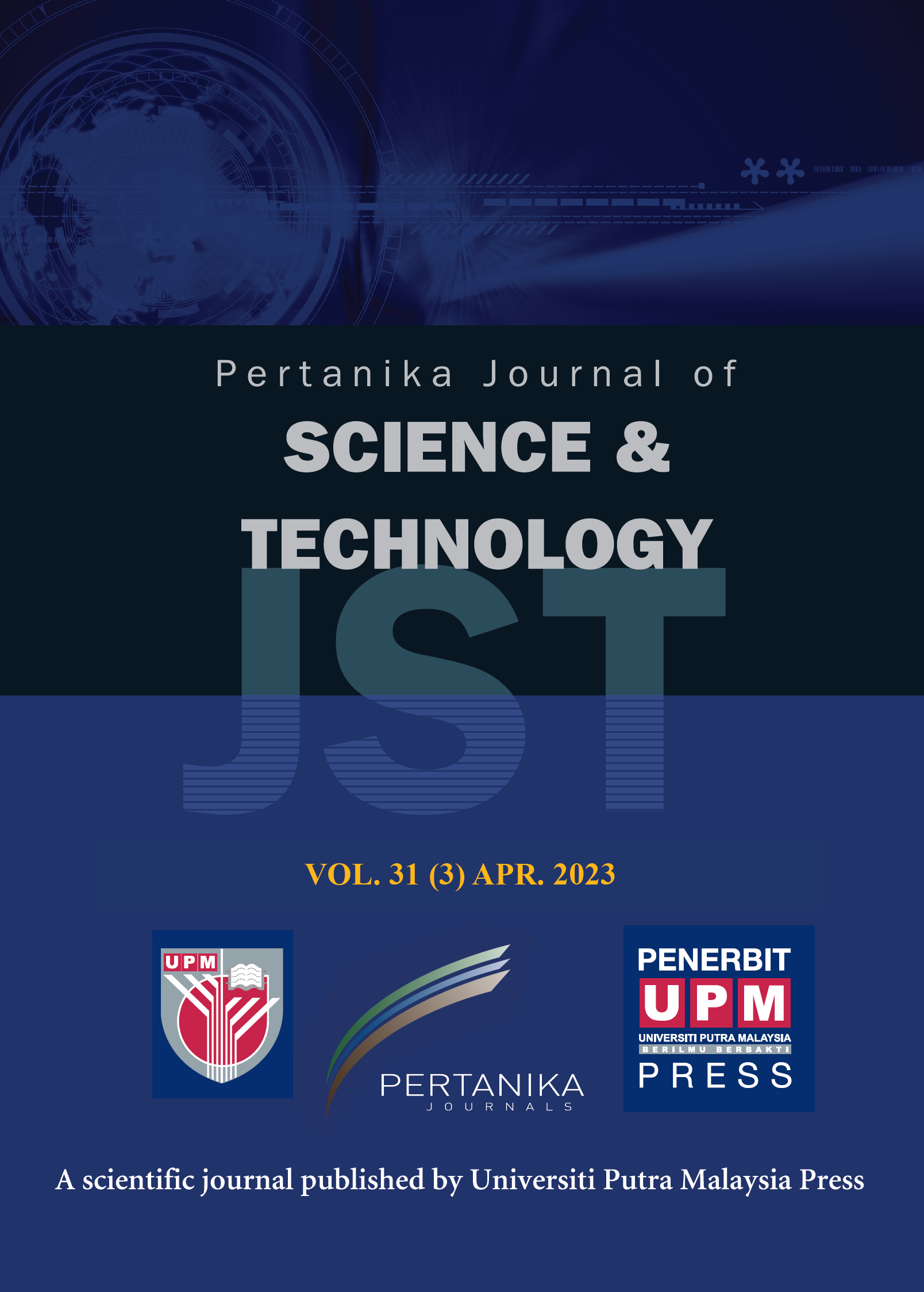
- Discipline: Multidisciplinary
- Language: English
- Edited by: Thariq Hameed Sultan

Publication details
- History: 1993–present
- Publisher: UPM Press
- Frequency: Bimonthly
- Open access: Yes
- License: Creative Commons Attribution-NonCommercial-NoDerivatives 4.0 International License
- Impact factor: 0.6 (2022)

Standard abbreviations
- ISO 4: Pertanika J. Sci. Technol.

Indexing
- ISSN: 0128-7680 (print); 2231-8526 (web)
- OCLC no.: 37437975

Links
- Journal homepage; Online archive

The Pertanika Journal of Science & Technology is a multidisciplinary peer-reviewed open-access scientific journal published by UPM Press of University of Putra Malaysia. The journal focuses on issues pertaining to science and engineering. The editor-in-chief is Mohamed Thariq Hameed Sultan (Universiti of Putra Malaysia).

== History ==
The journal was part of the journal Pertanika, which was established in 1978. In 1993 this journal was split into three more specialized ones: Pertanika Journal of Tropical Agricultural Science, Pertanika Journal of Social Sciences & Humanities, and Pertanika Journal of Science & Technology.

== Abstracting and indexing ==
The journal is abstracted and indexed in:

- CAB Abstracts
- EBSCO databases
- Emerging Sources Citation Index
- Scopus

According to the Journal Citation Reports, the journal has a 2022 impact factor of 0.6.
