= Khaw Kok Chin =

Malaysian police officer (born 1965)

Yang Berbahagia Dato' Seri Khaw Kok Chin DGPN DIMP PSBS PGPP JSM SAP SMP SDK PMP BCN PSPP KMN AMK PKT PPA
- 许国振

Director of the Narcotics Crime Investigation Department
- In office 4 March 2024 – 15 March 2025

Personal details
- Born: 16 March 1965 (age 61) Alor Setar, Kedah, Malaysia
- Citizenship: Malaysia
- Police career
- Country: Malaysia
- Department: Royal Malaysian Police
- Service years: 1991–2025
- Rank: Commissioner of Police

Khaw Kok Chin (born 16 March 1965) is a Malaysian police officer who served as the Director of the Narcotics Crime Investigation Department of Police from March 2024 to March 2025.

== Early life ==
Khaw Kok Chin was born on 16 March 1965 in Alor Setar, Kedah.

== Police career ==
Khaw Kok Chin joined the police force on 1 December 1991.

After being promoted to Senior Assistant Commissioner, he was posted to Sarawak in June 2016 as the Commander of the General Operations Force of Sarawak Brigade for four years.

On 6 May 2020, Khaw assumed the role of Johor deputy police chief.

In 2023, Khaw assumed the post of Penang police chief. During his tenure, he has received threats from loansharks for disrupting their operations. His post was later succeeded by Hamzah Ahmad on 22 April 2024. Khaw then assumed the role of Director of the Narcotics Crime Investigation Department on 4 March 2024, becoming the first Malaysian Chinese to sit the post. He retired on 15 March 2025.

== Honours ==
- Malaysia
  - Companion of the Order of Loyalty to the Crown of Malaysia (JSM) (2022)
  - Officer of the Order of the Defender of the Realm (KMN) (2013)
  - Recipient of the General Service Medal (PPA)
  - Recipient of the 13th Yang di-Pertuan Agong Installation Medal
  - Recipient of the 14th Yang di-Pertuan Agong Installation Medal
- Royal Malaysia Police
  - Courageous Commander of the Most Gallant Police Order (PGPP) (2024)
  - Loyal Commander of the Most Gallant Police Order (PSPP)
  - Recipient of the Presentation of Police Colours Medal
- Kedah
  - Companion of the Order of Loyalty to the Royal House of Kedah (SDK) (2015)
  - Member of the Order of the Crown of Kedah (AMK) (2013)
  - Recipient of Sultan Abdul Halim Golden Jubilee Medal (2008)
  - Recipient of the Sultan Sallehuddin Installation Medal (2018)
- Pahang
  - Knight Companion of the Order of the Crown of Pahang (DIMP) – Dato' (2015)
  - Companion of the Order of Sultan Ahmad Shah of Pahang (SAP) (2008)
  - Companion of the Order of the Crown of Pahang (SMP) (2006)
- Penang
  - Commander of the Order of the Defender of State (DGPN) – Dato' Seri (2024)
  - Recipient of Distinguished Service Star (BCN) (2005)
  - Recipient of the Distinguished Conduct Medal (PKT) (2002)
- Perak
  - Commander of the Order of the Perak State Crown (PMP) (2012)
  - Recipient of the Sultan Nazrin Shah Installation Medal (2015)
- Sarawak
  - Commander of the Order of the Star of Sarawak (PSBS) – Dato (2024)
