= Pertanika Journal of Tropical Agricultural Science =

- Discipline: Tropical agriculture
- Language: English
- Edited by: Mohamed Thariq Hameed Sultan

Publication details
- History: 1978–present
- Publisher: UPM Press (Malaysia)
- Frequency: Quarterly
- Open access: Yes
- Impact factor: 0.6 (2022)

Standard abbreviations
- ISO 4: Pertanika J. Trop. Agric. Sci.

Indexing
- CODEN: PJTSE9
- ISSN: 1511-3701 (print); 2231-8542 (web)
- OCLC no.: 316259460

Links
- Journal homepage; Online archive

The Pertanika Journal of Tropical Agricultural Science is a quarterly peer-reviewed open-access scientific journal published by UPM Press (University of Putra Malaysia). It covers all aspects of tropical agriculture research and related fields. The editor-in-chief is Mohamed Thariq Hameed Sultan (Universiti Putra Malaysia)

== History ==
The journal was established in 1978. In 1992, Pertanika was split into three journals to meet the need for specialised journals in areas of study aligned with the strengths of the university. Other Pertanika series are Pertanika Journal of Science & Technology and Pertanika Journal of Social Sciences & Humanities.

== Reception ==
In 2016, the journal received a National CREAM Award from the Malaysian Government.

== Abstracting and indexing ==
The journal is abstracted and indexed in:

- Aquatic Sciences and Fisheries Abstracts
- Biological Abstracts
- BIOSIS Previews
- CAB Abstracts
- Chemical Abstracts Service
- EBSCO databases
- Emerging Sources Citation Index
- ProQuest databases
- Scopus

According to the Journal Citation Reports, the journal has a 2022 impact factor of 0.6.
