= Malaysian Checkpoints and Borders Agency =

Malaysian Checkpoints and Borders Agency Agensi Kawalan dan Perlindungan Sempadan Malaysia اڬينسي كاولن دان ڤرليندوڠن سمڤادن مليسيا
- Abbreviation: MCBA / AKPS

Agency overview
- Formed: 2024
- Employees: >6000 (2025)

Jurisdictional structure
- National agency: Malaysia
- Operations jurisdiction: Malaysia
- Primary governing body: Government of Malaysia
- Secondary governing body: Ministry of Home Affairs
- Constituting instrument: Malaysia Border Control and Protection Agency Act 2024
- General nature: Civilian police

Operational structure
- Headquarters: Putrajaya, Malaysia
- Agency executive: Mohd Shuhaily Mohd Zain, Director-General of the Malaysian Checkpoints and Borders Agency

Website
- mcba.moha.gov.my

The Malaysian Checkpoints and Borders Agency (Note: Jawi: اڬينسي كاولن دان ڤرليندوڠن سمڤادن مليسيا)) (Malay: Agensi Kawalan dan Perlindungan Sempadan Malaysia – AKPS; abbr.: MCBA) is a government agency tasked at enforcing immigration, customs, quarantine and inspection, health control and veterinary inspection under the laws of Malaysia through component agencies. The agency holds jurisdiction over the air, sea, and land entry points of Malaysia. It is governed under the Malaysia Border Control and Protection Agency Act 2024.

== History ==
AKSEM would eventually be replaced and succeed by a new agency, which is called the Malaysian Checkpoints and Borders Agency on 18 December 2024, when the Malaysia Border Control and Protection Agency Act 2024 [Act 860] officially went into effect. Under Act 860, the powers and jurisdiction of the new agency was expanded to encompass all land, sea, and air entry points of the country, unlike AKSEM, which was only tasked to control the land borders of Malaysia.

== Component agencies ==
- Malaysian Armed Forces
- Immigration Department of Malaysia
- Royal Malaysian Customs Department
- Royal Malaysia Police
- National Anti-Drugs Agency
- PERHILITAN
- Ministry of Health
- Malaysian Quarantine and Inspection Services Department

== See also ==
- List of national border guard agencies
