= Deputy Chief of Navy (Malaysia) =

Royal Malaysian Navy appointment

- Timbalan Panglima Tentera Laut تيمبلن ڤڠليما تنترا لاءوت
- Crest of Deputy Chief of Navy

- Incumbent; Vice Admiral Datuk Badarudin Taha since 13 January 2026
- Royal Malaysian Navy
- Style: Yang Berbahagia (The Honorable)
- Type: Deputy Chief
- Reports to: Chief of Navy
- Term length: Not fixed
- Formation: 1 September 1967
- First holder: Commodore K. Thanabalasingam
- Salary: JUSA A
- Website: www.navy.mil.my - Deputy Chief of Navy

The Deputy Chief of Navy (Malay: Timbalan Panglima Tentera Laut) is the senior appointment in the Royal Malaysian Navy and has been held by a three-star officer in the rank of vice admiral since 2000. The Deputy Chief of Navy directly reports to the Chief of Navy.

The current Deputy Chief of Navy is Vice Admiral Datuk Badarudin Taha who succeeded Vice Admiral Dato' Pahlawan Shamsuddin Ludin on 13 January 2026.

== Appointees ==
No.	Portrait	Name (born–died)	Term of office			Ref.
No.	Portrait	Name (born–died)	Took office	Left office	Time in office	Ref.
1		Commodore Dato'; K. Thanabalasingam (born 1936)	1 September 1967	30 November 1967	90 days	
2		Commodore Dato'; Mohd Zain Mohd Salleh (born 1935)	1 February 1971	31 December 1976	5 years, 334 days	
3		Rear Admiral Dato'; Abdul Wahab Nawi (born 1939)	7 February 1977	31 January 1986	8 years, 358 days	
4		Rear Admiral Dato'; Haron Mohd Salleh (–)	22 May 1986	6 January 1988	1 year, 229 days	
5		Rear Admiral Dato'; Mohd Shariff Ishak (1941–2000)	7 January 1988	31 October 1990	2 years, 115 days	
6		Rear Admiral Dato'; Yaacob Daud (–)	1 November 1990	26 February 1991	117 days	
7		Rear Admiral Dato'; Ahmad Ramli Mohd Nor (born 1943)	27 February 1991	1 March 1994	3 years, 2 days	
8		Rear Admiral Dato'; Abdul Khalid Mohd Said (–)	2 March 1994	18 June 1995	1 year, 108 days	
9		Rear Admiral Dato'; Ahmad Ramli Mohd Nor (born 1943)	19 June 1995	12 October 1995	115 days	
10		Rear Admiral Dato'; Abu Bakar Abdul Jamal (born 1946)	13 October 1995	14 October 1998	3 years, 1 day	
11		Rear Admiral Datuk; Mohd Hussin Tamby (–)	15 October 1998	7 December 1999	1 year, 53 days	
12		Vice Admiral Datuk; Mohd Ramly Abu Bakar (born 1948)	8 December 1999	12 August 2002	2 years, 247 days	
13		Vice Admiral Dato'; Mohd Anwar Mohd Nor (born 1950)	13 August 2002	12 August 2003	364 days	
14		Vice Admiral Datuk; Ilyas Din (1951–2018)	13 August 2003	27 April 2005	1 year, 257 days	
15		Vice Admiral Datuk; Ramlan Mohamed Ali (born 1952)	30 April 2005	14 November 2006	1 year, 198 days	
16		Vice Admiral Datuk; Abdul Aziz Jaafar (born 1956)	15 November 2006	31 March 2008	1 year, 290 days	
17		Vice Admiral Dato' Indera; Mohammed Noordin Ali (born 1954)	1 April 2008	14 November 2013	5 years, 227 days	
18		Vice Admiral Dato' Seri Panglima; Ahmad Kamarulzaman Ahmad Badaruddin (born 1959)	15 November 2013	17 November 2015	2 years, 2 days	
19		Vice Admiral Dato'; Anuwi Hassan (1959–2018)	18 November 2015	12 July 2018	2 years, 236 days	
20		Vice Admiral Dato' Pahlawan; Mohd Reza Mohd Sany (born 1963)	13 July 2018	29 November 2018	139 days	
21		Vice Admiral Datuk; Khairul Anuar Yahya (born 1960)	30 November 2018	1 November 2019	336 days	
22		Vice Admiral Datuk; Abdul Rahman Ayob (born 1964)	2 November 2019	26 January 2023	3 years, 85 days	
23		Vice Admiral Datuk; Sabri Zali (born 1967)	27 January 2023	10 August 2023	195 days	
24		Vice Admiral Datuk; Zulhelmy Ithnain (born 1968)	11 August 2023	22 September 2024	1 year, 42 days	
25		Vice Admiral Dato' Pahlawan; Shamsuddin Ludin (born 1968)	19 November 2024	12 January 2026	1 year, 54 days	
26		Vice Admiral Datuk; Badarudin Taha (born 1967)	13 January 2026	Incumbent	256 days	

== See also ==
- Royal Malaysian Navy
- Chief of Navy (Malaysia)
