= Zulhelmy Ithnain =

Chief of Navy (Malaysia)

Yang Berbahagia Admiral Tan Sri Zulhelmy Ithnain PGAT PSM PJN PSAT DPMS DSPN PAT JMN SIS KAT PPS PPA PJM
- ذوالحلمي اثنين
- Zulhelmy in 2025

Chief of Navy
- Incumbent
- Assumed office 1 August 2024; Acting: 1 August 2024 – 22 September 2024
- Monarch: Ibrahim Iskandar
- Minister: Mohamed Khaled Nordin
- Deputy: Shamsuddin Ludin
- Preceded by: Abdul Rahman Ayob

Acting Chief of Defence Force
- In office 27 December 2025 – 31 January 2026
- Monarch: Ibrahim Iskandar
- Minister: Mohamed Khaled Nordin
- Preceded by: Mohd Nizam Jaffar
- Succeeded by: Malek Razak Sulaiman

Deputy Chief of Navy
- In office 11 August 2023 – 22 September 2024
- Monarchs: Abdullah (2023–2024); Ibrahim Iskandar (since 2024)
- Minister: Mohamad Hasan (11 August–12 December 2023); Mohamed Khaled Nordin (since 2023)
- Chief of Navy: Abdul Rahman Ayob (until August 2024)
- Preceded by: Sabri Zali
- Succeeded by: Shamsuddin Ludin

Personal details
- Born: 2 January 1968 (age 58) Kampung Datuk Keramat, Kuala Lumpur, Malaysia

Military service
- Allegiance: Malaysia
- Branch/service: Royal Malaysian Navy
- Years of service: 1986–present
- Rank: Admiral
- Battles/wars: Second Malayan Emergency

Zulhelmy bin Ithnain (born 2 January 1968) is a Malaysian navy officer who has served as Chief of Royal Malaysian Navy since 1 August 2024. He served in the position in an acting capacity from 1 August to 22 September 2024. Prior to his appointment, he previously served as the President of the National Defence Education Centre (PUSPAHANAS) from October 2022 to August 2023.

== Navy career ==
Zulhelmy joined the Royal Malaysian Navy as an Officer Cadet on 6 August 1986, and was commissioned as a Sub Lieutenant on 1988.

Among the positions he had held throughout his service include Commander of KD Tunku Abdul Rahman, Commander of RMN Submarine Training Centre and was both deputy commander and subsequently commander of RMN Submarine Force. He also served as Assistant Chief of Naval Sataff of Command, Planning and Development and then served as Commander of RMN Naval Region I in Tanjung Gelang, Kuantan, Pahang before being appointed as President of National Defence Education Centre in 2022.

Zulhelmy was appointed as Deputy Chief of Navy on 11 August 2023, who succeeding Sabri Zali who appointed as President of National Defence Education Centre. In August 2024, he appointed as Acting Chief of the Navy following the retirement of his predecessor Abdul Rahman Ayob.

Zulhelmy was appointed as Chief of Navy on 23 September 2024.

== Honours ==
=== Honours of Malaysia ===
- Malaysia
  - Commander of the Order of Loyalty to the Crown of Malaysia (PSM) – Tan Sri (2025)
  - Commander of the Order of Meritorious Service (PJN) – Datuk (2024)
  - Companion of the Order of the Defender of the Realm (JMN) (2022)
  - Recipient of the Loyal Service Medal (PPS)
  - Recipient of the General Service Medal (PPA)
  - Recipient of the 13th Yang di-Pertuan Agong Installation Medal
  - Recipient of the 17th Yang di-Pertuan Agong Installation Medal
- Malaysian Armed Forces
  - Courageous Commander of the Most Gallant Order of Military Service (PGAT) (2024)
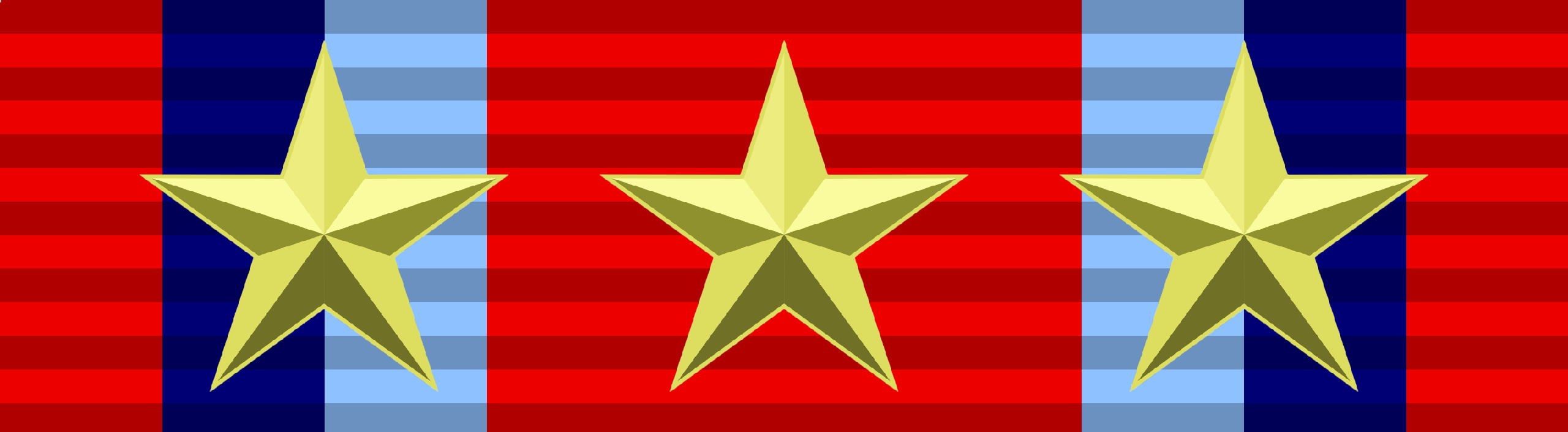
  - Loyal Commander of the Most Gallant Order of Military Service (PSAT) (2021)
  - Warrior of the Most Gallant Order of Military Service (PAT)
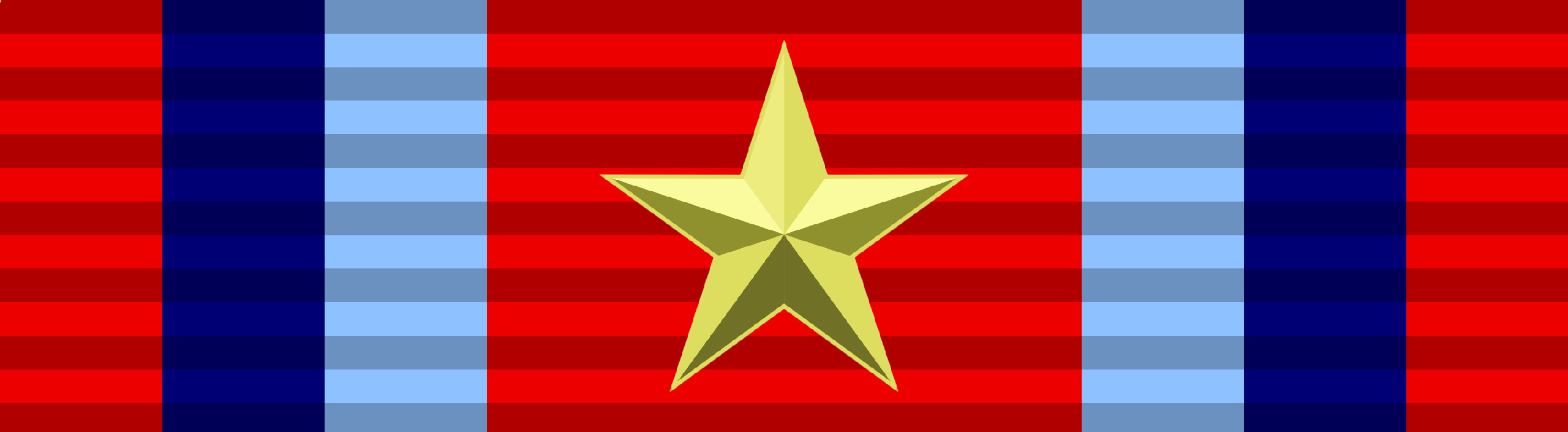
  - Officer of the Most Gallant Order of Military Service (KAT)
  - Recipient of the Malaysian Service Medal (PJM)
- Penang
  - Officer of the Order of the Defender of State (DSPN) – Dato' (2018)
- Selangor
  - Knight Commander of the Order of the Crown of Selangor (DPMS) – Dato' (2021)
  - Companion of the Order of Sultan Sharafuddin Idris Shah (SIS) (2009)
  - Recipient of the Sultan Salahuddin Silver Jubilee Medal

=== Foreign honours ===
- France :
  - Chevalier of the Legion of Honour
