= Radin Umar Radin Sohadi =

Malaysian academic

Yang Berbahagia Dato' Radin Umar Radin Sohadi DPMS DPMP PCM

6th Vice-Chancellor of the Universiti Putra Malaysia
- In office 1 January 2011 – 31 December 2012
- Chancellor: Sharafuddin of Selangor
- Preceded by: Nik Mustapha Raja Abdullah
- Succeeded by: Mohd Fauzi Ramlan

Director-General of Higher Education
- In office 2 June 2008 – 31 December 2010
- Preceded by: Hassan Said
- Succeeded by: Rujhan Mustafa

Director-General of MIROS
- In office 3 January 2007 – 31 May 2008
- Preceded by: Office established
- Succeeded by: Ahmad Farhan Mohd Sadullah

Personal details
- Born: 13 November 1960 Kampung Hulu Chemor, Perak
- Died: 13 October 2013 (aged 52) Hospital Serdang, Selangor
- Cause of death: Liver failure
- Spouse: Norsham Ahmad
- Children: 5
- Education: University of Sheffield (BEng); University of Sheffield (MEng); University of Birmingham (PhD)

Radin Umar bin Radin Sohadi is a Malaysian academic administrator. He was the first Director-General of Malaysian Institute of Road Safety Research (MIROS) when the agency established in 2007. From 2008 to 2010, he was appointed as the second Director-General of Higher Education, succeed Hassan Said. Then, he served as the 6th Vice-Chancellor of Universiti Putra Malaysia from 1 January 2011 until 31 December 2012. He resigned from the office due to health issue.

== Education background ==
After studied at the Sekolah Aminuddin Baki Chemor, Radin Umar joined Royal Military College before furthered his study in United Kingdom. He completed Bachelor and Master in Engineering, both from University of Sheffield in year 1984 and 1985 respectively. Then, he obtained PhD in engineering from University of Birmingham in 1996, specialisation in "Accident Diagnostic Systems".

== Career ==
Started from 1985, Radin Umar was a lecturer in the Faculty of Engineering in UPM, and then he served as Dean of the faculty from 1999 until 2004. In the year between 2005 and 2006, he held the post as Deputy Vice-Chancellor (Academic and International Relations) of UPM.

Upon the establishment of Malaysian Institute of Road Safety Research (MIROS) in 2007, he was appointed as the first Director-General, and later succeed by Ahmad Farhan Mohd Sadullah. His leave opened up another path for his career, as he was appointed as second Director-General of the Department of Higher Education in 2008. Few years later, he back to UPM and served as the Vice-Chancellor until his resignation in the end of 2012.

== Honours ==
- Perak
  - Knight Commander of the Order of the Perak State Crown (DPMP) – Dato' (2008)
  - Commander of the Order of Cura Si Manja Kini (PCM) (2003)
- Selangor
  - Knight Commander of the Order of the Crown of Selangor (DPMS) – Dato' (2011)

Academic offices
Preceded by Nik Mustapha Raja Abdullah	Vice-Chancellor of the Universiti Putra Malaysia; 2011 – 2012	Succeeded by Mohd Fauzi Ramlan
Government offices
Preceded by Hassan Said	Director-General of the Higher Education; 2008 – 2010	Succeeded by Rujhan Mustafa
Preceded by Office established	Director-General of the Malaysian Institute of Road Safety Research; 2007 – 2008	Succeeded by Ahmad Farhan Mohd Sadullah
