= Mohd Nizam Jaffar =

Malaysian general (born 1966)

Yang Berbahagia General Tan Sri Mohd Nizam Jaffar PGAT PMN PSD SPKK SSPK SPTS DGSM PSAT DSDK PMW PAT SMP SDK KMN BCK PPS PPA PJM PNBB
- محمد نظام جاففر
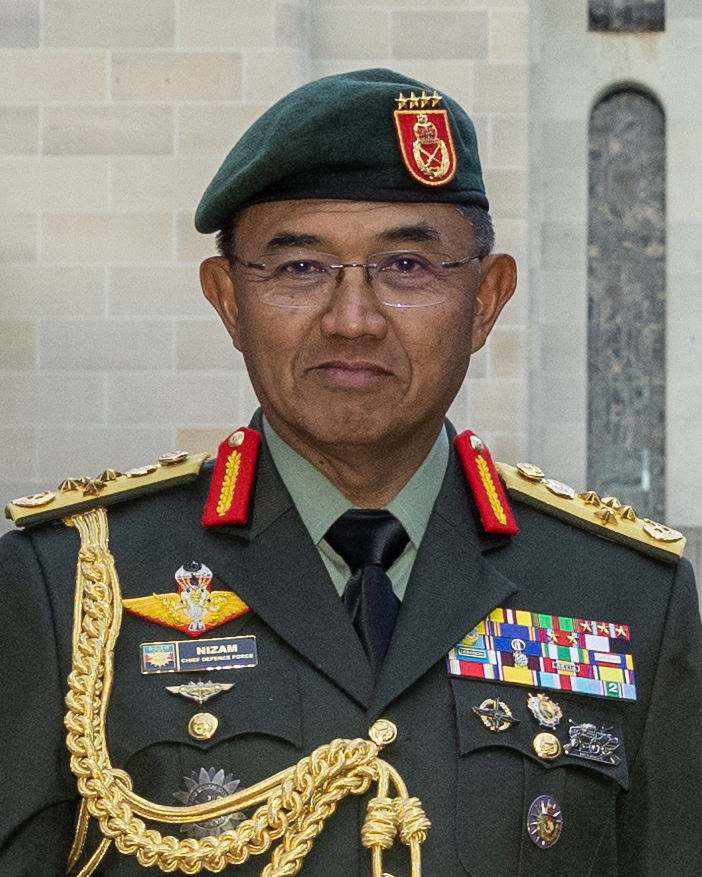
- Mohd Nizam in 2025

23rd Chief of Defence Forces
- In office 31 January 2025 – 27 December 2025
- Monarch: Ibrahim Iskandar
- Minister: Mohamed Khaled Nordin
- Preceded by: Mohammad Ab Rahman
- Succeeded by: Zulhelmy Ithnain (acting)

Personal details
- Born: Mohd Nizam bin Jaffar; 3 August 1966 (age 60) Johor Bahru, Johor, Malaysia
- Spouse: Risia Sheikh Ali Omar Bajarai
- Children: 1
- Education: Royal Military Academy Sandhurst
- Alma mater: University of Nottingham (MBA)
- Occupation: Military officer

Military service
- Allegiance: Malaysia
- Branch/service: Malaysian Army
- Rank: General
- Unit: Royal Malay Regiment
- Commands: Chief of Defence Forces; Assistant Chief of Staff for Personnel Services; MALBATT 2; 2nd Infantry Brigade
- Battles/wars: Second Malayan Emergency

Mohd Nizam bin Jaffar (Jawi: محمد نظام بن جاففر; born 3 August 1966) is a Malaysian military officer who served as the 23rd Chief of Defence Forces from January 2025 to December 2025.

== Early life and education ==
Mohd Nizam bin Jaffar was born on 3 August 1966 in Johor Bahru, Johor, Malaysia. He received his early education at the Royal Military Academy Sandhurst. He also successfully completed his professional military education at the National Resilience College (MKN), National Defense Studies Center (PUSPAHANAS), Putrajaya in 2020 where he successfully won The National Resilience College (NRC) Award by the NRC Directing Staff Council. He has a Master of Business Administration (MBA) from the University of Nottingham and was awarded as a Fellow Scholar of the National Defence University of Malaysia (UPNM).

Mohd Nizam also created history as the first senior Malaysian Army officer to be selected to attend the Global Peace Operations Initiative (GPOI) Peace Support Operations Contingent Commander Course in Monterey, California, United States. Mohd Nizam also completed the Command and General Staff Course at the United States Army Command and General Staff College in Fort Leavenworth, Kansas, USA, and entered the Le Collège Interarmées de Défense in France.

== Military career ==
Mohd Nizam's career in the military field began as a platoon leader in the 19th Battalion of the Royal Malay Regiment (Mechanized), where he took part in the Second Malayan Emergency, and afterwards served as aide de camp first to the deputy chief of the Army (1989 to 1990), and later to the Chief of the Defence Forces General Tun Tan Sri Mohamed Hashim Mohd Ali (1990 to 1992). He also served as aide de camp to the 14th Yang di-Pertuan Agong Abdul Halim of Kedah from 2011 to 2016.

Mohd Nizam commanded various infantry units and later held a training management position, serving as the commander of the 2nd Infantry Brigade based at Ipoh and subsequently as the director of training management at the Army Training and Doctrine Command Headquarters (MPLDTD) at Port Dickson. Afterwards, he served as MKN commander, Pusat Pengajian Pertahanan Nasional (PUSPAHANAS) at Putrajaya. Mohd Nizam was later appointed commander of the Malaysian Battalion (MALBATT) 2 based in Lebanon as part of the Malaysian contingent under the United Nations Interim Force in Lebanon (UNIFIL). After his term in Lebanon, Mohd Nizam was later named as the Assistant Chief of Staff for Personnel Services (AKS PA) at the Malaysian Armed Forces Headquarters, under the Member Services Division (MK ATM - BPA), and was later promoted to the rank of lieutenant general.

On 31 January 2025, Mohd Nizam was appointed the 23rd Chief of Defence Forces, succeeding General Mohammad Ab Rahman. His appointment is a historic departure from tradition, as it saw the armed forces chief not selected from the current chiefs of the three branches, which is the army, navy, and air force. Following his appointment as the military's top leadership, he was promoted from Lieutenant-General to General.

In January 2026, Mohd Nizam resigned as Chief of Defence Force following an investigation into alleged irregularities in several defence procurement deals. On 22 January, he was charged by the Malaysian Anti-Corruption Commission with abuse of power and criminal breach of trust in relation to the procurement scandal.

== Personal life ==
Mohd Nizam is married to Risia Sheikh Ali Omar Bajarai. They have one child.

== Honours ==
=== Honours of Malaysia ===
- Malaysia
  - Commander of the Order of the Defender of the Realm (PMN) – Tan Sri (2025)
  - Commander of the Order of Loyalty to the Royal Family of Malaysia (PSD) – Datuk (2014)
  - Officer of the Order of the Defender of the Realm (KMN) (2010)
  - Recipient of the Loyal Service Medal (PPS) (Note: Serving no less than 18 years.)
  - Recipient of the General Service Medal (PPA) (Note: Serving no less than 10 years.)
  - Recipient of the United Nations Missions Service Medal (PNBB) with "LEBANON" clasp
  - Recipient of the 14th Yang di-Pertuan Agong Installation Medal (2012)
  - Recipient of the 15th Yang di-Pertuan Agong Installation Medal (2017)
  - Recipient of the 16th Yang di-Pertuan Agong Installation Medal (2019)
  - Recipient of the 17th Yang di-Pertuan Agong Installation Medal (2024)
- Malaysian Armed Forces
  - Courageous Commander of the Most Gallant Order of Military Service (PGAT) (2025)
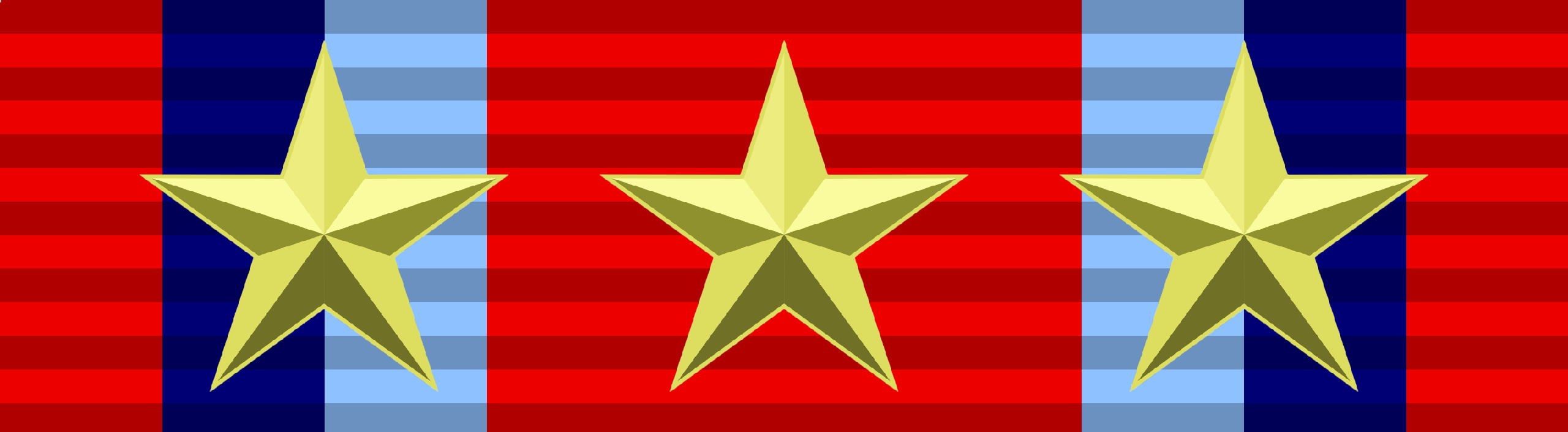
  - Loyal Commander of the Most Gallant Order of Military Service (PSAT)
  - Warrior of the Most Gallant Order of Military Service (PAT)
  - Recipient of the Malaysian Service Medal (PJM)
- Federal Territory (Malaysia)
  - Commander of the Order of the Territorial Crown (PMW) – Datuk (2012)
- Johor
  - Recipient of Sultan Ibrahim Ismail Coronation Medal (2015)
- Kedah
  - Knight Grand Commander of the Glorious Order of the Loyal Warrior of Kedah (SSPK) – Dato' Seri Pahlawan (2025)
  - Knight Companion of the Order of Loyalty to the Royal House of Kedah (DSDK) – Dato' (2014)
  - Companion of the Order of Loyalty to the Royal House of Kedah (SDK) (2008)
  - State of Kedah Distinguished Service Star (BCK) (2002)
- Kelantan
  - Knight Grand Commander of the Order of the Noble Crown of Kelantan (SPKK) – Dato' (2025)
- Malacca
  - Grand Commander of the Exalted Order of Malacca (DGSM) – Datuk Seri (2025)
- Pahang
  - Companion of the Order of the Crown of Pahang (SMP) (2005)
- Perak
  - Knight Grand Commander of the Order of Taming Sari (SPTS) – Dato' Seri Panglima (2025)

=== Foreign honours ===
- Cambodia
  - Grand Cross of the Royal Order of Sahametrei (2025)
- United Nations
  - Recipient of the UNIFIL Medal with "2" award numeral
