= Ilyas Din =

13th Chief of Navy (Malaysia)

Yang Berbahagia Admiral (Rtd) Tan Sri Ilyas Din PGAT PSM PJN SIMP SPTS DHMS PSAT DPMS DIMP DPTS DSDK PAT JSM SMK KAT KMN AMK PPS PPA
- الياس دين

13th Chief of Navy
- In office 28 April 2005 – 14 November 2006
- Monarch: Sirajuddin
- Prime Minister: Abdullah Ahmad Badawi
- Minister of Defence: Najib Razak
- Preceded by: Mohd Anwar Mohd Nor
- Succeeded by: Ramlan Mohamed Ali

Personal details
- Born: 12 March 1951 Alor Setar, Kedah, Federation of Malaya
- Died: 6 July 2018 (aged 67) Kampung Datuk Keramat, Kuala Lumpur, Malaysia
- Spouse: Meryam Harun
- Children: 3
- Education: Royal Military College, Kuala Lumpur; Britannia Royal Naval College; University of Warwick

Military service
- Allegiance: Malaysia
- Branch/service: Royal Malaysian Navy
- Years of service: 1972–2006
- Rank: Admiral (Malay: Laksamana)

Ilyas bin Hj Din (Jawi: الياس بن حاج دين; 12 March 1951 – 6 July 2018), was a Malaysian military officer who served as the 13th Chief of Royal Malaysian Navy from April 2005 to November 2006.

== Early life and education ==
Ilyas was born on 12 March 1951 in Alor Setar, Kedah as the first son of Din Ahmad and Com Jaafar.

He received his primary education at Kandut Malay School in Alor Setar and his secondary education at Kolej Sultan Abdul Hamid. In 1968, he joined he joined the Malaysian Armed Forces at the Royal Military College, Sungai Besi Camp before being selected to undergo Overseas Officer Cadet Training at the Britannia Royal Naval College in 1970 and he completed his training in 1972.

He also graduated Diploma in Engineering Business Management from University of Warwick.

== Military career ==
He was commissioned to Acting sub-lieutenant on 1 January 1972 and he was appointed as the Acting Officer of KD Sri Sarawak on 27 April 1972 shortly after his return to Malaysia. After that, he held several positions, including as Commanding officer of KD Sri Selangor in 1975, KD Ganas then KD Gempita in 1980 and KD Hang Tuah in 1986. He also had been assigned as Branch Head of Officer Training, Captain of Training also the Commanding Officer of RMN Education and Training Command. Then he served as Commander of Naval Region I and he served as Commander of RMN Fleet Command in 2000.

During his tenure as the Commander of RMN Fleet Command, he successfully led the RMN Fleet Command HQ to achieve several quality awards at both the navy and ministry levels. He was also a driving factor that brought success to the Fleet Headquarters in obtaining the MS ISO 9001:2000 certification on 30 May 2003. With success after success achieved, he is nicknamed the 'Father of Quality' of the Royal Malaysian Navy. He was also responsible for instilling quality management values and applying the 'Balanced Scorecard' to measure the performance of each unit within the navy.

After serving as Commander of RMN Fleet Command, he appointed as Deputy Chief of Navy on 13 August 2003 and then he appointed as the 13th Chief of Navy on 28 April 2005 following appointment his predecessor Mohd Anwar Mohd Nor as the 15th Chief of Defence Forces. The position he held until his retirement on 14 November 2006 and succeeded by Ramlan Mohamed Ali.

== Personal life ==
He was married with Meryam binti Harun on 24 February 1978 and blessed with one son and two daughters.

== Death ==
Ilyas died at around 10:10 pm on 6 July 2018 at his residence in Kampung Datuk Keramat, Kuala Lumpur after nine days following a heart attack due to kidney complications and receiving dialysis treatment before being brought home and taking his last breath. Then the next morning, he was buried at Raudhatul Sakinah Muslim Cemetery in Selayang.

== Honours ==
=== Honours of Malaysia ===
- Malaysia
  - Commander of the Order of Loyalty to the Crown of Malaysia (PSM) – Tan Sri (2006)
  - Commander of the Order of Meritorious Service (PJN) – Datuk (2004)
  - Companion of the Order of Loyalty to the Crown of Malaysia (JSM) (2000)
  - Officer of the Order of the Defender of the Realm (KMN) (1993)
  - Recipient of the Loyal Service Medal (PPS)
  - Recipient of the General Service Medal (PPA)
  - Recipient of the 10th Yang di-Pertuan Agong Installation Medal
- Malaysian Armed Forces
  - Courageous Commander of the Most Gallant Order of Military Service (PGAT)
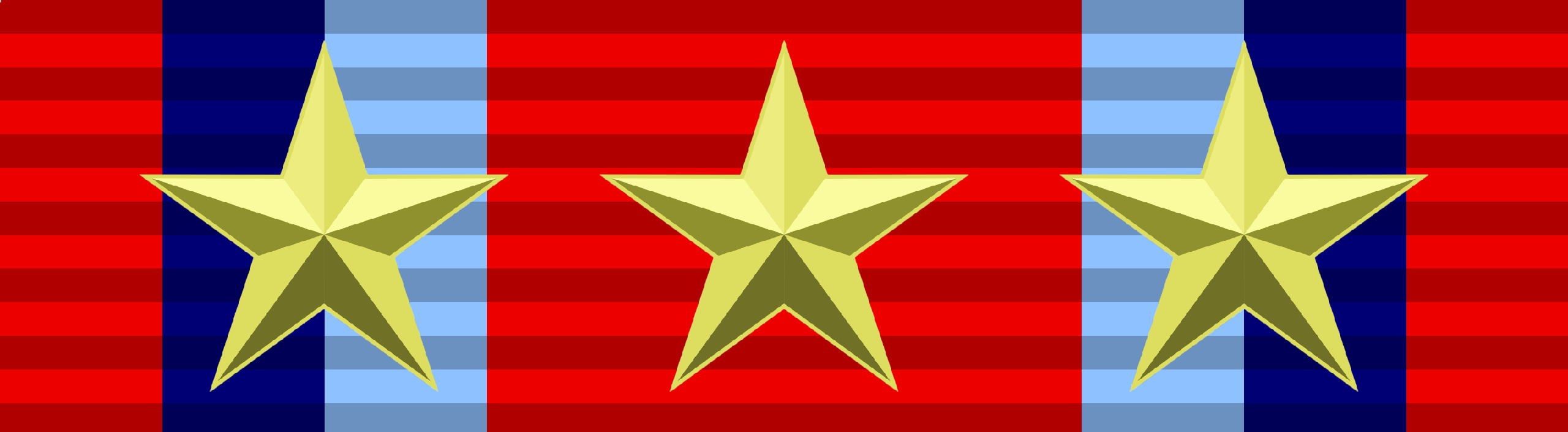
  - Loyal Commander of the Most Gallant Order of Military Service (PSAT) (2001)
  - Warrior of the Most Gallant Order of Military Service (PAT)
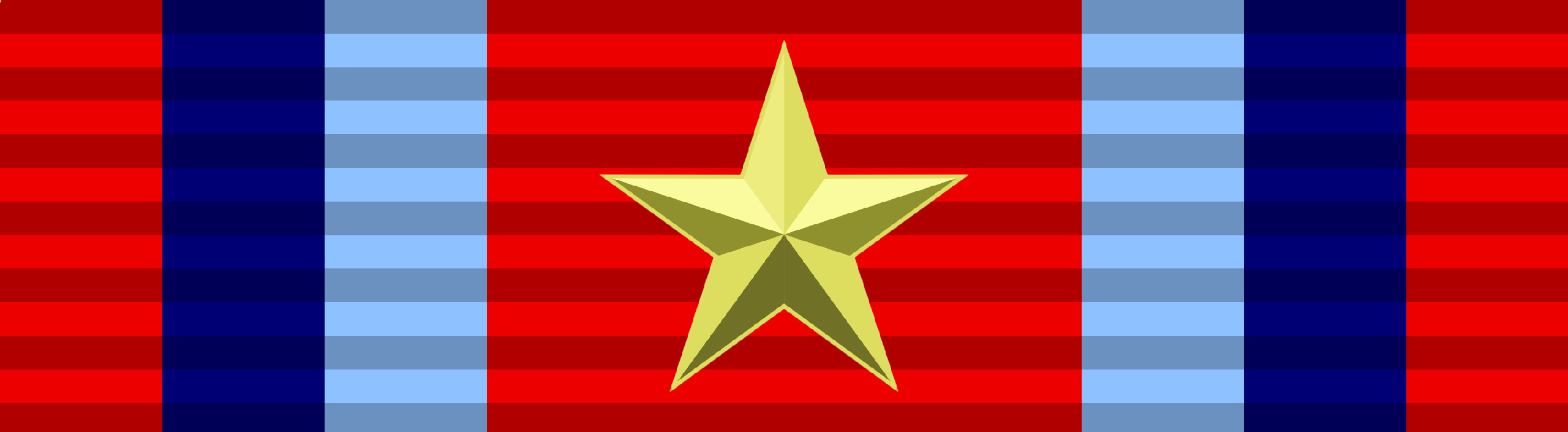
  - Officer of the Most Gallant Order of Military Service (KAT)
- Kedah
  - Knight Commander of the Order of Loyalty to Sultan Abdul Halim Mu'adzam Shah (DHMS) – Dato' Paduka (2006)
  - Knight Companion of the Order of Loyalty to the Royal House of Kedah (DSDK) – Dato' (1999)
  - Companion of the Order of the Crown of Kedah (SMK) (1997)
  - Member of the Order of the Crown of Kedah (AMK) (1991)
- Pahang
  - Knight Grand Companion of the Order of the Crown of Pahang (SIMP) – formerly Dato', now Dato' Indera (2004)
  - Knight Companion of the Order of the Crown of Pahang (DIMP) – Dato' (1999)
- Perak
  - Knight Grand Commander of the Order of Taming Sari (SPTS) – Dato' Seri Panglima (2006)
  - Knight Commander of the Order of Taming Sari (DPTS) – Dato' Pahlawan (2003)
- Selangor
  - Knight Commander of the Order of the Crown of Selangor (DPMS) – Dato' (2003)
  - Recipient of the Sultan Salahuddin Silver Jubilee Medal (1985)

=== Foreign honours ===
- Thailand
  - Knight Grand Cross of the Order of the Crown of Thailand (PM) (2006)
