= Mohd Fauzi Ramlan =

Malaysian academic

Yang Berbahagia Dato' Mohd Fauzi Ramlan DPMS DMSM JSM

7th Vice-Chancellor of the Universiti Putra Malaysia
- In office 1 January 2013 – 31 December 2015
- Chancellor: Sharafuddin of Selangor
- Preceded by: Radin Umar Radin Sohadi
- Succeeded by: Aini Ideris

Personal details
- Born: 15 October 1960 (age 65) Kota Tinggi, Johor
- Education: Iowa State University (BSc); Louisiana State University (MSc); University of York (PhD)

Mohd Fauzi bin Ramlan is a Malaysian academic administrator. He served as the 7th Vice-Chancellor of Universiti Putra Malaysia from 1 January 2013 until 31 December 2015. Currently he is the chairman of UPM Holdings.

== Education background ==
Mohd Fauzi started his primary education at Sekolah Kebangsaan Bukit Lintang in Kota Tinggi, and later entering the residential school, Sekolah Dato' Abdul Razak (SDAR) in Seremban for his secondary education. After he finished the Diploma in Agriculture from UPM, he further his study and obtained a Bachelor of Science in Agronomy from Iowa State University, a Master of Science from Louisiana State University, and a PhD in Biology from the University of York.

== Career ==
With his educational background, Mohd Fauzi was served as professor of UPM since 29 April 1986. In addition, he was once a member of the Board of Directors (BOD) of Universiti Utara Malaysia, and a substitute member of BOD for National University of Malaysia.

Before he appointed as Vice-Chancellor of UPM, he was the Deputy vice Chancellor (Student Affairs and Alumni) of UPM since 16 May 2010.

== Honour ==
=== Honour of Malaysia ===
- Malaysia
  - Companion of the Order of Loyalty to the Crown of Malaysia (JSM) (2009)
- Malacca
  - Companion Class I of the Exalted Order of Malacca (DMSM) – Datuk (2011)
- Selangor
  - Knight Commander of the Order of the Crown of Selangor (DPMS) – Dato' (2013)

Academic offices
Preceded by Radin Umar Radin Sohadi	Vice-Chancellor of the Universiti Putra Malaysia; 2013 – 2015	Succeeded by Aini Ideris
