= Abu Bakar Abdul Jamal =

Malaysian commander

Yang Berbahagia Admiral (Rtd) Tan Sri Dato' Seri Abu Bakar Abdul Jamal PGAT PSM SPMJ SPMS SPTS DPMJ DIMP DPTS PAT JMN SMJ KMN

10th Chief of Navy
- In office 15 October 1998 – 12 August 2001
- Preceded by: Ahmad Ramli Mohd Nor
- Succeeded by: Mohd Ramly Abu Bakar

Personal details
- Born: 13 November 1946 (age 79) Johor, Malayan Union
- Awards: Panglima Mangku Negara (PMN)

Military service
- Allegiance: Malaysia
- Branch/service: Royal Malaysian Navy
- Years of service: 1965–2002
- Rank: Admiral (Malay: Laksamana)
- Commands: Chief of Royal Malaysian Navy
- service number: N400230

Abu Bakar bin Abdul Jamal was the tenth Chief and the first four-star Admiral of the Royal Malaysian Navy (RMN).

Abu Bakar served for nearly 40 years in the RMN and held various positions and ranks. He was commanding officer of several RMN ship including patrol ship, destroyers (missile) and corvettes. Between 1981 and 1984, bu Bakar was made senior officer for the Corvette Project Team in Kiel, Germany. He later held the position of Assistant Chief of Navy (Human Resource) and Deputy Chief of Navy in 1996. Admiral Abu Bakar became the Chief of Navy on 15 October 1998 and was elevated to the rank of admiral on 1 June 2000. He retired in 2002.

Besides the various Malaysian awards and medals, Abu Bakar was also awarded the Bintang Jalasena Utama by Indonesia and the Legion of Merit (degree of commander) by the United States of America.

== Early life ==
He was born on 13 November 1946 in Johor, Malaysia and received his early education at the Royal Military College in Sungai Besi, Kuala Lumpur. Abu Bakar joined the naval service in 1965 and commenced training as a cadet at the Britannia Royal Naval College, United Kingdom. Abu Bakar was trained in weapons engineering at HMS Excellent School of Weapons Engineering, United Kingdom. He was also trained in Training Technology by the Royal Australian Navy. Abu Bakar is also a graduate of the Royal Naval College, Greenwich, United Kingdom and the Naval Postgraduate School, Monterey, California, where he studied Defence Management. He went on to enrol in a fellowship programme at the Wolfson College, Cambridge and later studied at the Royal College of Defence Studies, United Kingdom.

== Family ==
Abu Bakar is married to Kamariyah binti Buang and they have three children.

== Honours ==
- Malaysia
  - Commander of the Order of Loyalty to the Crown of Malaysia (PSM) – Tan Sri (2001)
  - Companion of the Order of the Defender of the Realm (JMN) (1996)
  - Officer of the Order of the Defender of the Realm (KMN) (1982)
  - Member of the Order of the Defender of the Realm (AMN) (1977)
- Malaysian Armed Forces
  - Courageous Commander of the Most Gallant Order of Military Service (PGAT) (1999)
- Johor
  - Knight Grand Commander of the Order of the Crown of Johor (SPMJ) – Dato' (2000)
  - Knight Commander of the Order of the Crown of Johor (DPMJ) – Dato' (1998)
- Pahang
  - Knight Companion of the Order of the Crown of Pahang (DIMP) – Dato' (1991)
- Perak
  - Knight Grand Commander of the Order of Taming Sari (SPTS) – Dato' Seri Panglima (1999)
  - Knight Commander of the Order of Taming Sari (DPTS) – Dato' Pahlawan (1997)

=== Foreign honour ===
- United States
  - Commander of the Legion of Merit (LOM)
- Thailand
  - Knight Grand Cross of the Order of the Crown of Thailand (PM)

Military offices
Preceded by Vice Admiral Dato' Seri Ahmad Ramli bin Mohd Noor (1995–1998)	Chief of Navy; 1998–2001	Succeeded by Admiral Datuk Mohd Ramly bin Abu Bakar (2001–2003)
