= K. Thanabalasingam =

5th Chief of Navy (Malaysia)

Yang Berbahagia Rear Admiral (Rtd) Tan Sri Dato' Seri K. Thanabalasingam PGAT PSM SPMS DIMP DPMT JMN SMJ AMN PKB PPA PPM PJM

5th Chief of Navy
- In office 1 December 1968 – 31 December 1976
- Preceded by: Allen Nelson Dollard
- Succeeded by: Mohd Zain Mohd Salleh

Military service
- Allegiance: Malaysia
- Branch/service: Royal Malaysian Navy
- Rank: Rear Admiral (Malay: Laksamana Muda)

K. Thanabalasingam was the third chief of the Royal Malaysian Navy and the first Malaysian to be appointed to the post. To date, he remains the youngest and longest serving RMN chief, as well as the only non-Malay service chief.

== Biography ==
Thanabalasingam joined the British Royal Malayan Navy, which was then under British control, in May 1955. He was sent to the Britannia Royal Naval College (BRNC) in Dartmouth, England, from which he graduated in early 1958.

He then decided to join the newly established Malayan Navy, which was fully Malayan owned and administered in late 1958. On his return to Malaya, he was appointed the first Naval Cadet Training Officer at the then Federation Military College at Port Dickson (currently the Royal Military College, Kuala Lumpur in Sungai Besi) from January 1, 1959.

By then, newly independent Malaya under Tunku Abdul Rahman's leadership had successfully negotiated with the British Government to transfer the British Royal Malayan Navy to the Malayan Government on July 1, 1958.

The British Royal Malayan Navy and all its assets (the ships, the bases and jetties and personnel) were merged with the existing Malayan Navy and from then on it became Malayan owned and administered. This new entity was named Royal Malayan Navy, and the designation “Royal” was a reference to the Yang di-Pertuan Agong.

After the trials and tribulations of the Indonesian Confrontation settled down, especially after the signing of the agreement between newly formed Malaysia and Indonesia in 1966, Tunku Abdul Rahman and his colleagues decided to Malaysianize the top posts in the navy and air force. They initially offered these posts to two senior Malaysian army generals, who declined for two main reasons. Firstly they felt that they were not professionally qualified and secondly because they did not want to jeopardise their own careers in the army.

Tunku and his cabinet then decided that they would select two officers, one from the navy and one from the air force, and appoint them chiefs of the respective services. They were fully aware of Thanabalasingam's age but decided, nevertheless, to appoint him and take the risk. This exercise created history not only because Malaysians for the first time were appointed to these two top posts but also because of his age—he was 31 years old and a bachelor.

Under Thanabalasingam and with Tunku Abdul Rahman's foresight, the Royal Malaysian Navy was gradually transformed from a coastal navy (brown water force) to an ocean-going navy (blue water navy).

At the end of 1976, he retired from the naval service as Rear Admiral at the age of 40. He ventured subsequently into private business. He currently lives in Kuala Lumpur.

== Honours ==
=== Honours of Malaysia ===
- Malaysia
  - Commander of the Order of Loyalty to the Crown of Malaysia (PSM) – Tan Sri (2007)
  - Companion of the Order of the Defender of the Realm (JMN) (1969)
  - Member of the Order of the Defender of the Realm (AMN) (1967)
  - Recipient of the Active Service Medal (PKB)
  - Recipient of the General Service Medal (PPA)
  - Recipient of the Malaysian Commemorative Medal (Silver) (PPM)
- Malaysian Armed Forces
  - Courageous Commander of the Most Gallant Order of Military Service (PGAT)
  - Recipient of the Malaysian Service Medal (PJM)
- Johor
  - Companion of the Order of the Crown of Johor (SMJ) (1969)
- Pahang
  - Knight Companion of the Order of the Crown of Pahang (DIMP) – Dato'
- Selangor
  - Knight Grand Commander of the Order of the Crown of Selangor (SPMS) – Dato' Seri (2008)
- Terengganu
  - Knight Commander of the Order of the Crown of Terengganu (DPMT) – Dato' (1970)

=== Foreign Honour ===
- Indonesia
  - Star of Jalasena, 1st Class (1970)

== See also ==
- Royal Malaysian Navy, Malaysianisation of the Navy section.

Military offices
Preceded by Commodore A.N. Dollard, RAN (1965 - 1967)	Chief of Navy; 1967-1976	Succeeded by Vice Admiral Dato' Mohd Zain bin Mohd Salleh (1977 - 1986)
