= Abdul Rahman Ayob =

18th Chief of Navy (Malaysia)

Yang Berbahagia Admiral Tan Sri Abdul Rahman Ayob PGAT PSM PJN DPMS PSAT PGDK DPSM PAT JSM KAT KMN PJM PPS PPA
- Abdul Rahman in 2023

18th Chief of Navy
- In office 27 January 2023 – 22 September 2024
- Deputy: Zulhelmy Ithnain
- Preceded by: Mohd Reza Mohd Sany
- Succeeded by: Zulhelmy Ithnain

Personal details
- Born: 2 December 1964 (age 61) Johor Bahru, Johor, Malaysia

Military service
- Allegiance: Malaysia
- Branch/service: Royal Malaysian Navy
- Years of service: 1982–present
- Rank: Admiral (Malay: Laksamana)

Yang Berbahagia Admiral Tan Sri Abdul Rahman bin Ayob (born 2 December 1964 in Johor Bahru, Johor) is a Malaysian admiral who serves as 18th Chief of Royal Malaysian Navy.

== Early life ==
Abdul Rahman was born on 2 December 1964 in Johor Bahru, Johor.

== Navy career ==
Abdul Rahman Ayob joined the Royal Malaysian Navy as an Officer Cadet on 2 July 1982, and was commissioned as a Sub Lieutenant on 13 June 1984.

Among the positions he had held throughout his service include Commander of the Submarine Force, Deputy Chief of Mission for the Mindanao International Observation Team, Commander of Naval Areas 2, and Commander of Eastern Fleet before being appointed as Deputy Chief of Navy in 2019.

Abdul Rahman was appointed as Chief of the Navy on 27 January 2023, following the retirement of his predecessor Mohd Reza Mohd Sany. He also the first Submariner appointed as Chief of Navy.

== Honours ==
=== Honours of Malaysia ===
- Malaysia :
  - Commander of the Order of Loyalty to the Crown of Malaysia (PSM) – Tan Sri (2023)
  - Commander of the Order of Meritorious Service (PJN) – Datuk (2022)
  - Companion of the Order of Loyalty to the Crown of Malaysia (JSM) (2015)
  - Officer of the Order of the Defender of the Realm (KMN) (2009)
  - Recipient of the Loyal Service Medal (PPS)
  - Recipient of the General Service Medal (PPA)
  - Recipient of the 9th Yang di-Pertuan Agong Installation Medal
  - Recipient of the 13th Yang di-Pertuan Agong Installation Medal
  - Recipient of the 17th Yang di-Pertuan Agong Installation Medal
- Malaysian Armed Forces :
  - Courageous Commander of the Most Gallant Order of Military Service (PGAT) (2023)
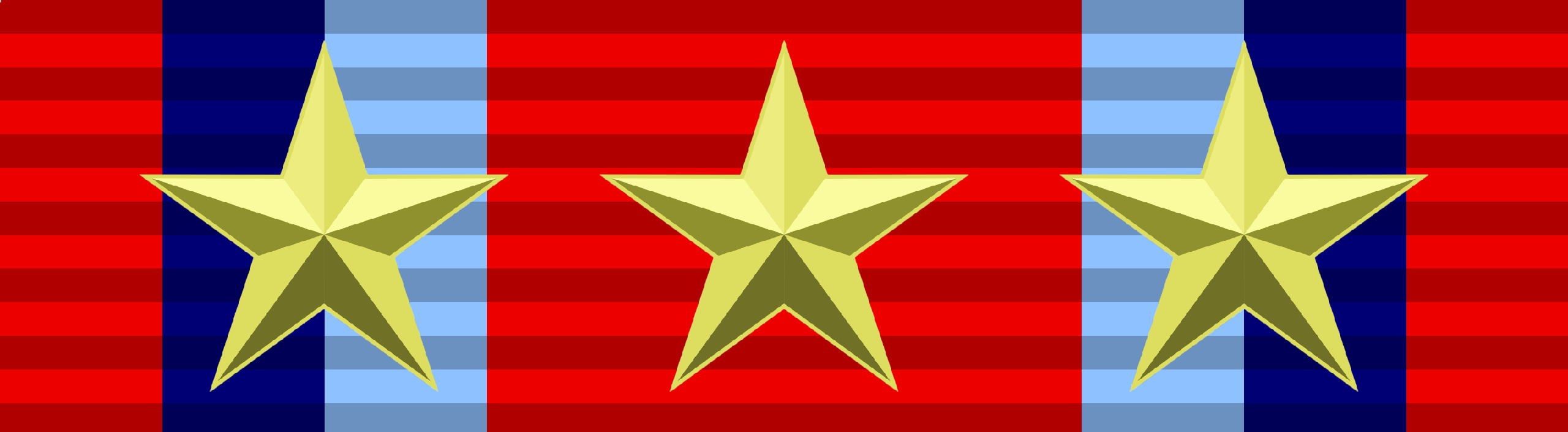
  - Loyal Commander of the Most Gallant Order of Military Service (PSAT) (2015)
  - Warrior of the Most Gallant Order of Military Service (PAT)
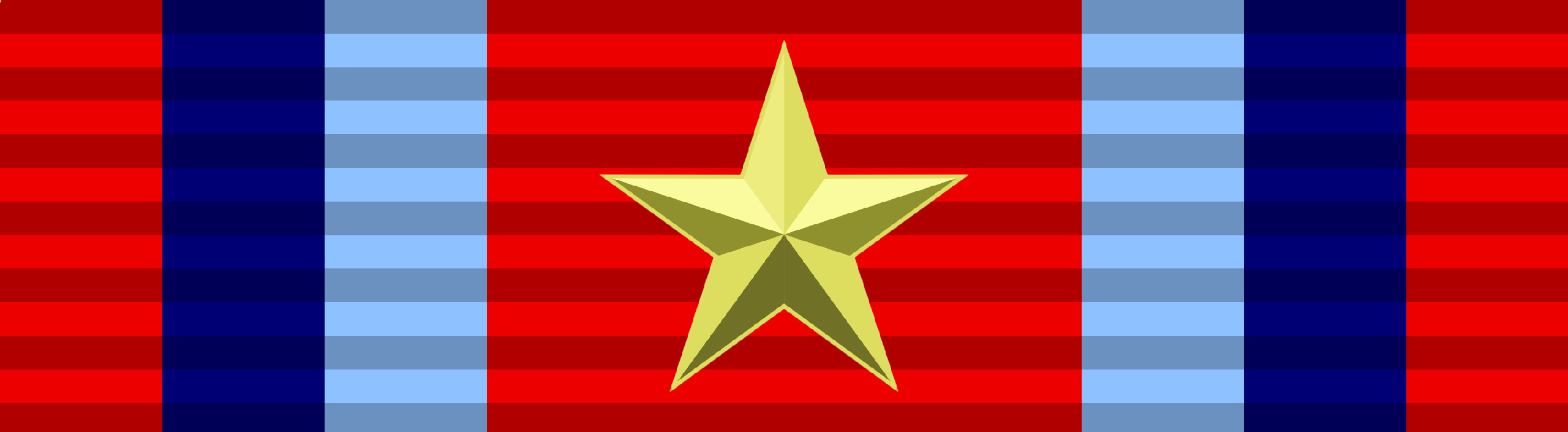
  - Officer of the Most Gallant Order of Military Service (KAT)
  - Malaysian Service Medal (PJM)
- Malacca :
  - Companion Class II of the Exalted Order of Malacca (DPSM) – Datuk (2015)
- Sabah :
  - Commander of the Order of Kinabalu (PGDK) – Datuk (2019)
- Selangor :
  - Knight Commander of the Order of the Crown of Selangor (DPMS) – Dato' (2019)

=== Foreign honours ===
- France :
  - Chevalier of the Legion of Honour (2024)
  - Chevalier of the Ordre national du Mérite
- Pakistan :
  - Nishan-e-Imtiaz (Military) (2024)
