= Mohd Anwar Mohd Nor =

20th and 21st-century Malaysian admiral

Yang Berbahagia Admiral (Rtd) Tan Sri Dato' Sri Mohd Anwar Mohd Nor PGAT PMN PSD SJMK SSAP SSIS SPTS DHMS DCSM PSAT DPMS DPTS PAT JSM JSD PMP KAT KMN BKT PPS PPA
- محمد أنوار محمد نور

15th Chief of Defence Forces
- In office 29 April 2005 – 31 January 2007
- Monarchs: Sirajuddin; Mizan Zainal Abidin
- Prime Minister: Abdullah Ahmad Badawi
- Minister of Defence: Najib Razak
- Preceded by: Mohd Zahidi Zainuddin
- Succeeded by: Abdul Aziz Zainal

12th Chief of Navy
- In office 13 August 2003 – 27 April 2005
- Preceded by: Mohd Ramly Abu Bakar
- Succeeded by: Ilyas Din

Personal details
- Born: 3 December 1951 (age 74) Alor Gajah, Malacca, Federation of Malaya (now Malaysia)
- Education: HM Naval Base Secondary School, Singapore; Naval Staff College, Rhode Island, US
- Occupation: Retired senior military officer; politician; businessman

Military service
- Allegiance: Malaysia; Yang di-Pertuan Agong
- Branch/service: Royal Malaysian Navy
- Years of service: 1969–2007
- Rank: Admiral (Malay: Laksamana)
- Commands: Chief of Defence Forces; Chief of Royal Malaysian Navy
- Awards: Courageous Commander of the Order of Military Service (PGAT)

Mohd Anwar bin Mohd Nor (born 3 December 1951) is the 15th and the former Chief of Defence Forces (Malay: Panglima Angkatan Tentera — PAT). He is the first head of the Malaysian Armed Forces (MAF) to be appointed from the Royal Malaysian Navy (RMN). For over five decades previously, the Chief of the Defence Force had traditionally been a 4-star General from the Malaysian Army. Anwar broke the tradition by being appointed the first Navy Admiral to be promoted to Chief of Defence Force.

== After retirement ==
After retirement, Anwar was involved in politics and appointed a Senator of Dewan Negara for one term from 23 April 2015 to 22 April 2018, representing United Malays National Organisation (UMNO), a component of Barisan Nasional (BN) coalition. He also served as the chairman of the Armed Forces Fund Board or Lembaga Tabung Angkatan Tentera (LTAT).

== Honours ==
=== Honours of Malaysia ===
- Malaysia
  - Commander of the Order of the Defender of the Realm (PMN) – Tan Sri (2005)
  - Commander of the Order of Loyalty to the Royal Family of Malaysia (PSD) – Datuk (2002)
  - Companion of the Order of Loyalty to the Crown of Malaysia (JSM) (1997)
  - Companion of the Order of Loyalty to the Royal Family of Malaysia (JSD) (1993)
  - Officer of the Order of the Defender of the Realm (KMN) (1991)
  - Recipient of the Loyal Service Medal (PPS)
  - Recipient of the General Service Medal (PPA)
  - Recipient of the 9th Yang di-Pertuan Agong Installation Medal
  - Recipient of the 10th Yang di-Pertuan Agong Installation Medal
  - Recipient of the 12th Yang di-Pertuan Agong Installation Medal
- Kedah
  - Knight Commander of the Order of Loyalty to Sultan Abdul Halim Mu'adzam Shah (DHMS) – Dato' Paduka (2007)
- Kelantan
  - Knight Grand Commander of the Order of the Life of the Crown of Kelantan (SJMK) – Dato' (2007)
- Malacca
  - Knight Commander of the Exalted Order of Malacca (DCSM) – Datuk Wira (2006)
  - Recipient of the Commendable Service Star (BKT) (1991)
- Pahang
  - Knight Grand Companion of the Order of Sultan Ahmad Shah of Pahang (SSAP) – Dato' Sri (2003)
- Perak
  - Knight Grand Commander of the Order of Taming Sari (SPTS) – Dato' Seri Panglima (2004)
  - Knight Commander of the Order of Taming Sari (DPTS) – Dato' Pahlawan (1997)
  - Commander of the Order of the Perak State Crown (PMP) (1994)
- Selangor
  - Knight Grand Companion of the Order of Sultan Sharafuddin Idris Shah (SSIS) – Dato' Setia (2004)
  - Knight Commander of the Order of the Crown of Selangor (DPMS) – Dato' (2003)
  - Recipient of the Sultan Sharafuddin Coronation Medal (2003)

=== Foreign honours ===
- Brunei
  - First Class of the Order of Paduka Keberanian Laila Terbilang (DPKT) - Dato Paduka Seri
- France
  - Officer of the Legion of Honour (2007)
- Indonesia
  - First Class (Utama) of the Star of Yudha Dharma (2006)
- Italy
  - Grand Officer of the Order of Merit of the Italian Republic (2004)
- Thailand
  - Knight Grand Cross of the Order of the Crown of Thailand (PM) (2000)
