= Aini Ideris =

Malaysian academic and veterinarian

Yang Berbahagia Datin Paduka Setia Aini Ideris SSIS DPMK DSIS PSK KMN FASc FIAS FMCVS FMSA

Vice-Chancellor of the Universiti Putra Malaysia
- In office 1 January 2016 – 30 June 2020
- Chancellor: Sharafuddin of Selangor
- Preceded by: Mohd Fauzi Ramlan
- Succeeded by: Roslan Sulaiman

Deputy Vice-Chancellor (Academic and International) of Universiti Putra Malaysia
- In office 1 December 2008 – 30 November 2013
- Chancellor: Sharafuddin of Selangor
- Preceded by: Khatijah Yusuf
- Succeeded by: Mad Nasir Shamsudin

Director of Corporate Strategy & Communications Office (CoSComm) of Universiti Putra Malaysia
- In office 1 October 2015 – 31 December 2015
- Chancellor: Sharafuddin of Selangor

Personal details
- Born: 23 March 1953 (age 73) Kota Bharu, Kelantan
- Citizenship: Malaysia
- Education: Universiti Putra Malaysia (DVM); University of Liverpool (MVSc); Universiti Putra Malaysia (PhD)

Aini binti Ideris is a Malaysian academic and veterinarian. She served as the 8th Vice-Chancellor of UPM from 1 January 2016 until 31 August 2020. Her research interests include disease control and productions of vaccines for poultry.

== Awards ==
In 2011, Professor Dr. Aini received the National Academic Award (AAN) 2010 for the Innovation and Product Commercialisation Award Category, for the innovation and commercialisation of the Newcastle disease (ND V4-UPM) vaccines.

== Honours ==
=== Honours of Malaysia ===
- Malaysia
  - Officer of the Order of the Defender of the Realm (KMN) (1995)
- Kelantan
  - Knight Commander of the Order of the Crown of Kelantan (DPMK) – Dato' (2017)
  - Commander of the Order of the Loyalty to the Crown of Kelantan (PSK)
- Selangor
  - Knight Grand Companion of the Order of Sultan Sharafuddin Idris Shah (SSIS) – Datin Paduka Setia (11 December 2019)
  - Knight Companion of the Order of Sultan Sharafuddin Idris Shah (DSIS) – Datin Paduka (2008)

Academic offices
Preceded by Mohd Fauzi Haji Ramlan	Vice-Chancellor of the Universiti Putra Malaysia; 2016 – 2020	Succeeded by Roslan Sulaiman
Preceded by Khatijah Yusuf	Deputy Vice-Chancellor (Academic and International) of the Universiti Putra Malaysia; 2008 – 2013	Succeeded by Mad Nasir Shamsudin
