= Abdul Aziz Jaafar =

Malaysian naval officer (born 1956)

Yang Berbahagia Admiral (Rtd) Tan Sri Dato' Sri Abdul Aziz Jaafar PGAT PSM PJN SPMS SPKK SSAP DGPN SPDK SPTS DCSM PSAT SMW DPMS DMSM PAT JSM KAT KMN AMN BCM PPS PPA PJM PM
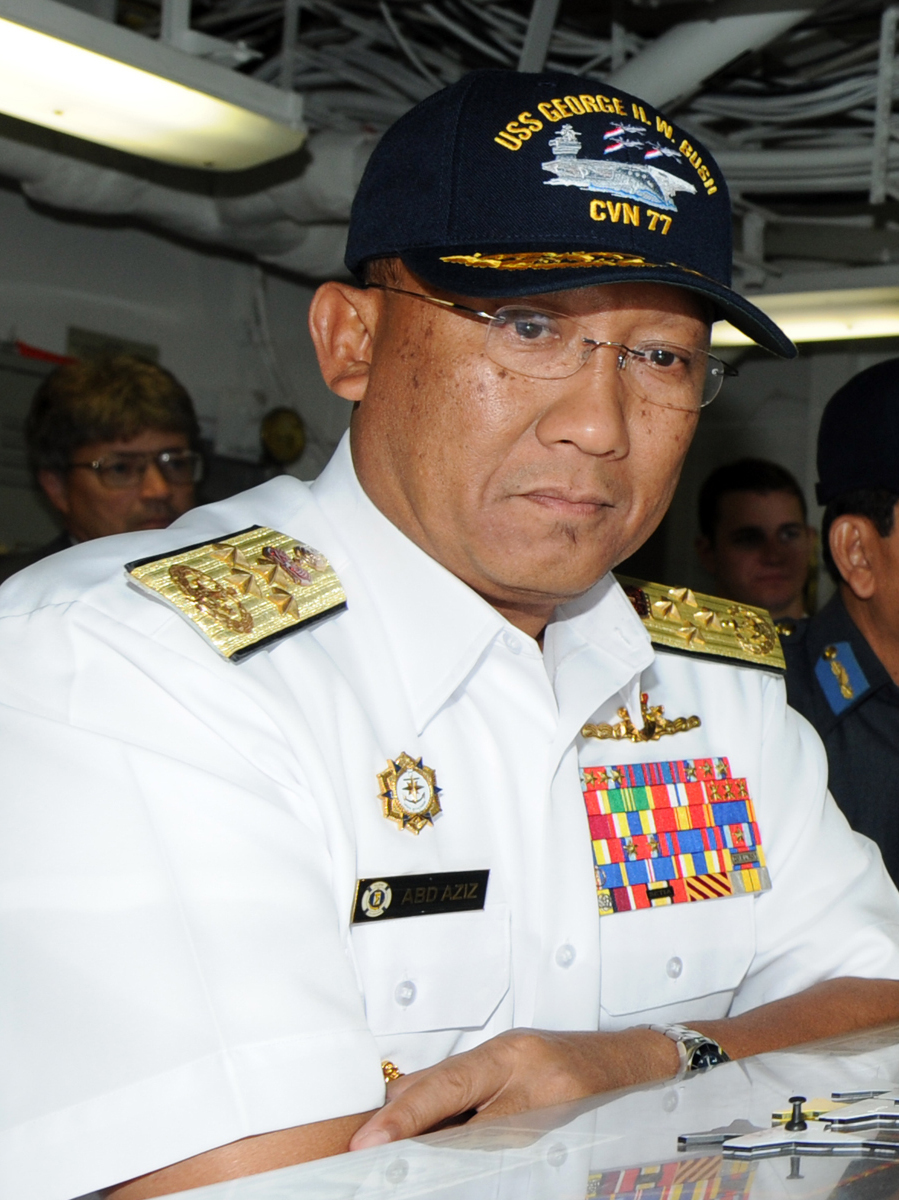
- Abdul Aziz in 2010

15th Chief of Navy
- In office 1 April 2008 – 18 November 2015
- Preceded by: Ramlan Mohamed Ali
- Succeeded by: Ahmad Kamarulzaman Ahmad Badaruddin

Personal details
- Born: Abdul Aziz bin Haji Jaafar; 7 May 1956 (age 70) Sungai Udang, Malacca, Federation of Malaya (now Malaysia)

Military service
- Allegiance: Malaysia
- Branch/service: Royal Malaysian Navy
- Years of service: 1977–2015
- Rank: Admiral
- Battles/wars: Second Malayan Emergency

Abdul Aziz bin Haji Jaafar (born 7 May 1956 in Sungai Udang, Malacca) is a retired Malaysian admiral who served as the 15th Chief of Royal Malaysian Navy on 1 April 2008.

== Life ==
Abdul Aziz Jaafar was born in Sungai Udang, Malacca on 7 May 1956, joined the Royal Malaysian Navy in December 1974, and was subsequently commissioned as a Second Lieutenant in 1977.

He was selected as a commissioning crew member four times, namely during the commissioning of KD Paus (1976), KD Sri Indera Sakti (1982), KD Kasturi (1984), and KD Laksamana Muhammad Amin (1999). He has also been appointed as a commanding officer three times, namely KD Baung, KD Jupiter, and finally the corvette KD Muhammad Amin. While at KD Muhammad Amin, he also acted as Senior Officer Afloat or Senior Fleet Officer.

His first position as First Admiral was to be Commander of Marine Region II, which was then based in Labuan in July 2002. Three years later, he was appointed Assistant Chief of Staff for Human Resources at the Naval Headquarters. Six months later, in January 2006, he was appointed as Fleet Commander. In July, he returned to the Naval Headquarters as Assistant Chief of Staff for Defense Training Operations until he was appointed as Deputy Commander of the Navy on 15 November 2006.

In 2014, Jaafar conducted a joint exercise with Singapore Navy.

== Honours ==
- Malaysia
  - Commander of the Order of Loyalty to the Crown of Malaysia (PSM) – Tan Sri (2009)
  - Commander of the Order of Meritorious Service (PJN) – Datuk (2007)
  - Companion of the Order of Loyalty to the Crown of Malaysia (JSM) (2004)
  - Officer of the Order of the Defender of the Realm (KMN) (1998)
  - Member of the Order of the Defender of the Realm (AMN) (1991)
  - Recipient of the Loyal Service Medal (PPS)
  - Recipient of the General Service Medal (PPA)
  - Recipient of the 9th Yang di-Pertuan Agong Installation Medal (1989)
  - Recipient of the 11th Yang di-Pertuan Agong Installation Medal (1999)
  - Recipient of the 13th Yang di-Pertuan Agong Installation Medal (2007)
  - Recipient of the 14th Yang di-Pertuan Agong Installation Medal (2012)
- Malaysian Armed Forces
  - Courageous Commander of the Most Gallant Order of Military Service (PGAT)
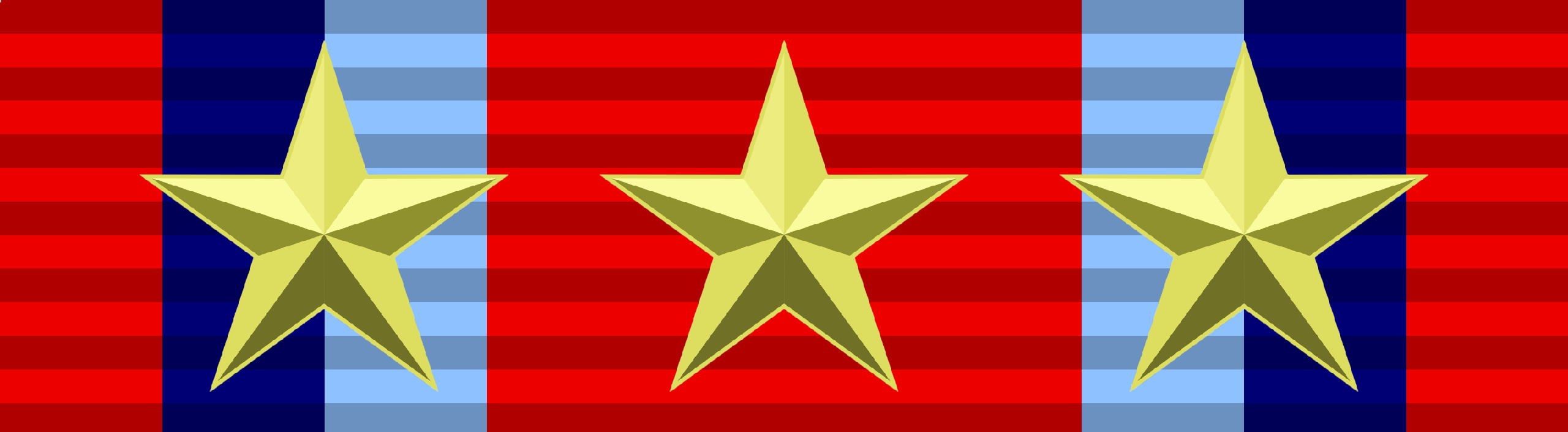
  - Loyal Commander of the Most Gallant Order of Military Service (PSAT)
  - Warrior of the Most Gallant Order of Military Service (PAT)
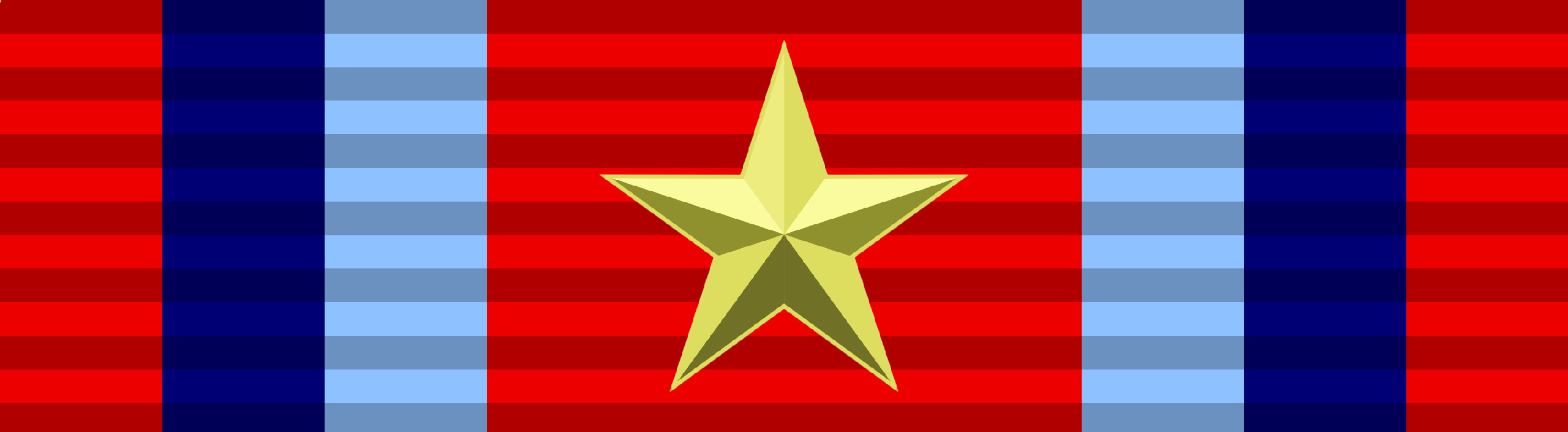
  - Officer of the Most Gallant Order of Military Service (KAT)
  - Recipient of the Malaysian Service Medal (PJM)
- Federal Territory (Malaysia)
  - Grand Commander of the Order of the Territorial Crown (SMW) – Datuk Seri (2009)
- Kelantan
  - Knight Grand Commander of the Order of the Noble Crown of Kelantan (SPKK) – Dato' (2009)
- Malacca
  - Knight Commander of the Exalted Order of Malacca (DCSM) – Datuk Wira (2008)
  - Companion Class I of the Exalted Order of Malacca (DMSM) – Datuk (2002)
- Pahang
  - Knight Grand Companion of the Order of Sultan Ahmad Shah of Pahang (SSAP) – Dato' Sri (2008)
- Penang
  - Commander of the Order of the Defender of State (DGPN) – Dato' Seri (2013)
- Perak
  - Knight Grand Commander of the Order of Taming Sari (SPTS) – Dato' Seri Panglima (2009)
- Sabah
  - Grand Commander of the Order of Kinabalu (SPDK) – Datuk Seri Panglima (2008)
- Selangor
  - Knight Grand Commander of the Order of the Crown of Selangor (SPMS) – Dato' Seri (2011)
  - Knight Commander of the Order of the Crown of Selangor (DPMS) – Dato' (2007)

=== Foreign Honours ===
- Indonesia
  - First Class (Utama) of the Star of Jalasena (2010)
- Thailand
  - Knight Grand Cross of the Order of the Crown of Thailand (PM) (2009)
