= Ong Hock Thye =

Ong Hock Thye (1908–1977), PMN, PSM, DPMS, also known as H. T. Ong, was Chief Judge of Malaya (known as Chief Justice of Malaya prior to 1994) (8 Nov 1968 – 31 Aug 1973) and a Barrister-at-Law of Middle Temple. He was the son of Mr. Ong Teng Up and was born in Penang in 1908. In 1935, he married Chong Khew Yin (1915–1942). In 1943, he married Mary Chung Yuet See (1924–1995), the eldest daughter of Kapitan China Chung Thye Phin.

He was educated at the King Edward VII School and St. George's Institution in Taiping and the University of London. He was the first ethnic Chinese to be appointed a Supreme Court Judge in Malaysia. He was an advocate and solicitor and practiced in Perak from 1931 till his appointment to the Supreme Court on 1 September 1958. He was Chairman of the Royal Commission on Non-Muslim Marriage and Divorce Laws having been appointed on 4 February 1970 by the Duli Yang Maha Mulia Yang di-Pertuan Agong. The other members of his commission comprised Ms P. G. Lim, Enche M. Shankar, Mrs Rosalind Y. C. Foo and DatinJamaki Athi Nahappan. He authored "Law and Justice Through the Cases" which was published in 1973. He was a former chairman of the Malayan Association of the Blind, Brickfields. He was Chairman of the National Relief Fund set up following the tragic 13 May incident in 1969.

== Anecdotes ==
=== Right To Be Heard ===
Tan Sri H.T. Ong—when he was Chief Judge of Malaya—once stopped Counsel who had just begun to open an appeal (an indication that he required no argument for the appellant) and called on Counsel for the Respondent. Counsel for the Respondent began belligerently by saying "Do I understand that my Lord has already made up his mind without hearing the case for the Respondent?" "Oh, no!" said H.T. amiably "please say anything you wish Mr X". He then sat back and said not another word. Counsel for the Respondent soon dried up. Counsel for the appellant was not called on to reply. It is only fair to H.T. who had a brilliant mind, quick to grasp a point but who always gave Counsel his say and listened intently, to say that the Privy Council upheld his judgment in the subsequent appeal.

=== Chief Justice of Singapore ===
If not for H. T., Chan Sek Keong, Singapore's Chief Justice, might have taken much longer to enter the legal profession.

== In Memory ==
In 1958, Ong Hock Thye, better and popularly known as H.T. Ong, a member of the Hon. Society of the Middle Temple, made legal history when he and Tan Sri Ismail Khan, a Barrister-At-Law of the Hon. Society of the Middle Temple as well, were the first 2 local private practitioners to be elevated to the Bench of the High Court States of Malaya after Independence. H.T.Ong is known for his well crafted judgments and legal prose. He died in 1977.

== Honours ==
=== Honours of Malaysia ===
- Malaysia
  - Commander of the Order of the Defender of the Realm (PMN) – Tan Sri (1972)
  - Commander of the Order of Loyalty to the Crown of Malaysia (PSM) – Tan Sri (1967)
  - Recipient of the Malaysian Commemorative Medal (Silver) (PPM) (1965)
- Selangor
  - Knight Commander of the Order of the Crown of Selangor (DPMS) – Dato' (1966)

== Notes ==
=== See also ===
- United Nations Review By United Nations Office of Public Information Published by United Nations Dept. of Public Information, 1954
- Official Year Book – Malaysia By Jabatan Penerangan, Malaya Published by Federal Dept. of Information, Ministry of Information, Malaysia., 1962
- The Chinese in Southeast Asia By L A Peter Gosling, Linda Lim, Linda Y C Lim, University of Singapore Economic Research Centre, University of Michigan, University of Michigan Center for South and Southeast Asian Studies, Center for South and Southeast Asian Studies, Economic Research Centre, University of Singapore Published by Maruzen Asia, 1983
- Without Fear or Favour By Chee Khoon Tan, R. K. Vasil Published by Eastern Universities Press (M), 1984 ISBN 967-908-051-X, ISBN 978-967-908-051-3
