= Naval Base Secondary School =

Secondary school in Singapore

Coordinates: 1.4191°N 103.8309°E

- 901 Yishun Ring Road, Singapore 768689

Information
- Former name: Naval Base School (1957-1968)
- Type: Government
- Motto: Enitamur In Altiora (Latin) (Be Our Best)
- Founded: 1957; 69 years ago
- Session: Single session
- School code: 3214
- Principal: Mdm Linda Yeo
- Grades: Secondary 1 to 5
- Age range: 13-17
- Language: English
- Song: "Our School Song"
- Nickname: Navalite
- Vision: Leaders of Character, Learners for Tomorrow
- Website: https://www.navalbasesec.moe.edu.sg

Naval Base Secondary School (NBSS) is a co-educational government secondary school in Yishun, Singapore. Founded in 1957, NBSS initially began as a school for children of employees of the British Navy. Since 2003, NBSS has been organizing overseas trips for their students to decrease delinquency along with getting students more interested in the arts.

== History ==
=== Naval Base School (1957–1968) ===
Naval Base Secondary School was founded in 1957 as Naval Base School (NBS). Naval Base School had initially started with two Secondary classes housed at Yio Chu Kang Primary School.

In 1958, They moved to Bah Tan Road after the British Navy had set aside some land in the British Naval Base for children of the Naval Base employees. Students from Yio Chu Kang Primary School and Admiralty Asian School were also moved to the new Naval Base School.

In 1965, Rudy Mosbergen, the fourth principal of Naval Base School, composed the lyrics and music of Naval Base School's school song.

In 1968, the school was renamed to Naval Base Secondary School when the primary had moved to Canberra School.

=== Naval Base Secondary School (1969–1999) ===
In 1980, NBSS moved to Yishun to meet the needs of the growing residential population.

In 1986, NBSS participated in the Singapore Youth Festival.

In 1990, then-Minister of Education, Tony Tan, officiates the opening of NBSS's new building in Yishun.

In 1999, NBSS established links with the Republic of Singapore's Navy.

=== Progress as Naval Base Secondary School (2000–present) ===
In 2000, NBSS added a new block to its building which was opened by Mr Yahya Aljaru.

In 2003, NBSS began organizing overseas study trips to encourage students and motivate their interest in the arts.

In 2004, the NBSS Art Department set up an art exhibition at the Asian Civilisations Museum.

In 2008, NBSS underwent PRIME and was temporarily housed at Sembawang from 2008 to 2009. NBSS went back to its Yishun campus the following year and was officially opened by Mr Heng Swee Keat.

In 2010, NBSS was recognized as a niche school in Visual Arts and the Art Department began work on a community wall, inspired by Antoni Gaudi, finished in 2014.

== Identity and culture ==
=== School crest ===
The lion represents Singapore and taking pride in their national identity. The open book represents the importance of education and knowledge. The four yellow lines represent the four ethnic groups in Singapore, Chinese, Malay, Indian, Others, and working together in harmony. The blue background represents their commitment to integrating new citizens into Singapore's socio-cultural diversity. The three rings are inspired by the Olympics.

== Notable alumni ==
- Quah Kim Song, Singaporean footballer
- Subhas Anandan, Singaporean criminal lawyer
- Carl Tong, Hong Kong businessman
- Mohd Anwar Mohd Nor, Malaysian admiral

== See also ==
- Secondary schools in Singapore
