= Husaini Omar =

Malaysian academic

Yang Berbahagia Dato' Husaini Omar DPMK DPMS PSK
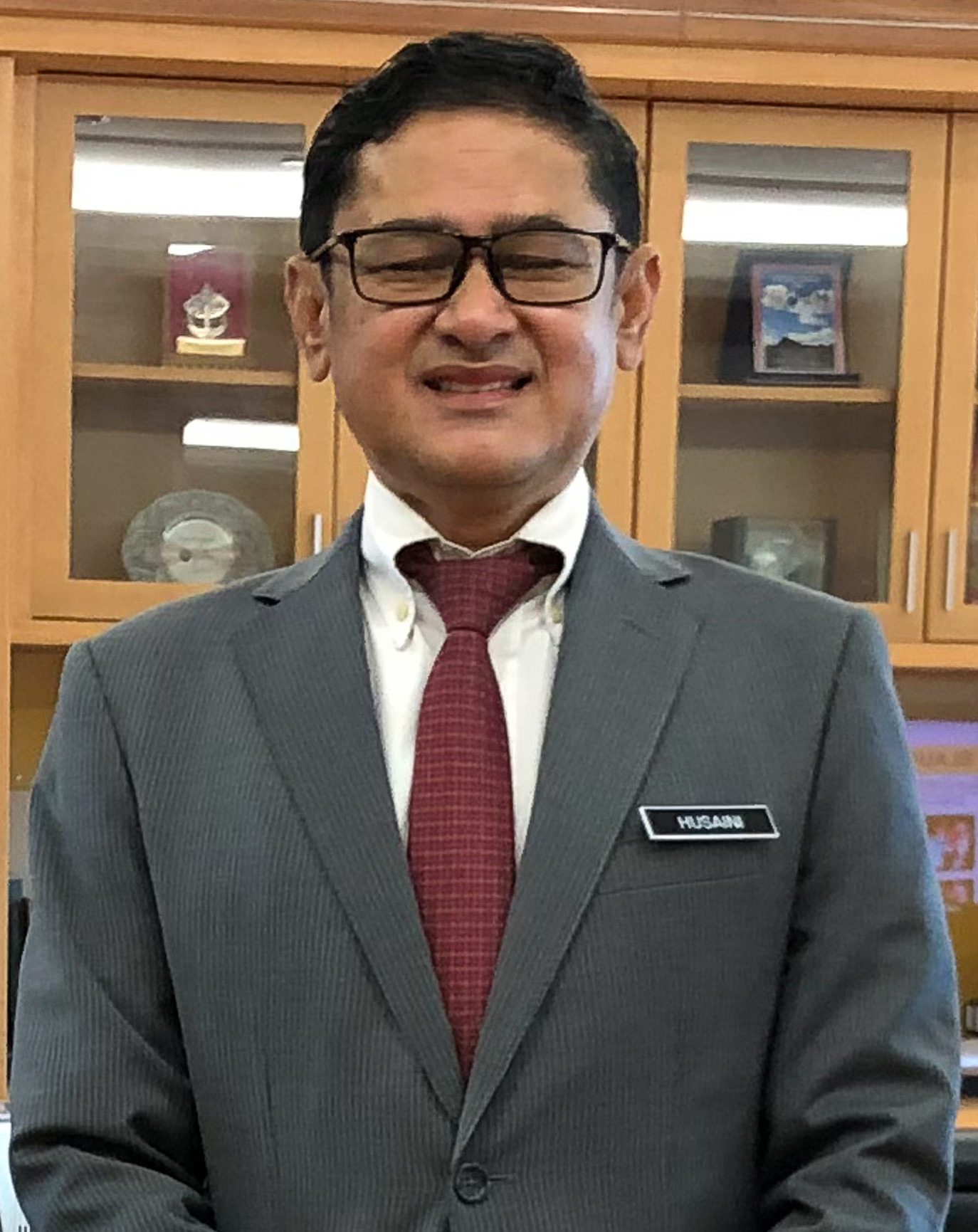

8th Director-General of Higher Education
- In office 1 February 2021 – 9 March 2023
- Monarch: Abdullah
- Prime Minister: Muhyiddin Yassin (2021); Ismail Sabri Yaakob (2021–2022); Anwar Ibrahim (2022–2023)
- Minister: Noraini Ahmad (2021–2022); Mohamed Khaled Nordin (2022–2023)
- Preceded by: Mohamed Mustafa Ishak
- Succeeded by: Azlinda Azman

4th Vice-Chancellor of the Universiti Malaysia Kelantan
- In office 1 January 2018 – 6 January 2019
- Chancellor: Tengku Muhammad Fa-iz Petra
- Preceded by: Mortaza Mohamed
- Succeeded by: Noor Azizi Ismail

Deputy Vice-Chancellor (Research and Innovation) of Universiti Putra Malaysia
- In office 15 February 2017 – 1 January 2018
- Chancellor: Sharafuddin
- Preceded by: Mohd. Azmi Mohd Lila
- Succeeded by: Zulkifli Idrus

Personal details
- Born: 10 March 1963 (age 63) Kelantan, Federation of Malaya (now Malaysia)
- Citizenship: Malaysian
- Spouse: Norwati Mustapha
- Education: University of Malaya (BSc); University of Leeds (MEng); Universiti Putra Malaysia (PhD)

Husaini bin Omar (born 10 March 1963) is a Malaysian academic, geologist, researcher, engineer and former Director-General of Higher Education from 1 February 2021 until 9 March 2023.

== Education ==
Husaini obtained a Bachelor of Science with Honors (Geology) from the University of Malaya in 1988 and a Master of Geological Engineering from the University of Leeds, United Kingdom in 1994. He subsequently obtained a Doctor of Engineering (System Engineering) from Universiti Putra Malaysia in 2002.

== Career ==
Husaini had eight years of industry experience as a geological engineer before starting his career as a lecturer at the Faculty of Engineering Universiti Putra Malaysia in 1996. He enjoyed academic and administrative success until he was appointed Deputy Vice Chancellor (Research and Innovation) of UPM on 15 February 2017 before assuming the position of Vice Chancellor of Universiti Malaysia Kelantan on 1 January 2018 until 6 January 2019. He subsequently assumed the duties of chief executive officer of the Malaysian Qualifications Agency (MQA) from 1 June 2020 until 31 January 2021.

== Honours ==
- Kelantan
  - Knight Commander of the Order of the Crown of Kelantan (DPMK) – Dato' (2018)
  - Commander of the Order of Loyalty to the Crown of Kelantan (PSK) (2012)
- Selangor
  - Knight Commander of the Order of the Crown of Selangor (DPMS) – Dato' (2016)
