= Carl Tong =

Hong Kong businessman

Carl Tong Ka-wing (Chinese: 唐家榮; 1950–2024) is a Hong Kong businessman. He is the co-chairman of the Macau Legend Development and is a former unofficial member of the Legislative Council of Hong Kong from 1984 to 1985.

== Biography ==
Tong studied at the Naval Base Secondary School and the Raffles Institution, Singapore. He worked in the accounting field after his education and worked with Arthur Andersen in 1977 and as vice-president of Citibank, N.A. between 1985 and 1987. Tong became the founder and had been the chairman of the Carl Tong & Associates Management Consultancy Ltd. in 1987, which is engaged in management consultancy business, and the Goodrich Global Pte Ltd. and its subsidiaries in Singapore, China, Hong Kong, India, Indonesia, Malaysia and the United Arab Emirates since 1983. Tong has also been the secretary, chief financial officer and chief executive officer of the Creative Master Bermuda, where he set strategic directions and plans for the growth and expansion of Creative Master Bermuda. He was a director of Asia Television Ltd. between 1990 and 1991.

Tong is currently the co-chairman of the Macau Legend Development Ltd., a managing director of the Carl Tong & Associates Management Consultancy Ltd., and chief executive officer and director at UNIR (HK) Management Ltd. He was also previously employed as executive director of the Crocodile Garments Ltd., deputy chairman of the eSun Holdings Ltd., and chief executive officer & executive director of the Creative Master Bermuda Ltd. and served on the board of the Behringer Corp. Ltd.

Tong has been involved in the public services in Hong Kong and Singapore. He served as a member for the Central and Western District Board of Hong Kong between 1982 and 1988. From 1984 to 1985, Tong was appointed unofficial member of the Legislative Council of Hong Kong. He had been on the member of the advisory committee and the council member of Singapore Kindness Movement in 2009, Naval Base Secondary School, Singapore Children Society and the Singapore Association of Small and Medium Enterprise where he serves as its vice-president. Tong is a member of the Hong Kong Institute of Certified Public Accountants in 1981, an associate of the Institute of Chartered Accountants in England & Wales in 1980 and a member of the Institute of the Motor Industry in 1973.

Tong's younger brother, Carlson Tong Ka-shing, is the former chairman of the Securities and Futures Commission. His son, Clinton Tong Tsun-tak, was ordered to perform 150 hours of community service for drink-driving and driving his father's car without a license in 2010 when he was 18.
