= Mohd Reza Mohd Sany =

17th Chief of Royal Malaysian Navy (2018–2023)

Yang Berbahagia Admiral (Rtd) Tan Sri Mohd Reza Mohd Sany PGAT PSM PSD DPPN PSAT DPMS DPTS DSDK PMW PAT KAT KMN PPS PPA PJM PM NI(M)
- Mohd Reza in 2022

17th Chief of Navy
- In office 30 November 2018 – 26 January 2023
- Monarchs: Muhammad V (2018–2019); Abdullah (2019–2023)
- Prime Minister: Mahathir Mohamad (2018–2020); Muhyiddin Yassin (2020–2021); Ismail Sabri Yaakob (2021–2022); Anwar Ibrahim (2022–2023)
- Minister of Defence: Mohamad Sabu (2018–2020); Ismail Sabri Yaakob (2020–2021); Hishammuddin Hussein (2021–2022); Mohamad Hassan (2022–2023)
- Preceded by: Ahmad Kamarulzaman Ahmad Badaruddin
- Succeeded by: Abdul Rahman Ayob

Personal details
- Born: 13 August 1963 (age 63) Kuala Lumpur, Selangor, Federation of Malaya
- Spouse: Maslina Ismail
- Children: 5
- Parent: Mohd Sany Abdul Ghaffar (father)

Military service
- Allegiance: Malaysia
- Branch/service: Royal Malaysian Navy
- Years of service: 1981–2023
- Rank: Admiral
- Battles/wars: Second Malayan Emergency

Mohd Reza bin Mohd Sany (born 13 August 1963 in Kuala Lumpur) is a Malaysian retired admiral who served as 17th Chief of Royal Malaysian Navy.

Mohd Reza was retired on 26 January 2023 after 42 years of service in Navy.

== Honours ==
=== Honours of Malaysia ===
- Malaysia
  - Commander of the Order of Loyalty to the Crown of Malaysia (PSM) – Tan Sri (2019)
  - Commander of the Order of Loyalty to the Royal Family of Malaysia (PSD) – Datuk (2014)
  - Officer of the Order of the Defender of the Realm (KMN) (2007)
  - Recipient of the Loyal Service Medal (PPS)
  - Recipient of the General Service Medal (PPA)
  - Recipient of the 14th Yang di-Pertuan Agong Installation Medal
- Malaysian Armed Forces
  - Courageous Commander of The Most Gallant Order of Military Service (PGAT) (2021)
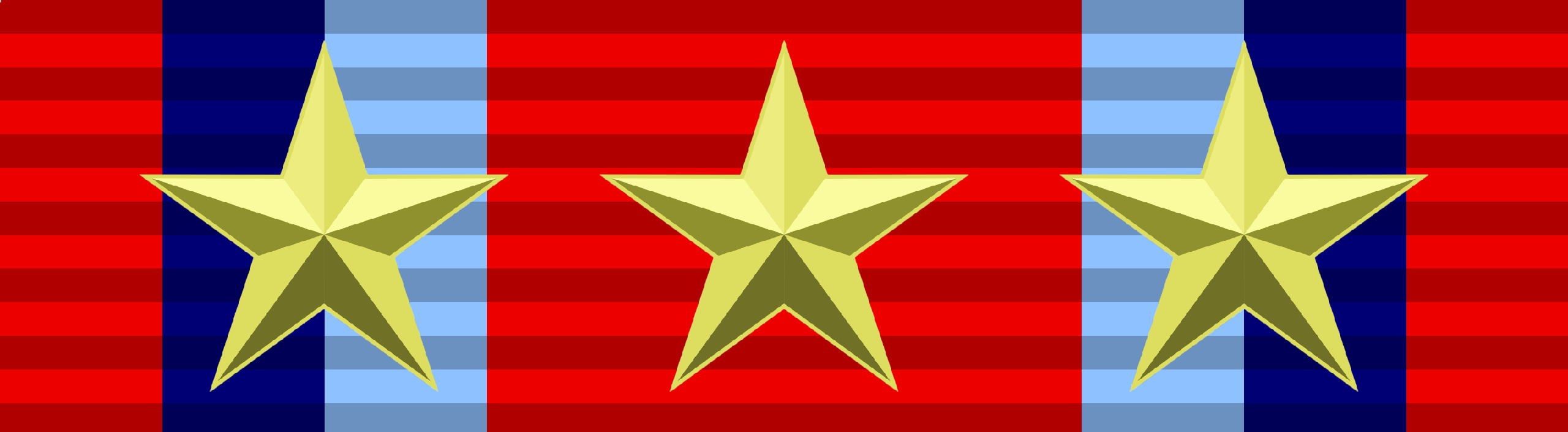
  - Loyal Commander of the Most Gallant Order of Military Service (PSAT)
  - Warrior of the Most Gallant Order of Military Service (PAT)
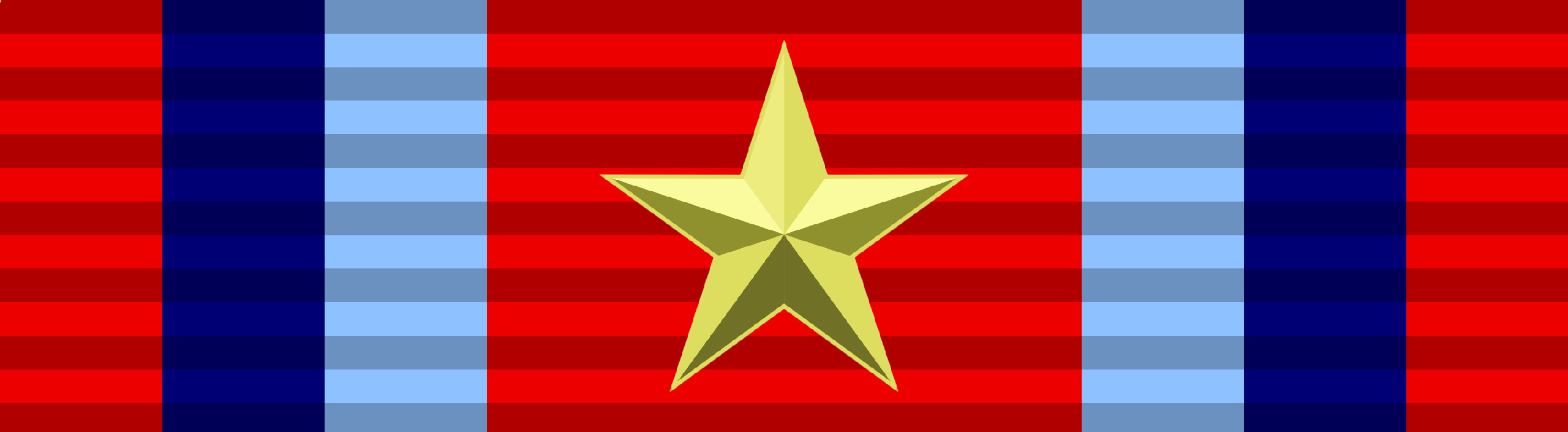
  - Officer of the Most Gallant Order of Military Service (KAT)
  - Recipient of the Malaysian Service Medal (PJM)
- Federal Territory (Malaysia)
  - Commander of the Order of the Territorial Crown (PMW) – Datuk (2016)
- Kedah
  - Knight Companion of the Order of Loyalty to the Royal House of Kedah (DSDK) – Dato' (2014)
- Penang
  - Knight Commander of the Order of the Defender of State (DPPN) – Dato' Seri (2020)
- Perak
  - Knight Commander of the Order of Taming Sari (DPTS) – Dato' Pahlawan (2011)
- Selangor
  - Knight Commander of the Order of the Crown of Selangor (DPMS) – Dato' (2018)

=== Foreign honours ===
- France
  - Officer of the Legion of Honour (2021)
- Pakistan
  - Recipient of the Nishan-e-Imtiaz (NI) (2022)
- Thailand
  - Knight Grand Cross of the Order of the Crown of Thailand (PM) (2025)
