= Roslan Sulaiman =

Malaysian academic

Yang Berbahagia Dato' Mohd Roslan Sulaiman DPMS DSAP

Vice-Chancellor of the Universiti Putra Malaysia
- In office 1 September 2020 – 31 August 2023
- Chancellor: Sharafuddin of Selangor
- Preceded by: Aini Ideris
- Succeeded by: Ahmad Farhan Mohd Sadullah

Deputy Vice-Chancellor (Students' Affairs and Alumni) of Universiti Putra Malaysia
- In office 1 September 2017 – 31 August 2020
- Chancellor: Sharafuddin of Selangor
- Preceded by: Mohammad Shatar Sabran
- Succeeded by: Arifin Abdu

Personal details
- Born: 4 September 1969 (age 57) Kuala Rompin, Pahang
- Education: Universiti Pertanian Malaysia (DVM); University of Edinburgh (PhD)

Mohd Roslan bin Sulaiman (born 4 September 1969) is a Malaysian academic administrator. He was the Vice-Chancellor of Universiti Putra Malaysia from 1 September 2020 until 31 August 2023. He obtained his degree in Veterinary Medicine from Universiti Pertanian Malaysia in 1994 and doctoral degree in Nervous System Physiology from University of Edinburgh in 1999. As of 2020, he has published more than 200 research results in high-impact journals.

== Furloughed from position ==
Less than six months after he was appointed as Vice-Chancellor of UPM, the Ministry of Higher Education furloughed him from the position without giving any reason. The furlough period was from 18 February 2021 until 17 March 2021, but has since been extended indefinitely. The ministry also instructed the UPM's Deputy Vice-Chancellor (Research and Innovation) in lieu of Vice-Chancellor's position. Four months after he had been furloughed, he resumed his position as Vice-Chancellor of UPM from 21 June 2021.

== Honour ==
=== Honour of Malaysia ===
- Pahang
  - Knight Companion of the Order of Sultan Ahmad Shah of Pahang (DSAP) – Dato' (2022)
- Selangor
  - Knight Commander of the Order of the Crown of Selangor (DPMS) – Dato' (2022)

Academic offices
Preceded by Aini Ideris	Vice-Chancellor of the Universiti Putra Malaysia; 2020 – present	Succeeded by Ahmad Farhan Mohd Sadullah
Preceded by Mohammad Shatar Sabran	Deputy Vice-Chancellor (Students' Affairs and Alumni) of the Universiti Putra Malaysia; 2017 – 2020	Succeeded by Arifin Abdu
