= Ahmad Farhan Mohd Sadullah =

Malaysian academic

Yang Berbahagia Dato' Ahmad Farhan Mohd Sadullah DPMS DPSJ

Vice-Chancellor of the Universiti Putra Malaysia
- Incumbent
- Assumed office 2 October 2023
- Chancellor: Sharafuddin of Selangor
- Preceded by: Roslan Sulaiman

Deputy Vice-Chancellor (Academic and International) of Universiti Sains Malaysia
- In office 15 March 2017 – 4 April 2021
- Chancellor: Sirajuddin of Perlis
- Preceded by: Ahmad Shukri Mustapa Kamal
- Succeeded by: Narimah Samat

Personal details
- Born: 1965-1966 Petaling Jaya, Selangor
- Spouse: Azlina Kamaruddin
- Education: Catholic University of America (BEng); Imperial College of Science, Technology and Medicine (MSc); University College London (PhD)

Ahmad Farhan bin Mohd Sadullah is a Malaysian academic administrator. He is the Vice-Chancellor of Universiti Putra Malaysia since 2 October 2023, succeed the position which has been vacated a month.

== Education background ==
Ahmad Farhan studied in SK Sri Petaling and SMS Selangor for primary and secondary education. He obtained his degree in Civil Engineering from Catholic University of America in 1988, Master of Science in Transport from Imperial College of Science, Technology and Medicine in 1990, and doctoral degree in Transportation Studies from University College London in 1995.

== Career ==
Starting from May 1995, Ahmad Farhan began his career as a lecturer in Universiti Sains Malaysia. At the same time, he also held other post, which are the coordinator of Innovation and Technology Development Unit, the dean of Engineering and Technological Research Platform, and the director of Innovations, USM Research and Innovation Department between 2000 and 2007.

Apart from academic field, Ahmad Farhan also involved himself into government agencies. He is one of the founding members of Land Public Transport Commission (SPAD), and became the interim chairman from 2017 until the agency dissolved. From 2008 to 2011, he has been selected as the director-general of Malaysian Institute of Road Safety Research (MIROS).

== Honours ==
=== Honours of Malaysia ===
- Perlis :
  - Knight Commander of the Order of Prince Syed Sirajuddin Jamalullail of Perlis (DPSJ) – Dato'
- Selangor
  - Knight Commander of the Order of the Crown of Selangor (DPMS) – Dato' (2025)

Academic offices
Preceded by Roslan Sulaiman	Vice-Chancellor of the Universiti Putra Malaysia; 2023 – present	Incumbent
Preceded by Ahmad Shukri Mustapa Kamal	Deputy Vice-Chancellor (Academic and International) of the Universiti Sains Malaysia; 2017 – 2021	Succeeded by Narimah Samat
