= Order of Sultan Sharafuddin Idris Shah =

Order of Sultan Sharafuddin Idris Shah Darjah Kebesaran Sultan Sharafuddin Idris Shah

Awarded by Sultan of Selangor
- Type: Dynastic order of merit
- Founded: 14 December 2002
- Status: Currently constituted
- Founder: Sultan Sharafuddin Idris Shah
- Classes: Knight Grand Companion (SSIS); Knight Companion (DSIS); Companion (SIS); Member (AIS)
- Post-nominals: S.S.I.S.; D.S.I.S.; S.I.S.; A.I.S.

Statistics
- First induction: 10 April 2003
- Last induction: 11 December 2025
- Total inductees: SSIS - maximum 40 people DSIS - maximum 600 people

Precedence
- Next (higher): Order of the Crown of Selangor
- Next (lower): Distinguished Service Star
- Equivalent: Order of Sultan Salahuddin Abdul Aziz Shah
- Knight Grand Companion Knight Companion / Companion / Member; Ribbon bar

The Order of Sultan Sharafuddin Idris Shah (Bahasa Melayu: Darjah Kebesaran Sultan Sharafuddin Idris Shah) is an order awarded by Sultan of Selangor as a reward for general services to the sultan and state of Selangor. It was founded on 14 December 2002 to replace the abolished Order of Sultan Salahuddin Abdul Aziz Shah. The order is awarded to high-ranking individuals who have contributed excellence to the Sultan of Selangor and His Majesty's Government.

== Classes ==
The four classes of appointment to the Order are, in descending order of precedence:

1. Knight Grand Companion or Dato' Setia Sultan Sharafuddin Idris Shah (SSIS)
2. Knight Companion or Dato' Sultan Sharafuddin Idris Shah (DSIS)
3. Companion or Setia Sultan Sharafuddin Idris Shah (SIS)
4. Member or Ahli Sultan Sharafuddin Idris Shah (AIS)

Dato' Setia Sultan Sharafuddin Idris Shah (SSIS) can only be awarded to two people at one time and the maximum number of recipients is 40 people. Dato' Sultan Sharafuddin Idris Shah (DSIS) can be awarded up to 20 people at one time and the maximum number of recipients is 600 people.

== Styles ==
Male recipients of Dato' Setia Sultan Sharafuddin Idris Shah (SSIS) will carry the title Dato' Setia and their female spouse Datin Setia. Female recipients of the order will carry the title Datin Paduka Setia. Husband to the female recipients will not carry any title. Male recipients of Dato' Sultan Sharafuddin Idris Shah (DSIS) will carry the title Dato' and their female spouse Datin. Female recipients of the order will carry the title Datin Paduka. Husband to the female recipients will not carry any title.

Recipients of Setia Sultan Sharafuddin Idris Shah (SIS) and Ahli Sultan Sharafuddin Idris Shah (AIS) will not carry any title.

== Appearances ==
=== Knight Grand Companion ===
It is awarded in a set of breast star, a collar, a badge and a yellow coloured sash with two red stripes, worn from right shoulder to the left waist.

The collar is made of gold-plated silver. It is 132 cm long and worn on the same length at the front and back. This necklace has 14 connecting chain links. The two middle chains contain compositions of two crossed Selangor flags. Six of the remaining chain links are round and the other six are nonagon in shape, and are arranged alternately. The round shaped links contain the word "Sultan Idris Shah" while the rest contain "Selangor Darul Ehsan" phrase. They are written in Islamic calligraphy. Each of these compositions are made of enamel.

The breast star is made of gold-plated silver, its surface length is 9 cm long and has nine fractions. In the center of this star is the word "Sultan Idris Shah Selangor", written both in rumi and khat, with red enamel as its base.

The badge has the same design as the breast star. Its surface length is 6 cm long. The center part of the badge is oval in shape, 2.07 cm wide and 3.05 cm high. It has engraving of the word "Sultan Idris Shah Selangor" in rumi on red enamel background. At the top part of the badge, there is a decoration in the form of the Sultan's crown which is 2.2 cm in height. This badge is made to be suspended on the collar or sash.

The sash is made of yellow silk cloth 11.7 cm in width for male, 7.7 cm for female, with two 0.2 cm wide red stripes on each sides.

=== Knight Companion ===
It is awarded in a set of breast star, a badge and a red coloured sash with two yellow stripes, worn from right shoulder to the left waist.

The shape of the breast star is the same as the Knight Grand Companion's. The center of the star contains the royal symbol. The symbol is shown on emerald green background, replacing the engraved script in red enamel background in the former. The badge is also of the same size and shape as Knight Grand Companion's but with emerald green enamel background.

The sash is made of red silk cloth 11.7 cm in width for male, 7.7 cm for female, with two 0.3 cm wide yellow stripes on each sides.

== Recipients ==
=== Knights Grand Companion (S.S.I.S.) ===
- 2002: Tengku Muhamad Yusof Shah
- 2002: Tengku Puteri Nor Zehan
- 2003: Abdul Gani Patail
- 2003: Syed Anwar Tuanku Syed Putra Jamalullail
- 2003: Tengku Zerafina binti Sultan Sharafuddin Idris Shah
- 2004: Mohd Anwar Mohd Nor
- 2004: Mohd. Tamyes Abdul Wahid
- 2005: Tan Sri Dato' Setia Ambrin Buang
- 2010: Tengku Zatashah binti Sultan Sharafuddin Idris Shah
- 2011: Tengku Amir Shah
- 2011: Khalid Abu Bakar
- 2013: Colin Salem Parbury
- 2013: Aubry Rahim Mennesson
- 2016: Abdul Wahid Omar
- 2018: Tunku Irinah
- 2019: Tengku Permaisuri Norashikin
- 2020: Mohd Na'im Mokhtar
- 2020: Habibah Abdul Rahim
- 2022: Anhar Opir
- 2023: Haris Kasim
- 2023: Tan Hui Meng
- 2024: Nik Suhaimi Nik Sulaiman
- 2025: Mazlan Mansor
- 2025: Mark Yeoh
- 2025: Anuar Onah

=== Knights Companion (D.S.I.S.) ===
- 2003: Johari Abdul Ghani
- 2010: Ab Halim Tamuri
- 2019: Syed Haizam Hishamuddin Putra Jamalullail bin Syed Anwar Jamalullail

== See also ==
- Orders, decorations, and medals of the Malaysian states and federal territories#Selangor
- List of post-nominal letters (Selangor)
