= Chief of Navy (Malaysia) =

Royal Malaysian Navy appointment

- Panglima Tentera Laut ڤڠليما تنترا لاءوت
- Crest of Chief of Navy

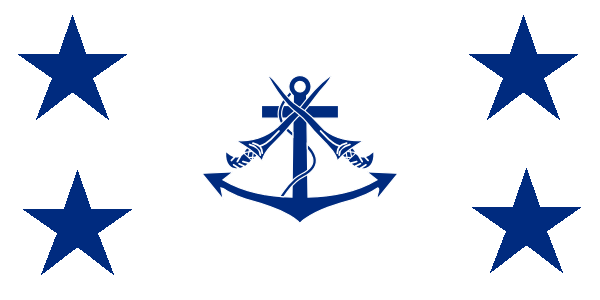
- Flag of Chief of Navy

- Incumbent; Admiral Tan Sri Zulhelmy Ithnain since 23 September 2024
- Royal Malaysian Navy
- Style: Yang Berbahagia (The Honorable)
- Type: Chief
- Member of: Malaysian Armed Forces Council
- Reports to: Chief of Defence Forces
- Term length: Not fixed
- Formation: 15 May 1957
- First holder: Commodore Edward Dudley Norman
- Salary: TURUS II
- Website: www.navy.mil.my - leadership

The Chief of Navy (Malay: Panglima Tentera Laut) is the most senior appointment in the Royal Malaysian Navy and has been held by a four-star officer in the rank of admiral since 2002. The Chief of Navy is a member of the Malaysian Armed Forces Council and directly reports to the Chief of Defence Forces.

The current Chief of Navy is Laksamana Datuk Zulhelmy Ithnain who succeeded Laksamana Tan Sri Abdul Rahman Ayob on 23 September 2024.

== Appointees ==
No.	Portrait	Name (born–died)	Term of office			Ref.
No.	Portrait	Name (born–died)	Took office	Left office	Time in office	Ref.
Senior Officer, Royal Malayan Navy
1		Commodore; Edward Dudley Norman (Note: Served in the Royal Navy.) (1910–1998)	15 May 1957	7 February 1960	2 years, 268 days	
Captain of the Navy, Malaya
2		Captain; William John Dovers (Note: Served in the Royal Australian Navy.) (1918–2007)	8 February 1960	13 July 1962	2 years, 155 days	
Chief of Navy
3		Commodore; Anthony Monckton Synnot (1922–2001)	14 July 1962	March 1965	2 years, 7 months	
4		Commodore; Allen Nelson Dollard (1917–2009)	March 1965	30 November 1968	3 years, 8 months	
5		Rear Admiral Tan Sri Dato' Seri; K. Thanabalasingam (born c. 1936)	1 December 1968	31 December 1976	8 years, 30 days	
6		Vice Admiral Dato'; Mohd Zain Mohd Salleh (born 1935)	1 January 1977	31 December 1985	8 years, 364 days	
7		Vice Admiral Tan Sri; Abdul Wahab Nawi (–)	1 January 1986	31 October 1991	5 years, 303 days	
8		Vice Admiral Tan Sri; Mohd Shariff Ishak (1941–1995)	1 November 1991	12 October 1996	4 years, 346 days	
9		Vice Admiral Tan Sri; Ahmad Ramli Mohd Nor (born 1943)	13 October 1996	14 October 1998	2 years, 1 day	
10		Admiral Tan Sri Dato' Seri; Abu Bakar Abdul Jamal (born 1946)	15 October 1998	12 August 2001	2 years, 301 days	
11		Admiral Tan Sri; Mohd Ramly Abu Bakar (born 1948)	13 August 2001	13 October 2003	2 years, 61 days	
12		Admiral Tan Sri Dato' Seri; Mohd Anwar Mohd Nor (born 1950)	13 October 2003	27 April 2005	1 year, 196 days	
13		Admiral Tan Sri; Ilyas Din (1951–2018)	28 April 2005	14 November 2006	1 year, 200 days	
14		Admiral Tan Sri; Ramlan Mohamed Ali (born 1952)	15 November 2006	31 March 2008	1 year, 137 days	
15		Admiral Tan Sri; Abdul Aziz Jaafar (born 1956)	1 April 2008	18 November 2015	7 years, 231 days	
16		Admiral Tan Sri; Ahmad Kamarulzaman Ahmad Badaruddin (born 1977)	19 November 2015	29 November 2018	3 years, 10 days	
17		Admiral Tan Sri; Mohd Reza Mohd Sany (born 1963)	30 November 2018	26 January 2023	4 years, 57 days	
18		Admiral Tan Sri; Abdul Rahman Ayob (born 1964)	27 January 2023	22 September 2024	1 year, 239 days	
19		Admiral Tan Sri; Zulhelmy Ithnain (born 1968)	23 September 2024	Incumbent	2 years, 20 days	

== See also ==
- Royal Malaysian Navy
- Chief of Defence Forces
- Chief of Army (Malaysia)
- Chief of Air Force (Malaysia)
- Deputy Chief of Navy (Malaysia)
