= Department of Higher Education (Malaysia) =

Government department in Malaysia

- Jabatan Pendidikan Tinggi

Department overview
- Formed: 27 March 2004; 22 years ago
- Preceding Department: Jabatan Pengajian Tinggi
- Jurisdiction: Government of Malaysia
- Headquarters: Level 9, No. 2, Menara 2, Jalan P5/6, Precinct 5, Federal Government Administrative Centre, 62200 Putrajaya
- Employees: 484 (January 2017)
- Annual budget: MYR 93,258,150 (2017)
- Department executive: Husaini Omar, Director General of Higher Education
- Website: jpt.mohe.gov.my

The Department of Higher Education (Malay: Jabatan Pendidikan Tinggi), abbreviated JPT, is a department of the Malaysian Ministry of Education that is responsible for higher education. Its main office is in Putrajaya.

== Background ==
The functions of the JPT were originally within the purview of the Ministry of Education (MOE) until the departments and agencies responsible for higher education were separated from the MOE on 27 March 2004 and established as a full ministry under a Federal Minister. In 2013, the Prime Minister, Najib Razak, merged the Ministry of Education and the Ministry of Higher Education into a single Ministry of Education. In 2015, the Ministry was reestablished.

== Organisation ==
The JPT is headed by the Director General of Higher Education, YBhg. Datin Paduka Ir. Dr. Siti Hamisah binti Tapsir. The director general is assisted by two deputies, YBrs. Dr. Mohd Nor Azman bin Hassan, who oversees the affairs of Private Higher Education Institutions (Private HEIs), while the post for the second is currently vacant.

The following divisions and centres are under the purview of the JPT:

=== Management Services Division ===
Malay: Bahagian Khidmat Pengurusan (BKPJPT), is headed by its director, Puan Norhazimah binti Che Hassan. BKPJPT provides support services to the Department of Higher Education (JPT) so that the management and operation of the department implemented effectively, efficiently, with integrity, systematic and customer-friendly.

=== Industrial Relations Division ===
Malay: Bahagian Hubungan Industri (BHI), is headed by its director, YBhg. Prof. Madya Dr. Arham bin Abdullah. The primary function of BHI is to encourage and intensify the collaboration between academia, industry, government and community. This is to ensure the goal outlined in Shift 1, Shift 2, Shift 4 and Shift 7 of the Malaysian Education Blueprint 2015-2025 (Higher Education) can be met successfully.

=== HEI Excellence Planning Division ===
Malay: Bahagian Perancangan Kecemerlangan IPT (BPKI), is headed by its director, YBhg. Prof. Dr. Raha binti Abdul Rahim. BPKI spearheading Shift 7 of the Malaysian Education Blueprint 2015-2025 (Higher Education) in research and innovation. BPKI aims to build and strengthen the capacity of research and development (R&D) in HEI in order to propel Malaysia towards a high-income country based on knowledge, innovation and creativity by 2020.

=== Student Development Division ===
Malay: Bahagian Pembangunan Mahasiswa (BPMs), is headed by its director, YBhg. Prof. Madya Dr. Sopian bin Bujang. BPMs plan and coordinate the foundation of personality development strategy, partriotisme and national unity among students in Malaysia in order to develop a balance student in terms of knowledge and morals in line with national aspirations.

=== Academic Development Management Division ===
Malay: Bahagian Pengurusan Pembangunan Akademik (BPPA), is headed by its director, Dr. Aishah binti Abu Bakar. BPPA responsible for planning, coordinating and implementing the national policy decisions related to programs and academic direction in Public Higher Education Institutions (Public HEI) in Malaysia. The main goal of this section to ensure that the Public HEI receives quality and timely services for all matters related to academic that requires ministry intervention.

=== Public HEI Governance Division ===
Malay: Bahagian Governan IPTA (BGA), the division is headed by its director, Cik Norina binti Jamaludin. BGA studies, drafts, updating and enforcing acts related to higher education. In addition, the division manages the appointment of Public HEI key officials and members of National Higher Education Council. The division is also involved in formulating, implementing, monitoring and evaluating policies, programs and activities of Public HEIs.

=== Private HEI Governance Division ===
Malay: Bahagian Governan IPTS (BGS), is headed by its director, YBrs. Dr. Mohamed Ali bin Hj. Abdul Rahman. BGS main role is in the governance of Private HEIs through regulations and Private Higher Education Act (Act 555). BGS play an important role in ensuring that the quality in the services, control of resources and control practices can be preserved.

=== Education Malaysia Division ===
(BEM) is headed by its director, Encik Jamalulail bin Abu Bakar. Formerly known as Malay: Bahagian Pemasaran, BEM function is to coordinate, implement and monitor the activities of internationalization; manage and process education programs recognition application offered by institutions of higher learning in Malaysia to related foreign agencies; monitoring the promotion program under the Education Malaysia Global Services (EMGS) and complaints against EMGS in relation to health issues and student visas; reviewing, managing and coordinating the endowed chair abroad under the Ministry of Higher Education (MOHE) and implementing chair endowment programs as well as managing and coordinating the visits of foreign delegation. In addition, the BEM is also responsible for supervising and monitoring the affairs of Malaysian students through the facilities and services provided by Education Malaysia (EM) offices in overseas; processing No Objection Certificate (NOC) applications and the applications of Malaysian students who want to study in the Middle East.

=== Private Standards Division ===
Malay: Bahagian Standard Swasta (BSS), is headed by its director, Puan Aidawati binti Misdar. BSS is tasked with the management the Private HEI application as well as helping to improve the quality and sustainability of Private HEI. Part of the role is to ensure that the quality of education offered by private higher education sector is world-class and relevant to; the needs of the country against the expansion of access to tertiary education; the need to improve the quality of learning and teaching; diversity of service delivery; changes in the method of financing and investment in higher education. In addition, the BSS is also responsible to ensure Private HEIs has a quality management system in accordance with the prescribed standards.

=== Enforcement and Inspectorate Division ===
Malay: Bahagian Penguatkuasaan Dan Inspektorat (BPI), is headed by its director, Encik Rahman bin Mohd Din. BPI responsible for ensuring the quality and standards of Private Higher Education Institutions (Private HEIs) system remains strong and able to gain international recognition in accordance with the provisions of the Private Higher Education Act (Act 555).

=== Student Admission Management Division ===
Malay: Bahagian Pengurusan Kemasukan Pelajar (BPKP), is headed by its director, Puan Mazula binti Sabudin. Formerly known as UPU (Malay: Unit Pusat Universiti), BPKP serve as planners, managers, coordinators in making and implementing policy, procedures and conditions for student admission into Public Higher Education Institutions (Public HEIs). In addition, BPKP acts as a local recruitment centre (PPS) to manage SPM / equivalent school leavers for a place in public universities, polytechnics, community colleges and civil skills training institutes (ILKA) based on the results of the Cabinet meeting.

=== Malaysia Citation Centre ===
Malay: Pusat Sitasi Malaysia (PSM), is headed by its director, YBhg. Prof. Madya Dr. Zuraidah binti Abd Manaf. Better known as MCC, PSM envision to become the national centre for indexing bibliometrics and citation analysis of scientific publications from researchers in Malaysia.

== List of Directors General of Higher Education ==
Director General of Higher Education
- Ketua Pengarah Pendidikan Tinggi
- Incumbent; Prof. Dr. Azlinda Azman since 31 May 2023
- Department of Higher Education
- Style: Yang Berbahagia (The Honourable)
- Reports to: Ministry of Higher Education
- Seat: Level 9, No. 2, Menara 2, Jalan P5/6, Precinct 5, Federal Government Administrative Centre, 62200 Putrajaya
- Appointer: Minister of Higher Education
- Formation: 2004
- First holder: Hassan Said
- Website: jpt.mohe.gov.my

The following is a list of former and current Directors General of Higher Education.

No.	Directors General of Higher Education		Term of office	
No.	Portrait	Name (Birth–Death)	Took office	Left office
1		Professor Emeritus Dato' Dr. Hassan bin Said (b. 1955)	1 May 1998	30 April 2008
2		Dato' Ir. Dr. Radin Umar bin Radin Sohadi (1950–2013)	2 June 2008	31 December 2010
3		Dato' Prof. Dr. Rujhan bin Mustafa (1964–2022)	1 June 2011	14 April 2013
4		Dato' Prof. Dr. Morshidi bin Sirat (b. Unknown)	16 April 2013	31 May 2014
5		Datuk Prof. Dr. Asma binti Ismail (b. 1958)	1 June 2014	3 October 2016
6		Datin Paduka Ir. Dr. Siti Hamisah binti Tapsir (b. 1961)	16 January 2017	28 November 2019
7		Prof. Dato' Seri Dr. Mohamed Mustafa Ishak (b. Unknown)	4 May 2020	10 January 2021
8		Prof. Dato' Dr. Husaini bin Omar (b. 1963)	1 February 2021	9 March 2023
9		Prof. Dr. Azlinda binti Azman (b. 1968)	31 May 2023	Incumbent

== See also ==
- Education in Malaysia
