= Datin =

Datin was an oracular deity also associated with oaths and justice worshipped in pre-Islamic northern Arabia.
