= Order of the Crown of Selangor =

Honorific order of the Sultanate of Selangor

The Most Illustrious Order of the Crown of Selangor Darjah Kebesaran Mahkota Selangor Yang Amat Mulia

Awarded by the Sultan of Selangor
- Type: Dynastic order of merit
- Founded: 6 June 1961
- Status: Currently constituted
- Founder: Sultan Salahuddin Abdul Aziz Shah
- Sovereign: Sultan Sharafuddin Idris Shah
- Classes: Grand Commander; Commander; Companion; Member
- Post-nominals: S.P.M.S.; D.P.M.S.; S.M.S.; A.M.S.

Statistics
- First induction: 28 March 1963
- Last induction: 11 December 2025

Precedence
- Next (higher): Royal Family Order of Selangor
- Next (lower): Order of Sultan Sharafuddin Idris Shah; Order of Sultan Salahuddin Abdul Aziz Shah (dormant)
- Grand Commander Commander Companion / Member; Ribbon bars

The Most Illustrious Order of the Crown of Selangor (Bahasa Melayu: Darjah Kebesaran Mahkota Selangor Yang Amat Mulia) is an order awarded by Sultan of Selangor as a reward for general services to the sultan and state of Selangor. It was founded in 1961. The order is awarded to the relatives of the Sultan of Selangor as well as high-ranking individuals who have contributed excellence to the Sultan of Selangor and the Sultan's Government. The Sultan also has the right to bestow this Degree of Excellence to anyone whom he deems fit and appropriate to receive it.

== History ==
Established on 6 June 1961 by Sultan of Selangor Sultan Salahuddin Abdul Aziz Shah as a reward for general services to the sultan and state of Selangor. His Majesty also established the Royal Family Order of Selangor at the same day, this was to awarded to members of the Selangor and other Royal families, and to high officers of state.

== Grades ==
The four classes of appointment to the Order are, in descending order of precedence:

1. Grand Commander or Seri Paduka Mahkota Selangor (SPMS)
2. Commander or Dato Paduka Mahkota Selangor (DPMS)
3. Companion or Setia Mahkota Selangor (SMS)
4. Member or Ahli Mahkota Selangor (AMS)

=== Grand Commander ===
It is awarded in a set of breast star, a collar, a badge and a red coloured sash with a yellow stripe, worn from right shoulder to the left waist.

The collar is made of silver-plated metal and enamel. It is worn on the same length at the front and back. For male recipients, the collar is 100.6 cm long while it is 78.74 cm for female recipients. The differences is because the female's collar is designed to be worn at the neck so it is made without the two chain link in the middle of the male's collar. This necklace has 14 connecting chain link for male, and 12 for female. The two middle chains contain two frames of the Selangor flag that are combined with crescent moon and star. To his left and right are two rubber leaves compositions. All these compositions are made of enamel.

The rest of the chain links are round in shape and adorned with coconut leaves around them. These compositions are arranged into four pairs, each of which contains three different types of chromatic compositions, the first containing the word Selangor in jawi, the second contains two crossed fragments of coconut leaves, and the third contains crescent and stars. Each of these compositions is made of shadowed thin, red enamel metal.

The breast star is made of silver-plated metal, its surface length is 6.985 cm long and has five arise fractions, complete with circles at the end of each of these fractions, and made of red enamel metal. In the center of this star is a circle of 3.175 cm long bearing the symbol of Selangor state with yellow enamel as the base.

The badge is made of silver-plated metal. It is five pointed and decorated just like the breast star. It is also decorated with the engraving of the Selangor State Emblem on red enamel. This badge is made to be suspended on the collar or sash.

The sash is made of red silk cloth 10.16 cm in width for male, 5.715 cm for female, with a 2.54 cm wide yellow band in the center.

Male recipients of Seri Paduka Mahkota Selangor (SPMS) will carry the title Dato' Seri and their female spouse Datin Seri. Female recipients of the order will carry the title Datin Paduka Seri. Husband to the female recipients will not carry any title. The title Dato' Seri is a new title that has been approved in a State Executive Council meeting dated 23 December 1998 on the consent of the Sultan of Selangor. Previously, male recipients use the title Dato' and his spouse Datin, while Datin Paduka is the title given to female recipients.

Seri Paduka Mahkota Selangor (SPMS) can only be awarded to two people at one time and the maximum number of recipients is 40 people.

=== Commander ===
It is awarded in a set of breast star, a badge and a red coloured sash with a yellow stripe, worn from right shoulder to the left waist.

The shape and size of the badge is the same as the Grand Commander's except the symbols are shown on a flat background, replacing the engraved emblem in the red enamel background in the former. The breast star is also of the same size and shape as Grand Commander's but without the five-pointed silver star.

The male sash is made of 10 cm wide red silk cloth with a 2 cm wide yellow band in the middle. To the left and right of the band are two 0.35 cm wide red strips and two 0.35 cm wide yellow strips. The female sash is 5.7 cm in width with a 1.14 cm wide yellow band in its center. Similar to the male sash, it has two red strips and two yellow strips, both are 0.19 cm wide to the right of the yellow band in the middle of the sash.

The sash was included in the award from 25 February 1999.

Male recipients of Dato Paduka Mahkota Selangor (DPMS) will carry the title Dato' and their female spouse Datin. Female recipients of the order will carry the title Datin Paduka. Husbands of female recipients will not carry any title.

Dato Paduka Mahkota Selangor (DPMS) can be awarded up to 20 people at one time and the maximum number of recipients is 600 people.

=== Companion ===
The Companion or Setia Mahkota Selangor (SMS) was established in 1961 and was not carry any title.

=== Member ===
The Member or Ahli Mahkota Selangor (AMS) was established in 1982 and was not carry any title.

== Recipients ==
=== Knights Grand Commander (S.P.M.S.) ===
The knight grand commander receives the title Dato' Seri and his wife Datin Seri, while women individuals receives the title Datin Paduka Seri.

- 1961: Tunku Abdul Rahman
- 1965: Abdul Razak Hussein
- 1971: Harun Idris
- 1973: Omar Ong Yoke Lin
- 1975: Yaacob Abdul Latiff
- 1976: Datu Mustapha Datu Harun
- 1977: Ismail Mohamed Ali
- 1978: Mahathir Mohamad
- 1979: Abdul Jamil Abdul Rais
- 1980: Harris Salleh
- 1982: Tengku Razaleigh Hamzah
- 1982: Musa Hitam
- 1985: Tan Siew Sin
- 1987: Hamzah Abu Samah
- 1988: Abu Hassan Omar
- 1989: Mohamed Hashim Mohd Ali
- 1991: Muhammad Muhammad Taib
- 1994: Siti Hasmah Mohamad Ali
- 1994: Ahmad Zaidi Adruce
- 1996: Yeoh Tiong Lay
- 1999: Aishah Ghani
- 2000: Abdullah Ahmad Badawi
- 2001: ~~Khir Toyo~~ (revoked 30 September 2015)
- 2002: Endon Mahmood
- 2003: Ahmad Fairuz Abdul Halim
- 2004: ~~Najib Razak~~ (suspended on 6 May 2019, revoked on 12 September 2022)
- 2005: ~~Rosmah Mansor~~ (suspended on 6 May 2019, revoked on 12 September 2022)
- 2005: Tengku Amir Shah
- 2006: Musa Hassan
- 2007: Jeanne Abdullah
- 2009: Abdul Khalid Ibrahim
- 2009: Arshad Ayub
- 2010: Ismail Omar
- 2010: Abdul Rahman Arshad
- 2011: Mohd Sidek Hassan
- 2011: Abdul Aziz Jaafar
- 2012: Arifin Zakaria
- 2012: Zulkifeli Mohd Zin
- 2013: Ali Hamsa
- 2014: Raja Mohamed Affandi
- 2015: Azmin Ali
- 2016: Tengku Permaisuri Norashikin
- 2017: Zulkiple Kassim
- 2018: Zulkifli Zainal Abidin
- 2019: Amirudin Shari
- 2020: Noor Hisham Abdullah
- 2020: Zamrose Mohd Zain
- 2021: Mohd Zuki Ali
- 2022: Tengku Zafrul Aziz
- 2023: Mohammad Ab Rahman
- 2023: Razarudin Husain
- 2024: Wan Ahmad Dahlan Abdul Aziz
- 2025: Afzaa Fadini Abdul Aziz
- 2025: Shamsul Azri Abu Bakar
- 2025: Jeffrey Cheah
- 2026: Fadillah Yusof
- 2026: Wan Ahmad Farid Wan Salleh

=== Knights Commander (D.P.M.S.) ===
The knight commander receives the title Dato' and his wife Datin, while women individuals receives the title Datin Paduka.

- 1964: Lokman Yusof
- 1966: Ong Hock Thye
- 1976: Mohd Sany Abdul Ghaffar
- 1977: Aishah Ghani
- 1977: Michael Chen Wing Sum
- 1978: Lew Sip Hon
- 1979: Lee Kim Sai
- 1979: Rafidah Aziz
- 1979: Samy Vellu
- 1980: Azman Hashim
- 1980: Lim Goh Tong
- 1981: Abu Hassan Omar
- 1981: Rosemary Chow Poh Kheng
- 1983: Siti Hasmah Mohamad Ali
- 1983: Yeoh Tiong Lay
- 1985: Yap Pian Hon
- 1988: Abdul Khalid Ibrahim
- 1988: Onn Ismail
- 1992: Ling Liong Sik
- 1992: Khir Johari
- 1993: Zainal Abidin Ahmad
- 1994: Abdul Rahim Mohd Noor
- 1994: Mustapa Mohamed
- 1996: Ting Chew Peh
- 2000: Abdul Aziz Shamsuddin
- 2001: Noh Omar
- 2001: Mohd Zin Mohamed
- 2001: Ismail Kijo
- 2001: Ahmad Kamal Abdullah
- 2001: Dzulkifli Abdul Razak
- 2002: Donald Lim Siang Chai
- 2002: Karim Mansor
- 2003: Chua Jui Meng
- 2003: Lee Lam Thye
- 2003: Wong Sai Hou
- 2003: Zainuddin Maidin
- 2003: Dell Akbar Khan
- 2005: Ong Ka Ting
- 2005: Azalina Othman Said
- 2005: Ahmad Hasbullah Mohd Nawawi
- 2007: Mohd Najib Abdul Aziz
- 2008: Khalid Abu Bakar
- 2010: Teng Chang Khim
- 2011: Hasan Mohamed Ali
- 2012: Syed Danial Syed Ahmad
- 2014: Ahmad Yunus Hairi
- 2014: Iskandar Abdul Samad
- 2016: Tengku Zafrul Aziz
- 2016: Husaini Omar
- 2016: Haron Din
- 2018: Mohd Reza Mohd Sany
- 2019: Abdul Rahman Ayob
- 2022: Roslan Sulaiman
- 2023: Ng Suee Lim
- 2024: Izham Hashim
- 2025: Fahmi Fadzil
- 2025: Rizam Ismail
- 2025: Ahmad Farhan Mohd Sadullah

== See also ==
- Orders, decorations, and medals of the Malaysian states and federal territories#Selangor
- Orders, decorations, and medals of Selangor
- List of post-nominal letters (Selangor)
