= Malaysian military ranks =

The following tables present the ranks of the Malaysian Armed Forces.

== Rank list ==
ATM SSPA Grade (New)	ATM SSM Grade (Former)	Civil SSM Grade Equiv. (Former)	Type	Army	Navy	Air Force	NATO equivalents of ranks
Usually reserved for His Majesty the King			Commander-in-chief (Note: This rank is usually reserved to the King of Malaysia.)	Field Marshal	Admiral of the Fleet	Marshal of the Air Force	OF-10
VUZ3	VUZA3 (Note: This grade is reserved to the Chief of Defence Force only.)	Turus II	Commissioned officers	General	Admiral	General	OF-9
VUZ5	VUZA5 (Note: This grade is reserved to the Chiefs of Army, Chief of Air Force and Chief of Navy only.)	JUSA A	Commissioned officers	General	Admiral	General	OF-9
VUZ6	VUZA6	JUSA B	Commissioned officers	Lieutenant General (Note: Colonel-in-Chiefs of the Army wear this rank.)	Vice Admiral (Note: Commodore-in-Chief of the Navy (the Sultan of Selangor) wears this rank.)	Lieutenant General (Note: Colonel-in-Chief of the Air Force (the Sultan of Pahang) wears this rank.)	OF-8
VUZ7	VUZA7	JUSA C	Commissioned officers	Major General	Rear Admiral	Major General RMAF	OF-7
Z14	ZA26	54	Commissioned officers	Brigadier General	Commodore (lit. First Admiral)	Brigadier General RMAF	OF-6
Z13	ZA24	52	Commissioned officers	Colonel	Captain	Colonel RMAF	OF-5
Z12	ZA22	48	Commissioned officers	Lieutenant Colonel	Commander	Lieutenant Colonel RMAF	OF-4
Z11	ZA20	46A	Commissioned officers	Major	Lieutenant Commander	Major RMAF	OF-3
Z10	ZA18	44	Commissioned officers	Captain	Lieutenant	Captain RMAF	OF-2
Z9	ZA16	42	Commissioned officers	Lieutenant	Sub Lieutenant	Lieutenant RMAF	OF-1
Z8	ZA15	41	Commissioned officers	Second Lieutenant	Acting Sub Lieutenant	Second Lieutenant RMAF	OF-1
ZL8	ZAL15	-	Officer Cadet	Graduated Officer Cadet	Midshipman (Graduated Officer Cadet)	Graduated Officer Cadet	OF(D)
ZL1	ZAL13	-	Officer Cadet	Appointed Officer Cadet	Appointed Officer Cadet	Appointed Officer Cadet	OF(D)
Z7	ZA12	38	Other ranks	Warrant Officer I	Warrant Officer I	Warrant Officer I	OR-9
Z6	ZA10	36	Other ranks	Warrant Officer II	Warrant Officer II	Warrant Officer II	OR-8
Z5	ZA8	34	Other ranks	Staff Sergeant (Note: Malaysia, as a Commonwealth nation, has a rank structure similar to the British Army. This position may be referred to by a variety of names depending on the regiment or corps, such as "Colour Sergeant".)	Chief Petty Officer	Flight Sergeant	OR-7
Z4	ZA6	29	Other ranks	Sergeant	Petty Officer	Sergeant	OR-6
Z3	ZA4	22	Other ranks	Corporal	Leading Seaman	Corporal	OR-4
Z2	ZA2	20	Other ranks	Lance Corporal	Able Seaman	Leading Aircraftman	OR-3
Z1	ZA1	19	Other ranks	Private (Note: Just like the Staff Sergeant rank, the rank of Private has a variety of names depending on the regiment or corps. Other names for the rank of Private are "Ranger", "Gunner" and "Trooper".)	Ordinary Seaman	Aircraftman	OR-1
ZL	ZAL1	-	Other ranks	Recruit	Recruit	Recruit	

== Rank table ==
This table shows the rank structure and epaulette insignia from 1963 until today. For the ranks in the Malaysian Army, the shoulder board rank insignia for Senior Officers and Junior Officers comprises the star from the Order of the Crown of the Realm.

=== Commissioned officer ranks ===
The rank insignia of commissioned officers, based on the No. 2 and No. 3 Dress Uniform. For the insignia of the RMAF, the "KEHORMAT" was written for honorary officers.

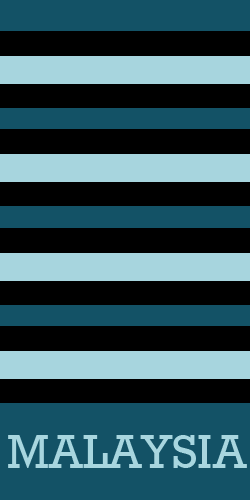
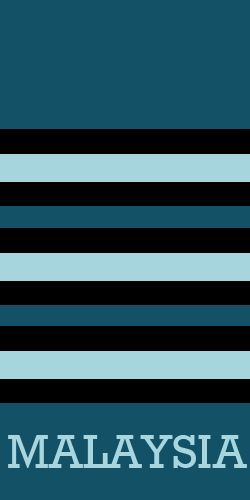
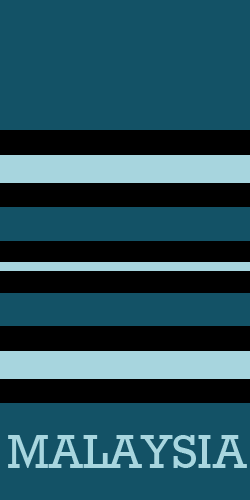
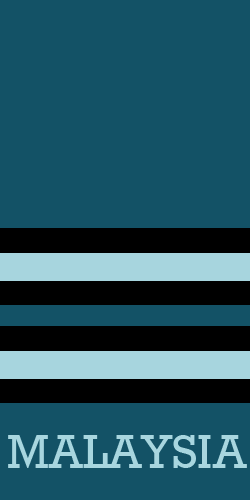
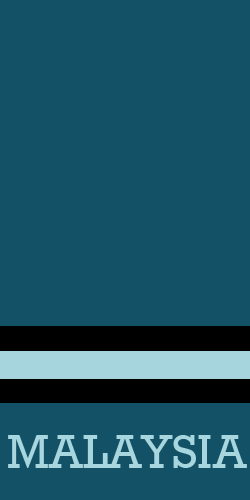
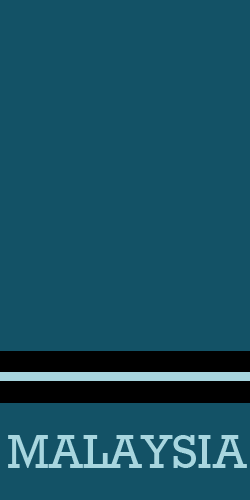
Rank group	General / flag officers					Senior officers			Junior officers
Malaysian Army
Malaysian Army	Fil marsyal	Jeneral	Leftenan jeneral	Mejar jeneral	Brigedier jeneral	Kolonel	Leftenan kolonel	Mejar	Kapten	Leftenan	Leftenan muda
Royal Malaysian Navy
Royal Malaysian Navy	Laksamana armada	Laksamana	Laksamana madya	Laksamana muda	Laksamana pertama	Kepten	Komander	Leftenan komander	Leftenan	Leftenan madya	Leftenan muda
Royal Malaysian Air Force
Royal Malaysian Air Force	Marsyal tentera udara	Jeneral TUDM	Leftenan jeneral TUDM	Mejar jeneral TUDM	Brigedier jeneral TUDM	Kolonel TUDM	Leftenan kolonel TUDM	Mejar TUDM	Kapten TUDM	Leftenan TUDM	Leftenan muda TUDM
Rank group	General / flag officers					Senior officers			Junior officers

=== Student officer ranks ===
Rank group	Student officer
Royal Malaysian Navy
Royal Malaysian Navy	Pegawai kadet kanan	Pegawai kadet

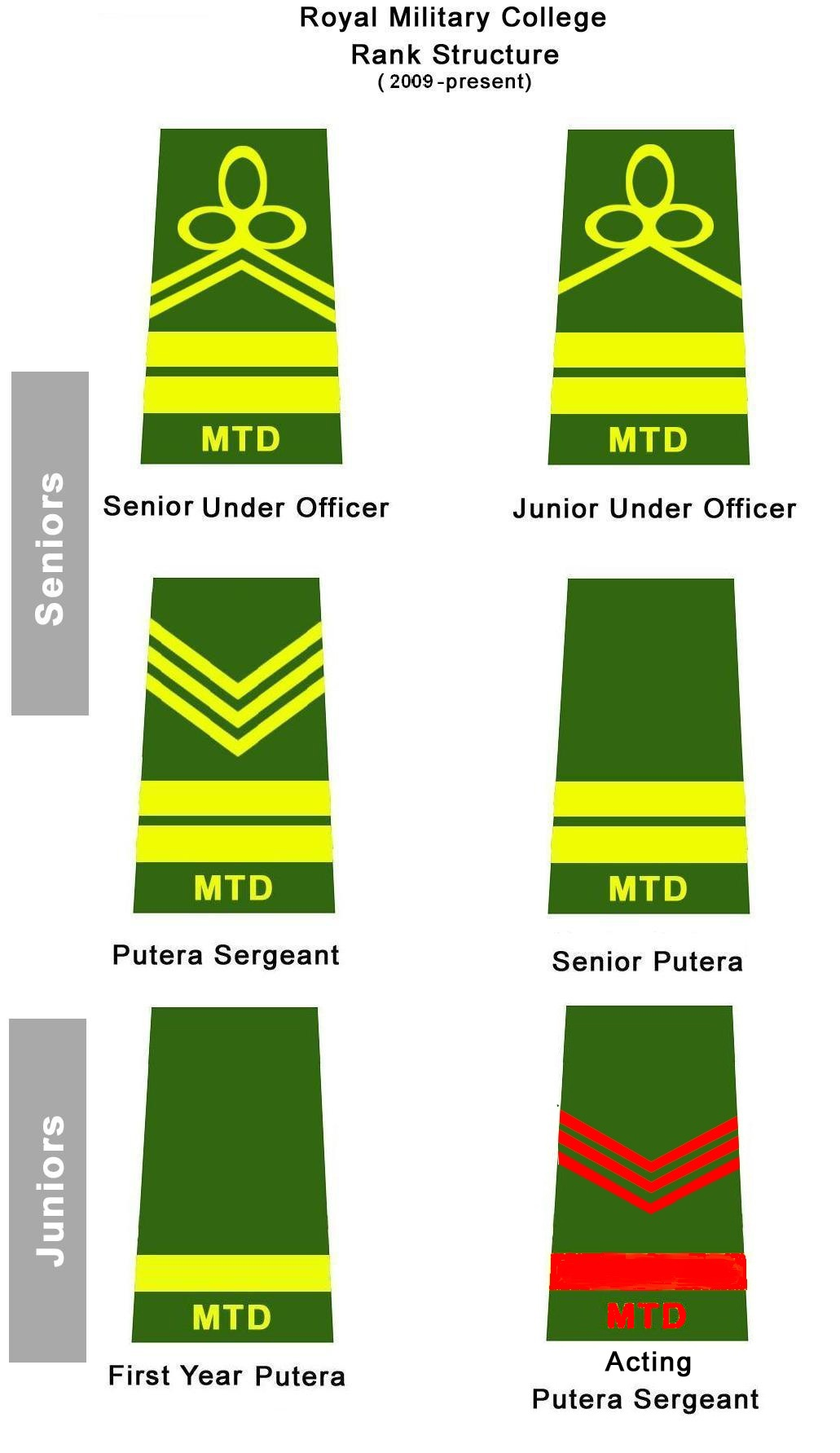
Royal Military College Rank Structure from 2009−present

=== Other ranks ===
The rank insignia of non-commissioned officers (NCOs) and enlisted personnel.

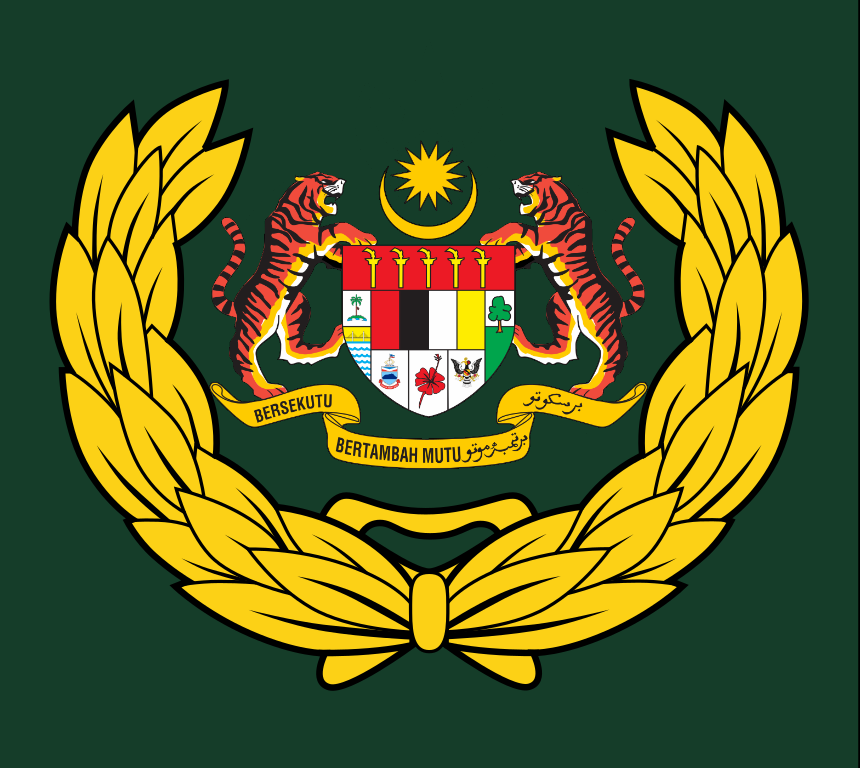
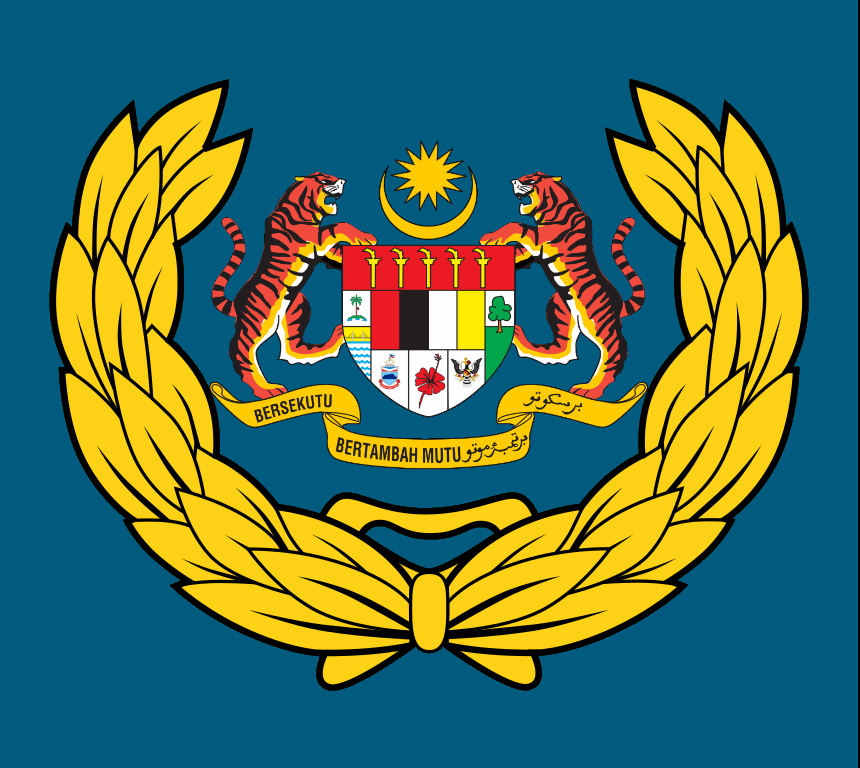
Rank group	Warrant officers		Senior NCOs		Junior NCOs		Enlisted
Malaysian Army								No insignia
Malaysian Army	Pegawai waran I	Pegawai waran II	Staf sarjan	Sarjan	Koperal	Lans koperal		Prebet	Rekrut
Royal Malaysian Navy								No insignia
Royal Malaysian Navy	Pegawai waran I	Pegawai waran II	Bintara kanan	Bintara muda	Laskar kanan	Laskar kelas I	Laskar kelas II	Perajurit muda
Royal Malaysian Air Force							No insignia	No insignia
Royal Malaysian Air Force	Pegawai waran udara I	Pegawai waran udara II	Flait sarjan	Sarjan udara	Koperal udara	Laskar udara kanan	Laskar udara I	Laskar udara II	Perajurit muda
Rank group	Warrant officers		Senior NCOs		Junior NCOs		Enlisted

== Other military-based organization ranks ==
=== Royal Johor Military Force ===
The Royal Johor Military Force ranks are equal to army ranks but with their own insignia and salary scale.

Commissioned officers

Rank group	General / flag officers			Senior officers	Junior officers
Royal Johor Military Force								No insignia
Royal Johor Military Force	Komandan	Mejar Jeneral	Brigedier Jeneral	Mejar	Kapten	Leftenan	Leftenan Muda	Pegawai Kadet

Other ranks

The following are rank insignia for other ranks for the Johor Military Force.

Rank group	Senior NCOs			Junior NCOs		Enlisted
Royal Johor Military Force						No insignia
Royal Johor Military Force	Pegawai Waren/Sarjan Mejar	Staf Sarjan	Sarjan	Korporal	Lans Korporal	Prebet	Rekrut

=== Malaysia Coast Guard ===
Malaysia Coast Guard ranks are equal to the Royal Malaysian Navy's ranks, but the MCG has their service grade and basic salary scale. In addition the MCG does not use the executive curl but instead, the badge of the MCG.

=== RELA Corps ===
The People's Volunteer Corps' (Malay: Jabatan Sukarelawan Malaysia, abbreviated RELA) ranks are equal to army ranks, with their own insignia and salary scale. Only permanent officers have salaries and allowances like other civil service staff but RELA Corps non-commissioned officers and lower rank are only given an allowance.

From 2012, RELA Corps rank system was changed and synchronized with the police rank system but still maintaining old insignia.

Rank group	General / flag officers				Senior officers			Junior officers
The People's Volunteer Corps
The People's Volunteer Corps	Ketua Pesuruhjaya	Timbalan Ketua Pesuruhjaya	Pesuruhjaya	Timbalan Pesuruhjaya	Penolong Pesuruhjaya Kanan	Penolong Pesuruhjaya	Penguasa	Timbalan Penguasa Kanan	Timbalan Penguasa	Penolong Penguasa Kanan

Rank group	Senior NCOs				Junior NCOs		Enlisted
The People's Volunteer Corps
The People's Volunteer Corps	Penolang Penguasa I	Penolong Penguasa II	Pegawal tinggi I	Pegawal tinggi II	Pegawal Kanan I	Pegawal Kanan II

== See also ==
- Malaysia Coast Guard ranks
- Royal Malaysian Police ranks
