= Mohd Khalid Ismail =

Malaysian police officer

Yang Berbahagia Tan Sri Mohd Khalid Ismail PMN SPMP SSPK SSAP SPDK SPTS DGSM DIMP DPTS PGPP PSPP PPS PPA PJPN PJG
- محمد خالد إسماعيل
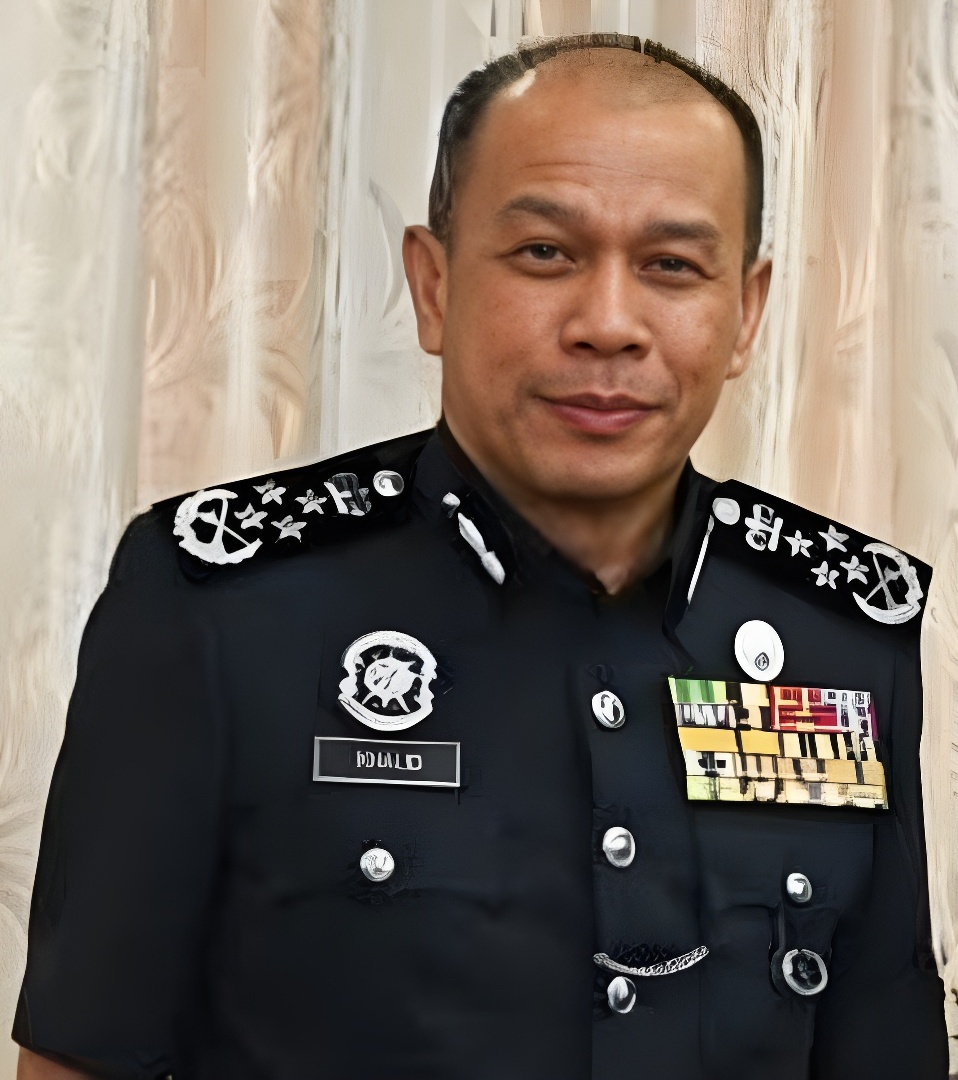

15th Inspector-General of Police (Malaysia)
- Incumbent
- Assumed office 23 June 2025
- Monarch: Ibrahim Iskandar
- Prime Minister: Anwar Ibrahim
- Minister: Saifuddin Nasution Ismail
- Deputy: Ayob Khan Mydin Pitchay (2025–2026); Abdul Aziz Abdul Majid (2026–present)
- Preceded by: Razarudin Husain

Personal details
- Born: Mohd Khalid bin Ismail; 8 April 1965 (age 61) Manong, Kuala Kangsar, Perak, Malaysia
- Spouse: Munirah Che Rose
- Education: Universiti Teknologi MARA (DPA); International Islamic University Malaysia (LLB, MCL)
- Occupation: Police officer

Mohd Khalid bin Ismail (Jawi: محمد خالد بن إسماعيل; born 8 April 1965) is a Malaysian police officer who has served as the 15th Inspector-General of Police (IGP) since June 2025. Prior to his appointment, he was the director of Bukit Aman special branch department from May 2023.

== Early life and education ==
Mohd Khalid Ismail was born on 8 April 1965 in Manong, Kuala Kangsar, Perak. He obtained a diploma in public administration from Universiti Teknologi MARA (UiTM) in 1986. In 2008, he graduated with a bachelor of laws with honours from the International Islamic University Malaysia (IIUM). He later completed a master's degree in comparative laws at the same university in 2013.

== Career ==
Mohd Khalid joined the Royal Malaysia Police (PDRM) on 5 April 1987 as Probationary Inspector after completing his general police training earlier that year. His first posting was at the Special Branch at Bukit Aman police headquarters and served until 1999. Subsequently, from 2002 to 2004, he was posted to the Special Branch in Gombak. Between 2008 and 2010, he held the position of Deputy superintendent of police (DSP) FCCC at the special branch, Bukit Aman.

From 2010 to 2013, Mohd Khalid served as Superintendent of social extremist threats at the Special Branch, Bukit Aman. In 2013 to 2014, he was appointed as Superintendent of security protection, also at the Special Branch, Bukit Aman. Between 2014 and 2018, he was posted as a police attaché and Security Liaison Officer (SLO) at the High Commission of Malaysia in London, United Kingdom. From 2018 to 2021, he served as the head of the Pahang Special Branch.

Mohd Khalid was later appointed as Principal Assistant Director E2, Special Branch, Bukit Aman, from 2021 to 2022. From 2022 to 2023, he held the position of Deputy director I of the Special Branch. On 10 April 2023, he was promoted to Director of the special branch, a role he continued to serve in on a contract basis after his official retirement on 8 April 2025.

On 23 June 2025, Mohd Khalid was appointed as the inspector-general of police (IGP) for a two-year term until 22 June 2027. His appointment was made by the Yang di-Pertuan Agong on the advice of the prime minister and based on the recommendation of the police force commission. He became the second IGP to be appointed without previously serving as deputy inspector-general. (Note: Abdul Hamid Bador and Mohamad Fuzi Harun were exceptions, having served as acting DIGs before their appointments.)

== Honours ==
=== Honours of Malaysia ===
- Malaysia
  - Commander of the Order of the Defender of the Realm (PMN) – Tan Sri (2026)
  - Recipient of the Loyal Service Medal (PPS)
  - Recipient of the General Service Medal (PPA)
  - Recipient of the 16th Yang di-Pertuan Agong Installation Medal (2019)
  - Recipient of the 17th Yang di-Pertuan Agong Installation Medal (2024)
- Royal Malaysia Police
  - Courageous Commander of the Most Gallant Police Order (PGPP) (2023)
  - Loyal Commander of the Most Gallant Police Order (PSPP)
  - Recipient of the National Hero Service Medal (PJPN)
- Kedah
  - Knight Grand Commander of the Glorious Order of the Loyal Warrior of Kedah (SSPK) – Dato' Seri Pahlawan (2026)
- Malacca
  - Grand Commander of the Exalted Order of Malacca (DGSM) – Datuk Seri (2026)
- Pahang
  - Knight Grand Companion of the Order of Sultan Ahmad Shah of Pahang (SSAP) – Dato' Sri (2023)
  - Knight Companion of the Order of the Crown of Pahang (DIMP) – Dato' (2018)
- Perak
  - Knight Grand Commander of the Order of Taming Sari (SPTS) – Dato' Seri Panglima (2025)
  - Knight Commander of the Order of Taming Sari (DPTS) – Dato' Pahlawan (2024)
- Perlis
  - Knight Grand Commander of the Order of the Crown of Perlis (SPMP) – Dato' Seri (2026)
- Sabah
  - Grand Commander of the Order of Kinabalu (SPDK) – Datuk Seri Panglima (2026)

=== Foreign honours ===
- Singapore
  - Recipient of the Meritorious Service Medal (PJG) (2025)
