= Hussin Ismail =

Former Deputy Inspector General of Police

Yang Berbahagia Tan Sri Hussin Ismail PSM PJN SSAP SPTS DPMT PGPP SIS SMP PMP PSPP AMP PPA
- حسين إسماعيل

Deputy Inspector-General of Police (Malaysia)
- In office 13 September 2010 – 14 April 2011
- Preceded by: Ismail Omar
- Succeeded by: Khalid Abu Bakar

Personal details
- Born: 15 April 1953 (age 73) Muar, Johor, Federation of Malaya

Hussin bin Ismail (born 15 April 1953) was a retired Malaysian police officer who served as Deputy Inspector General of Police from 13 September 2010 to 14 April 2011.

== Early life ==
Hussin Ismail was born on 15 April 1953 in Muar, Johor.

== Police career ==
Hussin Ismail began his career in Police Force as Probationary Inspector on 15 December 1971 at Kuala Kubu Baru Police College, Selangor. After complete his training, he started working in Special Branch, Bukit Aman until he was promoted to Inspector on 15 December 1974. On 24 May 1982, he was promoted to Assistant Superintendent of Police and held the position of Staff Officer E1E2, Bukit Aman before became Head of Batu Pahat District Special Branch on 29 July 1984.

After being promoted to Deputy Superintendent of Police on 26 January 1989, he was entrusted to lead the Perlis Contingent Special Branch. Coloring the brilliance of his career, on 26 May 1992, he was appointed Security Liaison Officer in Moscow, Russia and after serving for 30 months in the Union of Soviet Sovereign Republics (USSR), he returned to Malaysia to hold the position of E3 Staff Officer in Sarawak Contingent with the rank of Superintendent of Police on 30 November 1994. On 16 September 1996, he returned to Bukit Aman as an E3C Staff Officer, before attending the Diploma in Police Science Course at the Police College, Kuala Kubu Baru, Selangor starting 24 March 1997.

On 16 April 1998, he was promoted to Assistant Commissioner of Police and served as Petaling Jaya District Police Chief and two years later, on 1 September 2000, he was appointed as Shah Alam District Police Chief. Hussin once again promoted to Senior Assistant Commissioner of Police II on 20 December 2002 as the Head of Special Branch of Perak Contingent. He was promoted to Senior Assistant Commissioner of Police I and became as Terengganu Police Chief on 13 August 2004, and later promoted to the rank of Deputy Commissioner of Police and became Johor Police Chief.

On 24 January 2008, based on his experience and professionalism, Hussin was given the responsibility as the Director of Bukit Aman Internal Security and Public Order Department with the position of Commissioner of Police. On 14 September 2010, he was appointed as Deputy Inspector General of Police on 13 September 2010 preceded by Ismail Omar who appointed as Inspector General of Police, he was retired on 14 April 2011 and was succeeded by Khalid Abu Bakar.

== Post career ==
Hussin currently served as Deputy Chairman of Yayasan Pengaman (Malaysia). In addition, he was appointed to Board of Directors of Jaks Resources Berhad on 28 June 2011 as an Independent Non-Executive Director. On 28 September 2012, he was appointed as Chairman of the company.

He also one of the Board of Directors in a problematic security company called Sovereign Maritime Services (M) Sdn Bhd.[4]

== Honours ==
- Malaysia
  - Commander of the Order of Loyalty to the Crown of Malaysia (PSM) – Tan Sri (2011)
  - Commander of the Order of Meritorious Service (PJN) – Datuk (2009)
  - Recipient of the General Service Medal (PPA)
  - Recipient of the 11th Yang di-Pertuan Agong Installation Medal
  - Recipient of the 12th Yang di-Pertuan Agong Installation Medal
- Royal Malaysia Police
  - Courageous Commander of the Most Gallant Police Order (PGPP) (2008)
  - Loyal Commander of the Most Gallant Police Order (PSPP)
- Pahang
  - Knight Grand Companion of the Order of Sultan Ahmad Shah of Pahang (SSAP) – Dato' Sri (2010)
  - Companion of the Order of the Crown of Pahang (SMP) (2002)
- Perak
  - Knight Grand Commander of the Order of Taming Sari (SPTS) – Dato' Seri Panglima (2011)
  - Commander of the Order of the Perak State Crown (PMP) (2004)
- Perlis
  - Member of the Order of the Crown of Perlis (AMP)
- Selangor
  - Companion of the Order of Sultan Sharafuddin Idris Shah (SIS) (2002)
- Terengganu
  - Knight Commander of the Order of the Crown of Terengganu (DPMT) – Dato' (2005)
