= Mazlan =

Mazlan is both a Malaysian masculine given name and surname. Notable people with the name include:

== Given name ==
- Mazlan Ahmad (1941–2018), Malaysian politician
- Mazlan Bujang, Malaysian politician
- Mazlan Hamzah, Malaysian sprinter
- Mazlan Idris (died 1993), Malaysian murder victim
- Mazlan Ismail, Malaysian politician
- Mazlan Lazim (born 1961), Malaysian police officer
- Mazlan Maidun, Singaporean murderer
- Mazlan Mansor (born 1960), Malaysian police officer
- Mazlan Nordin (1925–2012), Malaysian journalist
- Mazlan Othman (born 1951), Malaysian astrophysicist

== Surname ==
- Ammirul Emmran Mazlan (born 1995), Singaporean footballer
- Faiz Mazlan (born 1997), Malaysian footballer
- Fazly Mazlan (born 1993), Malaysian footballer
- Nurul Azurin Mazlan (born 2000), Malaysian footballer
- Safwan Mazlan (born 2002), Malaysian footballer
