= Ayob Khan Mydin Pitchay =

Malaysian former police officer

Yang Berbahagia Tan Sri Ayob Khan Mydin Pitchay PSM SSAP SPTS DGSM DIMP DMIJ PGPP JSM SDK PSPP BCK PPS PPA PKN
- أيوب خان مايدين ڤيتچاي
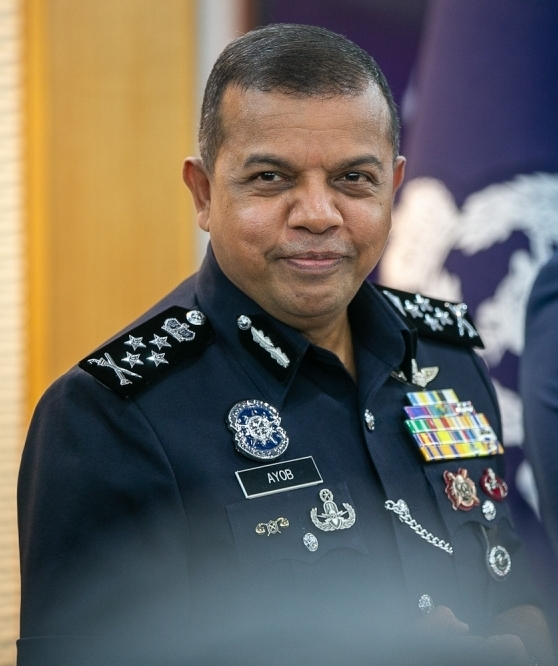

29th Deputy Inspector-General of Police (Malaysia)
- In office 23 June 2023 – 27 July 2026
- Monarchs: Abdullah (2023–2024); Ibrahim Iskandar (2024–2026)
- Prime Minister: Anwar Ibrahim
- Minister: Saifuddin Nasution Ismail
- Inspector-General: Razarudin Husain (2023-2025); Mohd Khalid Ismail (2025–2026)
- Preceded by: Razarudin Husain
- Succeeded by: Ibrahim Darus (acting); Abdul Aziz Abdul Majid

Personal details
- Born: July 27, 1966 (age 60) Kota Setar, Kedah, Malaysia
- Citizenship: Malaysian
- Spouse: Zalena Ariffin
- Education: National University of Malaysia (Master's degree of Information Technology)
- Occupation: Police officer

Ayob Khan bin Mydin Pitchay (Jawi: أيوب خان مايدين ڤيتچاي ; born: 27 July 1966) is a Malaysian former police officer who served as the 29th Deputy Inspector-General of Police (DIG) from June 2023 to his retirement in July 2026.

== Career ==
Originally from Kota Setar, Kedah, Ayob Khan joined the police force in 1993 at the age of 27.Ayob holds a bachelor's degree in business administration and a master's degree in information technology from the National University of Malaysia (UKM).He has served as the director of the Bukit Aman Criminal Investigations Department (CID), director of the Bukit Aman Narcotic Crime Investigation Department (NCID), Johor Police Chief and as head of the Bukit Aman Special Branch Counter Terrorism Division (E8) prior to his promotion to the DIG.

=== Head of Bukit Aman Special Branch Counter Terrorism Division (E8) (2013–2019) ===
==== Operations against terrorist and militant groups ====
As Head of the Bukit Aman Special Branch Counter Terrorism Division (E8) from 2013 to 2019, Ayob Khan led the operations against many terrorist and militant groups which were active ranging from the Islamic State (ISIS) to Abu Sayyaf. He led the operations to success by arresting recruits, middle men of the groups and prevented their plotted attacks in Malaysia.

=== Deputy Inspector General of Police (2023–2026) ===
On 20 June 2023, minister of home affairs Saifuddin Nasution Ismail had an audience with Yang di-Pertuan Agong Abdullah to present the names of candidates for the inspector-general of police (IGP) and DIG positions. It was reported that Ayob Khan, Director of the Bukit Aman Internal Security and Public Order Department Hazani Ghazali, Director of the Bukit Aman NCID Mohd Kamaruddin Md Din and an unknown were the candidates for the DIG position. The next day on 21 June 2023, Saifuddin announced that Ayob Khan was promoted to the DIG position to replace Razarudin Husain who was promoted to the IGP position with effect on 23 June 2023 after Abdullah consented to their appointments. On 26 July 2026, Ayob Khan handed over his duties to director of the Special Branch Ibrahim Durus as the Acting DIG, completing nearly 35 years of service with the Royal Malaysia Police (PDRM) and officially retired the following day on 27 July 2026, his 60th birthday as he reached the mandatory age of requirement.

== Honours ==
- Malaysia
  - Commander of the Order of Loyalty to the Crown of Malaysia (PSM) – Tan Sri (2025)
  - Companion of the Order of Loyalty to the Crown of Malaysia (JSM) (2013)
  - Recipient of the Loyal Service Medal (PPS) (Note: Serving no less than 18 years.)
  - Recipient of the General Service Medal (PPA) (Note: Serving no less than 10 years.)
  - Recipient of the National Sovereignty Medal (PKN)
  - Recipient of the 9th Yang di-Pertuan Agong Installation Medal
  - Recipient of the 10th Yang di-Pertuan Agong Installation Medal
  - Recipient of the 11th Yang di-Pertuan Agong Installation Medal
  - Recipient of the 14th Yang di-Pertuan Agong Installation Medal
  - Recipient of the 17th Yang di-Pertuan Agong Installation Medal
- Royal Malaysia Police
  - Courageous Commander of the Most Gallant Police Order (PGPP) (2023)
  - Loyal Commander of the Most Gallant Police Order (PSPP) (2012)
  - Recipient of the Presentation of Police Colours Medal
- Johor
  - Knight of the Order of Sultan Ibrahim of Johor (DMIJ) – Dato' (2021)
- Kedah
  - Companion of the Order of Loyalty to the Royal House of Kedah (SDK) (2010)
  - Recipient of the State of Kedah Distinguished Service Star (BCK) (2004)
- Malacca
  - Grand Commander of the Exalted Order of Malacca (DGSM) – Datuk Seri (2022)
- Pahang
  - Knight Grand Companion of the Order of Sultan Ahmad Shah of Pahang (SSAP) – Dato' Sri (2023)
  - Knight Companion of the Order of the Crown of Pahang (DIMP) – Dato' (2010)
- Perak
  - Knight Grand Commander of the Order of Taming Sari (SPTS) – Dato' Seri Panglima (2023)
