= Mohd Bakri Mohd Zinin =

Former Deputy Inspector-General of Police

Yang Berbahagia Tan Sri Datuk Seri Panglima Mohd Bakri Mohd Zinin PSM PJN DPSK SPDK PGDK SMW KMN
- محمد بکري محمد زينين
- Mohd Bakri in 2014

Deputy Inspector-General of Police (Malaysia)
- In office 17 May 2013 – 6 September 2014
- Preceded by: Khalid Abu Bakar
- Succeeded by: Mohamad Fuzi Harun (acting) Noor Rashid Ibrahim

Personal details
- Born: 7 September 1954 (age 72) Crown Colony of North Borneo
- Spouse(s): Puan Sri Datin Seri Hajah Rohayah binti Datuk Seri Panglima Haji Mohd Yassin & Puan Sri Nisa

Mohd Bakri bin Mohd Zinin (born 7 September 1954) is a former Malaysian police officer who served as Deputy Inspector-General of Police (DIG), from May 2013 to his retirement in September 2014. He was the first Sabahan to become DIG.

== Early life ==
Mohd Bakri (born 7 September 1954) hails from Penampang, Sabah. He holds a Diploma in Police Science from Universiti Kebangsaan Malaysia (UKM).

== Police career ==
=== Beginning ===
Mohd Bakri began his police career on 6 November 1975, starting as a Probationary Inspector.

Over the years, he served in various capacities, including as the Deputy District Police Chief of Kota Kinabalu and Seremban.

His career trajectory includes significant responsibilities and promotions. Initially, as the District Police Chief, he oversaw the jurisdictions of Kudat, Sandakan, Lahad Datu, Cheras, and Dang Wangi. His journey within the Federal Police (Bukit Aman) Criminal Investigation Department (CID) included serving as the Assistant Director of the Crime Intelligence Unit (D4) at Bukit Aman CID.

In 2003, Mohd Bakri assumed leadership of the Sabah CID, and by 2005, he rose to the position of Sabah Deputy Police Commissioner. In 2006, he took on the role of Deputy Director (Intelligence/Operation) at the Bukit Aman Narcotic CID. Progressing further, he eventually became the director of the same department. His career culminated with his appointment as the CID Director in 2008.

=== National recognition ===
In 2010, Mohd Bakri, then the CID director, spearheaded the investigation and capture of suspects linked to the disappearance of local cosmetic millionaire Datuk Sosilawati Lawiya and her three aides: personal driver Kamaruddin Shamsudin, CIMB Bank Kampung Baru Branch financial consultant Noorhisham Mohammad, and lawyer Ahmad Kamil Abdul Karim.

The San-Diego Union Tribune quoting Associated Press in their article dated 15 September 2010 described the case as having "exploded into a full-scale media sensation."

A task force named Ops Jejak was instituted on September 6, 2010, with Dato' Hadi Ho bin Abdullah, the Deputy Director of the CID (Investigation/Operations), leading the charge.

==== Others that joined ====
- Chief Assistant Director of CID D9 Division (Special Investigations)
- D8 Division (Special Operations) from Bukit Aman
- D9 Division (Special Investigations) from IPK Kuala Lumpur and Selangor
- Criminal Investigation Department
- Commercial Crime Investigation Department
- Forensics
- Special Branch
- Traffic
- Air Unit
- Marine Operations Force
- Selangor Police
- Kuala Lumpur Police

==== Collaborating Agencies and Departments, such as ====
- Fire and Rescue Department
- Chemistry Department
- Mineral and Geoscience Department
- Kuala Langat District Council
- Syabas
- Hospital entities (especially the Pathology Unit)

This led to multiple arrests until 13 October 2010, where four suspects were charged in court under Section 302 of the Penal Code read together with Section 34 of the Penal Code.

==== Outcomes from the investigation ====
On 23 May 2013, former lawyer N. Pathmanabhan, who was 47 year old at the time, and three other field workers – R. Matan, 26, T. Thilaiyalagan, 25, and R. Kathavarayan, 37, – received the death sentence from the Shah Alam High Court.

On March 16, 2017, Chief Justice Arifin Zakaria, leading a panel of five judges, dismissed the final appeal of Pathmanabhan, Thilaiyalagan, and Kathavarayan, upholding the conviction and death sentence. Meanwhile, Matan escaped the gallows after the Federal Court set aside his conviction and death sentence, citing insufficient evidence against him. Chief Justice Arifin deemed it one of his most memorable cases, highlighting that the Sosilawati murder trial was only the second, after the Sunny Ang Soo Suan murder case in 1965, where the court relied on circumstantial evidence to convict without finding the victim's body.

=== Moving on ===
Mohd Bakri was promoted to Deputy Inspector-General of Police in 2013 along with Tan Sri Dato' Sri Khalid Bin Abu Bakar as Inspector-General of Police. The handover ceremony happened on 16 May 2013 at the Police Training Center (Pulapol) Jalan Semarak in Kuala Lumpur.

=== Retirement ===
Mohd Bakri retired on 6 September 2014.

On September 5, there was a handover and farewell ceremony at the Security Hall, Pulapol. He passed the role to Mohamad Fuzi Harun, who acted as the Deputy Inspector-General of Police. (Datuk Seri Noor Rashid Ibrahim later took over from Mohamad Fuzi on December 1.)

In his farewell speech, Bakri expressed his commitment to staying connected to the world of policing even in retirement, stating, "once a policeman, always a policeman."

Mohd Bakri attended his farewell ceremony ("Paluan Berundur" in Malay) at the Parade Square, in the same location. Also in the attendance were former Inspector-General of Police Tan Sri Norian Mai, the lineup of PDRM Directors, various layers of PDRM personnel, and media colleagues.

== Honours ==
- Malaysia
  - Officer of the Order of the Defender of the Realm (KMN) (2001)
  - Commander of the Order of Meritorious Service (PJN) – Datuk (2012)
  - Commander of the Order of Loyalty to the Crown of Malaysia (PSM) – Tan Sri (2014)
- Sabah
  - Commander of the Order of Kinabalu (PGDK) – Datuk (2005)
  - Grand Commander of the Order of Kinabalu (SPDK) – Datuk Seri Panglima (2014)
- Federal Territory (Malaysia)
  - Grand Commander of the Order of the Territorial Crown (SMW) – Datuk Seri (2009)
- Kelantan
  - Knight Commander of the Order of the Loyalty to the Crown of Kelantan (DPSK) – Dato' (2011)
