= National University of Malaysia =

Public research university in Malaysia

- Universiti Kebangsaan Malaysia (Malay)
- Coat of arms
- Motto: Ilmu, Mutu dan Budi
- Motto in English: Knowledge, Quality and Virtue
- Type: Public research university
- Established: 18 May 1970; 56 years ago
- Founders: Syed Nasir Ismail; Mahathir Mohamad; Mohd Rashdan Baba
- Affiliations: ACU, ASAIHL, AUN, AUAP, UAiTED
- Chancellor: Tuanku Muhriz ibni Almarhum Tuanku Munawir
- Vice-Chancellor: Sufian Jusoh
- Pro-Chancellors: Tunku Ali Redhauddin ibni Tuanku Muhriz; Mohd Zuki Ali; Rafiah Salim
- Students: 49,587 (2025)
- Undergraduates: 19,20l (2025)
- Postgraduates: 14,051 (2025)
- Location: Lingkungan Ilmu, 43600 Bangi, Selangor, Malaysia, Bandar Baru Bangi, Selangor, Malaysia; 02°55′30″N 101°46′53″E
- Website: www.ukm.my

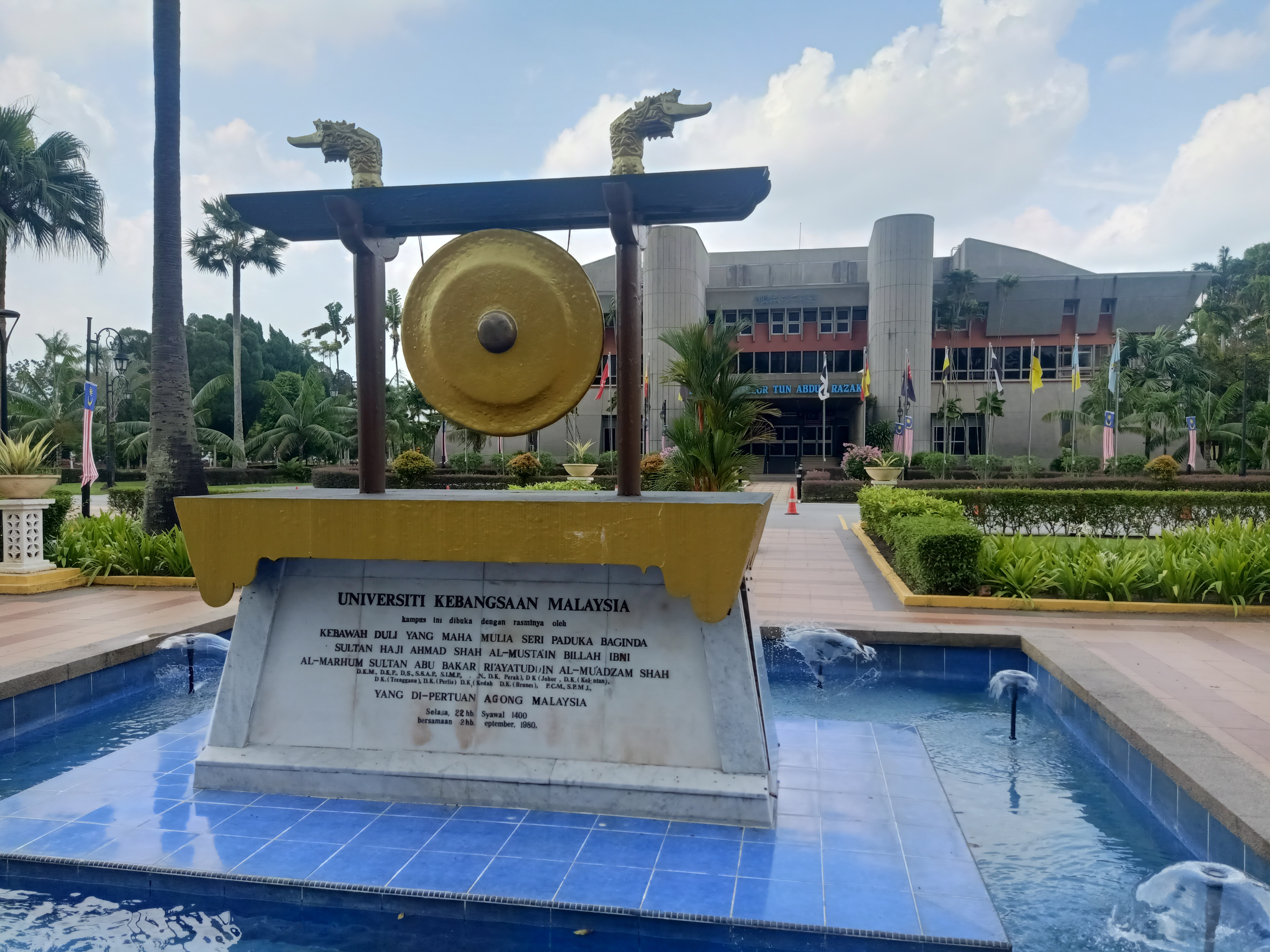
Gong of UKM in front of DECTAR at the main entrance of Bangi campus.

The National University of Malaysia (Malay: Universiti Kebangsaan Malaysia, abbreviated as UKM) is a public research university located in Bandar Baru Bangi, Hulu Langat District, Selangor, Malaysia. Its teaching hospital, Universiti Kebangsaan Malaysia Medical Centre (UKMMC), is located in Cheras and also has a branch campus in Kuala Lumpur. The university also has an overseas branch campus in Lusail City, Doha since 2023.

In 2023, there were 46,241 students enrolled at the university. 23,621 were undergraduates, while 15,553 were postgraduates, of which 9,410 were pursuing for Master's degree and the remaining 6,143 were PhD students. In addition to that, there were also 551 Asasi Pintar students and 6,516 postgraduate diploma students.

Among the students, 7,625 of them are international students from 69 countries, of which 48% are postgraduate while 52% are undergraduate. The majority of UKM's international students are from China, and then followed by Indonesia, Iraq, Bangladesh and Saudi Arabia.

UKM was founded in 1970 explicitly as an institute of higher education that uses the Malay language as its main medium of instruction compared to other existing universities in Malaysia primarily using English at the time. From 1970 until 2023, UKM had produced a total of 229,452 alumni.

== History ==
=== Proposal ===
In 1968, calls for the establishment of a national university emerged from various sectors, including political parties such as UMNO, PRM, DAP, and PAS. Several state governments, including Pahang, Sabah and Malacca, expressed support by offering land or financial assistance. Non-government organisations, student groups, and teachers unions like Sabah Government's Teachers Union (KGKS) and Angkatan Gaya Baru Sabah also voiced their support for the establishment of UKM.

On 25 August 1968, a Working Committee chaired by Syed Nasir Ismail, a Malay intellectual and director of Dewan Bahasa dan Pustaka, was set up to prepare a report recommended the establishment of UKM. Other prominent members of this committee include Tun Dr. Mahathir Mohamad, who would become Malaysia's fourth prime minister, and Dr. Mohd Rashdan Haji Baba, who later became UKM's first Vice-Chancellor.

On 7 September 1968, the then-Education Minister Mohamed Khir Johari officially announced the government will establish a national university, which would use the Malay language as the main medium of instruction, but English and Arabic would still be used in certain subjects. The university would also be open to all regardless of race and it was expected to open in 1970.

=== Opening ===
On 18 May 1970, Universiti Kebangsaan Malaysia opened its doors to 192 undergraduate students in Jalan Pantai Baru, Kuala Lumpur, a temporary campus (Note: The campus buildings in Lembah Pantai are now occupied by Institute of Teacher Education, International Languages Campus.) housing three main faculties, the Faculties of Science, Arts and Islamic Studies. On 18 January 1972, the then-prime minister Tun Abdul Razak Hussein, after obtaining agreement from the working committee, decided to build the permanent campus of UKM on a 930 ha (2,300 acres) site in the town of Bangi, near Kajang.

In October 1977, UKM moved to its present premises which form the main campus in Bangi. The campus has a size of 1,096 ha (2,710 acres). UKM has two health campuses, the Kuala Lumpur campus in Jalan Raja Muda Abdul Aziz, and the UKM Medical Centre in Cheras. The Kuala Lumpur campus consists of the Faculties of Health Sciences, Pharmacy, Dentistry and the Pre-Clinical Departments of the Medical Faculty. With a size of 20 ha (49 acres), the Kuala Lumpur campus was established in 1974.

The campus in Cheras consists of the Medical Faculty, the UKM Teaching Hospital (Hospital Canselor Tuanku Muhriz UKM (HCTM)) and the UKM Medical Molecular Biology Institute (UMBI). The Cheras campus was opened in 1997. Besides these campuses, UKM operates seven research stations (RS): The Tasik Chini RS, The Marine Ecosystem RS, The Langkawi Geopark RS, The Marine RS, The Fraser's Hill RS, The Plant Biotechnology RS and in the main campus itself, the UKM Campus Living Laboratory, which comprises the UKM Permanent Forest Reserve, or its Malay name, Hutan Simpan Kekal UKM as well as the Fernarium and the Herbarium.

In 2006, UKM won the Prime Minister's Quality Award and achieved the status of a Malaysian Research University.

In 2023, UKM established its first overseas branch campus in Lusail City, Qatar. The branch campus was established with the collaboration of The Regional Group of Qatar, who provided the facilities, infrastructure, equipments and materials for the campus. The agreement to set up the Qatar campus was signed on 19 May 2022 and the campus was opened by Prime Minister Anwar Ibhrahim on 14 May 2024.

== Coat of arms ==
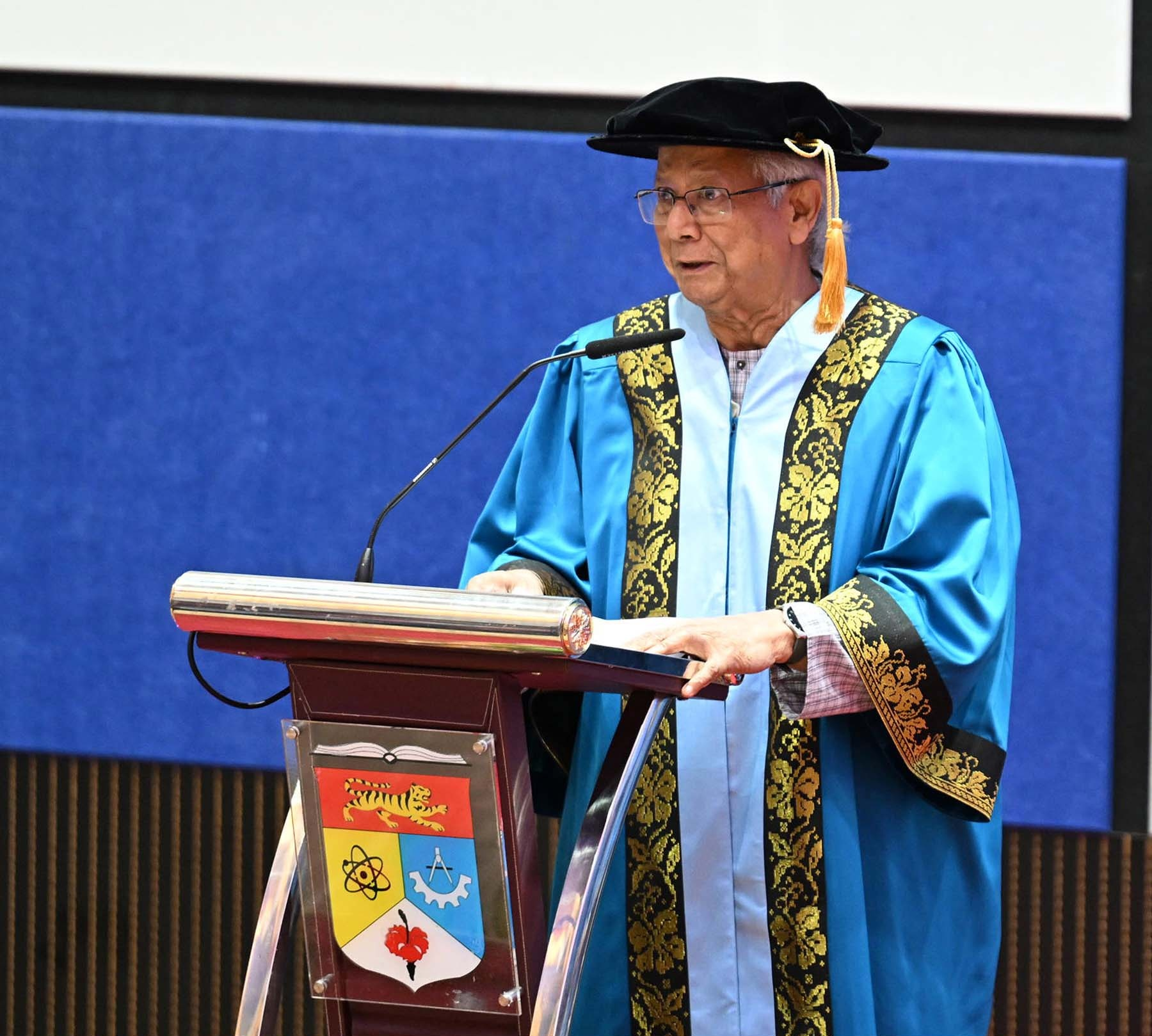
2006 Nobel Peace laureate Muhammad Yunus delivering a speech at the 2025 special convocation.

The current coat of arms of the UKM was first designed by university staffer Mohd Aris Atan and has been in use since 1972. It was modified to its present form by publications officer Zulkifli Ibrahim, which was launched on 29 July 2000 in conjunction with the university's 30th anniversary, with stripes added to the tiger's body. The arms is depicted as a quartered shield featuring an atomic symbol, a compass, a gear, a Malayan tiger and the national flower, Bunga Raya, or hibiscus rosa-sinensis, with an open book placed on the top. The atomic symbol represents science, the compasses and gear represent technology, the tiger represents strength and courage and the book represents knowledge. It is blazoned:

- Shield: Tierced per pall reversed, the dexter Or a conventional representation of an atom Sable, the sinister Azure a pair of Compasses erect and extended between a demi cogwheel Argent, the base Argent a Bunga Raya or hibiscus flower proper, a chief Gules thereon a tiger passant to the sinister also proper.
- Crest: An open book proper.

The first coat of arms of the university designed by the First Dean of the Faculty of Arts, Syed Muhammad Naquib al-Attas, was different from the present one. It was blazoned as:

Tierced per pall reversed, the dexter Gules on a bend Azure fimbriated Argent a crescent and a fourteen-pointed federal star Or, the sinister Vert a tiger holding in its dexter paw a torch enflamed and in its sinister paw a kris proper and the base Or a Bunga Raya (hibiscus flower) also proper.

The crest featured a scroll inscribed with the words 'Zidni Ilman', which means increase me in knowledge, a reference to Surah 20 Taha, Verse 114 of the Quran.

In 2010, the university's corporate logo was created by its Centre for Corporate Communications, featuring the coat of arms accompanied by the names of the university in Malay and English. The Malay name is presented as UNIVERSITI KEBANGSAAN MALAYSIA, with the letters U, K and M bigger than the rest. Below, the English name (The National University of Malaysia) is smaller and italicised.

The National University of Malaysia is currently one of the three public universities in Malaysia to adopt its coat of arms, the other two are the University of Malaya and Universiti Sains Malaysia.

== List of vice-chancellors ==
The following is a list of vice-chancellors of the National University of Malaysia.

#	Vice-Chancellor	Term start	Term end
1	Mohd Rashdan Baba	1970	1971
2	Ariffin Ngah Marzuki	1971	1974
3	Mohd Ghazali Abdul Rahman	1974	1975
4	Anuwar Mahmud	1975	1980
5	Awang Had Salleh	1980	1984
6	Abdul Hamid Abdul Rahman	1984	1993
7	Mohd Sham Mohd Sani	1993	1998
8	Anuwar Ali	1998	2003
9	Mohd Salleh Mohd Yasin	2003	2006
10	Sharifah Hapsah Syed Hasan Shahabudin	2006	2014
11	Noor Azlan Ghazali	2014	2018
12	Mohd Hamdi Abdul Shukor	2019	2020
13	Mohd Ekhwan Toriman	2021	2025
14	Prof. Dr. Sufian Jusoh	2025	present

== Faculties, Schools and Institutes ==
As of November 2024, there are a total of 12 faculties, 2 schools and 12 research institutes in UKM offering various undergraduate and postgraduate programmes. Majority of them are located in the main UKM campus in Bangi.

== Notable alumni ==
- Anwar Ibrahim, 10th Prime Minister of Malaysia
- Mohd Rashid Hasnon, former Deputy Speaker of Dewan Rakyat and former Deputy Chief Minister I of Penang
- Ahmad Samsuri Mokhtar, 15th Menteri Besar of Terengganu
- Sheikh Muszaphar Shukor, Malaysia's first astronaut
- Syed Hussein Alatas, Malaysian academician, sociologist and politician
- Anthony Loke Siew Fook, Minister of Transport of Malaysia
- Liow Tiong Lai, former Minister of Transport of Malaysia
- Noor Hisham Abdullah, former Director-General of Health of Malaysia
- Jemilah Mahmood, Chief of the Humanitarian Response Branch, United Nations Populations Fund (UNFPA) in New York
- Ayob Khan Mydin Pitchay, 27th Deputy Inspector-General of Royal Malaysian Police
- Anwar Fazal, Father of Malaysian NGO Movement – Honorary Doctorate in Law, 1997
- Razali Ibrahim, former Deputy Minister in the Prime Minister's Department
- Chong Sin Woon, Malaysian politician and Secretary-General of Malaysian Chinese Association
- Ramlan Bin Ibrahim, diplomat, Permanent Representative of Malaysia to the United Nations
- Ayman Rashdan Wong, writer
- Adibah Noor, singer
- Jess Lee, singer
- Mohamad Fuzi Harun, 11th Inspector-General of Royal Malaysian Police
- Mohammad Tashim, 4th Deputy Minister of Religious Affairs of Brunei
- Nenney Shushaidah Binti Shamsuddin, one of the two female Syariah High Court Judges in Malaysia
- Abdul Hamid Bador, 12th Inspector-General of Royal Malaysian Police Police
- Mohd Zuki Ali, 15th Chief Secretary to the Government of Malaysia
- Hasrin Sabtu, former Commissioner of Royal Brunei Police Force
- Alirupendi, former Joint Force Commander of the Royal Brunei Armed Forces
- Raed Qaddoura, Palestinian academic and writer.
- Zaini Ahmad, Bruneian politician and rebel during the 1962 Brunei revolt
- Yusoff Ismail, Bruneian politician and diplomat
- Razarudin Husain, 14th Inspector-General of Royal Malaysian Police

== Cricket ground ==
YSD-UKM Cricket Oval
- Interactive map of YSD-UKM Cricket Oval

Ground information
- Location: Bangi, Malaysia
- Country: Malaysia
- Establishment: 2
- Capacity: n/a
- Owner: Malaysian Cricket Association
- Operator: n/a
- Tenants: Malaysia cricket team Malaysia women's national cricket team Article Talk

International information
- First men's T20I: 2 July 2022: Malaysia v Bhutan
- Last men's T20I: 9 September 2024: Hong Kong v Kuwait
- First women's T20I: 12 August 2018: Malaysia v Singapore
- Last women's T20I: 14 February 2024: Kuwait v Nepal
- As of 9 September 2024; Source: Cricinfo

== Rankings ==
Year	Rank	Valuer
2005	185	Times Higher Education World University Rankings – QS World University Rankings
2006	185	Times Higher Education World University Rankings – QS World University Rankings
2007	309	Times Higher Education World University Rankings – QS World University Rankings
2008	250	Times Higher Education World University Rankings – QS World University Rankings
2009	291	Times Higher Education World University Rankings – QS World University Rankings
2010	263	QS World University Rankings
2011	279	QS World University Rankings
2012	261	QS World University Rankings
2012	N/A (did not submit data)	Times Higher Education World University Rankings
2014	=269	QS World University Rankings
2015	=259	QS World University Rankings
2016	=312	QS World University Rankings
2017	=302	QS World University Rankings
2018	=230	QS World University Rankings
2019	=184	QS World University Rankings
2020	=160	QS World University Rankings

When the Times Higher Education (THE) Guide University Rankings was published in October 2014, it was reported that UKM, along with Universiti Malaya, opted not to submit data for consideration. The UKM Strategic Centre deputy executive director Associate, Professor Dr. Masturah Markom, responded by saying that the rankings were unfair to the Malaysian educational context. She specifically cited the measurement of "industry income" in the THE methodology of university assessment, stating that Malaysian industry input cannot compete with other countries such as the United States of America. This is despite the fact that only a 2.5% weightage is allocated to "industry income" in the methodology, with more conventional categories such as teaching and research still making up 90%.

== Controversies ==
=== 2022 Convocation dress code ===
On 30 October 2022, an infographic poster published by the university and outlining the dress code for the upcoming 2022 convocation draws ire and went viral on social media. The poster in question shown examples of what attire is acceptable and unacceptable to be worn during the ceremony for both male and female graduates.

However, cheongsam and saree, both being the traditional dresses for Chinese and Indian women respectively, were listed as "inappropriate" and prohibited alongside short-sleeved blouse and knee-length skirt. This immediately sparked online accusations of racial discrimination or racial bias against the university. The poster hosted on the university's website was then deleted on the same day.

A day later on 31 October 2022, UKM uploaded a revised version of its latest dress code guideline for the upcoming convocation. The new guidelines said graduands and guests attending the convocation ceremony will be allowed to wear baju kebangsaan (national attire), but it did not specify which national attire is allowed, only explicitly stating all items of clothing worn must be dark-coloured, fully sleeved and extend to one's ankle.

=== Fahmi Reza ===
==== UKM frog logo ====
On 5 April 2021, Fahmi Reza, who is a political satirical artist and activist, uploaded an artwork resembling the coat of arms of UKM with the accompanying text "Universiti Katak Kebangsaan" (National Frog University), on his social media. The artwork was supposed to symbolise Communications Minister Saifuddin Abdullah's reputation for political party hopping. Fahmi later claimed that "It is just a satirical, fictitious logo for a fictitious [frog] university that gave out that fictitious master's degree" and has "nothing to do with UKM".

Due to the resemblance of the artwork to UKM's coat of arms, Fahmi Reza was hit with a letter of demand by UKM on 7 April 2021, claiming such artwork is an insult against the university and demanded him to delete the artwork from his social media within 7 days, failing which will result in legal action taken against him. However, Fahmi said he refuse to comply with such demand. Fahmi was also investigated and has his statement recorded by the Kajang police over the artwork.

==== 'Kelas Demokrasi' shut down ====
In the month preceding the 15th General Election held on 19 November 2022, Fahmi Reza went on a tour at numerous universities around the country and held a forum titled "Kelas Demokrasi" (Democracy Class) with the aim to increase political literacy among the universities' youths. However, his Kelas Demokrasi forum held at the UKM Bangi campus on 10 November 2022, with over 200 students attending, was shut down by the university's auxiliary police and security 10 minutes after it was started. UKM's security shut down the sound system and told the crowd to disperse. UKM's management said such event requires permission for it to be held on campus. The forum was later relocated to C&P Coffee Company in Bandar Baru Bangi, which is located outside the campus.

=== Mohd Ekhwan Toriman's resignation ===
On 3 February 2025, Mohd Ekhwan Toriman, the Vice-Chancellor of UKM since 2021 announced his resignation, effective 2 February 2025. Mohd Ekhwan in his resignation message also said "Thank you for all the slander and accusations that have been thrown in my way, for which police reports and reports to the Malaysian Communications and Multimedia Commission (MCMC) have already been made". The police later confirmed they have received police reports from Mohd Ekhwan and two top management personnel of the university, and is investigating the case as a defamation case.

His resignation came amidst allegations that an audit has revealed his involvement in abuse of power, manipulation in the tender process and misappropriation of funds of the university. A Malay online tabloid alleged that Negeri Sembilan's ruler and Chancellor of UKM, Tuanku Muhriz, was "angered" by the revelations and did not invite UKM's top management to his birthday celebration and titles awarding ceremony on 14 January of the same year.

On 12 February 2025, Yang di-Pertuan Besar of Negeri Sembilan Tuanku Muhriz ordered the revocation of Mohd Ekhwan's title Darjah Setia Bakti Negeri Sembilan (DBNS) with immediate effect. The Negeri Sembilan palace said this was done to "uphold the dignity and honour of the Royal Institution in Negeri Sembilan".

== See also ==
- UKM Medical Centre
- UKM Medical Molecular Biology Institute (UMBI)
- PATMA Library
- UKM Bangi Stadium
