= Mohd Najib Abdul Aziz =

Former Deputy Inspector-General of Police

Yang Berbahagia Tan Sri Dato' Mohd Najib Abdul Aziz PGPP PSM DPMS DSPN PSPP JMN JSM PMP

Deputy Inspector-General of Police (Malaysia)
- In office 11 September 2006 – 12 November 2007
- Preceded by: Musa Hassan
- Succeeded by: Ismail Omar

Personal details
- Born: 13 November 1950 (age 75) Sabak Bernam, Selangor, Federation of Malaya

Mohd Najib bin Abdul Aziz (born 13 November 1950) was a former senior malaysian police officer who served as Deputy Inspector-General of Police from 11 September 2006 to 12 November 2007.

== Early life ==
Mohd Najib Abdul Aziz was born on 13 November 1950 in Sabak Bernam, Selangor.

== Police career ==
Mohd Najib Abdul Aziz joined the Police Force on 11 November 1972 as an Inspector. After completing basic police training, he was placed as a Vice/Gambling Officer of Criminal Investigation Department in Penang for 6 months.

During his service in the Royal Malaysia Police, he held positions such as Manjung District Police Chief, Perak, Deputy Director of Bukit Aman Narcotics Criminal Investigation Department, Kelantan Police Chief, Director of Bukit Aman Narcotics Criminal Investigation Department from 2004 to 2006.

On 11 September 2006, he was appointed as Deputy Inspector-General of Police.

== Post career ==
Mohd Najib Abdul Aziz is a member of the Board of Trustees for Yayasan Pengaman Malaysia.

== Honours ==
- Malaysia
  - Companion of the Order of Loyalty to the Crown of Malaysia (JSM) (1999)
  - Companion of the Order of the Defender of the Realm (JMN) (2006)
  - Commander of the Order of Loyalty to the Crown of Malaysia (PSM) – Tan Sri (2007)
- Royal Malaysia Police
  - Loyal Commander of the Most Gallant Police Order (PSPP) (2005)
  - Courageous Commander of the Most Gallant Police Order (PGPP)
- Perak
  - Commander of the Order of the Perak State Crown (PMP) (1994)
- Penang
  - Officer of the Order of the Defender of State (DSPN) – Dato' (2002)
- Selangor
  - Knight Commander of the Order of the Crown of Selangor (DPMS) – Dato' (2007)
