= Jamil Osman =

Yang Berbahagia Dato' Wira Jamil Osman DGMK DPMK DIMP
- جميل بن عثمان
- Born: 5 March 1950 (age 76); Kepala Batas, Kedah
- Citizenship: Malaysia,
- Education: University of Nottingham
- Occupation: Academician
- Known for: Rector of Insaniah
- Spouse: Zuraidah Binti Ahmad Murad
- Children: 4
- Website: www.insaniah.edu.my

Jamil bin Osman (Jawi: جميل بن عثمان; born 5 March 1950) is a Malaysian scholar, professor of Islamic Economics, pioneer of Islamic banking and finance in Malaysia, Rector and CEO of Insaniah University College. Prior to working at Insaniah, he served as Dean of Admissions and Records Division (1989-1999) and Deputy Rector Academic Affairs (1999-2003) at International Islamic University Malaysia.

== Biography ==
He was born in 1950 in Kepala Batas, Kedah. Young Jamil received his early education at Sekolah Kebangsaan Kepala Batas, and Sekolah Kebangsaan Padang Garong, Kota Baharu, Kelantan. In 1962 he was named as the overall best student in the state of Kelantan. In 1969 he joined Institut Teknologi Mara (ITM) where he pursued a four-year program in statistics. In 1985 he received a diploma in Islamic studies from Universiti Kebangsaan Malaysia.

Osman obtained his PhD in Economics and Finance from Rensselaer Polytechnic Institute (RPI), New York (1988), MSc in econometrics from Western Michigan University, Kalamazoo (1981) and Undergraduate degree in statistics from Central London Polytechnic (now University of Westminster) and was a lecturer in a University of Nottingham. He is married to Datin Zuraidah Binti Ahmad Murad and has four children.

== Career ==
- Research Officer of MARDI, Serdang, Malaysia
- Lecturer, Institute Technology of MARA, Malaysia
- Founding member of KENMS, IIUM
- Deputy Dean of Economic Kulliyyah, IIUM
- Head of Economics Department, IIUM
- Dean of Admissions and Records, IIUM
- Deputy Rector (Academics), International Islamic University, Malaysia (IIUM)
- Representative of East and South East Asia (Director), IIIT
- Honorary Senior Fellow, IIUM
- Technical Adviser, Universal Crescent standard center (UCSC)
- President of Malaysian Institute of Statistics

== Honours ==
- Kedah
  - Knight Commander of the Glorious Order of the Crown of Kedah (DGMK) – Dato' Wira (2011)
  - Knight Commander of the Order of the Crown of Kedah (DPMK) – Dato' (2005)
- Pahang
  - Knight Companion of the Order of the Crown of Pahang (DIMP) – Dato' (1998)

=== Awards ===
- Professor Emeritus from International Islamic University Malaysia in 2016.
- International Gold Medal Award Islamic Countries Society of Statistical Sciences in Doha, Qatar (2012)
