= Mazlan Mansor =

Malaysian police officer (born 1960)

Yang Berbahagia Tan Sri Dato' Setia Mazlan Mansor PSM SSIS DPMS DIMP DMSM DPTS PGPP PCM PSPP PPA PJPN
- مصلان بن منصور

25th Deputy Inspector-General of Police (Malaysia)
- In office 9 May 2019 – 14 August 2020
- Nominated by: Mahathir Mohamad
- Appointed by: Abdullah
- Monarch: Abdullah
- Prime Minister: Mahathir Mohamad (2019–2020); Muhyiddin Yassin (2020)
- Minister: Muhyiddin Yassin (2019–2020); Hamzah Zainudin (2020)
- Inspector-General: Abdul Hamid Bador
- Preceded by: Abdul Hamid Bador (Acting)
- Succeeded by: Acryl Sani Abdullah Sani

Personal details
- Born: Mazlan bin Mansor; 14 August 1960 (age 66) Bukit Mertajam, Central Seberang Perai District, Penang, Federation of Malaya (now Malaysia)
- Citizenship: Malaysian
- Relations: Tan Sri Mansor Mohd Noor (father)
- Education: Aberystwyth University
- Occupation: Police officer
- Profession: Lawyer

Mazlan bin Mansor (Jawi: مصلان بن منصور; born 14 August 1960) is a retired Malaysian police officer who served as the Deputy Inspector-General of Police of Malaysia (DIG) under Inspector-General (IGP) Abdul Hamid Bador from May 2019 to his retirement in August 2020. He was the director of the Commercial Crimes Investigation Department (CCID) of the Royal Malaysia Police (PDRM) and had stints as police chief for various states ranging from Malacca, Negeri Sembilan and Selangor to the police commissioner of Sarawak.

== Education ==
Mazlan is a graduate from Aberystwyth University with a Bachelor of Law (LL.B.) and holds a Malaysian Certificate in Legal Practice (CLP) which enables him to practice as a lawyer in Malaysia.

== Career ==
Beginning August 2013, Mazlan served as deputy director of PDRM's Criminal Investigation Department (CID) in-charge of intelligence and operations.

In May 2016, Mazlan was transferred to the Malaysian Borneo state of Sarawak as its new police commissioner, taking over from Muhammad Sabtu Osman who returned as director of PDRM's Internal Security and Public Order Department (ISPOD). After slightly more than a year as Sarawak police commissioner, Mazlan was then appointed as Selangor police chief effective 7 July 2017 to replace Abdul Samah Mat who was about to retire.

Effective 11 February 2019, Mazlan was appointed to head PDRM's CCID as its director, taking over from acting director Saiful Azly Kamaruddin who was temporarily filling in for the retired Amar Singh Ishar Singh. He continued heading the Selangor police contingent for a brief period before his successor, Noor Azam Jamaludin, took over. Mazlan was elevated as DIG effective 9 May 2019 following the retirement of Noor Rashid Ibrahim, with acting DIG Abdul Hamid Bador assuming the post of IGP.

Mazlan went on mandatory retirement from the PDRM effective 14 August 2020, ending a 41-year career in the police force.

== Honours ==
- Malaysia
  - Commander of the Order of Loyalty to the Crown of Malaysia (PSM) – Tan Sri (2020)
  - Recipient of the General Service Medal (PPA)
  - Recipient of the 16th Yang di-Pertuan Agong Installation Medal
- Royal Malaysia Police
  - Courageous Commander of the Most Gallant Police Order (PGPP) (2020)
  - Loyal Commander of the Most Gallant Police Order (PSPP) (2011)
  - Recipient of the National Hero Service Medal (PJPN)
  - Recipient of the Presentation of Police Colours Medal
- Malacca
  - Companion Class I of the Exalted Order of Malacca (DMSM) – Datuk (2008)
- Pahang
  - Knight Companion of the Order of the Crown of Pahang (DIMP) – Dato' (2008)
- Perak
  - Knight Commander of the Order of Taming Sari (DPTS) – Dato' Pahlawan (2017)
  - Commander of the Order of Cura Si Manja Kini (PCM) (2007)
- Selangor
  - Knight Grand Companion of the Order of Sultan Sharafuddin Idris Shah (SSIS) – Dato' Setia (2025)
  - Knight Commander of the Order of the Crown of Selangor (DPMS) – Dato' (2018)
  - Recipient of the Sultan Salahuddin Silver Jubilee Medal
  - Recipient of the Sultan Sharafuddin Silver Jubilee Medal
