= Razarudin Husain =

Malaysian police officer

Yang Berbahagia Tan Sri Razarudin Husain PMN PSM SPMS SPMP SSAP SSMZ SPDK SPTS SPJK DGSM SSNS DIMP PGDK DPTS PGPP PSPP PPP ADK PPA PKN PJPN DUBC
- رضارالدين حسين

14th Inspector-General of Police (Malaysia)
- In office 23 June 2023 – 22 June 2025
- Monarchs: Abdullah (2023–2024); Ibrahim Iskandar (since 2024)
- Prime Minister: Anwar Ibrahim
- Minister: Saifuddin Nasution Ismail
- Deputy: Ayob Khan Mydin Pitchay
- Preceded by: Acryl Sani Abdullah Sani
- Succeeded by: Mohd Khalid Ismail

28th Deputy Inspector-General of Police (Malaysia)
- In office 26 December 2021 – 22 June 2023
- Monarch: Abdullah
- Prime Minister: Ismail Sabri Yaakob (2021–2022); Anwar Ibrahim (2022–2023)
- Minister: Hamzah Zainudin (2020–2021); Saifuddin Nasution Ismail (2022–2023)
- Inspector-General: Acryl Sani Abdullah Sani
- Preceded by: Mazlan Lazim
- Succeeded by: Ayob Khan Mydin Pitchay

Personal details
- Born: 15 March 1963 (age 63) Dengkil, Selangor, Federation of Malaya (now Malaysia)
- Citizenship: Malaysian
- Spouse: Zainah Othman
- Education: National University of Malaysia (B.Soc.Sc)
- Occupation: Police officer

Razarudin bin Husain (Jawi: رضارالدين ابن حسين; born 15 March 1963) is a Malaysian police officer who served as the 14th Inspector-General of Police (IGP) from June 2023 to June 2025. Previously, he was the Deputy Inspector-General of Police (DIG) from December 2021 to his promotion to the IGP in June 2023.

== Early life ==
Razarudin bin Husain was born on 15 March 1963 in Dengkil, Selangor. He holds a Master's Degree in Social Science in Policing Studies from Universiti Kebangsaan Malaysia (UKM).

== Police career ==
Razarudin joined the police force on 27 December 1982 as Probationary Inspector at the age of 19. He had served as Deputy Commander of Special Task Force On Organised Crime (STAFOC) in 2013. On 29 April 2016, Razarudin promoted to Senior Assistant Commissioner of Police and assumed the post of Head of the Penang Criminal Investigation Department, replacing Zakaria Ahmad who went on become Johor Deputy Police Chief. In the same year, He promoted to Deputy Commissioner of Police and served as Sabah Deputy Police Commissioner, his previous post was taken by Zainol Samah. In 2018, Razarudin assumed the post of Perak Deputy Police Chief and in 2019 he served as Perak Police Chief.

=== Director of Bukit Aman Narcotics Crime Investigation Department ===
On 9 September 2020, he served as Director of Bukit Aman Narcotics Crime Investigation Department.

=== Deputy Inspector-General of Police (2021–2023) ===
On 22 December 2021, he was appointed Deputy Inspector-General of Police, replacing Mazlan Lazim who later retired on 25 December 2021.

=== Inspector-General of Police (2023–2025) ===
On 23 June 2023, he was promoted to the Inspector-General of Police, replacing Acryl Sani Abdullah Sani who retired on 22 June 2023.

== Honours ==
=== Honours of Malaysia ===
- Malaysia
  - Commander of the Order of the Defender of the Realm (PMN) – Tan Sri (2024)
  - Commander of the Order of Loyalty to the Crown of Malaysia (PSM) – Tan Sri (2022)
  - Recipient of the General Service Medal (PPA)
  - Recipient of the National Sovereignty Medal (PKN)
  - Recipient of the 15th Yang di-Pertuan Agong Installation Medal
  - Recipient of the 16th Yang di-Pertuan Agong Installation Medal
  - Recipient of the 17th Yang di-Pertuan Agong Installation Medal
- Royal Malaysia Police
  - Courageous Commander of the Most Gallant Police Order (PGPP) (2021)
  - Loyal Commander of the Most Gallant Police Order (PSPP) (2012)
  - Warrior of the Most Gallant Police Order (PPP)
  - Recipient of the National Hero Service Medal (PJPN)
  - Recipient of the Presentation of Police Colours Medal
- Johor
  - Recipient of Sultan Ibrahim Ismail Coronation Medal - Second Class of Silver
- Kelantan
  - Knight Grand Commander of the Order of the Services to the Crown of Kelantan (SPJK) – Dato' (2024)
- Malacca
  - Grand Commander of the Exalted Order of Malacca (DGSM) – Datuk Seri (2023)
- Negeri Sembilan
  - Knight Grand Companion of the Order of Loyalty to Negeri Sembilan (SSNS) – Dato' Seri (2024)
- Pahang
  - Knight Grand Companion of the Order of Sultan Ahmad Shah of Pahang (SSAP) – Dato' Sri (2022)
  - Knight Companion of the Order of the Crown of Pahang (DIMP) – Dato' (2013)
- Perak
  - Knight Grand Commander of the Order of Taming Sari (SPTS) – Dato' Seri Panglima (2022)
  - Knight Commander of the Order of Taming Sari (DPTS) – Dato' Pahlawan (2020)
- Perlis
  - Knight Grand Commander of the Order of the Crown of Perlis (SPMP) – Dato' Seri (2026)
  - Recipient of Tuanku Syed Sirajuddin Jamalullail Silver Jubilee Medal (2025)
- Sabah
  - Grand Commander of the Order of Kinabalu (SPDK) – Datuk Seri Panglima (2024)
  - Commander of the Order of Kinabalu (PGDK) – Datuk (2021)
  - Member of the Order of Kinabalu (ADK) (2008)
- Selangor
  - Knight Grand Commander of the Order of the Crown of Selangor (SPMS) – Dato' Seri (2023)
- Terengganu
  - Knight Grand Companion of the Order of Sultan Mizan Zainal Abidin of Terengganu (SSMZ) – Dato' Seri (2024)

=== Foreign honours ===
- Singapore
  - Recipient of the Darjah Utama Bakti Cemerlang (DUBC) (2025)
