= City University Malaysia =

University in Selangor, Malaysia

Coordinates: 3°06′08.2″N 101°38′15.5″E

- Logo of City University Malaysia
- Former names: City University College of Science and Technology
- Type: Private university
- Established: 1984
- Chairman: Mohd Sham Mohd Sani
- Vice-Chancellor: Prof. Dr. Rosnizah Bt Shaari
- Students: 7,500
- Location: Menara City U, No. 8, Jalan 51A/223, 46100, Petaling Jaya, Selangor, Malaysia
- Website: city.edu.my

City University Malaysia is a private university in Petaling Jaya, Selangor, Malaysia.

Established in April 1984, City University Malaysia was founded by a group of scholars. Originally known as Petaling Jaya Community College. the university attained full university status in 2016.

The university, alongside City University Press, are subsidiaries of U.C.I. Education Sdn. Bhd. City University Press publishes the CUeJAR, an e-journal. As a research university, the university offers five doctoral programs in the fields of business (PhD & DBA), information technology (PhD), design (PhD), and education (PhD & EdD).

City University Malaysia has four campuses across Malaysia, located in Petaling Jaya, Cyberjaya, Johor Bahru, and Kota Kinabalu.

The university has international students constituting over 47% of the student population, drawn from over 70 nations.

Under a Sino-Malaysian bilateral agreement in 2009, City University Malaysia degree programmes are acknowledged by the Chinese Ministry of Education.
