= Mohd Sham Mohd Sani =

Malaysian academic

- Known for: Former vice chancellor of National University of Malaysia
- Title: Chairman of City University, Malaysia

Mohd Sham Mohd Sani is a Malaysian academic who had served as the former Vice Chancellor of National University of Malaysia. He was the first in National University of Malaysia's history to be awarded the Emeritus Professor status. He is the Chairman of City University, Malaysia. In 2015, he was appointed along with 13 people as members of the Negotiation and Corruption Prevention Panel by the Malaysian Anti-Corruption Commission.
