= Deputy Inspector-General of Police (Malaysia) =

Rank in the Royal Malaysian Police

Deputy Inspector-General of Royal Malaysia Police
- Incumbent; Abdul Aziz Abdul Majid since 9 September 2026
- Royal Malaysia Police
- Style: Yang Berbahagia
- Type: Deputy inspector general of police
- Abbreviation: DIG
- Reports to: Minister of Home Affairs
- Seat: Jalan Bukit Aman, Tasik Perdana, 50560 Kuala Lumpur, Wilayah Persekutuan Kuala Lumpur, Malaysia
- Appointer: Yang di-Pertuan Agong
- Term length: Age of mandatory requirement at 60
- Constituting instrument: Police (Malaysia) Act 1967
- Formation: 1958

The Deputy Inspector-General of Police (abbreviation: DIG) is the second most senior police rank of a senior officer in the Royal Malaysian Police (PDRM) above the rank of Commissioner of Police (CP) and below that of the Inspector-General of Police (IGP).

== Appointment ==
According to the Federal Constitution, the Yang di-Pertuan Agong shall first appoint a deputy inspector-general of police to preside over the police force according to Article 140 (4)(5) with the consent of His Majesty the Yang di-Pertuan Agong with the Prime Minister's advice on the Police Force Commission's certificate. This person must be a Malaysian citizen.

== Coat of Arms and Clothing ==
The DIGP's shirt is dark blue same as other police officers, with a crown, a double keris and four stars as shoulder insignia. The collar badge has a leaf pattern. The police cap has white double rice ears decoration.

== List of Deputy Inspectors-General of Police ==
Since 1958, a total of 31 Deputy Inspectors-General of Police have been appointed. The list is as follows:

No.	Portrait	Deputy Inspector-General	Took office	Left office	Time in office
1.		Claude Fenner	2 June 1958	17 September 1958	108 days
2.		Unknown			
3.		Unknown			
4.		Abdul Rahman Hashim	31 January 1972	31 January 1973	1 year, 1 day
5.		Mohammed Hanif Omar	11 February 1973	7 June 1974	1 year, 127 days
6.		Unknown			
7.		Unknown			
8.		Mohd Amin Osman	January 1979	December 1985	6 years
9.		Abdul Kudus Alias	Unknown		
10.		Abdul Rahim Mohd Noor	14 June 1989	15 January 1994	4 years, 216 days
11.		Tan Sri; Samsuri Arshad (b.1942)	16 January 1994	5 May 1997	3 years, 110 days
12.		Tan Sri; Norian Mai (b.1946)	6 May 1997	7 January 1999	1 year, 247 days
13.		Tan Sri; Mohd Jamil Johari (b.1947)	8 January 1999	12 May 2002	3 years, 125 days
14.		Tan Sri; Mohd Bakri Omar (b.1948–2014)	13 May 2002	5 November 2003	1 year, 177 days
15.		Tan Sri; Mohd Sedek Mohd Ali (1949–2010)	13 January 2004	3 January 2005	357 days
16.		Tan Sri; Musa Hassan (b.1951)	4 January 2005	10 September 2006	1 year, 250 days
17.		Tan Sri; Mohd Najib Abdul Aziz (b.1950)	11 September 2006	12 November 2007	1 year, 63 days
18.		Tan Sri; Ismail Omar (b.1953)	12 November 2007	12 September 2010	2 years, 304 days
19.		Dato' Sri; Hussin Ismail (b.1953)	13 September 2010	14 April 2011	214 days
20.		Tan Sri; Khalid Abu Bakar (b.1957)	15 April 2011	16 May 2013	2 years, 32 days
21.		Tan Sri; Mohd Bakri Mohd Zinin (b.1954)	17 May 2013	6 September 2014	1 year, 113 days
22.		Mohamad Fuzi Harun (Acting)	7 September 2014	2 December 2014	87 days
23.		Tan Sri; Noor Rashid Ibrahim (b.1958)	3 December 2014	14 March 2019	4 years, 102 days
24.		Abdul Hamid Bador (Acting)	15 March 2019	3 May 2019	50 days
25.		Tan Sri; Mazlan Mansor (b.1960)	9 May 2019	13 August 2020	1 year, 97 days
26.		Dato' Sri; Acryl Sani Abdullah Sani (b.1961)	14 August 2020	3 May 2021	263 days
27.		Datuk Seri; Mazlan Lazim (b.1961)	25 June 2021	25 December 2021	184 days
28.		Tan Sri; Razarudin Husain (b.1963)	26 December 2021	22 June 2023	1 year, 179 days
29.		Tan Sri; Ayob Khan Mydin Pitchay (b.1966)	23 June 2023	27 July 2026	3 years, 35 days
30.		Dato' Sri; Ibrahim Darus (b.1966) (Acting)	27 July 2026	9 September 2026	78 days
31.		Datuk Seri; Abdul Aziz Abdul Majid (b.1967)	9 September 2026	Incumbent	33 days
