= Mohd Jamil Johari =

Former Deputy Inspector-General of Police

Yang Berbahagia Tan Sri Dato Sri Mohd Jamil Johari PGPP PSM PNBS PGDK DSAP JMN KMN PPC
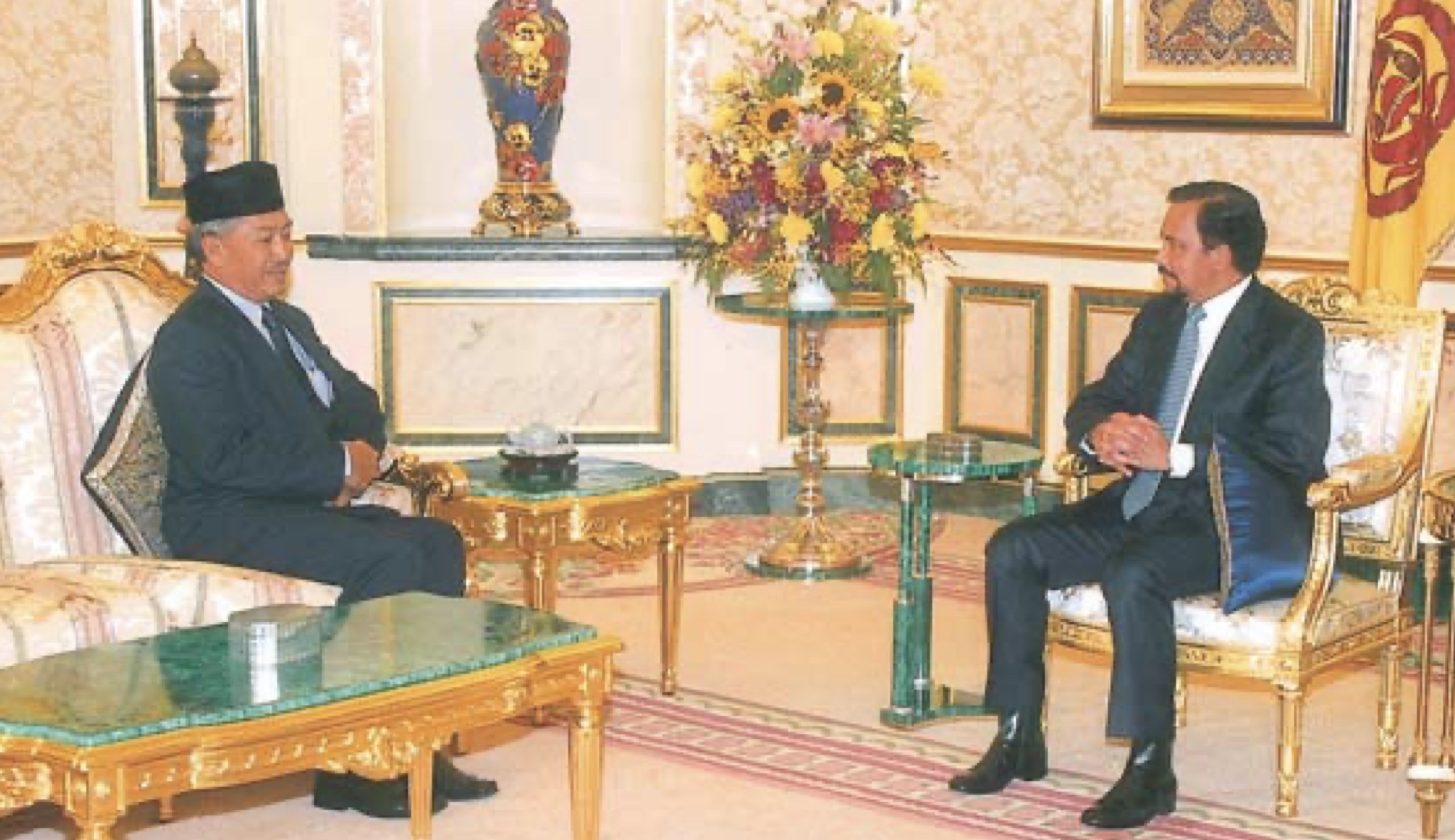
- Ambassador Jamil and Sultan Hassanal Bolkiah in 2004

Deputy Inspector-General of Police (Malaysia)
- In office 9 January 1999 – 12 May 2002
- Preceded by: Norian Mai
- Succeeded by: Mohd Bakri Omar

Personal details
- Born: 1947 (age 78–79) Kuching, Crown Colony of Sarawak
- Spouse: Puan Sri Zahrah Seruji

Mohd Jamil bin Johari (born 1947) is a Malaysian diplomat and former police officer who served as Deputy Inspector-General of Police from 9 January 1999 to 12 May 2002.

== Early life ==
Mohd Jamil Johari was born in 1947 in Kuching, Sarawak. He holds a Bachelor of Arts (Hons) Degree and a Diploma in Education from the University of Malaya.

In addition, he also obtained a Master of Arts in political science from the University of Washington, Seattle, Washington, United States Of America.

== Police career ==
He joined the Royal Malaysia Police in January 1971 as Cadet Assistant Superintendent of Police, during his police career he has held Bentong District Police Chief, Kuantan District Police Chief, Head of Sarawak Special Branch, Sarawak Deputy Police Commissioner, Sabah Police Commissioner, deputy director of Bukit Aman Criminal Investigation Department and Director of Management Department. On 8 January 1999, he appointed as Deputy Inspector General of Police and retired in May 2004. Thereafter, he was appointed as High Commissioner of Malaysia to Brunei until July 2004.

== Post career ==
He is currently a member of the Board of Trustees of Yayasan Pengaman Malaysia. He also a member of the Audit Committee and the Nomination Committee.

== Honours ==
- Malaysia
  - Officer of the Order of the Defender of the Realm (KMN) (1984)
  - Companion of the Order of the Defender of the Realm (JMN) (1996)
  - Commander of the Order of Loyalty to the Crown of Malaysia (PSM) – Tan Sri (2001)
- Sabah
  - Commander of the Order of Kinabalu (PGDK) – Datuk (1992)
- Pahang
  - Knight Companion of the Order of Sultan Ahmad Shah of Pahang (DSAP) – Dato' (1998)
- Sarawak
  - Gold Medal of the Sarawak Independence Diamond Jubilee Medal (2023)
  - Gold Medal of the Civil Administration Medal (PPC) (1987)
  - Knight Commander of the Most Exalted Order of the Star of Sarawak (PNBS) – Dato Sri (2001)
- Royal Malaysia Police
  - Courageous Commander of the Most Gallant Police Order (PGPP) (1997)
