= Abdul Rahman Hashim =

Inspector-General of Police of Malaysia from 1973 to 1974

Yang Berbahagia Tan Sri Dato' Abdul Rahman Hashim PMN DPMK JMN AMN BBU (Indonesia) GCCT (Thailand) CPM
- عبدالرحمن هاشم

3rd Inspector-General of Police (Malaysia)
- In office 1 February 1973 – 7 June 1974
- Monarch: Abdul Halim
- Prime Minister: Abdul Razak Hussein
- Minister: Ismail Abdul Rahman; Ghazali Shafie
- Preceded by: Mohamed Salleh Ismael
- Succeeded by: Mohammed Hanif Omar

Deputy Inspector-General of Police (Malaysia)
- In office 31 January 1972 – 1 February 1973
- Monarch: Abdul Halim
- Prime Minister: Abdul Razak Hussein
- Minister: Ismail Abdul Rahman
- Inspector-General: Mohamed Salleh Ismael
- Preceded by: Mohamed Salleh Ismael
- Succeeded by: Mohammed Hanif Omar

Personal details
- Born: 7 July 1923 Yan, Kedah, Unfederated Malay States, British Malaya (now Malaysia)
- Died: 7 June 1974 (aged 50) Kuala Lumpur, Malaysia
- Cause of death: Assassination
- Resting place: Jalan Ampang Muslim Cemetery, Kuala Lumpur
- Spouse: Halimah Mohamed Isa
- Children: 7 (included Najib Abdul Rahman)

Abdul Rahman bin Hashim (Jawi: عبد الرحمن بن هاشم; 7 July 1923 – 7 June 1974) was a Malaysian police officer who served as the third Inspector-General of Police from February 1973 until his assassination. He served as the Deputy Inspector-General of Police from January 1972 to February 1973.

== Education ==
- After completing his schooling, he became a Kedah State Police Officer with the rank of Sub-Inspector (17 October 1941)
- Kuala Nerang District Police Chief
- Baling District Police Chief (1948)
- Criminal Investigation Officer (1949)
- Assistant Superintendent of Police (January 1952)
- Assistant District Police Chief of Kulai, Johor
- Police Range Officer in Batu Gajah. He was sent to attend the Criminal Investigation Course for 3 months at MillMeece Stafford, United Kingdom (April 1953) and the Senior Officer Course for six months at Rynton-on-Dunsmore or Bramshill Police College in the United Kingdom (1957).
- Head of the Penang Special Branch (1960)
- Deputy Director of the Special Branch (1963)
- Director of the Special Branch (1971)
- Deputy Inspector-General of Police (1972)
- 3rd Inspector-General of Police (1 February 1973 – 7 June 1974).

== Police career ==
- Chief Sub Inspector – 17 October 1941
- Probationary Inspector – 1 April 1946
- Baling District Police Chief – January 1948
- Criminal Investigating Officer in Kajang (Insp.) – May 1949
- Kulai District Police Chief, Johor – January 1952
- 3 month Criminal Investigation Department course at Mill Mecee Stafford, United Kingdom. Returned and worked at the Kuala Lumpur Special Branch – 21 April 1953
- Head Coach at the Special Branch Training School – 16 March 1954
- Course at Rynston on Dunsmore or Bramshill Police College, United Kingdom – 22 September 1957
- Head of Penang Special Branch – 1960
- Deputy Director of Special Branch – 1963
- Director of Special Branch – 1971
- Deputy Inspector General of Police – 31 January 1972
- Inspector General of Police on 1 February 1973 until the date of his death on 7 June 1974

== Death ==
While serving as Inspector-General of Police (1973-1974), he was shot by the communists in Jalan Tun Perak, Kuala Lumpur on 7 June 1974. He had served in the Special Branch for 19 years. He had served with the National Police Service for 32 years, holding various positions. The year 1974-1975 was the second year of the communist uprising in Malaysia after 1948-1960. The National Monument was also blown up. The Vietnam War between the United States and Vietnam was won by Vietnamese guerrillas.

The assassination was on the orders of Chin Peng of the Malayan Communist Party. However, Karpal Singh requested further clarification of the mystery of the assassination because there was no clear evidence.

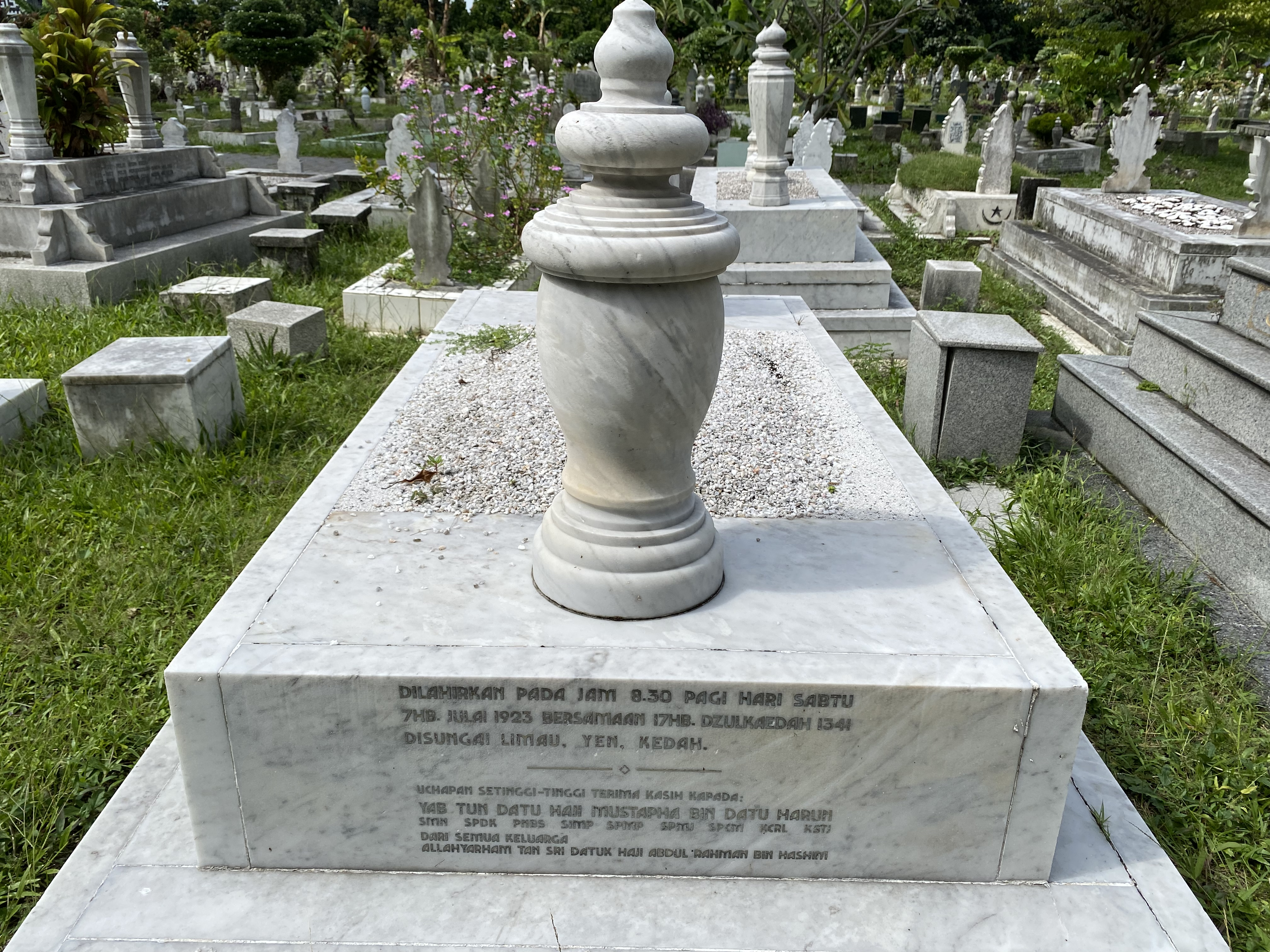
Abdul Rahman's grave at Jalan Ampang Muslim Cemetery, Kuala Lumpur.

== Honours ==
- Malaya
  - Member of the Order of the Defender of the Realm (AMN) (1961)
- Malaysia
  - Recipient of the Malaysian Commemorative Medal (Silver) (PPM) (1965)
  - Companion of the Order of the Defender of the Realm (JMN) (1968)
  - Commander of the Order of the Defender of the Realm (PMN) – Tan Sri (1974)
- Kedah
  - Companion of the Order of the Crown of Kedah (SMK)
  - Knight Commander of the Order of the Crown of Kedah (DPMK) – Dato'

=== Commonwealth Honours ===
- United Kingdom
  - Recipient of the Colonial Police Medal (CPM) (1957)

=== Foreign Honours ===
- Thailand
  - Knight Grand Cross of the Order of the Crown of Thailand (GCCT) (1974 – posthumously)
