= Mazlan Lazim =

Malaysian police officer (born 1961)

Yang Berbahagia Tan Sri Dato' Mazlan Lazim PSM SPSK DGPN SMW DPSK DIMP DMSM PGPP JSM BCN SMP PSK PSPP AMK PMP PKT PBM PPS PPA PJPN
- مصلان بن لازم

Deputy Inspector-General of Police (Malaysia)
- In office 25 June 2021 – 25 December 2021
- Nominated by: Muhyiddin Yassin
- Appointed by: Abdullah
- Monarch: Abdullah
- Prime Minister: Muhyiddin Yassin (2021); Ismail Sabri Yaakob (2021)
- Minister: Hamzah Zainudin
- Inspector-General: Acryl Sani Abdullah Sani
- Preceded by: Acryl Sani Abdullah Sani
- Succeeded by: Razarudin Husain

Personal details
- Born: Mazlan bin Lazim; 25 December 1961 (age 64) Alor Setar, Kedah, Federation of Malaya (now Malaysia)
- Citizenship: Malaysian
- Spouse: Puan Sri Datin Seri Anizah Musa
- Education: Universiti Putra Malaysia
- Occupation: Police officer

Mazlan bin Lazim (Jawi: مصلان بن لازم; born 25 December 1961) is a retired Malaysian police officer who served as the Deputy Inspector-General of Police of Malaysia (DIG) under Inspector-General (IGP) Acryl Sani Abdullah Sani from June to December 2021. He was the director of the Bukit Aman Logistics and Technology Department of the Royal Malaysia Police (PDRM) and had stints as police chief for Kelantan and Kuala Lumpur.

== Education ==
Mazlan graduated from Universiti Putra Malaysia with a Bachelor of Economic degree and also obtained a Master of Human Resources Management degree.

== Police career ==
Mazlan joined the Royal Malaysia Police as Cadet Assistant Superintendent of Police on 2 February 1986. He had served as Melaka Tengah Deputy District Police Chief; Tanah Merah Deputy District Police Chief, Kelantan, Shah Alam Deputy District Police Chief, Selangor; Training Staff Officer at Kuala Kubu Bharu Police College, Selangor and Budget Officer, Bukit Aman Training Division, Padang Besar District Police Chief, Perlis in 2002, Seberang Perai Utara District Police Chief, Penang in 2004, Head of Kelantan Contingent Criminal Investigation Department in 2006, Kelantan Police Chief in 2014, Director General of Department Protection, Prime Minister's Department in 2016, Kuala Lumpur Police Chief in 2017 and then Director of Logistics and Technology Department in 2020.

== Honours ==
- Malaysia
  - Commander of the Order of Loyalty to the Crown of Malaysia (PSM) – Tan Sri (2022)
  - Companion of the Order of Loyalty to the Crown of Malaysia (JSM) (2014)
  - Recipient of the Loyal Service Medal (PPS)
  - Recipient of the General Service Medal (PPA)
  - Recipient of the 15th Yang di-Pertuan Agong Installation Medal
  - Recipient of the 16th Yang di-Pertuan Agong Installation Medal
- Royal Malaysia Police
  - Courageous Commander of the Most Gallant Police Order (PGPP) (2021)
  - Loyal Commander of the Most Gallant Police Order (PSPP) (2011)
  - Recipient of the National Hero Service Medal (PJPN)
- Federal Territory (Malaysia)
  - Grand Commander of the Order of the Territorial Crown (SMW) – Datuk Seri (2018)
- Kedah
  - Member of the Order of the Crown of Kedah (AMK) (2006)
- Kelantan
  - Knight Grand Commander of the Order of Loyalty to the Crown of Kelantan (SPSK) – Dato' (2015)
  - Knight Commander of the Order of Loyalty to the Crown of Kelantan (DPSK) – Dato' (2011)
  - Commander of the Order of Loyalty to the Crown of Kelantan (PSK) (2007)
- Malacca
  - Companion Class I of the Exalted Order of Malacca (DMSM) – Datuk (2016)
  - Recipient of the Government Service Medal (PBM)
- Pahang
  - Knight Companion of the Order of the Crown of Pahang (DIMP) – Dato' (2010)
  - Companion of the Order of the Crown of Pahang (SMP) (2008)
- Penang
  - Commander of the Order of the Defender of State (DGPN) – Dato' Seri (2020)
  - Recipient of Distinguished Service Star (BCN) (2005)
  - Recipient of the Distinguished Conduct Medal (PKT)
- Perlis
  - Medal of the Order of the Crown of Perlis (PMP) (2003)
