= Acryl Sani Abdullah Sani =

13th Inspector-General of Police (Malaysia)

Yang Berbahagia Tan Sri Dato' Seri Panglima Acryl Sani Abdullah Sani PGPP PMN SPTS SPDK SSAP PSPP PJN DUBC DPPN DPTS DGSM DIMP KMN
- اقر الثاني عبدﷲ ثاني

13th Inspector-General of Police (Malaysia)
- In office 4 May 2021 – 22 June 2023
- Monarch: Abdullah
- Prime Minister: Muhyiddin Yassin (2021); Ismail Sabri Yaakob (2021–2022); Anwar Ibrahim (2022–2023)
- Minister: Hamzah Zainudin (2021–2022); Saifuddin Nasution Ismail (2022–2023)
- Deputy: Mazlan Lazim (2021); Razarudin Husain (2021–2023)
- Preceded by: Abdul Hamid Bador
- Succeeded by: Razarudin Husain

Deputy Inspector-General of Police (Malaysia)
- In office 14 August 2020 – 4 May 2021
- Monarch: Abdullah
- Prime Minister: Muhyiddin Yassin
- Minister: Hamzah Zainudin
- Inspector-General: Abdul Hamid Bador
- Preceded by: Mazlan Mansor
- Succeeded by: Mazlan Lazim

Personal details
- Born: 3 October 1961 (age 65) Petaling Jaya, Selangor, Federation of Malaya (now Malaysia)
- Citizenship: Malaysian
- Spouse: Zaitun Mohd Isa
- Education: Universiti Teknologi Malaysia (BEng); Universiti Utara Malaysia (MSc)
- Occupation: Police officer

Acryl Sani bin Abdullah Sani (Jawi: اقر الثاني عبدﷲ ثاني; born 3 October 1961) is a Malaysian retired police officer who served as the 13th Inspector-General of Police (IGP) from May 2021 to his retirement in June 2023 and the Deputy Inspector-General of Police (DIG) from August 2020 to his promotion to the IGP in May 2021.

== Education ==
Acryl Sani graduated from Universiti Teknologi Malaysia with a Bachelor of Engineering degree in civil engineering. He also obtained a Master of Science degree in management from the Universiti Utara Malaysia.

== Career ==
Acryl Sani joined the police force on 2 February 1986 as a Cadet Assistant Superintendent. Since then, he has held various positions in the police force, including Director of Internal Security and Public Order Department, Director of Commercial Criminal Investigation Department, Department of Strategic Resources and Technology Department and Sarawak Police Commissioner.

=== Deputy Inspector-General of Police ===
Acryl Sani rose to the rank of DIG on 14 August 2020 and has taken the office of DIG from the retiring Mazlan Mansor.

=== Inspector-General of Police ===
Minister of Home Affairs Hamzah Zainudin announced on 30 April 2021 that Acryl Sani will replace the retiring Abdul Hamid Bador as the 13th and new IGP with effect on 4 May 2021 after the contract of Abdul Hamid ends on 3 May 2021 and presented him with the appointment document. On 3 May 2021, the handing-over ceremony of IGP was held and the powers of IGP were officially transitioned to Acryl Sani and marked the end of IGP term of Abdul Hamid, he also pledged to announce the new directions of PDRM in future and to do his best in this most important appointment. On 6 May 2021, Acryl Sani held a press conference at Bukit Aman to announce the identifications of the candidates of his deputy, the new Deputy Inspector-General of Police and claimed that he would discuss list of candidates and appointments of several Bukit Aman department directors to replace the incumbent directors who are scheduled to retire between May and September 2021 with Hamzah and Secretary-General of the Ministry of Home Affairs (KDN) before shortlisted names are referred to the Police Force Commission (SPP). The announcement of the appointments of new Deputy IGP and several Bukit Aman department director will be made after Hari Raya.

== Honours ==
- Malaysia
  - Officer of the Order of the Defender of the Realm (KMN) (1999)
  - Commander of the Order of Meritorious Service (PJN) – Datuk (2019)
  - Commander of the Order of the Defender of the Realm (PMN) – Tan Sri (2021)
- Royal Malaysia Police
  - Loyal Commander of The Most Gallant Police Order (PSPP) (2011)
  - Courageous Commander of The Most Gallant Police Order (PGPP) (2016)
- Pahang
  - Knight Companion of the Order of the Crown of Pahang (DIMP) – Dato' (2006)
  - Knight Grand Companion of the Order of Sultan Ahmad Shah of Pahang (SSAP) – Dato' Sri (2016)
- Perak
  - Knight Commander of the Order of Taming Sari (DPTS) – Dato' Pahlawan (2015)
  - Knight Grand Commander of the Order of Taming Sari (SPTS) – Dato' Seri Panglima (2020)
- Penang
  - Knight Commander of the Order of the Defender of State (DPPN) – Dato' Seri (2020)
- Malacca
  - Grand Commander of the Exalted Order of Malacca (DGSM) – Datuk Seri (2021)
- Sabah
  - Grand Commander of the Order of Kinabalu (SPDK) – Datuk Seri Panglima (2023)

=== Foreign honours ===
- Singapore
  - Recipient of the Darjah Utama Bakti Cemerlang (DUBC) (2024)
