= Noor Rashid Ibrahim =

Malaysian police officer

Yang Berbahagia Tan Sri Dato' Sri Noor Rashid Ibrahim PSM SSAP DGPN SPTS PGDK DSDK PGPP PSPP AMK PKT PKT BCK PPA
- نور راشد بن ابراهيم

Deputy Inspector-General of Police (Malaysia)
- In office 3 December 2014 – 14 March 2019
- Nominated by: Najib Razak
- Appointed by: Abdul Halim
- Monarchs: Abdul Halim; Muhammad V Abdullah
- Prime Minister: Najib Razak; Mahathir Mohamad
- Minister: Ahmad Zahid Hamidi; Muhyiddin Yassin
- Preceded by: Mohd Bakri Mohd Zinin; Mohamad Fuzi Harun (acting)
- Succeeded by: Abdul Hamid Bador (acting); Mazlan Mansor

Personal details
- Born: Noor Rashid bin Ibrahim; 17 March 1958 (age 68) Yan District, Kedah, Federation of Malaya (now Malaysia)
- Citizenship: Malaysian
- Education: University of Malaya
- Occupation: Police officer

Noor Rashid bin Ibrahim (Jawi: نور راشد بن ابراهيم; born 17 March 1958) is a retired Malaysian police officer who served as the Deputy Inspector-General of Police of Malaysia (DIG). He was also formerly the director of the Narcotics Crime Investigation Department (NCID) of the Royal Malaysia Police (PDRM) and Police Commissioner of the Malaysian state of Sabah.

== Education ==
Noor Rashid graduated from the University of Malaya with a Bachelor of Science (Honours) (B.Sc. (Hons.)).

== Career ==
Noor Rashid joined the PDRM on 8 January 1984 as an Assistant Superintendent of Police (ASP) and among the positions he has held are the Head of Northeast Criminal Investigation Department, Central Seberang Prai District Police Chief, Penang; Deputy Director of Narcotics Criminal Investigation Department (JSJN), Sabah Police Commissioner and Director of Narcotics Criminal Investigation Department.

During Noor Rashid's tenure as the NCID director, he oversaw several raids that resulted in the seizure of large amounts of narcotics and increases of both offenders and seized value. This included the arrest of an Iranian drug lord who had in his possession an excess of RM3 million worth of narcotics.

Noor Rashid was supposed to retire in March 2018 after he reached the mandatory retirement age but had his tenure extended by one more year. In September 2018, Noor Rashid informed the press that the PDRM detected 132 money laundering transactions and had recorded statements from more than 50 individuals who had received funds totalling US$972 million from the personal bank account of former Prime Minister of Malaysia, Najib Razak. He also professed his support for the setting up of the long-awaited Independent Police Complaints and Misconduct Commission (IPCMC), which was first recommended by the Royal Commission to Enhance the Operation and Management of the Royal Malaysia Force in 2005, as it would enhance integrity within the PDRM. In October 2018, he said that the PDRM will investigate the claim by the youth wing of the National Trust Party's (AMANAH) Terengganu chapter that an alleged sum of RM2.5 million transferred by the United Malay National Organisation (UMNO) to the Malaysian Islamic Party (PAS) is tied to the 1Malaysia Development Berhad scandal. In November 2018, Noor Rashid indicated that there were unspecified parties who were attempting to stir up racial sentiments following the Government of Malaysia's decision to ratify the International Convention on the Elimination of All Forms of Racial Discrimination (ICERD).

In January 2019, Noor Rashid was forced to publicly defend the move to apply the highly-controversial Sedition Act 1948 on those deemed to have insulted the royal institution. In February 2019, Noor Rashid announced the formation of a special task force specifically handling reports concerning insults towards religion, race, and the royal institution. In March 2019, he retired from the PDRM after a career spanning 35 years and was succeeded by Special Branch (SB) director Abdul Hamid Bador.

== Honours ==
- Malaysia
  - Commander of the Order of Loyalty to the Crown of Malaysia (PSM) – Tan Sri (2016)
  - Recipient of the General Service Medal (PPA)
  - Recipient of the 15th Yang di-Pertuan Agong Installation Medal
- Royal Malaysia Police
  - Courageous Commander of the Most Gallant Police Order (PGPP) (2011)
  - Loyal Commander of the Most Gallant Police Order (PSPP)
- Kedah
  - Knight Companion of the Order of Loyalty to the Royal House of Kedah (DSDK) – Dato' (2008)
  - Member of the Order of the Crown of Kedah (AMK) (2007)
  - State of Kedah Distinguished Service Star (BCK) (1995)
- Pahang
  - Grand Knight of the Order of Sultan Ahmad Shah of Pahang (SSAP) – Dato' Sri (2013)
  - Recipient of the Distinguished Conduct Medal (PKT)
- Penang
  - Commander of the Order of the Defender of State (DGPN) – Dato' Seri (2015)
  - Recipient of the Distinguished Conduct Medal (PKT)
- Perak
  - Knight Grand Commander of the Order of Taming Sari (SPTS) – Dato' Seri Panglima (2017)
- Sabah
  - Commander of the Order of Kinabalu (PGDK) – Datuk (2007)
