= Abdul Hamid Bador =

12th Inspector-General of Police (Malaysia)

Yang Berbahagia Tan Sri Dato' Seri Panglima Abdul Hamid Bador PMN SPTS SSNS PSM DPPN DPNS DIMP JMN AMN
- عبد الحميد بادر

12th Inspector-General of Police (Malaysia)
- In office 4 May 2019 – 3 May 2021
- Monarch: Abdullah
- Prime Minister: Mahathir Mohamad (2019–2020); Muhyiddin Yassin (2020–2021)
- Minister: Muhyiddin Yassin (2019–2020); Hamzah Zainuddin (2020–2021)
- Deputy: Mazlan Mansor (2019–2020); Acryl Sani Abdullah Sani (2020–2021)
- Preceded by: Mohamad Fuzi Harun
- Succeeded by: Acryl Sani Abdullah Sani

Deputy Inspector-General of Police (Malaysia) Acting
- In office 15 March 2019 – 4 May 2019
- Monarch: Abdullah
- Prime Minister: Mahathir Mohamad
- Minister: Muhyiddin Yassin
- Inspector-General: Mohamad Fuzi Harun
- Preceded by: Noor Rashid Ibrahim
- Succeeded by: Mazlan Mansor

Personal details
- Born: Abdul Hamid bin Bador; 7 August 1958 (age 68) Kuala Lumpur, Selangor, Federation of Malaya (now Malaysia)
- Citizenship: Malaysian
- Parent: Constable Bador Ijoh (father)
- Education: National University of Malaysia; University of Birmingham
- Occupation: Police officer

Abdul Hamid bin Bador (Jawi: عبد الحميد بن بادر; born 7 August 1958) is a Malaysian retired police officer who served as the 12th Inspector-General of Police (IGP) from May 2019 to May 2021. He was the Acting Deputy Inspector-General of Police of Malaysia (DIGP) and Director of the Special Branch (SB) of the Royal Malaysian Police (PDRM).

== Education ==
Abdul Hamid graduated from the National University of Malaysia (UKM) with a degree in policing science in 2001. In 2008, he also attended the University of Birmingham as a Chevening Scholar.

== 1MDB scandal ==
On 18 August 2015, Abdul Hamid was removed from his post as deputy director (I) of the SB and transferred to the Prime Minister's Department having served in the PDRM for 37 years. He was supposed to helm a newly created 'Security and Transnational' division at the Prime Minister's Department. However, he created a controversy by refusing to clock in at the Prime Minister's Department and suggesting that it was part of a cover-up into the investigations of the 1Malaysia Development Berhad scandal. Alleging that his transfer was the consequence of publicly showing support towards former Prime Minister of Malaysia Mahathir Mohamad, a vocal critic of then Prime Minister Najib Razak, he insisted that he will not back down from criticising the handling of the 1MDB investigations despite becoming the target of clandestine operations by 'friendly' agencies. He was removed almost simultaneously with the then Attorney General of Malaysia, Abdul Gani Patail, SB director, Akhil Bulat, and the Commissioner of the Malaysian Anti-Corruption Commission (MACC), Abu Kassim Mohamed, and his deputy, Mohamad Shukri Abdull.

On 21 May 2018, following Najib's and Barisan Nasional's (BN) defeat in the 2018 Malaysian general election, Abdul Hamid, together with Abdul Gani, Abu Kassim and Mohd Shukri, were appointed to the 1MDB special investigation task force by the newly elected Pakatan Harapan (PH) government. Two days later, Abdul Hamid was reappointed to the SB, but as its new director, following the expedited retirement of Mohamad Mokhtar Mohd Shariff.

== Deputy Inspector-General of Police ==
On 15 March 2019, following Noor Rashid Ibrahim's retirement from the PDRM, Abdul Hamid took over acting duties of the DIG. He was also widely expected to take over as Malaysia's top cop with current Inspector-General of Police (IGP) Mohamad Fuzi Harun due to retire in May 2019. Following the Human Rights Commission of Malaysia's (SUHAKAM) announcement that its findings concluded that the SB was responsible for the disappearances of Amri Che Mat and Raymond Koh in 2016 and 2017 respectively, and still missing as of 2019, Abdul Hamid rapped SUHAKAM for causing negative impact towards the PDRM. He added that he was confident that IGP Mohamad Fuzi, then SB director, would provide an answer to the allegations.

In April 2019, Abdul Hamid called for members of the PDRM to be impartial towards any race or religion in carrying out their duties. Following events of the 2019 Sri Lanka Easter bombings, Abdul Hamid directed the PDRM to step up security levels at worship and diplomatic compounds around the nation. Shortly after, the acting DIG informed the press that the PDRM arrested a controversial preacher linked to Zakir Naik for allegedly insulting Hinduism after receiving nearly 800 reports made against the former.

== Inspector-General of Police ==
Following IGP Mohamad Fuzi Harun's imminent retirement on 4 May 2019, Prime Minister Mahathir indicated to the press that Abdul Hamid will be confirmed as Malaysia's 12th IGP following approval from the King (Yang di-Pertuan Agong). However, some reports suggests that the appointment has not been finalised yet. This was shortly after rumours circulated that there was a lack of consensus of Abdul Hamid's appointment within the PDRM. Minister of Home Affairs, Muhyiddin Yassin, announced on 2 May 2019 that Abdul Hamid will indeed succeed Mohamad Fuzi as IGP for an initial two-year term beginning 4 May 2019. It was reported that deputy director (I) of SB, Ramli Hassan, will succeed Abdul Hamid as director in an acting capacity when the latter takes office as IGP. On 6 May 2019, Abdul Hamid confirmed that former Goldman Sachs banker Roger Ng had been extradited to the United States to face charges there in relation to the 1MDB scandal. Following a meeting with the National Governance, Integrity and Anti-Corruption Centre (GIACC), Abdul Hamid announced that the PDRM has agreed to the long-awaited introduction of the Independent Police Complaints and Misconduct Commission (IPCMC). This was following recent comments from outgoing IGP, Mohamad Fuzi, voicing his opposition to the IPCMC. The IPCMC previously received vocal support from Abdul Hamid and was first recommended 14 years ago by the Royal Commission to Enhance the Operation and Management of the Royal Malaysia Force. Soon after, he ordered the PDRM's Criminal Investigation Department (CID) and Integrity and Standards Compliance Department (ISCD) to investigate reports that two members of the PDRM had extorted money from a civilian. Abdul Hamid gained prominence for making impromptu visits to police stations. He later publicly warned members of the PDRM to sever any ties they may have with crime syndicates across the country "before it's too late". On the same day, he told fugitive Low Taek Jho, publicly known as Jho Low, wanted for various corruption charges related to the 1MDB scandal, to return to Malaysia to face charges and added that the PDRM will ensure of the latter's safety after Abdul Hamid himself declared that the PDRM had new leads in Low's whereabouts. On 30 May 2019, Abdul Hamid told reporters that he expected Jho Low to be arrested soon.

Following his previous call to his fellow officers to distance themselves from criminals and corruption just slightly more than a week before, Abdul Hamid issued another stern warning in early June 2019 to his colleagues after reports emerged that several officers in charge of police districts (OCPDs) solicited funds for Eid al-Fitr celebrations. He also remarked that any officers involved will face immediate transfers. He also urged the public to exercise patience regarding Jho Low's return after messages reading that the fugitive had been arrested went viral on social media but revealed that the PDRM has become aware of Low's whereabouts. On 10 June 2019, Abdul Hamid urged the government to increase the salaries of lower-ranked policemen as a means to cover living costs and also in an attempt to increase integrity. Later, he reiterated that the PDRM was in the midst of thrashing out a deal with an unnamed Asian country, where Low is residing, to facilitate the latter's return to Malaysia. Whilst he also added that he was hugely disappointed with the former IGP, Khalid Abu Bakar, for acting "unprofessionally" by following alleged political decisions to remove then-SB director Akhil Bulat and Abdul Hamid himself back in 2015, Abdul Hamid refused to divulge what he meant in a vaguely worded sentence he addressed, in an open letter, to another of his predecessors, IGP Mohamad Fuzi.

== Honours ==
- Malaysia
  - Member of the Order of the Defender of the Realm (AMN) (1998)
  - Companion of the Order of the Defender of the Realm (JMN) (2014)
  - Commander of the Order of Loyalty to the Crown of Malaysia (PSM) – Tan Sri (2019)
  - Commander of the Order of the Defender of the Realm (PMN) – Tan Sri (2020)
- Pahang
  - Knight Companion of the Order of the Crown of Pahang (DIMP) – Dato' (2007)
- Negeri Sembilan
  - Knight Commander of the Order of Loyalty to Negeri Sembilan (DPNS) – Dato' (2013)
  - Knight Grand Companion of the Order of Loyalty to Negeri Sembilan (SSNS) – Dato' Seri (2019)
- Penang
  - Knight Commander of the Order of the Defender of State (DPPN) – Dato' Seri (2019)
- Perak
  - Knight Grand Commander of the Order of Taming Sari (SPTS) – Dato' Seri Panglima (2019)

=== Foreign Honours ===
- Indonesia
  - Bintang Bhayangkara Nararya (7 August 2015)
  - Bintang Bhayangkara Utama (30 December 2020)
