= Mohamad Fuzi Harun =

11th Inspector-General of Police of Malaysia

Yang Berbahagia Tan Sri Dato' Seri Mohamad Fuzi Harun PMN PGPP PJN SIMP DCSM SPDK SPTS DIMP PGDK ACM BCM KMN DUBC (Singapore) PJG (Singapore) BB (Indonesia)
- محمد فوزي هارون

11th Inspector-General of Police (Malaysia)
- In office 4 September 2017 – 4 May 2019
- Monarchs: Muhammad V Abdullah
- Prime Minister: Najib Razak; Mahathir Mohamad
- Minister: Ahmad Zahid Hamidi; Muhyiddin Yassin
- Deputy: Noor Rashid Ibrahim; Abdul Hamid Bador (Acting)
- Preceded by: Khalid Abu Bakar
- Succeeded by: Abdul Hamid Bador

Deputy Inspector-General of Police (Malaysia) (Acting)
- In office 7 September 2014 – 2 December 2014
- Monarch: Abdul Halim of Kedah
- Prime Minister: Najib Razak
- Minister: Ahmad Zahid Hamidi
- Preceded by: Mohd Bakri Mohd Zinin
- Succeeded by: Noor Rashid Ibrahim

Personal details
- Born: 4 May 1959 (age 67) Parit, Perak, Federation of Malaya (now Malaysia)
- Citizenship: Malaysian
- Spouse(s): Azizah Hamdi (died 2017) Noraesyah Shaari (m. 2020)
- Education: National University of Malaysia; University of Malaya
- Occupation: Police officer

Mohamad Fuzi bin Harun (Jawi: محمد فوزي هارون; born 4 May 1959) is a retired Malaysian police officer who served as the 11th Inspector-General of Police of Malaysia (IGP). He was also former acting Deputy Inspector-General of Police of Malaysia and director of the Special Branch (SB) of the Royal Malaysia Police (PDRM).

== Career ==
Fuzi joined the police force as Cadet Assistant Superintendent of Police.

1. 1986–1992 - Special Branch (Social Intelligence)

2. 1992–1994 - Continue Learning

3. 1994–1997 - Special Branch of the Secretariat Division

4. 1998–2005 - Head of Special Branch, Sabah Contingent Police Headquarters

5. 2005–2007 - Special Branch (Political Intelligence)

6. 2007–2009 - Deputy Director II Special Branch, Bukit Aman

7. 2009–2014 - Director of Special Task Force (Counter Terrorism), Bukit Aman

8. 2014–2015 - Director of Managing Department, Bukit Aman

9. 2015–2017 - Director of Special Branch, Bukit Aman

10. 2017–2019 - Inspector General of Police

== Honours ==
=== Honours of Malaysia ===
- Malaysia
  - Officer of the Order of the Defender of the Realm (KMN) (2000)
  - Commander of the Order of Meritorious Service (PJN) – Datuk (2012)
  - Commander of the Order of the Defender of the Realm (PMN) – Tan Sri (2017)
- Royal Malaysia Police
  - Courageous Commander of the Most Gallant Police Order (PGPP) (2009)
- Pahang
  - Knight Companion of the Order of the Crown of Pahang (DIMP) – Dato' (2004)
  - Grand Knight of the Order of the Crown of Pahang (SIMP) – Dato' Indera (2008)
  - Grand Knight of the Order of Sultan Ahmad Shah of Pahang (SSAP) – Dato' Sri (2016)
- Malacca
  - Distinguished Service Star (BCM) (2003)
  - Knight Commander of the Exalted Order of Malacca (DCSM) – Datuk Wira (2016)
- Perak
  - Member of the Order of Cura Si Manja Kini (ACM) (2003)
  - Knight Grand Commander of the Order of Taming Sari (SPTS) – Dato' Seri Panglima (2012)
- Sabah
  - Commander of the Order of Kinabalu (PGDK) – Datuk (2015)
  - Grand Commander of the Order of Kinabalu (SPDK) – Datuk Seri Panglima (2017)

=== Foreign honours ===
- Indonesia
  - National Police Meritorious Service Star 1st Class (BB) (2018)
- Singapore
  - Meritorious Service Medal (PJG) (2017)
  - Distinguished Service Order (DUBC) (2019)
