= Security Liaison Officer =

Intelligence officers posted at various Canadian embassies

Security Liaison Officers (SLO) of the Canadian Security Intelligence Service are posted at Canadian embassies and consulates to gather security-related intelligence from other nations. This information may be gathered from other national intelligence agencies, law enforcement services and public sources.

SLOs also assess potential immigrants to Canada for security issue.

== Past Security Liaison Officers ==
- Peter Marwitz served as an SLO to the Department of Foreign Affairs and International Trade from 1990 to 1993.
- J. A. Mike Aubry was serving as an SLO to the Department of Foreign Affairs and International Trade as of November 2001.
- William Murray Genik was serving as an SLO to the Department of Foreign Affairs and International Trade as of November 2001.
