= Fahmi Reza =

Malaysian graphic designer and satirist

- فهمى رضا
- Born: Mohd Fahmi Reza bin Mohd Zarin; 7 June 1977 (age 49); Kuala Lumpur, Malaysia
- Education: Vanderbilt University (BE)
- Occupations: Satirist, graphic designer, street artist, filmmaker
- Notable work: Clown portrayal of Malaysian Prime Minister, Najib Razak Portraying Malaysian politicians in a satirical and comedic way

Mohd Fahmi Reza bin Mohd Zarin (Jawi: محمد فهمى رضا بن محمد زارين; born 7 June 1977) is a Malaysian political graphic designer, street artist and documentary filmmaker. He is best known for depicting Malaysia's sixth Prime Minister, Najib Razak, as a clown. He is also known for portraying Malaysian politicians, whom most of them are accused to corruption charges in a satirical way and has seen been arrested multiple times since the clown portrayal of Najib.

== Early life and education ==
Mohd Fahmi Reza bin Mohd Zarin was born in Kuala Lumpur, Malaysia on 7 June 1977. He received his Bachelor of Electrical Engineering (BEng) from the Vanderbilt University in 1999.

== Legal action ==
Fahmi Reza creating his clown portrayal of Prime Minister Najib Razak

=== Clown caricature ===
On 6 June 2016, Fahmi was charged with 'violating multimedia laws' as a result of his clown caricature. He had created the image as a protest against prime minister Najib Razak, who has been facing allegations that billions of dollars were stolen from a state-owned development fund he oversees. Najib is also being accused of accepting a mysterious US$681 million overseas payment.

Earlier in the year, on 30 January, Fahmi had posted the sketch to his Twitter account with the caption: "In 2015, the Sedition Act was used 91 times. Tapi dalam negara yang penuh dengan korupsi, kita semua penghasut (But in a country full of corruption, we are all instigators).” Police had earlier warned Fahmi that his Twitter account was under surveillance.

The charge was made possible under Section 233(1) of the Communications and Multimedia Act 1998, which forbids online content deemed to "annoy, abuse, threaten, or harass" others. Fahmi faces a possible one-year prison sentence and a substantial fine, according to his attorney, Syahredzan Johan. He may face another charge under the same section of the Act, for also creating a fake Malaysian Communications and Multimedia Commission (MCMC) poster bearing the clown caricature.

Fahmi was charged with violating the law prohibiting communications that cause annoyance, and has pleaded not guilty. As of 30 December 2016, he is out on bail awaiting trial. His lawyer, Syahredzan Johan, says he faces a possible one-year prison sentence and a fine.

On 20 February 2018, Fahmi was sentenced to a month's jail and fined RM30,000 by the Sessions Court in Ipoh for a caricature depicting Najib as a clown. His lawyer Syahredzan Johan told Malaysiakini they will appeal the decision, and that a stay of execution of the sentence was granted with a bond of RM10,000.

On 11 October 2018, the Kuala Lumpur Sessions Court acquitted and discharged Fahmi on a charge of uploading a caricature of Najib on his Instagram account.

On 12 November 2018, the High Court in Ipoh set aside the prison sentence against Fahmi for uploading an offensive image of Najib on his social media account.

=== Kita Semua Penghasut T-shirts ===
On 4 June 2016, along with three other activists, Fahmi was arrested by police for selling #KitaSemuaPenghasut T-shirts at a shopping complex. The other three people arrested were event organiser Pang Khee Teik, community activist Lew Pik-Svonn and comic artist Arif Rafhan Othman. The three were being investigated for alleged offences under the Sedition Act 1948. Malaysia's National Human Rights Society (HAKAM) has condemned the arrests.

=== Insulting the Queen ===
On 23 April 2021, Fahmi was arrested for allegedly insulting the Queen of Malaysia, Tunku Azizah Aminah Maimunah Iskandariah, following queries on claims she received an unapproved COVID-19 jab. He was investigated under Section 4(1) of the Sedition Act and Section 233 of the Communications and Multimedia Act 1998. This is because he created a Spotify playlist titled "This is Dengki ke?" (meaning "This is Jealous?") with the queen's portrait as the playlist's cover photo. The playlist is still accessible on Spotify and has 2,599 followers as of June 2021. There are 101 songs in both Malay and English on that playlist and almost all the songs are related to the word "Jealousy". For example, the first song on the playlist is "Jealousy" by British rock band, Queen.

According to Malaysiakini, the Queen reportedly responded to a question about the administration of the COVID-19 vaccine at the palace with the words "Dengki ke?" (Meaning "Jealous?") on her Instagram account. The Queen's response soon garnered a lot of attention and led to widespread criticism all over social media. Hence, Fahmi's playlists was taken to have been created for the purpose of mocking the Queen for her comment. However, he was released on bail a day later.

=== Musa Aman ===
On December 31, 2024, Fahmi has been detained and jailed under MCMC Multimedia Act, in the State of Sabah due to his controversial painting on 11th Yang di-Pertua Negeri Sabah, Tun Musa Aman. In May 29, 2025, Fahmi Reza was officially banned from entering the State of Sabah.

== Activism ==
Fahmi says the charges demonstrate the effectiveness of the image, which he says expresses the idea that "the whole country has become the butt of a joke". He has vowed to keep posting satirical political images, and that he was prepared for any consequences. He says that the image “…connects with a lot of the people especially the younger generation, who are buying and wearing the T-shirts proudly, and sharing their photos wearing the T-shirts on their social media accounts".

Other graphic artists have started creating their own versions of a clown-faced Najib, using the hashtag #KitaSemuaPenghasut ("We are all instigators"). Fahmi stresses that his work generally skewers not just Najib but all sides of Malaysia's politics, where an ethnic Malay ruling elite is defending against a pan-racial opposition promising to end money politics and democratic abuses.

As a filmmaker, Fahmi won the "Most Outstanding Human Rights Film" at the 2007 Freedom Film Fest, for his documentary, Sepuluh Tahun Sebelum Merdeka (English: Ten Years Before Independence), which he says presents a story about Malaysians' struggle for independence, and the contributions of the political left.

He has frequently been banned from addressing students at the University of Malaya, on the subject of student activism. His activities have attracted the attention of media overseas, including The New York Times, VICE magazine and Le Figaro.

== See also ==
- Barack Obama "Joker" poster - political art with a similar motif
- 1Malaysia Development Berhad scandal
