= Abdul Rahim Mohd Noor =

5th Inspector-General of Royal Malaysia Police

Yang Berbahagia Tan Sri Datuk Seri Panglima Abdul Rahim Mohd Noor PMN SPDK SIMP PSM DMSM DPMS DUBC KMN
- عبدالرحيم محمد نور

5th Inspector-General of Police (Malaysia)
- In office 16 January 1994 – 7 January 1999
- Monarchs: Azlan Shah; Ja'afar
- Minister: Mahathir Mohamad
- Preceded by: Mohammed Hanif Omar
- Succeeded by: Norian Mai

Personal details
- Born: 6 June 1943 (age 83) Serkam, Malacca, Japanese occupation of Malaya
- Spouse: Puan Sri Faridah Abdul Razak

Abdul Rahim bin Mohd. Noor (born 6 June 1943) was the fifth Inspector-General of Police of Royal Malaysia Police, from 16 January 1994 to 7 January 1999.

== Career ==
Abdul Rahim became the Selangor State Police Chief on 21 July 1984 and Deputy Inspector-General of Police on 14 June 1989.

He resigned as Inspector-General of Police on 7 January 1999 for punching former Deputy Prime Minister Anwar Ibrahim while in police custody at the Bukit Aman Headquarters jail.

== Incidents ==
=== Assault of Anwar Ibrahim ===
In 1998, Abdul Rahim beat former Deputy Prime Minister Anwar Ibrahim when Anwar was in police custody at the Bukit Aman Headquarters jail. The public and the media only witnessed Anwar's black eye after he was being brought to Court for the first time after he was arrested. Abdul Rahim would then resign as Inspector-General of Police on 7 January 1999 for punching Anwar.

Abdul Rahim was subsequently found guilty of assault, and was sentenced to two months imprisonment and fined RM2,000 by the Kuala Lumpur Sessions Court on 15 March 2000. He appealed, unsuccessfully. Abdul Rahim made a public apology to Anwar and paid undisclosed damages.

=== Political view ===
On 26 October 2011, while officiating at the 2nd General Assembly of Perkasa, a far-right organisation in Malaysian politics, Abdul Rahim equated the wave of human rights activism with communism and a new religion, and said that some Malay leftist activists were 'wolves in sheep's clothing', with the goal of making Malaysia a republic.

During the ceremony in Setiawangsa, he received the 'Perkasa Top Award', previously awarded to former Prime Minister Mahathir Mohamad and former Chief of Malaysian Armed Forces (ATM) Ibrahim Ismail.

== Honours ==
- Malaysia
  - Commander of the Order of the Defender of the Realm (PMN) – Tan Sri (1995)
  - Commander of the Order of Loyalty to the Crown of Malaysia (PSM) – Tan Sri (1990)
  - Officer of the Order of the Defender of the Realm (KMN) (1982)
- Malacca
  - Companion Class I of the Exalted Order of Malacca (DMSM) – Datuk (1986)
- Pahang
  - Knight Grand Companion of the Order of the Crown of Pahang (SIMP) – formerly Dato', now Dato' Indera (1993)
- Sabah
  - Grand Commander of the Order of Kinabalu (SPDK) – Datuk Seri Panglima (1996)
- Selangor
  - Knight Commander of the Order of the Crown of Selangor (DPMS) – Dato' (1994)

=== Foreign Honours ===
- Singapore
  - Recipient of the Darjah Utama Bakti Cemerlang (DUBC) (1996)
