= Khalid Abu Bakar =

Malaysian police officer

Yang Berbahagia Tan Sri Dato' Seri Khalid Abu Bakar PMN SSTM SJMK SPTS SPDK PSM SPMP SSAP SSIS DHMS DCSM DPMS DSAP DIMP JMN SAP DPKT
- خالد أبو بکر
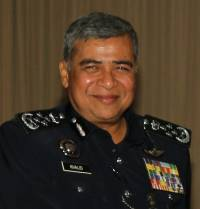

Chairman of Prasarana Malaysia
- In office 4 September 2017 – 17 July 2018
- Minister: Najib Razak; Lim Guan Eng
- Preceded by: Ismail Adam
- Succeeded by: Zaharah Ibrahim

10th Inspector-General of Police (Malaysia)
- In office 17 May 2013 – 4 September 2017
- Monarchs: Abdul Halim; Muhammad V
- Prime Minister: Najib Razak
- Minister: Hishammuddin Hussein; Ahmad Zahid Hamidi
- Preceded by: Ismail Omar
- Succeeded by: Mohamad Fuzi Harun

Deputy Inspector-General of Police (Malaysia)
- In office 14 April 2010 – 16 May 2013
- Nominated by: Najib Razak
- Appointed by: Mizan Zainal Abidin
- Monarchs: Mizan Zainal Abidin; Abdul Halim
- Prime Minister: Najib Razak
- Preceded by: Hussin Ismail
- Succeeded by: Mohd Bakri Mohd Zinin

Personal details
- Born: 5 September 1957 (age 69) Seremban, Negeri Sembilan, Federation of Malaya (now Malaysia)
- Citizenship: Malaysian
- Spouse: Imran binti Ibrahim Bil
- Children: 4
- Education: International Islamic University Malaysia
- Occupation: Police officer

Khalid bin Abu Bakar (born 5 September 1957) is a retired Malaysian police officer who served as the 10th Inspector-General of Police of Malaysia (IGP), succeeding Ismail Omar. He retired as IGP on 4 September 2017 and was succeeded by Mohamad Fuzi Harun. A day after he retired from the police, Khalid was appointed chairman of Prasarana Malaysia by the Prime Minister of Malaysia, Najib Razak.

Shortly after the fall of Najib Razak's administration in the May 2018 Malaysian general election, Khalid was put on a foreign-travel ban blacklist by the new administration, together with 11 others, in relation to investigations into the 1Malaysia Development Berhad scandal. And on 17 July 2018, Khalid resigned as chairman of Prasarana Malaysia without citing any reason. He's now become film executive producer for Multimedia Entertainment.

== Educational background ==
He holds a Bachelor of Law degree from International Islamic University Malaysia which he earned in 1995 after being selected as one amongst 15 junior police officers to further their education through a part-time degree program.

== Career ==
Khalid began his career in the Royal Malaysian Police on 5 December 1975, aged 18, when he enrolled as an Inspector in Training at the Police Training Centre of Malaysia in Kuala Lumpur. He was promoted to Assistant Superintendent of Police on 1 December 1986. Khalid also attended International Senior Police Officers' Command Course in 2000.

He served as the Deputy Inspector-General of Police of Malaysia before being promoted to the top job in 2013.

As the IGP, Khalid was known for his extensive use of Twitter for public communication including issuing informal warnings via Twitter to the Malaysian public. This earned him criticism from civil rights activists who accused him of using Twitter to curb free speech.

In April 2018, Khalid was found liable for the defamation of Nurul Izzah Anwar, vice-president of the opposition People's Justice Party, for portraying her as a traitor in 2013 during statements made as IGP about the Lahad Datu standoff.

Khalid was appointed the new Prasarana Malaysia Bhd (Prasarana) group chairman on 5 September 2017, a day after he officially handed over his police command. Additionally, on the same day, Prime Minister Najib appointed Khalid as his special envoy in matters relating to combating terrorism, extremism and human trafficking on the international stage.

He resigned as chairman of Prasarana on 17 July 2018, without citing reasons. He's currently become Multimedia Entertainment's chairman and become executive producer for them.

== Controversies ==
In 2018, Khalid together with Tan Sri Mohamed Apandi Ali, Mohd Irwan Serigar Abdullah and Tan Sri Dzulkifli Ahmad has been banned from travelling abroad due to 1MDB scandal. He was originally not pressured to be investigated by Tan Sri Mohamad Fuzi Harun, his predecessor.

In 2021, Khalid was subjected by former Prime Minister, Mahathir Mohamad due to slander after an article uploaded by The Malaysian Insight titled "Khalid Abu Bakar Bocor Rancangan pada Najib" (lit. 'Khalid Abu Bakar leaked information on Najib'). Mahathir told media that he want to meet Khalid in the court together with Khalid's lawyer.

== Personal life ==
Khalid marries Imran binti Ibrahim Bil and has 4 children. His son, Khairil Amri married to singer-actress Wanna Ali on 9 February 2025.

== Filmography ==
As executive producer unless otherwise noted
Year	Title	Notes
2021	Rumah Maduku Berhantu	
2022	Air Force The Movie: Danger Close	
2022	Possessed	
2022	Biko	
2024	Legasi Bomba: The Movie †	Post-production
2024	Perisik †	Post-production
2024	Takluk: Inspirasi Lahad Datu †	Post-production

Key
†	Denotes films that have not yet been released

== Honours ==
- Malaysia
  - Commander of the Order of the Defender of the Realm (PMN) – Tan Sri (2014)
  - Commander of the Order of Loyalty to the Crown of Malaysia (PSM) – Tan Sri (2012)
  - Companion of the Order of the Defender of the Realm (JMN) (2009)
  - Recipient of the General Service Medal (PPA)
  - Recipient of the National Sovereignty Medal (PKN) (2014)
  - Recipient of the 10th Yang di-Pertuan Agong Installation Medal
  - Recipient of the 14th Yang di-Pertuan Agong Installation Medal
- Royal Malaysia Police
  - Courageous Commander of the Most Gallant Police Order (PGPP) (2011)
  - Loyal Commander of the Most Gallant Police Order (PSPP)
  - Warrior of the Most Gallant Police Order (PPP)
  - Recipient of the Presentation of Police Colours Medal
- Kedah
  - Knight Commander of the Order of Loyalty to Sultan Abdul Halim Mu'adzam Shah (DHMS) – Dato' Paduka (2012)
- Kelantan
  - Knight Grand Commander of the Order of the Life of the Crown of Kelantan (SJMK) – Dato' (2011)
- Malacca
  - Knight Commander of the Exalted Order of Malacca (DCSM) – Datuk Wira (2013)
- Negeri Sembilan
  - Knight Grand Companion of the Order of Loyalty to Tuanku Muhriz (SSTM) – Dato' Seri (2013)
- Pahang
  - Knight Grand Companion of the Order of Sultan Ahmad Shah of Pahang (SSAP) – Dato' Sri (2010)
  - Knight Companion of the Order of Sultan Ahmad Shah of Pahang (DSAP) – Dato' (2006)
  - Knight Companion of the Order of the Crown of Pahang (DIMP) – Dato' (2004)
  - Companion of the Order of Sultan Ahmad Shah of Pahang (SAP)
- Perak
  - Knight Grand Commander of the Order of Taming Sari (SPTS) – Dato' Seri Panglima (2014)
- Perlis
  - Knight Grand Commander of the Order of the Crown of Perlis (SPMP) – Dato' Seri (2014)
- Sabah
  - Grand Commander of the Order of Kinabalu (SPDK) – Datuk Seri Panglima (2013)
- Selangor
  - Knight Grand Companion of the Order of Sultan Sharafuddin Idris Shah (SSIS) – Dato' Setia (2011)
  - Knight Commander of the Order of the Crown of Selangor (DPMS) – Dato' (2008)

=== Foreign honours ===
- Singapore
  - Recipient of the Darjah Utama Bakti Cemerlang (DUBC) (2014)
- Thailand
  - Knight Grand Cross of the Order of the Crown of Thailand (GCCT) (2014)
- Brunei
  - First Class of the Order of Paduka Keberanian Laila Terbilang (DPKT) – Dato Paduka Seri (2016)
- Indonesia
  - Star of Bhayangkara 1st Class (2018)
