= Ismail Omar =

Malaysian police officer

Yang Berbahagia Tan Sri Ismail Omar PMN PSM SPMS SPMP SPSK SSDK SSAP DPPN SPDK SUMW SPMT SPTS DCSM DSDK
- اسماعيل عمر

16th Ambassador of Malaysia to France
- In office 1 October 2013 – 1 October 2015
- Monarch: Abdul Halim
- Prime Minister: Najib Razak
- Preceded by: Abdul Aziz Zainal
- Succeeded by: Ibrahim Abdullah

9th Inspector-General of Police (Malaysia)
- In office 13 September 2010 – 16 May 2013
- Monarchs: Mizan Zainal Abidin; Abdul Halim
- Prime Minister: Najib Razak
- Minister: Hishammuddin Hussein
- Preceded by: Musa Hassan
- Succeeded by: Khalid Abu Bakar

Personal details
- Born: 17 May 1953 (age 73) Kulim, Kedah, Federation of Malaya (now Malaysia)
- Citizenship: Malaysian
- Education: St. Michael's Institution; International Islamic University Malaysia
- Occupation: Police officer, diplomat

Ismail bin Omar (Jawi: اسماعيل بن عمر; born 17 May 1953) is a Malaysian diplomat and retired police officer who served as the ninth Inspector-General of Police of Malaysia succeeding Tan Sri Musa Hassan and was succeeded by Khalid Abu Bakar. On 13 September 2013, he was appointed the Ambassador of Malaysia to France by Yang di-Pertuan Agong Tuanku Abdul Halim Mu'adzam Shah.

== Educational background ==
He holds a law degree from International Islamic University Malaysia, he then furthered his studies at the Kuala Kubu Bahru Police College. In 1971, he was commissioned as the Probationary Inspector.

== Career ==
Ismail was a Criminal Investigation Officer at the Seremban District Police Headquarters in 1972 and Kuala Pilah District Police Headquarters in 1975 before he was posted to Ipoh District Police Headquarters in 1977 as a Traffic Investigation Officer, and was posted to Kerian District Police Headquarters in 1978 as a Criminal Investigation Officer. In 1980, he served as Officer in Charge of Taiping Training Area Training Center.

In 1983, he was promoted to Assistant Superintendent of Police and posted to the Federal Police Headquarters as one of the officers-in-charge in disciplinary investigations. He was made prosecuting officer in Ipoh in 1994 before being promoted as Seberang Perai Tengah District Police Chief in 1996.

In 1999, he was promoted to rank of Assistant Commissioner of Police and was made head of the CID Legal and Prosecution Affairs in Bukit Aman. He then moved up the ranks and was made Assistant CID Director in 2004 with the rank of Senior Assistant Commissioner of Police II.

He was promoted to deputy director of Narcotics Crime Investigation Department in 2005 with the rank of Senior Assistant Commissioner of Police I. In 2005, he was promoted to Deputy Commissioner of Police and assumed the role of Selangor Police Chief.

Later, he was promoted and made director of Management Department with the rank of Commissioner of Police. Hardly a year later, he was appointed Deputy Inspector General of Police.

On 13 September 2010, the monarch appointed him as the Malaysian IGP.

== After Retirement ==
Ismail was appointed Malaysia's Ambassador to France in 2013–2015. He later joined NSTP Berhad as chairman in 2017.

== Honours ==
=== Honours of Malaysia ===
- Malaysia
  - Commander of the Order of the Defender of the Realm (PMN) – Tan Sri (2011)
  - Commander of the Order of Loyalty to the Crown of Malaysia (PSM) – Tan Sri (2008)
- Federal Territory (Malaysia)
  - Grand Knight of the Order of the Territorial Crown (SUMW) – Datuk Seri Utama (2012) (Note: scheduled conferred in 2012 but Ismail Omar was on a working trip to foreign country so the honour was officially conferred in 2013)
- Kedah
  - Knight Grand Companion of the Order of Loyalty to the Royal House of Kedah (SSDK) – Dato' Seri (2008)
  - Knight Companion of the Order of Loyalty to the Royal House of Kedah (DSDK) – Dato' (2006)
- Kelantan
  - Knight Grand Commander of the Order of the Loyalty to the Crown of Kelantan (SPSK) – Dato' (2009)
- Malacca
  - Knight Commander of the Exalted Order of Malacca (DCSM) – Datuk Wira (2012)
- Pahang
  - Knight Grand Companion of the Order of Sultan Ahmad Shah of Pahang (SSAP) – Dato' Sri (2008)
- Penang
  - Knight Commander of the Order of the Defender of State (DPPN) – Dato' Seri (2011)
- Perak
  - Knight Grand Commander of the Order of Taming Sari (SPTS) – Dato' Seri Panglima (2010)
- Perlis
  - Knight Grand Commander of the Order of the Crown of Perlis (SPMP) – Dato' Seri (2012)
- Sabah
  - Grand Commander of the Order of Kinabalu (SPDK) – Datuk Seri Panglima (2013)
- Selangor
  - Knight Grand Commander of the Order of the Crown of Selangor (SPMS) – Dato' Seri (2010)
- Terengganu
  - Knight Grand Commander of the Order of the Crown of Terengganu (SPMT) – Dato' (2013)

=== Foreign Honours ===
- Thailand
  - Knight Grand Cross of the Order of the White Elephant (PCh (KCE)) (2014)
  - Knight Grand Cross of the Order of the Crown of Thailand (PM GCCT)) (2011)
- Singapore:
  - Darjah Utama Bakti Cemerlang (DUBC; 2013)
