= Inspector-General of Police (Malaysia) =

Highest-ranking police officer in Malaysia

Inspector-General of Royal Malaysia Police
- Ketua Polis Negara كتوا ڤوليس نڬارا
- Logo of the Royal Malaysia Police
- Incumbent; Mohd Khalid Ismail since 23 June 2025
- Royal Malaysia Police
- Style: Yang Berbahagia
- Type: Inspector-general of police
- Abbreviation: IGP
- Member of: Police Force Commission
- Reports to: Minister of Home Affairs
- Seat: Jalan Bukit Aman, Tasik Perdana, 50560 Kuala Lumpur, Wilayah Persekutuan Kuala Lumpur, Malaysia
- Appointer: Yang di-Pertuan Agong; on the advice of Prime Minister
- Term length: mandatory retirement age at 60
- Constituting instrument: Article 140 (4)(5)
- Precursor: Commissioner of Police of Malaya
- Formation: 1963
- First holder: Claude Fenner
- Deputy: Deputy Inspector-General of Police

The Inspector-General of Police (abbreviation: IGP; Malay: Ketua Polis Negara — KPN), also known as the Chief of Police, is the professional head and highest-ranking police officer of the Royal Malaysia Police (RMP; Malay: Polis Diraja Malaysia — PDRM). He is assisted by the Deputy Inspector-General of Police (DIG or DIGP; Malay: Timbalan Ketua Polis Negara — TKPN), he reports to the Minister of Home Affairs. The IGP is based at Bukit Aman, Kuala Lumpur which is the Headquarters of the RMP.

The current IGP is Mohd Khalid Ismail – having succeeded his predecessor, Razarudin Husain in June 2025.

Inspectors-General of Police currently are mandated to retire once reach the age of 60, but may be extended upon exceptional circumstances.

When the Inspector-General of Police is unable to perform his duties, is absent from work, or is on vacation, the Deputy Inspector-General of Police shall assume the duties of the Inspector-General of Police.

== History ==
During the Malacca Sultanate (1400–1511), the position that resembles modern chief of police is the Temenggong ('Chief of Public Security'). After the fall of Malacca and up to the 17th century, Malaya was under several western powers including Portugal, the Netherlands and Britain, and the task of securing public safety in Malaya fell to these nations' militaries.

In 1807, the British administration in Malaya has approved the Charter of Justice. Under the Charter, British administrations allowed a police force comprising locals to be formed. Penang is the first to establish their police force and James Carnegy was appointed to be the first Sheriff of Prince of Wales Islands (the then name for Penang). Malacca is the second state to establish its police force which is in 1827 and other states followed — Johor in 1882, the Federated Malay States in 1896, Kedah and Kelantan in 1909 and Terengganu in 1914. Captain Charles Henry Syers who was the Selangor Commissioner of Police was appointed to be the first Federated Malay States' Commissioner of Police. For North Borneo, Sarawak established its police force namely the Sarawak Rangers, in 1862, and Sabah in 1882.

After World War II and the Japanese occupation of Malaya, the British administration has merged all police forces in Malaya into Malayan Union Police and based in Kuala Lumpur. After the independence of Malaya, the name was changed to Federation of Malaya Police. On 16 September 1963, Sabah, Sarawak and Singapore merged with Federation of Malaya and formed Malaysia. The name of the police force once again changed to its current name — the Royal Malaysia Police. Commissioner Claude Fenner, who was the Federation of Malaya's Commissioner of Police was appointed to become the first Inspector-General of Police of Malaysia.

== Appointment ==
According to the Federal Constitution, the Yang di-Pertuan Agong shall first appoint an inspector-general of police to preside over the police force according to Article 140 (4)(5) with the consent of His Majesty with the Prime Minister's advice on the Police Force Commission's certificate. This person must be a Malaysian citizen.

== Coat of Arms and Clothing ==
The IGP's shirt is dark blue same as other police officers, with a crown, a double keris Golden Harvest and four stars as shoulder insignia. The collar badge has a leaf pattern. The police cap has white double rice ears decoration.

== List of the Inspectors-General of Police ==
Since 1958, a total of 15 Inspectors-General of Police have been appointed. The list is as follows:

| No. | Portrait | Inspector-General of Police | Term of office | | | Minister of Home Affairs |
| No. | Portrait | Inspector-General of Police | Took office | Left office | Time in office | Minister of Home Affairs |
|---|---|---|---|---|---|---|
| 1. | | Tan Sri Sir; Claude Fenner (1916–1978) | 18 September 1958 | 28 February 1966 | 7 years, 164 days | Suleiman Abdul Rahman (31 August 1957 – 1959); Leong Yew Koh (1959 – 12 January 1963); Ismail Abdul Rahman (1 August 1962 – 1965) |
| 2. | | Tun; Mohamed Salleh Ismael (1917–1973) | 29 March 1966 | 31 January 1973 | 6 years, 309 days | Ismail Abdul Rahman (1965 – 1 June 1967); Abdul Razak Hussein (1 June 1967 – 20 May 1969); Ismail Abdul Rahman (20 May 1969 – 2 August 1973) |
| 3. | | Tan Sri; Abdul Rahman Hashim (1925–1974) | 1 February 1973 | 7 June 1974 | 1 year, 127 days | Ismail Abdul Rahman (20 May 1969 – 2 August 1973); Ghazali Shafie (13 August 1973 – 16 July 1981) |
| 4. | | Tun; Mohammed Hanif Omar (1939–2024) | 8 June 1974 | 15 January 1994 | 19 years, 222 days | Ghazali Shafie (13 August 1973 – 16 July 1981); Musa Hitam (17 July 1981 – 16 March 1986); Mahathir Mohamad (17 March 1986 – 10 January 1999) |
| 5. | | Tan Sri; Abdul Rahim Mohd Noor (b.1943) | 16 January 1994 | 7 January 1999 | 4 years, 357 days | Mahathir Mohamad (17 March 1986 – 10 January 1999) |
| 6. | | Tan Sri; Norian Mai (b.1946) | 8 January 1999 | 4 November 2003 | 4 years, 301 days | Mahathir Mohamad (17 March 1986 – 10 January 1999); Abdullah Ahmad Badawi (14 January 1999 – 27 March 2004) |
| 7. | | Tan Sri; Mohd Bakri Omar (1948–2014) | 5 November 2003 | 11 September 2006 | 2 years, 311 days | Abdullah Ahmad Badawi (14 January 1999 – 27 March 2004); Azmi Khalid (27 March 2004 – 13 February 2006); Mohd Radzi Sheikh Ahmad (14 February 2006 – 17 March 2008) |
| 8. | | Tan Sri; Musa Hassan (b.1951) | 12 September 2006 | 12 September 2010 | 4 years, 0 days | Mohd Radzi Sheikh Ahmad (14 February 2006 – 17 March 2008); Syed Hamid Albar (18 March 2008 – 9 April 2009); Hishammuddin Hussein (10 April 2009 – 20 April 2013) |
| 9. | | Tan Sri Haji; Ismail Omar (b.1953) | 13 September 2010 | 16 May 2013 | 2 years, 246 days | Hishammuddin Hussein (10 April 2009 – 20 April 2013); Ahmad Zahid Hamidi (16 May 2013 – 9 May 2018) |
| 10. | | Tan Sri Dato' Sri; Khalid Abu Bakar (b.1957) | 17 May 2013 | 3 September 2017 | 4 years, 110 days | Ahmad Zahid Hamidi (16 May 2013 – 9 May 2018) |
| 11. | | Tan Sri Dato' Sri; Mohamad Fuzi Harun (b.1959) | 4 September 2017 | 3 May 2019 | 1 year, 242 days | Ahmad Zahid Hamidi (16 May 2013 – 9 May 2018); Muhyiddin Yassin (21 May 2018 – 24 February 2020) |
| 12. | | Tan Sri Dato' Seri; Abdul Hamid Bador (b.1958) | 4 May 2019 | 3 May 2021 | 2 years, 0 days | Muhyiddin Yassin (21 May 2018 – 24 February 2020); Hamzah Zainudin (10 March 2020 – 24 November 2022) |
| 13. | | Tan Sri; Acryl Sani Abdullah Sani (b.1961) | 4 May 2021 | 22 June 2023 | 2 years, 50 days | Hamzah Zainudin (10 March 2020 – 24 November 2022); Saifuddin Nasution Ismail (since 3 December 2022) |
| 14. | | Tan Sri; Razarudin Husain (b.1963) | 23 June 2023 | 22 June 2025 | 2 years, 0 days | Saifuddin Nasution Ismail (since 3 December 2022) |
| 15. | | Tan Sri Dato' Seri Haji; Mohd Khalid Ismail (b.1965) | 23 June 2025 | Incumbent | 1 year, 85 days | Saifuddin Nasution Ismail (since 3 December 2022) |

=== Living former Inspectors-General ===
| Name | Term of office | Date of birth |
|---|---|---|
| Abdul Rahim Mohd Noor | 1994–1999 | 6 June 1943 (age 83) |
| Norian Mai | 1999–2003 | 5 November 1946 (age 79) |
| Musa Hassan | 2006–2010 | 13 September 1951 (age 75) |
| Ismail Omar | 2010–2013 | 17 May 1953 (age 73) |
| Khalid Abu Bakar | 2013–2017 | 5 September 1957 (age 69) |
| Mohamad Fuzi Harun | 2017–2019 | 4 May 1959 (age 67) |
| Abdul Hamid Bador | 2019–2021 | 7 August 1958 (age 68) |
| Acryl Sani Abdullah Sani | 2021–2023 | 3 October 1961 (age 64) |
| Razarudin Husain | 2023–2025 | 15 March 1963 (age 63) |
