= Order of the Crown of Pahang =

Order of chivalry

Order of the Crown of Pahang Darjah Kebesaran Mahkota Pahang

Awarded by the Sultan of Pahang
- Type: Order
- Founded: 27 December 1968
- Royal house: House of Bendahara
- Status: Currently constituted
- Founder: Sultan Abu Bakar Ri’ayatuddin Al-Mu’azzam Shah
- Sovereign: Al-Sultan Abdullah Ri'ayatuddin Al-Mustafa Billah Shah
- Classes: Grand Companion (SIMP); Companion (DIMP); Officer (SMP); Member (AMP)
- Post-nominals: S.I.M.P.; D.I.M.P.; S.M.P.; A.M.P.

Precedence
- Next (higher): Order of Sultan Ahmad Shah of Pahang
- Next (lower): Distinguished Service Medal
- Grand Companion Companion Officer Member

The Esteemed Order of the Crown of Pahang (Malay: Darjah Kebesaran Mahkota Pahang Yang Amat Mulia) is a knighthood order of the Sultanate of Pahang.

== History ==
The order was founded by Sultan Abu Bakar on 27 December 1968. It is awarded to individuals who have rendered meritorious service to the State.

== Classes ==
There are four classes of the order:

- Grand Companion of the Order of the Crown of Pahang (post-nominal letters : SIMP)
- Companion of the Order of the Crown of Pahang (post-nominal letters : DIMP)
- Officer of the Order of the Crown of Pahang (post-nominal letters : SMP)
- Member of the Order of the Crown of Pahang (post-nominal letters : AMP)

== Recipients ==
=== Grand Companion (S.I.M.P.) ===
The grand Companions receives the title Dato' Indera and his wife Datin Indera

- 1972: Ghazali Shafie
- 1972: Abdul Rahman Ya'kub
- 1973: Rahah Noah
- 1975: Hussein Onn
- 1981: Mohd Ghazali Mohd Seth
- 1981: Mohammed Hanif Omar
- 1985: Abdul Hamid Omar
- 1985: Mohd Khalil Yaakob
- 1985: Kurnia Bija Sura Low Keng Huat
- 1985: Mohamed Al-Hamad Al-Shubaili
- 1985: Mohd. Amin bin Osman
- 1985: Penggawa Ungku Tan Sri Dato' Nasaruddin bin Mohammad
- 1985: Sulaiman Daud
- 1986: A.P. Arumugam
- 1986: Chan Siang Sun
- 1986: Tengku Seri Wangsa Raja Tengku Mohd Salim bin Tengku Omar
- 1987: Ahmad Razali Mohd Ali
- 1987: Lim Goh Tong
- 1987: Mohamed Rahmat
- 1988: Elyas Omar
- 1988: Mohamed Hashim Mohd Ali
- 1988: Tengku Nong Fatimah binti Sultan Haji Ahmad Shah
- 1988: Sabbaruddin Chik
- 1988: Tengku Panglima Besar Pahang Tengku Abdul Khalid ibni Almarhum Sultan Abdullah
- 1988: Tengku Panglima Perang Pahang Haji Tengku Ismail bin Tengku Muhamad
- 1988: Wong Nyuk Shing @ Wong Teck Tsin
- 1989: Munir Abu Bakar
- 1989: Vincent Tan
- 1989: Lim Ah Lek
- 1990: Abdul Aziz Abdul Rahman
- 1990: Ahmad Sarji Abdul Hamid
- 1990: Brian H.E. Cristopher
- 1990: Jaffar bin Hussein
- 1990: Dr. Joao Havelange
- 1990: Lin Tung - Kuo
- 1990: Mohd Yunus Mohd Tasi
- 1990: Dr. Richard Wolffe Emanuel
- 1990: Hajah Tengku Shahariah binti Sultan Haji Ahmad Shah
- 1990: Tan Beng Tong
- 1990: Tengku Panglima Perang Tengku Abdul Aziz ibni Al Marhum Sultan Abu Bakar
- 1990: Wan Sidek bin Haji Wan Abdu Rahman
- 1993: Abdul Rahim Mohd Noor
- 1996: Che Md Noor Mat Arshad
- 1997: Norian Mai
- 2004: Nazir Razak
- 2007: Koh Hong Sun
- 2007: Abdul Razak Bokhari
- 2008: Mohamad Fuzi Harun
- 2023: Tengku Fahd Mu'adzam

=== Companions (D.I.M.P.) ===
The Companions receives the title Dato' and his wife Datin

- 1970: Ghazali Shafie
- 1971: Ibrahim Ismail
- 1985: Abdul Rahman bin Hamzah
- 1985: Bahari bin Tan Sri Dato' Haji Yahaya
- 1985: Dusuki bin Haji Ahmad
- 1985: Ho Thian Hock
- 1985: Ismail bin Dato' Abdullah
- 1985: Khairi bin Haji Mohamad
- 1985: Long Ahmad Zainalabidin bin Mohd. Tahir
- 1985: Mansor Mohd Noor
- 1985: Murad Hashim
- 1985: Nik Abdul Rashid bin Nik Abdul Majid
- 1990: Ismail Omar
- 1996: Gopal Sri Ram
- 1998: Jamil Osman
- 2004: Abdul Aziz bin Kasim
- 2004: Abdul Rahim Jaafar
- 2004: Hadi Ho Abdullah
- 2004: Khalid Abu Bakar
- 2004: Koh Hong Sun
- 2004: Mohamad Fuzi Harun
- 2006: Acryl Sani Abdullah Sani
- 2006: Mohd Mokhtar Mohd Shariff
- 2006: Mohd Shukri Dahlan
- 2006: Jamil Osman
- 2007: Abdul Hamid Bador
- 2008: David Arumugam
- 2010: Mazlan Lazim
- 2011: Huzir Mohamed
- 2014: Law Hong Soon
- 2014: Fatimah Ghazali
- 2014: Johari Harun
- 2015: Zahari Sarip
- 2016: Amizar Abu Adam
- 2020: Shahrul Nizam Abdul Aziz
- 2022: Izwan Hasli bin Mohd Ibrahim

== See also ==
- Orders, decorations, and medals of the Malaysian states and federal territories#Pahang
- Orders, decorations, and medals of Pahang
- List of post-nominal letters (Pahang)
