= Henry Dunant Medal =

Red Cross award

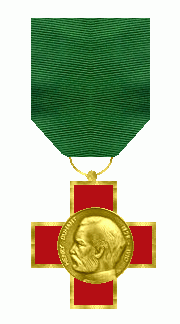
- Obverse of the medal
- Awarded for: "Outstanding services and acts of great devotion, mainly of international significance, to the cause of the International Red Cross and Red Crescent Movement"
- Description: Red cross with bearing the profile of Henry Dunant in relief, attached to a green ribbon
- Presented by: Heads of State or Heads of Red Cross National Societies
- Status: Currently awarded
- Established: 1965
- First award: 1969

Highlights
- Total recipients: 153

The Henry Dunant Medal is the highest award of the Red Cross Movement. It is named after Henry Dunant, the founder of the Red Cross Movement. The medal is presented every two years by the Standing Commission of the Red Cross and Red Crescent. This body represents the International Committee of the Red Cross, the International Federation of Red Cross and Red Crescent Societies and the various National Red Cross and Red Crescent Societies.

== History ==
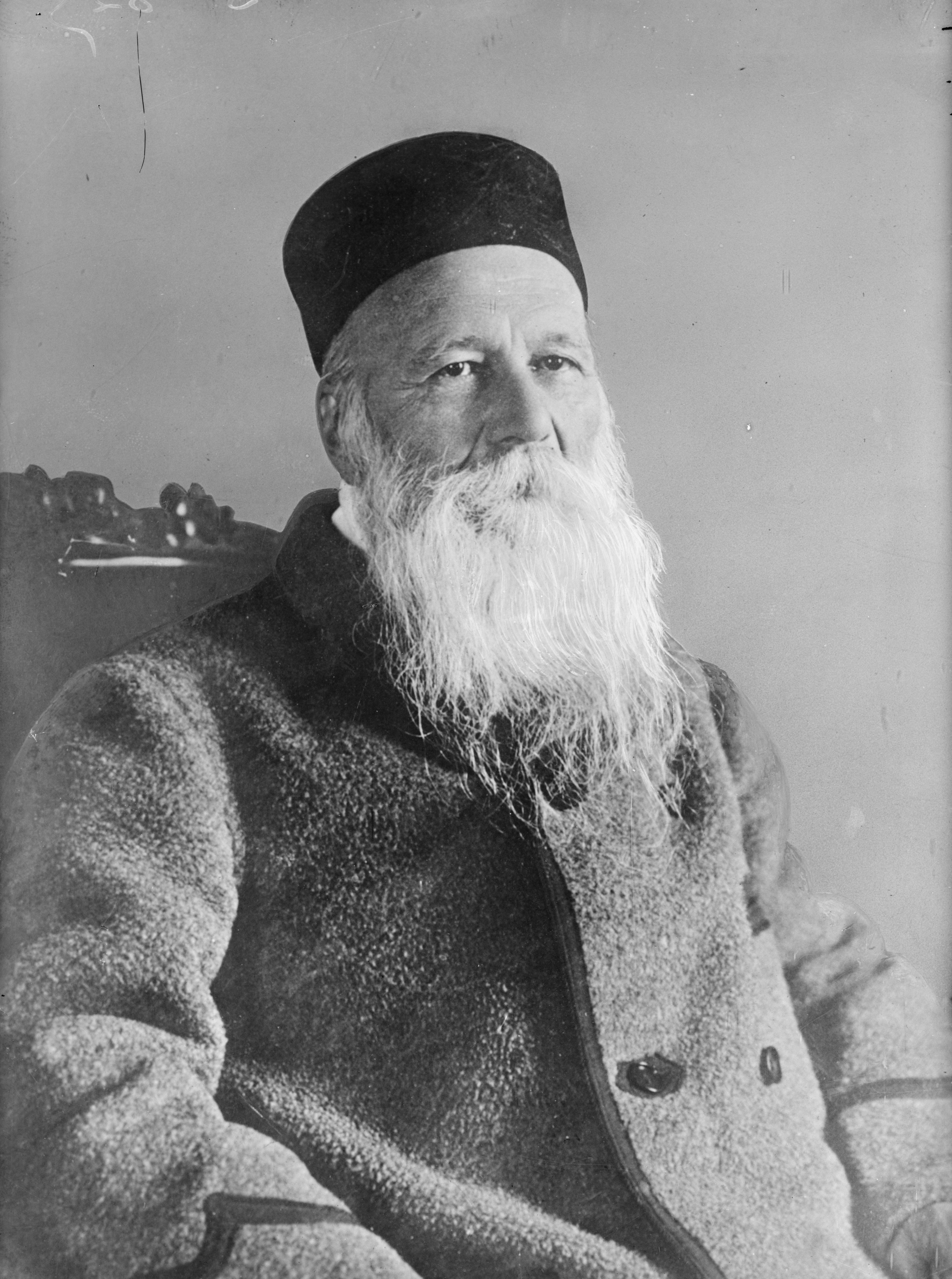
Henri Dunant, 1901

In 1963, the idea of creating a medal named in honour of the founder of the International Red Cross was submitted to and approved by the Council of Delegates. This coincided with the 100th anniversary of the Red Cross. In 1965, through the generosity of the Australian Red Cross, the Henry Dunant Medal was established by the International Red Cross Conference in Vienna. The first medals were presented in 1969.

== Criteria ==
The Henry Dunant Medal is awarded by the Standing Commission of the Red Cross and Red Crescent. This body, representing all of the groups making up the Red Cross Movement, makes five awards of the medal every two years. These limits are placed to ensure the value and prestige of the medal as the highest honour the Red Cross Movement can bestow upon one of its members.

The medal is awarded to, "recognise and reward outstanding services and acts of great devotion, mainly of international significance, to the cause of the Red Cross/Red Crescent by any of its members". The Standing Commission gives special weight to the international significance of the a potential recipients' acts or service. If the international dimension is lacking, the Commission would likely not select the individual concerned. Though their acts of service may be great, but would likely best be recognized by their National Society.

Regulations still allow for the posthumous award of the medal. However, the various groups of the movement have been encouraged to create other means of recognition for those killed in service to the Red Cross. All posthumous nominations for the Henry Dunant Medal should be for, "truly exceptional cases."

== Description ==
The Henry Dunant Medal is in the shape of a Geneva or Greek cross. The arms of the cross are colored with red enamel. In the center of the cross is a circular bronze medallion bearing effigy of Henry Dunant, facing left. Circumscribed around the effigy are the words HENRY DUNANT 1828-1910. The reverse of the medal is plain. To the top arm of the cross is attached a loop for ribbon suspension.

The ribbon is depicted as either solid green, or green with red edges.

== Recipients ==
Name	Nationality	Gender	Year	Notes
Frantisek Janouch	Czechoslovakia	Male	1969	
Dragan Hercog	Serbia	Male	1969	
Robert Carlson	Sweden	Male	1969	
Pierre-André Tacier	Switzerland	Male	1969	First living recipient of the medal, former ICRC Delegate.
Sachiko Hashimoto	Japan	Female	1971	
André François-Poncet	France	Male	1971	
Katalin Durgo	Hungary	Female	1971	
John McAulay	Canada	Male	1971	
Pavle Gregoric	Croatia	Male	1971	
John MacAulay		Male	1973	Chairman of the International Federation of Red Cross and Red Crescent Societies from 1959 to 1965, first Canadian recipient.
Georgy Miterev	Russia	Male	1975	
Angela Countess of Limerick	United Kingdom	Female	1975	
Pierre Boissier	Switzerland	Male	1975	
Ferer Segura	Mexico	Male	1975	
Irena Domanska	Poland	Female	1975	
Duke of Hernani	Spain	Male	1977	
Baroness Mallet	France	Female	1977	
Sai Aung Hlaing Myint	Myanmar	Male	1977	A member of Myanmar Red Cross Society, for saving a soldier whose car fell into the Ayeyarwady River which was icy cold at that time.
Countess Etta Waldersee	Germany	Female	1977	
Sir Geoffrey Newman-Morris	Australia	Male	1979	
Alan Bièri	Switzerland	Male	1979	
André Tièche	Switzerland	Male	1979	
Charles Chatora	Zimbabwe	Male	1979	
George Aitken	Canada	Male	1979	
José Dolores Estrada-Granizo	Nicaragua	Male	1979	
Louis Gaulis	Switzerland	Male	1979	
Marvin Alberto Flores-Salazar	Nicaragua	Male	1979	
Leslie Barry	Ireland	Female	1979	
Louise Henriette van Overeem-Ziegenhardt	Netherlands	Female	1979	
Krista Djordjevic	Croatia	Female	1981	
Ismael Reyes Icabalceta	Nicaragua	Male	1981	
Melchior Borsinger	Switzerland	Male	1981	
Alexandra Issa-el-Khoury	Lebanon	Female	1981	
Werner Ludwig	Germany	Male	1983	
Abdul Aziz Mudarris	Saudi Arabia	Male	1983	Established the Saudi Red Crescent in 1962, he was the first President of the Saudi Red Crescent
Bagus Rudiono	Indonesia	Male	1983	
Mariano Bahamonde Ruiz	Chile	Male	1983	
Hans Christian Bennetzen	Denmark	Male	1983	
John Henry Felix	United States	Male	1983	
Walter Bargatzky	Germany	Male	1983	
Olga Milosevic	Serbia	Female	1985	
Tom Willmott Sloper	Brazil	Male	1985	
Marie Josée Burnier	Switzerland	Female	1987	
Anton Schlogel	Germany	Male	1987	
Kai Warras	Finland	Male	1987	
Princess Gina of Liechtenstein	Liechtenstein	Female	1987	
Joseph Adefarasin	Nigeria	Male	1987	Former President of the Red Cross League, first Nigerian recipient.
Enrique de la Mata	Spain	Male	1987	
Juan José Vega Aguiar	Cuba	Male	1987	
Onni Nishannen	Ethiopia/Sweden	Male	1987	
Gejza Mencer	Czechoslovakia	Male	1989	
Ali Fourati	Tunisia	Male	1989	
George Elsey	United States	Male	1989	
Leon George Stubbings	Australia	Male	1989	
Michael Egabu	Uganda	Male	1989	
ML Kashetra Snidvongs	Thailand	Male	1989	
Kamar Kazoon Choura	Syria	Female	1991	
Baron Kraijenhoff	Netherlands	Male	1991	
Janos Hantos	Hungary	Male	1991	
Alexandre Hay	Switzerland	Male	1991	
Carlos Alberto Vera Martinez	Paraguay	Male	1991	
Faqir Yar	Afghanistan	Male	1991	
Graeme Whyte	New Zealand	Male	1991	
Juanito Patong	Philippines	Male	1991	
Peter Altwegg	Switzerland	Male	1991	
Walter Berweger	Switzerland	Male	1991	
William Cassis	Lebanon	Male	1991	
Zamany Mohammed Osman	Afghanistan	Male	1991	
Susanne Buser	Switzerland	Female	1993	
Jock Sutherland	New Zealand	Male	1993	
Pedro José Manrique Lander	Venezuela	Male	1993	
Ahmed Abu-Ghoura / Dr. Ahmad Abu Goura	Jordan	Male	1993	President of the Jordanian Red Crescent Society from 1964 to 1993.
Abdul Qadar	Pakistan	Male	1993	
Arthur Brian Hodgson	United Kingdom	Male	1993	
Frédéric Maurice	Switzerland	Male	1993	
Jon Karlsson	Iceland	Male	1993	
Kurt Lustenberger	Switzerland	Male	1993	
Michel Kuhn	Switzerland	Male	1993	
Mohammed Zaboor	Afghanistan	Male	1993	
Win van Boxelaere	Belgium	Male	1993	
Maria Luisa Torres de la Cruz	Chile	Female	1993	
Sarah Veronica Leomy	Sierra Leone	Female	1993	
Tunku Tan Sri Mohamed Bin Tunku Besar Burhanuddin	Malaysia	Male	1995	
Botho Prinz zu Sayn-Wittgenstein-Hohenstein	Germany	Male	1995	
Esmildo Gutierrez Sanchez	Cuba	Male	1995	
Hugo Ernesto Merino Grijalva	Ecuador	Male	1995	
Hans Haug	Switzerland	Male	1995	
Jaqueline Briot	France	Female	1995	
Sheryl Thayer	New Zealand	Female	1997	
Ahmed Alsherif	Libya	Male	1997	
Aimé Amuli	Uganda	Male	1997	
Amin Booyi Andana	Uganda	Male	1997	
Bahozi Kabaka	DRC	Male	1997	
Bernard Umba Kanonge	DRC	Male	1997	
Cédric Martin	Switzerland	Male	1997	
Chin Chun	Cambodia	Male	1997	
Déogratias Kitungao Bisahi	DRC	Male	1997	
Dieudonné Budogo	DRC	Male	1997	
Djuma Sebasore	DRC	Male	1997	
Enzo Boletti	Italy	Male	1997	
Hans Elkerbrot	Netherlands	Male	1997	
Herculano Tchipindi	Angola	Male	1997	
Ilunfa Sebastien	DRC	Male	1997	
Juan Ruffino	Italy	Male	1997	
Luiji Apata	Uganda	Male	1997	
Mafuta Nzangamya	DRC	Female	1997	
Reto Neuenschwander	Switzerland	Male	1997	
Véronique Ahouanmenou	Benin	Female	1997	
Fernanda Calado	Spain	Female	1997	
Gunnhild Myklebust	Norway	Female	1997	
Ingebjorg Foss	Norway	Female	1997	
Nancy Malloy	Canada	Female	1997	
Ute Stuhrwoldt	Germany	Female	1999	
Guillermo Rueda Montaña	Colombia	Male	1999	
Hon Dr Byron Hove	Zimbabwe	Male	1999	
Donald Tansley	Canada	Male	1999	
Phlech Phiroun	Cambodia	Female	2001	Former President of the Cambodian Red Cross.
Roger Durand	Switzerland	Male	2001	Founder and president of the Henry Dunant Society and former Vice-president of the Geneva Red Cross.
Noreen Minogue	Australia	Female	2003	Former deputy Secretary General of the Australian Red Cross and promoter of International Humanitarian Law
André Durand	Switzerland	Male	2003	Former ICRC field delegate and author of a history of the ICRC and the Movement
Frits Kalshoven	Netherlands	Male	2003	Legal scholar and a specialist in International Humanitarian Law
Monique Basque	Ivory Coast	Female	2003	Former President of the Red Cross of Ivory Coast
Princess Christina	Sweden	Female	2005	Former President of the Swedish Red Cross and member of the Standing Commission of the Red Cross and Red Crescent
Mekonnen Muluneh	Ethiopia	Male	2005	Of the Ethiopian Red Cross Society
Jean Pictet	Switzerland	Male	2005	(posthumously). Main architect of the Geneva Conventions of 1949 and former Vice-President of the International Committee of the Red Cross (ICRC)
Bjorn Egge	Norway	Male	2005	Former President of the Norwegian Red Cross.
The Volunteers of the Indonesian Red Cross Society, the Sri Lanka Red Cross Society, the Indian Red Cross Society, and the Thai Red Cross Society	–	–	2005	The volunteers and staff of the Red Cross Societies of the four countries most severely affected by the devastating tsunami of 26 December 2004—India, Indonesia, Sri Lanka and Thailand
Josiane Gabel	France	Female	2007	Former French Red Cross delegate in Congo and in Chad and National First Aid Director of the Red Cross of Chad
James Joseph Carlton	Australia	Male	2007	Former secretary general of the Australian Red Cross and Australian Minister of Health from 1982 to 1983.
Alexander Dumba Ika	DRC	Male	2007	Former head of the Congolese Red Cross tracing service in Ituri and head of the ICRC delegation in Bunia.
Christoph Hensch	Switzerland	Male	2007	Former ICRC delegate and survivor of the attack on the Red Cross hospital in the Chechen town of Novye Atagi, in 1996.
Zoy Katevas Lazaratu de Sclabos	Chile	Female	2009	
Muctarr Amadu Sheriff Jalloh	Sierra Leone	Male	2009	
Cornelio Sommaruga	Switzerland	Male	2009	
Fouad Hamza	Syria	Male	2009	
Pär Stenback	Finland	Male	2009	
Datuk Datin Paduka Ruby Lee	Malaysia	Female	2009	Former Malaysian Red Crescent Society secretary-general.
Shimelis Adugna	Ethiopia	Male	2011	Former president of the Ethiopian Red Cross and former minister of labour and social affairs of Ethiopia.
Astrid Nøklebye Heiberg	Norway	Female	2011	Former president of the Norwegian Red Cross and former president of the International Federation of Red Cross and Red Crescent Societies.
Bosko Jakovljevic	Serbia	Male	2011	
Barges Hamoud Al-Barges	Kuwait	Male	2013	Founding member and former president of the Kuwait Red Crescent Society.
Alberto Cairo	Italy	Male	2013	A member of the Italian Red Cross, he has worked in Afghanistan continuously since 1990 (except for a short mission in Sarajevo in 1993), running a network of orthopedic centers since 1994.
Tom Buruku	Uganda	Male	2013	Former chairman of the Uganda Red Cross Society and a founding member of the New Partnership for African Red Cross and Red Crescent Societies (NEPARC).
Meneca de Mencía / Doña Meneca de Mencía	Honduras	Female	2013	Former president of the Honduran Red Cross and former chair of the Inter-American Regional Committee.
Manowara Sarkar	Bangladesh	Female	2015	
Ahmed Mohamed Hassan	Somalia	Male	2015	
Mamdouh Kamal Gabr	Egypt	Male	2015	
Stephen Davey	United Kingdom	Male	2015	
Michael Bothe	Germany	Male	2017	
Arthur Agany Poole	South Sudan	Male	2017	
Michael Meyer	United Kingdom	Male	2019	
Mario Villaroel Lander	Venezuela	Male	2019	
Manuela Cabero Morán	Spain	Female	2019	
