= 2006 floods =

2006 floods could refer to a number of flooding incidents in 2006:

- Mid-Atlantic United States flood of 2006
- 2006 European floods
- 2006-07 Southeast Asian floods
- 2006-2007 Malaysian floods
- 2006 North Korea flooding
- Southwest floods of 2006

See also

- Weather in 2006 for an overview
- List of notable floods
- Floods in the United States: 2001-present
