= Shimelis =

Shimelis is a given name. Notable people with the name include:

- Shimelis Abdisa, Ethiopian politician
- Shimelis Adugna, Ethiopian politician and diplomat
- Shimelis Bekele (born 1990), Ethiopian footballer
