= Tengku Muhammad Taufik =

Malaysian corporate figure

Yang Mulia Tan Sri Datuk Tengku Muhammad Taufik Tengku Kamadjaja Aziz PSM PGBK PJN
- تڠکو محمد توفيق تڠکو کاماجاي عزيز
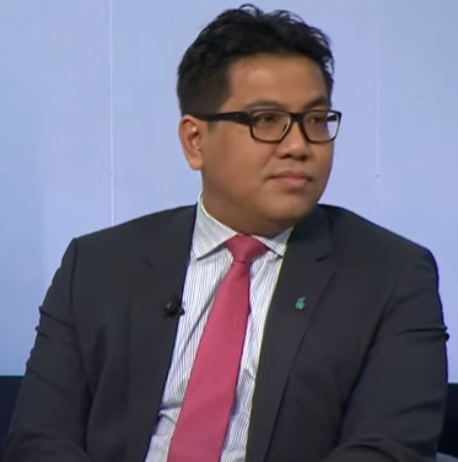
- Tengku Muhammad Taufik at World Economic Forum Davos 2022

President and Group Chief Executive Officer of Petronas
- Incumbent
- Assumed office 1 July 2020
- Preceded by: Wan Zulkiflee

Personal details
- Born: Tengku Muhammad Taufik bin Tengku Kamadjaja Aziz; 6 February 1974 (age 52) Malaysia
- Education: Strathclyde University (BA)

Tan Sri Datuk Tengku Muhammad Taufik bin Tengku Kamadjaja Aziz (Jawi: تڠکو محمد توفيق بن تڠکو کاماجاي عزيز; born 6 February 1974) is a Malaysian corporate figure who is the President and Group Chief Executive Officer (CEO) of Petronas.

== Honours ==
- Malaysia
  - Commander of the Order of Loyalty to the Crown of Malaysia (PSM) – Tan Sri (2023)
  - Commander of the Order of Meritorious Service (PJN) – Datuk (2021)
- Sarawak
  - Commander of the Order of the Star of Hornbill Sarawak (PGBK) – Datuk (2022)
