= NCBM =

NCBM may refer to:

- National Council for the Blind Malaysia, an organization based in Malaysia
- Naval Consolidated Brig, Miramar, a military prison in the United States
