= Malaysian Red Crescent Society =

Non-profit organization

Malaysian Red Crescent
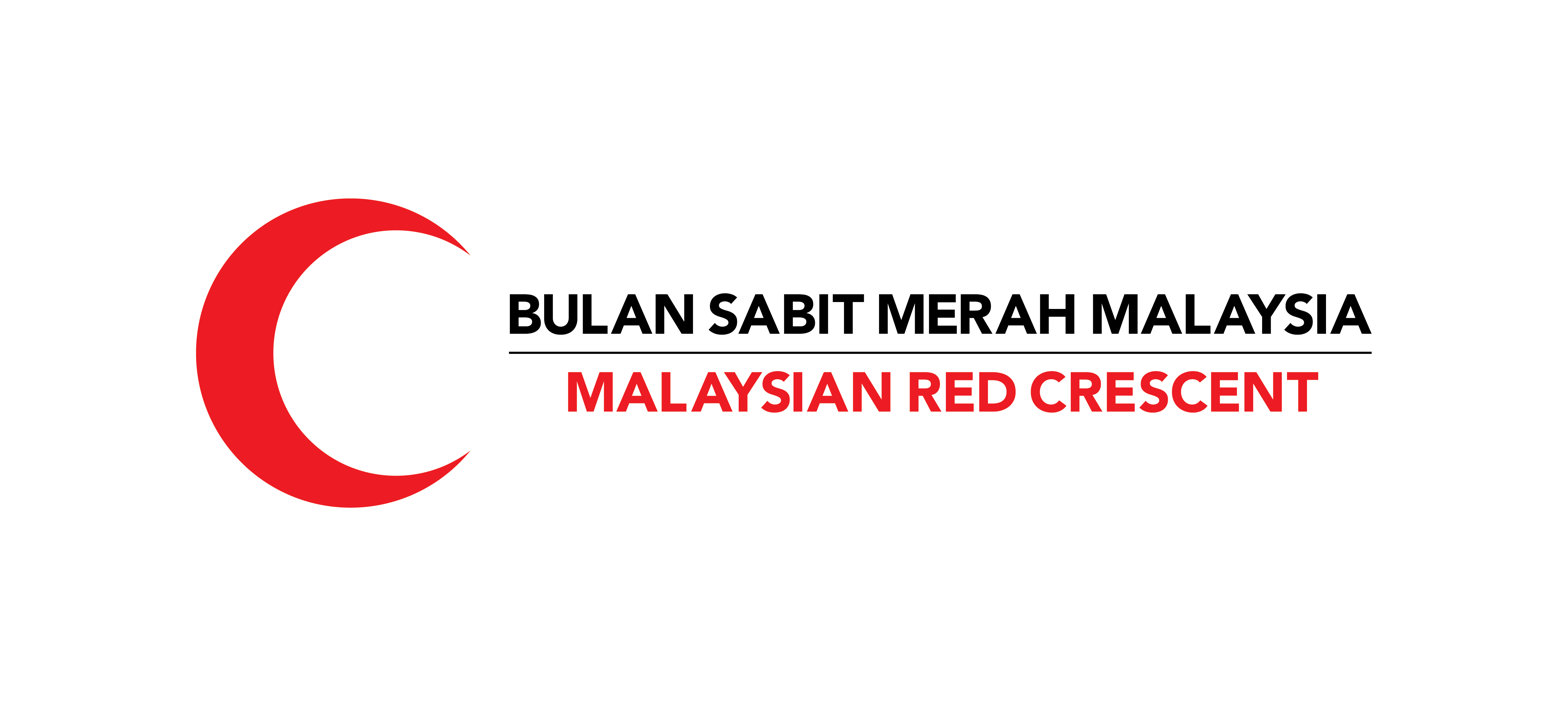

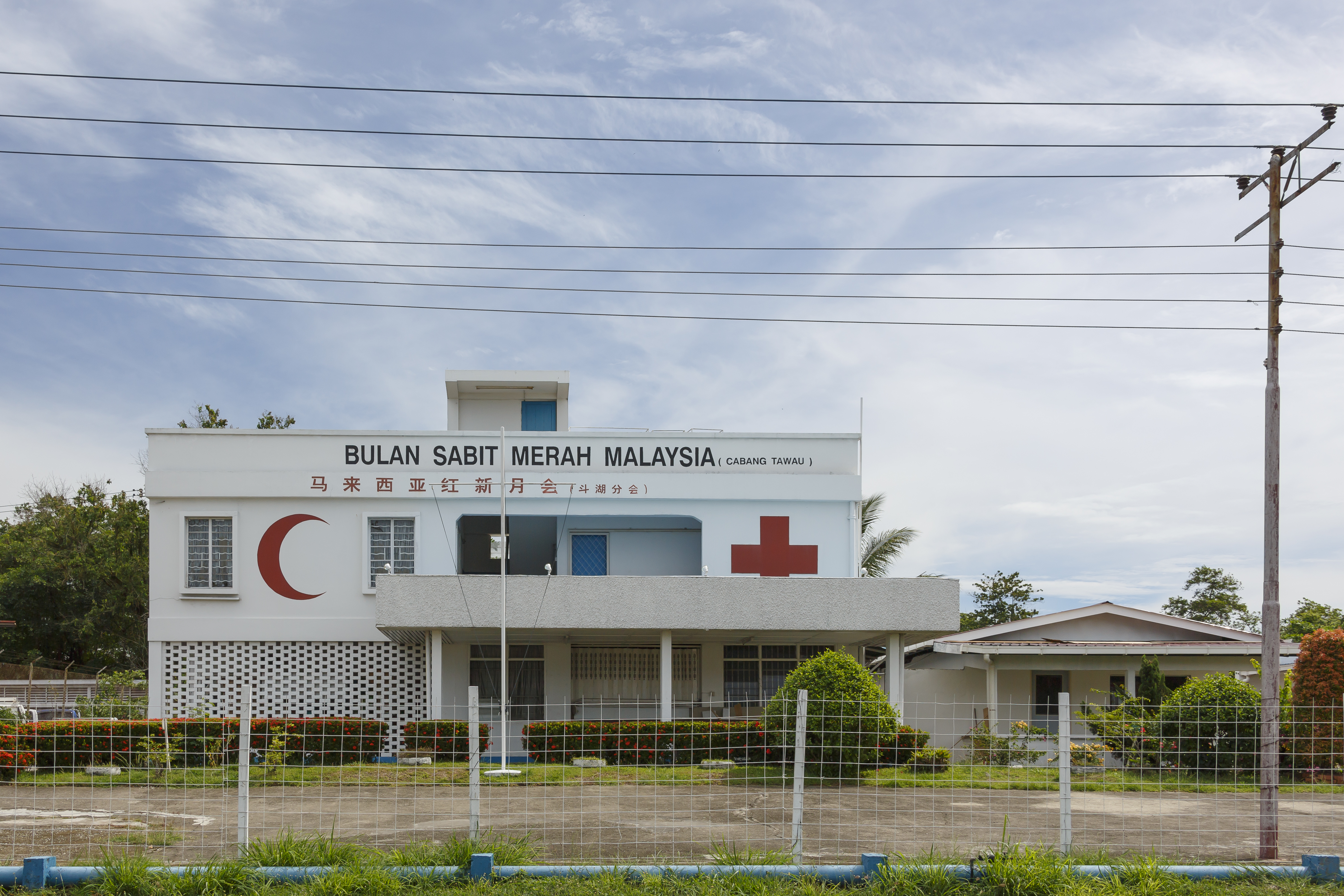
- Abbreviation: MRC (English); BSMM (Malay)
- Founded: 1948
- Type: Non-profit organisation
- Purpose: Humanitarian Aid
- Location: Malaysia
- Key people: Tunku Puteri Intan Safinaz, National Chairman
- Affiliations: International Committee of the Red Cross; International Federation of Red Cross and Red Crescent Societies
- Revenue: RM12,697,072 RM5,866,855 (2020,2019)
- Website: www.redcrescent.org.my mrcscommunity.org.my

The Malaysian Red Crescent (MRC; Malay: Bulan Sabit Merah Malaysia, BSMM) is a voluntary humanitarian organization that seeks to promote humanitarian values, as well as provide service and public education in disaster management, as well as healthcare in the community. It is part of the International Red Cross and Red Crescent Movement.

Organised in 16 chapters and more than 150 branches nationwide, MRC is headquartered in Kuala Lumpur. MRC also has a presence among youths and young adults through a network of youth and adult volunteer units in schools and institutions of higher learning.

== Status ==
MRC is a legally established organization under various Acts of Parliament, including the Federation of Malaya (Incorporation) Act 1962, the Malaysian Red Cross Society (Incorporation) Act 1965, the Change of Name Act 1975, and revised Act 540 in 1995. Its structure is based on the 1949 Geneva Conventions, to which Malaysia is committed.

MRC is recognized by the Malaysian government as a volunteer aid organization. It supports public authorities in humanitarian efforts and assists the medical services of the armed forces, following the Fundamental Principles of the Movement and the 1949 Geneva Conventions.

MRC follows the Fundamental Principles of the Movement declared at the 20th International Conference of the Red Cross in Vienna, 1965, and upholds the mottos "Inter arma caritas" (in war, charity) and "Per humanitatem ad pacem" (through humanity to peace), reflecting the Movement's ideals.

== History ==
=== Formation of society ===
MRC has its beginnings in 1948 as branches of the British Red Cross Society in the former British North Borneo (now the Malaysian state of Sabah) and Sarawak. In 1950, the British Red Cross Society established the first branch in Penang in the Federation of Malaya from which it rapidly expanded its presence in the other states.

Upon the independence of the Federation of Malaya on 31 August 1957, the branches in Malaya were reorganised as the Federation of Malaya Red Cross Society and the society was officially incorporated by statute with the passing of the Federation of Malaya Red Cross Society (Incorporation) Act 1962 by Parliament. On 4 July 1963, the Federation of Malaya Red Cross Society received official recognition as an independent national society by the International Committee of the Red Cross and subsequently admitted as a member of the League of Red Cross Societies on 24 August 1963.

With the formation of the larger federation of Malaysia on 16 September 1963, the Malaysian Red Cross Society (Incorporation) Act 1965 to incorporate the Federation of Malaya Red Cross Society and the branches of the Red Cross Society in Sabah and Sarawak under the name of the Malaysian Red Cross Society was passed by Parliament and gazetted on 1 July 1965. On 5 September 1975, the Malaysian Red Cross Society was renamed the Malaysian Red Crescent Society by the passing of the Malaysian Red Cross Society (Change of Name) Act 1975 by Parliament.

=== Leadership ===
Datuk Ruby Lee was the first secretary general for the MRC, serving the post for 32 years from 1965 to 1996. The current secretary general is Dato' Danial Iskandar Bin Abdul Rahman, replacing Mr. Hakim Hamzah who served the post from May 2021 to December 2024.

=== Vietnamese Boat People ===
MRC was awarded the Nansen Medal by the UNHCR on 10 October 1977 for its role in "aiding thousands of refugees who arrived in their country in recent years as a result of the conflict in Indo-China".

MRC was in charge of providing all facilities for the care and maintenance of Vietnamese Boat People (VBP) since the first landing on 4 May 1975 of 47 VBP on Pulau Bidong, a small island off the northeast coast of the Malay Peninsula. Since then, over a continuous period of 19 years more than 250,000 VBP have landed in Malaysia. In 1994, there were 6,500 refugees housed in two camps, located at Sungai Besi and Cheras, each a few kilometres outside the city of Kuala Lumpur. In June 2001, the UNHCR and MRC closed the last refugee camp in Kuala Lumpur, ending 21 years of cooperation in which more than a quarter-million people transited the country. In August 2005, 43-year-old Doan Van Viet became the last refugee to exit the country to return to Viet Nam.

== Mandate ==
In terms of Malaysian legislation, the mandate of MRC is outlined in an Act of Parliament, in Directives of the National Security Council, an Act of the Ministry of Health, and a Police Directive on crisis and violence management.

More precisely, as defined in the MRC Constitution, it shall be the duty of the Society to perform the following:

1. Maintain a permanent and active uniform organisation to save lives, reduce suffering, damage and losses and; to protect, comfort and support affected people, especially casualties of armed conflicts, disasters or other emergencies irrespective of nationality, race, class, gender, creed, language, age, disability, ethnicity, social background, political considerations and any other similar grounds;
2. Promote knowledge of international humanitarian law and the Fundamental Principles of the Movement, strategies and policies of the Federation and the Movement, social inclusion and a culture of non-violence and peace in order to develop humanitarian ideals among the population and in particular among children and youth;
3. Contribute to the improvement of health, the prevention of disease and the mitigation of suffering to enable healthy and safe living;
4. Promote the participation of children and young people in the work of the Society and to strengthen the international friendship amongst Red Cross and Red Crescent Youth all over the world;
5. Cooperate with the Government and local authorities and other voluntary organisations engaged in work similar to that of the Society provided that the Society retains administrative control over its own funds, personnel and material and to take all necessary steps to prevent the illegal use or abuse of the Red Cross / Red Crescent name and emblem;
6. Promote and maintain public interest in the activities of the Society and to rely for the running of its administration on voluntary contributions, donations and approved income generating activities and as much as possible to give free services provided that the Society may receive income derived from the Society's property (movable or immovable) or investments provided also that grants in aid may be accepted from the Government, local authorities and private organisations for meeting the expenses of any specified service undertaken by the Society;
7. Promote the formation of Chapters, Branches and Units and exercise control over their activities;
8. Consider and approve in appropriate cases recommendations for the bestowal of distinctions, medals and badges of the Society, the Movement, Federal and State awards and to take all the necessary steps to prevent the unauthorised use of the Society's name, uniform, medals and badges.

== Programs and activities ==
=== Health ===
==== Blood donation ====
Through the Community Health Service programme, MRC has carried out blood donation activities through awareness campaigns and blood donation programmes conducted in public places. The MRC Miri District became the first branch in the country to gain UN recognition for Voluntary Non-Remunerated Blood Donation (VNRBD) over 30 years ago.

==== Ambulance service ====
The Malaysian Red Crescent runs a 24-hour ambulance service throughout the nation which consists of over 50 ambulance units in 16 branches. In 2016, MRC and St John's Ambulance participated in a nationwide pilot project to ensure that ambulances can reach a patient in need of emergency services within 15 minutes. In March 2022, an MoU was signed to cement the cooperation between the two organisations and MOH, which would cover Hotspots 999 Ambulance Services (Perkhidmatan Ambulans Hotspots 999) and AED Komuniti Malaysia programmes in providing emergency and disaster aid to victims, as well as training programmes. In February 2023, the Health Minister said in a parliamentary reply that between 28% and 42% of MOH ambulances achieved the 15-min KPI arrival for critical emergency cases from 2016 to 2022.

==== First aid training ====
The MRC initiated a programme called "A First Aider in Every Home". The objective of the programme is to have at least 1 person trained in first aid in every Malaysian family.

MRC jointly organized a first aid course for the visually impaired with the Saudi Red Crescent and the Malaysian Association for the Blind.

==== Medical care ====
From February 2023, MRC and Maaedicare Charitable Foundation have teamed up to deliver free, affordable healthcare in Malaysia via Klinik Amal Percuma. The clinic will provide free medical services such as primary care, chronic disease management, health education and counselling to underserved folk, and 16 free clinics will be set up in various states.

=== Disaster response ===
==== Flood ====
MRC responded to the 2007 Johor floods. The U.S. Agency for International Development (USAID) provided $50,000 to the Malaysian Red Crescent to support emergency relief efforts, and the IFRC allocated CHF 50,000 (US$41,425) from the Disaster Relief Emergency Fund (DREF).

==== Typhoon ====
On 25 December 1996, the Malaysian state of Sabah in Borneo was hit by Tropical Storm Greg. In response, the MRC staffed 3 relief centres for the victims and distributed food to those affected.

==== Tsunami ====
After the 2004 Indian Ocean Tsunami caused damage to the coastal areas of Perlis, Penang and Kedah, the MRC appealed for donations and volunteers responded to the disaster. Temporary shelters were set up for the victims who lost their homes. Food and water was also distributed among the victims.

==== Earthquake ====
In 2015, the state of Sabah was hit by earthquake, where the MRC mobilised relief efforts to the disaster.

==== Landslide ====
After the 2022 Batang Kali landslide, MRC responded by supporting with the search and rescue, and supplying medical aid and psychosocial support to the survivors at the site.

=== Overseas response and fundraising ===
In response to the 2011 Japan earthquake and tsunami, the Malaysian Red Crescent collected donations amounting to over RM3 million and sent to the Japanese Red Cross Society.

The Malaysian Red Crescent Society appealed for donations and launched a relief effort in response to the 2015 Nepal Earthquake. Six volunteers also joined the Special Malaysian Disaster Assistance and Rescue Team (SMART) that responded to the disaster.

They also launched a relief effort in 2018 to help the victims of the earthquake and tsunami that struck Sulawesi, Indonesia. MRC deployed a total of four personnel to Palu to support the emergency response carried out with Indonesian Red Cross. The team collected data and helped out with basic relief operations, such as distributing food and other items. The team also supported PMI with the construction of water, sanitation and hygiene facilities to serve the displaced population.

=== International humanitarian law (IHL) ===
On 19 May 2022, MRC launched a handbook that was jointly developed with the ICRC to promote IHL among members of the parliament. Titled "Promoting Respect for International Humanitarian Law: A Handbook for Malaysian Parliamentarians", the book aims to serve as a reference for Malaysian parliamentarians in carrying out relevant roles, as well as a general introduction to IHL and the ICRC, the MRC and the International Red Cross and Red Crescent Movement particularly in Malaysia. The publication was also supported by the Ministry of Foreign Affairs, the Malaysian parliament and the Institute for Political Reform and Democracy (REFORM Malaysia), and the launch followed by a round-table discussion themed around the 60th anniversary of Malaysia's accession to the Geneva Conventions in 2022.

=== Restoring Family Links ===
MRC supported ICRC in providing Restoring Family Links service in five immigration detention depots, i.e. Bukit Jalil, Semenyih, Lenggeng, Langkap and Belantek. The purpose of this service is to assist detainees to reconnect with their families to notify of their conditions and to get assistance such as documentation or flight ticket. Services provided are Red Cross Message, telephone, notifications to either or both their Embassies and UNHCR. The service is normally carried out between 3–5 days with the assistance of volunteers and staff of MRC.

== COVID-19 pandemic response ==
During the 2020 COVID-19 pandemic, the MRC launched the #responsMALAYSIA (Malaysia's response) programme. The programme aims to provide a platform for individuals and corporate entities to contribute towards the procurement of essential items required by frontliners, as well as drive MRC's community engagement efforts.

=== COVID-19 Perception Survey ===
MRC implemented three rounds of perception survey funded by the World Health Organization (WHO) and supported by the International Federation of Red Cross/Red Crescent Societies (IFRC) to gather the attitude, concerns, and information needs of the people about the COVID-19 pandemic. Some of the survey findings are:

1. Perceived Danger and Health Care Access - According to the survey, 94% of respondents consider COVID-19 to be very dangerous. However, 43% of people reported not seeking essential health care services during the pandemic, with 20% of these individuals expressing fear of being infected by COVID-19 at health facilities.
2. Protective Measures and Information Sources - The vast majority of respondents adhere to the Ministry of Health's recommended protective measures: 92% practice hand washing, 82% use hand sanitizer, 82% wear masks, and 77% cover their mouths when coughing or sneezing. For information, 79% of respondents frequently use social media, 68% watch television, and 57% rely on websites or online news sources.
3. Misconceptions and Vaccine Hesitancy - Concerningly, almost half of the participants (47%) believe that specific groups of people are responsible for spreading COVID-19 in their community. Additionally, 44% of respondents are uncertain about receiving the vaccine due to concerns about potential side effects, overall safety, effectiveness, cost, and religious appropriateness.
4. Mental Wellbeing - The survey also highlighted mental wellbeing issues, revealing that a slightly higher percentage of female respondents (40%) reported feeling sad, anxious, or worried compared to male respondents (35%).

=== Mid-Term review of the COVID19 response ===
MRC underwent a mid-term review from 3 March to 8 April 2021 to evaluate the progress and outcomes of its overall COVID-19 response from January 2020 to January 2021. The review focused on the relevance and appropriateness, effectiveness and efficiency, and the connectedness and sustainability of the assistance provided. The review findings are summarised below:

- Relevance and Appropriateness of Assistance

The MRC effectively complemented the government's efforts, reaching target populations such as B40 households, undocumented migrants, foreign workers, and homeless individuals. Aid recipients benefited from food packages, hygiene kits, and cash and voucher assistance. Notably, MRC volunteers were well-protected against COVID-19, with no reported infections among volunteers on duty. Additionally, the MRC was entrusted by the government to coordinate volunteers for the National COVID-19 Immunisation Programme rollout.

However, the review identified some shortcomings. Despite recognition by the Malaysian government of MRC's auxiliary role, there was a lack of understanding among some government agencies, partners, and the public about MRC's roles and mandate. Although material assistance was comprehensive, the MRC was less involved in addressing the psychosocial needs of the population, despite the evident necessity. The MRC was also advised to improve its needs assessment and community engagement practices, including establishing beneficiary feedback mechanisms.

- Effectiveness and Efficiency

The review found that the MRC was considered a trustworthy and responsible humanitarian organization by stakeholders, including government agencies, collaborating partners, donors, and the general public. MRC volunteers were viewed as a dedicated and altruistic team committed to community service. While the MRC continuously improved its operations in response to COVID-19, many of its standard operating procedures (SOPs) required updates, including those related to disaster management and financial and administrative policies.

The review also highlighted that the MRC lacked the capacity to plan and implement integrated and multisectoral programs effectively due to a culture of working in silos. There were varying understandings and expectations regarding operational transparency and accountability, with no formal communication mechanism to ensure timely feedback and information sharing involving donors and government entities. Additionally, the MRC faced challenges in recruiting and retaining both staff and volunteers, necessitating a more innovative, long-term, and integrated volunteer development program to address emerging emergencies like the global pandemic.

- Connectedness and Sustainability

MRC's leadership and participation in the Malaysian Coordination and Action Hub (MATCH) demonstrated its commitment to delivering coordinated and sustainable humanitarian services in partnership with other organizations. However, not all MRC members fully understood its role within MATCH, and some MATCH members were unclear about its objectives, structure, and communication mechanisms.

It was also noted that MRC lacked a long-term strategy for resource mobilization. Partnerships with other organizations and government agencies were often ad-hoc and not part of a longer-term collaboration. Internal communication within the MRC also needed improvement, as uncoordinated communication between MRC headquarters and external partners, as well as between headquarters and state branches, led to unclear expectations and misunderstandings regarding fund allocation and project management.

=== COVID-19 Photo Exhibition ===
MRC held a photo exhibition at Rumah Tangsi in Kuala Lumpur in March 2022 to showcase its vaccination initiatives for the underserved community during the pandemic. Over a period of eight months, MRC administered over 50,000 vaccinations across 15 states, often having to trek off-road to serve remote communities. These mobile vaccinations outside the main vaccination centres (PPVs) started with the bedridden and OKU community, before expanding to the Orang Asli communities, migrants, asylum seekers, the homeless, and adolescents.

=== Additional funding from Australia for COVID-19 ===
In August 2022, MRC received a RM5mil grant-in-aid for vaccine and booster doses from the Australian Government through the Australian Red Cross. MRC Negeri Sembilan chapter organised a Long Covid Awareness Day together with a blood and organ donation drive at Mydin Mall in Seremban 2. During screenings for long Covid at the event, 38.5% of respondents reported that they still felt unwell despite more than three months since their last COVID-19 infection. The majority said they experienced fatigue (23.1%), persistent cough (19.2%) and memory problems (17.3%).

== Membership ==
Membership of MRC is open to all individuals without any discrimination based on nationality, race, class, gender, creed, language, age, disability, ethnicity, social background, political considerations or any other similar grounds. There are three different roles that needs to be distinguished as some can overlap, while others cannot be taken up concurrently.

=== Members ===
A Member who is of thirty years of age or below will be categorised as a Youth Member and may participate in the Youth activities of the Society and the Federation. People can join as life members or to renew their membership on an annual basis.

MRC members are expected to affirm and abide by the Constitution of the Society, as well as adhere to and disseminate the Fundamental Principles of the Movement. Members are expected to promote the work of the Society. Members are able to vote as well as being eligible to stand for election to take up the position of an elected office. Members can present proposals and raise issues in accordance with the Regulations of the Society.

=== Volunteers ===
MRCS volunteers are people who provide direct services to the community, aiming to prevent and reduce vulnerability and exclusion. They may also take on leadership roles and support the Society's services. Volunteers choose to help out of their own free will, not for money or due to any outside social, economic, or political pressures. Volunteers should be organized in their activities and always follow the Fundamental Principles and the Society's Constitution. Anyone can become a volunteer, regardless of nationality, race, class, gender, religion, language, age, disability, ethnicity, social background, or political beliefs. Volunteers do not need to be official Members of the Society.

=== Staff ===
Staff of MRC are those who sign a contract of employment with or who are appointed as permanent employees of the Society. They may also become Members, however, as long as they are staff they are not eligible to stand for or to be elected to any office or position within MRC, and do not have voting rights in such elections.

Historically, before World War I, some wealthy individuals could volunteer their time without pay or reimbursement, but by 1950, economic conditions had changed, making it difficult for people to volunteer without earning a living. Additionally, the work of National Societies had expanded, and hiring qualified, professional staff had become necessary. In 1950, the ICRC and IFRC examined whether paying the staff of national societies conflicted with the movement's fundamental principles. The study concluded that the hiring of staff is not a violation, and determined that each National Society should decide how to recruit its staff, and its remuneration depends on the economic and social conditions of each country.

== Organisational structure ==
The organisational structure of the Society consists of the following; the National Council, the Governing Board, Chapters, Branches, and Units.

=== MRCS National Council ===
The National Council is the supreme deliberative body with power to regulate and control all affairs MRC in accordance with relevant Acts.

The National Council is composed of the following; the Elected members of the Governing Board, the Chairperson of the National Youth Council, up to five other members of the Governing Board appointed by the National Chairperson, and two representatives of each Chapter. There is also ex-officio, non-voting members, namely the Head of the Medical Services of the Malaysian Armed Forces, the Head of the Malaysian Medical Association, one representative each from the Ministries responsible for matters connected with MRC (as determined by the Governing Board) and the Secretary General of the Society.

=== MRCS Governing Board ===
The Governing Board is the main decision-making body of the Society between National Council meetings and follows the Council's directions and decisions. The National Chairperson can invite others to attend specific Governing Board meetings for particular purposes.

The Governing Board includes:

- The National Chairperson
- The National Deputy Chairperson
- Four National Vice Chairpersons
- The National Treasurer
- Up to eight elected members
- The Chairperson of the National Youth Council (ex officio)
- Up to five individuals appointed by the National Chairperson
- The Secretary General (ex officio, non-voting)

== See also ==
- List of Red Cross and Red Crescent Societies
- International Federation of Red Cross and Red Crescent Societies
