= Mohd Nardin Awang =

Malaysian politician

Yang Berbahagia Datuk Seri Mohd Nardin Awang SMW DPMP PJN JMN

Senior Political Secretary to the Prime Minister
- In office 24 April 2020 – 16 August 2021 Serving with Saiful Adli Mohd Arshad & Azlinda Abdul Latif (Political Secretary)
- Prime Minister: Muhyiddin Yassin

Special Officer to the Minister of Home Affairs
- In office 2018–2020
- Minister: Muhyiddin Yassin

Political Secretary to the Deputy Prime Minister
- In office 2013–2015
- Deputy Prime Minister: Muhyiddin Yassin

Special Officer to the Deputy Prime Minister
- In office 2009–2013
- Deputy Prime Minister: Muhyiddin Yassin

Political Secretary to the Minister of Education
- In office 2009–2011
- Minister: Muhyiddin Yassin

Personal details
- Born: Mohd Nardin bin Awang
- Party: United Malays National Organisation (UMNO); Malaysian United Indigenous Party (BERSATU)
- Other political affiliations: Barisan Nasional (BN); Pakatan Harapan (PH) (–2020); Perikatan Nasional (PN) (2020–)
- Occupation: Politician

Datuk Seri Mohd Nardin bin Awang is the former Senior Political Secretary to the 8th Prime Minister of Malaysia, Tan Sri Muhyiddin Yassin. He has been serving Tan Sri Muhyiddin Yassin for a long time until he served in the Prime Minister's Office in 2020 as Senior Political Secretary and was assisted by Saiful Adli Mohd Arshad and Azlinda Abdul Latif as Political Secretary. He took the oath of office together with 25 Political Secretaries for Muhyiddin Yassin's Cabinet.

== Career ==
After completing his studies in accounting at MARA Institute of Technology, he joined Nadi Holdings as an Administrative Executive, then continued his service at Sky Courier International and Pro-Active Solutions Sdn Bhd as Commercial and Operations Manager.

Nardin then joined the public service as a facilitator and trainer at the Bureau of National Planning, Prime Minister's Department in 1999.

Nardin's career started to rise after starting service with Muhyiddin Yassin. Starting as Political Secretary to the Minister of Education, Deputy Prime Minister to Senior Political Secretary.

== Politics ==
Nardin has made a courtesy visit with the Minister of Home Affairs, Hamzah Zainudin to the Yang di-Pertua Negeri of Sabah, Tun Juhar Mahiruddin after the former Chief Minister of Sabah, Musa Aman claims to have the majority to form a new government that supports the Perikatan Nasional Government.

== Honours ==
- Malaysia
  - Companion of the Order of the Defender of the Realm (JMN) (2011)
  - Commander of the Order of Meritorious Service (PJN) – Datuk (2014)
- Perak
  - Knight Commander of the Order of the Perak State Crown (DPMP) – Dato' (2012)
- Federal Territory (Malaysia)
  - Grand Commander of the Order of the Territorial Crown (SMW) – Datuk Seri (2021)
