= Shimelis Adugna =

Ethiopian diplomat and official (1935–2024)

- ሽመለስ አዱኛ
- Born: 13 October 1935; Hararghe, Italian Ethiopia
- Died: 25 December 2024 (aged 89)
- Education: General Wingate Secondary School, Addis Ababa; University College of Addis Ababa (BA in Education); Tata Institute of Social Sciences (MA in Social Service Administration, 1961)
- Occupations: Diplomat, government official
- Known for: President of the Ethiopian Red Cross Society; Vice President of the International Federation of Red Cross and Red Crescent Societies for Africa; Founding President of the Family Guidance Association of Ethiopia (1965–1983)
- Office: Minister of Labor and Social Affairs; Ambassador to the Republic of India; Vice Minister of the Interior (correctional institutions)
- Awards: Henry Dunant Medal (International Red Cross Red Crescent Movement)

Shimelis Adugna (Amharic: ሽመልስ አዱኛ, 13 October 1935 – 25 December 2024) was an Ethiopian diplomat and official who was the former president of the Ethiopian Red Cross Society. He joined primary school in Hararge and attended high school at General Wingate secondary school in Addis Ababa. Eventually, he joined the then University College of Addis Ababa for BA in Education. From 1959-1961, he pursued graduate studies and received an MA in Social Service Administration from the Tata Institute of Social Sciences. He served as the Vice President of the International Federation of Red Cross and Red Crescent Societies for Africa and as national coordinator for Jobs for Africa, an employment generation and poverty reduction program of the International Labour Organization and the United Nations Development Program. He was also the Founding President of the Family Guidance Association of Ethiopia (FGAE) for 18 years, from 1965 to 1983.

Shimelis also served as Minister of Labor and Social Affairs, ambassador to the Republic of India, Vice Minister of the Interior in charge of correctional institutions, and as an independent consultant and government advisor on issues of famine, demobilized soldiers, and orphans.

== Awards ==
Shimelis Adugna was awarded the Henry Dunant Medal for outstanding humanitarian service, the highest award given by the International Red Cross Red Crescent Movement. He received the medal for "his personal commitment, his important contribution to the development of humanitarian activities and his work in promoting the Movement’s Fundamental Principles and ideals." Jimma University also awarded Honorary Doctorate to Shimelis Adugna on the 4th of January 2022 in recognition of outstanding selfless leadership qualities.
