= Ruby Lee (Malaysian) =

Datuk Ruby Lee was the former secretary general for the Malaysian Red Crescent Society, serving the post for 32 years from 1965 to 1996.

She joined the Red Cross and Red Crescent Movement in 1953, and she was one of the longest-serving secretaries general for a humanitarian organisation in the world.

== Work ==
Ruby Lee helmed the national society through some of the country's most critical situations, including the 13 May riots and collapse of the Highland Towers. Through her leadership, she also helped provide shelter, relief and repatriation for over 20 years to 200,000 Vietnamese boat people, who later found new homes and started new lives in other countries.

In 2001, Ruby Lee was part of the humanitarian fact-finding mission to Baghdad led by Tun Dr Siti Hasmah, to witness the extent of the catastrophe which had affected Iraq as a result of the economic sanctions imposed on the country by the United Nations (UN) in 1990.

Lee was known as a staunch supporter of programs for women, youths and the disabled. She believed in empowering more female leaders to strengthen the operational response of national societies as well as recruiting the youth who aspire to serve with humanitarian values, and said, "If men cannot persuade governments to talk about the Geneva protocols, maybe the women can! Perhaps women could bring fresh ideas to a refugee problem or to a conflict situation."

== Family ==
On 4 July 1947, Ruby Lee married Datuk Douglas K.K. Lee, the eldest son of Malaysia's former Finance and Transport Minister Tun H.S. Lee. She has two sons and a daughter (Michael, Kenny dan Janet), two daughters-in-law (Phyllis Chan and Noor Salasawati), a son-in-law (Sonny Lim) and four grandchildren.

== Death ==
Datuk Ruby Lee died on 14 June 2009 at home in Seksyen 5, Petaling Jaya, Selangor. She was 82 years old. The funeral was held at the St. Mary's Anglican Church, Jalan Raja next to Dataran Merdeka, Kuala Lumpur. In her final years, Lee used a wheelchair after a stroke and a prolonged battle with cancer.

== Awards and recognitions ==
In March 2009, Lee was awarded the Henry Dunant Medal for her dedication and sacrifice in the service of the Malaysian Red Crescent Society. The medal is considered to be the highest level of distinction from the International Red Cross and Red Crescent Movement.

=== Honours of Malaysia ===
- Malaysia
  - Officer of the Order of the Defender of the Realm (KMN) (1981)
  - Companion of the Order of Loyalty to the Crown of Malaysia (JSM) (1992)
  - Commander of the Order of Meritorious Service (PJN) – Datuk (1998)
- Selangor
  - Knight Companion of the Order of Sultan Salahuddin Abdul Aziz Shah (DSSA) – Datin Paduka (1985)
