= Alberto Cairo (physiotherapist) =

Italian physiotherapist and humanitarian

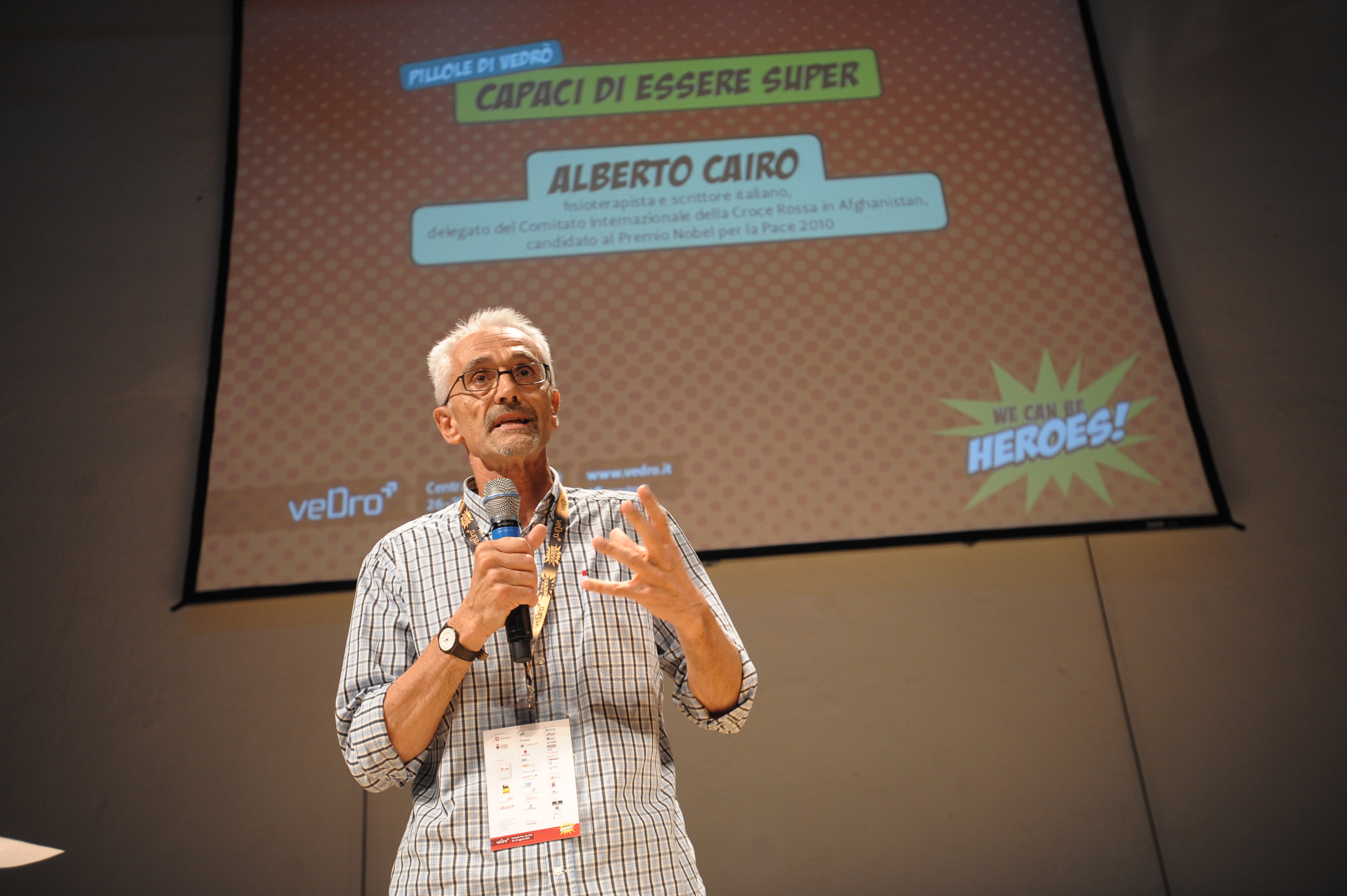
- Alberto Cairo in 2012
- Born: May 17, 1952 (age 74); Ceva, Italy
- Occupation: Physiotherapist
- Employer: ICRC
- Awards: Henry Dunant Medal; Nansen Refugee Award

Alberto Cairo (born May 17, 1952, in Ceva, Italy) is an Italian physiotherapist and humanitarian known for his work treating Afghan amputees. He directs the seven centres for orthopedics run by the International Committee of the Red Cross in Afghanistan.

== Early life and education ==
Alberto Cairo was born in Ceva, Italy on May 17 1952. He grew up in Turin, Italy. Cairo first worked as a lawyer in Italy.

== Career ==
From 1987 to 1990, Cairo worked for an Italian NGO in Sudan.

In 1990, Cairo joined the International Committee of the Red Cross and was assigned to Kabul, Afghanistan to develop their programs in physical rehabilitation. Since then, Cairo has worked continuously for the Red Cross, and is now the director of its seven Afghan orthopedic centres. As of 2017 he is credited with helping over 100,000 Afghan victims of landmines and accidents to walk again through the use of prosthetics.

== Awards ==
In 2010, Cairo was nominated for a Nobel Peace Prize. In 2013, he received the Henry Dunant Medal, the highest award of the Red Cross Movement. He was awarded Honorary citizenship of Afghanistan on July 21 2019.

He won the Nansen Refugee Award in 2019.
