= Wan Zulkiflee =

Malaysian businessman

Yang Berbahagia Tan Sri Wan Zulkiflee PSM PJN DGPN

Chairman of Nestle (Malaysia) Berhad; Chairman of Gas Malaysia; Former Chairman of Malaysia Aviation Group Berhad and Malaysia Airlines; Former president & CEO of Petronas; Former Director of ExxonMobil
- Preceded by: Shamsul Azhar Abbas

Personal details
- Born: Wan Zulkiflee bin Wan Ariffin; 19 August 1960 (age 65) Penang, Federation of Malaya
- Education: University of Adelaide
- Occupation: Businessman

Wan Zulkiflee bin Wan Ariffin (born 19 August 1960) is a Malaysian businessman; the chairman of Nestle (Malaysia) Berhad, former chairman of Malaysia Aviation Group Berhad and Malaysia Airlines, and former president and CEO of Petronas. In 2021, he was appointed a member of the ExxonMobil board of directors, becoming the first non-American appointed to the board. He was ousted four months later during shareholder votes.

== Early life ==
Wan Zulkiflee attended the Malay College Kuala Kangsar and graduated in 1977. He later earned a bachelor's degree in chemical engineering from the University of Adelaide, South Australia, and attended the six-week Advanced Management Program at Harvard Business School in 2004.

== Career ==
He was appointed Pro Chancellor of Universiti Teknologi Petronas (UTP) in 2012.

He was the president and CEO of Petronas from April 2015 until 30 June 2020, taking over from Tan Sri Shamsul Azhar Abbas. In June 2018, Attorney General of Sarawak requested that Petronas be relieved of its authority role in the oil and gas market in the Sarawak region. Zulkiflee has stated that oil and gas royalties and regulatory rights in the region were always under the authority of the Malaysian government, but consented to work toward a mutually acceptable working agreement nonetheless.

In August 2018, Ahmad Nizam was appointed chairman of Petronas, however Zulkiflee maintained his position as CEO and president.

In February 2021, ExxonMobil announced the appointment of Tan Sri Wan Zulkiflee as their first non-American director, making him the 11th director on board. During 2021 Annual Meeting of Shareholders, Wan Zulkiflee was amongst three directors who will be departing the board.

In July 2021, Wan Zulkiflee was appointed chairman of Gas Malaysia.

In May 2024, Wan Zulkiflee was appointed chairman of Nestle (Malaysia) Berhad.

== Honours ==
- Malaysia
  - Commander of the Order of Loyalty to the Crown of Malaysia (PSM) – Tan Sri (2017)
  - Commander of the Order of Meritorious Service (PJN) – Datuk (2009)
- Penang
  - Commander of the Order of the Defender of State (DGPN) – Dato' Seri (2016)
