= Michael Bothe =

German legal scholar

Michael Bothe (born 11 June 1938) is a German legal scholar. The focus of his work is international law, in particular peacekeeping law, arms control, humanitarian law, international environmental law and comparative constitutional law.

== Life and work ==
Bothe was born in Berlin in 1938 and studied law and international relations at the universities of Heidelberg, Hamburg and Geneva. In 1961 he passed the first state examination in Heidelberg and the second state examination five years later in Stuttgart. In 1966, he obtained a diploma from the Graduate Institute of International Studies in Geneva. The following year, he received his doctorate in law from the University of Heidelberg with a thesis on the armed forces of international organizations.

From 1964 to 1979, he was a research assistant at the Max Planck Institute for Comparative Public Law and International Law in Heidelberg. In 1974, he obtained his habilitation at the University of Heidelberg. From 1974 to 1977 during the international diplomatic conference in Geneva on the first two additional protocols to the Geneva Conventions, he was a member of the delegation of the German Red Cross. From 1977 to 1979, he was an adjunct professor at the University of Heidelberg, then until 1983 a full professor at the University of Hanover. In 1983, he became the chair for public, international and European law at the Johann Wolfgang Goethe University in Frankfurt, where he also served as dean of the law department from 1993 to 1994 and where he worked until his retirement in 2003. He was also visiting professor at various foreign universities and in 1994 head of the research center of the Hague Academy of International Law.

Bothe headed the Expert Committee on Humanitarian International Law of the German Red Cross starting in 1995 and was chairman of the German Society for International Law from 2001 to 2005. He was also a member of the International Humanitarian Fact-Finding Commission from 2001 to 2011 and was its president starting in 2007. From 2002 to 2006, he was a research group leader at the Hessian Foundation for Peace and Conflict Research.

== Awards ==
- 1974 – Giuseppe Ciardi Prize (in the field of military law and international humanitarian law)
- 1987 – Elizabeth Haub Prize (in the field of environmental law)
- 2017 – Henry Dunant Medal

== Works (selected) ==
- Michael Bothe, Kay Hailbronner, Eckart Klein, Wolfgang Graf Vitzthum (Hrsg.): Völkerrecht. Walter de Gruyter, Berlin 1997, ISBN 3-11-012866-7.
- Michael Bothe, Allan Rosas, Natalino Ronzitti: The New Chemical Weapons Convention – Implementation and Prospects. Brill Academic Publishers, Leiden und Boston 1999, ISBN 9-04-111099-2.
- Michael Bothe, Horst Fischer, Christopher J. Greenwood, Dieter Fleck (Hrsg.): The Handbook of Humanitarian Law in Armed Conflicts. Oxford University Press, Oxford 2000, ISBN 0-19-829867-6.
