= Order of Meritorious Service =

Order of Malaysia

Awarded by the King of Malaysia
- Type: State Order
- Established: 2 May 1995
- Ribbon: Red with a blue central stripe bearing 2 yellow stripes and narrow white edges.
- Awarded for: Meritorious service to the country
- Status: Currently constituted
- Sovereign: Sultan Ibrahim, King of Malaysia
- Grades: Commander (PJN)
- Post-nominals: P.J.N.

Statistics
- First induction: 1995
- Last induction: 2022
- Total inductees: 1,146 Commanders; 69 Honorary Commanders

Precedence
- Next (higher): Order of Merit
- Next (lower): Order of Loyalty to the Royal Family of Malaysia
- The ribbon of the order

The Distinguished Order of Meritorious Service (Malay: Darjah Yang Mulia Jasa Negara) is a Malaysian federal award presented for meritorious service to the country.

== About the award ==
The order has one rank: Commander.

=== Commander ===
Commander of the Order of Meritorious Service (P.J.N.) (Malay: Panglima Jasa Negara).

The award recipient receives the title Datuk and his wife Datin.

This rank is limited to 200 living recipients at any time, excepting foreign citizens who are conferred honorary awards.

== Recipients ==
=== Commanders (PJN) ===
The Commanders receives the title Datuk and his wife Datin.

- 1995: A. Kadir bin Jasin
- 1995: A. Rahim bin Abdullah
- 1995: Dr. Abdullah bin Abdul Rahman
- 1995: Asmat bin Kamaludin
- 1995: Ismail bin Zakaria
- 1995: Leong Wye Keong
- 1995: Mohd Razali bin Abdul Rahman
- 1995: Mohd. Zain bin Abdul Rashid
- 1995: Nik Mohamed bin Nik Yaacob
- 1995: Dato' Dr. S.C.E. Abraham
- 1996: Dr. Abdul Aziz bin Sheikh Abdul Kadir
- 1996: Abdul Halim bin Ali
- 1996: Abdullah bin Hussain
- 1996: Ahmad Tajuddin bin Ali
- 1996: Aris bin Othman
- 1996: Baharun Azhar bin Raffiai
- 1996: C. Dutton
- 1996: Chang Boon Hoe
- 1996: Daniel Tajem
- 1996: Hamid Bugo
- 1996: Ismail bin Mansor
- 1996: Jaafar bin Ahmad
- 1996: K.S. Balakrishnan
- 1996: Khoo Eng Choo
- 1996: Kim Kok Khin
- 1996: Lee Teck Yuen
- 1996: Lim Thian Kiat
- 1996: M. Kayveas
- 1996: Mazlan Ahmad
- 1996: Maznah binti Abd. Hamid
- 1996: Mohamad bin Haji Aziz
- 1996: Mohamed Mydin Mohd Musa
- 1996: Mohd Ali bin Haji Hassan
- 1996: Mohd Khalil Mohd Noor
- 1996: Mustapha Kamal bin Abu Bakar
- 1996: Nor Azah binti Awin
- 1996: Othman bin Yusoff
- 1996: Paddy Bowie
- 1996: Raja Arshad bin Raja Tun Uda
- 1996: Syed Ahmad bin Syed Jamal
- 1996: Tan Chai Ho
- 1996: Tengku Mohd. Azzman Shariffadeen bin Tengku Ibrahim
- 1996: V.K. Chin
- 1996: Vivekananthan a/l M.V. Nathan
- 1996: Yong Poh Kon
- 1996: Yong Teck Lee
- 1996: Yusof Basiron
- 1996: Zainuddin Maidin
- 1997: Ab. Rahman bin Omar
- 1997: Abd. Rashid bin Haji Abdul Rahman
- 1997: Abdul Jabar bin Kamin
- 1997: Abdul Kadir bin Mohamad
- 1997: Abu Bakar bin Abd Hamid
- 1997: Abu Sahid bin Mohamed
- 1997: Ahmad Shahibuddin bin Hj. Mohd. Noor
- 1997: Ahmad Zabri bin Ibrahim
- 1997: G. Gnanalingam s/o Gunanathlingam
- 1997: Hadi bin Dato' Hashim
- 1997: Haron bin Siraj
- 1997: Hassan bin Abas
- 1997: Hod bin Parman
- 1997: Johan Jaafar
- 1997: Juhar Mahiruddin
- 1997: Kamaruddin Taib
- 1997: Khatijah binti Ahmad
- 1997: Lau Hieng Ing
- 1997: Lim Si Cheng
- 1997: Mazlan binti Othman
- 1997: Micheal Bong Thiam Joon
- 1997: Mohan Swami
- 1997: Mohd. Annas bin Mohd Nor
- 1997: Mohd. Nor bin Abd. Hamid
- 1997: Mohd. Sham bin Kasim
- 1997: Mohinder Singh
- 1997: Neo Tong Lee
- 1997: Nik Ibrahim bin Nik Abdullah
- 1997: Nik Mohd. Affandi bin Nik Yusoff
- 1997: Nik Safiah binti Abdul Karim
- 1997: Rajasingam a/l Mayilvaganam
- 1997: Hajah Sabariah binti Ahmad
- 1997: Syed Mokhtar Shah bin Syed Nor
- 1997: Yeoh Poh Hong
- 1997: Zahari bin Omar
- 1997: Zakiah Hanum binti Abdul Hamid
- 1998: Abdul Rahman bin Ramli
- 1998: Abdullah bin Haji Kuntom
- 1998: Ahmad Padzli bin Mohyiddin
- 1998: Alexius Ernald Delilkan
- 1998: Amirsham bin A. Aziz
- 1998: Ann binti Abdul Majeed
- 1998: Fong Weng Phak
- 1998: Geoffrey Yee Lung Fook
- 1998: Gerald Francis De Silva
- 1998: Govindaraj a/l Veradarajulu
- 1998: Jaafar bin Ismail
- 1998: Lim Cheng Ean
- 1998: Manikavasagam Jegathesan a/l Vasagam
- 1998: Matnor Daim
- 1998: Megat Zaharuddin bin Megat Mohd. Nor
- 1998: Mohamad Salleh bin Ismail
- 1998: Mohd. Zam bin Abdul Wahab
- 1998: Nuraizah binti Abdul Hamid
- 1998: Omar bin Mohamed Dan
- 1998: Ong Tee Keat
- 1998: P. Venugopal
- 1998: Paul Low Seng Kuan
- 1998: Ruby Lee
- 1998: Shahril bin Shamsuddin
- 1998: Steve Shim Lip Kiong
- 1998: Steven Tan Kok Hiang
- 1998: Syed Alwi bin Syed Nordin
- 1998: Tengku Mahaleel bin Tengku Ariff
- 1998: Ti Thiow Hee
- 1998: Umar bin Abu
- 1998: Vincent Lee Fook Long
- 1998: Yahya bin Ya'acob
- 1998: Amb. Zainal Abidin bin Alias
- 1998: Zakaria bin Abdul Hamid
- 1999: Abdul Aziz bin Muhamad
- 1999: Abdul Habib bin Mansur
- 1999: Abdul Hamid bin Haji Zainal Abidin
- 1999: Abdul Jamil bin Mohd. Ali
- 1999: Abdul Rashid bin Ngah
- 1999: Abdul Razak bin Hussain
- 1999: Abdul Shukor bin Abdullah
- 1999: Ahmad Zaharudin bin Idrus
- 1999: Ahmad Zaidee bin Laidin
- 1999: Anuwar bin Ali
- 1999: Azmi bin Abdul Wahab
- 1999: Chua Swee Chung
- 1999: Fawzia binti Dato' Abdullah
- 1999: Hanafi bin Ramli
- 1999: Hilaliah binti Haji Mohd. Yusof
- 1999: Ismail bin Adam
- 1999: Jaafar bin Abu Bakar
- 1999: Junus bin Wahid
- 1999: Lai Jaat Kong
- 1999: Lum Weng Kee
- 1999: Maulub bin Maamin
- 1999: Megat Burhainuddin bin Megat Abdul Rahman
- 1999: Mohamad Noor bin Abdul Rahim
- 1999: Mohamed Adnan bin Ali
- 1999: Mohamed Fadzil bin Mohd. Yunus
- 1999: Mohamed Hashim bin Ahmad Makaruddin
- 1999: Mohd. Zaini bin Abdul Rahman
- 1999: Muhammad Kamil bin Awang
- 1999: Muhammad Rais bin Abdul Karim
- 1999: Nawi bin Alias
- 1999: Oh Siew Nam
- 1999: Guneratnam a/l S.E. Guneratnam
- 1999: Raj Begum binti Abdul Karim
- 1999: Rajandram a/l Chellappah
- 1999: Ridwan bin Datuk Dr. Abu Bakar
- 1999: Robaayah binti Zambahari
- 1999: Sahadevan a/l Baliah
- 1999: Sambanthamurthi a/l Subramaniam
- 1999: Shahrir bin Nasir
- 1999: Sidek @ Abd. Aziz bin Muhammad
- 1999: Soh Chai Hock
- 1999: Ta Kin Yan
- 1999: Tan Check Hong
- 1999: Tay Ah Lek
- 1999: Wan Abdullah bin Wan Daud
- 1999: Zainal Abidin bin Abdul Hamid
- 1999: Zainal Aznam bin Mohd. Yusof
- 1999: Zaki bin Tun Azmi
- 2000: Ab. Sukor bin Shahar
- 2000: Abdul Aziz bin Hassan
- 2000: Abdul Halil bin Abd. Mutalif
- 2000: Abdul Karim bin Haron
- 2000: Abdul Wahab bin Haji Adam
- 2000: Abdullah bin Yusoff
- 2000: Ahmad Rejal Arbee bin Mohd Isa Arbee
- 2000: Alias bin Ali
- 2000: Anthony Ratos s/o Domingos Ratos
- 2000: Ashari bin Che Mat
- 2000: Azizan bin Ayob
- 2000: Bernard Wang Tsun Hao
- 2000: Chong Wei Yoon (William)
- 2000: David Chua Kok Tee
- 2000: Desmond Lim Siew Choon
- 2000: Fong Joo Chung
- 2000: Hamad Kama Piah bin Che Othman
- 2000: Hasmy bin Agam
- 2000: Ian Chia @ Chia Kay Meng
- 2000: Jagjit Singh a/l G.S. Sambhi
- 2000: K. Ravindran a/l C Kutty Krishnan
- 2000: Khalid bin Haji Husin
- 2000: Kisai bin Rahmat
- 2000: Krishnan a/l Packirisamy
- 2000: Lim Chee Wah
- 2000: Mohaiyani Shamsudin
- 2000: Mohd Napi @ Nakhaie bin Haji Ahmad
- 2000: Mohd Ramly Abu Bakar
- 2000: Mohd. Kassa bin Haji Abd. Aziz
- 2000: Mohd. Nasir bin Muda
- 2000: Najirah binti Mohd. Tassaduk Khan
- 2000: Nyanapandithan @ Gananapandythan a/l Muthandi @ M.G. Pandithan
- 2000: Omar bin Haji Othman
- 2000: Ooi Tuan Heo
- 2000: Osman bin Bakar
- 2000: Suleiman bin Mahmud
- 2000: Syed Muhamad bin Syed Abdul Kadir
- 2000: Teh Kian An
- 2000: Tengku Adnan Tengku Mansor
- 2000: Wan Kassim bin Ahmed
- 2000: Wan Lokman bin Dato' Wan Ibrahim
- 2000: Zainul Ariff bin Haji Hussain
- 2000: Zainun Aishah binti Ahmad
- 2001: Abdul Ghafir bin Abdul Hamid
- 2001: CP Datuk Abdul Hamid bin Mustapha
- 2001: Abdul Rafie bin Mahat
- 2001: Abdul Rahman bin Abdullah
- 2001: Abdul Razak bin Haji Ramli
- 2001: Abdul Razak bin K.P. Dawood Sultan
- 2001: Abdullah bin Ali
- 2001: Ali Abdul Kadir
- 2001: Anis bin Ahmad
- 2001: Arshad bin Hashim
- 2001: Athimulam a/l V Nadason
- 2001: Burhanuddin bin Ahmad Tajudin
- 2001: Chong Tho Chin
- 2001: Choot Ewe Seng
- 2001: Chua Soon Poh @ Chua Sum Poo
- 2001: Denis Ong Jiew Fook
- 2001: Fong Chin Tuck
- 2001: Ishak Imam Abas
- 2001: K. John Kuruvilla a/l Kuruvilla
- 2001: Lee Chong Meng
- 2001: Lim Kim Hong
- 2001: Mansor bin Haji Md. Jaafar
- 2001: Md Yusof Md Aslam
- 2001: Mohd Zulkifli bin Tan Sri Mohd Ghazali
- 2001: Mohmad Shaid bin Mohd Taufek
- 2001: Ng Kam Chiu
- 2001: Nik Mohd. Zain bin Haji Nik Yusof
- 2001: Roger Tan Kim Hock
- 2001: Shim Kong Yip
- 2001: Shuaib bin Haji Lazim
- 2001: Sim Peng Choon
- 2001: Siti Hadzar binti Mohd. Ismail
- 2001: Son Ting Kueh @ Soon Ting Sing
- 2001: Tiong Su Kouk
- 2001: Wan Awang bin Wan Yaacob
- 2001: Wan Hanafiah bin Wan Mohd Saman
- 2001: Wan Mohd Mahyiddin bin Wan Nawang
- 2001: CP Datuk Yaacob bin Md. Amin
- 2001: Yim Khai Kee
- 2001: Zainun binti Ali
- 2001: Zul Mukhshar bin Md Shaari
- 2002: Abd Manaf bin Haji Ahmad
- 2002: Abd. Hamid bin Abd. Rahman
- 2002: Abdul Hamid bin Ibrahim
- 2002: Abdullah bin Haji Jonid
- 2002: Abdullah bin Mohd. Tahir
- 2002: Abu Bakar bin Abdul Manap
- 2002: Abu Hassan bin Kendut
- 2002: Ahmed Tasir bin Lope Pihie
- 2002: Ampikaipakan a/l S. Kandiah
- 2002: Awang bin Jabar
- 2002: Chandrasekar a/l Suppiah
- 2002: Chen Lok Loi
- 2002: Clement Allan Skinner
- 2002: Frederick Jinu @ Fred
- 2002: Hadenan bin A. Jalil
- 2002: Haidar Ali bin Haji Sheikh Fadzir
- 2002: Halim bin Shafie
- 2002: Ismail bin Md Salleh
- 2002: Johan Thambu bin Abdul Malek
- 2002: Joseph Maduranayagam a/l M. Rajaratnam
- 2002: Justine anak Jenggot
- 2002: Khoo Che Wat @ Kew Che Wat
- 2002: Khoo Lay Hin
- 2002: Low Pooi Chai
- 2002: Mahamad Zabri bin Min
- 2002: Maruan bin Mohd Said
- 2002: Mazlan bin Ahmad
- 2002: Md. Hashim bin Yahaya
- 2002: Mohamad Omar bin Haji Yaakob
- 2002: Mohamad Shahir bin Abdullah
- 2002: Mohamed Arif bin Nun
- 2002: Mohamed Haniffa bin Haji Abdullah
- 2002: Mohamed Zaini bin Amran
- 2002: Mohd. Ghazali bin Haji Ahmad
- 2002: CP Dato' Mohd. Yusof bin Abd. Rahman
- 2002: Mustapha bin Taib
- 2002: Oh Chong Peng
- 2002: Ooi Han Eng
- 2002: Raja Malik Saripulazan bin Raja Kamaruzaman
- 2002: Saharan bin Haji Anang
- 2002: Salleh bin Mohd Nor
- 2002: Siti Maslamah binti Osman
- 2002: Sulaiman bin Mahbob
- 2002: Sulong bin Matjeraie
- 2002: Syed Tamin Ansari bin Syed Mohamed
- 2002: Wong Yit Ming
- 2002: Yap Chik Dong
- 2002: Yap Fung Kong
- 2002: Zubir bin Haji Ali
- 2003: Abdul Aziz bin Haji Husain
- 2003: Abdul Ghani bin Abdullah
- 2003: Abdul Monir bin Yaacob
- 2003: Abdul Rahman bin Idris
- 2003: Abdul Samad bin Haji Alias
- 2003: Abdullah bin Malim Baginda
- 2003: Abu bin Kamis
- 2003: Adenan bin Haji Mohamad Zain
- 2003: Ahmad Ghazi bin Haji Abdul Hamid
- 2003: Anuar bin Ahmad
- 2003: Arumugam a/l Ara Nachiappan
- 2003: Baba bin Md. Deni
- 2003: Choo Keng Kit
- 2003: Halimah binti Mohd Sadique
- 2003: Hii Yu Ho
- 2003: Ho Yoon Ping
- 2003: Ibrahim bin Haji Tambychek
- 2003: Iskandar Dzakurnain bin Badarudin
- 2003: Izhar bin Sulaiman
- 2003: Jemilah binti Haji Mahmood
- 2003: Kamarulzaman bin Darus
- 2003: Karim bin Abu Bakar
- 2003: Keizrul bin Abdullah
- 2003: Ketheeswaran a/l M. Kanagaratnam
- 2003: Khamil bin Jamil
- 2003: Krishnasamy a/l Shiman
- 2003: Lai Kuai Weng
- 2003: Lakshmanan Krishnan
- 2003: Liew Poon Siak
- 2003: Maglin a/l Dennis D' Cruz
- 2003: Mahmood bin Abd. Kadir
- 2003: Mastika Junaidah binti Husin
- 2003: Mohd Hashim bin Hassan
- 2003: Mohd Sidik bin Shaik Osman
- 2003: Mohd. Ismail bin Merican
- 2003: Muhamad bin Abdullah
- 2003: Ng Teck
- 2003: Nordin bin Ibrahim
- 2003: Ooi Chean See
- 2003: Rastam bin Mohd Isa
- 2003: Rohani binti Ramli
- 2003: Salleh Mat Som
- 2003: Sharifah Aminah binti Syed Ahmad
- 2003: Sheikh Ghazali bin Abdul Rahman
- 2003: Syarifah Aini binti Syed Jaafar
- 2003: Syed Abdillah bin Tan Sri Syed Abbas Alhabshee
- 2003: Syed Hussian bin Syed Junid
- 2003: Syed Jamil bin Syed Jaafar
- 2003: Vaithilingam a/l Ampalavanar
- 2003: Wan Junaidi Tuanku Jaafar
- 2003: Wan Mohd Najib bin Wan Mohamad
- 2003: Zainuddin bin Muhammad
- 2003: Zaitun Zawiyah binti Puteh
- 2003: Zulkipli Mat Noor
- 2004: Abd Rahim bin Haji Abdul
- 2004: Abdul Hamid bin Sawal
- 2004: Abdul Majid bin Haji Hussein
- 2004: Abdul Rahim bin Haji Hashim
- 2004: Abdul Sukor @ Shukor bin Haji Mohd Hassan
- 2004: Abu Huraira bin Abu Yazid
- 2004: Ahmad bin Abd. Talib
- 2004: Ahmad Khan bin Nawab Khan
- 2004: Ahmad Tajudin bin Mohd Jaafar
- 2004: Azlan bin Mohd Zainol
- 2004: Azman bin Abdul Rashid
- 2004: Azzat bin Kamaludin
- 2004: Che Yazid bin Che Seman @ Yazid Othman
- 2004: Chong Ten Soo @ Micheal Chong
- 2004: Faizah binti Mohd Tahir
- 2004: Ibrahim bin Abu Shah
- 2004: Ilyas Din
- 2004: Isahak bin Yeop Mohamad Shar
- 2004: Jaafar bin Hussin
- 2004: K. Anthony @ Merlin Kasimir
- 2004: K.Y. Mustafa
- 2004: Khalid bin Ramli
- 2004: Khamis bin Mohamed Som
- 2004: Kwong Tse Woon @ Yan Yik Woon
- 2004: Lakshmanan a/l Nachiappan
- 2004: Manogran @ Manoharan a/l Paramasivam
- 2004: Marzuki bin Mohammad Noor
- 2004: Mohamed Jin bin Samsudin @ Jins Shamsudin
- 2004: Mohd Khalid bin Mohd
- 2004: Mustafa bin Mansur
- 2004: Nik Sapeia bin Nik Yusof
- 2004: Othman bin Abd. Razak
- 2004: Othman bn Jais
- 2004: Rafiah binti Salim
- 2004: Rashpal Singh a/l Jeswant Singh
- 2004: Sivalingam a/l Munusamy
- 2004: Subrayan a/l A. Sellapan
- 2004: Tan Teck Poh @ Tan Ah Too
- 2004: Zaharah binti Ibrahim
- 2005: Ab. Rahim bin Ahmad
- 2005: Abd. Razak bin Abd. Latiff
- 2005: Ainon Marziah binti Wahi
- 2005: Aishah binti Shaikh Ahmad
- 2005: Alim bin Ariffin
- 2005: Chang Yok Ying @ Chang Yoke Ying
- 2005: Dzulkarnain bin Haji Abdul Rahman
- 2005: Faridah binti Alias
- 2005: Fateh Chand a/l Pars Ram
- 2005: Hamzah bin Hasan
- 2005: Ho Lim Teck
- 2005: Johari bin Abdul Ghani
- 2005: CP Datuk Kamarudin bin Md. Ali
- 2005: Kee Sue Sing
- 2005: Khairuddin bin Mat Yusof
- 2005: Mahendran a/l Thuraiappah
- 2005: Meriam binti Haji Ya'acob
- 2005: Mohamad Razali bin Mahusin
- 2005: Mohammed Zabidi bin Dasuki
- 2005: Mohan a/l A. Kandasamy
- 2005: Mohd Idris bin Tulis
- 2005: Mohd Nasir bin Ahmad
- 2005: Murphy Pakiam
- 2005: Nazariah binti Mohd Khalid
- 2005: Nor Ashikin binti Ahmad Mokhtar
- 2005: Poraviappan a/l Arunasalam Pillay
- 2005: R Sharifuddin Hizan bin R Zainal Abidin
- 2005: Raja Dato' Zaharaton binti Raja Zainal Abidin
- 2005: Ramlan bin Mohamed Ali
- 2005: Ramli bin Ibrahim
- 2005: Richard Riot Anak Jaem
- 2005: Rosli bin Mat Hassan
- 2005: Su Geok Yiam
- 2005: Syed Ahmad Helmy bin Syed Ahmad
- 2005: Teo Choo Kum
- 2005: Teoh Siang Chin
- 2005: Wan Abu Bakar bin Omar
- 2005: Zaharaah binti Shaari
- 2005: Zakaria bin Dato' Ahmad
- 2005: Zakaria bin Hashim
- 2006: Ab Hamid bin Othman
- 2006: Abd Aziz bin Mohammed
- 2006: Abdul Fatah bin Haji Iskandar
- 2006: Abdul Rahim bin Mohd Zin
- 2006: Abdullah bin Abdul Wahab
- 2006: Ahmad bin Haji Kemin
- 2006: Ahmad Othman Merican
- 2006: Ahmad Ridzwan bin Arshad
- 2006: Chew Peng Hong
- 2006: Denison Jayasooria
- 2006: Hairuddin bin Mohamed
- 2006: Hamid bin Ali
- 2006: Hamidon bin Haji Ali
- 2006: Harun bin Abdullah
- 2006: Hashim bin Ismail
- 2006: K.P. Gengadharan a/l C.R. Nair
- 2006: Kuthubul Zaman bin Bukhari
- 2006: Linton Albert
- 2006: Lo Kong Boon
- 2006: Mat Rabi bin Abu Samah
- 2006: Md Tap bin Salleh
- 2006: Mohamed Zain bin Mohamed Yusuf
- 2006: Mohd. Jais bin Ahmad
- 2006: Muhammad Ismail Jamaluddin
- 2006: Mustafa bin Osman
- 2006: Nik Mohd Zain bin Haji Omar
- 2006: Ow Chee Sheng @ Aw Hee Teng
- 2006: Rameli bin Musa
- 2006: Rosti Saruwono
- 2006: Ruslin Hasan
- 2006: Puan Salmiah binti A.G. Monong
- 2006: Siti Azizah binti Sheikh Abod
- 2006: Siti Mariah binti Haji Ahmad
- 2006: Tan Kim Leong
- 2006: Thulukanam a/l Sinnapayan
- 2006: Victor Wee Eng Lye
- 2006: Datuk Yaakob bin Haji Mohammad
- 2006: Yeow Kian Chai
- 2006: Zamani bin Md. Noor
- 2006: Zulkurnain bin Haji Awang
- 2007: Abang Abdul Wahap Abang Julai
- 2007: Abd. Aziz bin Yahya
- 2007: Abd. Malek bin Munip
- 2007: Abd. Shukor bin Abd. Rahman
- 2007: Abdol Azez bin Satta
- 2007: Abdul Azim bin Mohd. Zabidi
- 2007: Abdul Aziz bin Haji Jaafar
- 2007: Abdul Rahman bin Sulaiman
- 2007: Abdul Razak bin Mohd Ali
- 2007: Abdullah bin Karim
- 2007: Abdullah bin Shikh Mohamed
- 2007: Abu Bakar bin Abdul Karim
- 2007: Ahmad Fuad bin Ab. Aziz
- 2007: Anne Chin Hun Yee
- 2007: Christopher Wan Soo Kee
- 2007: Chua Teck Hwee
- 2007: Hii Tiong Kuoh
- 2007: Hong Lee Pe
- 2007: Idrus Harun
- 2007: Idris Jala
- 2007: Ismee bin Ismail
- 2007: Jamaliah binti Kamis
- 2007: Kamaruddin bin Mohamed Baria
- 2007: Kamaruzaman bin Che Mat
- 2007: Lee Heng
- 2007: Marimuthu a/l Nadason
- 2007: Masood bin Zainal Abidin
- 2007: Mohamad Ashfar bin Mohamad Ali
- 2007: Mohamad Danel @ Bujang bin Abong
- 2007: Mohamed Ariff bin Abdul Kareem
- 2007: Mohd Ghazali bin Dato' Haji Md Noor
- 2007: Mohd Ilyas bin Zainol Abidin
- 2007: Mohd Amir Sulaiman
- 2007: Mojilip bin Bumburing @ Wilfred
- 2007: Nasarudin bin Md Idris
- 2007: Nik Mustapha bin Raja Abdullah
- 2007: Noor Hisham Abdullah
- 2007: Noorhayati binti Kamaluddin
- 2007: Ooi Saw Choo
- 2007: Patawari bin Haji Patawe
- 2007: Raja Ahmad Zainuddin bin Raja Haji Omar
- 2007: Rajmah binti Hussain
- 2007: Sabapathy a/l Arumugam
- 2007: Sabaratnam a/l Kanapathy Pillai
- 2007: Samat bin Aripin
- 2007: Shamsul Amri bin Baharuddin
- 2007: Soon Choon Teck
- 2007: Suboh bin Mohd Yassin
- 2007: ubramaniam a/l K.V. Sathasivam
- 2007: Suhaidi bin Sulaiman
- 2007: Suhaimi bin Mohd Zain
- 2007: Suraiya Hani binti Tun Hussein
- 2007: Suslita binti Abdul Majid @ Kechik
- 2007: Syed Abdull Hafiz bin Syed A. Bakar
- 2007: Tajudin bin Ismail
- 2007: Tiong King Sing
- 2007: Victor Emmanuel
- 2007: Yong Ming Sang
- 2007: Zakiah binti Ahmad
- 2007: Zulkefli bin A. Hassan
- 2008: Ab Khalil bin Ab Hamid
- 2008: Abdul Ghafar bin Ramli
- 2008: Abdul Latiff bin S. Mirasa
- 2008: Abdul Rahman bin Hamid
- 2008: Abit Joo @ Billy Abit Joo
- 2008: Ahmad Said Hamdan
- 2008: Ahmad Zahri Jamil
- 2008: Ali bin Mohamed
- 2008: Bashir bin Haji Abu Bakar
- 2008: Chan Siaw Hee
- 2008: Chiam Heng Keng
- 2008: Chua Khen Siong @ Onong bin Choon Yong
- 2008: Faridah binti Abu Hassan
- 2008: Fatimah Abdul Majid
- 2008: Fatimah binti Md Deni
- 2008: Freddie Long Hoo Hin
- 2008: Harjit Singh a/l Pritam Singh
- 2008: Harun bin Hashim Mohd
- 2008: Hassan bin Haji Ahmad
- 2008: Hishamuddin bin Aun
- 2008: Jamilah binti Wahab
- 2008: Jasbir Singh a/l Amar Singh
- 2008: Kalimullah Masheerul Hassan
- 2008: Kamaruzaman bin Haji Mohd Nor
- 2008: Kee Ah Kau
- 2008: M.R. Gopala Krishnan C.R.K. Pillai
- 2008: Mohamed Thajudeen bin Abdul Wahab
- 2008: Encik Mohd Nazar bin Samad
- 2008: Encik Mohd Radzif bin Mohd Yunus
- 2008: Encik Mohd Shu'aib bin Haji Ishak
- 2008: Mohd. Amdan bin Kurish
- 2008: Mohtar bin Abas
- 2008: Musa bin Haji Sheikh Fadzir
- 2008: Ng Seing Liong
- 2008: Othman bin Hashim
- 2008: Encik Othman bin L Saad
- 2008: Paul Chan Tuck Hoong
- 2008: Ramli bin Sha'ari
- 2008: Ravindra Dass a/l Valoth Govindan
- 2008: Salim bin Hashim
- 2008: Samson David Maman
- 2008: Shahron bin Haji Ibrahim
- 2008: Shukry bin Mohd Salleh
- 2008: Subbaiyah a/l Palaniappan
- 2008: Syed Ali Tawfik Al-Attas
- 2008: Thomas George a/l M.S. George
- 2008: Wan Mohamed bin Wan Embong
- 2008: Yeop Junior bin Haji Yeop Adlan
- 2008: Encik Yew Tuan Chiew @ Yew Tuan Siew
- 2008: Zulkifeli bin Mohd. Zin
- 2009: Abdul Ghani Minhat
- 2009: Abdul Rahman bin Haji Khamis
- 2009: Abdullah bin Abdul Majid
- 2009: Adinan bin Maning
- 2009: Choo Yuen May
- 2009: Gopal Sri Ram
- 2009: Hasni bin Harun
- 2009: Hussin Ismail
- 2009: Ilani binti Datuk Isahak
- 2009: Lai Chung Wah
- 2009: Lee Kim Shin
- 2009: Manharlal a/l Ratilal
- 2009: Mashuri Zainal
- 2009: Md Hamzah bin Md Kassim
- 2009: Md Mukhtar bin Boerhannoeddin
- 2009: Mohamad Nor Khalid
- 2009: Mohamed Mackeen bin Abdul Majid
- 2009: Mohammed Noordin bin Ali
- 2009: Mohd Badlisham bin Ghazali
- 2009: Mohd Basri bin Wahid
- 2009: Mohd Noor Amin bin Mohd Noor Khan
- 2009: Mohd Ghazali bin Mohd Yusoff
- 2009: Mohd Zain bin Mohd Dom
- 2009: Nik Azman bin Mohamed Zain
- 2009: Nik Moustpha bin Haji Nik Hassan
- 2009: Noor Zahidi bin Omar
- 2009: Norah binti Abd Rahman
- 2009: Normah binti Md Yusof
- 2009: Osman bin Bungsu
- 2009: Raja Mohamed Affandi bin Raja Mohamed Noor
- 2009: Shad Saleem Faruqui
- 2009: Shaheen Chugtai bin Mirza Habib Jan
- 2009: Siw Chun a/p Eam
- 2009: Sulaiman bin Abdullah
- 2009: Thamby Raja
- 2009: Vincent Ng Kim Khoay
- 2009: Wan Zulkiflee bin Wan Ariffin
- 2009: Wilfred Rata Nissom
- 2009: Yee Ming Seng
- 2009: Yii Ming Tang
- 2009: Zihim bin Mohd Hassan
- 2010: Aaron Ago Dagang
- 2010: Ab Aziz bin Kaprawi
- 2010: Ab. Rauf Bin Yusoh
- 2010: Abd Jabar bin Che Nai
- 2010: Ahmad Jazlan bin Yaakub
- 2010: Ahmad Kamarulzaman bin Haji Ahmad Badaruddin
- 2010: Aishah Ong
- 2010: Alexander Nanta Linggi
- 2010: Allatif bin Mohd Noor
- 2010: Azizah binti Haji Arshad
- 2010: Che Md Nawawi bin Ismail
- 2010: Chua Kim Chuan
- 2010: Ghazali bin T.V. Ahmad Kutty
- 2010: Gnanasambantham a/l Doraisamy
- 2010: Goh Ah Bah
- 2010: Hardew Kaur a/p Hazar Singh
- 2010: Henrynus Amin
- 2010: Hussin bin Ahamad
- 2010: Datuk Jamil bin Sulong
- 2010: Jeyaindran a/l Tan Sri Dr. Sinnadurai
- 2010: Latifah binti Datuk Abu Mansor
- 2010: Lee Ah Fat
- 2010: Lily Yong Lee Lee
- 2010: Mohamed Azman bin Yahya
- 2010: Mohammad Izat bin Lebai Hasan
- 2010: Mohd Nasir bin Ibrahim @ Ibrahim Fikri
- 2010: Mohd Radzi bin Abdul Rahman
- 2010: Mohd Yusof bin Haji Zainal Abiden
- 2010: Nadraja a/l Ratnam
- 2010: Najib bin Haji Abdullah
- 2010: Ng See Tiong
- 2010: Parmjit Singh a/l Meva Singh
- 2010: Puteh Rukiah binti Abd Majid
- 2010: Rajakupal a/l Sinathamby
- 2010: Sheah Zwat Tsang @ Vincent Shia
- 2010: Encik Swin bin Jema'ah @ Aidan Wing
- 2010: Teo Chee Kang
- 2010: Teo Geck Heng
- 2011: A. Rahman bin A. Jamal
- 2011: Ab Aziz bin Kasim
- 2011: Abd Aziz bin Jamaluddin
- 2011: Abdul Azeez bin Abdul Rahim
- 2011: Abdul Hadi bin Hussin
- 2011: Dr. Abdul Kadir bin Taib
- 2011: Abdul Shariff bin Hamid
- 2011: Abdul Wahab bin Abdullah
- 2011: Abdullah bin Ahmad
- 2011: Ahmad bin Haji Kabit
- 2011: Ahmad Hasbullah Mohd Nawawi
- 2011: Albert Boyou
- 2011: Mendiang Arumugam a/l Rengasamy
- 2011: Ahmad bin Fateh Mohamed
- 2011: Chan Seng Khai
- 2011: Che Azizuddin bin Che Ismail
- 2011: Cheng Lai Hock
- 2011: Govindan a/l Kunchamboo
- 2011: Haji Hanafi bin Haji Mamat
- 2011: Haji Ibrahim bin Ahmad
- 2011: Jaafar bin Mohamad
- 2011: John Sikie ak Tayai
- 2011: K D Siva Kumar a/l Krishnadas
- 2011: Kamilia binti Dato' Ibrahim
- 2011: Kenny Ng Bee Ken
- 2011: Khor Ing Hua @ Khor Chew Hing
- 2011: Koh Chai @ Koh Chee Chai
- 2011: Krishnan a/l Maniam
- 2011: Lim Boon Siong
- 2011: Lim Eng Kok
- 2011: Lim Ming Hoo
- 2011: Ling Kong Mee
- 2011: Looi Lai Meng
- 2011: Magendran a/l M. Munisamy
- 2011: Mizan Adiliah binti Ahmad Ibrahim
- 2011: Mohamad Salim bin Fateh Din
- 2011: Mohanadas a/l Nagappan
- 2011: Mohd Ariffin bin Mohd Rosli
- 2011: Mohd Nawawi bin Awang
- 2011: Mohd Omar bin Mustapha
- 2011: Mohd Sukor bin Abd Manan
- 2011: Munusamy a/l Mareemuthu
- 2011: Ng Ah Chua @ Ng Liang Chua
- 2011: Ng Moon Hing
- 2011: Ng Siew Lai
- 2011: Noriyah binti Ahmad
- 2011: Norma binti Mansor
- 2011: Raja Azahar bin Raja Abdul Manap
- 2011: Rajagobal a/l Krishnasamy
- 2011: Encik Sia Hiong Ngee @ Sia Hiong Ngie
- 2011: Siti Jeliha @ Zaleha binti Hussin
- 2011: Stephen Rundi anak Utom
- 2011: Sunny Goh Teck Chin
- 2011: Prof. Syed Omar bin Syed Mohamad
- 2011: Tan Kean Soon
- 2011: Ter Leong Yap
- 2011: Tun Majid bin Tun Hamzah
- 2011: Wan Selamah binti Wan Sulaiman
- 2011: Yap Kea Ping
- 2011: Yii Chi Hau
- 2011: Zabidah binti Ismail
- 2011: Zainol bin Othman
- 2011: Zalekha binti Hassan
- 2011: Zulkifli Zainal Abidin
- 2012: SAC A. Navaratnam
- 2012: Abdullah Sani bin Abd. Karim
- 2012: Achaiah Kumar Rao a/l Subramaniam
- 2012: Haji Ahmad Husaini bin Sulaiman
- 2012: Haji Ahmad Phesal bin Talib
- 2012: Ahmad Shalimin bin Ahmad Shafie
- 2012: Azmi bin Che Hussain
- 2012: Bakry bin Hamzah
- 2012: Nelson Balang Rining
- 2012: Christopher Lee Kwok Choong
- 2012: Doris Sophia ak Brodi
- 2012: Faisyal bin Datuk Yusof Hamdain Diego
- 2012: Frederick Bayoi anak Manggie
- 2012: Goh Ah Lek
- 2012: Halimaton binti Hamdan
- 2012: Hii Chii Kok @ Hii Chee Kok
- 2012: Hoo Seong Chang
- 2012: Ismail bin Ibrahim
- 2012: Ismet bin Suki
- 2012: J.J. Raj (Jr.)
- 2012: Jamil bin Haji Osman
- 2012: Jusoh bin Daud
- 2012: Kwan Wing Hung
- 2012: Mohamad Fuzi Harun
- 2012: Mohamad Jamil bin Mohamad Hassan
- 2012: Mohamed Rafiq bin Mohamed Ibrahim
- 2012: Mohammed Saffari bin Mohammed Haspani
- 2012: Haji Mohd Aiseri bin Alias
- 2012: Mohd Anuar bin Taib
- 2012: Mohd Bakri Mohd Zinin
- 2012: Mohd Faizal bin Zainol
- 2012: Muhamad Chali @ Zamani bin Abdul Ghani
- 2012: Muhammad bin Ibrahim
- 2012: Muhammad Uthman El-Muhammady
- 2012: Murugesan a/l Sinnandavar
- 2012: Ngah bin Senik
- 2012: Nityananthan a/l Munusamy
- 2012: Noharuddin bin Nordin @ Harun
- 2012: Nor Azman bin Hamidun
- 2012: Ong Gaik Thiang
- 2012: Ong Siew Swan
- 2012: Pau Chiong Ung
- 2012: Rasli bin Basir
- 2012: Rebecca Fatima Sta Maria
- 2012: Roslan Saad
- 2012: Encik Samson Chin Chee Tsu
- 2012: Shahril Ridza bin Ridzuan
- 2012: Encik Shahrol Azral bin Ibrahim Halmi
- 2012: Encik Sundra Rajoo a/l Nadarajah
- 2012: Suraya binti Yaacob
- 2012: Syed Abu Bakar bin S Mohsin Almohdzar
- 2012: Syed Ali bin Mohamed Alattas
- 2012: Syed Izuan bin Syed Kamarulbahrin
- 2012: Syed Jaafar bin Syed Aznan
- 2012: Haji Tahir bin Mohd Taat
- 2012: Tan Chik Heok
- 2012: Tan Chong Meng @ Chan Chong Meng
- 2012: Thavarajah a/l Chinniah
- 2012: Yap Sooi Yin
- 2012: Yew Jen Kie
- 2012: Zaini bin Ujang
- 2012: Zakaria bin Abd Rahman
- 2012: Zoal Azha bin Yusof
- 2012: Zulkiple Kassim
- 2013: Abd Razak bin Md Yusoff
- 2013: Abdul Kadir bin P.A. Moidutty
- 2013: Abdul Malik bin Ishak
- 2013: Ackbal Abdul Samad
- 2013: Ahmad Kamal Yahya
- 2013: Ahmad Suhaimi bin Hashim
- 2013: Andrew Lim Tatt Keong
- 2013: Ang Chai Fah @ Ang Chai Wah
- 2013: Anwari bin Suri
- 2013: Awalan bin Abdul Aziz
- 2013: Haji Awang bin Sariyan
- 2013: Boon Weng Siew
- 2013: Datin C Josephine Anne
- 2013: Chai Meng Kui
- 2013: Che Mohd. Hashim bin Abdullah
- 2013: Chiau Beng Teik
- 2013: Chiew Yen Fong @ Chiew Yen Chew
- 2013: Jimmy Choo Yeang Keat
- 2013: Chung Hon Cheong
- 2013: Devanand a/l C Mangharam
- 2013: Franki a/l Anthony Dass
- 2013: Ganendran Sarvananthan
- 2013: Gulam Hussin bin Gulam Haniff
- 2013: Hamim bin Haji Samuri
- 2013: Hashim bin Wahir
- 2013: SAC Ishak bin Kasim (B)
- 2013: Jamil bin Bidin
- 2013: Joseph Mauh ak Ikeh
- 2013: Kamaruddin bin Mattan (B)
- 2013: Kamarudin bin Hussin
- 2013: Kamarudin bin Meranun
- 2013: Lim Ah Nge
- 2013: Lim Kim Chong
- 2013: Low Teh Hian
- 2013: Madinah binti Mohamad
- 2013: Mohamad Zaki bin Hamzah
- 2013: Mohamed Faroz bin Mohamed Jakel
- 2013: Mohamed Mustafa bin Ishak
- 2013: Mohammad Kamal bin Yan Yahaya
- 2013: Mohd Fadzil bin Mohd Khir
- 2013: Mohd Hassin @ Mohd Hashim bin Daud @ Mohd Daud
- 2013: Mohd. Hafarizam bin Harun
- 2013: Muhammad Safian bin Ismail
- 2013: Noriah binti Mahat
- 2013: Norminshah binti Sabirin
- 2013: Ong Hong Peng
- 2013: Osman bin Haji Jamal @ Jamar
- 2013: Othman bin Haji Mahmood
- 2013: R Moorthy a/l Ramasamy
- 2013: Radin Malleh
- 2013: Rahamat Bivi binti Yusoff
- 2013: Soma Sundaram a/l V Ramasamy
- 2013: Subramaniam a/l Veruthasalam
- 2013: Syed Ismail Syed Azizan
- 2013: Tan Say Jim
- 2013: Tan Teow Choon
- 2013: Tuanku Balanggung
- 2013: Tunku Sofiah binti Tunku Md Jewa
- 2013: Wahbi bin Haji Junaidi
- 2013: William Tanyuh anak Nub
- 2013: Wong Koon Mun
- 2013: Wong Thien Fook
- 2013: Yap Kau @ Yap Yeow Ho
- 2013: Zang Toi
- 2014: Abd Hadi bin A. Rashid
- 2014: Abdul Aziz bin Ibrahim
- 2014: Abu Hanifah bin Noordin
- 2014: Ahmad Kamaruzaman bin Mohamed Baria
- 2014: Ainoon binti Othman
- 2014: Azailiza binti Mohd Ahad
- 2014: Azimah binti Omar
- 2014: Che Akmar bin Mohd. Nor TUDM
- 2014: Cheng Joo An
- 2014: Doraisingam a/l Rengasamy
- 2014: Engku Nor Faizah binti Engku Atek
- 2014: Gan Eng Hong
- 2014: Gobalakrishnan a/l Narayanasamy
- 2014: Hasanah binti Ab Hamid
- 2014: Himmat Singh a/l Ralla Singh
- 2014: Ismail Mohamed Said
- 2014: Jayasiri Jayasena
- 2014: Johari Siregar bin Adnan
- 2014: Kenneth Vun @ Vun Yun Liun
- 2014: Kong Woon Jun
- 2014: Lamien Sawiyo
- 2014: Lau Kueng Chai
- 2014: Lau Pang Heng
- 2014: Liang Teck Meng
- 2014: Senator Lihan Jok
- 2014: Mazeni bin Alwi
- 2014: Md Nizam bin Md Sherif @ Md Sharif
- 2014: Md Yahaya bin Haji Basimin
- 2014: Metah @ Michael bin Asang
- 2014: Michael S Malanjun (SITOM)
- 2014: Mohammed Mosin bin Abdul Razak
- 2014: Mohd Daud bin Bakar
- 2014: Mohd Nardin Awang
- 2014: Mohd Nizom bin Sairi
- 2014: Mohd Puad Zarkashi
- 2014: Mohd Zaki bin Haji Mokhtar
- 2014: Nadarajah a/l Annamalai
- 2014: Nasaruddin bin Othman
- 2014: Nik Norzrul Thani bin N. Hassan Thani
- 2014: Palaniappan
- 2014: Paul Igai
- 2014: Puan Hajah Rahmani @ Rohani binti Abdullah
- 2014: Rajasingam a/l Murugasu
- 2014: Richard Eng
- 2014: Rohani binti Abdullah
- 2014: Rokiah binti Hashim
- 2014: Rosman bin Haji Hasan
- 2014: Salman bin L. Ahmad
- 2014: Sharifah Zarah binti Syed Ahmad
- 2014: Sim Kui Hian
- 2014: Suseela Menon a/p T.A.S Menon
- 2014: Syed Unan Mashri bin Syed Abdullah
- 2014: Tay Puay Chuan
- 2014: Tay Swee Gim
- 2014: Teo Eng Tee @ Teo Kok Chee
- 2014: Tong Poh Keow
- 2014: Wahid bin Omar
- 2014: William @ Nyallau anak Badak
- 2014: William Rangit Stevenson
- 2014: Yahaya bin Ibrahim
- 2014: Yek Siew Hui
- 2014: Zainol Izzet bin Mohamed Ishak
- 2014: Zainuddin bin Haji Ibrahim
- 2014: Zainudin bin A Kadir
- 2015: Alfred Midoli Lojitan
- 2015: Amer Hamzah bin Mohd Yunus
- 2015: Annies bin Md Ariff
- 2015: Asharuddin bin Ahmad
- 2015: Atan bin Aman
- 2015: Badariah binti Sahamid
- 2015: Chen Thin Kong
- 2015: Goh Ah Ling
- 2015: Ho Jia Lit @ Charlie
- 2015: Husni Zai bin Yaacob
- 2015: Janggu anak Banyang
- 2015: Karuppanan a/l M. Malairaja
- 2015: Khairiyah binti Abd Muttalib
- 2015: Kong Hoi Chieng
- 2015: Lee Hwa Cheng
- 2015: Liew Kooi Leng
- 2015: Lim Kok Boon
- 2015: Lim Tow Boon
- 2015: Lok Yim Pheng
- 2015: Loo Took Gee
- 2015: Mansor bin Musa
- 2015: Mat Noor bin Nawi
- 2015: Matrona D'Cruz a/p Tharsis D' Cruz
- 2015: Mhd Amin Nordin bin Abd Aziz
- 2015: Mohamed Nizam bin Mohamed Jakel
- 2015: Mohd Noh bin Dalimin @ Dolimin
- 2015: Mohd Yaakub bin Haji Johari
- 2015: Mohd Zain bin Ahmad
- 2015: Mortadza Nazarene
- 2015: Muhammad Fuad Abu Zarim
- 2015: Muhammad Yadzan bin Mohammad
- 2015: Nagarajan a/l N. Marie
- 2015: Noor Azlan bin Ghazali
- 2015: Norliza binti Abdul Rahim
- 2015: Omar bin Osman
- 2015: Prasad Sandosham Abraham
- 2015: Redza Rafiq bin Abdul Razak
- 2015: Rosli bin Mohd Ali
- 2015: Sabri bin Adam
- 2015: Salmah Hayati binti Ghazali
- 2015: Subramaniam a/l Nachimuthu
- 2015: Sulaiman bin Mohd Hassan
- 2015: Tan Kor Mee
- 2015: Tang Vee Mun
- 2015: Tee Guan Pian
- 2015: Ugak anak Kumbong
- 2015: Wan Hamidah binti Wan Ibrahim
- 2015: Wan Seri @ Wan Asiah binti Ahmad
- 2015: Wong Aik Loung @ Wong Yii Ling
- 2015: Wong Lai Sum
- 2015: Yeow Chin Kiong
- 2015: Yong Oui Fah
- 2015: Zahri bin Haji Edin
- 2015: Zainal Abidin bin Abdul Rahim
- 2015: Zainudin bin Ibrahim
- 2015: Zulkefli bin Haji Sharif
- 2016: Abdul Ghani bin Salleh
- 2016: Abdul Mutalib bin Ab Wahab
- 2016: Abdul Rahman bin Ibrahim
- 2016: Abdul Razak bin Abdul Rahman
- 2016: Adanan bin Mohamed Hussain
- 2016: Almalena Sharmila binti Johan Thambu
- 2016: Amhari Efendi bin Nazaruddin
- 2016: Ang Chin Tat
- 2016: Anne Rachel John
- 2016: Anthony Kevin Morais
- 2016: Asma binti Ismail
- 2016: Awg Bujang bin Awg Antek
- 2016: Azizan binti Baharuddin
- 2016: Bakar bin Din
- 2016: Cha Hoo Peng
- 2016: Chan Wei Beng
- 2016: Che Muhaya binti Haji Mohamad
- 2016: Chin Shu Ying
- 2016: Chiong Geok Eng @ Chao Geok Eng
- 2016: Daud Amatzin
- 2016: Ding Kuong Hiing
- 2016: Puan Hajah Faridah binti Haji Mat Saman
- 2016: Puan Fatimah binti Sulaiman
- 2016: Encik Fazlur-Rahman bin Zainuddin
- 2016: YBhg. Dato' (Dr.) Hafsah binti Hashim
- 2016: Harmindar Singh Dhaliwal
- 2016: Iskandar bin Mohd Kaus
- 2016: Jalil bin Marzuki
- 2016: Jamaluddin bin Mohd Radzi
- 2016: Juani @ Johnny bin Mositun
- 2016: Junainah binti Abd Hamid
- 2016: Kamalul Arifin bin Othman
- 2016: Kamardin bin Hashim
- 2016: Kang Hua Keong
- 2016: Kiat Swee Sung
- 2016: Kumaran a/l Nadaraja
- 2016: Kwan Foh Kwai
- 2016: Leelavathi a/p K Govindasamy
- 2016: Lim Chai Beng
- 2016: Ling Sii Kiong
- 2016: M. Chareon Sae Tang @ Tang Whye Aun
- 2016: Mazli Mohan bin Alias
- 2016: Md Jais bin Haji Sarday
- 2016: Mohamad bin Dolmat
- 2016: Mohamad Ezam bin Mohd Nor
- 2016: Mohamed Ilyas bin Pakeer Mohamed
- 2016: Mohammad Tahir bin Rahat Khan
- 2016: Mohd Faudzi bin Haji Che Mamat
- 2016: Mohd Osman bin Mohd Jailu
- 2016: Mohd. Farid bin Mohd. Adnan
- 2016: Nik Airina binti Nik Jaffar
- 2016: Noordin bin Yaani
- 2016: Nor Azam bin M. Taib
- 2016: Noraini binti Soltan
- 2016: Norazam Shah bin Ibrahim
- 2016: Nordin bin Mat Yusoff
- 2016: Ong Lam Kiat
- 2016: Ooi Kee Liang
- 2016: Quek Chee Hiang @ Quek Suan Hiang
- 2016: Ramlan bin Abdul Malek
- 2016: Roslan bin Abdul Rahman
- 2016: Sakthivel a/l Alagappan
- 2016: See To Choong
- 2016: Shahnaz binti Murad
- 2016: Sharif bin Haron
- 2016: Sharuddin bin Omar
- 2016: Sing Sai Hiang
- 2016: Sivanyanam a/l Sinnathamby
- 2016: Soon Ruey
- 2016: Sundaran a/l Annamalai
- 2016: Supramaniam a/l Ramalingam
- 2016: Tai Hee
- 2016: Tan Choon Peow
- 2016: Tan Kok Hong @ Tan Yi
- 2016: Teo Kwan Chin @ Teo Mau Sing
- 2016: Tiong Yap Choon
- 2016: Toh Chiew Peng
- 2016: Wan Mohammad Khair-il Anuar bin Wan Ahmad
- 2016: Wee Chong Yan
- 2016: Zainal Ariffin bin Azizi
- 2016: Zaleha Abdul Rahman
- 2016: Zulkifli Abdullah
- 2017: Abdul Puhat Mat Nayan
- 2017: Abdullah Hasnan bin Kamaruddin
- 2017: Ahmad Lai bin Bujang
- 2017: Ali bin A Habeeb Rahman
- 2017: Anuwi bin Hassan
- 2017: Azam Baki
- 2017: Azhari Rosman
- 2017: Azih bin Muda
- 2017: Barry Tan Chong Liang
- 2017: Che Mohamad Zulkifly bin Jusoh
- 2017: Chia Hui Yen
- 2017: Irmohizam bin Ibrahim
- 2017: Khoo Soo Seang
- 2017: Krishnan a/l Kunjan
- 2017: Lee Chong Wei
- 2017: Ling Chui Zhen
- 2017: Liwan Lagang
- 2017: Loke Ah Hong
- 2017: Makin @ Marcus Mojigoh
- 2017: Md Rozai bin Shafian
- 2017: Md Shuhaime bin Abd Rahman
- 2017: Mohamad Nageeb bin Ahmad Abdul Wahab
- 2017: Mohamad Roslan Mohamad Ramli
- 2017: Mohd Mokhtar Mohd Shariff
- 2017: Muhammad Sabtu Osman
- 2017: Mutang Tagal
- 2017: Ng Loi Tect
- 2017: Ngan Yun Kiang
- 2017: Nicol Ann David
- 2017: Norjan binti Abdul Hamid
- 2017: Parameswaran Ganason
- 2017: Periasamy a/l Munisamy
- 2017: Raman a/l L Muniandy
- 2017: Ramlan bin Ibrahim
- 2017: Rawisandran a/l Narayanan
- 2017: Rosni binti Sohar
- 2017: S Kanan a/l G Suppiah
- 2017: Sebastian Ting Chiew Yew
- 2017: Shanmugam a/l Gopala Krishnan
- 2017: Siringan bin Gubat @ Aliance
- 2017: Siti Zauyah binti Md Desa
- 2017: Soh Chee Whye
- 2017: Stephen Chung Hian Guan
- 2017: Tan Theng Hooi
- 2017: Wong Fung Kiang
- 2017: Woon See Chin
- 2017: Yogeesvaran a/l Kumaraguru
- 2017: Zohari Akob
- 2017: Yasmin Mahmood
- 2019: Abd Latif bin Mohmod
- 2019: Abdul Halim bin Haji Jalal
- 2019: Acryl Sani Abdullah Sani
- 2019: Ahmad 'Asri bin Abdul Hamid
- 2019: Ahmad Sharifuddin bin Mohd Asari
- 2019: Akbar bin Samon
- 2019: Azhar bin Azizan
- 2019: Azizan bin Md Delin
- 2019: Chandran a/l Rama Muthy
- 2019: Hamidin bin Haji Mohd Amin
- 2019: Iskandar bin Datuk Abdul Malik
- 2019: Kamarulzaman bin Mohd Othman
- 2019: Khairuddin bin Abu Hassan
- 2019: Khairul Anuar bin Yahya
- 2019: Lim Siow Jin
- 2019: Mohamed Elias bin Abu Bakar
- 2019: Mohd Azraai bin Kassim
- 2019: Narayanan a/l Kuppusamy
- 2019: Nor Azri bin Zulfakar
- 2019: Rosli bin Ab. Rahman
- 2019: Rusli bin Ramli
- 2019: See Mee Chun
- 2019: Sheikh Mokhsin bin Sheikh Hassan
- 2019: Siti Hamisah binti Tapsir
- 2019: Zainab binti Omar
- 2019: Supang Lian
- 2019: Taufiq Yap Yun Yin
- 2019: Wahid bin Razzaly
- 2019: Ya'akop bin Koming
- 2019: Zulkifli bin Mohamad
- 2019: Zulkifli bin Omar
- 2020: Abd Rahim bin Jaafar
- 2020: Abd Rahman bin Sbri
- 2020: Ahmad Fadzil bin Mohamad Hani
- 2020: Aris Adi Tan bin Abdullah
- 2020: Ganesh a/l Navaratnam
- 2020: Habibah binti Abdul Rahim
- 2020: Hasagaya bin Abdullah
- 2020: Huzir bin Mohamed
- 2020: Jaul anak Samion
- 2020: Lokman Hakim bin Ali
- 2020: Low Gee Teong
- 2020: Mohamed Farid bin Abu Hassan
- 2020: Mohamed Salleh bin Bajuri
- 2020: Mohd Asghar Khan Goriman Khan
- 2020: Mohd Gazali bin Abas
- 2020: Mohd Nazir bin Mami
- 2020: Mohd Rabin bin Basir
- 2020: Muhammad Shahrul Ikram bin Yaakob
- 2020: Muhammad Suhaimi bin Yahya
- 2020: Nazran bin Muhammad
- 2020: Nik Azman bin Nik Abdul Majid
- 2020: Noor Zilan bin Mohamed Noor
- 2020: Normah Hanum binti Ibrahim
- 2020: Md Amin bin Muslan
- 2020: Ravinthran a/l N Paramaguru
- 2020: Safar bin Untong
- 2020: Suhaimi bin Haji Mohd Zuki
- 2020: Wan Mohd Shaharir bin Wan Abd Jalil
- 2020: Zamri bin Yahya
- 2021: Nantha Balan a/l E.S Moorthy
- 2021: To' Puan Azian binti Mohd Aziz
- 2021: Ahmad Terrirudin bin Mohd Salleh
- 2021: Zunika binti Mohamed
- 2021: Nor Azimah binti Abdul Aziz
- 2021: Mohamad Zulkefly bin Sulaiman
- 2021: Jayum anak Jawan
- 2021: Marzuki bin Mohamad
- 2021: Darryl Goon Siew Chye
- 2021: Abdul Razak bin Musa
- 2021: Ahmad Parveez bin Haji Ghulam Kadir
- 2021: Mokhzani bin Ismail
- 2021: Mohmed Misbun bin Dato' Haji Sedek
- 2021: Yee Yang Chien
- 2021: Mohamad Idham bin Nawawi
- 2021: Lam Kai Seng
- 2021: Tengku Muhammad Taufik bin Tengku Aziz
- 2021: Gapari bin Katingan
- 2022: Rostam Affendi bin Dato' Salleh
- 2022: Azhahari Kamal bin Ramli
- 2022: Azman bin Mohd Yusof
- 2022: Sallehuddin bin Ishak
- 2022: Jojie Samuel a/l M C Samuel
- 2022: Hidayat bin Abdul Hamid
- 2022: Mohd Mustafa bin Abdul Aziz
- 2022: Chew Cheng Lian
- 2022: Yeoh Oon Tean
- 2022: Foo Kok Keong
- 2022: Mohamad Akram bin Laldin
- 2022: Adif bin Zulkifli
- 2022: Syed Hussain bin Syed Husman
- 2022: Tengku Muhaini
- 2022: Mohammad bin Ab. Rahman
- 2022: Abdul Rahman Ayob
- 2022: Mohammad Salleh bin Haji Osman
- 2022: Sabri Zali
- 2022: Mardzuki bin Muhammad
- 2022: Shafien bin Mamat
- 2022: Zaini bin Jass
- 2022: Abd Jalil bin Hassan
- 2022: Wan Hassan bin Wan Ahmad

== Honorary Recipients ==
=== Honorary Commanders ===
The Honorary Commanders also receives the title Datuk and his wife Datin.

- 1996: Eduardo Alberto Sadous
- 1996: Lin Cheng Yuan
- 1997: Takeshi Furuta
- 1997: Yoichi Morishita
- 1998: Chao Ting Tsung
- 1998: Jean-Claude Paye
- 1998: Mihaela Y. Smith
- 1998: Norio Ohga
- 1998: Yoshiko Y. Nakano
- 1999: Yugi Kawata
- 2000: Datuk Laksamana TNI-AL Achmad Sutjipto
- 2000: Datuk Seri Kolonel Md. Jaafar bin Haji Abdul Aziz
- 2000: Datuk Peter Jenkins
- 2001: Edgar E. Nordman
- 2001: John F. Coyne
- 2001: Narongvich Thaitong
- 2002: Jeffery Sandragesan
- 2003: Eiro Sakamoto
- 2003: Elihu Lauterpacht
- 2003: James Richard Crawford
- 2003: Nicholas Zefferys
- 2003: Nicolaas Jan Schrijver
- 2003: Peter Michael Wentworth
- 2003: Timothy Garland
- 2003: Yoshihiro Uehara
- 2003: Yukio Shohtoku
- 2004: Ernest Ziegler Bower IV
- 2004: Helmut Baur
- 2004: Jurgen Heiderman
- 2004: Kunio Nakamura
- 2004: Manuel Condeminas
- 2004: Nurset Arsel
- 2004: Omar Muhieddine Jundi
- 2004: Thomas Anthonius Haziroglou
- 2005: A.K.M. Shahidul Islam
- 2005: Husamettin Sinlak
- 2005: Issei Nomura
- 2005: Park Myung Jae
- 2005: Winai Phattiyakul
- 2007: Colin Campbell
- 2007: Des Alwi Abu Bakar
- 2007: Donald Eugene Blake
- 2007: James Chao Yuan Hsiu
- 2007: Richard Leete
- 2007: Samir Alkour
- 2008: Tristan Beauchamp Russell
- 2009: Eric Tan
- 2009: Peter Richard Brokenshire
- 2009: Syed Ahmad bin Alwee Alsree
- 2010: Gories Mere
- 2010: Imhoff Andreas Balthasar
- 2010: Kirinde Dhammaratena Thero
- 2010: Kwek Len San
- 2010: Rifaat Ahmed Abdel Karim
- 2010: Russell Walker Strong
- 2011: Evelyn Genta
- 2011: George Che-Ching Wang
- 2011: Ghanim Saad M Alsaad Al-Kuwari
- 2011: Hassan bin Salleh
- 2011: Ikbal Abouelkacem Abbassi
- 2011: Noureddine Ayed
- 2011: Tritot Ronnaritivichai
- 2012: Khadem Abdulla Al Qubaisi
- 2012: Mark James Stewart
- 2012: Takashi Hibi
- 2013: Peter Robert Vogt
- 2014: Saridchai Anakevieng
- 2017: Marcus Levon Karakashian
- 2017: Shigeharu Toda
