= Nancy Malloy =

Canadian Red Cross administrator and nurse

- Born: Nancy Malloy; 6 October 1945; Brockville, Ontario, Canada
- Died: 17 December 1996 (aged 51); Novye Atagi, Ichkeria (now Chechnya, Russia)
- Occupations: Medical administrator and nurse at the Canadian Red Cross

Nancy Malloy (6 October 1945 – 17 December 1996) was a medical administrator and nurse for the British Columbian branch of the Canadian Red Cross. She participated in various international missions that took place at remote hospitals, often in dangerous areas. On 17 December 1996 she was murdered together with five of her colleagues when on a mission in Chechnya, Russia. Posthumously, she was awarded both the Florence Nightingale Medal and the Meritorious Service Medal.

== Life ==
Born in Brockville, Ontario, on 6 October 1945, she studied at the KGH School of Nursing before completing her bachelor's degree in Nursing Science at Queen's University in 1969. After being a teacher in Montreal, she moved to Vancouver in 1979, where she worked as a nurse at Vancouver General Hospital. She joined the local Red Cross branch in 1987. Over the course of nine years, she was a director and medical administrator for six outpost hospitals in remote British Columbia. As well, she participated as a medical administrator and nurse during ICRC missions to Ethiopia (1990), Kuwait and Iran (1991), Belgrade (1993), Zaire (1995), and Chechnya (1996).

== Murder ==
In the mission following a peace treaty between Russia and Chechnya, Nancy Malloy, together with six international Red Cross workers were located in a hospital in Novye Atagi, close to Grozny, the capital of the Chechnya region. On 17 December 1996, when the mission had been running for two and a half months, armed men entered the sleeping quarters of the hospital and shot and killed Malloy, together with five of her coworkers.
In 2010, it was reported that a Russian special forces major had claimed to be part of the group which carried out the shooting, and that their intention was to target Chechen fighters. However, witnesses had claimed soon after the event that they had heard the attackers speaking Chechen, and that the Red Cross staff had been directly targeted.

== Honours ==
A memorial plaque on the fatal attack is present in a school and former hospital in Novye Atagi. Nancy Malloy was awarded the Meritorious Service Medal in 1997 by Governor General Romeo LeBlanc. As well, she was awarded the Florence Nightingale Medal by the ICRC, while receiving the Order of the Red Cross from the Canadian Red Cross in 2001. In addition, Queen's University's school of nursing administers the Nancy Malloy Memorial Award, handed out by her friends and classmates.
