= Ethiopian Red Cross Society =

Healthcare organization in Ethiopia

- የኢትዮጵያ ቀይ መስቀል ማኅበር
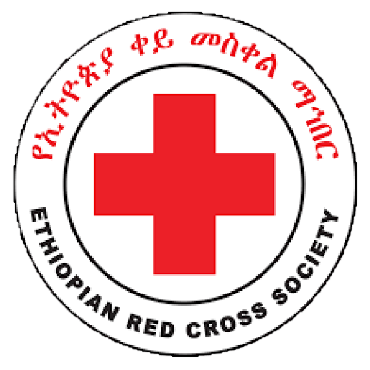
- Established: 8 July 1935; 91 years ago
- Type: NGO
- Headquarters: Ras Desta Damtew Avenue, Addis Ababa, Ethiopia
- Region served: Ethiopia
- Services: Humanitarian
- Patron: Taye Atske Selassie
- President: Abera Tola
- Staff: 10,001+ (2025)
- Website: redcrosseth.org

The Ethiopian Red Cross Society (ERCS) (Amharic: የኢትዮጵያ ቀይ መስቀል ማኅበር, romanized: Ya'Ityopyā qay masqal māhebar, (ኢ.ቀ.መ.ማ.)) is a humanitarian organization working in partnership with the Ethiopian government the International Federation of the Red Cross and Red Crescent Societie (IFRC), the International Committee of the Red Cross (ICRC), national societies, volunteers and its beneficiaries. It currently has 6.35 million fee-paying adult and youth members and more than 500,000 volunteers.

== History ==
The Ethiopian Red Cross Society (ERCS) is one of the 192 national Red Cross and Red Crescent societies around the world. It was established by government decree on 8 July 1935 in the aftermath of the second Italian aggression over Ethiopia. ERCS began by providing humanitarian services to wounded soldiers and civilian victims. That same year on 25 September 1935, ERCS was officially recognized as the 48th member of the International Federation of Red Cross and Red Crescent Societies.

The Ethiopian Red Cross Society (ERCS) is a government auxiliary, but it is also an independent humanitarian organization. It was established and legally recognized by a National Charter adopted on October 31, 1947. The Charter has been subjected to several parliamentary revisions, the most recent of which occurred in 1999. In January 2018, the current charter was approved by the Parliament.

== Role ==
According to its charter the ERCS has several key responsibilities including; providing assistance to vulnerable individuals and communities affected by natural and man-made disasters, rehabilitating displaced victims, supporting environmental initiatives, disseminating the Red Cross and Red Crescent (RCRC) movement and international humanitarian law, and promoting peace.

== Leadership ==
As of April 2018, Abera Tola was president of ERCS and elected for 2nd term as president as of July, 2022 The National Governing Board of ERCS has nine members namely Ato Abera Tola Geda, President; Dr. Fozia Ali Yimer, Vice President; Wz.Hikmet Abdela, Treasurer; Honorable Dr. Ambasador Tawfik Abdulahi, member; Dr. Dereje Duguma, member; Dr. Seifu Getahu, member; Engineer Getahun Hussien, member; Ato Eyasu Kumsa, member and Dr. Adisalem Mulat member representing the Youth. The President of the Federal Democratic Republic of Ethiopia, Her Excellency Sahilework Zewudie has been the Patron of the National Society since 2018.
