= National Council for the Blind Malaysia =

National Council for the Blind, Malaysia (NCBM) Majlis Kebangsaan Bagi Orang Buta, Malaysia
- Abbreviation: NCBM
- Formation: February 14, 1986
- Founder: Datin Roquaiya Hanim Tun Hussein
- Location: Unit 13-8, 13th Floor, Menara Sentral Vista, No. 150, Jalan Sultan Abdul Samad, Brickfields, 50470 Kuala Lumpur
- President: Datuk Rosalind Chew Bee Koh
- Vice President: Mr Irwan Hanis Bin Ismail
- Executive Director: Mr Wong Yoon Loong
- Affiliations: World Blind Union
- Website: ncbm.org.my

The National Council for the Blind, Malaysia (NCBM) set up the Braille Press on 1 April 1998 under the Chairmanship of the late Datin Roquaiya Hanim Tun Hussein. It was officially declared open by Yang Berhormat Dato’ Sri Mohd. Najib Tun Abdul Razak, the then Minister of Education, Malaysia, on 24 November 1998.

== Overview ==
NCBM was formed and registered on 14 February 1986 to bring together five organisations to work as partners in providing more efficient and quality services to help blind people to become useful citizens. Our mission as a national co-ordinating body is to assist Member Organisations in developing services so that blind people, no matter where they live in the country, may enjoy equal opportunity in receiving education, rehabilitation, and employment services. To reach this long-term objective NCBM will work with the Government and groups with similar aims.

In carrying out our role as a National body, NCBM provides a platform for representatives from around the country to meet regularly on its three committees to discuss all aspects of work - Education, Employment, and Public Awareness. Where possible and necessary, NCBM will give financial assistance for implementing projects and sponsoring personnel to attend training and skills as well as upgrading courses.

The mission statement of the organization is; TO ENSURE BLIND PEOPLE WILL RECEIVE APPROPRIATE TRAINING AND ENJOY QUALITY SERVICES REGARDLESS OF WHERE THEY LIVE IN THE COUNTRY.

Braille Press will strive to ensure that Braille is made available where necessary, even at subsidised rates, to empower blind people to participate meaningfully in community concerns and to promote their socio-economic advancement.

== Member Organizations of NCBM ==
The five major voluntary organizations serving the blind that make up this umbrella body are:

1. Malaysian Association for the Blind (MAB), based in Kuala Lumpur
2. Society of the Blind in Malaysia (SBM), based in Kuala Lumpur
3. St. Nicholas’ Home, based in Penang
4. Sabah Society for the Blind, based in Kota Kinabalu, Sabah
5. Sarawak Society for the Blind, based in Kuching, Sarawak

== Objectives ==
1. To have a fully equipped Braille printing press to meet the needs of Braille users in the country.
2. To provide a facility where organisations and individuals may receive prompt and reliable Braille transcription services.
3. To ensure that blind people have access to the same information as their sighted counterparts when attending official functions, religious services or private gatherings.
4. To help create opportunities for blind people to hold responsible and administrative positions by making available appropriate Braille reference materials.
5. To promote Braille literacy and to work towards making the Braille Press the standard-setter for Braille systems used in the country

== Functions ==
The functions of NCBM include the following:

1. Co-ordinate activities of member organizations, encourage and facilitate co-operation between them.
2. provide the forum for consultation and discussion of aims, policies, plans, activities, views, and problems of member organizations.
3. Review and promote progress in the fields of education, braille literacy and computerized braille production, rehabilitation, vocational training, employment, social welfare services, prevention of blindness, and other programs and schemes for the blind in Malaysia.
4. Solicit the support of the government and other agencies for services, programs and schemes to be carried out for the socio-economic advancement of the blind.
5. Present a common approach to relevant government bodies, the private sector, and the Malaysian public in general on issues that may affect the welfare of the blind and liaise with other organizations serving other categories of disable person.
6. Represent Malaysia in all international bodies concern with the work for the blind, and appoint the Malaysian delegates to any national or international conferences.

== Our Goal ==
To collaborate with the Ministry of Education, Malaysia, in ensuring that blind and visually impaired students enjoy their rights to Braille text books and reference materials, whereby, giving them equal opportunities to education.

== Funds ==
NCBM accepts contributions, donations, grants, endowments, legacies and subscriptions from persons or bodies (including the government) desiring to assist in the promotion of the objectives and to hold such funds as trustees for the achievements of the said objectives.

== Publication ==
NCBM publishes a quarterly magazine in English – NCBM OUTREACH – and it is distributed to friends and supporters free of charge. However, contributions to defray the cost for printing are welcomed.
