= Azman Noh =

Malaysian politician (born 1967)

Yang Berhormat Tuan Azman Noh PMP AMP PPN PJK MLA
- ازمن نوه

Member of the Perak State Legislative Assembly for Pengkalan Baharu
- Incumbent
- Assumed office 19 November 2022
- Preceded by: Abdul Manaf Hashim (BN–UMNO)
- Majority: 1,076 (2022)

Personal details
- Born: 28 October 1967 (age 58) Kuala Kurau, Perak, Malaysia
- Party: United Malays National Organisation (UMNO)
- Other political affiliations: Barisan Nasional (BN)
- Spouse: Hakimah Mokhtar
- Education: Open University Malaysia
- Occupation: Politician

Azman bin Noh (Note: Jawi: ازمن بن نوه; Also known as Cikgu Man) (born 28 October 1967), is a Malaysian politician. He served as Member of Perak State Legislative Assembly (MLA) for Pengkalan Baharu since November 2022. He is a member of United Malays National Organisation (UMNO), a component party of Barisan Nasional (BN).

== Election results ==
Perak State Legislative Assembly
Year	Constituency	Candidate	Votes	Pct	Opponent(s)	Votes	Pct	Ballots cast	Majority	Turnout
2022	N36 Pengkalan Baharu	Azman Noh (UMNO)	6,665	40.58%	Ahmad Faisal Mansor (BERSATU)	5,589	34.03%	16,713	1,076	74.04%
2022	N36 Pengkalan Baharu	Azman Noh (UMNO)	6,665	40.58%	Abdul Jais Ashfaq Ahmed (PKR)	4,045	24.63%	16,713	1,076	74.04%
2022	N36 Pengkalan Baharu	Azman Noh (UMNO)	6,665	40.58%	Abdul Halim Mat Isa (PEJUANG)	125	0.76%	16,713	1,076	74.04%

== Honours ==
- Malaysia
  - Medal of the Order of the Defender of the Realm (PPN) (2006)
- Perak
  - Commander of the Order of the Perak State Crown (PMP) (2023)
  - Member of the Order of the Perak State Crown (AMP) (2015)
  - Recipient of the Meritorious Service Medal (PJK) (1998)
