= Larut (federal constituency) =

Federal constituency in Perak, Malaysia

Larut (P056)
Perak constituency

Federal constituency
- Legislature: Dewan Rakyat
- MP: Hamzah Zainudin; PN
- Constituency created: 1974
- First contested: 1974
- Last contested: 2022

Demographics
- Population (2020): 66,020
- Electors (2022): 65,719
- Area (km²): 1,129
- Pop. density (per km²): 58.5

Larut is a federal constituency in Larut, Matang and Selama District, Perak, Malaysia, that has been represented in the Dewan Rakyat since 1974.

The federal constituency was created in the 1974 redistribution and is mandated to return a single member to the Dewan Rakyat under the first past the post voting system.

== Demographics ==
Ethnic breakdown of Larut's electorate as of 2022
1. Malay (90.3%)
2. Indian (5.50%)
3. Chinese (3.90%)
4. Other ethnicities (0.20%)

As of 2020, Larut has a population of 66,020 people.

Age breakdown of Larut's electorate as of 2022
1. 18-20 (5.95%)
2. 21-29 (21.6%)
3. 30-39 (22.9%)
4. 40-49 (17.4%)
5. 50-59 (13.6%)
6. 60-69 (10.6%)
7. 70-79 (5.63%)
8. 80-89 (1.98%)
9. above 90 (0.36%)
Gender breakdown of Larut's electorate as of 2022
1. Male (49.1%)
2. Female (50.9%)

== History ==
=== Polling districts ===
According to the federal gazette issued on 31 October 2022, the Larut constituency is divided into 46 polling districts.

State constituency	Polling Districts	Code	Location
Selama (N05）	Ulu Selama	056/05/01	SK Sungai Siputeh
Selama (N05）	Ulu Selama Barat	056/05/02	SK Bukit Bertam
Selama (N05）	Banggol Jas	056/05/03	SMK Sungai Bayor
Selama (N05）	Sungai Rambutan	056/05/04	SK Toh Rakna Sakti
Selama (N05）	Sungai Bedarah	056/05/05	SK Toh Rahna Sakti
Selama (N05）	Kampong Sungai Siputeh	056/05/06	SK Sungai Siputeh
Selama (N05）	Kampong Gorok	056/05/07	SK Sungai Bayor
Selama (N05）	Sungai Bayor	056/05/08	SK Sungai Bayor
Selama (N05）	Ulu Mengkuang	056/05/09	SK Ulu Mengkuang
Selama (N05）	Rantau Panjang	056/05/10	SK Rantau Panjang
Selama (N05）	Rantau Panjang Utara	056/05/11	SJK (C) Chi Sheng (2)
Selama (N05）	Pekan Selama	056/05/12	SK Selama
Selama (N05）	Selama Utara	056/06/13	SK Sri Selama
Selama (N05）	Sungai Terap	056/05/14	SJK (C) Sungai Terap
Selama (N05）	Bukit Kelian	056/05/15	SMK Dato' Hj Hussein
Kubu Gajah (N06）	Sungai Dendang	056/06/01	SK Sungai Dendang
Kubu Gajah (N06）	Kubu Gajah	056/06/02	SMK Kubu Gajah
Kubu Gajah (N06）	Tebing Tinggi	056/06/03	SK Tebing Tinggi
Kubu Gajah (N06）	Sungai Malau	056/06/04	SK Tebing Tinggi
Kubu Gajah (N06）	Ladang Holyrood	056/06/05	SK (RTBK) Pondok Tanjong
Kubu Gajah (N06）	Bagan Baharu	056/06/06	SK Bagan Baharu
Kubu Gajah (N06）	FELDA Ijok	056/06/07	SK Sultan Idris II
Kubu Gajah (N06）	Ulu Ijok Timor	056/06/08	SK Sungai Jernih
Kubu Gajah (N06）	Kampong Bendang Luas	056/06/09	SK Haji Wan Jaafar
Kubu Gajah (N06）	Rendang Panjang	056/06/10	SMK Rendang Panjang
Kubu Gajah (N06）	Pantai Besar	056/06/11	SK Pantai Besar
Kubu Gajah (N06）	Sungai Ara	056/06/12	SK Sungai Ara
Kubu Gajah (N06）	Kampong Gudang	056/06/13	SK Kampung Gudang
Kubu Gajah (N06）	Batu Dua Puluh	056/06/14	SK Kampung Yaman
Kubu Gajah (N06）	Jelai	056/06/15	SK Jelai
Kubu Gajah (N06）	Relang	056/06/16	SK Kampung Relang
Kubu Gajah (N06）	Kampong Ayer Hitam	056/06/17	SK Jelai
Batu Kurau（N07）	Ulu Sepetang	056/07/01	SK Ulu Sepetang
Batu Kurau（N07）	Sungai Pulau	056/07/02	SK Toh Sajak
Batu Kurau（N07）	Batu Kurau	056/07/03	SMK Dato Kamaruddin
Batu Kurau（N07）	Changkat Perah	056/07/04	SMK Dato Kamaruddin
Batu Kurau（N07）	Kampong Repoh	056/07/05	SK Kampung Repoh
Batu Kurau（N07）	Sungai Akar	056/07/06	SK Batu Kurau
Batu Kurau（N07）	Kampong Titi Kasai	056/07/07	SMK Kampong Perak
Batu Kurau（N07）	Changkat Lobak	056/07/08	Madrasah Diniah SA Rakyat Nurul Khairiah
Batu Kurau（N07）	Bukit Bertan	056/07/09	SMK Kampong Perak
Batu Kurau（N07）	Kampong Perak Tengah	056/07/10	SK Kampong Perak
Batu Kurau（N07）	Kampong Sempeneh	056/07/11	SK Kampong Perak
Batu Kurau（N07）	Kampong Anak Kurau	056/07/12	SK Sri Kurau
Batu Kurau（N07）	Changkat Larah	056/07/13	SK Ulu Sepetang
Batu Kurau（N07）	Taman Rakyat	056/07/14	SRA Rakyat Nurul Khairiah; Tabika KEMAS, Taman Rakyat dan Dewan Orang Ramai, Taman Rakyat

=== Representation history ===
Members of Parliament for Larut
Parliament	No	Years	Member	Party	Vote Share
Constituency created from Larut Utara
4th	P045	1974–1978	Kamaruddin Mohamed Isa (قمرالدين محمد عيسى)	BN (UMNO)	12,575; 83.99%
5th	P045	1978–1982	Kamaruddin Mohamed Isa (قمرالدين محمد عيسى)	BN (UMNO)	12,009; 71.00%
6th	P045	1982–1986	Kamaruddin Mohamed Isa (قمرالدين محمد عيسى)	BN (UMNO)	13,580; 73.53%
7th	P050	1986–1990	Mohd. Zihin Mohd. Hassan (محمد ذهن محمد حسّان)	BN (UMNO)	15,897; 73.35%
8th	P050	1990–1995	Mohd. Zihin Mohd. Hassan (محمد ذهن محمد حسّان)	BN (UMNO)	17,162; 73.55%
9th	P053	1995–1999	Mohd. Zihin Mohd. Hassan (محمد ذهن محمد حسّان)	BN (UMNO)	Uncontested
10th	P053	1999–2004	Raja Ahmad Zainuddin Raja Omar (راج أحمد زين الدين راج عمر)	BN (UMNO)	14,334; 58.13%
11th	P056	2004–2008	Raja Ahmad Zainuddin Raja Omar (راج أحمد زين الدين راج عمر)	BN (UMNO)	19,064; 62.46%
12th	P056	2008–2013	Hamzah Zainudin (حمزة زين الدين)	BN (UMNO)	15,878; 53.20%
13th	P056	2013–2018	Hamzah Zainudin (حمزة زين الدين)	BN (UMNO)	22,184; 56.38%
14th	P056	2018	Hamzah Zainudin (حمزة زين الدين)	BN (UMNO)	18,184; 45.90%
14th	P056	2018–2019	Hamzah Zainudin (حمزة زين الدين)	Independent	18,184; 45.90%
14th	P056	2019–2020	Hamzah Zainudin (حمزة زين الدين)	PH (BERSATU)	18,184; 45.90%
14th	P056	2020–2022	Hamzah Zainudin (حمزة زين الدين)	PN (BERSATU)	18,184; 45.90%
15th	P056	2022–2026	Hamzah Zainudin (حمزة زين الدين)	PN (BERSATU)	28,350; 54.65%
15th	P056	2026	Hamzah Zainudin (حمزة زين الدين)	Independent	28,350; 54.65%
15th	P056	2026–present	Hamzah Zainudin (حمزة زين الدين)	PN (WAWASAN)	28,350; 54.65%

=== State constituency ===
Parliamentary constituency	State constituency						
Parliamentary constituency	1955–1959*	1959–1974	1974–1986	1986–1995	1995–2004	2004–2018	2018–present
Larut			Batu Kurau				
Larut						Kubu Gajah	
Larut			Selama				

=== Historical boundaries ===
State Constituency	Area				
State Constituency	1974	1984	1994	2003	2018
Batu Kurau	Bagan Baharu; Batu Kurau; Jelai; Kelian Besar; Sungai Jernih			Batu Kurau; Changkat Larah; Changkat Lobak; Jelai; Kampung Pantai Besar	Batu Kurau; Changkat Larah; Changkat Lobak; Kampung Perak; Kampung Repoh
Kubu Gajah				Bagan Baharu; FELDA Ijok; Kelian Besar; Kubu Gajah; Sungai Jernih	Bagan Baharu; FELDA Ijok; Jelai; Kampung Pantai Besar; Kubu Gajah
Selama	Kampung Sungai Dendang; Kubu Gajah; Larut; Rantau Panjang; Selama			Kampung Sungai Dendang; Larut; Rantau Panjang; Selama; Sungai Bayor	

=== Current state assembly members ===
No.	State Constituency	Member	Coalition (Party)
N05	Selama	Mohd Akmal Kamaruddin	PN (PAS)
N06	Kubu Gajah	Khalil Yahaya	PN (PAS)
N07	Batu Kurau	Mohd Najmuddin Elias Al-Hafiz	PN (BERSATU)

=== Local governments & postcodes ===
No.	State Constituency	Local Government	Postcode
N05	Selama	Selama District Council	34010, 34020, 34030 Taiping; 34100, 34120, 34130 Selama; 34140 Rantau Panjang; 34500, 34510, 34520 Batu Kurau; 34600 Kamunting
N06	Kubu Gajah	Taiping Municipal Council (Jelai area); Selama District Council	34010, 34020, 34030 Taiping; 34100, 34120, 34130 Selama; 34140 Rantau Panjang; 34500, 34510, 34520 Batu Kurau; 34600 Kamunting
N07	Batu Kurau	Taiping Municipal Council	34010, 34020, 34030 Taiping; 34100, 34120, 34130 Selama; 34140 Rantau Panjang; 34500, 34510, 34520 Batu Kurau; 34600 Kamunting

== Election results ==
Malaysian general election, 2022
Party	Candidate	Votes	%	∆%
PN	Hamzah Zainudin	28,350	54.65	▲54.65
BN	Mohd Shafiq Fhadly Mahmud	16,752	32.29	▼13.61
PH	Zolkarnain Abidin	6,207	11.97	▲11.97
PEJUANG	Awzey Fazlan Sahidi	566	1.09	▲1.09
Total valid votes		51,875	100.00	
Total rejected ballots		735		
Unreturned ballots		154		
Turnout		52,764	78.93	▼2.91
Registered electors		65,719		
Majority		11,598	22.36	▲11.04
PN gain from BN		Swing		?
Source(s) https://lom.agc.gov.my/ilims/upload/portal/akta/outputp/1753277/PUB610%20PARLIMEN%20PERAK.pdf

Malaysian general election, 2018
Party	Candidate	Votes	%	∆%
BN	Hamzah Zainudin	18,184	45.90	▼10.48
PAS	Abu Husin Mohmmad	13,698	34.57	▼8.35
PKR	Khairil Anuar Akhiruddin	7,738	19.53	▲19.53
Total valid votes		39,620	100.00	
Total rejected ballots		722		
Unreturned ballots		128		
Turnout		40,470	81.84	▼4.25
Registered electors		49,453		
Majority		4,486	11.32	▼2.14
BN hold		Swing		
Source(s) "His Majesty's Government Gazette - Notice of Contested Election, Parliament for the State of Perak [P.U. (B) 237/2018]" (PDF). Attorney General's Chambers of Malaysia. 3 May 2018. "Federal Government Gazette - Results of Contested Election and Statements of the Poll after the Official Addition of Votes, Parliamentary Constituencies for the State of Perak [P.U. (B) 311/2018]" (PDF). Attorney General's Chambers of Malaysia. 28 May 2018.

Malaysian general election, 2013
Party	Candidate	Votes	%	∆%
BN	Hamzah Zainudin	22,184	56.38	▲3.18
PAS	Mohd Fauzi Sa'ari	16,888	42.92	▼3.88
Independent	Raveendran M. Vallikana	278	0.70	▲0.70
Total valid votes		39,350	100.00	
Total rejected ballots		579		
Unreturned ballots		171		
Turnout		40,100	86.09	▲9.03
Registered electors		46,577		
Majority		5,296	13.46	▲7.06
BN hold		Swing		
Source(s) "Federal Government Gazette - Notice of Contested Election, Parliament for the State of Perak [P.U. (B) 174/2013]" (PDF). Attorney General's Chambers of Malaysia. 26 April 2013. Archived from the original (PDF) on 2019-12-29. "Federal Government Gazette - Results of Contested Election and Statements of the Poll after the Official Addition of Votes, Parliamentary Constituencies for the State of Perak [P.U. (B) 215/2013]" (PDF). Attorney General's Chambers of Malaysia. 22 May 2013.

Malaysian general election, 2008
Party	Candidate	Votes	%	∆%
BN	Hamzah Zainudin	15,878	53.20	▼9.26
PAS	Mohd. Dhari Othman	13,967	46.80	▲9.26
Total valid votes		29,845	100.00	
Total rejected ballots		687		
Unreturned ballots		57		
Turnout		30,589	77.06	▼0.94
Registered electors		39,697		
Majority		1,911	6.40	▼18.52
BN hold		Swing		

Malaysian general election, 2004
Party	Candidate	Votes	%	∆%
BN	Raja Ahmad Zainuddin Raja Omar	19,064	62.46	▲4.33
PAS	Kamarudin Awang Basir	11,456	37.54	▲37.54
Total valid votes		30,520	100.00	
Total rejected ballots		795		
Unreturned ballots		0		
Turnout		31,315	78.00	▲6.24
Registered electors		40,147		
Majority		7,608	24.92	▲8.66
BN hold		Swing		

Malaysian general election, 1999
Party	Candidate	Votes	%	∆%
BN	Raja Ahmad Zainuddin Raja Omar	14,334	58.13	▲58.13
PKR	Muhammad Nur Manuty	10,325	41.87	▲41.87
Total valid votes		24,659	100.00	
Total rejected ballots		834		
Unreturned ballots		7		
Turnout		25,500	71.76	
Registered electors		35,535		
Majority		4,009	16.26	
BN hold		Swing		

Malaysian general election, 1995
Party	Candidate	Votes	%	∆%
On the nomination day, Mohd. Zihin Mohd. Hassan won uncontested.
BN	Mohd. Zihin Mohd. Hassan			
Total valid votes			100.00	
Total rejected ballots				
Unreturned ballots				
Turnout				
Registered electors		35,919		
Majority				
BN hold		Swing		
Source(s) https://github.com/TindakMalaysia/HISTORICAL-ELECTION-RESULTS/blob/main/1995-ELECTION-RESULTS/MALAYSIA_1995_PARLIAMENT_RESULTS.csv

Malaysian general election, 1990
Party	Candidate	Votes	%	∆%
BN	Mohd. Zihin Mohd. Hassan	17,162	73.55	▲0.20
S46	Ahmad Nawi	6,172	26.45	▲26.45
Total valid votes		23,334	100.00	
Total rejected ballots		805		
Unreturned ballots		0		
Turnout		24,139	72.12	▲3.61
Registered electors		33,469		
Majority		10,990	47.10	▼0.40
BN hold		Swing		

Malaysian general election, 1986
Party	Candidate	Votes	%	∆%
BN	Mohd. Zihin Mohd. Hassan	15,897	73.35	▲0.18
PAS	Zawawi Kamaruddin	5,775	26.65	▼0.18
Total valid votes		21,672	100.00	
Total rejected ballots		656		
Unreturned ballots				
Turnout		22,328	68.51	▼6.83
Registered electors		32,593		
Majority		10,122	46.70	▼0.36
BN hold		Swing		

Malaysian general election, 1982
Party	Candidate	Votes	%	∆%
BN	Kamaruddin Mohamed Isa	13,580	73.53	▲2.54
PAS	Ahmad Yusof	4,888	26.47	▼2.53
Total valid votes		18,468	100.00	
Total rejected ballots		558		
Unreturned ballots		0		
Turnout		19,026	75.34	▼3.40
Registered electors		25,253		
Majority		8,692	47.06	▲5.06
BN hold		Swing		

Malaysian general election, 1978
Party	Candidate	Votes	%	∆%
BN	Kamaruddin Mohamed Isa	12,009	71.00	▲12.99
PAS	Abdul Wahab Mohd Noor	4,904	29.00	▲29.00
Total valid votes		16,913	100.00	
Total rejected ballots		408		
Unreturned ballots		0		
Turnout		17,321	78.74	▲1.68
Registered electors		21,997		
Majority		7,105	42.00	▼25.98
BN hold		Swing		

Malaysian general election, 1974
Party	Candidate	Votes	%
BN	Kamaruddin Mohamed Isa	12,575	83.99
Homeland Consciousness Union	Mohamed Nawawi Mohamed Hassan	2,397	16.01
Total valid votes		14,972	100.00
Total rejected ballots		767	
Unreturned ballots		0	
Turnout		15,739	77.06
Registered electors		20,424	
Majority		10,178	67.98
This was a new constituency created.
