= Khoo Chong Kong =

Malaysian police officer

Yang Berbahagia Tan Sri Dato' Seri Panglima Khoo Chong Kong PSM SPTS PBS JMN KMN PPM CPM
- Born: 1925; Xunwu County, Jiangxi, China
- Died: 14 November 1975 (aged 49–50); Ipoh, Perak, Malaysia
- Burial place: Seremban, Negeri Sembilan, Malaysia
- Spouse: Puan Sri Cheah Choy Yim
- Children: 5
- Military career
- Allegiance: Malaysia
- Branch: Royal Malaysia Police
- Service years: 1952–1975
- Rank: Deputy Commissioner of Police
- Service number: G/4218
- Awards: Order of Loyalty to the Crown of Malaysia

Khoo Chong Kong

Chinese name
- Traditional Chinese: 古傳光
- Simplified Chinese: 古传光
- Hanyu Pinyin: Gǔ Chuánguāng
- Pha̍k-fa-sṳ: Kú Chhòn-kông
- Jyutping: Gu2 Cyun4 Gwong1
- Hokkien POJ: Kó͘ Thoân-kong
- Tâi-lô: Kóo Thuân-kong

Khoo Chong Kong (Chinese: 古传光; pinyin: Gǔ Chuánguāng; Jyutping: Gu2 Cyun4 Gwong1; Pe̍h-ōe-jī: Kó͘ Thoân-kong; Pha̍k-fa-sṳ: Kú Chhòn-kông; 1925 – 14 November 1975) was the former Perak state Police Chief during the Communist insurgency period in Malaysia.

== Early life ==
Khoo Chong Kong was born on 1925 in Xunwu county, Jiangxi province, China and was the youngest-born child of a Hakka family with ancestral roots in nearby Guangdong province of 7 siblings (6 males and a female). His father was a doctor.

He was about 2 or 3 years old when his family were ransacked by Communists during the Chinese Civil War and as a result, he decided to leave a few of his family members behind and came to Malaya with one of his brothers, uncles and relatives who were missionaries and were settled firstly in their adoptive hometown of Seremban, Negeri Sembilan, where he was domiciled even during his police career for citizenship purposes and later to be the site of his final resting place.

After arriving in Malaya, they later migrated and then settled in Ipoh and lived at the Cheng Elim Gospel Church on Taiping Road and studied at Nan Ying Hua School. Although he and his family lived in poverty, he studied very hard in order to have a bright future and also works hard to earn extra money for a living prior to his police career.

Later, his aunt who completed higher education, arrived in Malaya and started working as a head nurse at the Negeri Sembilan Chinese Midwifery Home.

Therefore, when he was a student, Khoo would frequently ride his bicycle from Ipoh to Negeri Sembilan back and forth to visit his aunt.

When the Japanese invaded Malaya, his uncle instructed him and his brother to go south to Negeri Sembilan to seek help from his aunt and then he joined the Malayan People's Anti-Japanese Army formed by the Communist Party of Malaya. After the war, his friends persuaded him to join the Communist Party of Malaya, but because of ideological differences between him and a few of his friends, he refused to become a member.

== Assassination ==
On 13 November 1975, DCP Khoo was shot by two gunmen of the Communist Party of Malaya (CPM) on a motorcycle, at a line of traffic lights junction between Fair Park and Jalan Anderson in Ipoh, Perak. His driver, PC 5135 Yeung Peng Chong (promoted to Sergeant posthumously) was also killed when he returned fire at his assassins. After 28 hours, Khoo's condition worsened due to his gunshot wounds and later he died at the Ipoh General Hospital (or known as the Hospital Raja Permaisuri Bainun today) at the age of 50. After his assassination, his colleague, DCP Dato' (later Tan Sri) Yuen Yuet Leng replaced him as Perak Chief Police Officer.

His funeral in Ipoh, was attended by about 20,000 people including then-Prime Minister of Malaysia, Tun Abdul Razak and then-Inspector General of Police, Tun Hanif Omar.

His body was later flown back to Royal Malaysian Air Force (RMAF) Sempang Air Base in Sungai Besi, Kuala Lumpur and was laid to rest in his adoptive hometown of Seremban, Negeri Sembilan.

== Legacy ==
Two roads were named after him such as Jalan Khoo Chong Kong in Ipoh, Perak and Jalan Tan Sri Khoo Chong Kong at the Royal Malaysian Police quarters in Taman Desa Baiduri, Cheras, Selangor.

== Honours ==
- Malaysia
  - Recipient of the Malaysian Commemorative Medal (Silver) (PPM) (1965)
  - Officer of the Order of the Defender of the Realm (KMN) (1966)
  - Companion of the Order of the Defender of the Realm (JMN) (1970)
  - Commander of the Order of Loyalty to the Crown of Malaysia (PSM) – Tan Sri (1975 – Posthumously)
- Sarawak
  - Officer of the Most Exalted Order of the Star of Sarawak (PBS) (1968)
- Perak
  - Knight Grand Commander of the Order of Taming Sari (SPTS) – Dato' Seri Panglima (2015 – Posthumously)

=== Commonwealth honours ===
- United Kingdom
  - Recipient of the Colonial Police Medal (CPM) (1963)
