= Order of Taming Sari =

Knighthood order of the Sultanate of Perak

Order of Taming Sari Darjah Kebesaran Taming Sari Negeri Perak

Awarded by Sultan of Perak
- Type: Order
- Founded: 1977
- Criteria: Awarded to military and police personnel
- Status: Currently constituted
- Founder: Sultan Idris Shah II
- Sovereign: Sultan Nazrin Muizzuddin Shah
- Grades: Grand Commander (SPTS); Commander (DPTS); Companion (PTS); Warrior (HTS); Officer (KTS); Member (ATS)
- Post-nominals: S.P.T.S.; D.P.T.S.; P.T.S.; H.T.S.; K.T.S.; A.T.S.

Statistics
- First induction: 1978
- Last induction: 2022
- Total inductees: 58 Knight Grand Commanders; 204 Knight Commanders; 135 Commanders; 128 Hulubalangs; 245 Officers; 144 Members

Precedence
- Next (higher): Order of Cura Si Manja Kini
- Next (lower): Order of the Perak State Crown
- Knight Grand Commander Knight Commander; Current ribbon bar of the order

The Most Valliant Order of Taming Sari (Malay: Darjah Kebesaran Taming Sari Negeri Perak Yang Amat Perkasa) is knighthood order of the Sultanate of Perak.

== Background ==
Founded by Sultan Idris Shah II in 1977.

== Timeline of ribbon ==
Class	1977–2000	2001–2013	Since 2014
S.P.T.S.			
D.P.T.S.			
P.T.S.		---	
H.T.S.		---	
K.T.S.		---	
A.T.S.		---	

== Classes ==
There are six classes of the order:

- Grand Commander (post-nominal letters : SPTS)
- Commander (post-nominal letters : DPTS)
- Companion (post-nominal letters : PTS)
- Warrior (post-nominal letters : HTS)
- Officer (post-nominal letters : KTS)
- Member (post-nominal letters : ATS)

Since 1989, the grade of P.T.S., H.T.S., K.T.S. and A.T.S. were abrogated.

== Recipients ==
=== Grand Commander (SPTS) ===
The grand commanders receives the title Dato' Seri Panglima and his wife Datin Seri Panglima

- 1978: Mohd Sany Abdul Ghaffar
- 1978: Mohammed Hanif Omar
- 1986: Mohd Ghazali Che Mat
- 1986: Mohamed Hashim Mohd Ali
- 1987: Abdul Wahab Nawi
- 1987: Mohamed Ngah Said
- 1989: Raja Nazrin Shah
- 1989: Mohamed Daud Abu Bakar
- 1990: Yaacob Mohd Zain
- 1990: Mohd Yunus Mohd Tasi
- 1991: Mohd Shariff Ishak
- 1992: Abdul Rahman Abdul Hamid
- 1994: Abdul Ghani Aziz
- 1995: Mohammad Ali Alwi
- 1996: Ismail Omar
- 1996: Che Md Noor Mat Arshad
- 1996: Ahmad Ramli Mohd Nor
- 1997: Ahmad Saruji Che Rose
- 1998: Norian Mai
- 1998: Mohd Zahidi Zainuddin
- 1999: Md Hashim Hussein
- 1999: Abu Bakar Abdul Jamal
- 2000: Zaini Mohd Said
- 2002: Suleiman Mahmud
- 2002: Mohd Bakri Omar
- 2003: Abdullah Ahmad
- 2003: Salleh Mat Som
- 2004: Mohd Azumi Mohamed
- 2004: Mohd Anwar Mohd Nor
- 2004: Mohd Sedek Mohd Ali
- 2014: Khalid Abu Bakar
- 2015: Khoo Chong Kong
- 2015: Raja Mohamed Affandi
- 2017: Zulkiple Kassim
- 2017: Noor Rashid Ibrahim
- 2019: Abdul Hamid Bador
- 2020: Affendi Buang
- 2020: Acryl Sani Abdullah Sani
- 2022: Razarudin Husain
- 2023: Mohammad Ab Rahman
- 2023: Ayob Khan Mydin Pitchay

=== Commander (DPTS) ===
The commanders receives the title Dato' Pahlawan and his wife Datin Pahlawan

- 1978: Mohd Ghazali Che Mat
- 1978: Mohd Zain Mohd Salleh
- 1978: Mohamed Ngah Said
- 1978: N. Selvarajah
- 1978: Borhan Kuntom
- 1978: Ahmad Abdul Hamid
- 1979: Jaafar Onn
- 1979: Chen Kwee Fong
- 1979: Abdul Majid Mohd Din
- 1979: Wan Yaacob Wan Ibrahim
- 1980: Mior Jaafar Mior Safi
- 1981: Chong Thean Bok
- 1982: Osman Mohd Zain
- 1982: Ibrahim Mohamed
- 1983: Nasir Mohd Diah
- 1985: Yaakob Mohd Zain
- 1985: Mohd Yusof Din
- 1985: Shahruddin Mohd Ali
- 1985: Hasnan Abdul Aziz
- 1985: Mohd Yunus Mohd Tasi
- 1985: Mohamed Dahalan Sulaiman
- 1985: Raja Ibrahim Raja Shahriman
- 1986: Zulkifli Ali
- 1986: Abdul Rahman Abdul Hamid
- 1986: MOHD. ALI BIN DOLLAH
- 1986: IBRAHIM BIN HAJI ABDULLAH
- 1986: Mohd Tahir Sijan
- 1987: Mohd Kassim Ismail
- 1987: Amran Ibrahim
- 1987: Noordin Alaudin
- 1988: Abdul Rashid Raja Badiozaman
- 1988: Ang Phaik Chin
- 1988: Mohd Hamidi Mohd Yusof
- 1992: Zakiah Laidin
- 1998: Mariman Mohd Taib
- 1998: Mohd Yusof Abd Rahaman
- 1998: Mohd Zambri Ismail
- 2009: Zulkifli Mansor
- 2009: ZULKAFLAY BIN RAHMAN
- 2009: Syed Zahiruddin Putra Syed Osman
- 2009: ABD. RAHMAN BIN ABD. KARIM
- 2009: ABDUL GHANI BIN OTHMAN
- 2009: MOHAMMAD NOH BIN MOHD SAID
- 2009: KHAIRUL BAKRI BIN MUSTAFA
- 2009: Hadi Ho Abdullah
- 2009: Sulaiman Mohamad
- 2012: Hamza Taib
- 2012: Md Sani Ahmad
- 2012: Mohamad Adib Abdul Samad
- 2012: Mohd Shukri Dahlan
- 2012: Redzuan Baharuddin
- 2012: Sulaiman Mohamad
- 2012: Zulkifli Hassan
- 2015: Razarudin Husain
- 2015: Mior Faridalathrash Wahid
- 2015: Ahnar Anuar
- 2015: Ruzelme Ahmad Fahimy
- 2015: Nor Azam Jais
- 2021: Anuar Othman
- 2021: Rusli Ahmad
- 2021: Felix Gonsalvez Alexander
- 2021: Musa Kasmin
- 2022: Abdul Halim Shaari
- 2022: Safwan Ismail
- 2022: Abdul Hamid Mohd Isa
- 2022: Mohd Ghazalli Mohd Taha
- 2022: Shazeli Kahar

== See also ==
- Orders, decorations, and medals of the Malaysian states and federal territories#Perak
- Orders, decorations, and medals of Perak
- Order of precedence in Perak
- List of post-nominal letters (Perak)
