= Raja Ahmad Zainuddin Raja Omar =

Malaysian politician

Yang Mulia Dato' Sri Raja Ahmad Zainuddin Raja Omar PJN SSAP DMSM SIMP DSAP DPMP PMP AMP PPT JP
- راج احمد زاينوددين راج عمر

Ahli Dewan Rakyat Malaysia

Member of the Malaysian Parliament for Larut
- In office 29 November 1999 – 8 March 2008
- Preceded by: Mohd Zihin Mohd Hassan (BN–UMNO)
- Succeeded by: Hamzah Zainudin (BN–UMNO)
- Majority: 4,009 (1999); 7,608 (2004)

Member of the Perak State Assembly for Kubu Gajah
- In office 8 March 2008 – 5 May 2013
- Preceded by: Mohd Jafri Mohd Yunus (BN–UMNO)
- Succeeded by: Ahmad Hasbullah Alias (BN–UMNO)
- Majority: 66 (2008)

Member of the Perak State Assembly for Batu Kurau
- In office 1990 – 29 November 1999
- Preceded by: Abdul Manan Mohd Ali (BN–UMNO)
- Succeeded by: Mohd Jafri Mohd Yunus (BN–UMNO)
- Majority: 4,885 (1990); 4,808 (1995)

Personal details
- Born: Raja Ahmad Zainuddin Raja Omar; 1956 0
- Died: 9 June 2017 (aged 61) 0
- Citizenship: Malaysian
- Party: UMNO
- Other political affiliations: Barisan Nasional
- Education: -
- Occupation: Politician

Raja Ahmad Zainuddin bin Raja Omar was a Malaysian politician from UMNO.

He was the Member of Parliament for Larut from 1999 to 2008 and Member of Perak State Legislative Assembly for Kubu Gajah from 2008 to 2013.

== Early career ==
He was a blogger for Berita Harian, the Chief editor of Berita Harian Perak from 1988 to 1999 and Advisor for Mingguan Watan. He was also the Director of Ken Holdings Berhad, Muhibbah Engineering (M) Bhd and others. He was also the manager of Perak FC and Vice President of Football Association of Malaysia. He was suspended from 1991 to 1994, 2001 to 2005 and in 2006 due to criticism towards FAM.

== Politics ==
He was a member of the Perak Public Accounting Committee, Barisan Nasional Supporters Club, Chairman of Commercial Vehicle Licensing Board and Director of Tabung Haji Management Board.

=== UMNO Larut Crisis ===
He was the incumbent Chief of UMNO Larut branch and rejected Hamzah Zainuddin as a candidate for the Larut branch chief election as Hamzah joined the branch after 31 December 2007, which is a breach of UMNO's constitution. At the end, the Secretary-general of UMNO, Tengku Adnan Tengku Mansor had allowed Hamzah to participate in the election.

== Election results ==
Perak State Legislative Assembly
Year	Constituency	Candidate	Votes	Pct.	Opponent(s)	Votes	Pct.	Ballots cast	Majority	Turnout
1990	N04 Batu Kurau	Raja Ahmad Zainuddin Raja Omar (UMNO)	8,307	70.82%	Kamarudin Awang Basir (PAS)	3,422	29.18%	12,192	4,885	72.74%
1995	N05 Batu Kurau	Raja Ahmad Zainuddin Raja Omar (UMNO)	8,245	68.49%	Kamarudin Awang Basir (PAS)	3,437	28.55%	12,328	4,808	67.97%
1995	N05 Batu Kurau	Raja Ahmad Zainuddin Raja Omar (UMNO)	8,245	68.49%	Mohamed Shohor Mohd Nasir (IND)	357	2.97%	12,328	4,808	67.97%
2008	N06 Kubu Gajah	Raja Ahmad Zainuddin Raja Omar (UMNO)	4,114	49.28%	Mohd Nazri Din (PAS)	4,048	48.48%	8,349	66	76.00%

Parliament of Malaysia
Year	Constituency	Candidate	Votes	Pct.	Opponent(s)	Votes	Pct.	Ballots cast	Majority	Turnout
1999	P053 Larut	Raja Ahmad Zainuddin Raja Omar (UMNO)	14,334	56.21%	Mohd Nor Monutty (keADILan)	10,325	40.49%	25,500	4,009	71.76%
2004	P056 Larut	Raja Ahmad Zainuddin Raja Omar (UMNO)	19,064	60.88%	Kamarudin Awang Basir (PAS)	11,456	36.58%	31,315	7,608	78.00%

== Honours ==
- Malaysia
  - Commander of the Order of Meritorious Service (PJN) – Datuk (2007)
- Malacca
  - Companion Class I of the Exalted Order of Malacca (DMSM) – Datuk (2003)
- Pahang
  - Knight Grand Companion of the Order of Sultan Ahmad Shah of Pahang (SSAP) – Dato' Sri (2007)
  - Knight Grand Companion of the Order of the Crown of Pahang (SIMP) – formerly Dato', now Dato' Indera (2006)
  - Knight Companion of the Order of Sultan Ahmad Shah of Pahang (DSAP) – Dato' (2001)
- Perak
  - Knight Commander of the Order of the Perak State Crown (DPMP) – Dato' (1997)
  - Commander of the Order of the Perak State Crown (PMP) (1992)
  - Member of the Order of the Perak State Crown (AMP) (1988)
  - Recipient of the Distinguished Conduct Medal (PPT) (1983)
  - Justice of the Peace (JP) (1994)

== Health ==
He had died on 9 June 2017 in Hospital KPJ Ipoh.
