= Yuen Yuet Leng =

Malaysian police officer

Yang Berbahagia Tan Sri Dato' Seri Yuen Yuet Leng PSM SPMP JMN DPCM PNBS PPC PPM CPM
- Born: 15 September 1927; Taiping, Perak, Federated Malay States
- Died: 1 October 2015 (aged 88); Seri Kembangan, Selangor, Malaysia
- Military career
- Allegiance: Malaysia
- Branch: Royal Malaysia Police
- Service years: 1950–1983
- Rank: Deputy Commissioner of Police

Yuen Yuet Leng (15 September 1927 – 1 October 2015) was a senior Malaysian police officer of Chinese descent who served as Perak (1975–1977), Kuala Lumpur (1977–1979), Pahang (1979–January 1981) and Kelantan Police Chief (January–March 1981) as well as Sarawak Police Commissioner (April 1981–December 1983).

== Early life ==
Yuen Yuet Leng was born in Taiping, Perak on 15 September 1927. At the age of 7, he studied at King Edward VII School. But his education was interrupted by the Japanese occupation of Malaya. In 1942, he joined the Vocational Youth Training Board and the School of Mining Engineering in Ipoh. Later on, he and his friends were sent to the Teachers' Training Centre at the Kajang High School in 1945.

After the Japanese surrendered, Yuen went to China in early 1946 to further his tertiary education at the Lingnan University in Canton, China. Various problems he experienced including poverty in Canton caused Yuen to return to Malaya in early 1947. He returned to resume his secondary schooling at King Edward, Taiping.

He got a technical college scholarship in 1949, but instead he turned it down, as he had to work as a labourer with the Malayan Railways in order to support his family.

Prior to joining the police force, he began his professional working life by becoming a teacher at the King George V Secondary School in Seremban, Negeri Sembilan and was temporarily transferred on a job secondment to the Gemas English Primary School in Gemas.

== Police career ==
Yuen joined the Federation of Malaya Police on 1 December 1950 as Probationary Inspector. In 1952, he was posted to Gerik Police District Special Branch. Later, he was transferred to Sungai Siput and after that, he was awarded the Colonial Police Medal in 1957.

When the Malayan Emergency ended in 1960, Yuen was transferred to the Bukit Aman Headquarters for his first stint and continued to work with different departments such as the Special Branch, Intelligence and Psychology.

Then eight years later in 1968, as a part of his policing career, he furthered his law enforcement studies in Belfast, Northern Ireland, United Kingdom to learn the tactics that were practiced by the Irish Republican Army so that he can make use of it to sharpen up his weaponry skills in order to fight any encountering communist rebels.

After returning home from the UK two years later in 1970, ACP (later promoted to SAC) Yuen was assigned to Sarawak in East Malaysia for the first time (he only returned 11 years later in 1981 as Sarawak Police Commissioner until 1983, when he retired) whereby strong ideological influence from the North Kalimantan Communist Party (NKCP) increases drastically in the state.

In early 1972, three North Kalimantan Communist Party military commanders were successfully eliminated on a battlefield which took place at the Malaysia-Indonesia border (Sarawak-Kalimantan boundary). He returned to Kuala Lumpur at the same time but in late 1972, Yuen was reassigned to Sibu, Sarawak as the Head of the Special Branch of the Sibu Police District Headquarters, Sarawak Police Contingent and the Head of Combined Intelligence with the task of eliminating the communist guerrilla threat. This was achieved with the formation of the Rajang Security Command (RASCOM). With that, as many as 500 former terrorists were released back into civilian society.

He then returned to Bukit Aman in January 1975 as Deputy Director of Bukit Aman Special Branch. After that, he embarked on a tactical strategic plan and war against terrorists with a specialization in combating underground communist organizations. That same year in the month of November, he was promoted and simultaneously appointed as Perak Police Chief replacing his fellow colleague, the late DCP Dato' Khoo Chong Kong (later awarded the title of Tan Sri posthumously) who was assassinated by communist gunmen whilst serving in office.

Later in January 1977, he was then transferred to Kuala Lumpur and served as its police chief for two years until January 1979, in which he was then transferred once again to Pahang in the same position and served until January 1981, in which he would be again transferred to Kelantan and served for two months from January to March 1981, prior to being posted once again to Sarawak later in April of that year.

After that in April 1981, he was appointed as Sarawak Police Commissioner and retired between November and December 1983, in which he retired optionally at the age of 56 after a long service of more than 30 years.

== Death ==
On 1 October 2015, Yuen died at the age of 88 due to old age and heart failure in his sleep.

== Honours ==
- Malaya
  - Member of the Order of the Defender of the Realm (AMN) (1959)
- Malaysia
  - Recipient of the Malaysian Commemorative Medal (Bronze) (PPM) (1965)
  - Officer of the Order of the Defender of the Realm (KMN) (1972)
  - Companion of the Order of the Defender of the Realm (JMN) (1978)
  - Commander of the Order of Loyalty to the Crown of Malaysia (PSM) – Tan Sri (2011)
- Sarawak
  - Officer of the Most Exalted Order of the Star of Sarawak (PBS) (1972)
  - Recipient of the Civil Administration Medal (PPC)
  - Knight Commander of the Most Exalted Order of the Star of Sarawak (PNBS) – formerly Dato', now Dato Sri (1978)
- Perak
  - Knight Commander of the Order of Cura Si Manja Kini (DPCM) – Dato' (1977)
  - Knight Grand Commander of the Order of the Perak State Crown (SPMP) – Dato' Seri (1979)

=== Commonwealth Honours ===
- United Kingdom
  - Recipient of the Colonial Police Medal (CPM) (1957)
