= Mohd Sedek Mohd Ali =

Former Deputy Inspector-General of Police

Yang Berbahagia Tan Sri Dato' Seri Panglima Mohd Sedek Mohd Ali PSM SPTS DMSM DPTS DSAP JMN

Deputy Inspector-General of Police (Malaysia)
- In office 13 January 2004 – 3 January 2005
- Preceded by: Mohd Bakri Omar
- Succeeded by: Musa Hassan

Personal details
- Born: 31 January 1949 Alor Gajah, Malacca, Federation of Malaya
- Died: 22 January 2010 (aged 60) Kuala Lumpur Hospital

Mohd Sedek bin Mohd Ali (31 January 1949 – 22 January 2010) was a former Deputy Inspector-General of Police who served from 13 January 2004 to 3 January 2005.

== Early life ==
Mohd Sedek Mohd Ali was born on 31 January 1949 in Alor Gajah, Malacca. He was graduated from Leeds University, United Kingtom and also the University of Malaya.

== Police career ==
Mohd Sedek joined the Police Force on 3 January 1973 as Cadet Assistant Superintendent of Police. After complete training, he was placed to Criminal Investigation Department in Johor Bahru Police District Headquarters as Investigating Officer for 7 months. In addition, he also held positions such as Muar District Police Chief, Seremban District Police Chief, Head of Perak and Selangor Criminal Investigation Department, Kelantan Police Chief, Perak Police Chief, Deputy Director of Criminal Investigation Department, Director of Narcotics Criminal Investigation Department and Director of Internal Security and Public Order Department. On 13 January 2004, Mohd Sedek was appointed as Deputy Inspector-General of Police and he was retired a year later.

== Death ==
On 22 January 2010, Mohd Sedek died at Kuala Lumpur Hospital due to bad conditions at the age 60.

== Honours ==
- Malaysia :
  - Companion of the Order of the Defender of the Realm (JMN) (1995)
  - Commander of the Order of Loyalty to the Crown of Malaysia (PSM) – Tan Sri (2005)
- Malacca :
  - Companion Class I of the Exalted Order of Malacca (DMSM) – Datuk (1995)
- Perak :
  - Knight Commander of the Order of Taming Sari (DPTS) – Dato’ Pahlawan (1996)
  - Knight Grand Commander of the Order of Taming Sari (SPTS) – Dato’ Seri Panglima (2004)
- Pahang :
  - Knight Companion of the Order of Sultan Ahmad Shah of Pahang (DSAP) – Dato' (2002)
- Royal Malaysia Police :
  - Loyal Commander of the Most Gallant Police Order (PSPP) (1997)
