= Mohd Annuar Zaini =

Administrative figure in Malaysia

Yang Berbahagia Tan Sri Dato' Seri Mohd Annuar Zaini PSM DSA SPDK SPMP DPMP PMP AMP

President of Perak Islamic Religious and Malay Custom Council
- Incumbent
- Assumed office 1 January 2021
- Monarch: Sultan Nazrin Shah
- Preceded by: Wan Mohd Zahid Mohd Noordin

Member of State Senate of Perak
- Incumbent
- Assumed office February 2004
- Monarchs: Sultan Azlan Shah; Sultan Nazrin Shah

Chairman of BERNAMA
- In office 2004–2010
- Minister: Minister of Information; Abdul Kadir Sheikh Fadzir (2004–2006); Zainuddin Maidin (2006–2008); Ahmad Shabery Cheek (2008–2009) Minister of Information, Communication, Arts and Culture; Rais Yatim (2009–2010)
- Preceded by: Kalimullah Masheerul Hassan
- Succeeded by: Abdul Rahman Sulaiman

Special Advisor to the Prime Minister of Malaysia on the Northern Corridor Economic Region
- In office 2007–2009
- Prime Minister: Abdullah Ahmad Badawi
- Preceded by: Post established
- Succeeded by: Shahidan Kassim

Personal details
- Born: 16 October 1951 (age 74) Taiping, Perak, Federation of Malaya
- Spouse: Puan Sri Datin Seri Zavirah Shaari

Mohd Annuar bin Zaini (born 16 October 1951) is an administrative figure in Malaysia. He is currently the President of Perak Islamic Religious and Malay Custom Council, and a Non Official Member of the Member of State Senate of Perak. He was the Chairman of BERNAMA for six years.

== Background ==
Mohd Annuar Zaini was born in Taiping, Perak on 16 October 1951. His father was a policeman who retired from service in 1983. While in school, Mohd Annuar received an education award from the Ipoh PDRM Club Welfare Fund which was run by Hanif Omar when he was the Ipoh District Police Chief.

== Career ==
From 1981 to 1986 he was Senior Private Secretary to Musa Hitam, who was the Minister of Home Affairs at that time. From 1991 to 1993, he became the Chief Assistant Director of the Perak Economic Planning Unit. In 1993 he was appointed as the General Manager of Yayasan Perak and retired in 1999.

Since February 2004, Mohd Annuar bin Zaini has been the Chairman of Bernama. In addition, His Majesty the Sultan of Perak appointed him as a Non Official Member of State Senate of Perak. Then elected to be a Distinguished Fellow to the Institute of Strategic Studies and International Relations (ISIS) and a member of the Advisory Board of the Public Complaints Bureau in the Prime Minister's Department.

Dato' Mohd Annuar bin Zaini was appointed as Special Advisor to the Prime Minister on the Northern Corridor Economic Region from 30 August 2007 and as Chief Executive from 1 September 2008.

After retiring from public service, he became a member of the Board of Directors of Berjaya Group, owned by tycoon Vincent Tan. In addition, he became the chairman of Metropolitan Utilities Corporation Sdn Bhd. On 2021, Mohd Annuar Zaini was appointed as President of Perak Council of Islamic Religion and Malay Customs for Term 2021 to 2023.

Mohd Annuar Zaini was appointed as the new chairman of UDA Holdings Berhad (UDA) effective on 23 March 2023.

== Honours ==
- Malaysia
  - Commander of the Order of Loyalty to the Crown of Malaysia (PSM) – Tan Sri (2022)
- Kelantan
  - Knight Commander of the Order of the Life of the Crown of Kelantan (DJMK) – Dato' (revoked in 2019)
- Perak
  - Grand Knight of the Azlanii Royal Family Order (DSA) – Dato' Seri (2009)
  - Knight Grand Commander of the Order of the Perak State Crown (SPMP) – Dato' Seri (2008)
  - Knight Commander of the Order of the Perak State Crown (DPMP) – Dato' (1999)
  - Commander of the Order of the Perak State Crown (PMP) (1994)
  - Member of the Order of the Perak State Crown (AMP) (1986)
- Sabah
  - Grand Commander of the Order of Kinabalu (SPDK) – Datuk Seri Panglima (2007)
