= Hamdi Abu Bakar =

Malaysian politician

Yang Berbahagia Dato' Hamdi Abu Bakar DPMP PMP AMP JP JMN
- حامدي أبو بکر

Member of the Perak State Legislative Assembly for Pengkalan Baharu
- In office 1990–2013
- Preceded by: Abdul Malik Ahmad
- Succeeded by: Abdul Manaf Hashim

Personal details
- Born: Hamdi bin Abu Bakar; 1949
- Died: 23 May 2023 (aged 74)
- Citizenship: Malaysian
- Party: UMNO
- Other political affiliations: Barisan Nasional
- Occupation: Politician

Hamdi bin Abu Bakar is a Malaysian politician from UMNO. He was the Member of Perak State Legislative Assembly for Pengkalan Baharu in the Perak State Legislative Assembly from 1990 to 2013.

He died on 23 May 2023 due to cancer.

== Politics ==
On 12 October 2008, he lost in the UMNO Beruas branch chairman election to Abdul Manaf Hashim despite being the state assemblyman and the incumbent branch chairman.

== Election result ==
Perak State Legislative Assembly
Year	Constituency	Candidate	Votes	Pct	Opponent(s)	Votes	Pct	Ballots cast	Majority	Turnout
1990	N27 Pengkalan Baharu	Hamdi Abu Bakar (UMNO)	6,804	58.59%	Abdul Malik Ahmad (S46)	4,395	37.85%	11,613	2,409	72.87%
1995	N31 Pengkalan Baharu	Hamdi Abu Bakar (UMNO)	7,382	67.87%	Kamarudin Awang Teh (S46)	3,083	28.35%	10,876	4,299	65.03%
1999	N31 Pengkalan Baharu	Hamdi Abu Bakar (UMNO)	5,758	54.44%	Hisham Mat Ali (PAS)	4,517	42.71%	10,576	1,241	63.85%
2004	N36 Pengkalan Baharu	Hamdi Abu Bakar (UMNO)	6,240	58.36%	Kamarudin Awang Teh (PKR)	4,062	37.99%	10,693	2,178	68.87%
2008	N36 Pengkalan Baharu	Hamdi Abu Bakar (UMNO)	5,375	48.39%	Abu Bakar Hussian (PAS)	5,361	48.26%	11,108	14	72.78%

== Honours ==
- Malaysia
  - Companion of the Order of the Defender of the Realm (JMN) (2013)
- Perak
  - Member of the Order of the Perak State Crown (AMP) (1989)
  - Commander of the Order of the Perak State Crown (PMP) (1992)
  - Justice of the Peace (JP) (1993)
  - Knight Commander of the Order of the Perak State Crown (DPMP) – Dato' (1996)
