= Salleh Mat Som =

Former Malaysia police officer

Dato' Seri Panglima Salleh Mat Som
- Born: Salleh bin Mat Som; 30 December 1948; Ulu Kinta, Perak
- Died: 17 July 2008 (aged 59); Kuala Lumpur
- Occupation: former Malaysian police officer

Dato' Seri Panglima Salleh bin Mat Som (30 December 1948 – 17 July 2008) is a former Malaysian police officer.

== Early life ==
Salleh Mat Som was born on 30 December 1948 in Ulu Kinta, Perak.

== Police career ==
Salleh joined the Police Force on 1 June 1973 as Inspector and holds a bachelor's degree from the Royal College of Defence Studies (RCDS) London. After completing basic police training, he was placed as Investigate Officer of Penang Police Contingent Criminal Investigation Department until 1976. During his career, he had served Terengganu Police Chief, Penang Police Chief, deputy director of Bukit Aman Criminal Investigation Department, Director of Bukit Aman Criminal Investigation Department and deputy director of Bukit Aman Commercial Crime Department. In addition, he also became first Director of Bukit Aman Narcotics Crime Investigation Department from 15 April 1996 to 1 December 1997 and third Director from 4 January 1999 to 30 September 1999.

His last post in Police Force was Director of Bukit Aman Internal Security and Public Order Department, he was retired on 2 December 2004.

== Death ==
Salleh died at 17 July 2008 due cancer.

== Honours ==
- Malaysia :
  - Member of the Order of the Defender of the Realm (AMN) (1984)
  - Officer of the Order of the Defender of the Realm (KMN) (1991)
  - Companion of the Order of the Defender of the Realm (JMN) (1996)
  - Commander of the Order of Meritorious Service (PJN) – Datuk (2003)
- Royal Malaysia Police :
  - Loyal Commander of the Most Gallant Police Order (PSPP) (1997)
- Perak :
  - Knight Commander of the Order of Taming Sari (DPTS) – Dato' Pahlawan (1993)
  - Knight Grand Commander of the Order of Taming Sari (SPTS) – Dato' Seri Panglima (2003)
- Penang :
  - Companion of the Order of the Defender of State (DMPN) – Dato' (1994)
