= Zakiah Laidin =

Malaysian policewoman

Dato' Pahlawan DPTS, JSM, KMN Zakiah Laidin
- Born: Zakiah binti Laidin; 1 May 1938; Batu Gajah, Perak
- Died: 12 November 2011 (aged 73); Jalan Tiang Seri, Taman Bukit Jelutong, Shah Alam, Selangor
- Resting place: Tanah Perkuburan Islam Bukit Kiara
- Occupation: former Deputy Director of Management (Services/Staffing) of the Royal Malaysia Police (RMP)
- Spouse: Yahya Yeop Ishak
- Children: 2

Dato' Pahlawan Zakiah binti Laidin (1 May 1938 – 12 November 2011) is a former Deputy Director of Management (Services/Staffing) of the Royal Malaysia Police (RMP). She is the first Malaysian policewoman to hold the highest position in the Police Force.

== Police career ==
She served in the RMP for 36 years with the last rank as Deputy Commissioner of Police when serving as Deputy Director of Management at the Bukit Aman Police Headquarters before retiring in 1993. She was the first female police officer to be entrusted with the position of Contingent Administrative Officer, Public Relations Superintendent, Assistant Police Commissioner. Police Service Branch, Police Supervisor and several other positions.

She was selected as the first Asian female police officer to attend a three month course at the Federal Bureau of Investigation (FBI) National Academy in Virginia, USA in 1980.

== Death ==
On 12 November 2011, she died of old age, at the age of 73 years. The RMP Media Center reported that he died at his house in Jalan Tiang Seri, Taman Bukit Jelutong, Shah Alam, Selangor.

Her body was prayed at the Bukit Jelutong Mosque before being buried at the Bukit Kiara Islamic Cemetery.

== Honours ==
- Malaysia
  - Officer of the Order of the Defender of the Realm (K.M.N.) (1979)
  - Companion of the Order of Loyalty to the Crown of Malaysia (J.S.M.) (1992)
- Perak
  - Knight Commander of the Order of Taming Sari (D.P.T.S.) - Dato' Pahlawan (1992)
