= Pengkalan Baharu =

Political subdivision in Malaysia

Pengkalan Baharu (N36)
Perak constituency

State constituency
- Legislature: Perak State Legislative Assembly
MLA
Azman Noh
BN
- Constituency created: 1959
- First contested: 1959
- Last contested: 2022

Demographics
- Electors (2022): 22,573

Pengkalan Baharu is a state constituency in Perak, Malaysia, that has been represented in the Perak State Legislative Assembly.

== Demographics ==
Ethnic breakdown of Pengkalan Baharu's electorate as of 2022
1. Malay (69.3%)
2. Chinese (19.8%)
3. Indian (10.3%)
4. Other ethnicities (0.50%)

== History ==
=== Polling districts ===
According to the federal gazette issued on 31 October 2022, the Pengkalan Baharu constituency is divided into 20 polling districts.

State constituency	Polling Districts	Code	Location
Pengkalan Baharu (N36）	Kampong Pintu Gerbang	068/36/01	Dewan Orang Ramai Pintu Gerbang
Pengkalan Baharu (N36）	Dendang	068/36/02	SK Dendang
Pengkalan Baharu (N36）	Paya Ara	068/36/03	SK Dendang
Pengkalan Baharu (N36）	Bruas	068/36/04	SK Beruas
Pengkalan Baharu (N36）	Bruas Timor	068/36/05	SK Bruas
Pengkalan Baharu (N36）	Bruas Barat	068/36/06	SK Bruas
Pengkalan Baharu (N36）	Ladang Bruas	068/36/07	SJK (T) Beruas
Pengkalan Baharu (N36）	Ulu Bruas	068/36/08	SJK (T) Beruas
Pengkalan Baharu (N36）	Panchor	068/36/09	SK Panchor
Pengkalan Baharu (N36）	Pengkalan Baharu	068/36/10	SK Pengkalan Baharu
Pengkalan Baharu (N36）	Kampong Baharu Sungai Batu	068/36/11	SJK (C) Sungai Batu
Pengkalan Baharu (N36）	Ladang Huntly	068/36/12	SK Ladang Huntly
Pengkalan Baharu (N36）	Kampong Kota	068/36/13	SK Kampong Kota
Pengkalan Baharu (N36）	Kampong Tengah	068/36/14	SK Gelong Gajah
Pengkalan Baharu (N36）	Gelong Gajah	068/36/15	SK Gelong Gajah
Pengkalan Baharu (N36）	Kampong Banjar	068/36/16	Dewan Orang Ramai Kampong Banjar
Pengkalan Baharu (N36）	Kampong Jering New Village	068/36/17	SJK (C) Kampung Jering
Pengkalan Baharu (N36）	Jalan Ayer Tawar	068/36/18	SK Ayer Tawar
Pengkalan Baharu (N36）	Changkat Chermin	068/36/19	SK Changkat Chermin
Pengkalan Baharu (N36）	Paya Nibong	068/36/20	Dewan Orang Ramai Paya Nibong

=== Representation history ===
Members of the Legislative Assembly for Pengkalan Baharu
Assembly	No	Years	Name	Party
Constituency created
Pengkalan Bharu
1st	N19	1959-1964	Ishak Mohamed	Alliance (UMNO)
2nd	N19	1964-1969	Ishak Mohamed	Alliance (UMNO)
		1969-1971	Assembly Dissolved	
3rd	N19	1971-1973	Ishak Mohamed	Alliance (UMNO)
3rd	N19	1973-1974	Ishak Mohamed	BN (UMNO)
Pengkalan Baharu
4th	N25	1974-1978	Abdul Malik Ahmad	BN (UMNO)
5th	N25	1978-1982	Abdul Malik Ahmad	BN (UMNO)
6th	N25	1982-1986	Abdul Malik Ahmad	BN (UMNO)
7th	N27	1986-1990	Abdul Malik Ahmad	BN (UMNO)
8th	N27	1990-1995	Hamdi Abu Bakar	BN (UMNO)
9th	N31	1995-1999	Hamdi Abu Bakar	BN (UMNO)
10th	N31	1999-2004	Hamdi Abu Bakar	BN (UMNO)
11th	N36	2004-2008	Hamdi Abu Bakar	BN (UMNO)
12th	N36	2008-2013	Hamdi Abu Bakar	BN (UMNO)
13th	N36	2013-2018	Abdul Manaf Hashim	BN (UMNO)
14th	N36	2018-2022	Abdul Manaf Hashim	BN (UMNO)
15th	N36	2022–present	Azman Noh	BN (UMNO)

== Election results ==
Perak state election, 2022: Pengkalan Baharu
Party	Candidate	Votes	%	∆%
BN	Azman Noh	6,665	40.58	▼5.22
PN	Ahmad Faisal Mansor	5,589	34.03	▲34.03
PH	Abdul Jais Ashfaq Ahmed	4,045	24.63	▲24.63
PEJUANG	Abdul Halim Mat Isa	125	0.76	▲0.76
Total valid votes		16,424	100.00	
Total rejected ballots		253		
Unreturned ballots		36		
Turnout		16,713	74.04	▼4.96
Registered electors		22,573		
Majority		1,076	6.55	▼5.23
BN hold		Swing		

Perak state election, 2018: Pengkalan Baharu
Party	Candidate	Votes	%	∆%
BN	Abdul Manaf Hashim	6,312	45.80	▼12.70
PKR	Murad Abdullah	4,688	34.02	▲34.02
PAS	Zakaria Hashim	2,781	20.18	▼20.63
Total valid votes		13,781	96.51	
Total rejected ballots		302	2.11	
Unreturned ballots		197	1.38	
Turnout		14,280	79.00	▼3.60
Registered electors		18,076		
Majority		1,624	11.78	▼5.91
BN hold		Swing		
Source(s) "RESULTS OF CONTESTED ELECTION AND STATEMENTS OF THE POLL AFTER THE OFFICIAL ADDITION OF VOTES".

Perak state election, 2013: Pengkalan Baharu
Party	Candidate	Votes	%	∆%
BN	Abdul Manaf Hashim	8,281	58.50	▲8.43
PAS	Khairuddin Abd Malik	5,776	40.81	▼9.12
Independent	Ahmad Nizam Ibrahim	98	0.69	▲0.69
Total valid votes		14,155	98.20	
Total rejected ballots		233	1.62	
Unreturned ballots		26	0.18	
Turnout		14,414	82.60	▲9.82
Registered electors		17,459		
Majority		2,505	17.69	▲17.55
BN hold		Swing		
Source(s) "KEPUTUSAN PILIHAN RAYA UMUM DEWAN UNDANGAN NEGERI". Archived from the original on 2013-06-07.

Perak state election, 2008: Pengkalan Baharu
Party	Candidate	Votes	%	∆%
BN	Hamdi Abu Bakar	5,375	50.07	▼10.50
PAS	Abu Bakar Hussian	5,361	49.93	▲49.93
Total valid votes		10,736	96.65	
Total rejected ballots		334	3.01	
Unreturned ballots		38	0.34	
Turnout		11,108	72.78	▲3.91
Registered electors		15,262		
Majority		14	0.14	▼22.44
BN hold		Swing		
Source(s) "KEPUTUSAN PILIHAN RAYA UMUM DEWAN UNDANGAN NEGERI PERAK BAGI TAHUN 2008".

Perak state election, 2004: Pengkalan Baharu
Party	Candidate	Votes	%	∆%
BN	Hamdi Abu Bakar	6,240	60.57	▲4.53
PKR	Kamarudin Awang Teh	4,062	37.99	▲37.99
Total valid votes		10,302	96.34	
Total rejected ballots		367	3.43	
Unreturned ballots		24	0.22	
Turnout		10,693	68.87	▲5.03
Registered electors		15,527		
Majority		2,178	22.58	▲10.50
BN hold		Swing		
Source(s) "KEPUTUSAN PILIHAN RAYA UMUM DEWAN UNDANGAN NEGERI PERAK BAGI TAHUN 2004".

Perak state election, 1999: Pengkalan Baharu
Party	Candidate	Votes	%	∆%
BN	Hamdi Abu Bakar	5,758	56.04	▼14.49
PAS	Hisham Mat Ali	4,517	43.96	▲43.96
Total valid votes		10,275	97.15	
Total rejected ballots		301	2.85	
Unreturned ballots		0	0	
Turnout		10,576	63.85	▼1.18
Registered electors		16,563		
Majority		1,241	12.08	▼28.99
BN hold		Swing		
Source(s) "KEPUTUSAN PILIHAN RAYA UMUM DEWAN UNDANGAN NEGERI PERAK BAGI TAHUN 1999".

Perak state election, 1995: Pengkalan Baharu
Party	Candidate	Votes	%	∆%
BN	Hamdi Abu Bakar	7,382	70.53	▲9.45
S46	Kamarudin Awang Teh	3,083	29.46	▼9.45
Total valid votes		10,465	96.22	
Total rejected ballots		383	3.52	
Unreturned ballots		28	0.26	
Turnout		10,876	65.03	▼7.84
Registered electors		16,724		
Majority		4,299	41.07	▲18.91
BN hold		Swing		
Source(s) "KEPUTUSAN PILIHAN RAYA UMUM DEWAN UNDANGAN NEGERI PERAK BAGI TAHUN 1995".

Perak state election, 1990: Pengkalan Baharu
Party	Candidate	Votes	%	∆%
BN	Hamdi Abu Bakar	6,804	61.08	▼4.03
S46	Abdul Malik Ahmad	4,395	38.92	▲38.92
Total valid votes		11,199	96.44	
Total rejected ballots		414	3.56	
Unreturned ballots		0	0	
Turnout		11,613	72.87	▲3.22
Registered electors		15,937		
Majority		2,409	22.16	▼18.64
BN hold		Swing		
Source(s) "KEPUTUSAN PILIHAN RAYA UMUM DEWAN UNDANGAN NEGERI PERAK BAGI TAHUN 1990".

Perak state election, 1986: Pengkalan Baharu
Party	Candidate	Votes	%	∆%
BN	Abdul Malik Ahmad	6,174	65.11	▼9.49
DAP	Kamarudin Awang Teh	2,305	24.31	▲6.28
PAS	Mohd Hata Imran	1,003	10.58	▲3.21
Total valid votes		9,482	100.00	
Total rejected ballots		249		
Unreturned ballots		0		
Turnout		9,731	69.65	▼7.20
Registered electors		13,972		
Majority		3,869	40.80	▼15.77
BN hold		Swing		
Source(s) "KEPUTUSAN PILIHAN RAYA UMUM DEWAN UNDANGAN NEGERI PERAK BAGI TAHUN 1986".

Perak state election, 1982: Pengkalan Bharu
Party	Candidate	Votes	%	∆%
BN	Abdul Malik Ahmad	7,129	74.60	▲15.30
DAP	How Choon Aun	1,723	18.03	▼9.61
PAS	Jaafar Puteh	704	7.37	▼2.33
Total valid votes		9,556	100.00	
Total rejected ballots		200		
Unreturned ballots		0		
Turnout		9,756	76.85	▼2.26
Registered electors		12,695		
Majority		5,406	56.57	▲24.90
BN hold		Swing		

Perak state election, 1978: Pengkalan Bharu
Party	Candidate	Votes	%	∆%
BN	Abdul Malik Ahmad	4,888	59.31	▲6.02
DAP	Kathirgamer a/l Nagalingam	2,278	27.64	▲13.58
PAS	Jaafar Puteh	799	9.69	▲9.69
Independent	Ismail Ahmad	277	3.36	▼24.40
Total valid votes		8,242	100.00	
Total rejected ballots		464		
Unreturned ballots		0		
Turnout		8,706	79.11	▲4.13
Registered electors		11,005		
Majority		2,610	31.67	▲6.14
BN hold		Swing		

Perak state election, 1974: Pengkalan Bharu
Party	Candidate	Votes	%	∆%
BN	Abdul Malik Ahmad	3,783	53.29	▲53.29
Independent	Kathirgamer a/l Nagalingam	1,971	27.76	▲27.76
DAP	Ling Leong Kwong	998	14.06	▲14.06
PEKEMAS	Zainuddin Airs	347	4.89	▲4.89
Total valid votes		7,099	100.00	
Total rejected ballots		424		
Unreturned ballots		0		
Turnout		7,523	74.98	▲3.32
Registered electors		10,034		
Majority		1,812	25.52	▲12.93
BN hold		Swing		-

Perak state election, 1969: Pengkalan Bharu
Party	Candidate	Votes	%	∆%
Alliance	Ishak Mohamed	4,689	56.30	▼0.53
PMIP	Abdul Aziz Hashim	3,640	43.70	▲20.26
Total valid votes		8,329	100.00	
Total rejected ballots		1,458		
Unreturned ballots		0		
Turnout		9,787	71.65	▼5.85
Registered electors		13,659		
Majority		1,049	12.59	▼20.80
Alliance hold		Swing		

Perak state election, 1964: Pengkalan Bharu
Party	Candidate	Votes	%	∆%
Alliance	Ishak Mohamed	5,259	56.83	▲9.10
PMIP	Abdul Rahim Mat Salleh	2,169	23.44	▼3.98
UDP	Mokhtar A. Manap	1,826	19.73	▲19.73
Total valid votes		9,254	100.00	
Total rejected ballots		392		
Unreturned ballots		0		
Turnout		9,646	77.50	▲13.42
Registered electors		12,446		
Majority		3,090	33.39	▲13.07
Alliance hold		Swing		

Perak state election, 1959: Pengkalan Bharu
Party	Candidate	Votes	%
Alliance	Ishak Mohamed	3,503	47.73
PMIP	Abdul Rahim Mat Salleh	2,012	27.42
Independent	L. Kathirgamen	1,824	24.85
Total valid votes		7,339	100.00
Total rejected ballots		206	
Unreturned ballots		0	
Turnout		7,545	64.08
Registered electors		11,774	
Majority		1,491	20.32
This was a new constituency created.
