= Order of the Perak State Crown =

Knighthood order of the Sultanate of Perak

The Most Honourable Order of the Crown of Perak State Darjah Kebesaran Mahkota Negeri Perak Yang Amat Mulia

Awarded by Sultan of Perak
- Type: Order
- Founded: 12 December 1957
- Status: Currently constituted
- Founder: Sultan Yusuff Izzuddin Shah
- Sovereign: Sultan Nazrin Muizzuddin Shah
- Grades: Knight Grand Commander (SPMP); Knight Commander (DPMP); Commander (PMP); Member (AMP)
- Post-nominals: S.P.M.P.; D.P.M.P.; P.M.P.; A.M.P.

Statistics
- First induction: 1963
- Last induction: 2024
- Total inductees: 182 Knight Grand Commanders; 1196 Knight Commanders; 1555 Commanders; 5304 Members

Precedence
- Next (higher): Order of Taming Sari
- Next (lower): Justice of the Peace
- Knight Grand Commander Knight Commander / Commander / Member; Ribbon bar of the order

The Most Honourable Order of the Crown of Perak State (Malay: Darjah Kebesaran Mahkota Negeri Perak Yang Amat Mulia) is knighthood order of the Sultanate of Perak.

== Background ==
It was founded by Sultan Yusuf Izzuddin Shah on 12 December 1957.

== Timeline of ribbon ==
Order	Class	1957-1969	1969-1977	1977-2000	2000–2011	Since 2011
Order of the Perak State Crown (1957)	S.P.M.P.					
Order of the Perak State Crown (1957)	lower classes					

== Classes ==
There are four classes of the order:

- Knight Grand Commander (Dato' Seri Paduka Mahkota Perak, post-nominal letters : S.P.M.P.)
- Knight Commander (Dato' Paduka Mahkota Perak, post-nominal letters : D.P.M.P.)
- Commander (Paduka Mahkota Perak, post-nominal letters : P.M.P).
- Member (Ahli Mahkota Perak, post-nominal letters : A.M.P.)

== Recipients ==
=== Knight Grand Commander (SPMP) ===
The grand commanders receives the title Dato’ Seri and his wife Datin Seri

- 1963: Idris Al- Mutawakil Allahi Shah
- 1963: Chik Mohd Yusus
- 1963: Wan Hamarudin bin Wan Abdul Jalil
- 1963: Mohd Razalli bin Mohd Ali Wasi
- 1963: Shahriman bin Raja Abdul Hamid
- 1964: Abdul Razak Hussein
- 1964: Ahmad Bin Said
- 1964: Ahmad Hisham Bin Raja Abdul Malek
- 1964: Wan Mohd Razalli Bin Wan Mohd Isa
- 1964: Mohd Hashim Bin Jeragan Abdul Shukur
- 1965: MUZWIN BT. RAJA ARIFF SHAH
- 1965: Raja Musa Ibni
- 1965: Meor Abdullah Bin Meor Mohd Jawi
- 1966: Raja Ekram
- 1966: Mustapha Albakri Bib Hassan
- 1966: Osman Talib
- 1966: J.E.S. Crawford
- 1966: Syed Zahiruddin Syed Hassan
- 1967: Hussein Yaacob
- 1967: Lau Pak Khuan
- 1967: Harvey Peterson
- 1969: Raja Azlan Shah
- 1970: Jaafar Abdul Raof
- 1970: Mohamed Salleh Ismael
- 1970: Abdul Aziz Mat Jabar
- 1970: Megat Khas Megat Omar
- 1970: K.R. Sithambaram Pillai
- 1970: Chan Swee Ho
- 1974: Mohammed Hanif Omar
- 1979: Ahmad Nordin Raja Shahbudin
- 1979: Chong Kok Lim
- 1979: Yuen Yuet Leng
- 1979: Liew Why Hone
- 1981: Mohd Khalil Hussein
- 1981: Shaari Shafie
- 1985: Mohd Nurzid Mohd Wali
- 1989: Ling Liong Sik
- 1989: Samy Vellu
- 1989: Lim Keng Yaik
- 1989: Rafidah Aziz
- 1989: Abdul Malik Noordin
- 1989: Lee Loy Seng
- 1989: Lim Goh Tong
- 1989: BORGE BEK-NIELSEN (Honorary)
- 1990: Ahmad Sarji Abdul Hamid
- 1990: Zain Azraai Zainal Abidin
- 1990: Stanley Ho Hung-sun (Honorary)
- 2008: Ahmad Zahid Hamidi
- 2008: Mohammad Nizar Jamaluddin
- 2008: Ismail Shahudin
- 2008: Mohd Annuar Zaini
- 2008: Ong Ka Chuan
- 2008: Selvamany Navachitra Soudamany
- 2008: Wan Mohd Isa Wan Ahmad
- 2012: Michelle Yeoh Choo Kheng
- 2015: Burhanuddin al-Helmy
- 2015: Aminuddin Baki
- 2015: Hamzah Zainudin
- 2015: Arsyad Ayub
- 2015: Ranjit Singh Ajit Singh
- 2016: Mah Siew Keong
- 2016: Zainal Adzam Abdul Ghani
- 2016: Wan Mohd Zahid Mohd Nordin
- 2017: Mohd Khamil Jamil
- 2017: Zainal Rahim Seman
- 2017: Nazira Safiya
- 2018: Ahmad Faizal Azumu
- 2018: Aishah Ong
- 2019: Ayop Hashim
- 2021: Saarani Mohamad
- 2024: Syed Danial Syed Ahmad
- 2024: Wan Suraya Radzi

=== Knight Commander (DPMP) ===
The commanders receives the title Dato' and his wife Datin

- 1963: Osman Talib
- 1963: Mohd Esah Kulop Shah
- 1963: Abdul Aziz Mohd Jabar
- 1963: Shaari Shafie
- 1963: J.E.S. Crawford
- 1963: Jal Manecksha
- 1963: Shaari Abdul Wahab
- 1963: Meor Aliff Bin M Alwi
- 1963: Ramly Bin Abdullah
- 1963: Mustaffa Al Bakri
- 1963: Mohamed Yusof Bin Ahmad
- 1963: Liew Why Hone
- 1963: Mohd Ali Zaini Bin Mohd Zain
- 1963: Leong Kee Nyean
- 1963: Lau Pak Khuan
- 1963: Shaaribin Haji Abdul Wahab
- 1964: Tan Siew Ng
- 1964: Syed Zahiruddin Bin Sy Hassan
- 1964: Megat Khas Megat Omar
- 1964: Muthu Thamby Pillai
- 1969: Ishak Mahmud
- 1969: Sheikh Abdul Rahman
- 1969: Murad Mahmood
- 1969: Mohd Sany Abdul Ghaffar
- 1978: Richard Ho Ung Hun
- 1980: Mak Hon Kam
- 1980: Gurmukh Singh
- 1980: T. Pathamanathan
- 1980: Leong Ah Kow
- 1981: Othman Abdul Manan
- 1981: S. Dharmalingam
- 1981: Hew Sze Tong
- 1981: Chuah Yew Aun
- 1981: Malik Nordin
- 1982: Abdul Malik Noordin
- 1982: Ling Liong Sik
- 1982: Ng Kuok Thai
- 1982: Yaakub Abdul Hamid
- 1982: Wong Choo Thong
- 1989: Au How Cheong
- 1989: Loke Yuen Yow
- 1989: S. RAJASEGARAN
- 1989: PARAMJIT SINGH A/L TARA SINGH
- 1989: Azumu Tak
- 1989: Mohd Hamidi Mohd Razali
- 1989: Mohd Kharin Ibrahim
- 1989: Chan Kai Cheong
- 1989: Gurcharan Singh
- 1989: Motohiro Otsuka (Honorary)
- 1990: Ong Ka Chuan
- 1990: MOHAMAD BIN JAMRAH
- 1990: ABDUL RAMAN BIN SULAIMAN
- 1991: Wan Hashim Wan Teh
- 1996: Hamdi Abu Bakar
- 2001: Khamsiyah Yeop
- 2001: Michelle Yeoh Choo Kheng
- 2001: Ho Cheng Wang
- 2001: Yik Phooi Hong
- 2001: Mat Isa Ismail
- 2001: Onn Bin Hamzah
- 2001: K. Munisamy
- 2001: Hiew Yew Can
- 2001: Ahmad Zahid Hamidi
- 2001: Raja Abdullah Bin Raja Yaacob
- 2001: Ismail Bin Dolah Harun
- 2001: Samsudin Bin Hashim
- 2001: Kok Soo Chon
- 2001: Md Mydin Md Sheriff
- 2007: Tajuddin Abdul Rahman
- 2008: Ngeh Koo Ham
- 2009: Mah Hang Soon
- 2009: Roshidi Hashim
- 2009: Mohd Tarmizi Idris
- 2010: Abdul Manaf Hashim
- 2010: Rais Hussin Mohamed Ariff
- 2011: Sham Mat Sahat
- 2018: Mohammad Shatar Sabran
- 2018: Raja Nurshirwan Zainal Abidin
- 2018: Ding Lay Ming
- 2018: Rumaizi bin Baharin
- 2018: Ahameed Tarmizi Ramli
- 2018: Ahmad Anuar Othman
- 2018: Johan Shamsuddin Sabaruddin
- 2018: Toh Maharaja Dewa Mohd Rasid Hussin Shah
- 2018: Ahmad Awang
- 2018: Goh Seng Kuang
- 2018: Ho Kay Tat
- 2018: Jeffri Salim Davidson
- 2018: Shahriman bin Shamsuddin
- 2018: Sinnathamby Senathi Rajah
- 2022: S M Komathy Suppiah
- 2022: Zakri Jaafar
- 2022: Rosli Isa
- 2022: Anis Rizana Mohd Zainudin
- 2022: Jaafar Sidek Abdul Rahman
- 2022: Shamshuzaman Sulaiman
- 2022: Ker Hong Bee
- 2022: Zulkipli Nasri
- 2022: Ab. Rahman Thobroni Mohd Mansor
- 2022: Mubarak Ali Gulam Rasul
- 2022: Hussamuddin Yaacub
- 2022: Alwi Mohamed Yunus
- 2022: Lee Fuh Yen
- 2022: Sheila Eleanor De Costa
- 2022: Hajah Mehrun Siraj
- 2023: Lee Boon Chye

== See also ==
- Orders, decorations, and medals of the Malaysian states and federal territories#Perak
- Orders, decorations, and medals of Perak
- Order of precedence in Perak
- List of post-nominal letters (Perak)
