= Norian Mai =

Malaysian police chief

Yang Berbahagia Tan Sri Norian Mai PMN PSM SSAP SIMP SSMZ SPTS PNBS PGDK DPTS SMT PGPP KMN
- نوريان ماي

6th Inspector-General of Police (Malaysia)
- In office 8 January 1999 – 4 November 2003
- Monarchs: Ja'afar; Salahuddin; Sirajuddin
- Minister: Mahathir Mohamad; Abdullah Ahmad Badawi
- Preceded by: Abdul Rahim Mohd. Noor
- Succeeded by: Mohd Bakri Omar

Personal details
- Born: 5 November 1946 (age 79) Hilir Perak, Perak, Malayan Union
- Spouse: Puan Sri Rokiah Ismail
- Children: 4

Norian Mai (born 5 November 1946) is a Malaysian police officer who served as the inspector-general of police of Malaysia from 8 January 1999 until his retirement on 4 November 2003.

== Education ==
Norian attended Government English School in Teluk Intan in 1959 and Sultan Alam Shah School in Kuala Lumpur in 1964. He graduated from the University of Malaya in 1982 with a Bachelor of Arts in history.

== Career ==
Norian joined the Royal Malaysia Police as a Cadet Assistant Superintendent on 8 November 1969. He served various positions including Officer-in-Charge of Police District (OCPD) of Jasin and OCPD of Petaling Jaya.

On 31 December 1984, he was appointed Terengganu Police Chief. On 31 December 1992, he was appointed Selangor Police Chief. On 1 April 1994, he transferred to Bukit Aman to become Director of Special Branch. Norian Mai became the Deputy Inspector-General of Police on 6 May 1997 who replaced Samsuri Arshad.

=== Inspector-General of Police ===
On 8 January 1999, Norian became the Inspector-General of Police when his predecessor Abdul Rahim Mohd Noor resigned over the beating of former Deputy Prime Minister Anwar Ibrahim at the Bukit Aman police lock-up.

== Post-career ==
Norian founded Yayasan Pengaman Malaysia in 2011 and became its Founding Chairman. He has been Chairman of Perdana Global Peace Foundation as well.

In 2019, Norian sat in the Royal Commission of Inquiry on Wang Kelian along with seven other members as deputy to Chairman Arifin Zakaria.

On 9 February 2021, he was appointed to the Emergency Independent Special Committee along with 18 other members to advise the Yang di-Pertuan Agong on matters related to the ending of the Proclamation of Emergency in the country.

== Honours ==
- Malaysia
  - Commander of the Order of the Defender of the Realm (PMN) – Tan Sri (2001)
  - Commander of the Order of Loyalty to the Crown of Malaysia (PSM) – Tan Sri (1998)
  - Officer of the Order of the Defender of the Realm (KMN) (1983)
- Royal Malaysia Police
  - Courageous Commander of the Most Gallant Police Order (PGPP) (1997)
- Pahang
  - Knight Grand Companion of the Order of Sultan Ahmad Shah of Pahang (SSAP) – Dato' Sri (2003)
  - Knight Grand Companion of the Order of the Crown of Pahang (SIMP) – formerly Dato', now Dato' Indera (1997)
- Perak
  - Knight Grand Commander of the Order of Taming Sari (SPTS) – Dato' Seri Panglima (1998)
  - Knight Commander of the Order of Taming Sari (DPTS) – Dato' Pahlawan (1993)
- Sabah
  - Commander of the Order of Kinabalu (PGDK) – Datuk (1996)
- Sarawak
  - Knight Commander of the Most Exalted Order of the Star of Sarawak (PNBS) – Dato Sri (2003)
- Terengganu
  - Knight Grand Companion of the Order of Sultan Mizan Zainal Abidin of Terengganu (SSMZ) – Dato' Seri (2003)
  - Companion of the Order of the Crown of Terengganu (SMT) (1987)

=== Foreign honours ===
- Thailand
  - Knight Grand Cross of the Order of the Crown of Thailand (GCCT) (2000)
- Indonesia
  - National Police Meritorious Service Star 1st Class (BB) (2002)
- Singapore
  - Recipient of the Darjah Utama Bakti Cemerlang (DUBC) (2003)

== Family ==
Norian is married to Rokiah Ismail and has four children.
