= Perak Family Order of Sultan Nazrin Shah =

Chivalric order of Perak

The Most Esteemed Perak Family Order of Sultan Nazrin Shah Darjah Kerabat Sri Paduka Sultan Nazrin Shah Perak Yang Amat Dihormati

Awarded by Sultan of Perak
- Type: Chivalric order
- Established: 2015
- Status: Currently constituted
- Founder: Sultan Nazrin Shah
- Grand Master: Sultan Nazrin Shah
- Grades: Grand Commander
- Post-nominals: S.P.S.N.

Statistics
- First induction: 2015
- Last induction: 2016
- Total inductees: 2

Precedence
- Next (higher): Azlanii Royal Family Order
- Next (lower): Order of Cura Si Manja Kini
- Ribbon bar

The Most Esteemed Perak Family Order of Sultan Nazrin Shah (Malay: Darjah Kerabat Sri Paduka Sultan Nazrin Shah Perak Yang Amat Dihormati) is an order of chivalry of the state of Perak constituted by Sultan Nazrin Shah of Perak in 2015 following his installation as the Sultan of Perak in May 2015. The order replaced the Perak Family Order of Sultan Azlan Shah which became dormant following the demise of Sultan Azlan Shah of Perak.

The order is conferred upon individuals who have contributed towards the Sultan, the royal family and Perak to the highest esteem.

== Grades ==
The Perak Family Order of Sultan Nazrin Shah is conferred in the sole grade of Grand Commander. The recipients bear the title of "Dato' Seri Diraja" while the wives of the male recipients bear the title of "Datin Seri Diraja". Husbands of the female recipients are not entitled to bear any title.

== Insignia ==
The insignia of the Perak Family Order of Sultan Nazrin Shah comprises a collar, a sash, a star and a badge. The sash of the order is a purple silk band with two gold stripes at both ends. The star and badge of the order consists of the bust of Sultan Nazrin Shah facing left.

== Recipients ==
As of date, only two individuals have been conferred with the Perak Family Order of Sultan Nazrin Shah:

- 2015: Dato' Seri DiRaja Dr. Haji Ahmad Zahid Hamidi
- 2016: Tun Dato' Seri DiRaja Mohammed Hanif Omar

== See also ==
- Orders, decorations, and medals of the Malaysian states and federal territories#Perak
- Orders, decorations, and medals of Perak
- List of post-nominal letters (Perak)
