= Mohammed Hanif Omar =

Malaysian police officer (1939–2024)

Yang Amat Berbahagia Tun Dato' Seri DiRaja Mohammed Hanif Omar SSM SPSN SPMJ SPTS SPNS SSSA PMN DSA SIMP SPMP DA DHMS KMN PPT BKT PKB PPA PPM PCh PM DUBC
- محمد حنيف عمر

4th Inspector-General of Police (Malaysia)
- In office 8 June 1974 – 15 January 1994
- Monarchs: Abdul Halim; Yahya Petra; Ahmad Shah; Iskandar; Azlan Shah
- Minister: Ghazali Shafie; Musa Hitam; Mahathir Mohamad
- Preceded by: Abdul Rahman Hashim
- Succeeded by: Abdul Rahim Mohd Noor

Personal details
- Born: 16 January 1939 Teluk Intan, Perak, Federated Malay States, British Malaya (now Malaysia)
- Died: 20 April 2024 (aged 85) Shah Alam, Selangor, Malaysia
- Resting place: Bukit Kiara Muslim Cemetery, Kuala Lumpur
- Spouse: Hamidah Abdul Hamid
- Children: 5
- Education: University of Buckingham; University of Malaya, Singapore; Malay College Kuala Kangsar

Mohammed Hanif bin Omar (Jawi: محمد حنيف بن عمر; 16 January 1939 – 20 April 2024) was a Malaysian police officer who served as the 4th Inspector-General of Royal Malaysia Police from June 1974 to January 1994. Assuming office at the age of 35, he was the youngest police officer appointed to the top post. He was also the longest-serving Inspector General of Police for 20 years.

Born in Teluk Intan, Perak on 16 January 1939, Hanif Omar became the Malacca Police Chief on 7 September 1970 and later the Selangor Police Chief on 6 December 1971. He was appointed the Deputy Inspector General of Police on 1 February 1973.

== Early Life & Education ==
He started receiving his formal education at the Anglo-Chinese School, Teluk Intan before being selected to attend the Malay College Kuala Kangsar, Perak, up until 1956. From 1954 until 1956, he was well known in the college for holding the Head Prefect title or commonly known as “Head Boy” for three consecutive years, which demonstrates his capability to lead and stand out among the college boys.

He later on went to attend the University of Malaya, Singapore and graduated with a Bachelor of Arts (BA) in 1959.

In 1983, he took a study leave while serving as the Inspector-General of Police (IGP) to read law in the United Kingdom. He graduated with a Bachelor of Laws (LLB) with Honours from the University of Buckingham, United Kingdom in January 1984.

His contributions to the country in terms of national security, has earned him several titles which include:

- Doctorate of Law by Universiti Kebangsaan Malaysia in 1992 and University of Buckingham in 2012
- Doctorate of Philosophy by Universiti Pertahanan Nasional Malaysia in 2011

== Police career ==
- Central Malacca Investigating Officer – April 1960
- Assistant Jasin District Police Chief, Malacca – 20 November 1960
- Assistant Officer in Charge of Criminal Investigation (South) Pahang – 2 December 1960
- Special Branch Staff Officer, Bukit Aman, Kuala Lumpur – 16 January 1962
- Selangor Special Branch Staff Officer – 8 August 1966
- Ipoh District Police Chief, Perak – 20 July 1967
- Chief of Staff (Police) of the National Operations Council – 18 May 1969
- Head of Selangor Special Branch – 20 December 1969
- Malacca Police Chief – 7 September 1970
- Selangor Police Chief – 6 December 1971
- Director of Special Branch – 31 January 1973
- Deputy Inspector General of Police – 1 February 1973
- Inspector General of Police – from 8 June 1974 to 15 January 1994

During his tenure as Inspector General of Police, he founded the elite counterterrorist unit, Special Actions Unit on 1 January 1975. He also was in command of rescue operations in the 1975 AIA building hostage crisis in August 1975. In addition, he also renamed Bluff Road Police Station to Royal Malaysia Police Headquarters, Bukit Aman on 25 March 1975. On 8 June 1976, Hanif announced all police recruits would serve in Police Field Force before being assigned to other units. This was to ensure that all young policemen would be able to tackle any emergency situation once they were equipped with jungle training. Hanif also directed all state police chiefs to review security, particularly fire prevention measures in all highrise building throughout nationwide on 28 November 1992.

== Death and burial ==
Hanif died on 20 April 2024, at the age of 85. He was buried at Bukit Kiara Muslim Cemetery in Kuala Lumpur.

== Honours ==
=== Honours of Malaysia ===
- Malaysia
  - Grand Commander of the Order of Loyalty to the Crown of Malaysia (SSM) – Tun (1993)
  - Commander of the Order of the Defender of the Realm (PMN) – Tan Sri (1976)
  - Officer of the Order of the Defender of the Realm (KMN) (1970)
  - Recipient of the Active Service Medal (PKB)
  - Recipient of the General Service Medal (PPA)
  - Recipient of the Malaysian Commemorative Medal (Silver) (PPM)
- Johor
  - Knight Grand Commander of the Order of the Crown of Johor (SPMJ) – Dato' (1980)
- Kedah
  - Knight Commander of the Order of Loyalty to Sultan Abdul Halim Mu'adzam Shah (DHMS) – Dato' Paduka (1990)
- Malacca
  - Recipient of the Commendable Service Star (BKT)
- Negeri Sembilan
  - Knight Grand Commander of the Order of Loyalty to Negeri Sembilan (SPNS) – Dato' Seri Utama (1992)
- Pahang
  - Knight Grand Companion of the Order of the Crown of Pahang (SIMP) – formerly Dato', now Dato' Indera (1981)
- Perak
  - Knight Grand Commander of the Perak Family Order of Sultan Nazrin Shah (SPSN) – Dato' Seri DiRaja (2016)
  - Grand Knight of the Azlanii Royal Family Order (DSA) – Dato' Seri (2009)
  - Knight Grand Commander of the Order of Taming Sari (SPTS) – Dato' Seri Panglima (1978)
  - Knight Grand Commander of the Order of the Perak State Crown (SPMP) – Dato' Seri (1974)
  - Recipient of the Distinguished Conduct Medal (PPT) (1969)
- Sarawak
  - Knight Commander of the Order of the Star of Hornbill Sarawak (DA) – Datuk Amar (1993)
- Selangor
  - Knight Grand Companion of the Order of Sultan Salahuddin Abdul Aziz Shah (SSSA) – Dato' Seri (1992)
  - Recipient of the Sultan Salahuddin Silver Jubilee Medal

=== Foreign Honours ===
- Indonesia
  - First Class (Utama) of the Star of Bhayangkara
- Singapore
  - Recipient of the Darjah Utama Bakti Cemerlang (DUBC) (1993)
- Thailand
  - Knight Grand Cross of the Order of the White Elephant (PCh) (1992)
  - Knight Grand Cross of the Order of the Crown of Thailand (PM) (1989)

Preceded by Abdul Rahman Hashim	Inspector-General of Police (Malaysia); 1974–1994	Succeeded by Abdul Rahim Mohd Noor
