= Abdul Manaf Hashim =

Malaysian politician

Yang Berbahagia Dato' Abdul Manaf Hashim DPMP
- عبدالمناف هاشم

Special Adviser for Menteri Besar of Perak
- Incumbent
- Assumed office 23 December 2020
- Preceded by: Position established

Member of Perak State Legislative Assembly for Pengkalan Baharu
- In office 2013–2022
- Preceded by: Hamdi Abu Bakar

Personal details
- Party: UMNO
- Other political affiliations: BN
- Occupation: Politician

Abdul Manaf bin Hashim is a Malaysian politician. He is the Member of Perak State Legislative Assembly for Pengkalan Baharu from 2013 to 2022.

== Controversies ==
On 4 December 2020, he had proposed a motion of confidence in the Perak State Legislative Assembly towards the Menteri Besar of Perak, Ahmad Faizal Azumu from Perikatan Nasional. The speaker, Mohammad Zahir Abdul Khalid had agreed to the motion. As a result, Ahmad Faizal no longer have the majority in the Perak State Legislative Assembly from Barisan Nasional and Pakatan Harapan.

On 23 December 2020, the new Menteri Besar of Perak, Saarani Mohamad has appointed him as a Special Adviser for the Menteri Besar due to his capacity of being an experienced and serving people's representative. However, Saarani denied that the appointment is due to the overthrow of Ahmad Faizal.

== Election results ==
Perak State Legislative Assembly
Year	Constituency	Candidate	Votes	Pct	Opponent(s)	Votes	Pct	Ballot cast	Majority	Turnout
2013	N36 Pengkalan Baharu	Abdul Manaf Hashim (UMNO)	8,281	58.50%	Khairuddin Abdul Malik (PAS)	5,776	40.81%	14,414	2,505	82.60%
2013	N36 Pengkalan Baharu	Abdul Manaf Hashim (UMNO)	8,281	58.50%	Ahmad Nizam Ibrahim (IND)	98	0.69%	14,414	2,505	82.60%
2018	N36 Pengkalan Baharu	Abdul Manaf Hashim (UMNO)	6,321	45.80%	Murad Abdullah (BERSATU)	4,688	34.02%	13,781	1,633	76.24%
2018	N36 Pengkalan Baharu	Abdul Manaf Hashim (UMNO)	6,321	45.80%	Zakaria Hashim (PAS)	2,781	20.18%	13,781	1,633	76.24%

== Honours ==
- Perak
  - Knight Commander of the Order of the Perak State Crown (DPMP) – Dato' (2010)
