= Kubu Gajah (state constituency) =

Political subdivision in Malaysia

Kubu Gajah (N06)
Perak constituency

State constituency
- Legislature: Perak State Legislative Assembly
MLA
Khalil Yahaya
PN
- Constituency created: 2003
- First contested: 2004
- Last contested: 2022

Demographics
- Electors (2022): 21,358

Kubu Gajah is a state constituency in Perak, Malaysia, that has been represented in the Perak State Legislative Assembly.

== Demographics ==
Ethnic breakdown of Kubu Gajah's electorate as of 2022
1. Malay (94.8%)
2. Indian (3.10%)
3. Chinese (1.60%)
4. Other ethnicities (0.55%)

== History ==
=== Polling districts ===
According to the federal gazette issued on 31 October 2022, the Kubu Gajah constituency is divided into 17 polling districts.

State constituency	Polling Districts	Code	Location
Kubu Gajah (N06）	Sungai Dendang	056/06/01	SK Sungai Dendang
Kubu Gajah (N06）	Kubu Gajah	056/06/02	SMK Kubu Gajah
Kubu Gajah (N06）	Tebing Tinggi	056/06/03	SK Tebing Tinggi
Kubu Gajah (N06）	Sungai Malau	056/06/04	SK Tebing Tinggi
Kubu Gajah (N06）	Ladang Holyrood	056/06/05	SK (RTBK) Pondok Tanjong
Kubu Gajah (N06）	Bagan Baharu	056/06/06	SK Bagan Baharu
Kubu Gajah (N06）	FELDA Ijok	056/06/07	SK Sultan Idris II
Kubu Gajah (N06）	Ulu Ijok Timor	056/06/08	SK Sungai Jernih
Kubu Gajah (N06）	Kampong Bendang Luas	056/06/09	SK Haji Wan Jaafar
Kubu Gajah (N06）	Rendang Panjang	056/06/10	SMK Rendang Panjang
Kubu Gajah (N06）	Pantai Besar	056/06/11	SK Pantai Besar
Kubu Gajah (N06）	Sungai Ara	056/06/12	SK Sungai Ara
Kubu Gajah (N06）	Kampong Gudang	056/06/13	SK Kampung Gudang
Kubu Gajah (N06）	Batu Dua Puluh	056/06/14	SK Kampung Yaman
Kubu Gajah (N06）	Jelai	056/06/15	SK Jelai
Kubu Gajah (N06）	Relang	056/06/16	SK Kampung Relang
Kubu Gajah (N06）	Kampong Ayer Hitam	056/06/17	SK Jelai

=== Representation history ===
Member of Perak State Legislative Assembly for Kubu Gajah
Assembly	No	Years	Member	Party
Constituency created from Selama and Batu Kurau
11th	N06	2004 – 2008	Mohd Jafri Mohd Yunus	BN (UMNO)
12th	N06	2008 – 2013	Raja Ahmad Zainuddin Raja Omar	BN (UMNO)
13th	N06	2013 – 2018	Ahmad Hasbullah Alias	BN (UMNO)
14th	N06	2018 – 2020	Khalil Yahaya	PAS
14th	N06	2020 – 2022	Khalil Yahaya	PN (PAS)
15th	N06	2022–present	Khalil Yahaya	PN (PAS)

== Election results ==
Perak state election, 2022
Party	Candidate	Votes	%	∆%
PN	Khalil Yahaya	9,868	59.16	▲59.16
BN	Osman Ahmad	5,546	33.25	▼8.56
PH	Mohd Nazri Din	1,188	7.12	▲7.12
PEJUANG	Fuaddin Kamaruddin	79	0.47	▲0.47
Total valid votes		17,003	100.00	
Total rejected ballots		280		
Unreturned ballots		42		
Turnout		17,325	79.61	▼1.08
Registered electors		21,358		
Majority		4,322	25.91	▲24.56
PN hold		Swing		

Perak state election, 2018
Party	Candidate	Votes	%	∆%
PAS	Khalil Yahaya	5,786	43.16	▼1.69
BN	Saliza Ahmad	5,606	41.81	▼13.34
PKR	Supri Musa	1,671	12.46	▲12.46
Total valid votes		13,063	97.43	
Total rejected ballots		293	2.19	
Unreturned ballots		51	0.38	
Turnout		13,407	80.69	▼4.31
Registered electors		16,615		
Majority		180	1.35	▼9.45
PAS gain from BN		Swing		?
Source(s) "RESULTS OF CONTESTED ELECTION AND STATEMENTS OF THE POLL AFTER THE OFFICIAL ADDITION OF VOTES".

Perak state election, 2013
Party	Candidate	Votes	%	∆%
BN	Ahmad Hasbullah Alias	5,807	55.15	▲4.75
PAS	Mohd Nazri Din	4,722	44.85	▼4.75
Total valid votes		10,529	98.18	
Total rejected ballots		170	1.59	
Unreturned ballots		25	0.23	
Turnout		10,724	85.00	▲9.00
Registered electors		12,611		
Majority		1,085	10.30	▲9.50
BN hold		Swing		
Source(s) "KEPUTUSAN PILIHAN RAYA UMUM DEWAN UNDANGAN NEGERI". Archived from the original on 2022-05-20.

Perak state election, 2008
Party	Candidate	Votes	%	∆%
BN	Raja Ahmad Zainuddin Raja Omar	4,114	50.40	▼6.88
PAS	Mohd Nazri Din	4,048	49.60	▼6.88
Total valid votes		8,162	97.76	
Total rejected ballots		174	2.08	
Unreturned ballots		13	0.16	
Turnout		8,349	76.00	▲2.70
Registered electors		10,985		
Majority		66	0.80	▼13.76
BN hold		Swing		
Source(s) "KEPUTUSAN PILIHAN RAYA UMUM DEWAN UNDANGAN NEGERI PERAK BAGI TAHUN 2008".

Perak state election, 2004
Party	Candidate	Votes	%
BN	Mohd Jafri Mohd Yunus	4,775	57.28
PAS	Mohd Nazri Din	3,372	42.72
Total valid votes		8,147	97.73
Total rejected ballots		174	2.09
Unreturned ballots		15	0.18
Turnout		8,336	73.30
Registered electors		11,373	
Majority		1,403	14.56
This was a new constituency created.
Source(s) "KEPUTUSAN PILIHAN RAYA UMUM DEWAN UNDANGAN NEGERI PERAK BAGI TAHUN 2004".
