= Khalil Yahaya =

Malaysian politician

Yang Berhormat Tuan Khalil Yahaya MLA
- خليل يحيى

Deputy Speaker of the Perak State Legislative Assembly
- In office 12 May 2020 – 19 December 2022
- Monarch: Nazrin Shah
- Menteri Besar: Ahmad Faizal Azumu (2020); Saarani Mohamad (2020–2022)
- Speaker: Mohamad Zahir Abdul Khalid
- Preceded by: Aminuddin Zulkipli
- Succeeded by: Jenny Choy Tsi Jen

Member of the Perak State Legislative Assembly for Kubu Gajah
- Incumbent
- Assumed office 9 May 2018
- Preceded by: Ahmad Hasbullah Alias (BN–UMNO)
- Majority: 180 (2018); 4,322 (2022)

Faction represented in Perak State Legislative Assembly
- 2018–2020: Malaysian Islamic Party
- 2020–: Perikatan Nasional

Personal details
- Born: Khalil bin Yahaya; 30 March 1979 (age 47) Perak, Malaysia
- Citizenship: Malaysian
- Party: Malaysian Islamic Party (PAS)
- Other political affiliations: Gagasan Sejahtera (GS) (2016–2020); Perikatan Nasional (PN) (since 2020)
- Occupation: Politician

Khalil bin Yahaya is a Malaysian politician who has served as Member of the Perak State Legislative Assembly (MLA) for Kubu Gajah since May 2018. He served as Deputy Speaker of the Perak State Legislative Assembly from May 2020 to his removal from the position in December 2022. He is a member of the Malaysian Islamic Party (PAS), a component party of the Perikatan Nasional (PN) coalition.

== Election results ==
Perlis State Legislative Assembly
Year	Constituency	Candidate	Votes	Pct	Opponent(s)	Votes	Pct	Ballots cast	Majority	Turnout
2018	N06 Kubu Gajah	Khalil Yahaya (PAS)	5,786	44.29%	Saliza Ahmad (UMNO)	5,606	42.92%	13,063	180	78.92%
2018	N06 Kubu Gajah	Khalil Yahaya (PAS)	5,786	44.29%	Mat Supri Musa (BERSATU)	1,671	12.79%	13,063	180	78.92%
2022	N06 Kubu Gajah	Khalil Yahaya (PAS)	9,868	59.16%	Osman Ahmad (UMNO)	5,546	33.25%	16,681	4,322	78.10%
2022	N06 Kubu Gajah	Khalil Yahaya (PAS)	9,868	59.16%	Mohd Nazri Din (AMANAH)	1,188	7.12%	16,681	4,322	78.10%
2022	N06 Kubu Gajah	Khalil Yahaya (PAS)	9,868	59.16%	Fuaddin Kamaruddin (PEJUANG)	79	0.47%	16,681	4,322	78.10%
