= Batu Kurau (state constituency) =

Political subdivision in Malaysia

Batu Kurau (N07)
Perak constituency

State constituency
- Legislature: Perak State Legislative Assembly
MLA
Mohd Najmuddin Elias Al-Hafiz
PN
- Constituency created: 1974
- First contested: 1974
- Last contested: 2022

Demographics
- Electors (2022): 22,022

Batu Kurau is a state constituency in Perak, Malaysia, that has been represented in the Perak State Legislative Assembly.

== Demographics ==
Ethnic breakdown of Batu Kurau's electorate as of 2022
1. Malay (88.9%)
2. Indian (7.82%)
3. Chinese (2.59%)
4. Other ethnicities (0.66%)

== History ==
=== Polling districts ===
According to the federal gazette issued on 31 October 2022, the Batu Kurau constituency is divided into 14 polling districts.

State constituency	Polling Districts	Code	Location
Batu Kurau（N07）	Ulu Sepetang	056/07/01	SK Ulu Sepetang
Batu Kurau（N07）	Sungai Pulau	056/07/02	SK Toh Sajak
Batu Kurau（N07）	Batu Kurau	056/07/03	SMK Dato Kamaruddin
Batu Kurau（N07）	Changkat Perah	056/07/04	SMK Dato Kamaruddin
Batu Kurau（N07）	Kampong Repoh	056/07/05	SK Kampung Repoh
Batu Kurau（N07）	Sungai Akar	056/07/06	SK Batu Kurau
Batu Kurau（N07）	Kampong Titi Kasai	056/07/07	SMK Kampong Perak
Batu Kurau（N07）	Changkat Lobak	056/07/08	Madrasah Diniah SA Rakyat Nurul Khairiah
Batu Kurau（N07）	Bukit Bertan	056/07/09	SMK Kampong Perak
Batu Kurau（N07）	Kampong Perak Tengah	056/07/10	SK Kampong Perak
Batu Kurau（N07）	Kampong Sempeneh	056/07/11	SK Kampong Perak
Batu Kurau（N07）	Kampong Anak Kurau	056/07/12	SK Sri Kurau
Batu Kurau（N07）	Kampong Anak Kurau	056/07/13	SK Ulu Sepetang
Batu Kurau（N07）	Taman Rakyat	056/07/14	SRA Rakyat Nurul Khairiah; Tabika KEMAS, Taman Rakyat dan Dewan Orang Ramai, Taman Rakyat

=== Representation history ===
Member of Perak State Legislative Assembly for Batu Kurau
Assembly	No	Years	Member	Party
Constituency created from Larut and Selama
4th	N04	1974 – 1978	Tajudin Ali	BN (UMNO)
5th	N04	1978 – 1982	Abdul Manan Mohd Ali	BN (UMNO)
6th	N04	1982 – 1986	Abdul Manan Mohd Ali	BN (UMNO)
7th	N04	1986 – 1990	Abdul Manan Mohd Ali	BN (UMNO)
8th	N04	1990 – 1995	Raja Ahmad Zainuddin Raja Omar	BN (UMNO)
9th	N05	1995 – 1999	Raja Ahmad Zainuddin Raja Omar	BN (UMNO)
10th	N05	1999 – 2004	Mohd Jafri Mohd Yunus	BN (UMNO)
11th	N07	2004 – 2008	Mohd Najmuddin Elias	BN (UMNO)
12th	N07	2008 – 2013	Mohd Najmuddin Elias	BN (UMNO)
13th	N07	2013 – 2018	Muhammad Amin Zakaria	BN (UMNO)
14th	N07	2018 – 2022	Muhammad Amin Zakaria	BN (UMNO)
15th	N07	2022–present	Mohd Najmuddin Elias	PN (BERSATU)

== Election results ==
Perak state election, 2022
Party	Candidate	Votes	%	∆%
PN	Mohd Najmuddin Elias Al-Hafiz	8,806	50.67	▲50.67
BN	Saliza Ahmad	5,588	32.15	▼13.86
PH	Muhamad Aiman Aizuddin Md Husin	2,669	15.36	▲15.36
PEJUANG	Zulkifli Yahya	317	1.82	▲1.82
Total valid votes		17,689	100.00	
Total rejected ballots		248		
Unreturned ballots		61		
Turnout		17,998	80.32	▼4.61
Registered electors		22,022		
Majority		3,218	18.52	▲1.30
PN gain from BN		Swing		?

Perak state election, 2018
Party	Candidate	Votes	%	∆%
BN	Muhammad Amin Zakaria	6,168	46.01	▼16.16
PAS	Shahir Hassan	3,860	28.79	▲28.79
PKR	Muhamad Aiman Aizuddin	3,051	22.76	▼15.07
Pan-Malaysian Islamic Front	Zainal Abidin Abdul Rahman	42	0.31	▲0.31
Total valid votes		13,121	97.87	
Total rejected ballots		269	2.01	
Unreturned ballots		19	0.14	
Turnout		13,406	84.93	▼1.27
Registered electors		16,355		
Majority		2,308	17.22	▼7.12
BN hold		Swing		
Source(s) "RESULTS OF CONTESTED ELECTION AND STATEMENTS OF THE POLL AFTER THE OFFICIAL ADDITION OF VOTES".

Perak state election, 2013
Party	Candidate	Votes	%	∆%
BN	Muhammad Amin Zakaria	9,789	62.17	▲1.67
PKR	Mohammad Fadzil Alias	5,955	37.83	▼1.67
Total valid votes		15,744	98.38	
Total rejected ballots		222	1.39	
Unreturned ballots		37	0.23	
Turnout		16,003	86.20	▲9.08
Registered electors		18,563		
Majority		3,834	24.34	▲3.34
BN hold		Swing		
Source(s) "KEPUTUSAN PILIHAN RAYA UMUM DEWAN UNDANGAN NEGERI". Archived from the original on 2022-10-10.

Perak state election, 2008
Party	Candidate	Votes	%	∆%
BN	Mohd Najmuddin Elias	7,023	60.50	▼4.88
PKR	Abdul Hamid Ali	4,584	39.50	▲4.88
Total valid votes		11,607	97.52	
Total rejected ballots		295	2.48	
Unreturned ballots		0	0.00	
Turnout		11,902	77.12	▲0.93
Registered electors		15,433		
Majority		2,439	21.00	▼12.65
BN hold		Swing		
Source(s) "KEPUTUSAN PILIHAN RAYA UMUM DEWAN UNDANGAN NEGERI PERAK BAGI TAHUN 2008".

Perak state election, 2004
Party	Candidate	Votes	%	∆%
BN	Mohd Najmuddin Elias	7,629	65.38	▲9.96
PKR	Mohamed Adly Kamarun	3,702	34.62	▲34.62
Total valid votes		11,331	97.11	
Total rejected ballots		298	2.55	
Unreturned ballots		39	0.33	
Turnout		11,668	76.19	▲4.17
Registered electors		15,315		
Majority		3,927	33.65	▼20.01
BN hold		Swing		
Source(s) "KEPUTUSAN PILIHAN RAYA UMUM DEWAN UNDANGAN NEGERI PERAK BAGI TAHUN 2004".

Perak state election, 1999
Party	Candidate	Votes	%	∆%
BN	Mohd Jafri Mohd Yunus	7,202	55.42	▼11.46
PAS	Saari Osman	5,429	41.78	▲13.90
Total valid votes		12,631	97.20	
Total rejected ballots		345	2.65	
Unreturned ballots		19	0.15	
Turnout		12,995	72.02	▲4.05
Registered electors		18,043		
Majority		1,773	13.64	▼26.29
BN hold		Swing		
Source(s) "KEPUTUSAN PILIHAN RAYA UMUM DEWAN UNDANGAN NEGERI PERAK BAGI TAHUN 1995".

Perak state election, 1995
Party	Candidate	Votes	%	∆%
BN	Raja Ahmad Zainuddin Raja Omar	8,245	68.48	▼2.34
PAS	Kamarudin Awang Basir	3,437	28.55	▼0.63
Independent	Mohamed Shohor Mohd Nasir	357	2.97	▲2.97
Total valid votes		12,039	97.66	
Total rejected ballots		239	1.94	
Unreturned ballots		50	0.41	
Turnout		12,328	67.97	▼4.77
Registered electors		18,138		
Majority		4,808	39.93	▼1.71
BN hold		Swing		
Source(s) "KEPUTUSAN PILIHAN RAYA UMUM DEWAN UNDANGAN NEGERI PERAK BAGI TAHUN 1990".

Perak state election, 1990
Party	Candidate	Votes	%	∆%
BN	Raja Ahmad Zainuddin Raja Omar	8,307	70.82	▼1.88
PAS	Kamarudin Awang Basir	3,422	29.18	▲1.88
Total valid votes		11,729	96.20	
Total rejected ballots		463	3.80	
Unreturned ballots		0	0.00	
Turnout		12,192	72.74	▲5.54
Registered electors		16,762		
Majority		4,885	41.64	▼3.76
BN hold		Swing		
Source(s) "KEPUTUSAN PILIHAN RAYA UMUM DEWAN UNDANGAN NEGERI PERAK BAGI TAHUN 1990".

Perak state election, 1986
Party	Candidate	Votes	%	∆%
BN	Abdul Manan Mohd Ali	7,737	72.70	▲0.58
PAS	Kamarudin Awang Basir	2,906	27.30	▼0.58
Total valid votes		10,643	100.00	
Total rejected ballots		406		
Unreturned ballots		0		
Turnout		11,049	67.20	▼7.82
Registered electors		16,441		
Majority		4,831	45.39	▲1.15
BN hold		Swing		
Source(s) "KEPUTUSAN PILIHAN RAYA UMUM DEWAN UNDANGAN NEGERI PERAK BAGI TAHUN 1986".

Perak state election, 1982
Party	Candidate	Votes	%	∆%
BN	Abdul Manan Mohd. Ali	7,279	72.12	▲1.20
PAS	Hassan Talib	2,814	27.88	▼0.04
Total valid votes		10,093	100.00	
Total rejected ballots		246		
Unreturned ballots		0		
Turnout		10,339	75.02	▼3.32
Registered electors		13,781		
Majority		4,465	44.24	▲1.24
BN hold		Swing		

Perak state election, 1978
Party	Candidate	Votes	%	∆%
BN	Abdul Manan Mohd. Ali	6,416	70.92	▼12.05
PAS	Puteh Abdul Latiff	2,526	27.92	▲27.92
DAP	Che Rose Abdullah	105	1.16	▲1.16
Total valid votes		9,047	100.00	
Total rejected ballots		335		
Unreturned ballots		0		
Turnout		9,382	78.35	▲2.09
Registered electors		11,975		
Majority		3,890	43.00	▼22.93
BN hold		Swing		

Perak state election, 1974
Party	Candidate	Votes	%
BN	Tajudin Ali	6,735	82.96
KITA	Abdul Rahman Lembut	1,383	17.04
Total valid votes		8,118	100.00
Total rejected ballots		466	
Unreturned ballots		0	
Turnout		8,584	76.25
Registered electors		11,257	
Majority		5,352	65.93
This was a new constituency created.
