= Mohd Bakri Omar =

Former Inspector General of Police

Yang Berbahagia Tan Sri Dato' Seri Panglima Mohd Bakri Omar PMN SPTS SJMK SPDK SSAP SIMP PNBS DHMS PGDK JMN KMN PSPNB
- محمد بکري عمر

7th Inspector-General of Police (Malaysia)
- In office 5 November 2003 – 11 September 2006
- Monarch: Sirajuddin
- Minister: Abdullah Ahmad Badawi; Azmi Khalid; Mohd Radzi Sheikh Ahmad
- Preceded by: Norian Mai
- Succeeded by: Musa Hassan

Personal details
- Born: 10 September 1948 Manjung, Perak, Federation of Malaya
- Died: 10 November 2014 (aged 66) National Cancer Institute
- Resting place: Bukit Kiara Muslim Cemetery
- Spouse: Puan Sri Maizura Mohd Yusof

Mohd Bakri bin Omar (10 September 1948 – 10 November 2014) was an Inspector General of Police who served from 5 November 2003 to 11 September 2006.

Born in Manjung, Perak, Bakri began his service as an Assistant Superintendent Cadet on 1 January 1971, and like most other officers, has undergone basic police training at Police Training Center (PULAPOL). He became Kedah Police Chief in 1996 and Kuala Lumpur Police Chief in 1997. Then, in 2002, he was appointed Deputy Inspector General of Police. When Tan Sri Norian Mai retired on 5 November 2003, Bakri was appointed his replacement.

== Police career ==
- Mersing District Police Chief (1972–1973)
- Balik Pulau District Police Chief, Penang (1974–1977)
- Petaling Jaya District Police Chief (1987–1989)
- Deputy Commander of College of Senior Police Officers, Kuala Kubu Bahru (1984–1986)
- Head of Kuala Lumpur Criminal Investigation Department (1989–1994)
- Sabah Police Commissioner (1994)
- Kedah Police Chief (1996–1997)
- Kuala Lumpur Police Chief (1997–1998)
- Director General of National Drug Agency (1999)
- Director of Management Department (1999–2002)
- Deputy Inspector General of Police (2002)
- Inspector General of Police (2003–2006)

== Death ==
Bakri died on 10 November 2014 at the National Cancer Institute due to cancer.

== Honours ==
- Malaysia
  - Commander of the Order of the Defender of the Realm (PMN) – Tan Sri (2004)
  - Companion of the Order of the Defender of the Realm (JMN) (1996)
  - Officer of the Order of the Defender of the Realm (KMN) (1985)
- Royal Malaysia Police
  - Loyal Commander of the Most Gallant Police Order (PSPP) (1997)
- Kedah
  - Knight Commander of the Order of Loyalty to Sultan Abdul Halim Mu'adzam Shah (DHMS) – Dato' Paduka (2005)
- Kelantan
  - Knight Grand Commander of the Order of the Life of the Crown of Kelantan (SJMK) – Dato' (2005)
- Pahang
  - Knight Grand Companion of the Order of Sultan Ahmad Shah of Pahang (SSAP) – Dato' Sri (2004)
  - Knight Grand Companion of the Order of the Crown of Pahang (SIMP) – formerly Dato', now Dato' Indera (2003)
- Perak
  - Knight Grand Commander of the Order of Taming Sari (SPTS) – Dato' Seri Panglima (2002)
- Sabah
  - Grand Commander of the Order of Kinabalu (SPDK) – Datuk Seri Panglima (2005)
  - Commander of the Order of Kinabalu (PGDK) – Datuk (1994)
- Sarawak
  - Knight Commander of the Most Exalted Order of the Star of Sarawak (PNBS) – Dato Sri (2006)

=== Foreign honours ===
- Brunei
  - First Class of the Order of Pahlawan Negara Brunei (PSPNB) – Dato Seri Pahlawan (2005)
