= Lau Pak Khuan =

Malaysian politician (1894–1971)

Lau Pak Khuan (simplified Chinese: 刘伯群; traditional Chinese: 劉伯群; pinyin: Liú Bóqún; Jyutping: Lau4 Baak3 Kwan4; 1894 – 1971) was a major Chinese political and community leader in Malaysia.

Born in China, Lau was 17 when he came to Malaya on board a Chinese junk in search of a better life. Upon arrival, he saw and experienced the hardship of his countrymen. He made a promise to himself that if he ever made it, he would do all he could for their welfare. Being a Hakka, Lau had to work as a labourer, and his first job was as a tin-mine pushcart boy. He was eventually made a supervisor after years of hard work, and ended up managing 20 of his own tin mines.

A former Kuomintang leader, he was a personal friend of Sun Yat-sen and Chiang Kai-shek. A founding member of Malaysian Chinese Association (MCA), he split ranks with the mainstream and left the party in 1956 over major differences in defending Chinese rights. He was noted for leading the fight for Chinese equal citizenship rights and official language status during the drafting of the Malaysian Constitution after Malaysia gained her independence, although it was not successful. The mainstream of the MCA was not in support of this.

Lau was awarded the title Officer of the Order of the British Empire by King George V for public service. He was awarded the Datuk title in 1963 and Datuk Seri three years later by then Sultan of Perak, Sultan Idris Shah. He was the first Chinese to be conferred the Datuk Seri title.

A street was named after him in Ipoh Garden, Ipoh, Perak.

He served as President of Chinese Chamber of Commerce for 33 years, Perak Chinese Assembly Hall for a similar period, Perak Kwantung Association for 30 years and Perak Chinese Mining Association for 25 years. He was president of the associations for so many years as no one wanted to challenge him. They had such faith in him to lead the community.

He died in 1971, leaving behind nine children – three girls and six boys. He was an extraordinary man who preferred to remain anonymous when he donated to charities. He believed everything he had was from the people, and this was why he worked so hard to give something back.
