= Order of precedence in Perak =

Relative preeminence of officials for ceremonial purposes

The Perak order of precedence is a nominal and symbolic hierarchy of important positions within the state of Perak. It has no legal standing but is used to dictate ceremonial protocol at events of a state nature.

== Order of precedence ==
Order of precedence in Perak is as follows:

No.	Description
1	His Royal Highness The Sultan
2	Her Royal Highness The Raja Permaisuri
3	The Raja Muda
4	The Raja Puan Besar
5	The Raja di Hilir
6	The Raja Puan Muda
7	Raja Permaisuri Tuanku Bainun (The Sultan's Mother)
8	The Sultan's Widow
8A	The Prime Minister
8B	The Deputy Prime Minister
9	The Menteri Besar
10	The Raja Kechil Besar
11	The Raja Kechil Sulong
12	The Raja Kechil Tengah
13	The Raja Kechil Bongsu
14	Heirs of State: Widows of the Raja Muda; Widows of the Raja di Hilir; Widows of the Raja Bendahara; The Raja Puan Mahkota; Other heirs
15	The Judges
16	The Speaker of the Legislative Assembly
16A	Federal Ministers
17	State Secretary; State Legal Adviser; State Financial Officer; Members of the Executive Council
18	The Orang Besar Empat
19	The Orang Besar Delapan
20	Members of the Royal Court
21	Mayor of Ipoh
22	Grand Commanders of the Most Illustrious Order of Cura Si Manja Kini (SPCM); Grand Commanders of the Most Valliant Order of Taming Sari (SPTS); Grand Commanders of the Most Illustrious Order of the Perak State Crown (SPMP)
23	Federal Deputy Ministers
24	Parliamentary Secretaries
25	Members of the Legislative Assembly
26	Members of the House of Representatives representing the State
27	Senators
28	Commanders of the Most Illustrious Order of Cura Si Manja Kini (DPCM); Commanders of the Most Valliant Order of Taming Sari (DPTM); Commanders of the Most Illustrious Order of the Perak State Crown (DPMP)
29	Chairperson of the State Islamic and Malay Affairs Council
30	State Mufti
31	State Chief Qadhi
32	Members of the State Islamic and Malay Affairs Council
33	Members of the State Public Service Commission
34	Head of Federal and State Government Departments in the State
35	Companions of the Most Illustrious Order of Cura Si Manja Kini (PCM); Companions of the Most Valliant Order of Taming Sari (PTM); Companions of the Most Illustrious Order of the Perak State Crown (PMP)
36	Orang Besar Enam Belas
37	Orang Besar Tiga Puluh Dua
38	Toh Muda Orang Besar Negeri
39	Qadhis
40	Justices of the Peace
41	Headmen
42	Members of the State Medals

== See also ==
- List of post-nominal letters (Perak)
