= List of post-nominal letters (Perak) =

Honorific order of the Sultanate of Perak

This is a list of post-nominal letters used in Perak. The order in which they follow an individual's name is the same as the order of precedence for the wearing of order insignias, decorations, and medals. When applicable, non-hereditary titles are indicated.

Grades		Post-nominal	Title	Wive's title	Ribbon
The Most Esteemed Royal Family Order of Perak - Darjah Kerabat Diraja Perak Yang Amat Dihormati
Member	Darjah Kerabat Diraja Perak Yang Amat Dihormati	D.K.	--	--	
The Most Esteemed Perak Family Order of Sultan Azlan Shah - Darjah Kerabat Sri Paduka Sultan Azlan Shah Perak Yang Amat Dihormati
Superior class	Darjah Kerabat Sultan Azlan	D.K.S.A.	--	--	
Ordinary class	Dato' Seri Paduka Sultan Azlan Shah Perak Yang Amat Dimulia	S.P.S.A.	Dato' Seri Diraja	Datin Seri Diraja	
The Most Esteemed Azlanii Royal Family Order - Darjah Yang Teramat Mulia Darjah Kerabat Azlanii
Member First Class	Darjah Kerabat Azlanii Pertama	D.K.A. I	--	--	(current)
Member First Class	Darjah Kerabat Azlanii Pertama	D.K.A. I	--	--	(previous)
Member Second Class	Darjah Kerabat Azlanii Kedua	D.K.A. II	--	--	
Grand Knight	Darjah Kebesaran Dato' Seri Azlanii	D.S.A.	Dato' Seri	Datin Seri	
The Most Esteemed Perak Family Order of Sultan Nazrin Shah - Darjah Kerabat Sri Paduka Sultan Nazrin Shah Perak Yang Amat Dihormati
Ordinary class	Dato' Seri Paduka Sultan Nazrin Shah	S.P.S.N.	Dato' Seri Diraja	Datin Seri Diraja	
The Most Illustrious Order of Cura Si Manja Kini (the Perak Sword of State) - Darjah Kebesaran Negeri Perak Yang Amat Mulia Cura Si Manja Kini
Grand Knight	Dato' Seri Paduka Cura Si Manja Kini	S.P.C.M.	Dato' Seri	Datin Seri	
Knight	Dato' Paduka Cura Si Manja Kini	D.P.C.M.	Dato'	Datin	
Commander	Paduka Cura Si Manja Kini	P.C.M.	--	--	
Member	Ahli Cura Si Manja Kini	A.C.M.	--	--	
The Most Valliant Order of Taming Sari (the Perak State Kris) - Darjah Kebesaran Taming Sari Negeri Perak Yang Amat Perkasa
Knight Grand Commander	Dato' Seri Panglima Taming Sari	S.P.T.S.	Dato' Seri Panglima	Datin Seri Panglima	
Knight Commander	Dato' Pahlawan Taming Sari	D.P.T.S.	Dato' Pahlawan	Datin Pahlawan	
Commander	Pirwira (Paduka) Taming Sari	P.T.S.	--	--	
	Hulubalang Taming Sari	H.T.S.	--	--	
Officer	Kshatriya Taming Sari	K.T.S.	--	--	
Member	Perajurit (Ahli) Taming Sari	A.T.S.	--	--	
The Most Illustrious Order of the Perak State Crown - Darjah Kebesaran Mahkota Negeri Perak Yang Amat Mulia
Knight Grand Commander	Dato' Seri Paduka Mahkota Perak	S.P.M.P.	Dato' Seri	Datin Seri	
Knight Commander	Dato' Paduka Mahkota Perak	D.P.M.P.	Dato'	Datin	
Commander	Paduka Mahkota Perak	P.M.P.	--	--	
Member	Ahli Mahkota Perak	A.M.P.	--	--	
Justice of the Peace - Tauliah Jaksa Pendamai
	Tauliah Jaksa Pendamai	J.P.	--	--	
Conspicuous Gallantry Medal - Pingat Keberanian Handal
Star	Pingat Keberanian Handal	P.K.H.	--	--	
Distinguished Conduct Medal - Pingat Pekerti Terpilih
Bronze Medal	Pingat Pekerti Terpilih	P.P.T.	--	--	
Meritorious Service Medal - Pingat Jasa Kebaktian
Bronze Medal	Pingat Jasa Kebaktian	P.J.K.	--	--	
Long Service Medal - Pingat Lama Perkhidmatan
Bronze Medal	Pingat Lama Perkhidmatan	P.L.P.	--	--	

== See also ==
- Orders, decorations, and medals of Perak
- Order of precedence in Perak
