= List of Malay Film Productions films =

The Malay Film Productions (MFP), also known as the Shaw Studio, is a former film studio located on Jalan Ampas in Balestier, Singapore. The studio operated from 1947 to 1969 with more than 150 movies produced, and was a major contributor to the Golden Age of Malay Cinema. Many of the films are critically acclaimed, a significant number of which involved P. Ramlee as actor, director, writer or composer.

The following is an incomplete list of films produced by MFP (1947–1969). Also included are early Malay films (1937–1941) produced under the Shaw Brothers banner before they formed MFP. A few Malay films were shot in Hong Kong after the Jalan Ampas studio in Singapore closed in 1967.

No.	Original title	Year	Director	Cast
1	A-Go-Go '67	1967	Omar Rojik	Aziz Jaafar, Noor Azizah, Norma Zainal, Kuswadinata, S. Shamsuddin, Ibrahim Pendek
2	Abu Hassan Penchuri	1955	B.N. Rao	P. Ramlee, Mariam Baharum, Ahmad C, Nordin Ahmad, Daeng Idris, Malek Sutan Muda
3	Adek Ku	1956	B.N. Rao	Ahmad Mahmud, Rosnani Jamil, Saloma, Haji Mahadi, Siti Tanjung Perak, Malik Sutan Muda, Omar Suwita, Ahmad C
4	Aksi Kuching	1966	Omar Rojik	Aziz Sattar, Zaiton Abdullah, Normadiah, M. Zain, S. Shamsuddin, Ahmad Daud
5	Ali Baba Bujang Lapok	1961	P. Ramlee	P. Ramlee, Aziz Sattar, Normadiah, S. Shamsuddin, K. Fatimah, Ibrahim Pendek, M. Zain, Leng Hussein
6	Alladin	1952	B. S. Rajhans	Ali Rahman, Mariam Rahim, Jaafar Shah
7	Aloha	1952	B. S. Rajhans	Osman Gumanti, Mariam Rahim, P. Ramlee, A.R Tompel, S.Shamsuddin
8	Anak Buloh Betong	1966	S. Kadarisman	Aziz Jaafar, Saadiah, Ahmad Mahmud, Rosnani, Normadiah, Haji Mahadi
9	Anak-ku Sazali	1956	Phani Majumdar	P. Ramlee, Zaiton, Nordin Ahmad, Rosnani
10	Anak Pontianak	1958	Ramon A. Estella	Jins Shamsuddin, Hashimah Yon, Dayang Sofia, S. Kadarisman
11	Anjoran Nasib	1952	B. S. Rajhans	P. Ramlee, Mariam, Harun Omar, D. Harris, Saadiah, R. Azmi, Omar Rojik, Musalmah, Marliah, Saamah
12	Antara Dua Darjat	1960	P. Ramlee	P. Ramlee, Saadiah, S. Kadarisman
13	Antara Senyum dan Tangis	1952	L. Krishnan	P. Ramlee, Rokiah Jaafar, Musalmah, Siti Tanjong Perak, Harun Omar
14	Arjuna	1953	V. Girimaji	Ahmad Mahmud, Rokiah Jaafar, Aziz Sattar, Aini Hayati, D. Harris, Mustarjo, Malik Sutan Muda, Raja Hamidah
15	Ayer Mata	1953	K. M. Basker	Ahmad Mahmud, Rosnani, Siti Tanjung Perak, Habibah
16	Azimat	1958	Rolf Bayer	Pancho Magalona, Saloma, Tita Doran, Ahmad Mahmud, Jins Shamsuddin, Salleh Kamil
17	Bakti	1950	L. Krishnan	S. Roomai Noor, Kasma Booty, P. Ramlee, Siput Sarawak
18	Bapa Saya	1961	B. S. Rajhans	A. R. Tompel, Neng Yatimah, Osman Gumanti, Rokiah Jaafar
19	Batu Belah Batu Bertangkup	1958	Jamil Sulong	Aziz Jaafar, Zaiton, Neng Yatimah, Salleh Kamil, S. Kadarisman, Haji Mahadi, Rahmah Rahmat, Bat Latif, Hasnah Hassan
20	Batu Durhaka	1962	Omar Rojik	Jins Shamsuddin, Aziz Jaafar, Sarimah, S. Kadarisman, Rahmah Rahmat, Seri Dewi, Malik Sutan Muda
21	Belantara	1957	S. Ramanathan	Nordin Ahmad, Normadiah, Salleh Kamil, S. Shamsuddin, D. Idris, A. Rahman, Musalmah
22	Berdosa	1951	S. Ramanathan	S. Roomai Noor, Rokiah Jaafar, Siput Sarawak, Yem
23	Bermadu (Note: Films released under Shaw Brothers)	1940	Miss Yen, Wan Hai Ling	Aman Belon, Yem, Tina, Habsah
24	BernodaBernoda	1956	S. Ramanathan	Yusof Latiff, Normadiah, Latifah Omar, S. Kadarisman, Nordin Ahmad, Siti Tanjung Perak
25	Bidasari	1965	Jamil Sulong	Jins Shamsuddin, Sarimah, S. Kadarisman, Malik Sutan Muda, Habsah, Saamah, S. Shamsuddin, H. M. Bosra, Md. Rafee, Zahara Ahmad
26	Budi dan Dosa	1963	Jamil Sulong	Jins Shamsuddin, Zaiton, Hashimah Yon, Haji Mahadi, Zainon Fiji, Kuswadinata
27	Bujang Lapok	1957	P. Ramlee	P. Ramlee, Normadiah, S. Shamssudin, Aziz Sattar, Zaiton, Dayang Sofia
28	Chemburu	1953	S. Ramanathan	Yusof Latiff, Rosnani, Mariani, Siti Tanjong Perak, Haji Mahadi
29	Chempaka	1948	B. S. Rajhans	Salleh Ghani, Kasma Booty, Yem, Mariani, Suhara Effendi, Jaafar Wiryo
30	Chinta	1948	B. S. Rajhans	S. Roomai Noor, Siput Sarawak, P. Ramlee
31	Dahaga	1966	Omar Rojik	Aziz Jaafar, Sarimah, Norma Zainal, S. Shamsuddin, Malik Sutan Muda
32	Dandan Setia	1959	Dhiresh Ghosh	Jins Shamsuddin, Saadiah, Aziz Jaafar, Normadiah, Rahmah Rahmat
33	Darah Muda	1963	Jamil Sulong	Jins Shamsuddin, Sarimah, Salleh Kamil, Mariani, S. Kadarisman
34	Dayang Senandong	1965	Jamil Sulong	Ahmad Mahmud, Sarimah, Haji Mahadi, Salleh Kamil, Habsah, Malek Sutan Muda, Ibrahim Pendek
35	Derita	1952	L. Krishnan	Ali Rahman, Neng Yatimah, Mariam, A. Rahim
36	Dewi Murni	1950	B. S. Rajhans	Osman Gumanti, Kasma Booty, D. Harris, A. R. Tompel
37	Doktor	1958	Phani Majumdar	Aziz Jaafar, Zaiton, S. Kadarisman, Haji Mahadi
38	Dupa Cendana	1964	Ramon A. Estella	Ahmad Mahmud, Saadiah, Mariani, Aziz Jaafar, S. Kadarisman
39	Empat Isteri	1955	B. S. Rajhans	D. Idris, Normadiah, Saloma, Latifah Omar, Mariani, A. Rahim, Salleh Kamil
40	Gadis Peladang	1952	B. S. Rajhans	Yusof Latiff, Neng Yatimah, Maria Menado, D. Harris, Omar Rojik, Salleh Kamil, Marliah
41	Gagak Hitam	1937		
42	Gelora Hidup	1954	B.N. Rao	Yusof Latiff, Rosnani, Muslamah, S. Kadarismah, Nordin Ahmad
43	Gerak Kilat	1966	Jamil Sulong	Jins Shamsuddin, Sarimah, Salleh Kamil, Rahmah Rahmat, Ibrahim Bachik, Shariff Dol, Omar Suwita
44	Gergasi	1958	Dhiresh Ghosh	Aziz Jaafar, Hashimah Yon, Rokiah Jaafar, Haji Mahadi, Aziz Sattar
45	Gerhana	1962	Jamil Sulong	Ahmad Mahmud, Zaiton, Haji Mahadi, Rahmah Rahmat, Bat Latif, Saamah, Habsah
46	Hanchor Hati	1941	Hou Yao, Wan Hoi Ling	Ahmad C. B., Rose Philipina, Habsah, Yem, Tina
47	Hang Tuah	1956	Phani Majumdar	P Ramlee, Saadiah, Ahmad Mahmud, Haji Mahadi, Daeng Idris, Zaiton, Yusof Latiff
48	Hantu Jerangkong	1957		Aziz Jaffar, S. Kadarisman
49	Hantu Kubor	1958		Aziz Jaffar, Hashimah Yon
50	Hati Iblis	1953		
51	Hujan Panas	1953	B.N. Rao	P. Ramlee, Siput Sarawak
52	Ibu	1953	S. Ramanathan	P. Ramlee, Neng Yatimah, Aini Hayati, Rosnani Jamil, Haji Mahadi, Nordin Ahmad, Salleh Kamil, Ahmad Jaafar
53	Ibu Mertua-ku	1962	P. Ramlee	P. Ramlee, Sarimah, Ahmad Mahmud, Zaiton, Mak Dara, Ahmad Nisfu
54	Ibu Tiri	1941	Hou Yao, Wan Hoi Ling	
55	Iman	1954	K.R.S. Sastry	Saadiah, Ahmad Mahmud, Haji Mahadi
56	Indera Bangsawan	1961	Dhiresh Ghosh	Jins Shamsuddin, Kuswadinata, Saadiah, Sarimah, Haji Mahadi
57	Insan	1955		
58	Isi Neraka	1960	Jamil Sulong	
59	Istana Impian	1953		
60	Jebak Maut	1967	Jamil Sulong	Ahmad Mahmood, Sarimah, Aziz Jaafar
61	Jefri Zain - Gerak Kilat	1966	Jamil Sulong	Jins Shamsuddin
62	Jiwa Lara	1958		
63	Jula Juli Bintang Tiga	1937? (Note: Not known if film was released)		
64	Juwita	1951	S. Ramanathan	P. Ramlee, Kasma Booty, A. Rahim, Daeng Harris, Salmah Ahmad
65	Kacha Permata	1966	Jamil Sulong	Jins Shamsudin
66	Kaki Kuda	1958		
67	Kaseh Sayang	1957	Phani Majumdar	
68	Kaseh Tanpa Sayang	1963	Omar Rojik	Aziz Jaffar, Ahmad C
69	Kechewa	1954	S. Ramanathan	
70	Kembali Sa-orang	1957	TC Santos	
71	Kembar	1950		
72	Kipas Hikmat	1955		
73	Labu Labi	1961	P. Ramlee	P. Ramlee, M. Zain, Udo Omar, Mariani
74	Lampong Karam	1967	S. Kadarisman	
75	Lela Manja	1960	Jamil Sulong	Aziz Jaffar, Normadiah, Jins Shamsudin, Saleh Kamil, Shariff Dol, Bad Latiff, Habibah
76	Lubalang Daik	1958		Jins Shamsudin
77	Mambang Moden	1964		
78	Madu Tiga	1964	P. Ramlee	P. Ramlee, Sarimah, Ahmad Nisfu
79	Mas Merah	1961		
80	Masyarakat Pinchang	1958		
81	Mata Hantu	1942	Hou Yao, Wan Hoi Ling	
82	Matahari	1958	Ramon A. Estella	Maria Menado, Ahmad Mahmud, Jins Shamsudin, Salleh Kamil, Omar Rojik
83	Megat Terawis	1958	S. Kadarisman	Jins Shamsuddin, S. Kadarisman, Ahmad Mahmud, Salleh Kamil, Kemat Hassan, Rahmah Rahmat
84	Menyerah	1956		
85	Mogok	1957	K. M. Basker	Salleh Kamil, Omar Rojik
86	Musang Berjanggut	1959	P. Ramlee	P. Ramlee, Saadiah, Ahmad Nisfu
87	Mutiara	1940	Hou Yao, Wan Hoi Ling	Haron, Tina
88	Nasib Si Labu Labi	1963	P. Ramlee	P. Ramlee, M.Zain, Udo Omar, S. Shamsuddin, Ahmad Nisfu
89	Nujum Pa' Belalang	1959	P. Ramlee	P. Ramlee, Bad Latiff, Hashimah Yon, Ahmad Nisfu, Aziz Sattar, S. Shamsuddin, Shariff Dol
90	Neracha	1963	Dhiresh Ghosh	Jins Shamsuddin, Sarimah, Murni Sarawak
91	Nora Zain: Ajen wanita 001	1967	Lo Wei	Nordin Arshad, Aziz Jaafar, Saadiah
92	Norlela	1962		
93	Panji Semerang	1961	Omar Rojik	Saadiah, Aziz Jaafar, Normadiah, S. Kadarisman
94	Pancha Delima	1957	P. Ramlee	Jins Shamsuddin, Hashimah Yon, Udo Omar, Aini Hayati
95	Panggilan Pulau	1954	S. Ramanathan	P. Ramlee, Normadiah, Nordin Ahmad
96	Pembalasan	1950	L. Krishnan	S. Roomai Noor, Siput Sarawak, Rokiah Jaafar
97	Penarek Becha	1955	P Ramlee	P.Ramlee, Saamah, Salleh Kamil, Salleh Kamil
98	Penchuri	1956		
99	Pendekar Bujang Lapok	1959	P. Ramlee	P. Ramlee, S. Shamsuddin, Aziz Sattar
100	Perjodohan	1954	B.N. Rao	
101	Permata Di Perlimbahan	1952	Haji Mahadi	Nordin Ahmad, Maria Menado, Salmah Ibrahim
102	Pileh Menantu	1963	Omar Rojik	M. Zain, Aziz Sattar, Sarimah, Salmah Ibrahim, Ahmad Nisfu, Udo Omar, Habsah
103	Pusaka Pontianak	1965	Ramon A. Estella	Maria Menado
104	Putera Bertopeng	1957	L. Krishnan	Latifah Omar, Normadiah, Ahmad Mahmud, Aziz Sattar
105	Putera Sangkar Maut	1960	Jamil Sulong	Jins Shamsuddin, Saadiah
106	Puteri Gunong Banang	1959	Dhiresh Ghosh	S. Kadarisman, Ahmad Mahmud, Kemat Hassan, Salleh Kamil, Sri Dewi, Hashimah Yon
107	Putus Harapan	1953	B.N. Rao	
108	Raja Bersiong	1968	Jamil Sulong	
109	Raja Laksamana Bentan	1959	Jamil Sulong	
110	Rayuan Sukma	1951		P. Ramlee, S. Roomai Noor
111	Ribut	1956	K. M. Basker	Ahmad Mahmud, Rosnani, Saadiah, Haji Mahadi
112	Roh Membela	1955	B.N. Rao	
113	Rumah Panjang	1957	Phani Majumdar	
114	Saudagar Minyak Urat	1959	Ramon A. Estella	S. Kadarisman, Normadiah, Aziz Sattar, S. Shamsuddin, Aini Jasmin, Leng Hussain
115	Seniman Bujang Lapok	1961	P. Ramlee	P. Ramlee, S. Shamsuddin, Aziz Sattar, Saloma, Zaiton
116	Sengsara	1953		
117	Sergeant Hassan	1958	Lamberto Avellana, P. Ramlee	P. Ramlee, Saadiah, Salleh Kamil, Jins Shamsuddin, Omar Rojik
118	Si Tanggang	1961	Jamil Sulong	Jins Shamsuddin, Sarimah, Normadiah, A. Rahim
119	Siapa Besar	1964	Omar Rojik	Aziz Sattar, Udo Omar, Zaiton, Noormadiah, Habsah
120	Siapa Salah	1953	B.N. Rao	
121	Singapura Dilanggar Todak	1962	Omar Rojik	Shariff Dol, S. Kadarisman, Kemat Hassan, Kuswadinata, Hashimah Yon
122	Singapura Di Waktu Malam	1947	B. S. Rajhans	Siput Sarawak, Bachtiar Effendi
123	Siti Muslihat	1962	Dhiresh Ghosh	Ahmad Mahmud, Saadiah, Shariff Dol
124	Sri Andalas	1966	S Kadarisman	Ed Osmera
125	Sumpah Wanita	1960	Omar Rojik	Jins Shamsudin
126	Tas Tangan Wanita	1952	L. Krishnan	Osman Gumanti, M. Amin, Rokiah Jaafar, A. Rahim
127	Taufan	1957	T. C. Santos	Ahmad Mahmud, Salleh Kamil, Zaiton, Mariani, Ibrahim Pendek, Aziz Sattar
128	Terang Bulan Di Malaya	1941	Hou Yao, Wan Hoi Ling	
129	Tiga Abdul	1964	P. Ramlee	P. Ramlee, Sarimah, Ahmad Nisfu
130	Tiga Kekasih	1943	Hou Yao, Wan Hoi Ling	
131	Topeng Hitam	1937		
132	Topeng Saitan	1941	Hou Yao, Wan Hoi Ling	
133	Yatim Piatu	1952	B. S. Rajhans	Saadiah, Rokiah Jaafar, Harun Salleh, Yusof Latiff
