= List of Malaysian films of the 1960s =

This is a list of films produced in the Federation of Malaya (including Colony of Singapore) and Malaysia ordered by year of release in the 1960s. The film produced in Singapore after 1965 is not included in the list, and being considered to the separate page (List of Singaporean films).

For an alphabetical listing of Malaysian films, see Category:Malaysian films.

Title	Director	Cast	Genre	Notes
1960
Antara Dua Darjat (Between Two Classes)	P. Ramlee	P. Ramlee, Saadiah, S. Kadarisman, S. Shamsuddin, Yusof Latiff, Ahmad Nisfu, Kuswadinata, Rahimah Alias, Mariam, Rahmah Rahmat, Kemat Hassan, Ainon Fiji, M. Rafee, Ali Fiji, Aini Jasmin, Mustarjo, Kassim Masdor, S. Sudarmaji	Drama	Malay Film Productions
Che Mamat Parang Tumpol	S. Roomai Noor	Wahid Satay, Latifah Omar, M. Amin, Siti Tanjung Perak	Comedy	Cathay-Keris Film; Entered into the 1961 Asia Pacific Film Festival
Hantu Rimau	L. Krishnan, B. N. Rao, S. Roomai Noor	S. Roomai Noor, Mary Lim, Siput Sarawak, Yem, Safinah, Puteh Lawak, Aman Belon, Mahmud June, Tyrconnel Fay, Darn Singh		Cathay-Keris Film
Isi Neraka	Jamil Sulong	Ahmad Mahmud, Saadiah, Salleh Kamil, Habsah, Haji Mahadi, S. Kadarisman, Rahmah Rahmat, A. Rahim, Shariff Dol	Drama	Malay Film Productions
Lela Manja	Jamil Sulong	Ahmad Mahmud, Zaiton, Jins Shamsuddin, Aziz Sattar, Rosnani Jamil, Normadiah, A. Rahim, Haji Mahadi, Bat Latiff, Habibah Harun		Malay Film Productions; Entered into the 1960 Asia Pacific Film Festival
Lion City	Yi Sui	Yi Sui, Wu Zi		Cathay-Keris Film; First Chinese language made in Malaya; Mandarin-language film
Megat Terawis	Dhiresh Ghosh	Ahmad Mahmud, Jins Shamsuddin, Hashimah Yon, Normadiah, Haji Mahadi, A. Rahim, S. Kadarisman, Kemat Hassan, Rahmah Rahmat, Shariff Dol		Malay Film Productions; Based on Megat Terawis
Noor Islam	K. M. Basker	Nordin Ahmad, Salmah Ahmad, Siput Sarawak, Mahmud June, Shariff Medan	Drama	Cathay-Keris Film
Pa' Pandir Moden	J. Cabin Yoo	Puteh Lawak, S. Roomai Noor, Roseyatimah, Wahid Satay, Mat Sentol	Comedy / Family	Cathay-Keris Film
Pertarongan	Omar Rojik	Aziz Jaafar, Zaiton, Jins Shamsuddin, Normadiah, S. Kadarisman, Salleh Kamil	Action	Malay Film Productions
Putera Sangkar Maut	Dhiresh Ghosh	Aziz Jaafar, Saadiah, Zaiton, Jins Shamsuddin, A. Rahim, Saamah, Rahmah Rahmat, Shariff Dol, M. Rafee		Malay Film Productions
Sumpah Wanita	Omar Rojik	Aziz Jaafar, Hashimah Yon, Jins Shamsuddin, Normadiah, Aziz Sattar, M. Zain, HM Busra	Drama	Malay Film Productions
Tunang Pa' Dukun	S. Roomai Noor	Abdullah Chik, Roseyatimah, Mahmud June	Comedy / Romance	Cathay-Keris Film
1961
Abu Nawas	A. R. Tompel	A. R. Tompel, Jah Ismail, Yusof Bujang, Fatimah Mohamed	Comedy	Merdeka Film Productions
Ali Baba Bujang Lapok (Ali Baba in Burlesque)	P. Ramlee	P. Ramlee, S. Shamsuddin, Aziz Sattar, Normadiah, K. Fatimah, Leng Husain, Ibrahim Pendek, Sarimah, A. Rahim, Shariff Dol, Kemat Hassan, M. Rafee, HM Bosra, M. Zain, Nyong Ismail, Ali Fiji, Zaiton, S. Kadarisman, Mohd Hamid, Hashim Saleh, Ibrahim Hassan, Mustarjo, Saamah	Comedy	Malay Film Productions; Based on Ali Baba; Preceded by Bujang Lapok (1957) and Pendekar Bujang Lapok (1958)
Gado-Gado	S. Roomai Noor	Wahid Satay, Fatimah Ahmad	Comedy	Cathay-Keris Film
Hang Jebat	Hussein Haniff	Nordin Ahmad, M. Amin, Latifah Omar, Mahmud June, Rosnani Jamil, Abdullah Sani, Siput Sarawak	Drama / Action / Political	Cathay-Keris Film; Entered into the 1962 Asia Pacific Film Festival; Screened at the 2002 Hong Kong International Film Festival; Based on Hang Jebat; The film is the most disturbing examination of feudal loyalty and insubordination ever seen in early Malay films.
Indera Bangsawan	Dhiresh Ghosh	Jins Shamsuddin, Sarimah, Saadiah, Kuswadinata, Haji Mahadi, K. Fatimah, S. Kadarisman, Malik Sutan Muda, Habsah		Malay Film Productions
Jalak Lenteng	Salleh Ghani	Yusof Latiff, Latifah Omar, Mahmud June, Wahid Satay		Cathay-Keris Film
Lela Satria	S. Roomai Noor	Mahmud June, Fatimah Ahmad, Wahid Satay		Cathay-Keris Film
Mas Merah	Dhiresh Ghosh	Ahmad Mahmud, Saadiah, Sri Dewi, A. Rahim, Habsah, Saamah, Salleh Kamil, Kemat Hassan, Malik Sutan Muda, M. Zain		Malay Film Productions
Panji Semerang	Omar Rojik	Saadiah, Aziz Jaafar, S. Kadarisman, Dayang Sofia, Normadiah		Malay Film Productions
Puteri Gunong Ledang	S. Roomai Noor	Mazlan Ahmad, Fatimah Ahmad, Wahid Satay, Puteh Lawak	Drama / Fantasy	Cathay-Keris Film; Based on Puteri Gunung Ledang
Rahsia Kejayaan Anak & Aneka Hiboran	S. Kadarisman			Merdeka Film Productions
Seniman Bujang Lapok (The Nitwit Movie Stars)	P. Ramlee	P. Ramlee, S. Shamsuddin, Aziz Sattar, Saloma, Zaiton, Ahmad Nisfu, Kemat Hassan, Ahmad Mahmud, M. Zain, Kuswadinata, HM Busra, M. Rafee, S. Kadarisman, Hashimah Yon, Shariff Dol, Leng Hussein, Siti Tanjung Perak	Comedy	Malay Film Productions; Preceded by Bujang Lapok (1957), Pendekar Bujang Lapok (1958) and Ali Baba Bujang Lapok (1961)
Si Tanggang	Jamil Sulong	Jins Shamsuddin, Sarimah, Haji Mahadi, Zaiton, Normadiah, Salleh Kamil, S. Kadarisman, Momo Latiff	Drama	Malay Film Productions; Based on Malin Kundang
Singapura Dilanggar Todak	Omar Rojik	Aziz Jaafar, Hashimah Yon, S. Kadarisman, Kuswadinata, Ahmad CB, Bat Latiff, M. Babjan		Malay Film Productions; Based on Singapura Dilanggar Todak
Siti Zubaidah	B.N. Rao	Nordin Ahmad, Maria Menado, Siput Sarawak, M. Amin, Mahmud June, Roseyatimah, Mat Sentol		Cathay-Keris Film-Maria Menado Production co-production
Sri Mersing	Salleh Ghani	Nordin Ahmad, Rosnani Jamil, Mahmud June, Roseyatimah, Mustapha Maarof, Wahid Satay	Drama / Romance	Cathay-Keris Film
Sri Tanjong	Jamil Sulong	Ahmad Mahmud, Hashimah Yon, Bat Latiff, Normadiah, Omar Suwita, Rahmah Rahmat, Haji Mahadi, Malik Sutan Muda, A. Rahim, M. Rafie		Malay Film Productions; Based on Sri Tanjung
Sultan Mahmood Mangkat Di-julang (The Sultan Who Was Killed in a Sedan Chair)	K. M. Basker	Maria Menando, Nordin Ahmad, M. Amin, Mahmud June, Mustapha Maarof, Siput Sarawak, Wahid Satay	Drama / Tragedy	Cathay-Keris Film; Based on Makam Sultan Mahmud Mangkat Dijulang
Sumpitan Rachun	S. Roomai Noor	S. Roomai Noor, Latifah Omar, Mary Lim		Cathay-Keris Film
Tun Teja	L. Krishnan	Abdullah Chik, Salmah Ahmad, Mustapha Maarof, A. R. Tompel		Merdeka Film Productions
Tunggal	S. Kadarisman	Ahmad Mahmud, Noor Azizah, S. Kadarisman, Mahyon Ismail, Hussein Abu Hassan, Nor Sabariah		Merdeka Film Productions
Yatim Mustapha	B. N. Rao	Nordin Ahmad, Siput Sarawak, Umi Kalthum, Salmah Ahmad, Abdullah Chik, Mustapha Maarof, Habibah Harun, Abu Bakar Yem		Cathay-Keris Film
1962
Anak-ku Suami-ku	Omar Rojik	S. Ahmad, Sharifah Hanim		Merdeka Film Productions
You Kow Pik Ying (Ask And It Shall Be Given)				Cathay-Keris Film; Cantonese-language film
Badang	S. Roomai Noor	Wahid Satay, Zainol Gemok, Roseyatimah, Umi Kalthum, Shariff Medan, Dollah Sarawak, Yem, Siti Tanjung Perak, Ismail Bos, Mariam, Ani Jasmin, Murugapa, Udo Omar, Abdullah Sani, Mak Menah, Rahmah Ali	Drama / Fantasy	Cathay-Keris Film
Batu Durhaka	Omar Rojik	Jins Shamsuddin, Sarimah, Aziz Jaafar, S. Kadarisman, Kemat Hassan, Kuswadinata, Rahmah Rahmat, Sri Dewi, Malik Sutan Muda, Suraya, Habsah, Saamah	Drama	Malay Film Productions
Chelorong Cheloreng	S. Roomai Noor	Wahid Satay, Latifah Omar, Siti Tanjung Perak		Cathay-Keris Film
Dang Anom	Hussein Haniff	Nordin Ahmad, Fatimah Ahmad, Mahmud June, M. Amin, Roseyatimah, Yusof Latiff	Drama / Political	Cathay-Keris Film; Entered into the 1962 Asia Pacific Film Festival; Screened at the 1963 Asia Pacific Film Festival
Gerhana	Jamil Sulong	Ahmad Mahmud, Zaiton, Haji Mahadi, Rahmah Rahmat, Bat Latiff, Saamah, Habsah		Malay Film Productions; Entered into the 1964 Asia Pacific Film Festival
Ibu Mertua-ku (My Mother-In-Law)	P. Ramlee	P. Ramlee, Sarimah, Ahmad Mahmud, Zaiton, Mohd Hamid, Mak Dara, Ahmad Nisfu, Rahimah Alias, K. Fatimah, Shariff Dol, Zainon Fiji, M. Zain, Kuswadinata	Drama	Malay Film Productions; Entered into the 1963 Asia Pacific Film Festival
Jula Juli Bintang Tujoh	B. N. Rao	Nordin Ahmad, Wahid Satay, Umi Kalthum, Puteh Lawak, Roseyatimah	Fantasy	Cathay-Keris Film
Keris Sempena Riau	L. Krishnan	Abdullah Chik, Kasma Booty, Mustapha Maarof, Mahmud June, Salmah Ahmad, Nyak Othman		Merdeka Film Productions
Korban Kaseh	Hussein Haniff	Yusof Latiff, Fatimah Ahmad, Siput Sarawak, Yem	Drama / Romance	Cathay-Keris Film
Labu dan Labi	P. Ramlee	M. Zain, P. Ramlee, Mariani, Udo Omar, Rahimah Alias, Shariff Dol, Saloma, Sarimah, Aziz Sattar, Orkest Pancha Sitara, Orkest Puspa Raya, Nyong Ismail, Babjan, Supa'at	Comedy	Malay Film Productions
Laila Majnun	B. N. Rao	Nordin Ahmad, Latifah Omar, Umi Kalthum, Ahmad Nisfu, Habibah Harun, Abu Bakar	Drama / Fantasy	Cathay-Keris Film; Remake of the 1933 film of the same name
Lanchang Kuning (Yellow Sail Boat)	M. Amin	Nordin Ahmad, Latifah Omar, Yusof Latiff, Haji Arshad, Roseyatimah	Drama	Cathay-Keris Film
Lubalang Daik	Jamil Sulong	Aziz Jaafar, Sarimah, Jins Shamsuddin, S. Kadarisman, Rosnani Jamil, Normadiah, A. Rahim, Haji Mahadi, Habsah, Suraya Harun, Saamah		Malay Film Productions
Mabok Kepayang	Hussein Haniff	Wahid Satay, Ani Jasmin, Siti Tanjung Perak	Comedy / Romance	Cathay-Keris Film
Mata Shaitan	Hussein Haniff	Yusof Latiff, Fatimah Ahmad, Siput Sarawak, Dollah Sarawak, Siti Tanjung Perak		Cathay-Keris Film
Neracha	Dhiresh Ghosh	Jins Shamsuddin, Sarimah, Aziz Jaafar, S. Kadarisman, Murni Sarawak, M. Zain, Malik Sutan Muda	Drama	Malay Film Productions
Norlela	Dhiresh Ghosh	Aziz Jaafar, Sarimah, Murni Sarawak, S. Kadarisman, Salleh Kamil, Kuswadinata, M. Rafee, Omar Suwita		Malay Film Productions
Ratapan Ibu	L. Krishnan	Mustapha Maarof, Kasma Booty, Abdullah Chik, Norasmah, Rosemawati		Merdeka Film Productions
Selindang Merah	L. Krishnan	Abdullah Chik, Kasma Booty, Salmah Ahmad, Mustapha Maarof, Mahmood June		Merdeka Film Productions
Siti Muslihat	Dhiresh Ghosh	Ahmad Mahmud, Saadiah, Shariff Dol, Ahmad Nisfu, Aziz Sattar, Ibrahim Pendek, Mariani, Kemat Hassan, S. Shamsuddin, M. Zain	Comedy	Malay Film Productions
Siti Payung	Salleh Ghani	Mustapha Maarof, Salmah Ahmad, Kasma Booty, Abdullah Chik, Mahmud June, Latifah Omar		Merdeka Film Productions
Tun Fatimah	Salleh Ghani	Maria Menado, Nordin Ahmad, Yusof Latiff, Roseyatimah, Salleh Melan, Ahmad Nisfu	Drama / Action	Cathay-Keris Film; Screened at the 2003 Singapore International Film Festival; Based on Tun Fatimah
1963
Anak Manja	Salleh Ghani	Mustapha Maarof, Kasma Booty, Rosemawati, Abdullah Chik, Mahyon Ismail		Merdeka Film Productions
Bayangan Di-Waktu Fajar	Usmar Ismail	S. Roomai Noor, Latifah Omar		Cathay-Keris Film; Entered into the 1963 Asia Pacific Film Festival
Black Gold		Orchid Wong, Pan En		
Budi dan Dosa (Virtue and Sin)	Jamil Sulong	Jins Shamsuddin, Zaiton, Hashimah Yon, Haji Mahadi, Zainon Fiji, Kuswadinata		Malay Film Productions
Bunga Tanjong		Maria Menado, Siput Sarawak, Ahmad Nisfu		Cathay-Keris Film-Maria Menado Production co-production
Chempaka Biru	B. N. Rao	Ghazali Sumantri, Suraya Harun, Roseyatimah, Yem		Cathay-Keris Film
Chuchu Dato' Merah	M. Amin	Nordin Ahmad, Latifah Omar, Roseyatimah, A. Rahim, Yem Jaafar, Dollah Sarawak, Rahimah Alias, Minah Yem, M. Osman, Mansor	Drama / Action	Cathay-Keris Film; Film set in Terengganu
Darah Muda	Jamil Sulong	Jins Shamsuddin, Sarimah, Salleh Kamil, Mariani, S. Kadarisman		Malay Film Productions
Darah-ku	Ramon A. Estella	Malik Selamat, Maria Menado		Cathay-Keris Film-Maria Menado Production co-production
Fajar Menyinsing	L. Krishnan	Abdullah Chik, Norasmah, Mahmud June, Kasma Booty, Mustapha Maarof		Merdeka Film Productions
Gila Talak	Hussein Haniff	Wahid Satay, Fatimah Ahmad, Yusof Latiff, Dollah Sarawak, Siti Tanjung Perak, Umi Kalthum	Comedy / Romance	Cathay-Keris Film; Preceded by Masok Angin Keluar Asap (1963)
Gul Bakawali	B. N. Rao	Nordin Ahmad, Latifah Omar, Wahid Satay		Cathay-Keris Film
Ibu Ayam	Salleh Ghani	Mustapha Maarof, Salmah Ahmad, Mak Dara, Mahmud June, Aziz M. Osman		Merdeka Film Productions
Kaseh Tanpa Sayang	Omar Rojik	Ahmad Mahmud, Hashimah Yon, Normadiah, Aziz Jaafar, Rosnani Jamil, Normadiah, M. Zain, Habsah, Ibrahim Pendek, Omar Suwita		Malay Film Productions
Korban	Dhiresh Ghosh	Ahmad Mahmud, Saadiah, S. Kadarisman, Mariani, Zaiton, Kuswadinata, Omar Suwita, Malik Sutan Muda, Bat Latiff, Haslinda		Malay Film Productions
Masok Angin Keluar Asap	Hussein Haniff	Wahid Satay, Fatimah Ahmad, Yusof Latiff, Dollah Sarawak, Siti Tanjung Perak, Udo Omar, Mat Sentol	Comedy / Romance	Cathay-Keris Film
Melanchong Ka-Tokyo	Ramon A. Estella	Aziz Jaafar, Saadiah, S. Kadarisman, Asao Mutsumoto, Motoko Furukawa, Normadiah, M. Zain, Rahmah Rahmat, P. Ramlee, Ahmad Daud, Saloma		Malay Film Productions; Coloured film Film set in Singapore and Japan
Nasib Si Labu Labi	P. Ramlee	P. Ramlee, M. Zain, Udo Omar, Mariani, Ibrahim Pendek, S. Shamsuddin, Murni Sarawak, Habsah Buang, S. Sudarmaji, Aziz Sattar, Ahmad Nisfu, Dayang Sofia, Ahmad Mahmud, Rosnani Jamil, Omar Rojik, Sarimah, Saloma, Asmaon, Mohd Hamid, Jamaluddin	Comedy	Malay Film Productions; Preceded by Labu dan Labi (1962)
Pileh Menantu	Omar Rojik	Aziz Jaafar, Sarimah, M. Zain, Dayang Sofia, Ibrahim Pendek, Habsah, Ahmad Nisfu, Udo Omar, Mustarjo, Aziz Sattar		Malay Film Productions
Pontianak Kembali (The Vampire Returns)	Ramon A. Estella	Maria Menado, Malik Selamat	Horror	Cathay-Keris Film-Maria Menado Production co-production
Puteri Chempaka Biru	B. N. Rao	Ghazali Sumantri, Suraya Harun, Rose Yatimah, Yem		Cathay-Keris Film
Raja Bersiong	Ramon A. Estella	Malik Selamat, Maria Menado, Eddy Ali, Raden Sudiro, Izat Emir, Asnawi, Marsita, Alias Congo, King Godobell, Raden Juriah	Drama / Horror	Cathay-Keris Film-Maria Menado Production co-production
Rumah Itu Dunia Aku	M. Amin	S. Roomai Noor, Latifah Omar, Malik Selamat, Roseyatimah, Tony Kassim		Cathay-Keris Film
Tajul Ashikin	M. Amin	Nordin Ahmad, Roseyatimah		Cathay-Keris Film
Tangkap Basah	Salleh Ghani	Mustapha Maarof, Kasma Booty, Mahmud June, Mak Dara, Rosemawati		Merdeka Film Productions
1964
Ayer Mata Duyong	M. Amin	Nordin Ahmad, Suraya Haron, Malik Selamat, Neng Yatimah, Salina, Rohani Yusoff, Ahmad Nisfu	Fantasy	Cathay-Keris Film
Dua Pendekar (Two Warriors)	Hussein Haniff	Yusof Latiff, Roseyatimah, Salleh Melan, Siti Tanjung Perak	Drama / Action	Cathay-Keris Film
Dupa Chendana	Ramon A. Estella	Ahmad Mahmud, Saadiah, Mariani, Aziz Jaafar, S. Kadarisman		Malay Film Productions
Hujan Darah	Salleh Ghani	Ali Rahman, Sophia Ibrahim, Rosemawati, Abdullah Chik		Merdeka Film Productions
Hutang Darah Di-Bayar Darah	Hussein Haniff	Nordin Ahmad, Roseyatimah		Cathay-Keris Film
Istana Berdarah	Hussein Haniff	Yusof Latiff, Salleh Melan, Fatimah Ahmad	Drama / Action	Cathay-Keris Film; Adaptation of Throne of Blood (1957); Based on Macbeth, written by William Shakespeare
Jauh Di-Mata	Fred Young	Abdullah Chik, Sophia Ibrahim, Rosemawati, Derwis Mansoor		Merdeka Film Productions
Jeritan Batin	Omar Rojik	Ahmad Mahmud, Saadiah, Aziz Jaafar, Normadiah, Haji Mahadi, Omar Suwita, Aziz Sattar		Malay Film Productions
Kalong Kenangan	Hussein Haniff	Ghazali Sumantri, Latifah Omar, Haji Arshad, Umi Kalthum		Cathay-Keris Film
Madu Tiga (Three Wives)	P. Ramlee	P. Ramlee, Sarimah, Jah Mahadi, Zaharah Agus, Ahmad Nisfu, M. Rafee, Mislia, Zainon Fiji, Ahmad Sabree, M. Babjan, Doris Han, Alias Congo	Comedy	Malay Film Productions; Entered into the 1964 Asia Pacific Film Festival
Mambang Moden	Jamil Sulong	Aziz Jaafar, Saadiah, Normadiah, Aziz Sattar, S. Shamsuddin, Momo Latiff		Malay Film Productions
Mat 3/4	Mat Sentol	Mat Sentol, Noraini, Wahid Satay, Siti Tanjung Perak, Alias Congo, Ahmad Osman, Ismail Bos	Comedy	Cathay-Keris Film
Mata Permata (Eyes of Evil)	Osman Shamsuddin	SM Salim, Norlidar Saidi, Siti Hawa Zain, Abu Bakar Ahmad, Norma Salim, Wan Chik	Drama	Malayan Film Unit; Entered into the 1964 Asia Pacific Film Festival; Based on The Necklace, written by Guy de Maupassant
Panglima Besi	M. Amin	Nordin Ahmad, Roseyatimah, M. Wari	Drama / Action	Cathay-Keris Film
Pontianak Gua Musang (The Vampire of the Civet-cat Cave)	B. N. Rao	Suraya Haron, Wahid Satay, Mat Sentol	Horror	Cathay-Keris Film
Ragam P. Ramlee	P. Ramlee	P. Ramlee, Saloma, Fazliyaton, Raden Sudiro, Sophia Ibrahim, Hashim Hamzah, Noor Jin, Fatimah Yaakob, Jaafar Rahman, Kasma Booty, Mahmood June, Ali Rahman, Idris Hashim, Yusof Banjar, Minah Hashim, Zsa Zsa Loma	Musical / Comedy / Drama	Merdeka Film Productions
Siapa Besar!	Omar Rojik	Aziz Sattar, Zaiton, Normadiah, Udo Omar, S. Shamsuddin, Ibrahim Pendek, Ahmad Daud		Malay Film Productions
Sitora Harimau Jadian (The Tigerman)	P. Ramlee	P. Ramlee, Mahmud June, Rosmawati, Ali Rahman, Minah Hashim, Fazliyaton, Idris Hashim, Yusof Surya	Drama / Horror	Merdeka Film Productions
Tiga Abdul (The Three Abduls)	P. Ramlee	P. Ramlee, Haji Mahadi, S. Kadarisman, Ahmad Nisfu, Sarimah, Mariani, Dayang Sofia, M. Babjan, Salleh Kamil, S. Shamsuddin, HM Busra, Nyong Ismail, Ahmad Sabri, S. Sudarmaji, Hashim Salleh, Ahmad Ghani, Udo Omar, Mahmud Hitam, Mahmod Jatirata, Kassim Masdor, Munsi Salleh, Adenan, Saloma	Comedy / Family	Malay Film Productions
The 7th Dawn	Lewis Gilbert	William Holden, Capucine, Tetsurō Tamba, Susannah York	Drama	United Artists; Colour by Technicolor
Tun Mandan	Salleh Ghani	Abdullah Chik, Salmah Ahmad, Rosemawati, Mustapha Maarof		Malay Film Productions
Wan Perkasa	Nordin Ahmad	M. Amin, Latifah Omar, Malik Selamat, Siput Sarawak, Tony Kassim, Dollah Sarawak	Drama / Action	Cathay-Keris Film
1965
Bidasari	Jamil Sulong	Jins Shamsuddin, Sarimah, S. Kadarisman, Malik Sutan Muda, Habsah, Saamah, S. Shamsuddin, HM Bosra, M. Rafee, Zahara Ahmad		Malay Film Productions
Bumiputra	Dhiresh Ghosh	Mahmud June, Sophia Ibrahim, Fazliyaton, Minah Hashim, Idris Hashim, Sonny Abdullah, Haji Othman		Merdeka Film Productions
Chinta Kaseh Sayang	Hussein Haniff	Latifah Omar, Ahmad Osman, Ghazali Sumantri, Fatimah Ahmad	Drama	Cathay-Keris Film
Dajal Suchi	Dhiresh Ghosh	Sophia Ibrahim, Ali Rahman, Mahmud June, Darus Shah, Abdul Ghani Aziz, Adik Badariah, Idris Hashim, P. Ramlee, Saloma	Drama	Merdeka Film Productions
Dayang Senandong	Jamil Sulong	Ahmad Mahmud, Sarimah, Haji Mahadi, Salleh Kamil, Habsah, Malik Sutan Muda, Ibrahim Pendek		Malay Film Productions
Ikan Emas	M. Amin	Ghazali Sumantri, Latifah Omar, Siput Sarawak		Cathay-Keris Film
Jembatan Maut	Maroeti	A. Mokhtar, Sophia Ibrahim, A. Bakar Jaafar		Merdeka Film Productions
Jiran Sekampong	M. Amin	Yusof Latiff, Roseyatimah, Siput Sarawak, Momo Latiff		Cathay-Keris Film
Kaseh Ibu	Nordin Ahmad	Mustapha Maarof, Latifah Omar, Bat Latiff		Cathay-Keris Film
Masam Masam Manis	P. Ramlee	P. Ramlee, Sharifah Hanim, Mariani, Mahmud June, Minah Hashim, Raden Sudiro, Chik, Adik Murad	Comedy / Romance	Merdeka Film Productions
Mata dan Hati	M. Amin	Tony Kassim, Roseyatimah, Siput Sarawak, M. Wari, Mustapha Maarof		Cathay-Keris Film
Muda Mudi	M. Amin	Siput Sarawak, Roseyatimah, Tony Kassim, Malik Selamat		Cathay-Keris Film
Nora Zain: Ajen Wanita 001	Low Wai	Saadiah, Aziz Jaafar, Sarimah, Nordin Arshad	Action	Shaw Brothers; Coloured film Based on James Bond
Patong Chendana	M. Amin	Nordin Ahmad, Latifah Omar, Siput Sarawak		Cathay-Keris Film
Pusaka Pontianak	Ramon A. Estella	Ahmad Mahmud, Saadiah, Ahmad Daud, Haji Mahadi, Normadiah, Salleh Kamil, Ibrahim Pendek, Aziz Sattar, Ahmad Nisfu	Horror	Malay Film Productions
Sayang Si Buta	Omar Rojik	Jins Shamsuddin, Sarimah, Dayang Sofia, Aziz Jaafar, Ibrahim Pendek, Saamah, M. Zain, Mohd Hamid, Ahmad Nisfu	Drama	Malay Film Productions
Takdir	Omar Rojik	Jins Shamsuddin, Saadiah, Zaiton, S. Kadarisman, Normadiah, Aziz Sattar		Malay Film Productions
Tiga Botak	Mat Sentul	Mat Sentol, Wahid Satay, Ismail Boss, Suraya Harun, Ghazali Sumantri	Comedy	Cathay-Keris Film
1966
Aksi Kuching	Omar Rojik	Aziz Sattar, Zaiton, Ahmad Daud		Malay Film Productions
Anak Buloh Betong	S. Kadarisman	Aziz Jaafar, Saadiah, Ahmad Mahmud, Rosnani Jamil, Normadiah, Haji Mahadi		Malay Film Productions
Anak Dara	M. Amin	Tony Kassim, Suraya Haron, Malik Selamat, Jah Lelawati, S. Rosli, Mat Sentol, Wahid Satay		Cathay-Keris Film
Dahaga	Omar Rojik	Aziz Jaafar, Sarimah, Norma Zainal, S. Shamsuddin, Malik Sutan Muda		Malay Film Productions
Do Re Mi	P. Ramlee	Ibrahim Din, A. R. Tompel, P. Ramlee, Wan Chik Daud, Noran Nordin, Rohaya Rahman, Mahmud June, Minah Hashim, Sharif Baboo, Usman Eot, Bakar M, Idris Hashim, AK Jailani, Ahmad Dadida, Saloma, Karim Latiff	Comedy	Merdeka Film Productions
Dua Kali Lima	M. Amin	Mat Sentol, Anita Sarawak, Wahid Satay, Siti Tanjung Perak, Ahmad Nisfu	Comedy	Cathay-Keris Film
Gadis Langkawi	Dhiresh Ghosh	Sonny Abdullah, Sharifah Hanim, Sophia Ibrahim, Ibrahim Din, Noran Nordin, Yem, Minah Hashim, Haji Othman, R. Suriani		Merdeka Film Productions
Gurindam Jiwa (Sonnet of the Soul)	M. Amin	Nordin Ahmad, Latifah Omar, Malek Selamat	Drama / Romance	Cathay-Keris Film
Jefry Zain: Gerak Kilat	Jamil Sulong	Jins Shamsuddin, Sarimah, Salleh Kamil, Rahmah Rahmat, Ibrahim Bachik, Shariff Dol, Omar Suwita, Sylvia Koh, M. Rafee, Rita Cheong, Rene Richardson, Margaret Clougher	Action	Malay Film Productions; Based on James Bond
Kacha Permata	Jamil Sulong	Jins Shamsuddin, Rosnani Jamil, Haji Mahadi, Zaiton, Normah Zainal, Mariani, Ahmad Daud, Kuswadinata	Drama	Malay Film Productions
Naga Tasek Chini	Nordin Ahmad	Mustapha Maarof, Latifah Omar, Siput Sarawak, Malik Selamat, Wahid Satay	Mystery / Fantasy	Cathay-Keris Film
Nasib Do Re Mi	P. Ramlee	P. Ramlee, A. R. Tompel, Ibrahim Din, Ghazali Sumantri, Mahyon Ismail, Mahmood June, Habibah Haron, Idris Hashim, A. Bakar Jaafar, Husny Hassan, A. Azman, Shariff Baboo, Hussein Abu Hassan, Yusoff Suria, Jailani, Radin Sudiro, Nor Jin, Nor KK, Hashim Hamzah, Yem, Ramlee Ismail, Ahmad Dadida, Karim Latiff, Saloma, Wan Chik Daud	Comedy	Merdeka Film Productions; Preceded by Do Re Mi (1966)
Sabarudin Tukang Kasot	P. Ramlee	P. Ramlee, Saloma, Jah Ismail, Ibrahim Din, Raden Sudiro, Mahmud June, Idris Hashim, Jamal 'Kerdil' Mohammad, Haji Othman, Yem	Comedy / Fantasy	Merdeka Film Productions
Sri Andalas	S. Kadarisman	Ahmad Mahmud, Sarimah, Aziz Jaafar, Noor Azizah, Salleh Kamil, Malik Sutan Muda, S. Kadarisman, Ed Osmera, Normadiah, Aziz Sattar		Malay Film Productions
Udang Di Sebalek Batu	Hussein Haniff	Mustapha Maarof, Roseyatimah		Cathay-Keris Film
1967
A Go Go 67	Omar Rojik	Aziz Jaafar, Noor Azizah, Norma Zainal, Kuswadinata, S. Shamsuddin, Ibrahim Pendek	Musical	Malay Film Productions
Dharma Kesuma	S. Kadarisman	Ed Osmera, Sarimah, S. Rosley, Dayang Sulu, Hussein Abu Hassan, Tamam Idris		Merdeka Film Productions
Dosa Wanita (A Woman's Sin)	M. Amin	Fatimah Ahmad, Salim Bachik, Malek Selamat, Umi Kalthum, Dollah Dagang	Drama	Cathay-Keris Film
Jebak Maut	Jamil Sulong	Ahmad Mahmud, Rosy Wong, Aziz Jaafar, Haji Mahadi, Salleh Kamil, Mohd Hamid, Malik Sutan Muda, Thassani, Susan Chua	Thriller	Malay Film Productions
Keluarga 69	P. Ramlee	P. Ramlee, A. R. Tompel, Siput Sarawak, Idris Hashim, Khatijah Hashim, Noran Nordin, Salleh Ghani, Ed Osmera, Julie Faridah, Yusoff Bujang, Karim Latiff, Ahmad Dadida, Jailani, Ibrahim Joned, Minah Hashim, Rozelan, Puteh Ramlee, Shariff Baboo, Saloma, Mak Enon	Comedy	Merdeka Film Productions
Lampong Karam	S. Kadarisman	S. Rosley, Saadiah, Zaiton, Yusof Latiff, Normadiah, S. Kadarisman, Shariff Dol, Sri Dewi, Kuswadinata		Malay Film Productions
Mat Bond	M. Amin, Mat Sentol	Mat Sentol, Siti Tanjung Perak, Dollah Sarawak, Malek Selamat	Comedy	Cathay-Keris Film
Mat Raja Kapor	M. Amin, Mat Sentol	Mat Sentol, E. Daud, Ahmad Nisfu	Comedy	Cathay-Keris Film; Preceded by Mat Bond (1967)
Play Boy	Nordin Ahmad	Nordin Ahmad, Rosnani Jamil, Mustapha Maarof		Cathay-Keris Film
Sesudah Suboh	P. Ramlee	P. Ramlee, Juliana Ibrahim, Ed Osmera, Khatijah Hashim, Vera Wee, Hoon Thye Chong, Suriya Kumari, VI Stanley, Raden Sudiro, Sivapakiam Dharmalinggam, HG Gill, Saloma	Drama	Merdeka Film Productions
Terlibat	S. Kadarisman	S. Rosely, Sharifah Aminah, Shirley Koh, Aziz Sattar, Haji Mahadi, Salleh Kamil, Ghazali Sumantri, Hussein Abu Hassan		Malay Film Productions
1968
Ahmad Albab	P. Ramlee	P. Ramlee, Saloma, A. R. Tompel, Mariani, Mimi Loma, Karim Latiff, Tony Azman	Comedy / Family	Merdeka Film Productions
Amok Tok Nading	S. Kadarisman	Jins Shamsuddin, Khatijah Hashim, Hussein Abu Hassan, S. Kadarisman		Merdeka Film Productions
Anak Bapak (Papa's Pet)	P. Ramlee	P. Ramlee, Roseyatimah, A. R. Tompel, Ibrahim Din, Noran Nordin, Ruminah Sidek, Saloma, Shariff Baboo, Ahmad Dadida, Idris Hashim, Karim Latif, Nor Jin	Comedy / Family	Merdeka Film Productions
Bayangan Ajal	Low Wai	Jins Shamsuddin, Landi Chang, Sharifah Aminah, Fanny Fan	Action	Shaw Brothers; Coloured film Film set in Hong Kong
Di-Antara Dua Nesan	Ahmad Mahmud	Ahmad Mahmud, Saadiah, Salleh Kamil		Ahmad Mahmud Productions
Gerimis	P. Ramlee	P. Ramlee, Chandra Shamugam, A. R. Tompel, Pak Yem, Ruminah Sidek, Tony Azman, Bakhtiar, Khatijah Hashim, VI Stanley, D. Theresa, Idris Hashim, Karim Latiff, Noran Nordin, Hashim, Hoon Thye Choong, Baby Sabaruddin, Saloma	Drama	Merdeka Film Productions; Film about interracial marriage Malay-language and Tamil-language film
Ibu-lah Shorga	S. Sudarmaji	Aziz Jaafar, Saadiah, Omar Suwita, Shariff Dol, S. Shamsuddin, Salleh Kamil		Gabongan Artis2 Melayu
Jurang Bahaya	Low Wai	Jins Shamsuddin, Landi Chang, Shen Yi	Action	Shaw Brothers; Coloured film
Kekaseh	Nordin Ahmad	Salim Bachik, Normah Zainal, Fatimah Ahmad, Shariff Medan, Dollah Dagang, Dollah Sarawak		Cathay-Keris Film
Lain Jalan Ka-Shorga	Jamil Sulong	Sonny Abdullah, Rosnani Jamil, Noran Nordin, Karim Latiff, Gas Shariff, Ed Osmera		Merdeka Film Productions
Mat Lanon	Mat Sentol	Mat Sentol	Comedy	Cathay-Keris Film
Miang-Miang Keladi	Omar Rojik	Jins Shamsuddin, Sarimah, Yahya Sulong, Zeera Agus		Merdeka Film Productions
Pendekar Empat	S. Kadarisman	Jins Shamsuddin, Sarimah, Hussein Abu Hassan, Mahyon Ismail, Kuswadinata	Action	Merdeka Film Productions
Pop Muda	M. Amin	Fatimah Ahmad		Cathay-Keris Film
Raja Bersiong (King With The Fangs / Vampire King)	Jamil Sulong	Ahmad Mahmud, Sarimah, Noor Azizah, Zaiton, Malik Sutan Muda, Ibrahim Pendek	Drama / Horror	Malay Film Productions; Coloured film Last film produced by Malay Film Productions
Si-Murai	Nordin Ahmad	Mustapha Maarof, Malik Selamat, Mariam, Mat Sentol, Ahmad Nisfu	Action	Cathay-Keris Film
Teratai	Omar Rojik	Ahmad Mahmud, Noor Azizah, Norsiati, Mahmud June, Darus Shah		Merdeka Film Productions
1969
Bukan Salah Ibu Mengandong	Jins Shamsuddin	Jins Shamsuddin, Sarimah, Ed Osmera, Sabariah Ibrahim, P. Ramlee, S. Roomai Noor, Zeera Agus, Umi Kalthum, Norizan, Rugayah, Taufik Ali, Ismail Mahmud, Jane Barr		Merdeka Film Productions
Di-Belakang Tabir	Jins Shamsuddin	Jins Shamsuddin, P. Ramlee, Noor Azizah, Hussein Abu Hassan, Karim Siraj, Monica Jones, Ali Rahman, Ibrahim, Gass Sheriff, Ismail Mahmud, Ali Abdullah, Hussein Jantan, Mustaffa, Rosli, Sultan, Asraf	Drama / Crime	Merdeka Film Productions
Enam Jahanam (Six Plunderers)	P. Ramlee	P. Ramlee, Noor Azizah, Yusof Latiff, Osman Md. Amin, JB Yusoff, Ahmad Dadida, Kamal Idris, Sharif Baboo, Ibrahim Sabtu, Idris Hashim, Minah Hashim, Yusuff Bujang, Karim Latiff	Action / Adventure	Merdeka Film Productions
Kalau Berpaut Di-Dahan Rapoh	Omar Rojik	Noor Azizah, Ismail Mahmud, Norlia Ramli, Nasir P. Ramlee, Karim Siraj		Merdeka Film Productions
Kanchan Tirana	P. Ramlee	P. Ramlee, Sarimah, Jins Shamsuddin, Ahmad Dadida, Idris Hashim, Tony Azman, Osman Botak, Kamal Idris, Minah Hashim, Rohayah, Norlia	Action	Merdeka Film Productions
Keranda Berdarah	Nordin Ahmad	Tony Kassim, S. Noni, Dayang Sofia, Shariff Dol, Salleh Melan		Cathay-Keris Film
Keranda Jingga	Omar Rojik	Ed Osmera, Norsiati, Hussein Abu Hassan, Mahmud June, Ali Rahman, Arman, Normaya		Merdeka Film Productions
Keris Emas	M. Amin	Kuswadinata		Cathay-Keris Film
Lanang Sejagat	Omar Rojik	Hussein Abu Hassan, Ahmad Mahmud, Ahmad B, Khatijah Hashim, Othman Amin	Action	Merdeka Film Productions
Mat Toyol	Mat Sentol	Mat Sentol, Momo Latiff, Dollah Sarawak, Din Wan Chik	Comedy	Cathay-Keris Film
Nafsu Belia	Nordin Ahmad			Cathay-Keris Film
Panglima Harimau Berantai	S. Kadarisman	Ed Osmera, Rohaya, Norlia, Taufik Ali, Fauziah Ahmad Daud	Action	Merdeka Film Productions
Serikandi	M. Amin	S. Noni, Nordin Ahmad, Malik Selamat	Drama / Action	Cathay-Keris Film
Sial Wanita	M. Amin	Nordin Ahmad, Saadiah	Drama	Cathay-Keris Film
