= List of Malaysian films before 1960 =

This is a list of the earliest films produced and released before 1960 in the British Malaya and Federation of Malaya (Colony of Singapore).

For an alphabetical listing of Malaysian films see Category:Malaysian films.

== 1920s ==
Title	Director	Cast	Genre	Notes
1927
New Friend	Kwok Chiu-man	Cheng Chao-jen, Luk Chao-yuk, Wee Mong-may	Comedy / Drama / Silent film	Nanyang Low Pui-kim; First film shot entirely in Singapore and Malaya.

== 1930s ==
Title	Director	Cast	Genre	Notes
1933
Leila Majnun	B. S. Rajhans	M. Suki, Fatimah Jasmin, Syed Ali Mansoor Al-Attas, Cik Tijah, Yem, Sharif Medan, Khairuddin	Drama / Romance	Motilal Chemical Company (Bombay); First Malay-language feature film produced in Malaya, loosely based on Layla and Majnun.
Samarang	Ward Wing	Ahmang, Sai-Yu, Chang Fu, Mamounah, Ko-Hal	Action	B.F. Zeidman Productions; English-language film
1937
Topeng Hitam (Black Mask)				Shaw Brothers
Gagak Hitam				Shaw Brothers
1938
Booloo	Cylde E. Elliot	Colin Tapley, Jayne Regan, Mamo Clark, Michio Ito, Herber de Souza, Fred Paulin, Claude King, William Stack, John Sutton, Ah Lee	Asian / Adventure / Thriller	Paramount Pictures; English-language film
Nelayan (Fisherman)				

== 1940s ==
Title	Director	Cast	Genre	Notes
1940
Bermadu (Polygamy)	How You & Wen Hai Ling	Aman Belon, Yem, Tina, Habsah	Drama	Shaw Brothers
Toping Saitan (The Devil's Mask)	How You & Wen Hai Ling	A. Rahman, Momo Latiff, Habsah, Mimi, Gong Manaf	Adventure	Shaw Brothers
Hanchor Hati (Broken Heart)	How You & Wen Hai Ling	Ahmad CB, Rose Philipina, Habsah, Yem, Tina, Mohd Amin, Mohd		Shaw Brothers
Mata Hantu (Ghost Eye)	How You & Wen Hai Ling	A. Rahman, Yem, Habsah, Rahmah		Shaw Brothers
Mutiara (Pearl)	How You & Wen Hai Ling	Hassan Temberang, Haji Gong Manaf, Aman Belon, Harun Elyas, Yem, Tina, Habsah		Shaw Brothers
Tiga Kekaseh (Three Lovers)	How You & Wen Hai Ling	Teruna, Juriah, Tina, Habsah, Mustajab, A. Rahman		Shaw Brothers
1941
Ibu Tiri (Stepmother)	How You & Wen Hai Ling	Che Tina, Mustajab, Aman Belon, Adi Teruna, Juriah, Gong Manaf, Zuriah, Aman, Md. Amin, Hafsah Buang, Dara, A. Rahman, Puteh Lawak		Shaw Brothers
Terang Bulan Di-Malaya (Bright Moon in Malaya)	How You & Wen Hai Ling	Ahmad CB, Juriah, Puteh Lawak, Tina, Yem, Habsah, Mustajab		Shaw Brothers
1942
Menantu Durhaka (Rebellious Son-in-law)	B. S. Rajhans	Mokhtar Wijaya, Tarmina, Haras, Yusuf Banjar, Juriah, S. Kadarisman		Tan Weng Film
1946
Seruan Merdeka (The Call to Freedom)	B. S. Rajhans	Salleh Ghani, Rokiah Hanafi, Johar, Siti Tanjung Perak	Action	Malayan Art Production
1947
Singapura Di-Waktu Malam (Singapore at the Night)	B. S. Rajhans	Bachtiar Affendi, Siput Sarawak		Malay Film Productions
Chempaka	B. S. Rajhans	Salleh Ghani, Kasma Booty, Yem, Maroeti, Suhara Effendi, Jaafar Wiryo		Malay Film Productions
1948
Chinta (Love)	B. S. Rajhans	S. Roomai Noor, Siput Sarawak, Jaafar Wiryo, Daeng Harris, P. Ramlee, Suhara Effendi, Norsiah, Lelawati	Drama / Romance	Malay Film Productions; Chinta was the first Malayan film released after the declaration of the Malayan Emergency, and also marks the first screen appearance of P. Ramlee. It is the oldest surviving film of Malayan cinema.
Pisau Berachun (Poisonous Knife)	B. S. Rajhans	Bachtiar Affendi, Kasma Booty, Jaafar Wiryo, Johar		Malay Film Productions
Kampung Sentosa (Tranquil Village)	B. Reaves E. Elliot	Mohd Nor Lambak, Raja Hamidah Raja Saat		Sound Master (New York) Company
1949
Nasib (Fate)	B. S. Rajhans	S. Roomai Noor, Siput Sarawak, Haji Gong, Tina, Daeng Harris, P. Ramlee, Jaafar Wiryo	Drama	Malay Film Productions; Entered into the 1950 BFI London Film Festival
Nilam (Sapphire)	B. S. Rajhans	S. Roomai Noor, Siput Sarawak, Daeng Harris, P. Ramlee, Jaafar Wiryo, Siti Tanjung Perak, Neng Yatimah	Fantasy	Malay Film Productions
Noor Asmara	B. S. Rajhans	S. Roomai Noor, Kasma Booty, Daeng Harris, Baby Mardiana, Siti Tanjung Perak, Jaafar Wiryo, Ahmad CB, Norsiah, P. Ramlee	Musical / Romance	Malay Film Productions

== 1950s ==
Title	Director	Cast	Genre	Notes
1950
Aloha	B. S. Rajhans	Mariam, Osman Gumanti, P. Ramlee, Jaafar Wiryo, Roseminah, Siti Tanjung Perak, Daeng Idris, Daeng Harris, A. R. Tompel, S. Shamsuddin	Drama / Romance	Malay Film Productions
Bakhti (Faithfulness)	L. Krishnan	P. Ramlee, Kasma Booty, S. Roomai Noor, Siput Sarawak, Yusof Banjar	Drama	Malay Film Productions
Dewi Murni (Sacred Goddess)	B. S. Rajhans	Osman Gumanti, Kasma Booty, Daeng Harris, A. R. Tompel, M. Amin, Mariam	Drama / Romance	Malay Film Productions
Kampung Sentosa (Tranquil Village)	G. Tom	Mohd Nor Lambak, Raja Hamidah Raja Saat		American Film Inn
Pelangi (Rainbow)	Naz Achnas	Ismail Kasim, Nona Asiah, Saloma, Eloni Hayat, Saliman S, Mustarjo, S. Naning		Nusantara Film
Pembalasan (Revenge)	L. Krishnan	S. Roomai Noor, Siput Sarawak, Marliah, Rokiah Jaafar, M. Amin	Drama	Malay Film Productions
Rachun Dunia (Poison of the World)	B. S. Rajhans	Osman Gumanti, Kasma Booty, Siput Sarawak, Jaafar Wiryo, P. Ramlee, Baby Supatri, A. R. Tompel, Siti Tanjung Perak, Haji Gong, Neng Yatimah	Drama	Malay Film Productions
Sesal Tak Sudah (Regret Forever)	A. R. Tompel	Ratna Si, Daeng Idris, Salbiah Harun, Saloma, R. Suriani, A. R. Tompel		Nusantara Film
Takdir Illahi (God's Destiny)	L. Krishnan	P. Ramlee, Neng Yatimah, Yusuf Banjar, Daeng Idris, Siti Tanjung Perak, Salmah, A. R. Tompel, Daeng Harris	Drama	Malay Film Productions
Kembar (Twin)	S. Ramanathan	M. Amin, Mariam, Daeng Harris, Siti Tanjung Perak	Drama / Romance	Malay Film Productions
1951
Bapa Saya (My Father)	B. S. Rajhans	A. R. Tompel, Neng Yatimah, Osman Gumanti, Rokiah Jaafar, Siti Tanjung Perak	Drama	Malay Film Productions
Berdosa (Guilty)	S. Ramanathan	S. Roomai Noor, Rokiah Jaafar, Siput Sarawak, Yem		Malay Film Productions
Bunga Perchintaan (Flower of Romance)	L. Krishnan	Mustapha Maarof, Mislia, Nursiah K		Rimau Film Production
Derita (Suffering)	L. Krishnan	Ali Rahman, Neng Yatimah, Mariam, A. Rahim		Malay Film Productions
Juwita	S. Ramanathan	P. Ramlee, Kasma Booty, A. Rahim, Salmah, Ulong Jawa, Saadiah, Daeng Harris, Siti Tanjung Perak	Drama / Romance	Malay Film Productions
Manusia (Human)	S. Ramanathan	Omar Rojik, Kasma Booty, Jaafar Wiryo, Jaafar Shah, Zainab, Hashimah Yon, Zubaidah		Malay Film Productions
Matahari (Sun)	Ramon A. Estella	Maria Menado, Ahmad Mahmud, Salleh Kamil, Omar Rojik, Daeng Idris, Alice Ma, Kemat Hassan, Jins Shamsuddin	Drama / Action	Malay Film Productions; Film about independence struggle
Penghidupan (Lifelihood)	L. Krishnan	P. Ramlee, Rokiah Jaafar, Maria Menado, Daeng Harris, Ulong Jawa, Siti Tanjung Perak, Mohd Yusuf, Saamah, Junaisi	Drama	Malay Film Productions
Perkahwinan Rahsia (Secret Wedding)	Hsu Chiao Meng	Eloni Hayat, S. Kadarisman, Rokiah Hanafi, Daeng Idris, S. Naning, Saloma	Comedy	Nusantara Film
Pulau Mutiara (Pearl Island)	S. Ramanathan	Osman Gumanti, Maria Menado, A. R. Tompel, Siti Rohani		Malay Film Productions
Rayuan Sukma (The Longing of the Soul)	L. Krishnan	Ali Rahman, Zubaidah, A. Rahim, Omar Rojik, Junaidah, Ulong Jawa, Saamah	Drama / Romance	Malay Film Productions
Sejoli (Lovebird)	B. S. Rajhans	Kasma Booty, Rokiah Jaafar, Neng Yatimah, P. Ramlee, Jaafar Wiryo, Daeng Harris, S. Shamsuddin, Osman B., M. Yusuf, Siti Tanjung Perak, M. Amin	Drama / Romance	Malay Film Productions
1952
Aladdin	B. S. Rajhans	Ali Rahman, Mariam, Jaafar Shah, M. Amin, S. Shamsuddin		Malay Film Productions; Adapted from the folk tale of the same name
Anjoran Nasib (Fate's Hand)	B. S. Rajhans	P. Ramlee, Mariam, Musalmah, Daeng Harris, Harun Omar, Saadiah, Omar Rojik, R. Azmi, S. Sudarmaji, Ahmad C, Salleh Kamil, Saamah, Marliah	Drama	Malay Film Productions
Antara Senyum Dan Tangis (Between Smiles and Tears)	L. Krishnan	P. Ramlee, Rokiah Jaafar, Musalmah, M. Amin, Harun Omar, M. Yusuf Banjar, Siti Tanjung Perak, Saamah, Baby Zaitun	Drama / Romance	Malay Film Productions
Chemburu (Jealous)	S. Ramanathan	Yusoff Latiff, Rosnani Jamil, Mariani, Nordin Ahmad, Siti Tanjung Perak, Haji Mahadi		Malay Film Productions
Chinta Murni	A. R. Tompel	S. Kadarisman, Rahman B, Salbiah Harun, R. Suriani		Nusantara Film
Dian (Candle)	Naz Achnas	S. Kadarisman, Normadiah, Junaidah, Osman Gumanti, Daeng Idris, Mardiana		Nusantara Film
Gadis Peladang (Farmer Girl)	B. S. Rajhans	Yusoff Latiff, Neng Yatimah, Maria Menado, Daeng Harris, Omar Rojik, Salleh Kamil, Marliah, Jamil Sulong		Malay Film Productions
Jiwa Lara (Sick Soul)	S. Ramanathan	Osman Gumanti, Rokiah Jaafar, Neng Yatimah	Drama	Malay Film Productions
Lupa Daratan (Be Delirious)	L. Krishnan	Omar Rojik, Rosnani Jamil, Jamil Sulong, Haron Omar		Malay Film Productions
Miskin (The Poor)	K. M. Basker	P. Ramlee, Rosnani Jamil, Musalmah, Haron Omar, Omar Rojik, Saemah, Jamil Sulong, Ahmad Chetti	Drama / Romance	Malay Film Productions
Norma	A. R. Tompel	S. Kadarisman, Salbiah Harun, Saloma, S. Naning, Hamidar, Daeng Idris, Bahar Said, A. R. Tompel		Nusantara Film
Pachar Putih (White Girlfriend)	Naz Achnas	S. Kadarisman, Normadiah, Junaidah, A. Rahim, Daeng Idris, Hamidar		Nusantara Film
Patah Hati (Broken Hearted)	K. M. Basker	P. Ramlee, Neng Yatimah, Musalmah, Mohd Hamid, Ulong Jawa, Hashim Nor, Jamil Sulong, Marliah Ahmad, Aini Jasmin, Ahmad Chetty, Fatimah A, R. Samiadji Widjaja, Malik Sutan Muda, Said Zain, Saidi	Drama / Romance	Malay Film Productions
Permata Di-Perlimbahan (Jewels in the Valley)	Haji Mahadi	Nordin Ahmad, Maria Menado, Salmah Ibrahim, Rokiah Jaafar, J. Husny, Suud Jr	Drama	Malay Film Productions
Ramli Ramlah	Jaafar Wiryo	Rosini, Ahmad Shah, Turminah		Keris Film Production
Sedarah (Incest)	S. Ramanathan	P. Ramlee, Rosnani Jamil, A. Rahim, Haji Mahadi, Siti Tanjung Perak, Saadiah, S. Shamsuddin, Aini Jasmin, Saamah, Malik Sutan Muda, Salleh Abdullah, Kamarudin, Salleh Kamil, Salmah, Ulong Jawa	Drama	Malay Film Productions
Seniati	Chow Wing Kok, A. R. Tompel	A. Bakarruddin, Normadiah, S. Kadarisman, Junaidah, Daeng Idris, A. Rahim, A. R. Tompel		Nusantara Film
Setia (Loyal)	A. S. Simons	Rosini, Ahmad Mahmud, M. Amin, S. Alton		Keris Film Production
Tas Tangan Wanita (Women's Handbag)	L. Krishnan	Osman Gumanti, Maria Menado, Neng Yatimah	Drama	Malay Film Productions
Yatim Piatu (Orphan)	B. S. Rajhans	Yusof Latiff, Rokiah Jaafar, Saadiah, Haron Omar, Mariani	Drama	Malay Film Productions
1953
Ayer Mata (Tears)	K. M. Basker	Ahmad Mahmud, Rosnani Jamil, Siti Tanjung Perak, Habibah, Hashim Noor, Mustarjo		Malay Film Productions
Angin Berpesan (The Reminding Wind)	Naz Achnas	S. Kadarisman, Daeng Idris, Suki, Zeera Agus, Norani Moarti, Mohd Nor Lambak, Junaidah, Ahmad Shah, Saloma, Hamidar		United Malayan Film Company
Berbahagia Di-Singapura (Be Happy in Singapore)	Jaafar Wiryo	Siti Hanim, Rohaya, M. Amin		Keris Film Production
Budi Mulia (Personable)				
Buloh Perindu (Melodious)	B. S. Rajhans	Rosini, Shariff Medan, Bakaruddin, M. Amin, Momo Latiff		Cathay-Keris Film; First coloured film produced in Malaya
Chinta Abadi (Everlasting Love)	L. Krishan	Salleh Ghani, Maria Menado		Cathay-Keris Film
Dahlia	B. S. Rajhans	Shariff Medan, Baharuddin, Norsiah, Yem, Rosini		Cathay-Keris Film
Hati Iblis (Devil Heart)	K. M. Basker	Ali Rahman, Aini Hayati, Jamil Sulong, Salmah Ibrahim, Daeng Harris, Annie Jasmin, Aziz Sattar	Drama	Malay Film Productions
Hujan Panas (Rain Shower)	B. N. Rao	P. Ramlee, Siput Sarawak, Aini Hayati, Baby Zarinah, Haji Mahadi, Mustarjo, Hashim Nor, Malik Sutan Muda, Fatimah A	Drama	Malay Film Productions
Ibu (Mother)	S. Ramanathan	P. Ramlee, Neng Yatimah, Aini Hayati, Rosnani Jamil, Haji Mahadi, Nordin Ahmad, Salleh Kamil, Mustarjo, Johnny Tan, Johar, Adik Rahman, Adik Rosli	Drama	Malay Film Productions
Istana Impian (Dream Castle)	V. Girimaji	Ahmad Mahmud, Saadiah, S. Shamsuddin, Mariani, Neng Yatimah, Haji Mahadi, Omar Rojik, Salleh Kamil	Drama / Romance	Malay Film Productions
Kerana Kau (Because of You)	K. R. S. Sastry	Mohd Hamid, Mariam, Saadiah, Ahmad Mahmud, Omar Rojik, Daeng Harris		Malay Film Productions
Mangsa (Victim)	K. M. Basker	Yusof Latiff, Siput Sarawak, Ahmad Mahmud, Mariani, Salleh Kamil, Salleh Melan, Aziz Sattar		Malay Film Productions
Nelayan (Fisherman)	Jaafar Wiryo	Salleh Ghani, Umi Kalthum, Jaafar Wiryo		Cathay-Keris Film
Putus Harapan (Losing Hope)	B. N. Rao	P. Ramlee, Rokiah Jaafar, Musalmah, Nordin Ahmad, Salleh Kamil, Hashim Nor, Mariani, Hafsah, Osman, Hamid, Aini Jasmin, Aziz Sattar, Amran Alimin, Abbas Rahmat, Supatri	Drama	Malay Film Productions
Raja Sahari (Bridegroom)	B. S. Rajhans	Ali Rahman, Mariani, Daeng Harris, Saadiah		Malay Film Productions
Sangsara (Miserable)	S. Ramanathan	Yusof Latiff, Neng Yatimah, Siput Sarawak, Daeng Idris, Normadiah, Daeng Harris, S. Kadarisman	Drama	Malay Film Productions
Sehati Serasa	A. R. Tompel	S. Kadarisman, Rahman B, Salbiah Harun, Saloma, Daeng Idris		Nusantara Film
Shorga Dunia (Heaven on Earth)	B. S. Rajhans	Jaafar Shah, Rokiah Jaafar, Musalmah, M. Shariff		Malay Film Productions
Siapa Salah? (Who's Guilty?)	B. N. Rao	P. Ramlee, Daeng Idris, Siti Tanjung Perak, Neng Yatimah, Normadiah, Salleh Kamil, Haji Mahadi, S. Hassan Sahab, SM Malek, Hashim Hor, Omar Suwita, Boy Salleh, Salbiah, Marliah	Drama	Malay Film Productions
Untuk Sesuap Nasi (For the Sake of Food)	L. Krishan	S. Roomai Noor, R. Suriani, Mustapha Maarof, Raden Tuminah		Rimau Film Production
1954
Arjuna (Sweetheart)	V. Girimaji	Ahmad Mahmud, Rokiah Jaafar, Nordin Ahmad, Aziz Sattar, Aini Hayati, Daeng Harris, Mustarjo, Malik Sutan Muda, Raja Hamidah	Drama	Malay Film Productions
Abu Nawas	Cyril Randall	Nona Asiah, Ismail Kassim	Docudrama	Malayan Film Unit; A docudrama about the Communist threat during the Emergency years (1948 – 1960).
Chinta Abadi (Kembali Ke Desa) (Everlasting Love (Back to Countryside)	S. Roomai Noor, Sho Wee Gok, Jaafar Wiryo	Mislia, Salleh Ghani		Keris Film Production
Gelora Hidup (Turbulent Life)	B. N. Rao	Yusof Latiff, Rosnani Jamil, Musalmah, S. Kadarisman, Nordin Ahmad		Malay Film Productions
Iman (Faith)	K. R. S. Sastry	Ahmad Mahmud, Saadiah, Haji Mahadi, Neng Yatimah, Jins Shamsuddin, Ibrahim Pendek	Drama	Malay Film Productions
Insaf (Conscious)	B. S. Rajhans	Rosini, M. Noor Lambak, Osman Gumanti, Mala Ratina		Cathay-Keris Film
Jasa (Service)	S. Ramanathan	Yusof Latiff, Mariam, S. Kadarisman, Salmah Ibrahim, Ali Rahman, A. Rahim, Saadiah, Aziz Sattar, Ibrahim Pendek		Malay Film Productions
Kechewa (Disappointed)	S. Ramanathan	Yusof Latiff, Saadiah, S. Kadarisman, Mariam, Salmah Ibrahim, A. Rahim, Salleh Kamil	Drama	Malay Film Productions
Keluarga Tolol (Stupid Family)	S. Ramanathan	Aziz Sattar, Siti Tanjung Perak, Normadiah, S. Shamsuddin, Ibrahim Pendek		Malay Film Productions
Merana (Languish)	B. N. Rao	P. Ramlee, Latifah Omar, Siti Tanjung Perak, Mariani, Aini Hayati, Musalmah, Habsah, Daeng Idris, Mustarjo, Malik Sutan Muda, Omar Suwita, Baby Hamimah	Drama / Romance	Malay Film Productions
Nafsu (Lust)	L. Krishnan	S. Roomai Noor, Maria Menado, Osman Gumanti, Rosini, M. Amin		Cathay-Keris Film
Panggilan Pulau (An Island Calling)	S. Ramanathan	P. Ramlee, Normadiah, Yusof Latiff, A. Rahim, Nordin Ahmad, S. Kadarisman, Salleh Kamil, Latifah Omar, Ibrahim Pendek, Daeng Idris, Omar Rojik, S. Shamsuddin, Siti Tanjung Perak, Hashim Nor, Adik Rahman, Saamah	Drama / Romance	Malay Film Productions; Based on the novel Wuthering Heights by Emily Brontë
Pawang (Shaman)	K. M. Basker	Haji Mahadi, Rosnani Jamil, Daeng Idris, Omar Rojik, Musalmah, Hashim Nor, S. Shamsuddin, Jamil Sulong		Malay Film Productions
Perjodohan (Matchmaking)	B. N. Rao	P. Ramlee, Normadiah, Nordin Ahmad, Mariani, Aini Hayati, Siti Tanjung Perak, S. Hassan Sahab, Mustarjo, Zainon Ibrahim, Adik Johan		Malay Film Productions
Pertarohan (Betting)	L. Krishan	S. Roomai Noor, Maria Menado, Salleh Ghani, Wahid Satay		Cathay-Keris Film
Tangisan Ibu (Sorrowful Mother)	L. Krishnan	S. Roomai Noor, Mislia, M. Noor, Tuminah		Cathay-Keris Film
Terang Bulan Di-Malaya (Bright Moon in Malaya)	B. S. Rajhans	Raden Mokhtar, Rosini, Sukarseh, Bakarudin		Cathay-Keris Film
1955
Abu Hassan Penchuri (Abu Hassan the Thief)	B. N. Rao	P. Ramlee, Mariam, Nordin Ahmad, Mohd Hamid, Daeng Idris, Malik Sutan Muda, S. Shamsuddin, Ali Rahman, Shariff Dol, Wan Hazim, Habsah, Zaiton	Romance / Fantasy	Malay Film Productions; Based on The Thief of Bagdad
Bernoda (Stained)	S. Ramanathan	Yusof Latiff, Normadiah, Latifah Omar, S. Kadarisman, Nordin Ahmad, Siti Tanjung Perak		Malay Film Productions
Duka Nestapa (Great Sorrow)	L. Krishnan	S. Roomai Noor, Darasalam, Mislia, Nursiah K		Cathay-Keris Film
Empat Isteri (Four Wives)	B. S. Rajhans	Daeng Idris, Normadiah, Saloma, Latifah Omar, Mariani, A. Rahim, Salleh Kamil		Malay Film Productions
Gadis Liar		Ibrahim Pendek		
Insan (Human)	K. M. Basker	Omar Rojik, Siput Sarawak, Ahmad Mahmud, Saadiah, Latifah Omar, Malik Sutan Muda		Malay Film Productions
Irama Kaseh (Rhythm of Love)	Laurie Fredment	Nety Herwaty, Rosini, Mohd Nor Lambak, S. Roomai Noor, M. Amin		Cathay-Keris Film
Jubah Hitam (Black Robe)	S. Ramanathan	Yusof Latiff, Zaiton, S. Kadarisman, Daeng Idris, A. Rahim		Malay Film Productions
Kaseh Menumpang (Riding on Love)	L. Krishnan	S. Roomai Noor, Rosnani Jamil, Rosini, M. Amin, R. Suriani		Shah Film Production
Kipas Hikmat (Magic Fan)	S. Ramanathan	Yusof Latiff, Mariam, S. Kadarisman, Ibrahim Pendek, A. Rahim, Omar Rojik, Aziz Sattar, Zaiton	Fantasy	Malay Film Productions
Menyerah (Submissive)	K. M. Basker	Yusof Latiff, Latifah Omar, Siput Sarawak, S. Kadarisman, Ahmad Shah	Drama	Malay Film Productions
Mutiara dari Malaya (Pearls from Malaya)	Laurie Fredment	S. Roomai Noor, Mislia, Sri A Unety, M. Amin, Dollah Sarawak		Cathay-Keris Film
Penarek Becha (The Trishaw Man)	P. Ramlee	P. Ramlee, Saadiah, Salleh Kamil, Udo Omar, Saamah, Habsah, Omar Suwita, Zainon, Fatimah Osman, Mohd Hamid, Kemat Hassan, Shariff Dol, Hashimah Yon	Drama / Romance	Malay Film Productions
Ribut (Storm)	K. M. Basker	Ahmad Mahmud, Saadiah, Haji Mahadi, Rosnani Jamil, Habsah, Salbiah, Aziz Sattar	Drama / Romance	Malay Film Productions
Roh Membela (Spirit Guide)	B. N. Rao	Nordin Ahmad, Neng Yatimah, Daeng Idris, Normadiah, Haji Mahadi, Salleh Kamil, Aziz Sattar		Malay Film Productions
Saudara-ku (My Relations)	Laurie Fredment	Darasalam, Ahmad Shah, Maria Menado, Marsita		Cathay-Keris Film
Selamat Hari Raya	L. Krishnan	S. Roomai Noor, Maria Menado, Salleh Ghani, Umi Kalthum, M. Amin, Wahid Satay		Cathay-Keris Film
Selamat Tinggal Kekaseh-ku; Good Bye, My Sweethearts	L. Krishnan	S. Roomai Noor, Kasma Booty, M. Amin, Noly Lim, Cheng Li Li, Shariff Medan, Dollah Sarawak, Yunalis, Jaafar, Sri A Unety		Cathay-Keris Film
1956
Adam	S. Roomai Noor	S. Roomai Noor, Hasnah Rahman, Nursiah Yem, M. Amin, Umi Kalthum, Rahimah Alias		Cathay-Keris Film
Adek-ku; My Younger Brother	B. N. Rao	Ahmad Mahmud, Rosnani Jamil, Saloma, Haji Mahadi, Siti Tanjong Perak, Malik Sutan Muda, Omar Suwita, Mohd Hamid, Aziz Sattar	Drama	Malay Film Productions
Azan	L. Krishnan	S. Roomai Noor, Nursiah K, Shariff Medan, Salleh Ghani, Umi Kalthum, M. Amin		Cathay-Keris Film
Anak-ku Sazali (My Son, Sazali)	Phani Majumdar	P. Ramlee, Zaiton, Rosnani Jamil, Nordin Ahmad, Hashimah Yon, Daeng Idris, Habsah Buang, Malik Sutan Muda, Ibrahim Pendek, S. Kadarisman, Siti Tanjong Perak, HM Rohaizad, Kemat Hassan, Fatimah, Salbiah, Omar Suwita, Shariff Dol, Tony Castello, Habibah, Rahman, Idrus, Suriani	Drama / Family	Malay Film Productions; Entered into the 1957 Asia Pacific Film Festival
Dondang Sayang	L. Krishnan	Nursiah Yem, Mustapha Maarof, Hasnah Rahman, M. Amin		Cathay-Keris Film
Hang Tuah (The Legend of Hang Tuah)	Phani Majumdar	P. Ramlee, Saadiah, Ahmad Mahmud, Zaiton, Haji Mahadi, Daeng Idris, Yusof Latiff, Nordin Ahmad, S. Shamsuddin, Aziz Sattar, Hashim Nur, Siti Tanjung Perak, Mariani, Saamah, Salbiah, Mustarjo, Nyak Osman, Rahmah Rahmat, S. Sudarmaji, Omar Hitam, Salleh Kamil, Omar Suwita, Jaafar, Muhammad Hamid, Malik Sutan Muda, A. Rahim, Mustapha Maarof, S. Kadarisman, Mahmud June, Raja Hamidah	Historical / Drama / Action	Malay Film Productions; Second coloured film produced in Malaya; Entered into the 1956 Asia Pacific Film Festival; Based on Hang Tuah. First Eastmancolour film in Southeast Asia.
Ke'adilan Illahi (Divine Justice)	K. M. Basker	Yusof Latiff, Saadiah, S. Kadarisman, Daeng Idris		Malay Film Productions
Mega Mendong	L. Krishnan	S. Roomai Noor, Supatri, Mustapha Maarof, R. Suriani		Cathay-Keris Film
Penchuri (The Thieves)	K. M. Basker	Yusof Latiff, Siput Sarawak, S. Kadarisman, Siti Tanjung Perak	Drama / Romance	Malay Film Productions
Ribut				Third Malay color film in (Gevacolor)
Semerah Padi	P. Ramlee	Nordin Ahmad, Saadiah, P. Ramlee, Daeng Idris, Normadiah, Salleh Kamil, A. Rahim, Omar Suwita, Musalmah, Malik Sutan Muda, Saamah, Zainon, Kemat Hassan, Shariff Dol, Mohd Hamid, Nyak Osman	Drama	Malay Film Productions
1957
Badjau Anak Laut (Bajao, The Sea Gypsies)	Lamberto V. Avellana	Rosa Rosal, Tony Santos, Leroy Salvador, Joseph de Cordova, Vic Silayan, Oscar Keesee, Pedro Faustino	Drama	Cathay-Keris Film
Belantara	S. Ramanathan	Nordin Ahmad, Normadiah, Salleh Kamil, S. Shamsuddin, Daeng Idris, A. Rahman, Musalmah, Sureini Sani		Malay Film Productions
Bujang Lapok	P. Ramlee	P. Ramlee, S. Shamsuddin, Aziz Sattar, Normadiah, Zaiton, Dayang Sofia, Siti Tanjung Perak, Rohayu Maaji, M. Babjan, Saamah, Shariff Dol, Malek Sutan Muda, Prani Prawat, Nen Junainah, Rokiah, Kemat Hassan, M. Rafee, Bibah, Nyong Ismail	Musical comedy	Malay Film Productions
Hantu Jerangkong (The Skeletal Ghost)	Dhiresh Ghosh	Aziz Jaafar, Hashimah Yon, Habsah, Omar Suwita, Zainon, Aziz Sattar, S. Shamsuddin	Horror	Malay Film Productions
Kaseh Sayang	Phani Majumdar	Haji Mahadi, Neng Yatimah, Saadiah, Hashimah Yon, Jins Shamsuddin, Aziz Sattar	Drama	Malay Film Productions
Kembali Sa-orang (A Man Is Back)	Ramon A. Estella	Ahmad Mahmud, Saadiah, Salleh Kamil, Mariani, Daeng Idris, Sunatri, Saamah	Drama	Malay Film Productions
Mogok	K. M. Basker	Ahmad Mahmud, Saadiah, S. Kadarisman, Mariani, Daeng Idris, Siti Tanjung Perak	Drama	Malay Film Productions
Pancha Delima	P. Ramlee	Jins Shamsuddin, Hashimah Yon, Udo Omar, Haji Mahadi, Aini Hayati, R. Suriani, R. Juminah, Shariff Dol, Kemat Hassan, Ali Fiji, Mohd Rafee, Omar Suwita, Babjan, Zainon, Hassan Kadir, S. Ramanathan, Aziz Sattar, S. Shamsuddin, P. Ramlee	Fantasy	Malay Film Productions
Pontianak	B. N. Rao	Maria Menado, M. Amin, Wahid Satay, Salmah Ahmad, Karim Latiff	Horror	Cathay-Keris Film
Putera Bertopeng	K. M. Basker	Ahmad Mahmud, Normadiah, Daeng Idris, A. Rahim, S. Kadarisman, Haji Mahadi, Aziz Sattar	Drama	Malay Film Productions
Dendam Pontianak	B. N. Rao	Maria Menado, Mustapha Maarof, Wahid Satay	Horror	Cathay-Keris Film; Preceded by Pontianak (1957)
Rumah Panjang (Long House)	Phani Majumdar	Kevin Buchannan, Luli Gagat		Malay Film Productions. An Eastmancolour film.
Salah Sangka	B. N. Rao			Cathay-Keris Film
Seruan Darah	Chew Cheng Kok	Ahmad Mahmud, Neng Yatimah, Yusof Latiff		Malay Film Productions
1958
Anak Pontianak (Son of the Vampire)	Ramon A. Estella	Jins Shamsuddin, Hashimah Yon, Dayang Sofia, S. Kadarisman, Aziz Sattar	Horror	Malay Film Productions
Azimat	Rolf Bayer	Pancho Magalona, Saloma, Tita Doran, Ahmad Mahmud, Jins Shamsuddin, Salleh Kamil	Drama	Malay Film Productions
Che Mamat Parang Tajam	S. Roomai Noor	Wahid Satay, Salmah Ahmad	Comedy	Cathay-Keris Film
Chinta Gadis Rimba (The Virgin of Borneo)	L. Krishnan	S. Roomai Noor, Narang, M. Amin	Romance	Cathay-Keris Film; Coloured film
Doktor (Doctor)	Phani Majumdar	Aziz Jaafar, Zaiton, S. Kadarisman, Haji Mahadi, Aini Hayati	Drama	Malay Film Productions
Gergasi	Dhiresh Ghosh	Aziz Jaafar, Hashimah Yon, Rokiah Jaafar, Haji Mahadi, Aziz Sattar	Horror	Malay Film Productions
Hantu Kubor	Chew Cheng Kok	Aziz Jaafar, Hashimah Yon, S. Kadarisman, Aziz Sattar, S. Shamsuddin	Horror	Malay Film Productions
Ikan Duyong				Cathay-Keris Film
Kaki Kuda	Kirdar Sharma	Aziz Sattar, S. Shamsuddin, Normadiah, Saloma, Mustarjo, Ani Jasmin	Comedy	Malay Film Productions
Masharakat Pinchang (Imperfect Society)	Phani Majumdar	S. Kadarisman, Salleh Kamil, Tony Castello, Rosnani Jamil, Neng Yatimah, Daeng Idris, Haji Mahadi, A. Rahim	Drama	Malay Film Productions
Orang Lichin	L. Krishnan	S. Roomai Noor, Maria Menado, Mahmood June, M. Amin	Mystery / Horror	Cathay-Keris Film
Orang Minyak (The Oily Man)	L. Krishnan	S. Roomai Noor, Salmah Ahmad, Nordin Ahmad, Mahmud June, M. Amin	Horror	Cathay-Keris Film; Based on Orang Minyak
Sergeant Hassan	Lamberto Avellana, P. Ramlee	P. Ramlee, Saadiah, Jins Shamsudin, Salleh Kamil, Daeng Idris, Aini Jasmin, Kapten John Gray RMR, Kapten David Downe RM, Sarjan Pon, Koperal Rashid, Nyong Kamil, Leng Hussein, Omar Rojik, S. Shamsuddin, M. Rafee, Adik Jaafar, Kemat Hassan, Habibah, Omar Suwita, Zainol Bakar, Ali Fiji	Drama / Action	Malay Film Productions
Satay	K. M. Basker	Wahid Satay, Aidi Ali, Salmah Ahmad, Puteh Lawak	Comedy / Family	Cathay-Keris Film; Entered into the 1959 Asia Pacific Film Festival
Selendang Delima	K. M. Basker	Latifah Omar, Maria Menado, M. Amin, Abdullah Chik, Norsiah Yem	Drama / Fantasy	Cathay-Keris Film
Serangan Orang Minyak	L. Krishnan	M. Amin, Nordin Ahmad, Latifah Omar, Udo Omar, Wahid Satay	Thriller	Cathay-Keris Film
Sri Menanti	Phani Majumdar	Salleh Kamil, Zaiton, Chang Chong, Dong Tan, S. Kadarisman, S. Shamsuddin, Ibrahim Pendek		Malay Film Productions
Sumpah Orang Minyak (Curse of the Oil Man)	P. Ramlee	P. Ramlee, Salleh Kamil, Shariff Dol, Sri Dewi, Marion Willis, Daeng Idris, Haji Mahadi, Ali Rahman, Malik Sutan Muda, Salbiah, M. Rafee, Fatimah Osman, Rahmah Rahmat, Ahmad C, Raja Hamidah, Mustarjo, Nyong Ismail, Ahmad Ghani, Rokiah Hashim, Pranic Pramut	Fantasy / Horror	Malay Film Productions; Entered into the 1958 Asia Pacific Film Festival
Sumpah Pontianak (Curse of the Vampire)	B. N. Rao	Maria Menado, Mustapha Maarof, Salmah Ahmad, Shariff Medan, Puteh Lawak, Wahid Satay, Mat Sentol, Yem, Rahimah Alias, Aman Belon, Omar Hitam	Horror	Cathay-Keris Film; Preceded by Pontianak (1957) and Dendam Pontianak (1957)
Taufan (Typhoon)	T. C. Santos	Ahmad Mahmud, Zaiton, Salleh Kamil, Mariani, Omar Suwita, Nyak Othman, Saamah, Ibrahim Pendek, Aziz Sattar	Drama / Romance	Malay Film Productions
1959
Batu Belah Batu Bertangkup	Jamil Sulong	Aziz Jaafar, Zaiton, Neng Yatimah, Salleh Kamil, S. Kadarisman, Haji Mahadi, Rahmah Rahmat, Bat Latiff, Hasnah Hassan	Drama / Family	Malay Film Productions
Bawang Puteh Bawang Merah	S. Roomai Noor	Latifah Omar, Umi Kalthum, Mustapha Maarof, Siti Tanjung Perak, Aminah Yem, Shariff Medan	Fantasy	Cathay-Keris Film; Based on Bawang Merah Bawang Putih
Dandan Setia	Dhiresh Ghosh	Jins Shamsuddin, Saadiah, Aziz Jaafar, Normadiah, Rahmah Rahmat	Fantasy	Malay Film Productions
Hati Batu (Die-Hard)	M. Amin	M. Amin, Roseyatimah		Cathay-Keris Film
Jula Juli Bintang Tiga	B. N. Rao	Salmah Ahmad, Abdullah Chik, Wahid Satay	Fantasy	Cathay-Keris Film
Korban Fitnah (Victim of Slander)	P. L. Kapur	Maria Menado, Siput Sarawak, Sukarno M. Noor, AN Alcaff, Abdul Hadi, Syed Hassan, Izat Amir	Drama	Cathay Keris Film-Maria Menado Production co-production Screened at the 2003 Singapore Film Festival
Mahsuri	B. N. Rao	Kasma Booty, Nordin Ahmad, S. Roomai Noor	Period drama	Cathay Keris Film; Entered into the 1959 Asia Pacific Film Festival; Adaptation of Tunku Abdul Rahman's Mahsuri. Taken in Gevacolor.
Musang Berjanggut (The Bearded Fox)	P. Ramlee	P. Ramlee, Saadiah, Ahmad Nisfu, Udo Omar, Malik Sutan Muda, Nyong Ismail, Mustarjo, Shariff Dol, Habsah Buang, Kemat Hassan, Raden Sudiro, Momo Latiff, Babjan Jim, Zainon Fiji, M. Rafee, A. Rahim, Mahmood, Ali Fiji, Ahmad C	Comedy	Malay Film Productions
Nujum Pa' Belalang (The Fortune-telling of Pa' Belalang)	P. Ramlee	P. Ramlee, Bat Latiff, Hashimah Yon, Aziz Sattar, S. Shamsuddin, Ahmad Nisfu, Kemat Hassan, Shariff Dol, Udo Omar, Saamah, Habsah Buang, Malik Sutan Muda, M. Rafee, Mahmood, M. Zain, CE Hashim, Ibrahim Hasan, Ali Fiji, Busra	Comedy	Malay Film Productions; Entered into the 1960 Asia Pacific Film Festival
Pendekar Bujang Lapok (The Three Over-age Bachelor Warriors)	P. Ramlee	P. Ramlee, S. Shamsuddin, Aziz Sattar, Roseyatimah, Mustarjo, Ahmad Nisfu, Momo Latiff, Ibrahim Pendek	Action / Comedy	Malay Film Productions; Entered into the 1959 Asia Pacific Film Festival; Preceded by Bujang Lapok (1957)
Puteri Gunong Banang	Dhiresh Ghosh	Sri Dewi, Ahmad Mahmud, Hashimah Yon, Salleh Kamil, Kemat Hassan, S. Kadarisman	Drama	Malay Film Productions
Raden Mas	L. Krishnan	Nordin Ahmad, Latifah Omar, M. Amin, Siput Sarawak, Mahmud June, Siti Tanjung Perak, Shariff Medan, Umi Kalthum, Mustapha Maarof	Drama	Cathay-Keris Film; Based on Raden Mas; Entered into the 1960 Asia Pacific Film Festival
Rahsia Hati-ku (My Secret Heart)	Naz Achnas	Sharifah Hanim, Maznah Ahmad, M. Amin		Coloured film
Raja Laksamana Bentan	Jamil Sulong	Ahmad Mahmud, Normadiah, Aziz Jaafar, Rosnani Jamil, S. Kadarisman, Salleh Kamil, Haji Mahadi, Rahmah Rahmat, Aziz Sattar	Drama	Malay Film Productions; Based on the characters in the story Sultan Mahmud Mangkat Dijulang
Rasa Sayang Eh...	L. Krishnan	Wahid Satay, Dollah Sarawak, Kasma Booty, Salmah Ahmad, M. Amin, Yem	Drama / Comedy	Cathay-Keris Film
Samseng (The Thugs)	Ramon A. Estella	Jins Shamsuddin, Rosnani Jamil		Malay Film Productions
Saudagar Minyak Urat (Massage Oil Merchant)	Ramon A. Estella	S. Kadarisman, Normadiah, S. Shamsuddin, Aziz Sattar, Mariani, Saloma, Leng Hussein, Ibrahim Pendek, Ahmad Nisfu	Comedy	Malay Film Productions
