= Budak Lapok =

2007 film

- Directed by: Anwardi Jamil
- Produced by: Wafa Abdul Kadir
- Starring: Aziz Sattar; S. Shamsuddin
- Production company: Matahari Animation
- Release date: 13 October 2007
- Running time: 90 minutes
- Country: Malaysia
- Language: Malay

Budak Lapok is a 2007 Malaysian animated film. Based on the P. Ramlee film Bujang Lapok, the film premiered on 13 October 2007 and was directed by Anwardi Jamil. It became the first Malaysian animated movie released in six years since Putih in 2001.

== Plot ==
Ramlee, Ajis and Sudin are three kids who befriend one another in a small village called Kampong Sebatang Pinang. The three take part in a football game against defending champions Sekolah Kampong Semerah Padi led by naughty Sarip Dol. Meanwhile, the three boys are also planning to win the hearts of village lasses, Nani, Salmah and Eton, by taking part in the inter-school drama competition even though both Ajis and Sudin are fearful of appearing on stage. Things become complicated when both the drama competition and the soccer match fall on the same day. The three need to come out with a plan to be at two places at almost the same time.

== Voice cast ==
- Aziz Sattar as Pak Ajis
- S. Shamsuddin as Pak Sudin
- Mohd Hasrul Syafiq as Ramlee
- M. Hafidzuddin Mahmudi as Aziz
- Eric Fuzi as Sudin
- Shafique Danial as Sarip Dol
- Al-Rusydi as Komeng
- Abon as Wak Mustardjo
- Afiqah as Sal
- Isma Aliff as Osman
- Aqira Aqira as Sarimah
- S. Azli as Ahmad Nesfu
- Mohd Rahim Dalmia as Koc Mahmud
- Mawar Dina as Eton
- Jalil Hamid as Tok Penghulu
- Jasmin Hamid as Joyah
- Maizurah Hamzah as Cikgu Rokiah
- Vanida Imran as Emak Aziz/Normah
- Harith Jalil as Tanggang
- Jihan as Ibu Tanggang
- Nuralida as Nani
- Mat Over as Pak Mat Tempe
- Dian P. Ramlee as Emak Ramlee/Azizah
- Nasir P. Ramlee as Bapak Ramlee/Zakaria
- Syamir Sahak as Brahim
- Salbalqish as Ros
- Sathiyavarmaan as Ayam
- Sabri Yunus as Bapak Aziz/Sattar

== Production ==
Animation process of the film was made in Bandung, Indonesia.

== Release ==
Budak Lapok was released on 10 October 2007, during the Eid-ul-Fitr. It was a commercial failure.

The film was screened on Radio Television Malaysia (RTM) in 2010.
