= Gerak Kilat =

Singaporean action - thriller film

Jefri Zain - Gerak Kilat
- Directed by: Jamil Sulong; Kemat Hassan (assistant director)
- Written by: Jaafar Abdullah; Jamil Sulong
- Screenplay by: Jamil Sulong
- Story by: Jaafar Abdullah
- Produced by: Vee Meng Shaw
- Starring: Jins Shamsuddin; Sarimah; Salim Bachik; Salleh Kamil; Rahmah Rahmat
- Cinematography: A. Bakar Ali
- Edited by: H. R. Narayana; Hayat Harris
- Music by: Yusof B Kassim Masdor
- Production company: Malay Film Productions
- Distributed by: Shaw Brothers
- Release date: 1966
- Running time: 81 minutes
- Country: Singapore
- Languages: Malay language, English

Gerak Kilat (1966), or Jefri Zain – Operation Lightning, is a classic Malay spy thriller directed by Jamil Sulong and produced by Malay Film Productions under the Shaw Brothers banner. Starring the legendary Jins Shamsuddin as the suave secret agent Jefri Zain, often dubbed the "Sean Connery of Asia", Sarimah Ahmad, Salim Bachik and Salleh Kamil.

== Synopsis ==
When his fellow agent Ali is mysteriously killed during a mission, secret operative Jefri Zain is assigned to investigate. His search uncovers a dangerous underground organization led by the ruthless Commander G-Man, whose plans threaten national security. With the help of his allies Tina and Eddie, Jefri relies on his wits and an arsenal of ingenious spy gadgets to outsmart assassins, infiltrate enemy hideouts, and bring the villains to justice.

== Cast ==
- Jins Shamsuddin as Seargent Jefri Zain, 007 Singapore agent who investigates Gerak Kilat's mission
- Sarimah as Tina
- Salim Bachik as Eddie
- Salleh Kamil as Commander G-Man, antagonist who was operative of Operation Lightning
- Rahmah Rahmat as Ratna

=== Supporting cast ===
- Shariff Dol as Botak , Commander G-Man's follower and assistant
- Hashim Salleh as Ali , Jefri's informant who first died at the beach
- Ali Fiji as Commander G-Man's follower
- M. Rafiee as Commander G-Man's Follower
- Omar Suwita as Commander G-Man 's follower
- Sarban Singh as Commander G-Man's follower
- Margaret Clougher as Agent No. 4
- Sylvia Koh as Mei Ling
- Renee Richardson
- Rita Cheong
- Tony Richardson
- Sharifah Aminah

=== Additional cast ===
- A. Galak as Commander G-Man's Follower

== Success ==
This first Malay spy film was titled GERAK KILAT or OPERATION LIGHTNING in English. This film was first screened on 3 September 1966 and was warmly received by the public throughout Malaysia and Singapore. Jins Shamsudin has been given titles such as Singapore's Own Bond, James Bond of Malaysia and Sean Connery of Asia because he has successfully carried the character of Jefri Zain steadily. All the action movements in the film were done by him himself without using the services of stuntmen.

== Songs ==
- Jefri Zain singer Kartina Dahari
