= Zaharah Agus =

Malay singer and actress (1922–1978)

Zaharah Agus or Zara Agus (1922 – 26 March 1978) was a Malay singer and actress, well known in Malaysia during the 1960s and 1970s.

Agus' best-known role was that of the first wife of P. Ramlee in the film Madu Tiga. In the “Do Re Mi” film, Saloma made a cover of "Keindahan Bintang Malam" which was originally sung by Zera Agus. In the film, the song was shortened into Bintang Malam. The song "Mat Lodeh" which was popularized by Anita Sarawak was also originally performed by Zera Agus. The cover version by Anita in the 1970s was done with alternate lyrics.

Zaharah Agus has established a household with M. Suki, and her children, grandchildren and great-grandchildren, Noraini Muti, Nanu Baharuddin and Haneesya Hanee, have also dabbled in the arts.

Agus died on 26 March 1978, at the age of 55–56.

== Discography ==
- Malaya Merdeka
- Mat Lodeh
- Ikan Kekek
- Kalau Mau Kenal
- Tiang Agama
- Mas Merah
- Keindahan Bintang Malam (composed by Ahmad Nawab)
- Saya Cemburu

== Filmography ==
=== Film ===
Year	Title	Role	Notes
1953	Angin Berpesan		
1964	Madu Tiga	Latifah	
1968	Miang-Miang Keladi	Rokiah	
1969	Bukan Salah Ibu Mengandung	Ibu Agus	
