= Seniman Bujang Lapok =

1961 film by P. Ramlee

- One-sheet promotional poster.
- Directed by: P. Ramlee
- Written by: P. Ramlee; H. M. Rohaizad
- Screenplay by: H. M. Rohaizad
- Story by: P. Ramlee
- Starring: P. Ramlee; S. Shamsuddin; Aziz Sattar; Saloma; Zaiton
- Cinematography: A. Bakar Ali
- Edited by: Lee Thian Yak
- Music by: P. Ramlee
- Production company: Malay Film Productions
- Distributed by: Shaw Organisation
- Release date: 6 July 1961
- Running time: 120 minutes
- Country: Singapore
- Language: Malay

Seniman Bujang Lapok (English: The Nitwit Movie Stars) (or the original title in Malay is Bujang Lapok Jadi Bintang) is a 1961 Singaporean Malay-language black-and-white comedy film directed by P. Ramlee. It is the fourth instalment in the Bujang Lapok series of films, but the last to feature P. Ramlee, S. Shamsuddin and Aziz Sattar as the main trio of actors. However, it is not a direct sequel to the previous "Bujang Lapok" films, as there are no references to the events of the previous films.

The film is a self-referential spoof of the Malay film industry of the late 1950s to early 1960s. The plot revolves around the main trio attempting to become actors and break into the film business, and hence features a fictionalised look at the behind-the-scenes process of Malay film-making during that time. The line between reality and fiction is blurred as real film industry places are used, real film sets of previous Malay films are used for the film-within-the-film, and all the featured actors use their real-life names or derivatives thereof.

Almost all of the 7 original 35 mm reels kept by the National Museum of Singapore were deemed irreparable from damages cause by vinegar syndrome, but L’Immagine Ritrovata managed to salvage the last reel which covered the last 8 minutes of the film in 2017.

== Plot ==
The "Bujang Lapok" trio—Ramli, Sudin, and Ajis—head to Malay Film Productions in Singapore for an open-call audition. They accidentally disrupt the filming of Yatim Tua dan Setan Angkat Dulang, but the manager intervenes and introduces them to the on-site director, Ahmad Nisfu. The director reluctantly agrees to audition them but grows exasperated as they improvise their lines. However, their comedic talent impresses the studio boss, and they are surprisingly offered roles in an upcoming film.

The trio share a house with other tenants, each renting a room. Their first evening rehearsing scripts is fraught with disruptions: a couple dancing to loud music, a neighbor tinkering with a motorcycle, and a drunken trumpeter practicing loudly. The trio deal with each disturbance in their own comedic ways before resuming their rehearsal.

The next day, filming begins, but despite learning their lines, their antics frustrate the director to the point of collapse. While visiting him in the hospital, their well-meaning presence causes him to faint again. Back at home, Ramli grows closer to their neighbor Salmah, whom he admires. She tries to tell Ramli that Shariff Dol, a local bully and her longtime harasser, has proposed to her. Shariff Dol later confronts Ramli, taunting him until Ramli challenges him to a fight. After Ramli is found bruised and unconscious by Sudin and Ajis, the three friends share dinner together in solidarity.

The next day, Shariff Dol and his mother visit Salmah’s home to discuss wedding plans. Though Salmah disapproves, her mother reluctantly accepts Shariff Dol’s financial offer. That evening, Ramli expresses his desire to marry Salmah but laments his lack of money. Sudin offers him a "magic stone" he bought from a roadside vendor, claiming it will fulfill Ramli’s wishes. Ramli appreciates the gesture but remains unsure.

Later, the trio face more neighborhood antics, including a baby diaper dispute and a policeman’s intervention. The following morning, Salmah reveals to her mother that she has no intention of marrying Shariff Dol, citing his harassment. Furious, her mother returns Shariff Dol’s money. Humiliated, Shariff Dol vows revenge.

That evening, Salmah informs Ramli she has rejected Shariff Dol’s proposal and suggests using her savings for their wedding. Their joy is short-lived when they return home to find their house in flames. Salmah suspects Shariff Dol of arson. The trio rally the neighbors to track him down. Ramli finds Shariff Dol’s wallet at the scene, confirming his guilt. In the ensuing confrontation, Ramli defeats Shariff Dol in a fight. When the neighbors arrive demanding justice, Ramli persuades them to hand Shariff Dol over to the police.

The story concludes with the trio walking off into the moonlight, accompanied by their romantic partners, as harmony is restored.

== Songs ==
- Menchecheh Bujang Lapok
- Gelora
- Senandung Kasih
- Embun Menitik (by late Ahmad Patek)

The songs were sung by Saloma, P. Ramlee, S.Shamsuddin, Aziz Sattar, and Pancha Sitara band.

== Cast ==
- P. Ramlee as Ramli
- S. Shamsuddin as Sudin
- Aziz Sattar as Ajis
- Saloma as Miss Salmah
- Shariff Dol as Sharif Dol
- Ahmad Nisfu as Director Ahmad Nisfu
- H. M. Busra as Fat Trumpeting neighbor
- M. Rafiee as Loud Motorcycle neighbor
- Mariam Baharum as Auntie Salmah
- Nyong Ismail as Hang Kebun
- S. Kadarisman as Actor (Belacan scene)
- Hashimah Yon as Actress (Belacan scene)
- Kemat Hassan as Studio Manager Kemat Hassan
- S. Sudarmaji as Assistant Director
- A. Rahim as Extra Studio Actors
- Ali Fiji as Extra Studio Actors
- Mustarjo as Extra Studio Actors
- Ahmad C as Mr. Ahmad
- Pritam Singh as Mr. Singh
- Ahmad Mahmud as Doctor
- Ibrahim Hassan as Chief Police
- M. Zain as Indian neighbor
- Kuswadinata as Loud Music neighbor
- Hartinah Zainuddin as Timah
- K. Fatimah as Fatimah
- Aini Jasmin as Shariff Dol's mother
- Dayang Sofia as Dayang Sofia
- Zaiton as Zaiton
- Rahayu Sudarmaji (Ayu) as Ayu
- Leng Hussain as the Chinese Karung guni Man (Rag-and-Bone Man)
- Ahmad Chetty as Ring Stone Seller
