= Wahid Satay =

Singaporean actor (1930–2023)

- وحيد ساتيه
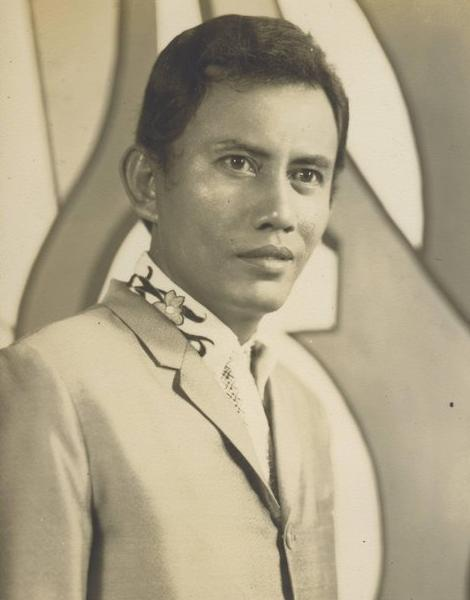
- Satay in 1962
- Born: Abdul Wahid bin Ahmad; 1930; Indragiri, Riau, Dutch East Indies (now Indonesia)
- Died: 22 May 2023 (aged 92–93); Singapore
- Resting place: Pusara Aman Muslim Cemetery, Lim Chu Kang, Singapore
- Other names: A. Wahid; Wahid Satay; S. M. Wahid
- Occupations: Actor; comedian; singer
- Years active: 1957–2005
- Spouse: Azimah Mohd Talib (m. 1953; died 1995)
- Children: 6

Abdul Wahid bin Ahmad (1930 – 22 May 2023), also known as Wahid Satay, A. Wahid or S. M. Wahid, was a Singaporean actor, comedian and singer.

== Early life and education ==
Wahid was born in 1930 at Indragiri, Riau, Sumatra, in the Dutch East Indies. and migrated to Singapore in 1935. He received his early education at the Geylang Malay School.

== Career ==
Prior to his acting career, he took painting, which was his hobby since his school days. Because of the quality of his paintings, Wahid was offered a job as a studio set painter at the Cathay Keris Studios at East Coast Road at the end of 1956. In 1957, director B.N. Rao needed a young comedian to be given a role in the film Pontianak. Rao noted that Wahid was always telling jokes to his co-workers and always making everyone on the set laugh, and thus decided to include him in Pontianak as a comedic role.

The role given to Wahid is the part of a satay seller (hence the stage name 'Wahid Satay', given by Cathay Keris Studios owner Loke Wan Tho) in a village where the people are afraid of Pontianak. Wahid so effectively acted the part of the satay seller that the scene became one of the most memorable scenes of the film Pontianak. The movie Pontianak created its own history when it broke Malay movie theatre records, with total takings of more than one million dollars, the highest amount then in 1957.

Following his huge success in Pontianak, Wahid was promoted from assistant painter to full-time actor with a three-year contract. Wahid was not only competent in the field of acting, but also singing. Besides his skills in front of the camera, Wahid also performed live shows to promote his films. Up to his death, Wahid still got many invitations to perform live on stage. During his Cathay Keris Studio days, Wahid represented his studios at the Asia Pacific Film Festivals in Tokyo, Manila and Hong Kong.

As an actor with Cathay Keris Studios, Wahid starred in numerous lead and supporting actor comic parts, which led him to be labelled "the Jerry Lewis of Singapore and Malaya".

Apart from his iconic comedic roles during the 1950s and 1960s, he also rose to fame with another comedic actor, Mat Sentul in the same period. Thus both of them were involved together in numerous comedy films of those eras such as Pak Pandir Moden, 2 Kali 5, etc.

== Personal life and death ==
In 1953, Satay married his wife, Azimah Mohd Talib, and they had six children. He became a widower when Azimah died in 1995.

Satay suffered from diabetes and heart disease. He died from complications of diabetes on 22 May 2023, at the age of 93. Satay was found dead on his bed by one of his granddaughters (on the maternal line) Mahirah Mohd Yassin. He was subsequently buried at the Pusara Aman Muslim Cemetery at Lim Chu Kang.

== Filmography ==
=== Film ===
Year	Title	Role	Notes	Ref
1957	Pontianak	Ali		
1958	Satay	Kamil		
1958	Serangan Orang Minyak	Baning		
1958	Sumpah Pontianak	Ali		
1958	Che Mamat Parang Tajam	Mamat		
1959	Rasa Sayang Eh...	Baning		
1959	Jula Juli Bintang Tiga	Kering		
1960	Pak Pandir Moden	Kulop		
1960	Che Mamat Parang Tumpul	Mamat		
1961	Sultan Mahmud Mangkat Dijulang	Awang		
1961	Sri Mersing	Jalak		
1961	Lela Satria			
1961	Gado Gado			
1961	Puteri Gunong Ledang			
1962	Chelorong Cheloreng	Cheloreng		
1962	Badang	Badang		
1962	Mabuk Kepayang	Hassan		
1962	Jula Juli Bintang Tujuh	Mertoh		
1962	Laila Majnun			
1963	Masuk Angin Keluar Asap	Wahid		
1963	Gul Bakawali			
1963	Gila Talak	Wahid / Wahab		
1964	Pontianak Gua Musang	Ali		
1965	Tiga Botak	Wahid		
1965	Muda Mudi			
1966	Naga Tasik Chini	Belitong		
1966	Anak Dara	Laba		
1966	Dua Kali Lima	Wahid		
1979	Mat Tenggek	Wahid		
1979	Dendang Perantau	Wahid		
1980	Tuan Besar	Tuan Wahid		
2004	Pontianak Harum Sundal Malam	Palace Officials	Cameo appearance	
2005	Senario XX	Tok Ketua		

== Awards and nominations ==
Year	Award	Category	Nominated work	Status	Ref
1966	Asian Film Festival	Best Comedian			
2007	Pesta Perdana	Lifetime Achievement Award	—N/a		
