= Hang Tuah (film) =

- The one-sheet for Hang Tuah
- Directed by: Phani Majumdar
- Written by: Buyong Adil; Jamil Sulong
- Screenplay by: Phani Majumdar
- Story by: MC ff. Sheppard
- Based on: Hikayat Hang Tuah
- Starring: P. Ramlee; Ahmad Mahmud; Saadiah; Zaiton; Haji Mahadi; Daeng Idris; Yusof Latiff
- Cinematography: N. B. Vasudev
- Edited by: H. R. Narayana
- Music by: P. Ramlee
- Production company: Malay Film Productions
- Distributed by: Shaw Organisation
- Release date: 28 January 1956
- Country: Singapore
- Language: Malay

Hang Tuah (English: The Legend Of Hang Tuah) is a 1956 Singaporean Malay-language historical drama film directed by Phani Majumdar. It is notable for the first Malay film to be fully shot in Eastmancolor. It was released in Singapore by Shaw Organisation on 28 January 1956. The film was based on the legendary Admiral Hang Tuah of Malacca and his 4 sworn brothers; Hang Jebat, Hang Kasturi, Hang Lekir and Hang Lekiu. This film received the award for 'Best Musical Score' at the 3rd Asian Film Festival in Hong Kong in 1956 and an official screening at 7th Berlin International Film Festival in 1957, where it was nominated for the Golden Bear.

== Plot ==
Tuah and his four closest friends, Jebat, Kasturi, Lekir, and Lekiu, showed their heroism as teenagers by defeating pirates at sea. As adults, they studied under Tok Guru Adi at Mount Ledang. During this time, Tuah met Melor, a native girl who shared a mutual affection with him. After completing his studies, Tuah and his friends returned to the Malacca Sultanate, with Tuah promising to wait for Melor if she sought him out in Malacca.

In Malacca, the group saved Bendahara Dato' Tun Perak from an angry mob while he was on his way to meet Sultan Mansur Shah. Impressed by their bravery, the Sultan appointed Tuah and his friends as warriors, sparking jealousy among dignitaries like Tun Ali.

Soon after, the Sultan traveled to Majapahit to marry Raden Mas Ayu, accompanied by Tuah and his companions. During a ceremony, Tuah demonstrated his skill by defeating the warrior Taming Sari and discovering that his opponent's strength lay in his magical keris. After Taming Sari's death, Tuah was awarded the keris, enhancing his power.

Later, Sultan Mansur Shah expressed his desire to marry Tun Teja, who was engaged to Megat Panji Alam. Tuah undertook a secret mission to Pahang to bring Tun Teja to Malacca. Meanwhile, Melor arrived in Malacca searching for Tuah but encountered Tun Ali and Pateh Karma Wijaya. She tricked them into thinking she was a palace handmaiden to escape their clutches.

In Pahang, Tuah's deception led Tun Teja to break off her engagement. However, on their return journey, Tuah revealed that his mission was to deliver Tun Teja to the Sultan. Though heartbroken, Tun Teja accepted her fate.

Back in Malacca, Tuah struggled between his loyalty to the Sultan and his love for Melor, who had become a palace handmaiden. On the persuasion of Dang Rani (under Tun Ali and Pateh Karma Wijaya’s orders), Tuah agreed to meet Melor. Their meeting was interrupted by the Sultan, who accused Tuah of treason for consorting with a palace handmaiden. The Sultan ordered Tuah’s execution.

Tuah’s sacred Taming Sari keris was given to Jebat, who succeeded him as a warrior. Jebat, however, saw Tuah’s punishment as unjust and vowed revenge. Melor, seeking justice for Tuah, attempted to assassinate Pateh Karma Wijaya with a kerambit during a performance but was killed by a guard.

Jebat rampaged through the Sultan’s palace, causing chaos and forcing the Sultan to flee to the Bendahara’s residence. Ashamed and regretful, the Sultan lamented Tuah’s execution, acknowledging him as the only warrior capable of defeating Jebat. Tun Perak then revealed that he had secretly spared Tuah’s life, hiding him in a prison cell. The Sultan immediately pardoned Tuah and summoned him back.

Tuah requested the Taming Sari keris to face Jebat, but the Sultan informed him that Jebat possessed it. Undeterred, Tuah confronted Jebat at the palace. Jebat tried to dissuade Tuah, claiming his actions were out of loyalty to their friendship. However, Tuah insisted on fighting. During the battle, Tuah was unable to harm Jebat due to the keris’s magic. Jebat, realizing Tuah’s determination, willingly exchanged kerises. Tuah then stabbed Jebat, who died in his arms.

Following Jebat’s death, the Sultan awarded Tuah the title of Laksamana. Although the people celebrated Tuah’s promotion, he mourned the deaths of both Melor and Jebat, questioning whether his unwavering loyalty to the Sultan was justified or if Jebat’s rebellion against injustice was the righteous path.

== Cast ==
- P. Ramlee as Hang Tuah
- Ahmad Mahmud as Hang Jebat
- Saadiah as Melor
- Zaiton as Tun Teja
- Haji Mahadi as Sultan Mansur Syah
- Daeng Idris as Dato' Bendahara Tun Perak
- Yusof Latiff as Tun Mat
- Nordin Ahmad as Hang Kasturi
- S. Shamsuddin as Hang Lekir
- Aziz Sattar as Hang Lekiu
- Hashim Nur as Adiputra
- Siti Tanjung Perak as Dang Merduai
- Mariani as Dang Rani
- Saamah as Dang Ratna
- Hashimah Yon as Javanese Dancer
- Mustarjo as King Of Majapahit
- Rahman Rahmat as Hang Tuah, during Childhood
- S. Sudarmaji as Ketua Orang Jakun
- Udo Omar as Tun Ali
- Malik Sutan Muda as Taming Sari
- Mustapha Maarof as Tun Zainal
- S. Kadarisman as Pateh Karma Wijaya
- Salleh Kamil as Orang Mengamuk 1
- A. Rahim as Orang Mengamuk 2
- Omar Suwita as Orang Mengamuk 3
- Ahmad C as Orang Mengamuk 4
- Nyak Osman
- H. M. Busra
- Mat Sentol as Pahang Palace Dancer

== Songs ==
- Berkorban Apa Saja, performed by P. Ramlee
- Joget Tari Lenggang

== Reception ==
Hang Tuah was released in many countries outside of Malaya, and won awards in Hong Kong. In Malaya, Hang Tuah faced disapproval from Malay activists because of what they perceived as pro-colonial sentiments in the film. The plot’s emphasis on its hero’s “blind loyalty” was criticized, as was its Indian and non-Muslim director, Phani Majumdar. Hang Tuah was not seen as Malay enough, because of what were perceived as particularly Indian elements to the film – particularly its musical sequences.

== Famous quotes from the film ==
Raja Adil Raja Disembah, Raja Zalim Raja Disanggah

Translation: "A fair king is a ruler to be obeyed, a cruel king is a despot to be revolted against."

Takkan Melayu Hilang di Dunia

Translation: "Never shall the Malay race vanish from the face of the Earth." This quote later became a renowned rallying cry for Malay nationalism.
