= S. Shamsuddin =

Singapore actor (1929–2013)

S. Shamsuddin س. شمس الدين
- Born: 1 January 1929; Pasir Panjang, Straits Settlements (now Singapore)
- Died: 4 June 2013 (aged 84); Jurong, Singapore
- Resting place: Pusara Abadi Muslim Cemetery, Lim Chu Kang, Singapore
- Other name: Pak Sudin
- Occupations: Actor; comedian
- Years active: 1948–2013
- Known for: Bujang Lapok film series
- Spouse: Puteh binti Esmoon (m. 1954–2013)
- Children: 7
- Parents: Dali bin Kechik (father); Khatijah binti Haji Ahmad (mother)

Shamsuddin bin Dali (Jawi: شمس الدين بن دالي), known professionally as S. Shamsuddin (1 January 1929 – 4 June 2013), was a Singaporean actor and comedian who appeared in Malayan films during the 1950s and 1960s.

== Early life ==
S. Shamsuddin or Pak Sudin as he was affectionately known, was born in Pasir Panjang, Singapore. His father, Dali bin Kechik was from Malacca, Malaysia, while his mother, Khatijah binti Haji Ahmad was from Geylang, Singapore. He previously worked as a labourer to help his family before he entered the acting profession.

== Career ==
One day, in 1948, he went to the studio Malay Film Productions (MFP) at Jalan Ampas just to see how filming works. His visit turned out to be a lucky one for him as he was given an opportunity to work as an extra in a film titled Chempaka directed by B. S. Rajhans. A few days later he sought work at the MFP, getting a job as a carpenter for studios and filming sets. Meanwhile, he also worked as an extra or dancer in films.

Eventually, he was given a role in a film titled Aloha, also directed by Rajhans. He acted in a few scenes that required a lot of dialogue, which is considered plenty for an extra or even new actor. His comedic role in the film acted alongside Osman Gumanti, Mariam, P. Ramlee, A. R. Tompel, and D. Harris, showed his talents in acting. More film offers continued, and Sudin eventually became a comedian staple of the Malay films of that era alongside Aziz Sattar, both appearing with successful actor P. Ramlee on numerous occasions, most notably in the Bujang Lapok series of films.

== Personal life ==
S. Shamsuddin married Puteh binti Esmoon in 1954, from which they had 7 children and 14 grandchildren. One of his children, Ariff Shamsuddin, also follows his footstep as an actor and comedian.

== Death ==
Following several years of poor health, S. Shamsuddin died at 10:56 in the morning of 4 June 2013 at the age of 84 at his residence in West Avenue 6, Bukit Batok and his remains were laid to rest at the Pusara Abadi Muslim Cemetery at Lim Chu Kang on 5 June 2013 at 11:00 am.

== Filmography ==
=== Film ===
Year	Title	Role	Notes
1948	Chempaka		
1950	Aloha		
1951	Sejoli	Bakar	
1951	Juwita		
1951	Penghidupan	Rahim	
1952	Aladdin		
1952	Sedarah		
1952	Jiwa Lara		
1953	Istana Impian		
1954	Pawang		
1954	Panggilan Pulau	Ombak (Pulau Kezambo)	
1955	Empat Isteri	Sulong	
1955	Abu Hassan Pencuri	Tengku Mahkota Basyrah	
1956	Hang Tuah	Hang Lekir	
1956	Pencuri		
1956	Keluarga Tolol	Sudin	
1957	Pancha Delima		
1957	Bujang Lapok	Sudin	
1957	Hantu Jerangkung	Sudin	
1957	Mogok		
1957	Putera Bertopeng	Sultan Shamsuddin	
1958	Kaki Kuda	Sudin	
1958	Sergeant Hassan	Chef (Platoon Singapore)	
1958	Sri Menanti		
1959	Pendekar Bujang Lapok	Sudin	
1959	Nujum Pak Belalang	Nyawa (literal translation: Soul)	
1959	Saudagar Minyak Urat	Bomoh Jampuk	
1960	Antara Dua Darjat	Sudin	
1961	Ali Baba Bujang Lapok	Kassim Baba	
1961	Seniman Bujang Lapok	Sudin	
1961	Si Tanggang	Lembik	
1962	Siti Muslihat	Jumaat	
1962	Batu Durhaka	Denak	
1962	Neracha	Doctor	
1963	Nasib Si Labu Labi	Boxing Referee	
1964	Mambang Moden	Sulaiman	
1964	Tiga Abdul	S. Shamsuddin Al-Haj	The narrator
1964	Siapa Besar	Pak Khatib	
1964	Dupa Cendana		
1965	Bidasari	Selabah	
1965	Dayang Senandong	Ngah (Cahaya Nila)	
1966	Dahaga	Bidin	
1966	Anak Buluh Betong	Tunggal	
1966	Aksi Kucing	Azmi	
1968	Ibulah Syurga		
1970	Aku Mahu Hidup	Mr. Bong	
1970	Puaka		
1970	Mat Karung Guni	Film Director	
1975	Keluarga Si Comat	Pak Sudin	
1979	Tuan Badul	Wak Sudin	
1981	Dia Ibuku	Pak Sohor	
1981	Setinggan	Sudin	
1981	Penyamun Tarbus	Sudin Pekak	
1981	Jejak Bertapak	Sudin	
1986	Bujang Lapok Kembali Daa	Sudin	
1989	Kolej 56	Father Rosli	
1991	Sepi Itu Indah	Pak Birat	
2005	Pontianak Harum Sundal Malam 2	Bapa Sitam	
2007	Budak Lapok	Himself (voice)	
2023	Syaitan Munafik	Pak Sudin	

=== Television movie ===
Year	Title	Role	TV channel
2008	Stok Lama		Astro Ria
2008	Tiga Menantu		Astro Prima

== Awards and nominations ==
Year	Award	Category	Nominated work	Result	Ref
1981	2nd Malaysia Film Festival	Best Comedian			
2005	Pesta Perdana in Singapore	Pingat Emas Perdana			
2009	22nd Malaysia Film Festival	Special Award for Veteran Male Actor	—N/a		
