= Ali Baba Bujang Lapok =

1961 film by P. Ramlee

- The one-sheet for Ali Baba Bujang Lapok
- Directed by: P. Ramlee
- Screenplay by: P. Ramlee
- Based on: Ali Baba
- Starring: P. Ramlee; Aziz Sattar; S. Shamsuddin; Ibrahim Pendek; Normadiah; K. Fatimah; Sarimah Ahmad
- Cinematography: A. Bakar Ali
- Edited by: HR Narayana
- Music by: Kassim Masdor; P. Ramlee
- Production company: Malay Film Productions
- Distributed by: Shaw Brothers
- Release date: 31 January 1961
- Running time: 122 minutes
- Countries: Singapore; Malaya
- Language: Malay

Ali Baba Bujang Lapok (English: Ali Baba the Old Bachelor) is a 1961 Singaporean Malay-language black-and-white comedy film directed by, written by and starring Malaysian silver-screen legend P. Ramlee and produced in Singapore by Malay Film Productions Ltd. Based loosely on the story of Ali Baba from 1001 Arabian Nights, the film is occasionally self-referential and contains elements of anarchic comedy, burlesque comedy, satire and farce. The title includes the suffix Bujang Lapok because it is the third instalment in the Bujang Lapok series of comedy films that star the trio of P. Ramlee, S. Shamsuddin and Aziz Sattar. This film marked the feature film debut of Sarimah Ahmad, who would go on to a long movie career, and is also notable as one of the few P. Ramlee films where he plays the villain.

== Plot ==
Ali Baba (Aziz Sattar) is a poor man who cannot succeed in life. He constantly sends his wife to his brother Kassim Baba's house to borrow flour so they can eat, but the stingy Kassim Baba (S. Shamsuddin) is frustrated at his brother and constantly reminds his wife, Norsiah, of Ali Baba's uselessness. When Norsiah comes to ask for flour for the umpteenth time, Kassim Baba loses his temper and lashes out at her sending her home in tears. She blames Ali Baba for putting her in the situation and blames him for not making an effort to seek a job. Ali Baba finally relents and goes out into the woods to gather firewood where he chances upon a group of 40 thieves marching through the woods carrying loot and treasures. He hides in a tree and watches their leader (P. Ramlee) stand in front of a cave and sings a verse of seemingly nonsensical words (niat ingsun matek aji semar ngising, actually a Javanese language poem) which causes an entrance to the cave to open. Ali Baba waits until the thieves have all left the cave before coming out of the tree and using the magic words to open the cave. Inside, he discovers a variety of riches and wealth, but only takes a box of gold coins.

With the gold coins, Ali Baba is able to pay Kassim back everything he owes and live in better comfort. Kassim Baba is overcome with curiosity and pesters Ali Baba to tell him how he suddenly came into wealth. Ali Baba eventually relents and tells Kassim about the cave and the magical verse to open it, but before he can tell him the verse to close the cave, or about the thieves who use it, Kassim Baba rushes off to find the cave.

Kassim, in his greed, tries to steal everything in the cave. The thieves return, find the cave door open and quickly close it. Kassim, who has forgotten the chant to reopen the door, is trapped and caught. Kassim tries to stall, but the thieves eventually kill him. When Kassim does not return home, Ali Baba sneaks out to the cave, where he finds his brothers' remains. He collects Kassim and has him sewn together by bribing the town cobbler, Apek, to do it.

The thieves eventually hear of Apek's strange "job", and identify Kassim Baba as the man they'd killed. The thieves plan to rob his house, which is now under the protection of Ali Baba. This attempt fails twice thanks to the interference of Marjina, Ali Baba's newest servant. The leader of the thieves, enraged by his men's incompetence, decides to look for the house himself. Once he has found it, he poses as an oil merchant visiting Ali Baba's house, while his thieves hide in oil jars that are kept in the courtyard. Marjina discover the hidden thieves and, with the help of Ali Baba's wife and widowed sister-in-law, pour boiling oil into all the individual jars. After all the thieves are defeated, Marjina attacks and kills the leader himself. Ali Baba, grateful for her loyalty, sets her free.

== Anachronisms ==
Although Ali Baba Bujang Lapok is filmed as a period piece set in an unidentified country with a Middle-Eastern look (though it might be Iraq, Baghdad), it is filled with deliberate anachronisms which are used for humour. Among them are the appearances of bicycles, motorcycles, trucks, a Vespa scooter, telephones and guns (especially a punt gun). When on leave, the 40 thieves also dress as various anachronistic characters, among them a cowboy, wig-wearing judge and a World War 2-era Japanese soldier.

In addition, the 40 thieves seem to function as a proper business, offering members health benefits, performance-based bonuses and overtime pay. Like the above anachronistic items, these are played for humorous effect (e.g. the leader of the thieves turns down a job because Sunday is a public holiday, and when the irate requester threatens to find other thieves the leader warns that if he does so the Thieves Union will take action).

Besides, the movie is also notable for mocking the legal status of cannabis and opium in then-British Malaya for humorous effect. It is shown in a scene where Marjina is buying some belacan at the city market, where the seller claims that selling cannabis and opium is legal but belacan is illegal, as it is smuggled from Malaya, even though the actual legal status for those three items in Malaya is the opposite and the words ganja and candu were muted out by shrimp paste smuggler.

The signs were also written in the Jawi script.

== Cast ==
- P. Ramlee as Abu Hassan, ketua penyamun (Leader of the Thieves)
- Aziz Sattar as Ali Baba
- S. Shamsuddin as Kassim Baba
- Normadiah as Aloyah
- Sarimah Ahmad as Marjina
- K. Fatimah as Norsiah
- Ibrahim Pendek as Sarjan (Sergeant; Thief Second-in-Command)
- Leng Husin as Apek Tukang Kasut (Chinese Shoe Repairman)
- A. Rahim as Penyamun Bin Momotarosan (Thief, son of Momotarosan)
- H. M. Busra as Penyamun Gemuk (Fat Thief)
- Shariff Dol as Orang Kaya Muflis (The Bankrupt Rich Man)
- M. Rafee as Penyamun Bin Rafee (Thief, son of Rafee)
- Ali Fiji as Penyamun Bin Fiji (Thief, son of Fiji)
- Sarban Singh as Penyamun Bin Singh (Thief, son of Singh)
- Kemat Hassan as Orang Kaya (Rich Man)
- M. Zain as Tukang Lelong Hamba Abdi (Slave Auctioner)
- Nyong Ismail as Tuan Tabib (Medicine Man)
- Zaiton as Penghibur Gundik (Harem Dancer)
- S. Kadarisman as Tukang cuci mayat (Mortician)
- Mustarjo as Hamba kedi (Transvestite Slave)
- Ahmad C as Bad Shoe Bandit
- S. Sudarmaji as Thief
- A. Galak as Thief
- Harun Omar as Thief
- Ramu Kechik as Thief
- Dek Wan Chik as Thief
- Hashim Salleh as Thief
- Ibrahim Hassan as Thief
- Darus Shah as Thief
- Ahmad Ghani as Thief
- Abdul Kadir Mamat @ Pak Kadir as Thief

== Songs ==
- Alhamdulillah Syukur Nikmat (Praise the Lord)
- Beginilah Nasib Diriku Yang Malang
- Hoi Hoi Yahoi! Lagu Penyamun (Hoi Hoi Yahoi! The Thieves' Song)
- Aiya! Cik Siti (Oh My! Miss Siti)
- Ya Habibi Ali Baba (Ali Baba, my dear)
- Alangkah Indah di Waktu Pagi (A Beautiful Morning), originally tuned from the Turkish folk song "Üsküdar'a Gider İken / Kâtibim".
