= Zaiton (actress) =

Singapore actress

- زيتون
- Born: Zaiton binti Abdul Hamid; 2 April 1937 (age 89); Lorong Engku Aman, Kampong Melayu Geylang Serai, Geylang, Singapore
- Other names: Zaiton Abdullah
- Years active: 1955–1968
- Known for: Hang Tuah; Anakku Sazali; Bujang Lapok; Ibu Mertua-ku
- Spouses: Abdullah Hussein (m. 1956; div. 1964) Syed Abdullah Alkaff (m. 1965; died 2017)
- Children: 5
- Awards: 3rd Asian Film Festival - Best Supporting Actress (Hang Tuah)

Zaiton Abdullah (born Zaiton Abdul Hamid; 2 April 1937) is one of the most popular and talented Malay film actresses during the 1950s and 1960s. Zaiton disappeared from the movie industry when Shaw Brothers's Malay Film Productions closed down.

== Filmography ==
=== Film ===
Year	Title	Role	Notes
1968	Raja Bersiong	Cindera	
1967	Lampong Karam		
1966	Kacha Permata	Azizah	
1966	Aksi Kucing	Azizah	
1965	Takdir		
1964	Siapa Besar	Maznah Senget	
1963	Budi dan Dosa	Hasmah	
1963	Korban		
1962	Gerhana	Nora	
1962	Ibu Mertua-ku	Kalsom Bee also known as Chombi	
1961	Seniman Bujang Lapok	Herself	Cameo appearance
1961	Si Tanggang	Kenanga	
1961	Ali Baba Bujang Lapok	Harem Dancer	Guest appearance
1960	Putera Sangkar Maut		
1960	Lela Manja	Lela Sari Dewasa	
1960	Pertarongan	Molek	
1959	The Golden Trumpet		Filipino film
1959	Batu Belah Batu Bertangkup	Melur	
1959	Samseng		
1958	Sri Menanti	Fatimah	
1958	Doktor	Noor	
1957	Bujang Lapok	Herself	
1957	Taufan	Fatimah	
1956	Anakku Sazali	Mahani	
1956	Hang Tuah	Tun Teja	
1955	Kipas Hikmat	Tengku Azizah	
1955	Abu Hassan Penchuri	Dayang	Guest appearance
1955	Jubah Hitam		

== Awards and nominations ==
The 3rd Asian Film Festival

Year	Film	Category	Results
1956	Hang Tuah	Best Supporting Actress	Won

Malaya Film Festival (FFM)

Year	Film	Category	Results
1956	Hang Tuah	Best Supporting Actress	Nominated
1958	Taufan	Best Actress	Won
1962	Gerhana	Best Actress	Nominated
1966	Aksi Kuching	Best Actress	Nominated

2006 Era Award

Year	Appreciation	Results
2006	Era Art Award	Won
