= Bujang Lapok =

1957 film by P. Ramlee

- Directed by: P. Ramlee
- Written by: P. Ramlee
- Screenplay by: P. Ramlee
- Story by: B. H. Chua
- Produced by: Run Run Shaw
- Starring: P. Ramlee; Aziz Sattar; S. Shamsuddin; Normadiah; Zaiton; Dayang Sofia
- Cinematography: A. Bakar Ali
- Edited by: HR Narayana
- Music by: B. Yusuff; P. Ramlee
- Production company: Malay Film Productions
- Distributed by: Shaw Brothers
- Release date: 30 November 1957
- Country: Singapore
- Language: Malay

Bujang Lapok (English: The Three Over-aged Bachelors) is a 1957 Singaporean Malay-language black-and-white comedy film directed and performed by P. Ramlee. This is the first installment of the Bujang Lapok series of films.

== Plot ==
This film depicts the lives of three bachelors and best friends Ramli, Aziz and Sudin. The three of them share a rented room in a house owned by a wealthy widow, Cik Normah. The movie chronicles their challenges in love and how they overcome it. Ramli and Cik Normah are attracted to each other but are always held back by inopportune timing. Sudin is in love with Zaiton, the daughter of a wealthy family next door and who must endure her overbearing mother's prejudices. Also in the movie is Sapiah, whom Cik Normah occasionally helps due to her troubles with her alcoholic gambler of a father. After one more incident which forces Sapiah to run away from home, she tries to drown herself in the river but is rescued by Aziz who then begins to spend a lot more time with her and they subsequently fall in love.

This movie was filmed in various parts of Singapore notably Punggol, Tanjong Changi, Geylang Serai, Kampong Melayu Malay Settlement (Eunos Crescent), Ulu Bedok, Balestier Road's (Jalan Ampas), Bukit Timah and depicts vividly how life was like back in the 50s and the challenges faced by people living in the 'kampungs' (villages).

== Cast ==
- P. Ramlee as Ramli
- Aziz Sattar as Aziz
- S. Shamsuddin as Sudin
- Normadiah as Normah
- Zaiton as Zaiton
- Dayang Sofia as Sapiah
- Siti Tanjung Perak as Mak Zaiton
- Rahayu Sudarmaji as Ayu
- M. Babjan as Bapak Sapiah
- Sa'amah as Mak Sudin
- Shariff Dol as Sharif
- Malek Sutan Muda as Tuan Manager
- Prani Pramat
- Rokiah
- Kemat Hassan
- M. Rafiee
- Norsiah Yem
- Habibah Haron
- Nyong Ismail
- Minah Yem
- Mahmud Hitam

== Production ==
The film is directed by Ramlee who was also part of the main cast.

- Assistants: S. Sudarmadji (Director), Yaakob Mahmud (Camera), Chua Soh Tong & P.V Jhon (Sound), K.K Raman (Editors), Kassim Masdor (Music)
- Story: B. H. Chua
- Continuity: Kassim Masdor
- Lyrics: S. Sudarmadji
- Orchestra: B. Yusoff
- Playback Singers: Asiah, Nen Junaidah, Normadiah, Jasni, P. Ramlee
- Sound Designer: Kamal Mustafa
- Art Director: Mustafa Yassin

== Songs ==
- Tunggu Sekejap (Opening Theme-Instrumental)
- Nak Dara Rindu
- Resam Dunia (Dunia ini Hanya Palsu)
- Kampung Nelayan
- Manusia
- Pengantin Bersanding

== Legacy ==
The film series had inspired the 2007 animation film, Budak Lapok.
