= Aziz Sattar =

Indonesian-born Malaysian actor (1925–2014)

Yang Berbahagia Datuk Aziz Sattar PJN
- عبدالعزيز ستار
- Born: Abdul Aziz bin Sattar; 8 August 1925; Pekalongan, Bawean Island, East Java, Dutch East Indies (now Indonesia)
- Died: 6 May 2014 (aged 88); Kajang, Selangor, Malaysia
- Resting place: Bandar Tun Hussein Onn Muslim Cemetery, Cheras, Kuala Lumpur, Malaysia
- Occupations: Actor; singer; comedian; film director; screenwriter
- Years active: 1953–2014
- Known for: Bujang Lapok film series
- Spouses: Siti Rumina Ahmad (divorced); Dayang Sofia (m. 1958; div. 1980) Datin Hashimah Delan (m. 2006–2014)
- Children: 7

Datuk Abdul Aziz bin Sattar (Jawi: عبدالعزيز بن ستار; 8 August 1925 – 6 May 2014) was a Malaysian actor, singer, comedian, and director who is mostly known for his roles in the black and white Malay films of the 1950s and 1960s.

== Early life ==
Aziz Sattar was born on Bawean island in Pekalongan Village, Gresik Regency, East Java Province, Dutch East Indies (now Indonesia) on 8 August 1925. When he was three years old, his family migrated to Singapore, where he grew up in the Pasir Panjang area. From there, he met and befriended Salleh Kamil and Shariff Dol, who would later go on to extensive movie careers similar to his own. His early education was at the Sekolah Melayu Kota Raja. However, he was unable to continue his education beyond the age of 11 due to the Japanese occupation of Malaya at the time.

By the time Aziz was 10 years old, he displayed talent as a natural comedian and entertainer, performing at local weddings and festivals in his village. In his early 20s, he worked as a lorry driver.

== Career ==
In 1952, Aziz and his two childhood friends were invited to work at the Malay Film Productions studio. Initially, he worked solely as a crew member. Later on in 1953, he was invited to join the supporting cast of the film Putus Harapan. More film offers continued, and he eventually became a comedian staple of the Malay films of that era, appearing with successful actor P. Ramlee on numerous occasions, most notably in the Bujang Lapok series of films.

== Personal life ==
Aziz married a total of five times. The first two wives were not widely known whilst the other two were publicly known namely the third with Siti Rumina Ahmad and fourth with Dayang Sofia, both of whom Aziz were divorced. On 16 December 2006, he married Datin Hashimah Delan in a high-profile affair that was covered extensively by the Malaysian media.

Aziz died on 6 May 2014 at approximately 02:00 am (MYT) in KPJ Kajang Specialist Hospital at the age of 88 due to heart disease. He was buried at the Bandar Tun Hussein Onn Muslim Cemetery in Cheras, Selangor after Zohor prayers.

== Honours ==
=== Honours of Malaysia ===
- Malaysia
  - Commander of the Order of Meritorious Service (PJN) – Datuk (2007)
  - Officer of the Order of the Defender of the Realm (KMN) (2002)
  - Member of the Order of the Defender of the Realm (AMN) (1987)

== Filmography ==
=== Film ===
Year	Title	Role	Notes
1953	Putus Harapan		Debut film appearances
1953	Mangsa		
1953	Hati Iblis		
1954	Jasa		
1954	Arjuna		
1954	Iman	Awang	
1955	Kipas Hikmat	Razid	
1955	Roh Membela	Amir	
1956	Ribut		
1956	Hang Tuah	Hang Lekiu	
1956	Pencuri		
1956	Keluarga Tolol	Aziz	
1957	Putera Bertopeng		
1957	Pancha Delima		
1957	Bujang Lapok	Aziz	
1957	Hantu Jerangkung	Aziz	
1957	Kaseh Sayang		
1958	Kaki Kuda	Aziz	
1958	Hantu Kubor	Ajis	
1958	Anak Pontianak	Ah Chee	
1958	Taufan	Aziz	
1959	Nujum Pak Belalang	Badan (liternal translation: Body)	
1959	Raja Laksamana Bentan	Sin Chew	
1959	Pendekar Bujang Lapok	Ajis	
1959	Saudagar Minyak Urat	Hamid	
1960	Sumpah Wanita	Labu	
1961	Ali Baba Bujang Lapok	Ali Baba	
1961	Seniman Bujang Lapok	Ajis	
1962	Siti Muslihat	Datuk Bendahara / Memanda Menteri	
1962	Labu dan Labi	Himself	
1963	Korban		
1963	Nasib Si Labu Labi	Tok Kadi	
1963	Pilih Menantu	Aziz	
1964	Jeritan Batin		
1964	Siapa Besar	Busu bin Tengkorak Raja	
1964	Mambang Moden	Ismail	
1965	Taqdir	Gelam	
1965	Pusaka Pontianak	Kamarudin	
1966	Aksi Kuching	Selamat	
1968	Ibulah Syurga		
1975	Keluarga Si Comat	Pak Comot	Also as director and writer
1979	Prebet Lapok	Aziz Lapok	Also as director and writer
1979	Si Badol		Also as director and writer
1981	Penyamun Tarbus	Aziz Rabun	Also as director and writer
1981	Da Di Du	Orang Tua	Also as director and writer
1981	Setinggan	—	Also as director and writer
1982	Kami	—	Also as executive producer
1983	Darah Satria	—	As director and writer
1984	Tujuh Biang Keladi	—	As director and writer
1985	Bujang Lapok Kembali Daa	Aziz	As director and writer
1988	Jiran	—	As director and writer
1988	Perawan Malam		As director and writer
1989	Tak Kisahlah Beb		As director and writer
1990	Adik		As director and writer
1990	Orang Kampung Otak Kimia		
1991	Juara	Sudin	
1991	Suci Dalam Debu		
1992	Gelora Cinta	—	As director and writer
1992	Queen Control		
1992	Abang 92	Wan Mat	
1993	Tarik-Tarik		
1994	Simfoni Duniaku ...		As director and writer
1996	Suami, Isteri Dan ... ?		
1997	Layar Lara		
1998	Jibon	Tok Batin	
2002	Embun	Pak Mail	
2002	Soalnya Siapa?	Dato' Johar	
2004	Pontianak Harum Sundal Malam	Tok Selampit	
2004	Father		Also as co-director
2005	Maaria	—	Also as co-director
2005	Pontianak Harum Sundal Malam II	Tok Selampit	
2006	Cicak-Man	Minister	
2007	Budak Lapok	Himself (voice)	
2007	Anak Halal	Pak Ali	
2009	Setem	Pak Ramli	
2009	Momok The Movie	Pak Ajis	
2009	Duhai Si Pari-Pari	Pak Ajis	
2010	Kecoh Betul	Pak Aziz	
2012	Untuk Tiga Hari	Tok Kadi	
2014	Terbaik Dari Langit	Berg's Grandpa	His last film, posthumous released
2016	Radhi Ruby Bin Dadu	Cik Amat	His last film, posthumous released

=== Television series ===
Year	Title	Role	Notes
2000	Kelab Malam		
2000–2002	Abang Sidi	Abang Sidi (voice)	
2007	Manjalara	Tok Kamal	
2008	Ali Din	Syekh Mahfuz	
2008	Bilik No. 13	Pakcik	Episode: "Karipap"
2009	Keliwon (Season 2)	Pak Abu	Episode: "Hantu Geweh"
2010	Bujang Sepah Lalalitamplom (Season 1)	Pak Long Mustar	
2012	Kias Ramadan	Pak Wahab	Episode: "Terminal Kasih"
2012	Cinta Alif Ba Ta	Pak Deris	Special appearance
2012	Upin & Ipin (Season 6)	Himself (voice)	Episode: "Memories of the Soul"

=== Television movie ===
Year	Title	Role	Notes
1994	Ratu Jamu		
2001	Momok	Pak Ajis	
2002	Tuan Rumah		
2002	Menanti Hujan Teduh		As director
2003	Aisah 50 Sen	Aisah's Father	
2003	Neon		Cameo
2004	Pontianak DOT3: 2ND Jibam		
2005	Janji Rock		
2005	Sekeras Kerikil	Pak Derus	
2005	Sutun		Special appearance
2008	Stok Lama		As director
2011	Mariam Anisa		
2011	Arahan Pertama		
2012	50:50		
