= P. Ramlee filmography =

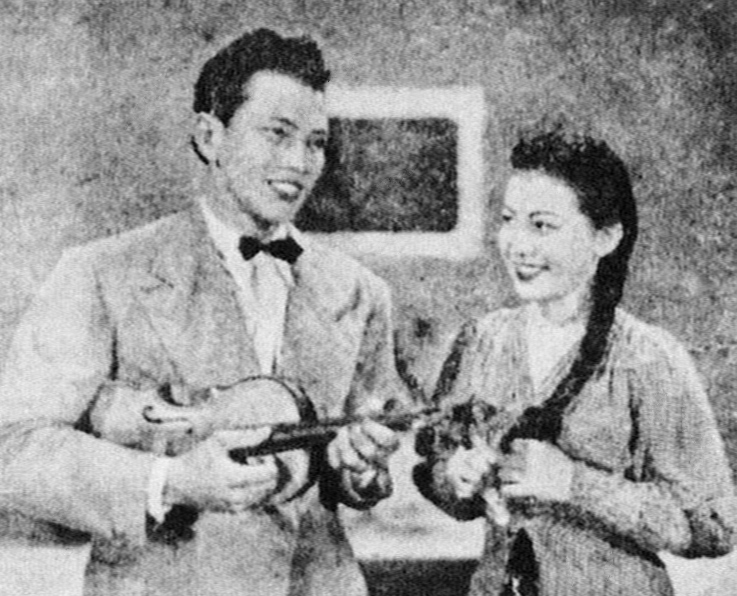
- P. Ramlee with Kasma Booty
- Film: 83
- Television: 4

The following is a list of P. Ramlee (22 March 1929 – 29 May 1973) films, in alphabetical order; it is also sortable by other criteria. Also indicated is whether P. Ramlee acted in, directed, wrote, or composed (or arranged) music for each film.

== Film ==
Year	Title	Credited as				Role	Notes
Year	Title	Actor	Director	Writer	Composer	Role	Notes
1948	Chinta	Yes	No	No	No	Putar	
1949	Noor Asmara	Yes	No	No	No	Pemain Muzik	Special appearance
1949	Nasib	Yes	No	No	No	Baki	
1949	Nilam	Yes	No	No	No	Datuk Bandar Rashid	
1950	Aloha	Yes	No	No	No	Banjo	
1950	Rachun Dunia	Yes	No	No	No	Harun	
1950	Bakti	Yes	No	No	No	Nasir	
1950	Pembalasan	No	No	No	Yes	—N/a	
1950	Takdir Ilahi	Yes	No	No	No	Dato Muda Arshad	
1951	Penghidupan	Yes	No	No	No	Salim	
1951	Sejoli	Yes	No	No	No	Leftenan Jamil	
1951	Juwita	Yes	Yes	Dialog	Senikata	Ramlee	as assistant director
1951	Derita	No	No	No	Yes	—N/a	
1952	Antara Senyum dan Tangis	Yes	No	No	Senikata	Abidin	
1952	Anjoran Nasib	Yes	No	No	No	Bahar	
1952	Patah Hati	Yes	No	No	No	Kasim	
1952	Sedarah	Yes	No	No	No	Harun	
1952	Miskin	Yes	No	No	Yes	Kamil	
1953	Chemburu	No	No	Dialog	Senikata	—N/a	
1953	Istana Impian	No	No	No	Yes	—N/a	
1953	Putus Harapan	Yes	No	No	No	Yusuf	
1953	Ibu	Yes	No	No	Yes	Remy	
1953	Hujan Panas	Yes	No	No	Yes	Amir	
1953	Siapa Salah?	Yes	No	No	Yes	Jamil	
1954	Panggilan Pulau	Yes	No	No	Yes	Zulkifli	
1954	Merana	Yes	No	No	No	Amir	
1954	Perjodohan	Yes	No	No	Yes	Rashid	
1955	Abu Hassan Penchuri	Yes	No	No	Yes	Abu Hassan	
1955	Penarek Becha	Yes	Yes	Yes	Yes	Amran	
1955	Empat Isteri	No	No	No	Yes	—N/a	
1956	Hang Tuah	Yes	No	No	Yes	Hang Tuah	
1956	Semerah Padi	Yes	Yes	Yes	Yes	Aduka	
1956	Anak-ku Sazali	Yes	No	No	Yes	Hassan / Sazali	
1957	Belantara	Yes	No	No	Yes	Salah seorang kelasi kapal (special appearance)	
1957	Pancha Delima	Yes	Yes	Yes	Yes	Pencerita (suara penyair) dan Pengawal Istana Permaisuri Cemara Jingga (babak dipotong)	Special appearance
1957	Bujang Lapok	Yes	Yes	Yes	Yes	Ramli	
1958	Sumpah Orang Minyak	Yes	Yes	Yes	Yes	Si Bongkok / Teruna Impian / Orang Minyak	
1958	Sergeant Hassan	Yes	Yes	Yes	Yes	Sergeant Hassan	as assistant director
1959	Pendekar Bujang Lapok	Yes	Yes	Yes	Yes	Ramli bin Puteh (Ramli)	
1959	Musang Berjanggut	Yes	Yes	Yes	Yes	Tun Nilam Utama	
1959	Nujum Pak Belalang	Yes	Yes	Yes	Yes	Pak Belalang	
1959	Puteri Gunong Banang	No	No	No	Yes	—N/a	
1959	Saudagar Minyak Urat	No	No	No	Yes	—N/a	
1959	Batu Belah Batu Bertangkup	No	No	No	Yes	—N/a	
1960	Antara Dua Darjat	Yes	Yes	Yes	Yes	Ghazali	
1960	Sumpah Wanita	No	No	Cerita	Yes	—N/a	
1960	Megat Terawis	No	No	No	Senikata	—N/a	
1960	Isi Neraka	No	No	No	Yes	—N/a	
1961	Ali Baba Bujang Lapok	Yes	Yes	Yes	Yes	Abu Hassan (ketua penyamun)	
1961	Seniman Bujang Lapok	Yes	Yes	Cerita	Yes	Ramli	
1961	Si Tanggang	No	No	No	Ragaman	—N/a	
1961	Singapura Dilanggar Todak	No	No	No	Penyusun	—N/a	
1961	Sri Tanjung	No	No	No	Ragaman	—N/a	
1962	Ibu Mertua-ku	Yes	Yes	Yes	Yes	Kassim Selamat bin Osman Selamat / Osman Jailani	
1962	Gerhana	No	No	No	Yes	—N/a	
1962	Labu dan Labi	Yes	Yes	Yes	Yes	Labi bin Kura-Kura / Majistret Labi / Harimau / Sheriff Labi / Dirinya sendiri	
1962	Siti Muslihat	No	No	No	Ragaman	—N/a	
1963	Love Parade	Yes	No	No	No	Singer	Special appearance
1963	Nasib Si Labu Labi	Yes	Yes	Yes	Yes	Labi	
1963	Kasih Tanpa Sayang	No	No	No	Ragaman	—N/a	
1963	Pilih Menantu	No	No	No	Ragaman	—N/a	
1964	Madu Tiga	Yes	Yes	Yes	Yes	Jamil	
1964	Melanchong Ka Tokyo	Yes	No	No	Yes	Singer	Special appearance
1964	Tiga Abdul	Yes	Yes	Yes	Yes	Abdul Wahub	
1964	Sitora Harimau Jadian	Yes	Yes	Yes	Yes	Dr. Effendi	
1964	Ragam P. Ramlee	Yes	Yes	Yes	Yes	Penyanyi / Ramlee / Damaq	Bahagian dalam segmen Muzikal, Mintak Nombor Ekor & Damaq
1965	Masam-Masam Manis	Yes	Yes	Yes	Yes	Cikgu Shaari Suleiman	
1965	Dajal Suchi	Yes	No	No	Yes	Singer	Special appearance
1965	Bumiputra	No	No	No	Yes	—N/a	
1966	Sabarudin Tukang Kasut	Yes	Yes	Yes	Yes	Sabarudin	
1966	Do Re Mi	Yes	Yes	Yes	Yes	Do (Masdo)	
1966	Nasib Do Re Mi	Yes	Yes	Yes	Yes	Do	
1967	Sesudah Suboh	Yes	Yes	No	Yes	Ariffin Mahmud	
1967	Keluarga 69	Yes	Yes	Yes	Yes	Osman Bakar	
1968	Ahmad Albab	Yes	Yes	Yes	Yes	Syawal	
1968	Anak Bapak	Yes	Yes	Yes	Yes	Harun	
1968	Gerimis	Yes	Yes	Yes	Yes	Kamal	
1969	Bukan Salah Ibu Mengandong	Yes	No	No	No	Zainuddin	
1969	6 Jahanam	Yes	Yes	Yes	Yes	Tantari	
1969	Kanchan Tirana	Yes	Yes	Yes	Yes	Pendekar Tirana	
1969	Tunggal	No	No	No	Yes	—N/a	
1970	Dr. Rushdi	Yes	Yes	Yes	Yes	Dr. Rushdi	
1970	Di-Belakang Tabir	Yes	No	No	No	ASP Azman	
1970	Gelora	Yes	Yes	Dialog	Yes	Rozaimi	
1971	Jangan Tinggal Daku	Yes	Yes	Yes	No	Datuk Mahmud	
1971	Putus Sudah Kaseh Sayang	Yes	Yes	Yes	Yes	Rostam	
1972	Laksamana Do Re Mi	Yes	Yes	Yes	Yes	Do	

== Television ==
Year	Title	Role	TV channel	Notes
1970	Intan	Jamal	TV1	
1972	Ranjau Selamat		TV1	
1972	Bakat TV RTM	Himself (jury)	TV1	
2010	Biography: P. Ramlee	Himself	History	Documentary
