= List of Malaysian films of the 1970s =

This is a list of films produced in Malaysia ordered by year of release in the 1970s.

For an alphabetical listing of Malaysian films see Category:Malaysian films.

NOTE: All title were originally released in the Malay Language unless otherwise stated with an *; all titles within quotes are translated to English from Malay. Titles within "<, >" are translated from Indonesian to English.

Title	Director	Cast	Genre	Notes
1970
Di Belakang Tabir(Behind the Scene)	Jins Shamsudin	Jins Shamsudin, P. Ramlee, Noor Azizah, Hussein Abu Hassan, Ali Rahman, Monica Jones	Drama Romance Crime	
Aku Mahu Hidup(I want to live)	M. Amin	Kuswadinata, Malik Selamat, S. Shamsuddin, Ani Jaafar, Salleh Melan, Saamah, Siti Tanjung Perak, Dollah Dagang, Hashim Salleh, Noor Kuda	Drama	Cathay-Keris Film
Asmara Kirana(Kirana's Romance)	Naz Achnas	Ed Osmera, Sharifah Hanim		Merdeka Film Productions
Dr. Rushdi	P. Ramlee	P. Ramlee, Sarimah, Sophia Ibrahim, Ed Osmera, Ismail Mahmud, Ibrahim Joned, Noor Azizah, Idris Hashim, Tony Azman, Wan Harun, Tamam Idris, Abdullah Ismail, Yusoff Bujang, Ahmad Dadida, Saloma	Drama / Mystery / Romance	Merdeka Film Productions
Gelora(Turmoil) < Surge >	P. Ramlee	P. Ramlee, Sarimah, Arman Yadi, Idris Hashim, Ahmad Dadida, Minah Hashim, Norsiati, Minah Yem, Sharif Baboo, Isma Rubee, Mariati Abdul Rahman, Bob Mustafa, Adik S. Noraini, Adik Zuraidah Sulaiman	Drama Mystery Romance|| Merdeka Film Productions	
Kembang Layu(Flowers)	S. Kadarisman	Ed Osmera, Noor Azizah, Noran Nordin, Hussein Abu Hassan, Norlia, Ribut, S. Kadarisman		Merdeka Film Productions
Kudrat(Power)	S. Kadarisman	Ed Osmera, Sarimah, S. Kadarisman		Merdeka Film Productions
Lobang Nuraka(Hell Hole)	Nordin Ahmad	Kuswadinata, S. Noni, Rahmah Rahmat, Malik Selamat, Ahmad Nisfu		Cathay-Keris Film
Mat Karong Guni	Mat Sentol	Mat Sentol, E. Daud, Kalthum Jaafar, Normadiah, Dollah Sarawak, Momo Latiff, Ahmad Nisfu	Comedy	Cathay-Keris Film
Onna Gokuakuchō	Kazuo Ikehiro	Michiyo Yasuda, Shin Kishida, Kei Satō, Masakazu Tamura, Hōshei Komatsu	Drama / Action	Daiei Film
Pancha Indera Harimau Berantai	S. Kadarisman	Ed Osmera, Mariati, Hussein Abu Hassan, Norma, Nasir Ramlee, Tamam Idris	Action	Merdeka Film Productions
Pedang Sakti(Satki Sword)	S. Sudarmaji			Merdeka Film Productions
Perintah Seri Paduka(Your Majesty's Order)	S. Kadarisman	S. Kadarisman, Hussein Abu Hassan, Noor Azizah, Arman Yadi, Alen Hoon		Merdeka Film Productions
Puaka(Tribe)	M. Amin	Aziz Jaafar, Ed Osmera, Mariati, Ahmad Nisfu	Drama / Mystery	Cathay-Keris Film
Tuah Badan(Body Luck)	Omar Rojik	Ed Osmera, Sarimah, Umi Kalthum, Ismail Mahmud		Merdeka Film Productions
1971
Angkara(Crime)	Omar Rojik	Ed Osmera, Sarimah, Tamam Idris		Merdeka Film Productions
Belang Pertanda(Omen Strikes)	S. Sudarmaji	Ismail Mahmud, Sharifah Hanim		Merdeka Film Productions
Dosa Remaja(Teenage Prayer)	Naz Achnas	Eddie Rushdja, Mariati, Karim Sirat		Merdeka Film Productions
Durjana(Criminal)	Omar Rojik	Ed Osmera, Hussein Abu Hassan, Nor Azizah, Norsiati	Crime / Thriller	Merdeka Film Productions
Jahanam(Hell)	M. Amin	Nordin Ahmad, Shariff Dol, Adifa Es, Saadiah, Dollar Sarawak	Drama	Cathay-Keris Film
Jangan Tinggal Daku	P. Ramlee	P. Ramlee, Noor Azizah, Ismail Mahmud, R. Suriani Jaafar, Norsiati Omar, Sonny Abdullah, Idris Hashim, HS Zamilah, Osman Botan, Dinda Sumantri, Karim Siraji, Mustaffa Sutan, Kamal Herman, Ismail Bond, Wan Haron, Peter Hashim, Ahmad B, Rafidah Bakhtiar, Ebby Saifullah	Drama	Merdeka Film Productions
Manusia Derhaka	M. Amin			Cathay-Keris Film
Mat Magic	Mat Sentol	Mat Sentol	Comedy	Cathay-Keris Film
Putus Sudah Kaseh Sayang	P. Ramlee	P. Ramlee, Latifah Omar, Bob Mustaffa, Mariani, AK Jailani, Hashim, Idris Hashim, Minah Hashim, Norizan, Edah Jailani, Mak Enon	Drama	Merdeka Film Productions
Samusim Di Neraka (A Season in Hell)	M. Amin	Tony Kassim, S. Noni, Mustapha Maarof		Cathay-Keris Film
1972
Chengkaman Maut	S. Sudarmaji	Ed Osmera, Hussein Abu Hassan		Merdeka Film Productions
Dara-Kula	Mat Sentol	Ahmad Jais, Rosnita Osman		Cathay-Keris Film
Darah Panglima	S. Kadarisman	Faizal Hussein		Merdeka Film Productions
Kelana	S. Kadarisman	Hussein Abu Hassan, Norizan, Faizal Hussein		Merdeka Film Productions
Laksamana Do Re Mi	P. Ramlee	P. Ramlee, A. R. Tompel, Ibrahim Din, Dayang Sulu, Hussein Abu Hassan, Mak Enon, Osman Botak, Bakar Kerinting, Norizan, Osman Ismail, Idris Hashim, Minah Yem, Ainon Chik, Zaiton Salleh, Yusof Haslam	Comedy Adventure Fantasy|| Merdeka Film Productions	
Pendekar Sakti	S. Kadarisman	Hussein Abu Hassan, Tamam Idris, Latiff Borgiba, Indera Azman		Merdeka Film Productions
Pengejaran Ke Neraka	M. Amin			Cathay-Keris Film
Semangat Ular	M. Amin	Mustapha Maarof		Cathay-Keris Film
1973
Bunga Mas	Naz Achnas	Ed Osmera, Sharifah Hanim, Tony Azman, Zamilla		Merdeka Film Productions
Dara Kula	Mat Sentol			Cathay-Keris Film
Harimau Jadian	M. Amin			Cathay-Keris Film
Hati Batu	M. Amin	Latifah Omar, S. Azam, Hasnah Harun, Fauziah Ahmad Daud, Faizal Ahmad Daud, Salleh Melan, M. Shahdan, Rahmah Latiff, Siti Tanjung Perak		Cathay-Keris Film
Penyamun Si Bongkok	M. Amin	Dali Siliwangi, Sharifah Hanim, Tony Azman, Faizal Hussein		Merdeka Film Productions
Raktha Paei (The blood-ghost)	Malaysia Vasudevan	Kalaikumar Chinnasamy, Malaysia Vasudevan	Horror	Black and white. First Malaysian Tamil languaged film.
Satria	S. Kadarisman	Ed Osmera, Sarimah		Merdeka Film Productions
Satu Penentuan	M. Ahmad	Hussein Abu Hassan, Maznah Ahmad, Sharifah Hanim, Latiff Ibrahim		Merdeka Film Productions
Satu Titek di Garisan	M. Amin	Aziz Jaafar, Dayang Sofia, Kuswadinata, Bat Latiff		Cathay-Keris Film; Entered into the 1973 Asia Pacific Film Festival; Last film produced by Cathay-Keris Film
Semerah Cindai	Omar Rojik	Ed Osmera	Drama / Action	Merdeka Film Productions
Terbabas	S. Kadarisman	Mariati, Hussein Abu Hassan, Tamam Idris, Tony Azman, Normaya, Salmiah Dahlan, S. Kadarisman	Action / Adventure	Merdeka Film Productions
1974
Anak Setan	Omar Rojik	Ed Osmera, Mariati, Dali Seliwangi, Rahim B, Latiff Borgiba		Merdeka Film Productions
Bujang Tua S.S.	S. Kadarisman	Dali Siliwangi, Mariati, Yusuf Botak, S. Kadarisman		Merdeka Film Productions
Jantina	Naz Achnas	Ed Osmera, Noran Nordin, Norizan	Comedy	Merdeka Film Productions
Mastura	Naz Achnas	Hussein Abu Hassan, Norizan, Noran Nordin		Merdeka Film Productions
Pertiwi	M. Amin	Ed Osmera, Sharifah Hanim, Dali Siliwangi, Mariati		Merdeka Film Productions
Puaka	Omar Rojik	Ed Osmera, Mariati, Alias Lantau, Mak Enon, Shariff Baboo, Tony Azman, Samsi Said, Hussein Jantan, Rahim B	Horror	Merdeka Film Productions
Semambu Kuning	S. Kadarisman	Dali Siliwangi, Anita Sarawak, Latiff Borgiba		Merdeka Film Productions
1975
Boneka Permata	Tony Azman	Dali Siliwangi, S. Zamilah		Pura Emas Film
Bunga Padi Berdaun Lalang	Hussein Abu Hassan	Hussein Abu Hassan, Mahyon Ismail		Merdeka Film Productions; The film is now owned by SIAR
Jiwa Remaja	Jamil Sulong	Hail Amir, Uji Rashid, Yusof Haslam	Drama / Tragedy	Merdeka Film Productions; Coloured film Entered into the 1976 Asia Pacific Film Festival The film is now owned by SIAR
Keluarga Comat	Aziz Sattar	Aziz Sattar, Ibrahim Pendek, Junainah M. Amin, S. Shamsuddin, Deddy M. Borhan	Comedy	Sabah Film Production; Coloured film Entered into the 1975 Asia Pacific Film Festival The film is now owned by SIAR
Paper Tiger	Ken Annakin	David Niven, Toshirō Mifune, Hardy Krüger, Kazuhito Ando	Drama / Adventure	The Rank Organisation, Embassy Pictures Colour by Technicolor Copyright holder with ODMedia Network
Permintaan Terakhir	Jamil Sulong	Uji Rashid, Norzie Nani, Sony Abdullah, Ahmad Daud, Saadiah, Yusof Haslam, Fauziah Ahmad Daud, Shigim	Drama / Family / Tragedy	Merdeka Film Productions; Coloured film Entered into the 1975 Asia Pacific Film Festival The film is now owned by SIAR
Pontianak	Roger Sutton	Hamid Bond, Ah Leng, Tan Mei Kwang, Jeniffer Kaur, Herdawati, Piya Johnny, Shariff Medan, Lim Peng Hock, Mahmood Kicap, MacTom, Mak Huri, Leo Fitzpatrick, Francis Xavier, The Family Robinson Band	Horror	Hamid Bond Organization-Kobe Trading Company co-production Coloured film
Semalam di Malaysia	Nico Pelamonia	Norzie Nani, Bimbo, Hassim		Indonesia–Malaysia co-production Coloured film
Si Buta	Omar Rojik	Hussein Abu Hassan, Mariani, Dali Siliwangi, Elisa Agustine	Drama	Merdeka Film Productions
1976
Bukan Salah Asuhan	Ismail Sasakul	Ismail Sasakul, Faezah Abdullah, J.Ibrahim, Marzima		Coloured film Adaptation from the novel Bukan Salah Asuhan
Cinta dan Lagu	Jamil Sulong	Hail Amir, Noor Azizah, Yusof Haslam, Norzie Nani, M. Shahdan, Jamil Sulong, Norizan, Nik Muhammad, Said Manaf	Musical / Romance	Merdeka Film Productions; Coloured film
Dayang Suhana	Aziz Abas	Rahim Razali, Rubiah Suparman, Karim Latiff, Mahmood June, Sarbanun Marican		Filem Negara Malaysia; Coloured film
Hapuslah Air Matamu	M. Amin	Sharifah Aini, Latiff Ibrahim, Broery Marantika, Normadiah, Ahmad Nawab, Christine Hakim, AK Jailani, AR Ayappan, Aziz Jaafar, Deddy M. Borhan	Drama / Musical	Sabah Film Production; Indonesia–Malaysia co-production Coloured film Entered into the 1976 Asia Pacific Film Festival The film is now owned by SIAR
Loceng Maut	Naz Achnas	Hussein Abu Hassan, Teh Faridah, Yusof Haslam		Entered into the 1978 Asia Pacific Film Festival
Malaysia Five	John Aristorenas	Aziz Jaafar, Sarimah		Malaysia–Philippines co-production Sari Artis Film; Coloured film
Raja Laut	Z. Lokman	Mokhtarudin, Ed Osmera, Sharifah Hazariah	Drama / Action	Coloured film
Sayang Anakku Sayang	Jamil Sulong	Noor Azizah, Zulkifli Zain, Aziz Jaafar, Mak Enon, Yusof Haslam, Aziz M. Osman	Drama / Family	Merdeka Film Productions; Coloured film Entered into the 1976 Asia Pacific Film Festival
1977
Menanti Hari Esok (Waiting for Tomorrow)	Jins Shamsuddin	Jins Shamsuddin, Noorkumalasari, Christine Teoh, Sarimah, Umi Kalthum, Zahari Zabidi, Salim Bachik, Dayang Sulu, Sony Abdullah, Hail Amir, Sarena Hashim, Ramlee Abu Bakar, Shukri Hadafi	Heavy drama	Perusahaan Filem Malaysia (PERFIMA); Coloured film The film is now owned by KRU Studios & SIAR via United Studios
Pendekar	M. Amin	Aziz Jaafar, Teh Faridah, Noor Azizah, Deddy M. Borhan, A. Rahim	Action	Sabah Film Production; Coloured film The film is now owned by SIAR
1978
Dendam Perawan	Senir Kerapyrayon	Noor Azizah, S. Roomai Noor, Karim Siraj, Laxmee Pengseangduen, Santi Krapayoon		Coloured film
Gila-Gila	Omar Rojik	Abdullah Chik, Hamidah Wahab, Yahya Sulong, Hamid Gurkha, R. Jaafar, Mahmud June, Normadiah	Comedy Drama Romance|| Sabah Film Production; Coloured film The film is now owned by SIAR	
Panglima Badul	Hussein Abu Hassan	A. R. Badul, Yusni Jaafar, Hussein Abu Hassan, Benjamin S, R. Jaafar, Normadiah, Mahmood June, Ernie Yusnita	Action / Comedy	Solo Film; Coloured film Entered into the 1979 Asia Pacific Film Festival The film is now owned by SIAR
Sumpah Semerah Padi	M. Amin	Deddy M. Borhan, Raja Nor Baizura, Saadiah	Drama / Action	Sabah Film Production; Coloured film
1979
Ceritaku Ceritamu	Saadiah	Fauziah Ahmad Daud, Meor Hashim Manaf, Saadiah, Zainurdin Ismail, Zakaria Yusof, Ali Rahman, Noor Azizah, Buyong, Omar Manan, Mazuin Hamzah, Sharifah Aminah, Umar Shariff, Din Morgan		Anang Enterprise Production; Coloured film Film directed by the first woman film director in Malaysia
Kisah Seorang Biduan	M. Amin	Dhalan Zainuddin, Gaya Zakri, Yusof Latiff, Dian P. Ramlee, Ahmad Mahmud	Musical / Romance	Sabah Film Production; Coloured film
Mat Tenggek	Mat Sentol	Mat Sentol, Sukarni Jaafar, Wahid Satay, Momo Latiff	Comedy	Maju Film; Coloured film
Pasung Puaka	M. Osman	Mokhtarudin, Salina Ismail, Ashari Hamid, Ahmad B, SA Bakar, Rokiah Roslan	Action	Titiwangsa Film; Coloured film
Penagih Dadah	Mat Sentol	Dam Umbara, Mahmud June, Effa Rizan, Karim Latiff	Drama	Maju Film; Coloured film
Prebet Lapok	Aziz Sattar	A. R. Badul, Jastina, Raja Ismail, Tawil, Aziz Sattar, Abu Bakar	Action / Comedy	Indra Film; Coloured film The film is now owned by SIAR
Si Badul	Aziz Sattar	A. R. Badul, Milah Hussein, R. Jaafar, Mahmud June, Normadiah, Raja Ismail, Julie Dahlan	Comedy	Sabah Film Production; Coloured film The film is now owned by SIAR
Si Bogo	Ismail Sasakul	Ismail Sasakul, Rozaini Hashim, Tengku Chik, Daud Selamat, Omar Ragol Ismail		Pantai Timur Film
Surat Dari Desa	Rahman B	Yunus Mansor, Faizah Nor, Rahman B		Filem Negara Malaysia
Tiada Esok Bagimu (You Have No Tomorrow)	Jins Shamsuddin	Jins Shamsuddin, Noorkumalasari, Sarimah, S. Roomai Noor, Umi Kalthum, Mahyon Ismail, A. Rahim, Normala Omar, Salina Ismail, Zulkifli Zain, Yusof Haslam	Heavy drama	Perusahaan Filem Malaysia (PERFIMA); Coloured film Entered into the 1978 Asia Pacific Film Festival The film is now owned by KRU Studios & SIAR via United Studios
Tuan Badul	Jamil Sulong	A. R. Badul, Noorkumalasari, S. Shamsuddin, Ibrahim Pendek, Norlia Ghani	Comedy	Varia Film; Coloured film The film is now owned by SIAR
