= Bujang Lapok Kembali Daa =

1986 film by Aziz Sattar

- Directed by: Aziz Sattar
- Written by: Aziz Sattar
- Screenplay by: Aziz Sattar
- Story by: Aziz Sattar
- Produced by: Aziz Sattar
- Starring: Aziz Sattar; S. Shamsuddin; Nasir P. Ramlee; Mahmud Jun; Norlida Ahmad; M. Rajoli
- Music by: Nasir P. Ramlee
- Production company: A. A. Satta Film Production
- Release date: 1985
- Running time: 90 min
- Country: Malaysia
- Language: Malay

Bujang Lapok Kembali Daa, or The Return of the Three Bachelors is a 1985 Malaysia Malay-language comedy film directed, written and acted in by Aziz Sattar. In this film, P. Ramlee's son, Nasir P. Ramlee (1953–2008) took over his late father's place in the trio. This would be the fifth and last installment of Bujang Lapok film series.

== Cast ==
- Aziz Sattar as Aziz
- S. Shamsuddin as Sudin
- Nasir P. Ramlee as Nasir
- Mahmud Jun as Oto-San
- Norlida Ahmad
- Norakma Yunos
- M. Rajoli as Thief
- M. Fauzi as Thief
- Rose Hazira Hashim
- A. R Ayappan
