= Tiga Abdul =

1964 film by P. Ramlee

- The one-sheet for Tiga Abdul.
- Directed by: P. Ramlee
- Written by: P. Ramlee
- Starring: P. Ramlee; Sarimah; Ahmad Nisfu
- Music by: P. Ramlee
- Production company: Malay Film Productions
- Distributed by: Shaw Brothers Ltd.
- Release date: 22 April 1964
- Country: Malaysia
- Language: Malay (with English subtitles)

Tiga Abdul (English: The Three Abduls; title numerized on screen as 3 Abdul) is a 1964 Singaporean Malay-language black-and-white comedy film directed by and starring Malaysian silver-screen icon P. Ramlee. It tells the story of three brothers who are caught in a web of trickery set by the cunning Sadiq Segaraga, who uses his three daughters to try and fleece the three brothers of all their wealth. The movie is a tribute to traditional folktales with a moral set into the story and is set in a fictional Middle Eastern country named Isketambola, loosely based on Istanbul, Turkey, it also loosely refers to the Ottoman Empire's decline, its final years and its collapse. It was the last film to be directed by P. Ramlee in Singapore before he moved to his new workplace in Merdeka Studios, Kuala Lumpur in 1965.

== Plot ==
Ismet Ulam Raja, a wealthy businessman, has three sons: Abdul Wahab, Abdul Wahib, and Abdul Wahub. While Abdul Wahab and Abdul Wahib are selfish and business-minded, Abdul Wahub leads a modest life, running a small music shop. On Ismet's birthday, he suffers a heart attack. While Abdul Wahab and Abdul Wahib plot to inherit their father's wealth, Abdul Wahub tries to convince his father to go to the hospital, which Ismet refuses. Ismet passes away at home, and his wealth is divided between Abdul Wahab and Abdul Wahib, leaving Abdul Wahub only their father's house. Though upset, Abdul Wahub accepts this outcome and resumes his simple life.

Sadiq Segaraga, a friend of Ismet, schemes to claim the family fortune. He instructs his three daughters—Hamidah, Rafidah, and Ghasidah—to woo the three brothers. Hamidah and Rafidah succeed with Abdul Wahab and Abdul Wahib, but Ghasidah and Abdul Wahub argue whenever they meet.

Abdul Wahab and Abdul Wahib seek Sadiq's permission to marry his daughters. Sadiq agrees, on the condition they sign a contract drafted by his lawyer, Kassim Patalon. The contract states that if they lose their temper during the marriage, all their wealth will go to Sadiq, and they will be sold as slaves. Suspicious but eager, they sign the contract. After the weddings, they face harsh conditions at Sadiq's home, such as being barred from eating the food and sleeping in the stables. Losing their tempers, Sadiq enforces the contract, seizing their wealth and selling them as slaves.

Abdul Wahub witnesses his brothers being sold in the market but cannot intervene. That night, he dreams of his father's spirit, who directs him to Sulaiman Akhlaken, Ismet's overseas lawyer. Sulaiman reveals that Ismet's overseas properties now belong to Abdul Wahub, making him wealthier than his brothers combined.

Armed with his newfound wealth, Abdul Wahub proposes to Ghasidah. Initially skeptical of Abdul Wahub's financial standing, Sadiq agrees after seeing proof of his wealth. Sadiq presents the same contract, but Abdul Wahub counters with a second contract: if Sadiq loses his temper, Abdul Wahub will claim all of Sadiq's wealth and sell him as a slave. Sadiq reluctantly signs.

After marrying Ghasidah, Abdul Wahub encounters the same conditions as his brothers but remains unbothered. Over the next few days, he cleverly outwits Sadiq, avoiding Ghasidah, staging fake dates with another woman, and giving away items from Sadiq's shop to the poor. These antics nearly drive Sadiq to anger, but Kassim reminds him of the contract.

Eventually, Ghasidah confronts Abdul Wahub about his supposed infidelity. Abdul Wahub reveals it was all an act to frustrate Sadiq. He confesses his love for Ghasidah, and she admits she loves him too.

Sadiq finally loses his temper when Abdul Wahub invites the townspeople to take anything they want from Sadiq's house. Abdul Wahub reveals the contract, seizing Sadiq's wealth and selling Sadiq, Kassim, Hamidah, and Rafidah as slaves.

Later, Abdul Wahub buys back his brothers, Sadiq, Hamidah, and Rafidah but leaves Kassim in slavery. Returning to their family home, Abdul Wahub delivers an emotional speech, apologizes for his actions, and releases everyone from the contracts. By the film's end, those who served as slaves learn the value of humility and kindness.

== Cast and characters ==
=== Main ===
- P. Ramlee as Abdul Wahub Ulam Raja, the youngest of three Ismet's sons, owner of a shop selling musical instruments and records.
- Haji Mahadi as Abdul Wahab Ulam Raja, the eldest of three Ismet's sons, owner of a shop selling birds.
- S. Kadarisman as Abdul Wahib Ulam Raja, the second son of Ismet Ulam Raja, owner of a carving workshop.
- Sarimah as Ghasidah Segaraga, the youngest of three Sadiq's daughters.
- Mariani as Hamidah Segaraga, the eldest of three Sadiq's daughters.
- Dayang Sofia as Rafidah Segaraga, the second daughter of Sadiq Segaraga.

=== Supporting casts ===
- Ahmad Nisfu as Sadiq Segaraga, owner of an antique shop, father of Hamidah, Rafidah and Ghasidah.
- Salleh Kamil as Kassim Patalon, Sadiq's accomplice attorney cum adviser. (serve as the main antagonist).
- S. Shamsuddin as S. Shamsuddin Al-Haj (the storyteller).
- H. M. Busra as the slave trader.
- M. Babjan as Ismet Ulam Raja, the richest magnate in Isketambola, owner of various enterprises, father of the three Abduls.
- Nyong Ismail as Hussain Lempoyang, a camel dealer from Cairo.
- Ahmad Sabri as Suleiman Akhlaken, Ismet Ulam Raja's attorney.
- S. Sudarmaji as a person looking for bird's dung to be used as fertiliser.
- Udo Omar as the orphanage's teacher.

=== Cameos ===
- Saloma as herself. She appears at the beginning of the film, singing the title song.
- Murni Sarawak (uncredited) as Fatima Hatem Thai, deceased mother of the three Abduls, wife of Ismet Ulam Raja. Only her portrait appears in the film.
- Kassim Masdor
- Rahayu Sudarmaji
- Vicky Ghazi
- A. R. Badul as Orphans who sing "Tolong Kami Bantu Kami"

== Songs ==
- Bunyi Guitar (The Sound of the Guitar) - Performed by P. Ramlee
- Tolong Kami, Bantu Kami (Oh Please Help Us) - Performed by P. Ramlee
- Sedangkan Lidah Lagi Tergigit (Even the Tongue Gets Bitten) - Performed by P. Ramlee and Saloma
- Allah Selamatkan Kamu (May Allah Save You) - Performed by Ahmad Nisfu

== See also ==
- List of P. Ramlee films
- P. Ramlee
