= Air Mata di Kuala Lumpur =

Song by Saloma
- Language: Bahasa Melayu
- English title: "Tears in Kuala Lumpur"
- Published: 1972
- Songwriter(s): P. Ramlee

"Air Mata di Kuala Lumpur" (English: "Tears in Kuala Lumpur") is a song written by Malaysian P. Ramlee. The song was composed before his death on 29 May 1973, at the age of 44. The song was recorded by his wife, Saloma.

The song was intended to be used in a film of the same title. The film would have been the first colour film Ramlee directed, but Ramlee died before it could be shot. Saloma's recording was released as the title track of an album in 1974.

== Lyrics ==
The lyrics of the song as written by P. Ramlee describe the gloomy days and feeling of unhappiness and despair. In the song he wrote "Hancur musnah impian mulia" ("Noble dreams are shattered"), "Gelaplah pasti masa hadapan" ("The future is certainly dark"), "Zahirku hidup hai batinku mati" (My appearance is alive but my mind is dead"), and "Remuk redam hatiku hancur" (My heart is crushed). The song may be interpreted as his feeling of disappointment and sadness at failing to achieve his dream in Kuala Lumpur after years of success with the Malay Film Productions in Singapore. The line "Istana ku bina menjadi pusara" ("I built a tomb out of the palace ") describes his sense of failure. In the line ''Jiwaku merayau utara dan selatan" ("My soul wanders North and South"), he wondered if he should go back North to his birth place Penang or South to Singapore.

The song, however, was sung by his wife Saloma, and the lyrics could therefore also be interpreted as her feeling of sadness and despair over his unexpected death.

== Covers ==
The song has been covered by many artists, including Liza Hanim in her tribute album to Ramlee Dimana Kan Ku Cari Ganti, Siti Nurhaliza, Aishah, and Hazama.
