= Nasib Si Labu Labi =

1963 film by P. Ramlee

- Directed by: P. Ramlee
- Written by: P. Ramlee
- Starring: P. Ramlee; M.Zain; Udo Omar; Mariani
- Music by: P. Ramlee
- Production company: Malay Film Productions
- Distributed by: Shaw Brothers
- Release date: 26 April 1963
- Countries: Singapore, Malaysia
- Language: Malay

Nasib Si Labu Labi (English: The Fate of Labu and Labi), or known as What Happened to Labu and Labi is a 1963 Singaporean Malay-language black-and-white buddy comedy film directed by and starring P. Ramlee. The film is a sequel to Labu dan Labi and features a number of returning cast members.

== Plot ==
Set sometime after the events of the previous film, Haji Bakhil's wife has died. Haji Bakhil is alone and depressed, but eventually meets a beautiful young woman named Murni or Murniyati Haji Ibrahim(Murni Sarawak), who is a teacher at a school for orphans. Haji Bakhil (Udo Umar) spends some time pursuing her, and his attention is apparently not unwelcome.

In a subplot, Labu and Labi discover that they are both in love with Haji Bakhil's daughter Manisah, and decide to fight for her properly in a boxing match. However, this thread is not resolved by the end credits, and the pair's feud is not addressed after their failed boxing match.

In the main plot, Haji Bakhil eventually sends Labu and Labi on his behalf to Murni's house to ask her father (Ibrahim Pendek), for her hand in marriage, but Murni's father refuses. Labu and Labi come up with a plan to kidnap Murni in the middle of the night for an elopement, but they accidentally kidnap Murni's father, instead and bring him in a blanket to Tok Kadi (Aziz Sattar). Labu, Labi and Haji Bakhil are arrested and tried by the judge(Hakim) (Ahmad Nisfu). Haji Bakhil is able to post his own bail, but he refuses to bail his servants. The film ends with Labu and Labi moaning their fate in prison.

== Cast ==
- P. Ramlee as Labi
- M. Zain as Labu
- Mariani as Manisah
- Udo Omar as Haji Bakhil
- S. Sudarmaji as Teacher Sudar
- Habsah Buang as Headmistress
- Murni Sarawak as Teacher Murni
- S. Shamsuddin as Boxing Club Coach
- Ibrahim Pendek as Murni father's
- Ahmad C as Ahmad
- Aziz Sattar as Matchmaker
- Ahmad Nisfu as the judge
- Ahmad Mahmud as Beauty pageant judge 1
- Omar Rojik as Beauty pageant judge 2
- Rosnani Jamil as Beauty pageant judge 3
- Sarimah Ahmad as Beauty pageant judge 4
- Dayang Sofia as Beauty pageant judge 5
- Saloma as Singer at variety show

== Songs ==
- Barang Yang Lepas Jangan Dikenang (Don't Yearn For That Which is Gone)
- Tarian Silat Orang Melayu (Malay Silat Dance)
- Aci Aci Buka Pintu (Aci, Aci, Open the Door)
