= Bidasari (film) =

- Directed by: Jamil Sulong
- Starring: Jins Shamsuddin; Sarimah Ahmad
- Production company: Malay Film Productions
- Release date: 1965
- Countries: Malaysia; Singapore
- Language: Malay

Bidasari is a 1965 Singaporean Malay-language black-and-white romantic drama film starring Jins Shamsuddin and Sarimah. The film is notable for having dialogue that is written almost completely as rhyming poetry. The story is based on Syair Bidasari, a very popular romantic Malay poem during 18th and 19th century in the Malay world believed to be written as early as 1750. The poem, based on the Kembayat Negara annals and mentioned by Dr. J. Leyden in 1807 as Hikaiat Bida Sari (Bidasari Annals), has some similarities with the western fairy-tale of Snow White published by The Brothers Grimm in their fairy-tale compilation in 1812.

== Plot ==
A merchant and his young son are traveling near by a river when he stumbles upon a drifting boat that contains a baby girl, and a live goldfish in a bowl. The merchant realises the baby is unusual because her life is bonded to the fish: if the fish leaves the water, the baby stops breathing. The merchant adopts the baby and names her Bidasari. Years later Bidasari grows up into a beautiful young woman (Sarimah), while the merchant and his family prosper, believing their good fortune is due to Bidasari's entering their lives.

In this kingdom, the King has remarried a beautiful woman, the Permaisuri (Queen). The Permaisuri secretly practises witchcraft, and has a magic mirror that can reveal to her anything she asks. One day when she asks the mirror who the most beautiful in the land is, the image of Bidasari appears. The Permaisuri has her servants find Bidasari and, under the guise of kindness, asks the merchant to send Bidasari to the palace to be her companion. Once Bidasari arrives at the palace, she is sent to the kitchens as a servant, where she is starved and given the dirtiest tasks.

After the Permaisuri is satisfied that Bidasari's beauty has been ruined, she asks the mirror who the most beautiful in the land is. When the mirror shows Bidasari, the Permaisuri tries to burn Bidasari's face with firewood, but is shocked when the fire magically goes out and Bidasari's face is unharmed. Bidasari begs for mercy and explains that her life is bonded to a fish that is kept in a bowl in her father's garden. That night the Permaisuri has a servant steal the fish, and as soon as it leaves the water, Bidasari stops breathing and collapses. The Permaisuri hangs the fish around her neck as a trophy, and is satisfied when the mirror now reveals her to be the most beautiful in the land. The next day the merchant realises the fish is missing, and is told that Bidasari died mysteriously at the palace. Her body is returned to him and he builds a tomb for her in the woods.

Soon after, the merchant's son travels to another kingdom to expand the family business. He meets their King and Queen, who lost their eldest child, a princess, when their kingdom was attacked. The King and Queen explain their daughter's unusual nature: her life is bonded to a fish. Bidasari's brother tells them that Bidasari must be their daughter, but she has sadly just died. The King and Queen decide to travel to Bidasari's kingdom to see her body for themselves.

Meanwhile, the Permaisuri's stepson the Prince has been having dreams about Bidasari, though he has never met her. The Permaisuri observes his strange behaviour and plants a painting of Bidasari in his room. The Prince uses the painting to find the merchant, who tells him of Bidasari's death and the disappearance of the fish. The Prince decides to visit Bidasari's tomb and is shocked when she spontaneously awakens — the Permaisuri is having a bath at that exact same time and the fish has broken free of the locket to start swimming. Bidasari tells the Prince what happened to her but collapses before she can leave with him; the Permaisuri has finished bathing and caught the fish again. The Prince returns to the palace and demands the Permaisuri give him the fish. The Permaisuri denies everything, and the King declares that his son has gone insane. A fight ensues, during which the Permaisuri is injured and dies.

Before the Prince can be arrested, the merchant, Bidasari's biological parents, and the Prince's manservants arrive with Bidasari on a stretcher. The merchant and other King explain that Bidasari is a princess, and that the story about the fish being bonded to Bidasari's life is true. The Prince revives the fish in the water, which causes Bidasari to awaken. The King apologises to his son, and the Prince and Bidasari are married.

== Cast ==
- Sarimah Ahmad as Bidasari
- Jins Shamsuddin as Putera
- Malek Sutan Muda as Orang Kaya
- S. Kadarisman as the Sultan
- Zahara Ahmad as the Permaisuri
- S. Shamsuddin as Selabah
- H. M. Busra as Mubarak
- Habsah Buang as Bidasari foster mother
- Shariff Dol
- Ed Osmera
