= Ibrahim Din =

Malaysian actor and comedian

- إبراهيم دين
- Born: Ibrahim Faizal bin Din; 1929; Kampung Baru, Kuala Lumpur, Malaysia
- Died: 16 June 1996 (aged 66–67); Kuala Lumpur
- Resting place: Jalan Ampang Muslim Cemetery, Kuala Lumpur
- Occupations: Actor, comedian
- Years active: 1961–1989
- Children: 4
- Relatives: Fazliyaton (sister)

Ibrahim Din (1929 – 16 June 1996) was a Malay film actor, best known for playing the role of Mi in the Do Re Mi film trilogy alongside P. Ramlee and A. R. Tompel.

== Early life ==
Ibrahim Din was born in 1929 at Kampung Baru, Kuala Lumpur.

== Career ==
Starring alongside P. Ramlee in the Do Re Mi series and in Anak Bapak raised Ibrahim's profile in the burgeoning Malay film industry of the time. He starred in films such as Gadis Langkawi and Sabarudin Tukang Kasut, but it was for playing Mi in Do Re Mi that he was best known.

== Death ==
Ibrahim died on 16 June 1996 at Bandar Baru Sentul after suffering from diabetes and hypertension for many years. He was buried at Jalan Ampang Muslim Cemetery, Kuala Lumpur.

== Filmography ==
=== Film ===
Year	Title	Role	Notes
1961	Abu Nawas		First role
1966	Gadis Langkawi		
1966	Do Re Mi	Mi (Minami)	
1966	Sabarudin Tukang Kasut	Ahmad Tipulizam	
1966	Nasib Do Re Mi	Mi	
1968	Anak Bapak	Salleh	
1972	Laksamana Do Re Mi	Mi	
1978	Gila-Gila	Mamak	
1982	Kami	Mamak	
1983	Bertunang	Kassim	
1984	Anak Niat	Orang Kaya Ali	
1984	Pagar-Pagar Cinta	Tuan Hashim	
1985	Bujang Selamat	Tok Guru	
1986	Jejaka Perasan	Mamak	
1986	Si Jantung Hati	Orang Kaya Mi	
1989	Kembar Siam	Film Producer	Last film

=== Television ===
Year	Title	Role	TV channel
1964	Mata Permata	Bomoh	TV1
