= Nujum Pa' Blalang =

Nujum Pak Belalang
- Directed by: P. Ramlee; S. Sudarmaji (assistant director)
- Written by: P. Ramlee; S. Sudarmaji (script)
- Screenplay by: P. Ramlee
- Story by: P. Ramlee
- Starring: P. Ramlee; Bad Latiff; Hashimah Yon
- Cinematography: A. Bakar Ali
- Music by: P. Ramlee
- Production company: Malay Film Productions
- Distributed by: Shaw Brothers
- Release date: 26 December 1959
- Country: Singapore
- Language: Malay

Nujum Pak Belalang (English: The Fortune-telling of Pak Belalang) is a 1959 Singaporean Malay-language black-and-white comedy film directed by and starring P. Ramlee. The film is styled as a fairytale and is loosely based on a Malay folk tale.

== Plot ==
The film follows Pak Belalang, a lazy man who detests hard work, and his intelligent, hardworking son, Belalang. One day, Belalang encounters two thieves, Badan and Nyawa, who have just stolen two cows. Using his wits, he scares them off and takes the cows home. When he tells his father, Pak Belalang panics and insists on returning the cows to their rightful owners. Belalang suggests that they go to the mayor's house to identify the owners, allowing Pak Belalang to pose as a psychic who can locate the cows. The plan succeeds, and they receive a reward.

The thieves strike again, this time stealing valuables from the royal palace. Sultan Shahrul Nizam announces a reward for anyone who can retrieve the stolen items. The mayor, impressed by Pak Belalang’s "psychic" abilities, brings him to the palace. Caught off guard, Pak Belalang fails to bluff his way through, angering the Sultan, who gives him three days to recover the items or face execution. Desperate, Pak Belalang hides in a cave at Bukit Tunggal, as suggested by Belalang. There, he overhears Badan and Nyawa dividing the stolen loot. Disguising himself as a hunched-back elder, he scares them away and retrieves the gold chest.

Meanwhile, Belalang is captured by palace officials and brought to the Sultan. Just as the Sultan threatens Belalang, Pak Belalang appears, claiming to have found the stolen items. He insists the palace officials crawl on all fours to retrieve the chest, which amuses the Sultan when the gold is recovered. Grateful, the Sultan appoints Pak Belalang as the "National Healer." During his appointment ceremony, the princess, Puteri Sri Bujur Sirih, fakes a fainting spell to meet Pak Belalang, and they secretly confess their love.

Soon after, the Kingdom of Masai arrives with a fleet, proposing a war of wits between their National Healer and Pak Belalang. If Pak Belalang wins, Masai forfeits its land; if he loses, the Kingdom of Beringin Rendang will be ceded to Masai. Pak Belalang, unwilling to partake in the challenge, sends Belalang to secure a boat to escape. Belalang overhears the answers to the riddles from Masai’s National Healer while hiding in their boat. The next day, using this knowledge, Pak Belalang answers all questions correctly, securing victory. The Sultan of Masai demands a bonus challenge, but a desperate Pak Belalang who cries out his son name regretfully, inadvertently guesses the answer when an actual locust (belalang) is revealed, saving the kingdom.

Badan and Nyawa, now working with the Sultan of Masai, kidnap the princess after casting a spell over the palace. Pak Belalang is threatened with death if he cannot locate her. Miraculously, his blessed water reveals the princess’s location and implicates the culprits. Pak Belalang rescues the princess and foils the villains' plans. Overjoyed, the Sultan orders Pak Belalang and the princess to marry. The film concludes with a comedic exchange between Pak Belalang and his son Belalang, who laments not having his own room.

== Cast ==
- P. Ramlee as Pak Belalang
- Bad Latiff as Belalang
- Hashimah Yon as Tuan Puteri Si Bujur Sirih
- Ahmad Nisfu as Sultan Shahrul Nizam, of Beringin Rendang
- Aziz Sattar as Badan (literal translation: Body)
- S. Shamsuddin as Nyawa (literal translation: Soul)
- Sa'amah as the Queen
- Shariff Dol as the Sultan of Masai
- Kemat Hassan as the Prime Minister of Beringin Rendang
- Udo Omar as the Fortune Teller of Masai
- M. Babjan as the Prime Minister of Masai
- Malik Sutan Muda as Hujung Jambatan's Chieftain
- Ali Fiji as Jambul
- H. M. Busra as Buntal
- M. Zain as Kachong
- M. Rafee as Cinkadok
- Habsah Buang as Inang, Incidentally she is also the biological mother of Hashimah Yon.
- Rahmah Rahmat as Chief dancer Ketipang Payung
- Mahmud Hitam and A. Galak as Villagers
