= Sarimah Ahmad =

Malaysian actress

Yang Hormat Dato' Hajah Sarimah Ahmad DIMP
- سريمه
- Born: Sarimah binti Ahmad; 28 April 1942 (age 84); Pulau Rusa, Pekan, Pahang, Malaysia
- Occupations: Actress, producer
- Years active: 1961–2010
- Spouses: Datuk Zulkifli Ahmad (divorced); Nordin Selat (divorced); Paduka Pengiran Haji Hidup Hashim (divorced); Yusof Majid (died)
- Children: 4

Yang Hormat Dato' Hajah Sarimah binti Ahmad (Jawi: سريمه أحمد; born on 28 April 1942) is a Malaysian actress most famously known for her work in various black-and-white Malay films of the 1960s and 1970s including Ali Baba Bujang Lapok, Ibu Mertua-ku, Madu Tiga, Tiga Abdul, Kanchan Tirana, Dr. Rushdi and Gelora.

== Filmography ==
=== Film ===
Year	Title	Role	Notes
1961	Ali Baba Bujang Lapok	Marjina	
1961	Si Tanggang	Puteri Indera Kaca	
1961	Indera Bangsawan	Putera Ratna Gemala Sari	
1962	Lubalang Daik	Endah	
1962	Neracha	Minah	
1962	Ibu Mertua-ku	Sabariah	
1962	Batu Durhaka	Seri Mulia	
1962	Norlela	Puteri Faridah	
1962	Labu dan Labi	Peragawati Sarimah (herself)	
1963	Pilih Menantu	Nona	
1963	Darah Muda	Fauziah	
1963	Nasib Si Labu Labi	Pengadil Ratu Kebaya 5	
1964	Madu Tiga	Rohani	
1964	Tiga Abdul	Ghasidah (youngest daughter)	
1965	Sayang Si Buta	Asmah	
1965	Bidasari	Bidasari	
1965	Dayang Senandong	Puteri Dayang Senandong	
1966	Gerak Kilat	Tina	
1966	Sri Andalas	Sri Mayang	
1967	Jebak Maut	Norlida	
1968	Raja Bersiong	Princess	
1968	Miang Miang Keladi	Rosiah	
1968	Kanchan Tirana	Tilani	
1969	Bukan Salah Ibu Mengandung	Ani	
1970	Dr. Rushdi	Muliani	
1970	Tuah Badan	Latifah	
1970	Gelora	Rima Murni	
1972	Angkara		
1972	Dang Lenggang		
1973	Satria	Wati	
1976	Malaysia Five		Malaysian-Philippines film
1977	Menanti Hari Esok	Nuraini	
1979	Tiada Esok Bagimu	Zaimah	
1980	Detik 12 Malam	Erma	Also as producer
1981	Potret Maria	Maria	
1981	Jejak Bertapak	Liza	As producer
1981	Dia Ibuku	Rohani	As producer
1982	Kabus Tengahari	Junaidah	As producer
1983	Ranjau Sepanjang Jalan	Jeha	
1990	Warna-Warni Hati	Rohani	
1991	Sepi Itu Indah	Datin	
1993	Tarik-Tarik	Mah	
2009	Momok The Movie	Mak Ton	

=== Television series ===
Year	Title	Role	TV channel
2004–2005	Masih Ada Cinta	Zakiah	TV3
2005	Cinta Madinah	Safiah	TV1

=== Telemovie ===
Year	Title	Role	TV channel
2004	Pompuan, Pontianak Dot Dot...		VCD
2006	Takbir Suci	Suraya	Astro Ria
2007	Al-Kausar		Astro Ria

== Awards and nominations ==
- 2nd Malaysia Film Festival, 1981: Best Actress for Dia Ibuku (She's My Mother)
