= Anak-ku Sazali =

- Directed by: Phani Majumdar
- Screenplay by: Phani Majumdar
- Produced by: Run Run Shaw
- Starring: P. Ramlee; Zaiton; Rosnani; Nordin Ahmad; Hashimah Yon
- Cinematography: Abu Bakar Ali
- Edited by: H. R. Narayana
- Music by: P. Ramlee
- Production company: Malay Film Productions
- Distributed by: Shaw Brothers
- Release date: 27 October 1956
- Running time: 137 minutes
- Country: Singapore
- Language: Malay

Anak-ku Sazali (English: Sazali My Son) is a 1956 Singaporean Malay-language black-and-white melodrama film directed and written by Phani Majumdar. The movie is about love between a man and a woman, dreams that can come true and a father's extreme love for his son. The talented P. Ramlee plays the adult father character, Hassan as well as the spoilt son, Sazali Hassan.

== Plot ==
Hassan, an orphan, works for a wealthy family with two children: Mansor and Mahani. Passionate about music, Hassan spends his earnings on a violin and begins learning from a teacher. As they grow older, Mansor leaves for Singapore to study, and Mahani is set to marry someone chosen by her father. In love with Mahani, Hassan decides to flee to Singapore, and Mahani follows. They meet Mansor at the train station, who, though surprised, supports their love. With Mansor's blessing, Hassan and Mahani marry, and Mansor later weds a woman named Rubiah.

Hassan pursues music and becomes a renowned musician. During a gathering to celebrate his new single, Mahani collapses from a severe headache. The doctor informs Hassan that Mahani is pregnant. Overjoyed, Hassan composes a song, Anakku Sazali, for his unborn child. However, Mahani fears she will not survive childbirth and makes Hassan promise to care for their child. Tragically, Mahani dies during labor, leaving Hassan devastated but determined to honor her wish.

Hassan adores his son, Sazali, and pampers him excessively. During childhood, Sazali displays spoiled behavior, such as lying about destroying a sandcastle built by Mansor’s daughter, Rokiah, and stealing her music box. Despite these signs, Hassan remains lenient, believing in loving discipline. Mansor warns Hassan about Sazali's behavior, but Hassan dismisses harsher measures.

As Sazali grows older, his misbehavior escalates. He skips school, steals money, and even commits petty thefts, but Hassan remains blind to his faults, trusting Sazali's lies. Empowered by his father’s indulgence, Sazali becomes the leader of a gang in Singapore. On his birthday, Hassan hosts a party where Rokiah sings for Sazali. Later, Rokiah confides in Hassan that Sazali seduced and abandoned her, leaving her pregnant. When confronted, Sazali denies responsibility and refuses to marry her. Enraged, Hassan finally strikes Sazali, but Sazali retorts that his father’s excessive love enabled his downfall.

Sazali continues his criminal activities, including planning a jewellery store robbery. During the heist, the police arrive, sparking a gunfight. Although Sazali escapes, his face makes the front page of the newspaper. Hassan, heartbroken, visits Mansor, only to learn that Rokiah has died in an accident, which Hassan believes to be a suicide caused by Sazali’s betrayal.

One night, Sazali arrives at Hassan’s house, seeking refuge. Though conflicted, Hassan allows him to stay and prepares food for him. As Sazali sleeps, listening to Anakku Sazali, Hassan reflects on his late wife’s wishes and decides to take the hardest step. He calls the police.

The next morning, the police arrest Sazali at the house. Quietly, Sazali complies. Alone, Hassan gazes at his wife’s photograph, asking for her forgiveness and praying for both his and Sazali’s repentance.

== Cast ==
- P. Ramlee as Hassan/Sazali (dual role)
- Zaiton as Mahani
- Rosnani Jamil as Rubiah
- Nordin Ahmad as Mansor
- Hashimah Yon as Rokiah
- Daeng Idris as Mr. Sulong, school principal
- Habsah Buang as Mansur & Mahani's mother
- Malek Sutan Muda as Mansur & Mahani's father
- Ibrahim Pendek as Sazali's accomplice
- S. Kadarisman as a stage actor
- Siti Tanjung Perak as one of the Bangsawan theatre performers
- Udo Omar as a Bangsawan troupe owner
- Mustarjo as Aziz
- Mak Dara as Mak Timah
- Kemat Hassan as Mr. Rahman, a schoolteacher
- Omar Suwita as one of Sazali's gang members
- Shariff Dol as Big Boss, Sazali's rival gangster and archenemy
- Tony Castello as young Sazali
- Habibah Haron as young Rokiah
- Nyong Ismail as Mr. Sulaiman, a violin teacher
- Jins Shamsuddin as man waiting at train station (cameo)
