= Ibu Mertua-ku =

1962 film by P. Ramlee

- The one-sheet for Ibu Mertua-ku
- Directed by: P. Ramlee
- Screenplay by: P. Ramlee
- Story by: Ahmad Nisfu
- Starring: P. Ramlee; Sarimah Ahmad; Ahmad Mahmud; Zaiton; Mak Dara; Ahmad Nisfu
- Music by: P. Ramlee
- Production company: Malay Film Productions
- Distributed by: Shaw Brothers
- Release date: 7 March 1962
- Running time: 120 minutes
- Country: Singapore
- Language: Malay

Ibu Mertuaku (Malay: My Mother In-Law) is a 1962 Singaporean Malay-language black-and-white melodrama film directed by and starring silver-screen legend P. Ramlee. The film's story revolves around the tragic love affair between Kassim Selamat, a poor musician, and Sabariah, the only daughter of a wealthy woman.

The movie is notable in that the opening act starts out as a light-hearted romantic comedy, but at the 30 minute mark turns into a dramatic tragedy. Like a number of P. Ramlee's works, the film criticises the unofficial caste system that separates the wealthy from the poor. This film is considered a Malaysian classic, not only for some of its songs - notably "Di Mana Kan Ku Cari Ganti" - but also for its depiction of a famous tragedy-induced eye-stabbing scene during the film's climax.

== Plot ==
In 1960s Singapore, Sabariah Mansoor is a young woman who is fascinated with the music of Kassim Selamat, a small-time musician with great talent playing the saxophone. After one of his radio performances, Sabariah calls in to the studio to talk to him personally and express her admiration. They arrange to meet, falling in love at first sight.

Sabariah's wealthy widowed mother Nyonya Mansoor wants Sabariah to marry Dr. Ismadi, an eye doctor, and is shocked when Sabariah tells her that she wants to marry Kassim Selamat. Nyonya tells Sabariah that if she chooses Kassim, she will forfeit all her family's wealth and can never set foot in their house again. Sabariah still chooses Kassim, so Nyonya arranges a quick wedding ceremony for the couple, giving them RM5000, before casting them out of her house.

Kassim and Sabariah move to Penang to start a new life. Although they were happy for a while, they soon spend all their money and have to live as paupers. Kassim wants to make money performing music, but Sabariah disagrees thinking that she can make amends with her mother if Kassim renounces music forever. Kassim is forced to work as a labourer.

One day Kassim returns to their lowly home to see Sabariah crying in the arms of her mother. Nyonya says that she would like to take Sabariah back to Singapore and care for her until she has given birth to her child. Kassim lets Sabariah go, believing that she will return to him.

Months later, Sabariah who is under the care of Nyonya and Ismadi, eventually gives birth to a baby boy named Tajudin. At this time, Kassim receives a fake telegram from Nyonya Mansoor saying that Sabariah died during childbirth. Kassim falls into depression, endlessly crying for days refusing to work. Unbeknownst to him, Sabariah is alive and waiting for him in Singapore. Nyonya reveals her plan to separate the pair through the telegram.

Sabariah eventually divorces Kassim, believing that he abandoned her and their child and agrees to marry Ismadi. Sabariah and Ismadi agree to keep the identity of Tajudin's birth father a secret from everyone, including Tajudin himself.

During this time, Kassim's crying has rendered him completely blind. Unable to pay rent, he is evicted into the street to wander aimlessly. Kassim is eventually found by Mami, a kind middle-aged woman and her daughter, Chombi, who recently lost her husband, taking him into their home. The pair find friendship as they mourn their respective loved ones.

Kassim eventually reveals his talent with the saxophone, and after being encouraged by Mami and Chombi, starts a new career in music using the stage name "Osman Jailani". He becomes a hit and starts touring around all over Malaya, performing in Penang, Taiping, Ipoh, Kuala Lumpur, Seremban, Malacca, Muar, Batu Pahat and Johor Bahru before arriving in Singapore, where Sabariah and her new husband Dr. Ismadi attend his performance.

Overcome with sadness seeing her blinded former husband performing on stage, Sabariah asks Ismadi to heal Kassim's eyes without charge. With the operation a success, Kassim, Mami and Chombi are all invited to stay at Ismadi's home with Sabariah and son while Kassim recovers. After Kassim's eye bandages were removed, he panics seeing Sabariah with Ismadi. Ismadi says that she cannot possibly be his dead wife but just a look-alike, which Kassim reluctantly accepts.

Kassim goes to Nyonya's house, asking her for permission to see his son. Nyonya tells him that she gave the boy away, so Kassim begs her to take him to Sabariah's grave. Nyonya takes him to the grave, but when he realises that it's not Sabariah's, he curses Nyonya for her deception.

Kassim returns to Ismadi's house to confront him with the truth just before entering his room and locking the door. Ismadi, Nyonya and Sabariah beg for forgiveness, but Kassim ignores them, and takes a pair of forks which he uses to pierce his eyes. Kassim then finally opens the door, once again blind with his eyes bloodied. Nyonya collapses when she sees him.

Kassim wanders out of the house until he bumps into Chombi, who is shocked to see his condition. He asks her to take him back to Penang with her as they depart, leaving Sabariah crying as she watches Kassim leave while Ismadi gazes pensively.

== Cast ==
- P. Ramlee as Kassim Selamat / Osman Jailani
- Sarimah Ahmad as Sabariah Mansoor / Maimunah Ismadi
- Mak Dara as Nyonya Mansoor (the main antagonist).
- Ahmad Mahmud as Doctor Ismadi
- K. Fatimah as Salbiah
- Ahmad Nisfu as 'Mamak' Mahyudin Jailani
- Zainon Fiji as Mummy, Chombi's mother
- Zaiton as Kalsom Bee also known as Chombi
- Ahmad C as Husin Jalal, double bassist
- Ali Fiji as Bayen, Chombi's neighbour and a saxophone learner.
- Rahimah Alias as Hayati Ismadi
- Shariff Dol as Abidin
- M. Zain as Abang Ali
- Kuswadinata as Bidin
- M. Babjan as Tok Kadi
- A. Rahim as Osman Hashim, drummer
- Hashim Salleh as Hashim Hassan, 2nd saxophonist
- Kassim Masdor as Ramlan Hadi, pianist
- S. Sudarmaji as Salleh Idham, accordionist
- Omar Suwita as En. Murad (Singapore Radio host)
- M. Rafiee as Nyonya Mansoor's relative
- Nisyah Raguan as Aunt onion
- Suraya Harun as Nurse

== Songs ==
- Jangan Tinggal Daku (Don't Leave Me)
- Di Mana Kan Ku Cari Ganti (Where Can I Find a replacement)
- Jeritan Batinku (The Screams of my Soul)

== Awards and nominations ==
10th Asia Pacific Film Festival 1963

- Best Black & White Photography (Abu Bakar Ali)
- Special Award - Most Versatile Talent (P. Ramlee)

== Impact ==
Mak Dara, who played the wicked mother-in-law of the title, has recalled in various Malaysian documentaries that upon the release of the film, response was so good that random people would stop her in the street to scold her or spit on her.

== Censorship ==
In the recent release of the film on VCD, the scene where Kassim Selamat stabs his eyes with forks has been edited. After Kassim turns away from the camera, the scene then cuts straight to where Chombi wakes up from her sleep. The intermediate shot of Kassim turning back to the camera with blood streaming from his eyes has been removed completely. It is currently unknown if the film will be re-released with this scene intact. The scene is uncut in the recent television broadcast on Astro Prima

== Jangan Tinggal Daku ==
The opening song Jangan Tinggal Daku was re-used as the title song in a later P. Ramlee film Jangan Tinggal Daku. The two films are unrelated, but are similar in style and feature a number of the same cast and crew members.

== Pop culture references ==
The film is referred to in another P. Ramlee film Labu dan Labi, where one of the title characters spoofs the eye-stabbing scene and directly refers to "Kassim Selamat".

The film has also more recently been referenced in the KRU song Gerenti Beres with the line, "Katakan kau seorang doktor, majistret atau lawyer, ahli musik tak main" ("Say that you are a doctor, magistrate or lawyer; musicians are useless"). This refers to the Nyonya Mansoor's belief that Kassim Selamat, a musician, is more lowly than doctors (specifically Dr. Ismadi in the film), as well as magistrates and lawyers. Nyonya Mansoor's oft-quoted line in the film goes, "Siapa Kassim Selamat? Lawyer, majistret?" ("Who is Kassim Selamat? A lawyer, a magistrate?")
