= Do Re Mi (1966 film) =

1966 film by P. Ramlee

- Directed by: P. Ramlee
- Written by: P. Ramlee; A. R. Tompel
- Screenplay by: P. Ramlee
- Starring: P. Ramlee; A. R. Tompel; Ibrahim Din; Rohaya Rahman; Noran Nordin; Wan Chik Daud
- Music by: P. Ramlee; Ahmad Nawab
- Production company: Merdeka Film Productions
- Distributed by: Shaw Organisation
- Release date: July 3, 1966 (Malaysia)
- Running time: 106 minutes
- Country: Malaysia
- Language: Malay

Do Re Mi (English: Do Re Mi) is a 1966 Malaysian Malay-language black-and-white satirical comedy film directed by and starring P. Ramlee. The concept was partly based on the idea of The Three Stooges with Ramlee playing the character Do. Its success led to two sequels, Nasib Do Re Mi (also 1966) and Laksamana Do Re Mi (1972), Ramlee's last film before his death.

== Synopsis ==
A musical film that portrays three comical men whose adventures creates satirical laughter.

== Plot ==
Three men (Do, Re, Mi) lived separate lives of joblessness and useless male stereotype before meeting in a fateful encounter. Desperate to get out of heavy debt, Do resorted to lying about bereavement and cheated his father-in-law out of money, losing his reputation and marriage as a result and leaving town for opportunities in the city. While secretly scouting his breadwinning night club hostess wife out of jealousy, househusband Re accidentally let the house burglarised by a Lone Ranger pretender, for which soon thereafter he got expelled by his wife and divorced. After borrowing two Ringgits from his disgusted girlfriend for city fare, vicenarian Mi attempted a job as a housekeeper in a mansion only to get carried away seeing himself as the new owner, thus getting chased out by the mansion owner and eventually riding a bus looking for another job towards a labour office, where all three aforementioned men would meet for the first time.

Tempers flared at the labour office as Re bemoaned aloud about himself getting chased out by his wife and accused of being a liar. Do, overhearing Re and mistaking Re's story as a jab on himself, took offence to it and was about to start a fight with him, but the two quickly quelled their anger in order to work together chasing after a pickpocket that had just robbed a nearby young woman. Joined by Mi who was already in the vicinity but never arrived at the labour office, the then-duo-now-trio successfully apprehended the running snatcher, handed him over to a police officer, and received a money reward from the young woman. Having done an act of heroism, the trio found commonality in each other, introduced themselves to each other, and agreed to become friends.

Staying at Mi's run-down hut, the trio discussed on making a living and, funded with the earlier money reward, settled down with selling toothbrushes, the first sale of which was humorously completed with the aforementioned mansion owner. Dissatisfied with the result and determining that they needed bigger capital, the trio tried to borrow money from Mi's girlfriend who lived right next door with her father as Mi's neighbour. After much hilarity with the father of the house and borrowing a guitar as well, the trio collected enough capital and funded their new venture as street performers selling snake oil that proved profitable, subsequently for the first time having money on hand, even timely repaying Mi's girlfriend, and as a self-reward going clubbing — which ended abruptly as Re walked away in disgust upon encountering his night club hostess ex-wife.

The next day however, as the trio attempted to continue their snake oil venture on the same street, a mob of angry customers from previous sales rushed in and destroyed their goods, exposing the trio as a fraud, driving them away out of town, depriving them of their cash cow, and leaving their fate in a cliffhanger.

== Cast ==
- P. Ramlee as Do
- A. R. Tompel as Re
- Ibrahim Din as Mi
- Rohaya Rahman as Minah
- Noran Nordin as Midah
- Wan Chik Daud as Milah
- Mahmud Jun as Do's father in-law
- Minah Hashim as Do's mother in-law
- Noraini Yusof as Do's stepmother
- Sharif Babu as Cetti
- Usman Eot as Debt Collector
- Bakar M. as Landlord
- Idris Hashim as Rich Man
- A. K. Jailani as Ahli Mesyuarat Tingkap
- Ahmad Dadida as Pak 'Jebon'
- Saloma as Buloh Inn's singer
- Karim Latiff as Buloh Inn's visitor
- Yusof Bujang as Penyamun Long Ranger
- A. Bakar Jaafar as Snatcher
- Minah Mahmud as Ahli Mesyuarat Tingkap wife's
