= Bujang Lapok (film series) =

1957–1985 film series

The Bujang Lapok ("Old Bachelor") film series consists of five comedy films:

1. Bujang Lapok (1957)
2. Pendekar Bujang Lapok (1959)
3. Ali Baba Bujang Lapok (1961)
4. Seniman Bujang Lapok (1961)
5. Bujang Lapok Kembali Daa (1985)

It is not a direct sequel as there are no canonical references to the events in its predecessor. The first Bujang Lapok film released in 1957 was directed by P. Ramlee, who also played one the three bachelors in the film. The other two were played by S. Shamsuddin and Aziz Sattar. Ramlee directed and acted in three more Bujang Lapok films in late 1950s and early 1960s. The films are noted for its comic portrayal of Malay idiosyncrasies by their three principal characters. Aziz Sattar directed a revival in 1985 starring P. Ramlee's son Nasir P. Ramlee.
