= Labu dan Labi =

1962 film by P. Ramlee

- The one-sheet for Labu dan Labi.
- Directed by: P. Ramlee
- Written by: P. Ramlee; S. Kadarisman
- Screenplay by: S. Kadarisman
- Story by: S. Kadarisman
- Starring: P. Ramlee; M. Zain; Mariani Ismail; Saloma; Udo Omar; Shariff Dol; Babjan; Rahimah Alias
- Cinematography: A. Bakar Ali
- Edited by: HR Narayana
- Music by: P. Ramlee
- Production company: Malay Film Productions
- Distributed by: Shaw Organisation
- Release date: 29 August 1962
- Running time: 103 minutes
- Country: Singapore
- Language: Malay

Labu dan Labi (English: Labu And Labi) is a 1962 Singaporean Malay-language black-and-white buddy comedy film directed by and starring P. Ramlee. The movie was filmed in Singapore and it revolves around the antics of Labu and Labi, two servants with wild imaginations who work in the house of a wealthy but miserly man, Haji Bakhil bin Haji Kedekut. The movie is filmed in the style of a stage pantomime, with over-the-top comedy and featuring the characters occasionally breaking the fourth wall. The film's sequel is Nasib Si Labu Labi (The Fate of Labu and Labi or What Happened to Labu and Labi).

== Plot ==
Labu (Mohd. Zain) and Labi (P. Ramlee) are servants in the household of Haji Bakhil, a miserly old man with a loyal wife and a beautiful daughter (Mariani). Both Labu and Labi are constantly scolded, insulted and forced to do the traditional school punishment ketok-ketampi by the grouchy Haji Bakhil. The two bear the ill-treatment and continue working there without complaint because they are both secretly in love with his daughter, Manisah.

One night as the pair are attempting to sleep on the verandah of Haji Bakhil's house, they exchange stories of make-believe to amuse each other.

=== Night club ===
Labu and Labi talk about what they would do if they were as rich as their boss. Labi imagines that he is a magistrate and Labu pretends to be doctor. In an imaginary sequence, the pair visit a night-club, where "Haji Bakhil" appears as a waiter who attempts to get their order. Labu and Labi watch a performance by Saloma who sings the song Bila Larut Malam with her husband P. Ramlee providing back-up vocals. Following this there is a fashion show where Sarimah is one of the models. After the show, Labu goes back-stage to meet Sarimah in her dressing room, but Labi arrives for exactly the same purpose. The film returns to the "real world", where Labu and Labi are loudly fighting over Sarimah, waking up their boss, Haji Bakhil, who shouts at them to go to sleep.

=== The Malay Tarzan ===
After a while, Labu says that he wouldn't want to live in the city, but out in the free wilderness. He imagines that he is a Malay Tarzan, complete with keris. In this sequence, Haji Bakhil is Chita, Labu's primate sidekick. As Labu is preparing his sambal belacan for his meal, Labi arrives in the dream sequence dressed as a tiger, saying that he wants to eat Labu. The pair start to fight, and it wakes up their boss again, who comes out to scold and order them to go to sleep.

=== In the Wild West ===
After having settled down again, Labu asks Labi whether he would like to live in the wilderness like Tarzan. Labi says that he would much prefer to be a cowboy. He imagines that he's a Sheriff (claiming to be the younger brother of Nat King Cole), while Labi imagines that he is Jesse Labu, the youngest brother of Jesse James, not to mention the most feared outlaw and the deadliest gunslinger in the town. Labu and Labi eventually start a gunfight in the imaginary bar, and their gun sound effects wake their boss up for the third time. Haji Bakhil yells at them to go to sleep, and punishes them for their behaviour by giving them chores to do first thing in the morning.

=== Labu and Labi Find Their Fortune ===
The next morning, Labu goes into the forest to collect the firewood as ordered by Haji Bakhil. As he does, he sees a suspicious man exiting a secret passageway on the top of a small hill. After the man is gone Labu enters the passageway and discovers a room filled with money, presumably stolen. Labu grabs some of the money and leaves his job at the Haji Bakhil home without announcement.

Not too long later, Haji Bakhil and family are given a surprise when Labu's new personal assistant (Shariff Dol) arrives at the house, announcing that Labu has recently inherited a fortune and seeks Manisah's hand in marriage. Haji Bakhil refuses, and as retaliation Labu visits a bomoh who casts a spell on Manisah, causing her to fall into a coma. Labu sends a message to Haji Bakhil that he will remove the spell if he allows Labu to wed his daughter.

Witnessing this turn of events, Labi visits a bomoh of his own, who gives him a magical stone that, when dropped into any water, causes the liquid to have healing properties. Labi uses the stone to cure Manisah. Haji Bakhil is overjoyed and Manisah is touched by Labi's kindness, so Labi is allowed to marry Manisah.

On the day of the wedding, Labu arrives at the house and casts a spell that causes everyone to fall asleep except for Labi, who uses his magic stone to wake up Manisah. Labu enters the house and tries to convince Manisah to marry him instead, but Labi stops him and a fight ensues. During the struggle, Labu grabs an axe and brings it down on Labi's head.

Then it is revealed that the entire sequence was also a dream, and Labu is actually pounding Labi on the head with a pillow. Labu, however, is so caught up in his dream that he doesn't realise that he's woken up, and continues to fight with a confused Labi. Haji Bakhil wakes up yet again and is doubly enraged when Labu continues to boast and act as though he's wealthy and powerful. When Manisah appears at a window to see what the commotion is about, Labu begs her to leave Labi and marry him instead. Manisah is confused and tells Labu he must have been dreaming. This finally makes Labu realise his error.

Haji Bakhil, who is still very angry at having his sleep continually disrupted, punishes both Labu and Labi by making them do squats while holding their ears (ketok-ketampi).

== Cast ==
- M. Zain as Labu, Doktor, Tarzan & Jesse Labu (Jesse James's brother)
- P. Ramlee as Labi, Majistret, P. Ramlee, Harimau & Sheriff
- Mariani as Manisah
- Udo Omar as Haji Bakhil bin Lebai Kedukut, Pelayan Kelab, Monkey (Chita), Pelayan Bar
- Rahimah Alias as Isteri Haji Bakhil
- Shariff Dol as Pengurus Haji Labu
- Saloma as Biduanita Saloma (herself)
- Sarimah as Peragawati Sarimah (herself)
- Aziz Sattar as Aziz Sattar (himself)
- Orkest Pancha Sitara as Penyanyi Kelab
- Orkest Puspa Raya as Pemuzik Kelab
- Nyong Ismail as Bomoh for Labu
- M. Babjan as Penunggu gua for Labi
- Supa'at
- Kassim Masdor
- HM Busra as Pembuat Roti

== Songs ==
- Yang Mana Satu Idaman Kalbu
- Bila Larut Malam
- Singapura Waktu Malam

== Trivia ==
- During the dinner scene, Labu pretends that his eyes had been poked with the forks and he'd been blinded. During his over-the-top moaning, he says "Sampai hati tuan cucuk mata saya, macam Kassim Selamat." ("How cruel of you(so mean of you), sir, to poke in me in the eyes, just like Kassim Selamat.") This is a reference to the character of Kassim Selamat in Ibu Mertua-ku who poked his own eyes with forks to blind himself. Incidentally, Kassim Selamat was played by P. Ramlee.
- P. Ramlee also plays himself in the daydream night-club sequence.
- The character name Haji Bakhil bin Lebai Kedekut is a pun (play on words), as "bakhil" and "kedekut" both mean stingy/miserly in Melayu. Some people use 'haji bakhil' to refer to miserly person.
- It was hinted that the movie was released after 1962 Merger Referendum.
