= Raja Bersiong =

- Directed by: Jamil Sulong
- Written by: Tunku Abdul Rahman (story)
- Based on: Hikayat Merong Mahawangsa (historical myth)
- Production company: Malay Film Productions
- Release date: 1968
- Country: Malaysia
- Language: Malay
- Budget: RM 750,000

Raja Bersiong (King of the Fanged Wings) is a 1968 Malaysian Malay-language historical epic film Malay film directed by Jamil Sulong and based on a story by former Malaysian Prime Minister Tunku Abdul Rahman. Despite costing RM 750,000 to produce, ten times the cost of the average Malaysian film, it was a flop at the box-office.

The story is loosely based on historical myth Hikayat Merong Mahawangsa, first told about Hindu-Malayan empires pre-Islamic Kedah that was once ruled by Raja Ong Maha Perita Deria The story is very popular and has been filmed twice, in 1963 and 1968. It has also been staged as a theatrical production by the Petronas Performing Arts Group.

== Synopsis (Raja Bersiong 1963) ==
A King and his troops came across a town called Kampung Gading. There, they meet a strong but mute and deaf man named Badang, who is the personal servant of a young woman named Chomel. The King pretended to be a normal guard as part of a plan to lure Badang to become his personal protector and Chomel to become his wife. His plan worked and he married Chomel and Badang left to work for him.

Some time later, the king's appetite changed. At dinner one night, he commends the cook for the delicious dish and asked what the main ingredient was. The cook was forced to reveal that the unusual taste was due to his (the cook's) own blood, which had dropped into the dish when his hand was bleeding. The king deduced that the blood was the ingredient to make all his food delicious and commanded that all his food be cooked in human blood from then on. His taste for blood grew so intense that over time he grew fangs and began attacking his own people to feast on them. When people began dying to satisfy the King's thirst for blood, his subjects revolted and the King was killed by them.

== Production ==
The 1968 production of Raja Bersiong was filmed at the Malay Film Productions studio in Singapore and on location in Alor Setar, Malaysia. It was filmed in colour wide-screen CinemaScope, the first for a Malay film. In order to handle the technical aspects of the filming, a Japanese crew was hired. The Japanese crew took over the production, but it caused problem in communication due to the language barrier. Thai dancers from Bangkok were brought in, government workers were used for minor roles, and Malaysian army was used as extras in battle scenes.

The film had a production cost of RM 750,000, ten times the cost of an average Malaysian film at that time. The film was completed in 1967, but released in 1968.
