= Madu Tiga =

- The one-sheet
- Directed by: P. Ramlee
- Written by: S. Kadarisman; P. Ramlee
- Screenplay by: S. Kadarisman
- Produced by: Vee Meng Shaw
- Starring: P. Ramlee; Sarimah; Ahmad Nisfu; M. Rafiee
- Cinematography: Abu Bakar Ali; Mustafa Yassin
- Edited by: Wong Hong Peng; H.R. Raman
- Music by: P. Ramlee
- Production company: Malay Film Productions
- Release date: 12 February 1964
- Country: Singapore[[#ref_At the time of airing, Singapore was then a part of Malaysia until 1965.|^]]
- Language: Malay

Madu Tiga (English: Three Wives) is a 1964 Singaporean black-and-white Malay-language romantic comedy film directed by and starring P. Ramlee, Sarimah, Ahmad Nisfu and M. Rafiee.

In October 2014, The Straits Times ranked Madu Tiga as one of the top five Malay films made in Singapore, calling it a "classic".

== Plot ==
Jamil (P. Ramlee) has been married for twelve years with Latifah (Zaharah Agus). They have no children because Latifah is infertile, and Jamil feels that she is neglecting him. He decides to marry another woman, Hasnah (Jah Hj. Mahadi), without Latifah's knowledge. Latifah's father, Haji Latiff (Ahmad Nisfu), secretly blesses the second marriage.

Latifah learns about the marriage through a friend, and confronts Jamil at the third night of the wedding celebrations. Hasnah and Latifah get into a fight, and Jamil flees in fear, not returning to either of his wives for three days and nights.

Jamil and his father-in-law come up with a plan to make amends with the two wives. For Latifah, Jamil fakes having a broken leg from an accident, and lies to her that he has divorced Hasnah. For Hasnah, Jamil fakes have injuries from getting into a fight with Latifah, and lies to her that he has divorced Latifah. Jamil is reconciled with both, though neither wife knows about the other.

Jamil returns to work. When collecting a debts owed by an old man Pak Ali, he meets Ali's daughter, Rohani (Sarimah), and is enchanted. Jamil decides to pursue Rohani romantically, and asks her to marry him. The pair wed, and Jamil moves Rohani and her father into a luxurious house on the beach.

One day, Latifah and Hasnah meet by chance at a gold shop and get into an argument, during which it is revealed that both of them are still married to Jamil. Before the fight can escalate, Rohani stumbles by and stops them, advising them to find a way to settle their differences peacefully. Rohani volunteers to act as mediator, and asks them to come to her house for a discussion.

The day that Hasnah and Latifah visit Rohani's house, Jamil is also there and hides when he sees his first and second wife. Rohani calls Jamil out to join them, but he refuses to answer. It is then that Hasnah and Latifah notice a photograph of Jamil and Rohani, and the three wives realise that they share the husband. The three women agree not to turn on each other, but to target Jamil for fooling all of them. They chase Jamil frantically, and in the end he surrenders, admitting his mistakes and agreeing to divorce whoever wants to be divorced.

However the three women still love Jamil, and Rohani's thoughtfulness has made Latifah and Hasnah realise that peace is possible between them. All three women will remain married to Jamil, but he must be fair and loving to all three of them equally.

== Cast ==
- P. Ramlee as Jamil
- Sarimah as Rohani, Jamil's third wife
- Jah Hj. Mahadi as Hasnah, Jamil's second wife
- Zara Agus as Latifah, Jamil's first wife
- Ahmad Nisfu as Haji Latiff, Latifah's father
- M. Rafiee as Rafee
- M. Babjan as Pak Ali, Rohani's father
- Zainon Fiji as Mak Hasnah
- Ahmad Sabree as Encik Rashid
- Doris Han as Doris
- Mislia as Rashida
- Sarban Singh
- Musalmah
- Kassim Masdor
- Alias Congo as Apek, an old chinaman who tried to commit suicide by jumping down from a tree.

== Award ==
Eleventh Asian Film Festival (1964) in Taipei

- Best Comedy Film - WON
