= Jamil Sulong =

Malaysian film director (1926–2014)

Dato' Jamil Sulong
- جميل سولونج
- Born: Jamil bin Sulong; August 6, 1926; Parit Sulong, Johor, Malaya British (now part of Malaysia)
- Died: September 25, 2014 (aged 88); Bukit Utama, Damansara
- Occupations: Actor, film director
- Years active: 1951–2008 (Note: His popular book is "Jamil Sulong: Warisan dan Wawasan" and "Kaca Permata : Memoir Seorang Pengarang" published by DBP on 2008.)
- Organizations: ASAS '50; Ikatan Persuratan Melayu (IPM); PERSAMA
- Spouse: Dato’ Hjh Rosnani Jamil (m. 1953)
- Children: 4

Jamil Sulong (6 August 1926 – 25 September 2014) was a Malaysian actor, film director and scriptwriter. Known as a native from Parit Sulong, Johor. He wrote and directed many films under Malay Film Productions (MFP) during his long career until his retirement in 2008. He is noted in Malay cinema for his longevity and passion.

He died due to a common cold at the age of 88 on 25 September 2014 after visiting his grandchildren in Damansara.

== Early life ==
He was the son of Sulong Mansor and Timun Manang. Sulong only attended Elementary School while living in the village. Later he showed interest in drawing comic books and writing musical lyrics in his youth days. In the late 1940s, he organized penulis ASAS '50 in Singapura and Melaka together with his longtime friend: Usman Awang, Yusof Harun, and Mokhtar Yasin.

== Filmmaking career ==
At first, Sulong worked in Malay Film Productions as an English and other language translator around 1948. He later became assistant director in 1951. In his early days of filmmaking, he was outshined by other Malaysian newcomer filmmakers at time, such as A.R. Tompel and P. Ramlee. His first directed film was Batu Belah Batu Bertangkup in 1959. Sulong is widely known for his role as the first Malaccan Sultan, Parameswara/Iskandar Syah in many Malaysian series during the 1960s and 70s.

His first colore TV film was Permintaan Terakhir in 1975, starring famous actress of the time- Uji Rashid.

== Filmography ==
=== Film ===
Year	Role	Credit					Character	Note
Year	Role	Director	Assistant director	Scriptwriter	Audio editor	Actor	Character	Note
1952	Lupa Daratan	No	No	No	No	Yes		Debut
1952	Miskin	No	No	No	No	Yes		
1953	Hati Iblis	No	No	No	No	Yes		
1954	Pawang	No	No	No	No	Yes		
1956	Penarek Becha	No	No	Yes	Yes	No	—N/a	
1956	Hang Tuah	No	Yes	Dialogue	Yes	No	—N/a	
1957	Kaseh Sayang	No	Yes	No	Yes	No	—N/a	
1957	Mogok	No	No	Yes	No	No	—N/a	
1958	Kaki Kuda	No	No	No	Yes	No	—N/a	
1959	Batu Belah Batu Bertangkup	Yes	No	No	No	No	—N/a	
1959	Raja Laksamana Bentan	Yes	No	No	No	No	—N/a	
1960	Isi Neraka	Yes	No	Story	No	Yes	Malaccan Sultan	Peak career
1960	Lela Manja	Yes	No	Story	No	No	—N/a	
1961	Si Tanggang	Yes	No	Story	No	No	—N/a	
1961	Sri Tanjung	Yes	No	Story	No	No	—N/a	
1962	Gerhana	Yes	No	Story	No	No	—N/a	
1962	Lubalang Daik	Yes	No	Story	No	No	—N/a	
1963	Darah Muda	Yes	No	Story	No	No	—N/a	
1963	Budi dan Dosa	Yes	No	Story	No	No	—N/a	
1964	Mambang Moden	Yes	No	Story	No	No	—N/a	
1965	Bidasari	Yes	No	Story	No	No	—N/a	
1965	Dayang Senandong	Yes	No	Yes	No	No	—N/a	
1966	Kacha Permata	Yes	No	Yes	No	No	—N/a	
1966	Gerak Kilat	Yes	No	Yes	No	No	—N/a	
1967	Jebak Maut	Yes	No	Story	No	No	—N/a	
1968	Raja Bersiong	Yes	No	No	No	No	—N/a	
1968	Lain Jalan Ka-Shorga	Yes	No	No	No	No	—N/a	
1969	Sopan Santun Makan Bersuap	Yes	No	No	No	No	—N/a	
1970	Dr. Rushdi	No	No	Dialogue	No	No	—N/a	
1975	Permintaan Terakhir	Yes	No	Yes	No	No	—N/a	
1975	Jiwa Remaja	Yes	No	Yes	Senikata	Yes	Father of Anita and Yusof	
1976	Sayang Anakku Sayang	Yes	No	Yes	No	Yes	Rahman adoptive father	
1976	Cinta dan Lagu	Yes	No	Yes	No	Yes	Marriage officiant	Last act
1979	Dendang Perantau	Yes	No	Yes	No	No	—N/a	
1979	Tuan Badul	Yes	No	Story	No	No	—N/a	
1981	Jejak Bertapak	Yes	No	Yes	No	No	—N/a	
1983	Ranjau Sepanjang Jalan	Yes	No	No	No	No	—N/a	
1984	Jasmin	Yes	No	Story	No	No	—N/a	
1985	Sepi Itu Indah	Yes	No	Yes	No	No	—N/a	
1989	Sumpahan Mahsuri	Yes	No	Story	No	No	—N/a	
1995	Kecil-Kecil Cili Api	Yes	No	Yes	No	No	—N/a	
1998	Raja Melewar	Yes	No	No	No	No	—N/a	Last direct film
2004	Bicara Hati	No	No	Yes	No	No	—N/a	
2022	Showtime 1958	No	No	Yes	No	No	—N/a	Posthumous (some of written script)

== Personal life ==
Aside from filmmaking, Sulong was also an active poet and comic book artist. In 2008, his wife Rosnani Jamil died. Sulong also announced his retirement from all work in the same year. Together they had three children. Arjunaidi Sulong, Anwardi Sulong and Asnadi Sulong, who lives in Dallas, Texas, United States. Sulong also have one adopted daughter, Puan Murniati Jamil.

== Death ==
After visiting his grandchildren, Sulong suddenly collapsed due to a common cold. He died on 25 September 2014. His funeral was attended by several of his junior actors: Erma Fatima, Aziz M. Osman, Bade Hj. Azmi, and Harun Salim Bachik.
