= Nasir P. Ramlee =

Malaysian actor , singer, musician and composer (1953–2008)

- Born: Teuku Mohamad Nasir bin Teuku Zakaria; 23 November 1953; Colony of Singapore
- Died: 17 December 2008 (aged 55); Kuala Lumpur, Malaysia
- Resting place: Jalan Ampang Muslim Cemetery
- Occupations: Actor, singer, musician, composer
- Years active: 1968–2008
- Spouse(s): Mariati Abd Rahman (divorced); Rashidah Jaafar (divorced); Suria (Surjangsih Abu Bakar) (until his death)
- Parent(s): P. Ramlee (father); Junaidah Daeng Harris (mother)

Nasir P. Ramlee (23 November 1953 – 17 December 2008) was a Malaysian actor, composer, musician and singer.

== Early life ==
Nasir was born in Singapore, the son of Malaysian actor P. Ramlee and Junaidah Daeng Harris, whom P. Ramlee married in 1951 and divorced in 1954.

== Career ==
Nasir started his career as a musician in a nightclub before he joined EMI as a music composer. After that, he served as coordinator of combo music at the Istana Budaya (IB) from April 2002.

He later teamed up with the late Datuk Ahmad Daud, Normadiah, Aziz Jaafar and Datuk Aziz Sattar to form the Panca Sitara band.

He had produced songs for Herman Tino, Rosemarie Abdul Hamid and Aman Shah. Among the songs is the popular Rindu Bayangan performed by Carefree.

During his tenure at the IB, Nasir was much involved with shows that were organized by the government as well as those at an international level, such as events like Suzana 60 and Boney M Live In Kuala Lumpur in 2006.

== Personal life ==
Nasir was married three times. His first wife was Mariati Abdul Rahman and his second wife was Rashidah Jaafar. Both marriages ended in divorce. His third marriage was to Surjangsih Abu Bakar until his demise. He had seven children from his three marriages. His first marriage saw three children, Gunina, Gunawan and Gunarisasca. His second marriage had two daughters, Natasya and Najua, and his third two sons, Zaidi and Zakaria.

== Death ==
He died on 17 December 2008 at the age of 55 due to heart complications and diabetes. He was buried at Jalan Ampang Muslim Cemetery, Kuala Lumpur next to the graves of his late father, P. Ramlee and his two step-mothers, Norizan and Saloma.

== Filmography ==
=== Film ===
Year	Title	Role	Notes
1968	Anak Bapak	Jalil	
1969	Kalau Berpaut Di Dahan Rapuh		
1985	Bujang Lapok Kembali Daa	Nasir	
1993	Fantasi	Mr. Rahman	
2007	Budak Lapok	Zakaria (voice)	

=== Television ===
- Selamat Tinggal Mawarku (1969)

=== Other roles ===
- Manis-Manis Sayang (1983) - music
- Bujang Lapok Kembali Daa (1985) - music
- Pagar-Pagar Cinta (1986) - music

=== Other songs ===
- "Pi Mai Pi Mai Tang Tu"
- "Melanchong Ke Tanjung"

== See also ==
- P. Ramlee
