= Laksamana Do Re Mi =

1972 film by P. Ramlee

- Directed by: P. Ramlee
- Written by: P. Ramlee
- Screenplay by: P. Ramlee
- Starring: P. Ramlee; A. R. Tompel; Ibrahim Din; Dayang Sulu
- Edited by: Johari Ibrahim
- Production company: Merdeka Film Productions
- Distributed by: Shaw Organisation
- Release date: 12 May 1973 (Malaysia)
- Running time: 112 minutes
- Countries: Malaysia; Singapore
- Language: Malay

Laksamana Do Re Mi (English: The Admirals Do, Re, and Mi) is a 1972 Malay-language black-and-white adventure fantasy comedy film directed by P. Ramlee. Shot in black and white, it is the third and final installment in the Do Re Mi series of comedy films, and features the trio of actors P. Ramlee, A. R. Tompel and Ibrahim Din reprising their roles as Do, Re and Mi respectively. The story is loosely based on one of stories in One Thousand and One Nights, "The Three Princes and the Princess Nouronnihar", and features the trio becoming admirals and using magic to save a faraway kingdom from ruin. This film is notable as being the last film P. Ramlee and A.R. Tompel before their death in 1973.

== Plot ==
The poor trio of best friends Do, Re and Mi live in a simple treehouse in the forest, where they work together collecting, cutting and selling firewood at the local marketplace. After they were driven out from their treehouse by the land owner they walked in the forest then in the night they hear a voice calling for help in the forest. Although they are scared that it is a spirit trying to trick them, they follow the voice and discover that it is coming from a bamboo tree. The bamboo tree is wounded, and asks them to pull out the spear that is stuck in it. They comply, and the bamboo transforms into a fairy princess, who explains that she is the Tuan Puteri Buluh Betong (Giant Bamboo Princess). When Do asks her whether she is related to Anak Buloh Betong (a character of S. Kadarisman film Anak Buloh Betong), she explains that he is her father. She thanks them and gives them each a magical item. Do receives a magic carpet that can fly, Re receives a telescope that can see anything the viewer asks of it, and Mi receives a harmonica that can give them any wishes they want.

The trio decide to use their items to find their fortune. Re uses the telescope to find that the Sultan of their kingdom is looking for brave men to become his Admirals. The trio attend the competition that is being held to find the bravest and strongest men. Mi uses his harmonica to give the trio superhuman strength, and they win the competition easily. The Sultan, impressed by their feats, makes them his Admirals.

As part of an assignment, the Admirals are sent to an ally neighbouring kingdom, Pasir Dua Butir (lit. 2 Grains of Sand) that is under attack by Fasola, a former Minister of Defense turned traitor after his proposal to the sultan's princess, Princess Puncak Mahligai was rejected. In an act of retaliation, he and his army sack the entire kingdom, rape young girls, butcher loyal civilians and going as far as raze the palace to ground, an act that is considered brainless. He also hold the princess captive in his hiding place. After seeing his princess' distress through Re's telescope, the sultan then promises to marry his princess to anyone who slays Fasola. The excited Do, Re and Mi then sets out on their rescue missions.

Do, Re and Mi defeat whole of Fasola's army, some of it by using Mi's wish-granting harmonica with comical result (make them dancing, for instance). They then confront Fasola. After being insulted by Do, in a fit of rage he defeats them single-handedly with little effort. He and Do then have a sword fight. When it seems that Do gets the upper hand by stabbing Fasola, it is revealed that Fasola is magically impervious to any attack. By using Re's telescope to seek Fasola's weakness, it is revealed that Fasola can only be killed by stabbing a sharp bamboo to his sole. Mi then uses his harmonica to provide them with a sharp bamboo. Seeing the sharp bamboo in Do's hand, Fasola is frightened and he even begs Do to spare his life but Do nonetheless kill him and thus ends the traitor's life.

They free the Princess, whom all three fall in love with. When Do, Re and Mi fight over her, the Princess declares that she will marry all three of them, which three of them agreed, although stunned at first. (The princess reason that if men are able to practice polygamy, why don't women as well?) Do, Re and Mi return to their sultan in triumph. The sultan, like the trio, also falls in love with the princess. When the sultan finds out their odd situations, he then remind them the tale of the legendary Malay Admiral, Hang Tuah who presents Tun Teja, the princess of Pahang to his sultan as sign of his undivided loyalty, despite Hang Tuah and Tun Teja deeply love each other. Then, why don't the Admirals Do, Re and Mi emulate him? The princess, impressed by the sultan's wisdom, agreed. The sultan then announce his wedding to the princess and the entire court give their full approval. Of course, the three Admirals disappointed but the sultan offers to reward them with three palace handmaidens as their wives, whom the sultan claimed are very beautiful. However, it turns out the handmaidens are ugly, old hags. The sultan jokingly tells them the three Admirals are their future husbands! The handmaidens are thrilled and start chasing the Admirals, while the entire court laugh. The Admirals, don't wish to end up marrying old hags, flee with their magic carpets and sending them itchy all over their bodies with Mi's harmonica. Do, Re and Mi laugh at the helpless hags and then flies to an unknown destination.

== Tuan Puteri Buloh Betong ==
According to the princess, Anak Buloh Betong, a demon child that is sired by an evil spirit and was conceived in a Dendrocalamus asper is her father. Anak Buloh Betong was found by the royal family when he is still an infant and is later adopted by them. The child grows up into an evil and unruly prince. When he realizes his true parentage after his outraged foster father, the sultan strikes him and then calls him a child of the forest demon due to his behaviour. He then departs to the bamboo clumps where he was born and met his demonic biological father, and gains his supernatural powers, making him invincible. However he can only be defeated and slain by Panglima Lintah, his sworn enemy. The prince then usurps his foster father's throne and rules with iron fists. At the end of the film, Panglima Lintah burns his bamboo clumps, the source of his powers and his only mean to heal himself, and later kills him.

At some point, it is possible that he sires the princess with an unknown partner, since Princess Buloh Betong confirms that the prince is her father when Do asks her whether she is somehow related to the Anak Buloh Betong, a character in S Kadarisman's movie, in which he is portrayed. The princess doesn't seem to be offended with Do's question, since Anak Buloh Betong is evil. It is unknown whether Anak Buloh Betong is aware that he has a daughter.

The princess then tell Do that she will return to the heavenly realm to heal her injury, meaning that at one point she moves there. It is unknown who imprisons her, and the reasons for it. A likely suspect is her grandfather, the evil spirit who fathers Anak Buloh Betong. In the film, the evil spirit is able to turn his own son into a bamboo stalk, so it must be him that does the same to the princess and then imprisons her.

== Cast ==
=== Main ===
- P. Ramlee as Do
- A. R. Tompel as Re
- Ibrahim Din as Mi
- Dayang Sulu as Puteri Puncak Mahligai

=== Supporting Casts ===
- SH Zamilah as Tuan Puteri Buloh Betong
- Idris Hashim as Royal Advisor Pasir Dua Butir
- Noorizan Mohd. Noor as Queen of Pasir Dua Butir
- C. M. Bakar as The King of Pasir Dua Butir
- Osman Hj Ismail as Sultan Damsyik Jani
- Ramli Ismail (Ramli Kechik) as The Prime Minister of Pasir Berdengung
- Osman Botak as Chief adminal in the ring
- Bakar Kerinting as Adminal in the ring
- Bakar M. as Tuan Tanah Kebun/Tanah Tanah Kedaun
- A. K. Jailani as The Policeman
- Mak Enon as Dayang Istana
- Minah Yem as Dayang Istana

=== Special appearances ===
- Hussein Abu Hassan as Fasola

=== Cameo ===
- Said Daud as Principal Wage Earner
- Yusof Haslam as Match Spectors (uncredited extra)

== Soundtrack ==
One of the songs used in Laksamana Do Re Mi, in the scene where Do, Re, and Mi are riding on a flying carpet, was based on the Japanese wartime song Aikoku Kōshinkyoku. The first four lines are the original Japanese lyrics, repeated as Verses 1 and 2 respectively, while the remaining are sung in Malay and has no correlation with the former; they are simply stating the characters' ambitions.
