= P. Ramlee =

Malaysian singer, actor, and film director (1929–1973)

Yang Berbahagia Seniman Agung Tan Sri Datuk Amar P. Ramlee PSM DA AMN
- ڤي رملي
- P. Ramlee at the 19th Asia-Pacific Film Festival in Singapore, year 1973
- Born: Teuku Zakaria bin Teuku Nyak Puteh; 22 March 1929; Sungai Pinang, George Town, Penang, Straits Settlements, British Malaya (now Malaysia)
- Died: 29 May 1973 (aged 44); Setapak, Kuala Lumpur, Malaysia
- Resting place: Jalan Ampang Muslim Cemetery, Kuala Lumpur
- Monuments: P. Ramlee Memorial
- Other name: Ramlee Puteh
- Education: Sekolah Melayu Kampung Jawa; Francis Light English School (1939–1941); Japanese Navy School (Kaigun Gakko); Penang Free School (1945–1947)
- Occupations: Actor; singer; musician; filmmaker; composer
- Years active: 1945–1973
- Known for: Bujang Lapok film series; Antara Dua Darjat; Sergeant Hassan; Do Re Mi film series; Labu dan Labi film series; Tiga Abdul; Hang Tuah; Ibu Mertua-ku
- Works: Filmography
- Spouses: Junaidah Daeng Harris (m. 1950; div. 1953) Noorizan Mohd. Noor (m. 1955; div. 1961) Saloma (m. 1961–1973)
- Children: 7 (including Nasir)
- Musical career
- Genre: Pop
- Instruments: singer; actor; percussion; saxophone; accordion; trumpet; piano; guitar; viola; ukulele
- Label: EMI

Teuku Zakaria bin Teuku Nyak Puteh (22 March 1929 – 29 May 1973), better known by his stage name P. Ramlee (Puteh Ramlee), was a Malaysian actor, filmmaker, musician, and composer. Born in Penang, Malaya, he was one of the leading figures of the Malay film industry during its golden age. Throughout a career spanning more than two decades, he starred in 62 films, directed 33, and composed more than 500 songs.

P. Ramlee rose to prominence during the golden age of the Malay film industry at Malay Film Productions in Singapore, where he established himself as one of its leading actors, directors and songwriters. In 1964, he moved to Kuala Lumpur to continue his career at Merdeka Studio. His films, which often blended comedy, romance, music and social commentary, have become enduring classics of Malay cinema.

Among his best-known films are Bujang Lapok (1957), Pendekar Bujang Lapok (1959), Nujum Pak Belalang (1959), Tiga Abdul (1964) and Do Re Mi (1966). He received international recognition at the Asian Film Festival, winning Best Male Actor for Anak-ku Sazali (1957) and Best Comedy for Madu Tiga (1964).

Following his death in 1973, P. Ramlee has remained a major cultural figure in Malaysia. His films and songs continue to be widely broadcast and studied, and institutions, awards and cultural venues have been named in his honour. In 2010, CNN included him among Asia's 25 Greatest Actors of All Time, and in 2017 Google honoured him with a Google Doodle to mark what would have been his 88th birthday.

== Name ==
He abbreviated his name to P. Ramlee (Puteh Ramlee), taking inspiration from the Tamil patronymic naming conventions, where the initial stood for his father's name (Puteh) and was followed by the name given to him in school (Ramlee).

== Early life and education ==
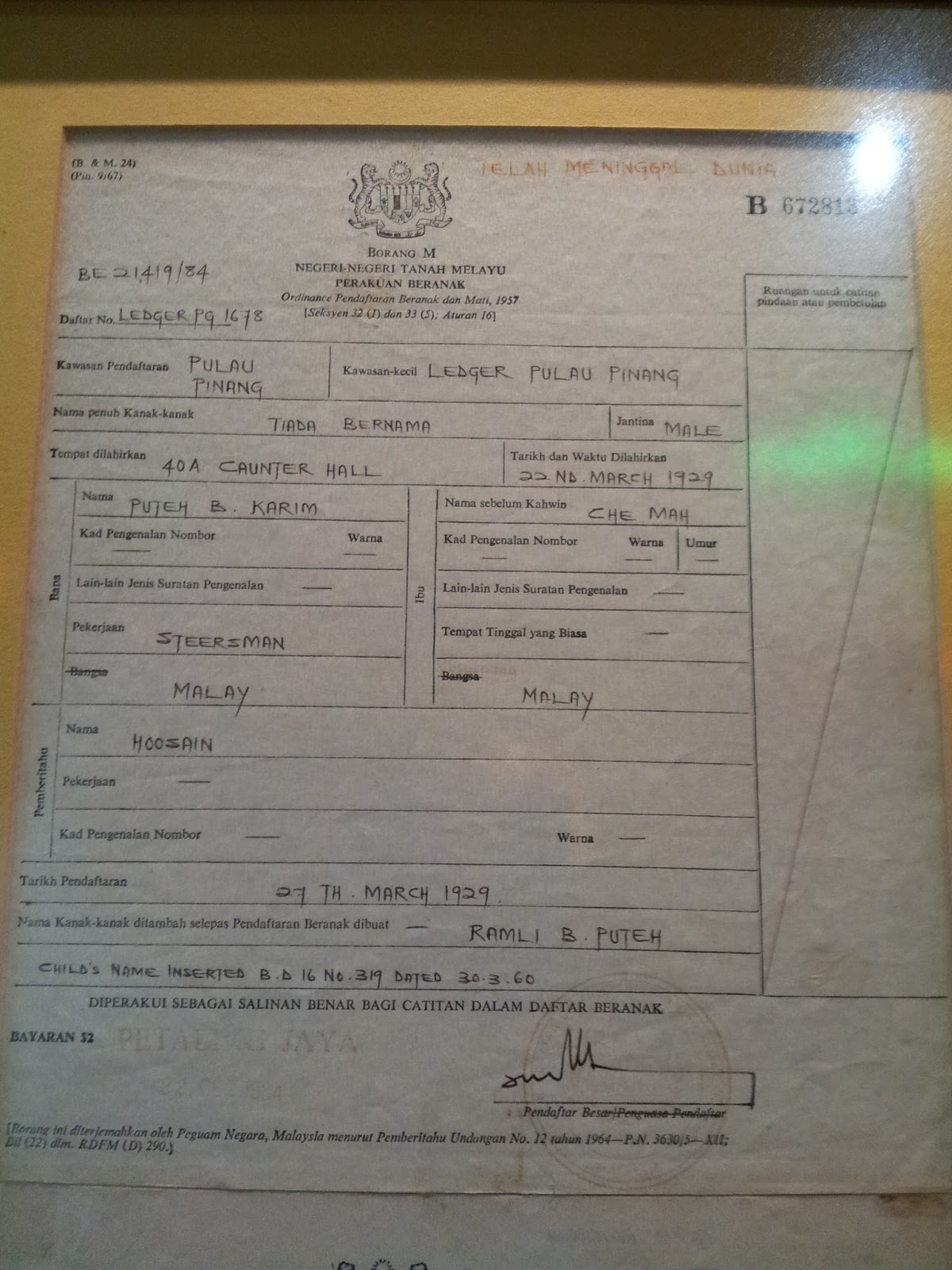
P. Ramlee's Birth Certificate

P. Ramlee was born on 22 March 1929 to Teuku Nyak Puteh Bin Teuku Karim (1902–1955) and Che Mah Binti Hussein (1904–1967). His father, Teuku Nyak Puteh, who was a descendant of an Acehnese wealthy family, migrated from Lhokseumawe, Aceh, to settle in Penang, where he married P. Ramlee’s mother, who hailed from Kubang Buaya, Butterworth, North Seberang Perai and were domiciled at the Sungai Pinang suburb of the capital, George Town (where his birthplace museum still stands today).

P. Ramlee received his education from the Sekolah Melayu Kampung Jawa (Kampung Jawa Malay School), Francis Light English School and then to Penang Free School; in all he was registered as "Ramlee" by his father, because his name Teuku Zakaria was not suitable with other children at that time. Reportedly a reluctant and naughty student, P. Ramlee was nevertheless talented and interested in music and football. His studies at the Penang Free School were interrupted by the Japanese occupation from 1942 to 1945, during which he was enrolled in the Imperial Naval Academy (Kaigun Heigakkō). He also learnt the basics of music and to sing Japanese songs during this period with his teacher, Hirahe-san. When the war ended, he took music lessons that enabled him to read musical notations, joining a marching band in his village.

== Career ==
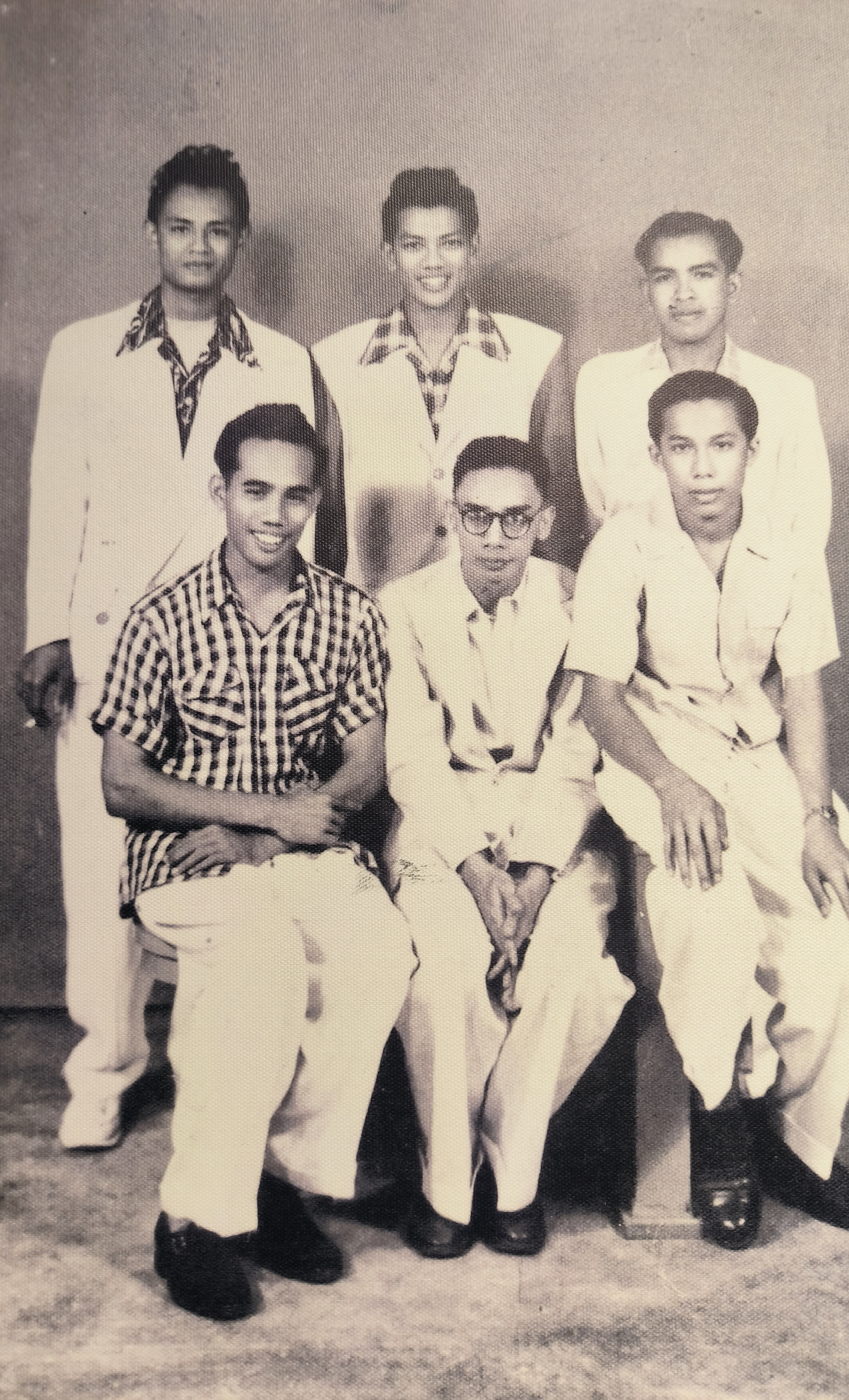
P. Ramlee and his friends upon arrival at Jalan Ampas, Singapore

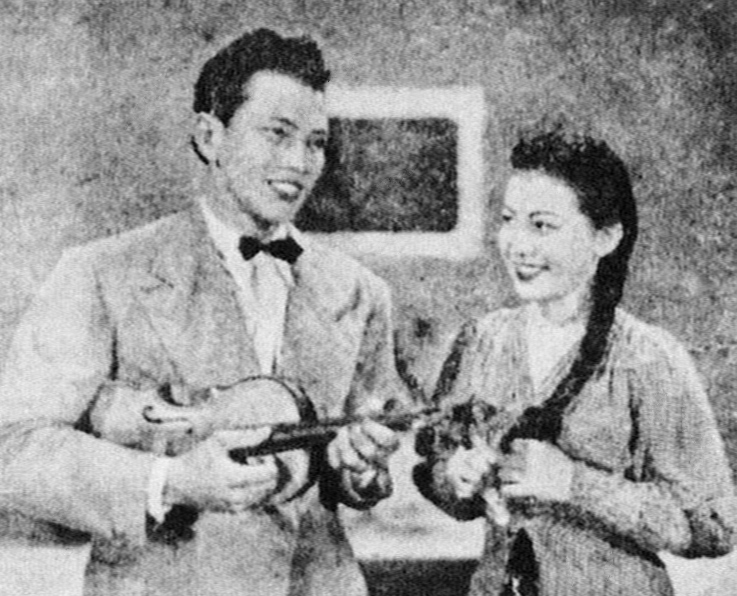
P. Ramlee and Kasma Booty, 1950

By 1948 his journey to Singapore, his first stint, the 19 year-old Ramlee had already won a number of singing competitions, and was writing his own songs and playing the violin in a kroncong band. That year, B. S. Rajhans, a film director for the Malay Film Productions (MFP) came across P. Ramlee at a singing competition hosted by Radio Malaya in Bukit Mertajam, Penang. Rajhans placed Ramlee in a supporting role in his 1948 film Chinta ("Love"), in which he played a villain, and he also performed five songs as a playback singer providing vocals for the lead actor Roomai Noor.

In 1950, Ramlee played his first major role in the film directed by L. Krishnan, Bakti ("Devotion"). In Bakti, he was the first actor to sing in his own voice instead of relying on playback singer. During the singing scene, Ramlee duet with Siti Zainab, who already appeared in four films with him. In the following films, such as Juwita in 1951 and Ibu ("Mother") in 1953, he became established as a major star of the Malay film industry.

Aside from acting, Ramlee was a prolific songwriter, and around 500 of his songs have been recorded, either by himself or by other artists. Ramlee himself recorded 359 songs for his films and records. Among his best known songs are "Getaran Jiwa", "Dendang Perantau", "Engkau Laksana Bulan", "Joget Pahang", "Tudung Periok", "Di Mana Kan Ku Cari Ganti" and "Azizah". The songs Ramlee wrote were featured in his films, performed by Ramlee himself or by other artists. In Hang Tuah (1956) which was directed by B.N. Rao, Ramlee won best musical score at the Asia-Pacific Film Festival.

P. Ramlee started directing feature films in 1955, the first of which was Penarek Becha ("Trishaw Man"). P Ramlee wrote the screenplay based on a story by Lu Xun, and the film was critically praised as the best Malay film of the year. He also directed and starred in the Bujang Lapok film comedy series. One of these, Pendekar Bujang Lapok (1959), won the Best Comedy award at the Asia-Pacific Film Festival. He also won the Best Actor award for Anak-ku Sazali at the festival. Other significant films he directed for MFP include Antara Dua Darjat, Ibu Mertua-ku and Tiga Abdul.

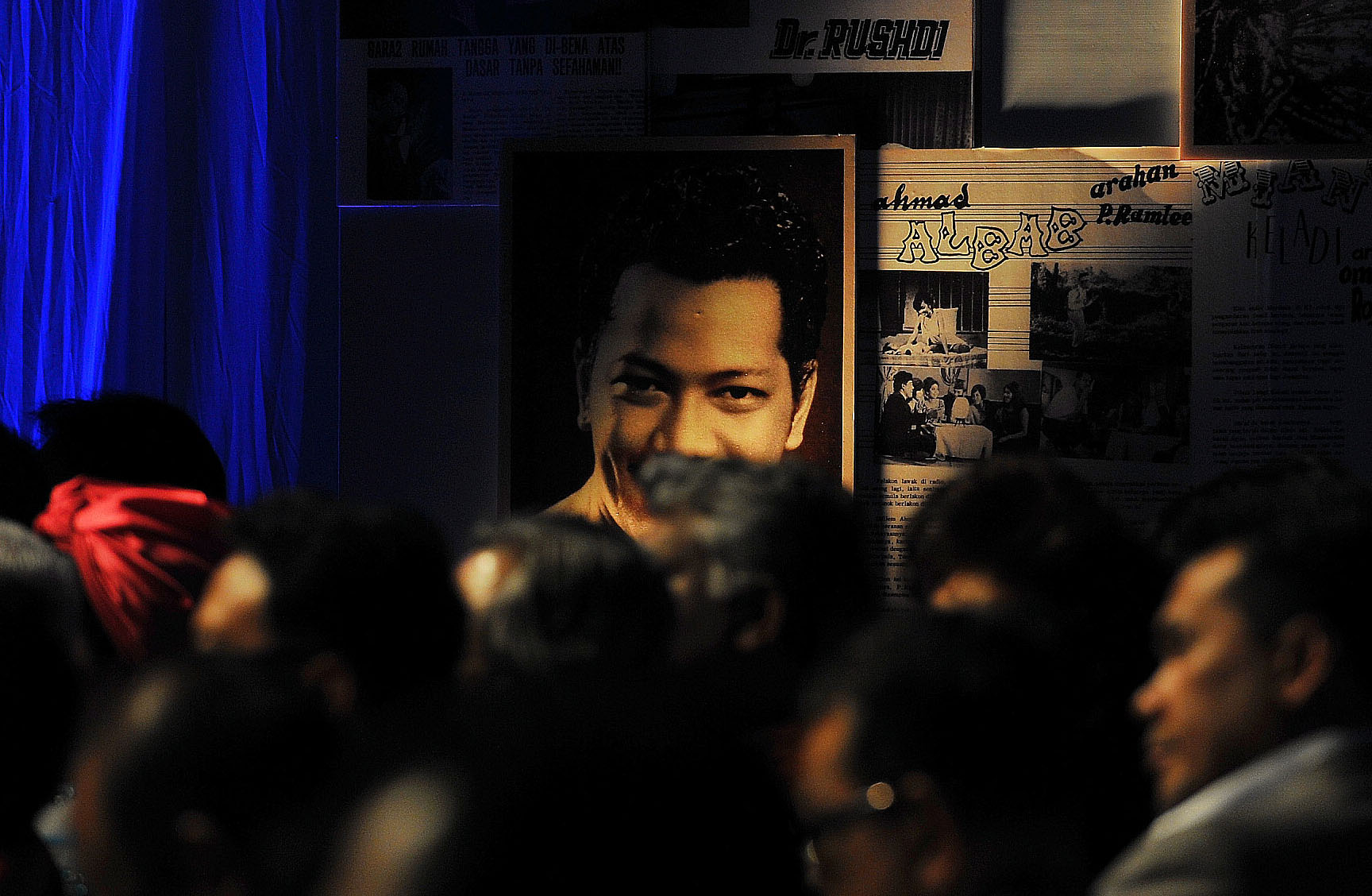
Portrait of P. Ramlee

Ramlee's career at the Malay Film Productions in Singapore between 1955 and 1964 was considered his "golden age" when he made his most critically acclaimed films and wrote his best-remembered songs. His compositions reflected a highly cosmopolitanized music landscape that was pervasive in early 20th century Malaya and Singapore, that is the accompanying music of bangsawan and ronggeng theatres plus the keroncong genre. In 1964, he left Singapore after his last film Tiga Abdul for Kuala Lumpur to make films with Merdeka Film Productions, however, he was less successful there and faced constant sabotage from other Malaysian artists.

He made 18 films with Merdeka, and his last film was Laksamana Do Re Mi made in 1972. His last song was "Ayer Mata di Kuala Lumpur" ("Tears in Kuala Lumpur") intended for a film of the same name before he died in 1973. In all, Ramlee starred in 62 films and directed 33. When Laksamana Do Re Mi was nominated at the 1973 Asia Pacific Film Festival, P. Ramlee was ignored by other Malaysian artists in attendance, and he subsequently decided to sit with Singaporean artists instead, with foreign artists (from Hong Kong and Japan) giving him more recognition as well.

== Death and legacy ==
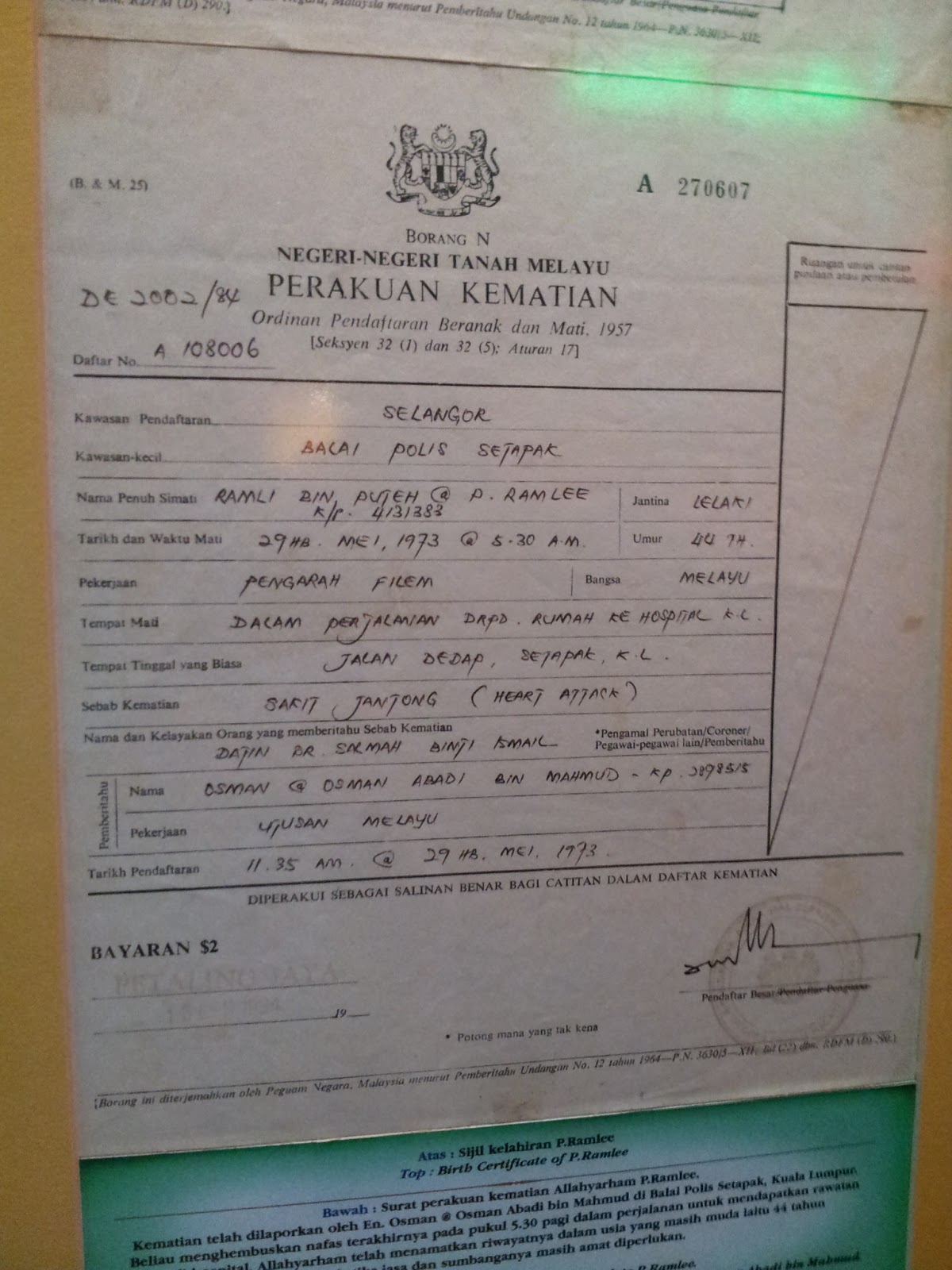
P. Ramlee's Death Certificate

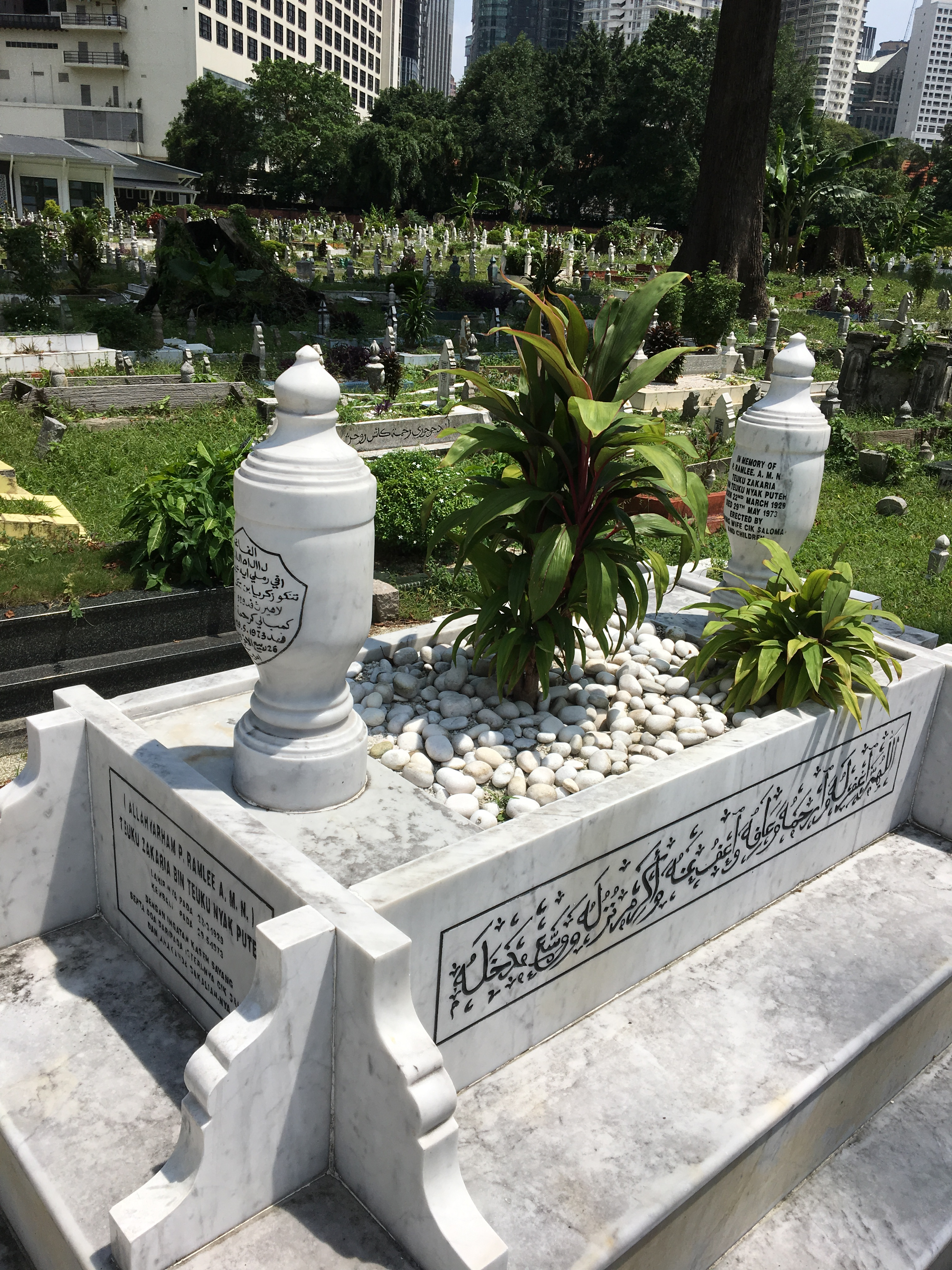
P. Ramlee's gravesite at Jalan Ampang Muslim Cemetery, Kuala Lumpur.

Before dawn of 29 May 1973, P. Ramlee died at the age of 44 from a heart attack and was buried at Jalan Ampang Muslim Cemetery in Kuala Lumpur.

At the time of his death, P. Ramlee's career was generally ignored in the Malaysian entertainment industry of the time, and had largely been denounced out of jealousy from other contemporaries. It was only during the late 1980s, two decades after his death, that his contributions became much more honoured for their significance in the late-colonial and post-independent nation-building periods they were made, partly out of deep shame and sense of pity towards discovery of said tragic final years by generations after him.

On 16 June 1983, Malaysian Prime Minister Mahathir Mohamad expressed the need to take genuinely effective measures to commemorate Ramlee's contributions as the nation's greatest artist. Mahathir referred to Ramlee as a true people's artist, stating that despite his passing a decade ago, he is still remembered by people of all ages.

In the late 1980s, the P. Ramlee Memorial or Pustaka Peringatan P. Ramlee was built in his home in Setapak, Kuala Lumpur. In 1982, the street Jalan Parry, in the center of Kuala Lumpur, was renamed Jalan P. Ramlee in his honour. In 1990, he was posthumously awarded the Malaysian honorific title Tan Sri, and then in 2009, the honorific title of "Datuk Amar" by Sarawak State Government. Then Chief Minister of Sarawak, Abdul Taib Mahmud, an avid fan of Ramlee, presented the award to his adopted daughter, Dian P. Ramlee, in a ceremony honouring veteran artists in Kuching.

The P. Ramlee House is a museum situated along Jalan P. Ramlee (formerly Caunter Hall road) in Penang, Malaysia. The building is a restored wooden house that was originally built in 1926 by his father and uncle. The house had previously undergone multiple repairs before being taken over by the National Archives as an extension of its P. Ramlee Memorial project in Kuala Lumpur. Items on display at the house include personal memorabilia related to his life in Penang and items belonging to his family.

On 22 March 2017, his 88th birthday, Google honored P. Ramlee with a Doodle on the Malaysian Google homepage.

In 2020, the film Showtime 1958 was released in Malaysia, starring Amai Kamarudin as P. Ramlee. The film documents a 1958 fundraising variety show headlined by Ramlee, and his composition of the song "Selamat Hari Raya".

In 2021, Kentucky Fried Chicken (KFC) honoured him with their limited-time menu, the Burger P. Ramlee — a combination between KFC Zinger and P. Ramlee's favourite dish, the Nasi Kandar where it is available in four combos — À'la Carte, Kombo, Set Legenda and Kombo Ikon.

== Filmography ==
P. Ramlee was involved in many aspects of his films: as scriptwriter, director, actor as well as music composer and singer. He was involved in 62 films throughout his career as an actor, as well as a number of other films in other capacities. Among his best-known films are Bujang Lapok (1957), Pendekar Bujang Lapok (1959), Antara Dua Darjat (1960), Ibu Mertua-ku (1962), Madu Tiga (1964), and Tiga Abdul (1964), many of which are regarded as classics of Malay cinema.

== Honours ==
=== Honours of Malaysia ===
- Malaysia
  - Member of the Order of the Defender of the Realm (AMN) (1962)
  - Commander of the Order of Loyalty to the Crown of Malaysia (PSM) – Tan Sri (1990; posthumously)
  - P. Ramlee was posthumously granted the sobriquet Seniman Agung.
- Sarawak
  - Knight Commander of the Order of the Star of Hornbill Sarawak (DA) – Datuk Amar (2009; posthumously)

== Entities named after P. Ramlee ==
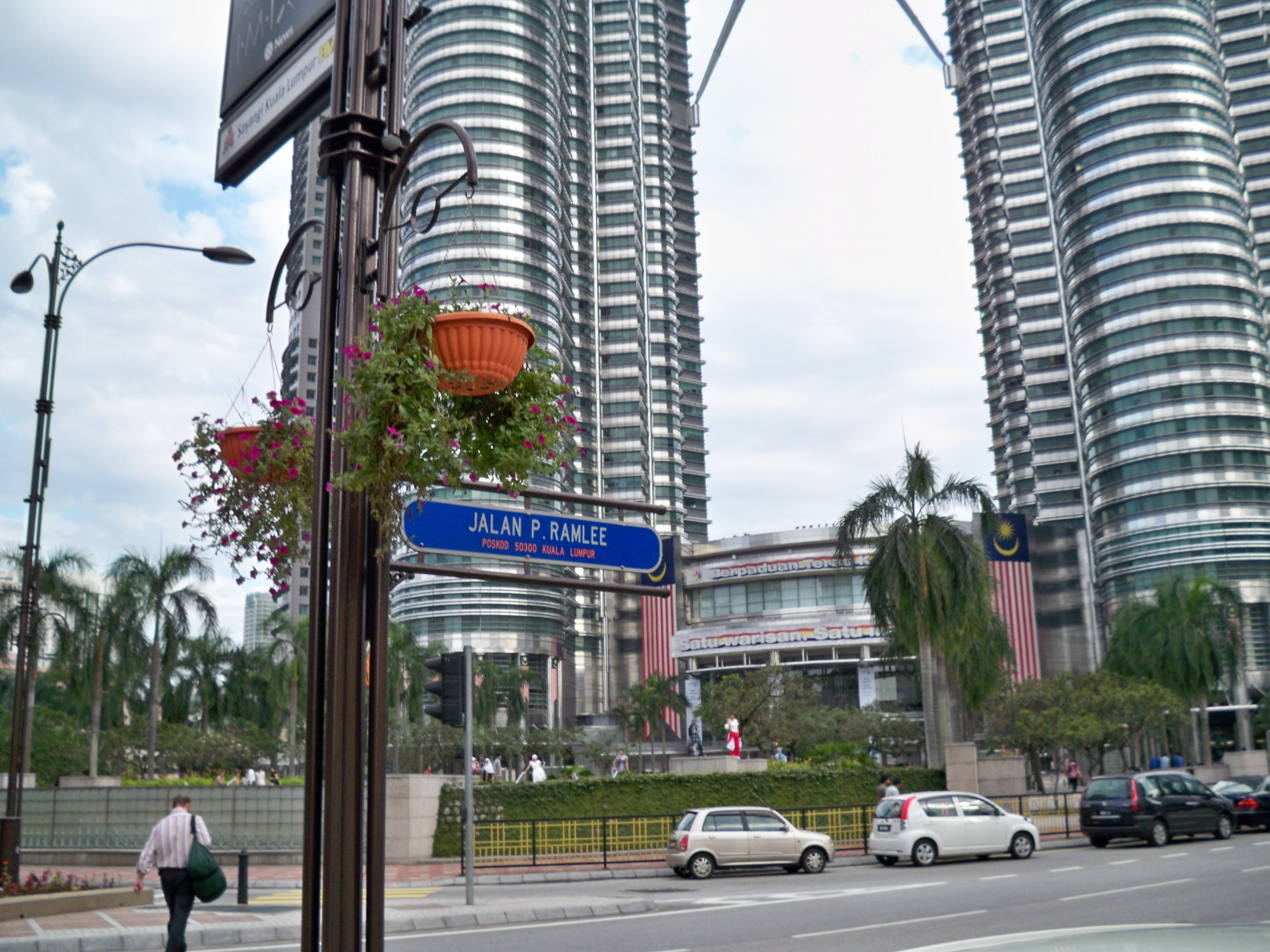
P. Ramlee Street in Kuala Lumpur

Various places are named after P. Ramlee

- Jalan P. Ramlee, Penang (formerly known as Caunter Hall; renamed on 30 August 1983)
- Jalan P. Ramlee, Kuala Lumpur (formerly known as Jalan Parry; renamed in 1982)
- Bangunan P. Ramlee and Bilik Mesyuarat Tan Sri P. Ramlee at Sekolah Kebangsaan Hulu Klang, Selangor (used as background in Masam Masam Manis)
- Jalan P. Ramlee, Kuching, Sarawak (formerly known as Jalan Jawa)
- Taman P. Ramlee (formerly Taman Furlong) a townships at Setapak, Kuala Lumpur and George Town, Penang
- Pawagam Mini P. Ramlee at Studio Merdeka, FINAS, Ulu Klang, Selangor
- Makmal P.Ramlee at Filem Negara Malaysia, Petaling Jaya, Selangor
- P. Ramlee Auditorium (formerly known as RTM Auditorium), Angkasapuri
- SK Tan Sri P. Ramlee, George Town, Penang (formerly SK Kampung Jawa, his alma mater; renamed on 13 November 2011)
- Ramlee Mall at Suria KLCC shopping centre, Kuala Lumpur
- Bukit Nanas Monorail station, Kuala Lumpur, formerly known as P. Ramlee Monorail station
- Auditorium P. Ramlee, RTM Kuching, Sarawak
