= Malay Film Productions =

Singapore film studio

Malay Film Productions Ltd.
- Type: Public
- Industry: Film production
- Founded: 1943; 83 years ago in Singapore
- Defunct: 1967; 59 years ago
- Fate: Dissolved
- Headquarters: 8 Jalan Ampas, Singapore
- Owners: Runme Shaw; Run Run Shaw
- Parent: Shaw Organisation

The Malay Film Productions Ltd., also known as the Shaw Studio, is a former film studio located on Jalan Ampas in Balestier, Singapore. The studio operated from 1947 to 1969 with more than 150 movies produced, and was a major contributor to Singapore's "golden age" of Malay cinema. Many of the films are critically acclaimed, a significant number of which involved P. Ramlee as actor, director, writer or composer.

Many of the films made by MFP have since been considered lost.

== History ==
=== Origin ===
The Shaw brothers had established a chain of cinemas in Malaya and Singapore by the 1930s, and were interested in producing films for the local market after they saw the success of a Malay film titled Laila Majnum by Indian director B. S. Rajhans in 1934. They announced plans for film production in Malay in 1937, and a site in Gopeng, Perak was reported to have been found as studio to make a film titled Jula Juli Bintang Tiga. Equipment was imported from Hong Kong, and film directors were recruited to make films with a local Malay cast in Malaya, although it is unclear if any films were released in this period. In 1940, a studio was set up on Moulmein Road in Singapore, and the first Singapore-made Malay film, Mutiara, was produced by Shaw with Malay actors and Chinese directors Hou Yao and Wan Hoi Ling. Seven Malay films were released in all by the directors.

Plans for expansion with the construction of a new film studio on No.8 Jalan Ampas in Balestier were first announced by John Laycock, representing the Shaw Organisation, on 17 June 1941. The location on Jalan Ampas was originally a warehouse occupied by Indian washermen, who were ejected from the premises by 31 August 1941. The film studio facility was initially named Singapore Film Studios, before becoming the Malay Film Productions (MFP) in 1943, but it was not formally incorporated until 23 August 1949. The new studio was originally intended to produce films in Malay and Cantonese and establish a newsreel service, but the Japanese invasion in 1942 halted the plan and no films were produced.

=== Early film productions at Jalan Ampas ===
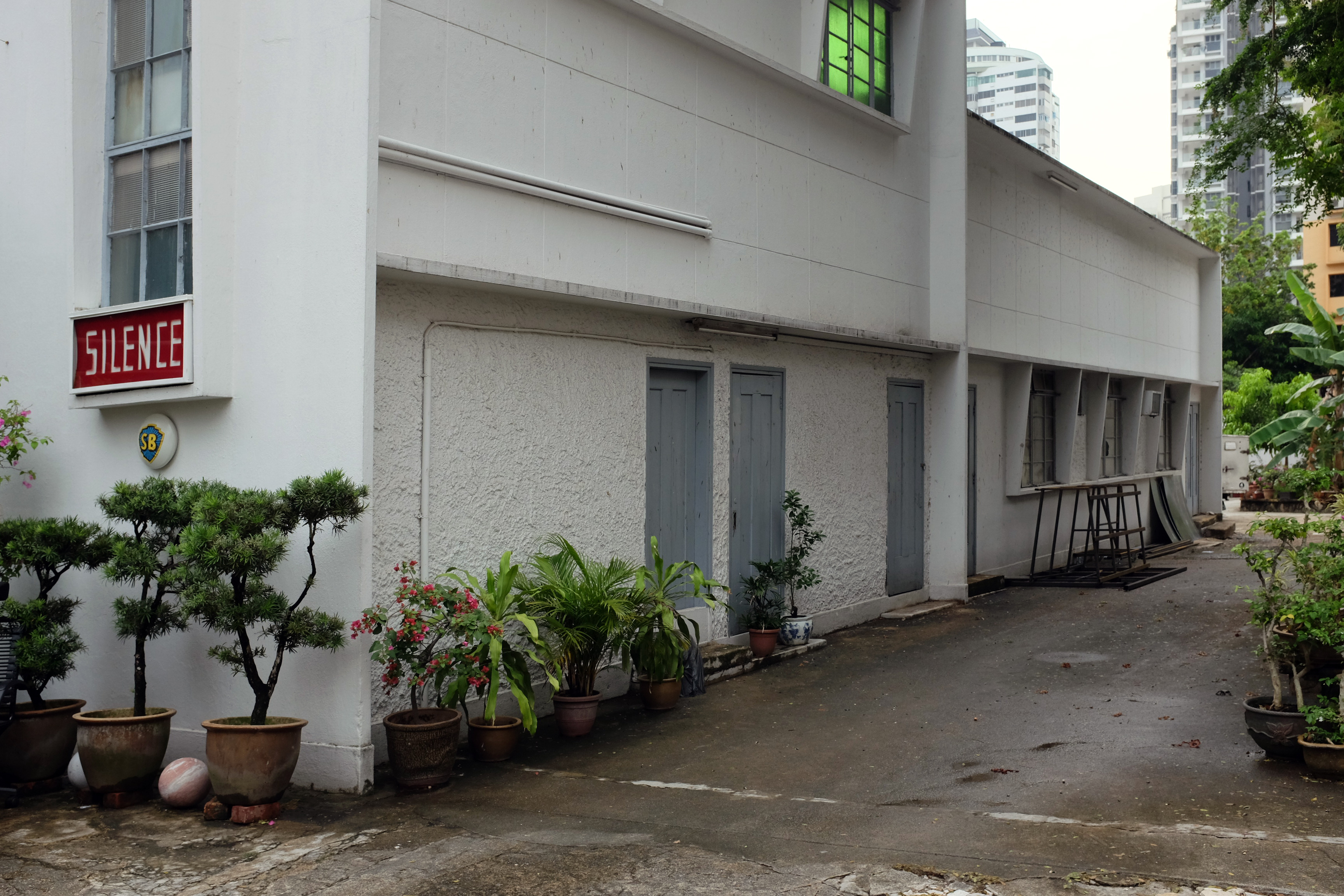
The studio building in 2015

The Jalan Ampas studio reopened after World War 2 in 1947. Instead of Chinese directors previously used, the Indian director B. S. Rajhans was chosen to lead the studio, and he was its only film director until 1950, with eight films produced in this period. Rajhans made films based on Indian myths and folklore as well as on contemporary societal issues. The first film released by the studio in 1947 was Singapura di Waktu Malam ("Night Time in Singapore"), a film which explores the social issues of Malay youths who left the kampongs for the city.

The early films of Rajhans proved successful, and the success led to further recruitment of two more Indian filmmakers: S. Ramanathan and L. Krishnan. Many of the films by Indian directors had strong Indian influence, and the Indian directors were better suited to Malay culture, furthermore their song-and-dance film style was also popular with audience of different ethnicities. Instead of relying on Bangsawan actors, Rajnans also started to scout for Malay talent who would become significant figures in the Malay film industry, including Jamil Sulong and Omar Rojik. The most important figure he recruited was P. Ramlee, who would become a key figure in Malay popular entertainment. The first film Ramlee appeared in was the 1948 film Chinta ("Love"), where he played the villain and performed five songs as a playback singer, providing the vocals for the lead actor Roomai Noor.

The studio expanded quickly, and by 1948, the studio was using up-to-date sound recording apparatus and motion picture cameras from the United States, and had 160 permanent staff.

=== Heyday ===
The MFP had a virtual monopoly of Malay films in the early days, and film production increased rapidly. The studio reached its peak in the 1950s, when it was producing over 10 films a year, with the most being in 1952 when it made 13 films. The increase in production in the 1950s led to the expansion of the studio into neighbouring plots of land for the construction of new sound stages, with quarters on Boon Teck Road where its employees were housed. The original studio on 8 Jalan Ampas were also rebuilt. Two filmmaking units, A and B, were formed, and they used the studio in turns; if unit A was filming in the studio, unit B would do the filming outdoors. The processing of the film was also located at Jalan Ampas. Each film was budgeted at around Malayan $30,000 (around US$10,000), and from its conception to its release, each film can usually be completed in three months. By 1958, the studio had produced over a hundred movies, some of which won awards at Asian film festivals.

Other film directors recruited in the 1950s included B.N. Rao and Filipino director Ramon A. Estella. Several Malay directors including Hussein Haniff and scriptwriters were also employed to direct films that were more attuned to Malay culture, although the first film by a Malay director, Permata Di Perlimbahan by Haji Mahadi, was not a success. Rao popularised the supernatural and horror genre with the film Roh Membela ("Revenge of the Spirit") in 1955. L Krishnan left after directing 8 films for MFP to help found a rival studio, the Cathay-Keris Film Productions, in 1954, and Rao also left in 1956. Rao was replaced by Phani Majumdar, who directed Rumah Panjang ("The Long House") filmed in Borneo, and the big-budget film Hang Tuah, considered one of the most significant Malay films ever produced in that period. Hang Tuah was nominated for the Golden Bear at the 7th Berlin International Film Festival, and won best musical score (P Ramlee) at the Asian Pacific Film Festival.

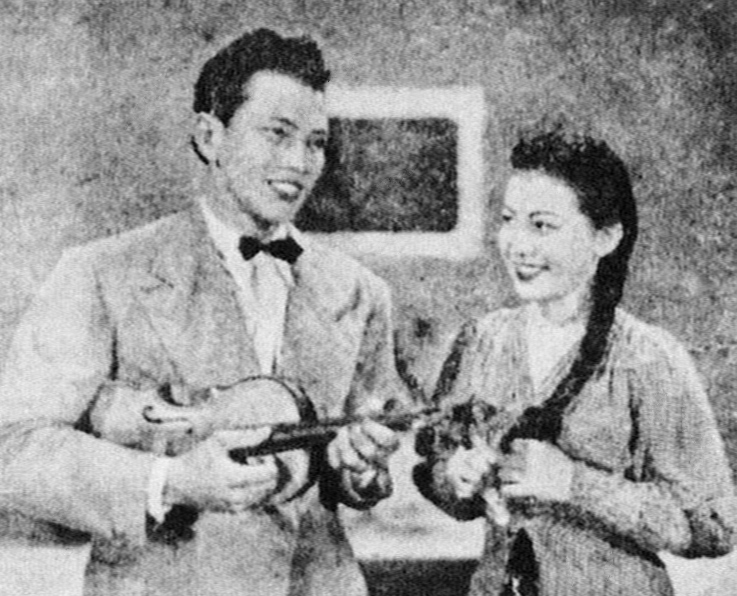
P. Ramlee and Kasma Booty, 1950

P Ramlee quickly became the most important star of the MFP. Ramlee appeared in his first leading role in the 1950 film Bakti ("Devotion"), which was Krisnan's first Malay film, with story based on Wuthering Heights and Les Misérables. He was the first actor to sing in his own voice in the film Bakti. In his following films such as Juwita in 1951 and Ibu ("Mother") in 1953, he firmly established himself as a major star. Ramlee directed his first feature film Penarek Becha ("Trishaw Man") in 1955, which was a success. He also started the Bujang Lapok comedy series in 1957; one of these, Pendekar Bujang Lapok, won the Best Comedy award at the Asia Pacific Film Festival.

=== 1957 labour strike ===
In 1954, many of the employees of the studio formed Persama (Persatuan Artis Malaya, the Malayan Artists Union), with P Ramlee its first president. In 1957 they demanded increases in their wage, payment for overtime, half-day work on Saturdays with Sundays off, as well as bigger bonuses for each completed film. The leading actors at that time were paid on average $250 a month, and leading actresses were paid $150 a month, with a bonus of $400–500 for each completed film, while supporting actors and actresses were paid between $80–120 a month, and were given a bonus of $150 for each completed film. However, Shaw did not respond to the list of demands submitted by the union.

In March, five employees of the studio, Syed Hassan Al-Sahab, Musalmah, S. Kadarisman, H. M. Rohaizad and Omar Rojik, all of whom were part of the union, were dismissed. Ramlee asked for Tunku Abdul Rahman to intervene, while 120 employees of the studio went on strike on 16 March 1957, despite warnings from management that anyone who went on strike would be laid off. A concert, the "Malam Suka Duka", was held at the Gay World Stadium to raise funds for the strike.

Following the strike a meeting for a negotiation, which was advised by the Tunku, was held, during which the Shaw Organisation revealed that it had not been making a profit from producing movies in years. The union made an appeal to the Menteri Besar of the nine Federation states for support in the dispute over the dismissal over the five employees. The strike ended on 8 April 1957, after the reinstatement of the five actors and actresses. Following the end of the strike, work on the film Pancha Delima, which had been put on hold due to the strike, resumed. An agreement for the new wage for 36 employees was reached in April 1963.

In November 1964, the union gave an ultimatum to the studio, stating that it had to settle the wages of 70 technicians employed at the studio. Following this, employees of the studio went on strike again on 8 December 1964. The strike ended on 29 January 1965, after the mediation of a third party resulted in agreements made during negotiations.

=== Closure ===
In the 1960s, the studio suffered heavily from the increasing wages of employees, competition from the Cathay-Keris Studio, popularity of foreign films, and an increasing public interest in television. Film production slowed down, and several stars, such as P. Ramlee and Kasma Booty, also moved to Malaysia in 1964 to seek better opportunities. The Shaw Organisation moved its headquarters to Malaysia in 1964, and by October 1965, 105 actors, actresses and technicians had been retrenched. In 1967, the Jalan Ampas studio was closed down, and the company voluntarily liquidated.

The last film made at the Jalan Ampas studio by MFP, Raja Bersiong released in 1968, was a lavish production that nevertheless failed at the box office. Three Malay films were shot in Hong Kong after the Jalan Ampas studio closed. By the time the studio ceased production, 162 Malay films had been produced.

== Filmography ==
The studio produced more than 150 movies from 1947 to 1969. A number of early Malay films were also produced under the Shaw Brothers banner in 1937–1941 before they formed MFP. A small number was filmed in Hong Kong after the Singapore studio closed.
