= List of Singaporean films before 1990 =

This is a list of the earliest films produced and released before 1990 in Singapore. For an alphabetical listing of Singaporean films, see Category:Singaporean films.

== 1920s to 1930s ==
Date	Title	Director	Producer	Production Cost	Singapore Gross	Ref.
1927
4 March / 29 April 1927	The New Immigrant/New Friend (新客/唐山來客)	Guo Chaowen	Nanyang Low Poey Kim Motion Picture Co.			
1934
27 March 1934	Leila Majnun	B. S. Rajhans	Motilal Chemical Co. (Bombay)			

== 1940s ==
Date	Title	Director	Producer	Production Cost	Singapore Gross	Ref.
1940
20 July 1940	Mutiara	Hou Yao, Wan Hoi Ling	Shaw Brothers			
26 November 1940	Bermadu (Polygamy)	Hou Yao, Wan Hoi Ling	Shaw Brothers			
1941
9 April 1941	Toping Saitan (The Devil's Mask)	Hou Yao, Wan Hoi Ling	Shaw Brothers			
1 July 1941	Hancor Hati (Broken-hearted)	Hou Yao, Wan Hoi Ling	Shaw Brothers			
27 September 1941	Ibu Tiri (Step-Mother)	Hou Yao, Wan Hoi Ling	Shaw Brothers			
21 October 1941	Terang Bulan Di Malaya (Full Moon in Malaya)	Hou Yao, Wan Hoi Ling	Shaw Brothers			
1943
1943	Tiga Kekaseh (Three Lovers)	Hou Yao, Wan Hoi Ling	Shaw Brothers			
1946
1946	Menantu Derhaka (The Rebellious Daughter-in-Law)	B. S. Rajhans	Tan & Wong Film Co.			
1946	Blood and Tears of the Overseas Chinese (华侨血泪)	Cai Wen-jin	Chung Hwa Film Production Company			
5 December 1946	Spirit of Overseas Chinese (海外征魂)	Wan Hoi Ling	China Motion Picture Studio			
1947
16 August 1947	Seruan Merdeka (Cry of Freedom)	B. S. Rajhans	Malayan Arts Productions			
8 October 1947	Honour and Sin / Miss Nanyang (南洋小姐)	Wan Hoi Ling	China Motion Picture Studio			
15 November 1947	Singapura Diwaktu Malam (Night Time in Singapore)	B. S. Rajhans	Malay Film Productions			
1948
1948	Chempaka (Franjipani)	B. S. Rajhans	Malay Film Productions			
1948	Pisau Berachun (Poisonous Knife)	B. S. Rajhans	Malay Film Productions			
October 1948	Chinta	B. S. Rajhans	Malay Film Productions			
1949
1949	Nasib (Fate)	B. S. Rajhans	Malay Film Productions			
1949	Nilam	B. S. Rajhans	Malay Film Productions			
9 April 1949	Noor Asmara (Light of Love)	B. S. Rajhans	Malay Film Productions			

== 1950s ==
1950
Date	Title	Director	Producer	Production Cost	Singapore Gross	Ref.
1950	Bakti (Faithfulness)	L. Krishnan	Malay Film Productions			
1950	Dewi Murni (Goddess of Purity)	B. S. Rajhans	Malay Film Productions			
1950	Kembar (Twins)	S. Ramanathan	Malay Film Productions			
1950	Pelangi (Rainbow)	Naz Achnas	Nusantara Film			
1950	Penghidupan (Life)	L. Krishnan	Malay Film Productions			
1950	Rachun Dunia (Poison World)	B. S. Rajhans	Malay Film Productions			
1950	Sesal Tak Sudah (Neverending Regret)	A. R. Tompel	Nusantara Film			
1950	Takdir Ilahi (The Will of God)	L. Krishnan	Malay Film Productions			
December 1950	Aloha	B. S. Rajhans	Malay Film Productions			
