= Nasib =

1949 Singaporean film

- Directed by: B. S. Rajhans
- Starring: S. Roomai Noor; Siput Sarawak; Daeng Harris; P. Ramlee
- Music by: Osman Ahmad
- Production company: Shaw Brothers Studio
- Release date: July 1949
- Running time: 91 minutes
- Country: Singapore
- Language: Malay

Nasib (Fate) is a 1949 Singaporean Malay-language black-and-white romantic drama film directed by B. S. Rajhans; it stars S. Roomai Noor, Siput Sarawak, Daeng Harris, and P. Ramlee. The film was one of eight popular productions made by the Shaw Brothers Studio in the 1940s.

== Plot ==
Kassim is banished from his home by his elder brother and sister-in-law, who plotted to keep the family inheritance to themselves. Kassim and his two close friends attempt to make a living by fishing at sea. But their boat topples over and they drift to a secluded island. There, they chance upon a pirates’ lair in a cave and seize the ill-gotten treasure that the pirates had hidden.

== Cast ==
- S. Roomai Noor as Kasim
- Siput Sarawak as Princess Rohana
- Daeng Harris as Puteh
- Momo Latiff as Chorus girl
- Nona Asiah as Chorus girl
- P. Ramlee as Baki
- Haji Gong as Kalam
- Jaafar Wiryo as Pirate chief
- Tina as Zainab
- Normala as Delima
- Panna as Maid
- Zainab as Maid
- Junaidah as Maid

== Production ==
This black-and-white film was directed by B. S. Rajhans for Shaw Brothers Studio. Filming lasted six months in their studios on Ampas Road and on location in neighbouring islands and rural areas in Singapore and British Malaya. This film stars S. Roomai Noor and Siput Sarawak in a leading role. The cast includes Daeng Harris, Momo Latiff, Nona Asiah, and P. Ramlee in a supporting role. The Indonesian actress Zainab made her Singapore film debut in Nasib in the role of a singer and dancer.

== Release and reception ==
Nasib was released in July 1949 in Singapore. The film, one of eight popular films produced by the Shaw Brothers Studio in the 1940s., was "well received".

== Citations ==
=== Works cited ===
- Pratista, Himawan; Nugroho, Agustinus Dwi; Press, Montase. Kompilasi Buletin Film Montase: Volume 3 (in Indonesian). Montase Press. ISBN 978-602-61314-4-7.
