= Pendekar Bujang Lapok =

1959 film by P. Ramlee

- Directed by: P. Ramlee
- Written by: P. Ramlee
- Screenplay by: P. Ramlee
- Story by: P. Ramlee
- Produced by: Run Run Shaw
- Starring: P. Ramlee; S. Shamsuddin; Aziz Sattar
- Cinematography: A. Bakar Ali
- Edited by: H.R. Narayanan
- Music by: P. Ramlee
- Production company: Malay Film Productions
- Distributed by: Shaw Organization
- Release date: 1959
- Running time: 104 minutes
- Country: Singapore
- Language: Malay

Pendekar Bujang Lapok (English: The Three Over-age Bachelor Warriors) is a 1959 Singaporean Malay-language black-and-white comedy film directed by P. Ramlee. It is the second in the Bujang Lapok series of films, and stars the trio of P. Ramlee, S. Shamsuddin and Aziz Sattar, all of which was filmed on site at Jalan Ampas, Singapore.

Although the three main characters have the same names, actors and personalities as the previous Bujang Lapok film, it is not a direct sequel as there are no canonical references to the events in its predecessor.

In October 2014, The Straits Times ranked Pendekar Bujang Lapok as one of the top five Malay films made in Singapore, noting that it won the Best Comedy award at the 6th Asian Film Festival in 1959.

== Plot ==
Ramli, Ajis, and Sudin are a trio of bujang lapok (confirmed bachelors) waiting at a jetty operated by a wealthy man named Ahmad Nisfu, who employs thugs to control access to the ferry service. When an elderly martial arts master, Pendekar Mustar, arrives and is mistreated by the thugs, he defeats them single-handedly. Impressed by his skills, the trio decide to follow him and become his students. They create a distraction, commandeer a boat, and make their way to Kampung Pinang Sebatang.

On their journey, they encounter a young woman named Rosmah and follow her home, which turns out to be the residence of Pendekar Mustar. Initially cautious, the master welcomes them after learning of their admiration. Rosmah, his daughter, is displeased by the unexpected guests. The trio attempt to gain her favour, eventually succeeding with a song. When Rosmah writes them a letter, they reveal their illiteracy by asking the housekeeper, Aini, to read it. This prompts Pendekar Mustar to enrol them in school, where Rosmah is their teacher. Although embarrassed, the trio continue their studies despite ridicule from younger students.

After learning to read and write, they successfully recite a mantra and begin formal silat training. They attempt to court Rosmah by feigning damage to their clothes. Ahmad Nisfu later arrives to demand compensation for the earlier incident and proposes marriage to Rosmah, who rejects him. He leaves vowing revenge.

The next day, Pendekar Mustar sends the trio to meditate in isolated locations. While they are away, Ahmad Nisfu's thugs ambush Pendekar Mustar, abduct Rosmah, and tie up the household members. Aini is rescued by her fiancé, Bang Brahim, and she frees the others. They then seek the trio's help. Initially believing the situation to be another test, the trio delay acting, but soon realise the threat is real.

They confront the thugs: Ramli defeats the leader in combat while Ajis and Sudin outsmart the remaining assailants. Rosmah is rescued and expresses her gratitude. Back at home, Pendekar Mustar commends the trio’s courage and formally bestows upon them the title "Pendekar Bujang Lapok."

== Cast ==
- P. Ramlee as Ramli
- Aziz Sattar as Ajis
- S. Shamsuddin as Sudin
- Roseyatimah as Rose
- Hj. Mustar bin Ahmad a.k.a. Mustarjo as Pendekar Mustar
- Momo Latiff as Pendekar's wife
- Aini Jasmin as Aini
- Ibrahim Pendek as Abang Brahim
- Ahmad Nisfu as Rich man or Sampan Towkay/ River Jetty Boss
- Shariff Dol as Sharif, Ketua Samseng/ Leader of the thugs
- Ali Fiji as Ali (Samseng/thug)
- Kemat Hassan as Kemat (Samseng/thug)
- A. Rahim as Rahim (Samseng/thug)
- Ahmad C as Ahmad (Samseng/thug)
- Omar Suwita as Omar (Samseng/thug)
- M. Rafee as Rafi (Samseng/thug)
- Sarban Singh
- Ahmad Chetty

== Songs ==
- Pok Pok Pok, Bujang Lapok (The Bujang Lapok Theme Song)
- Maafkan Kami (Forgive Us)
- Malam Bulan di Pagar Bintang (The Moonlight in the Edge of the Stars)
