= Persaudaraan Setia Hati Terate =

Sport and pencak silat organization in Indonesia

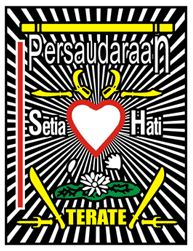
- Official logo

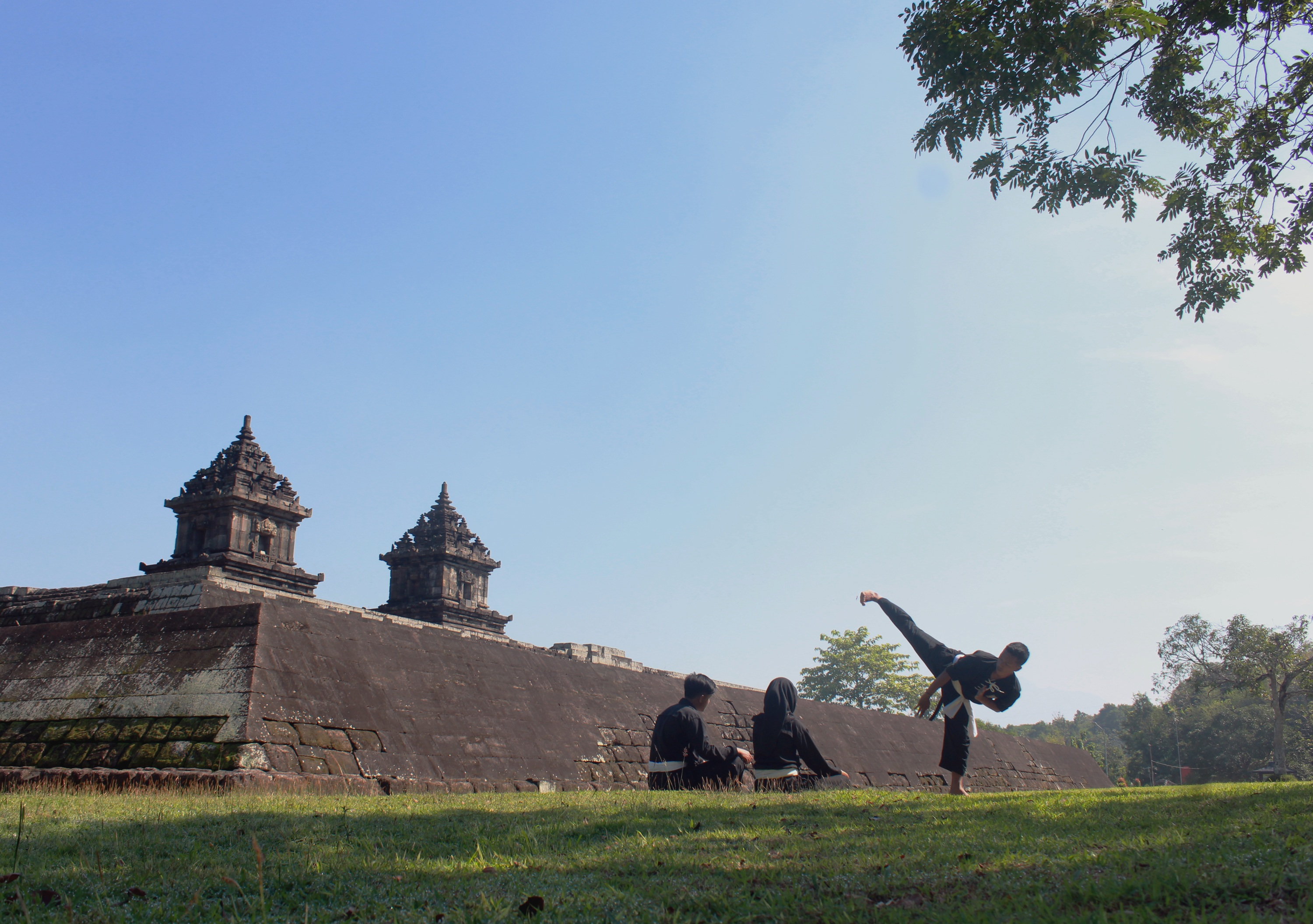
- Kicking style of PSHT
- Also known as: PSHT, SH Terate
- Focus: Striking and Kicking
- Hardness: Full-contact
- Country of origin: Indonesia
- Date of formation: 1922
- Creator: Ki Hadjar Hardjo Oetomo
- Ancestor arts: Setia Hati
- Olympic sport: No

Persaudaraan Setia Hati Terate (lit. 'Brotherhood of the Obedient Heart — Lotus', abbreviated as PSHT or SH Terate) is a sports and pencak silat organization (perguruan silat) from East Java, Indonesia, created by Ki Hadjar Hardjo Oetomo in 1922 and was later agreed to be renamed to Persaudaraan Setia Hati Terate at its first congress in Madiun in 1948.

PSHT is one of the martial arts organizations that founded Ikatan Pencak Silat Indonesia (IPSI) on 18 May 1948. Currently PSHT has around 7 million members, has branches in 236 regencies/cities in Indonesia, 10 overseas commissariats in Malaysia, the Netherlands, Russia (Moscow), East Timor, Hong Kong, South Korea, Japan, Belgium, and France.

However, in recent years, many of PSHT members have involved in mobs, riots and other forms of violence, especially with members of other similar organizations, including its now-rival Persaudaraan Setia Hati Tunas Muda Winongo (PSHW). Due to a mob attack against police officer Parmanto, its Jember branch was suspended by the local police on 26 July 2024. However, the suspension has been lifted since the dismissal of 13 involved members on 5 December.

== History ==
In 1903, Ki Ageng Soerodiwirjo laid the groundwork for a pencak silat Setia Hati style in Tambak Gringsing village, Surabaya, Indonesia. Previously, he called the martial arts style as "Djojo Gendilo Tjipto Muljo" with the brotherhood system called "Sedulur Tunggal Ketjer". In 1917, he moved to Madiun and establish Persaudaraan Setia Hati in Winongo village, Madiun, Indonesia.

In 1922, Ki Hadjar Hardjo Oetomo, a follower of the Setia Hati style from Pilangbango, Madiun, ask permission of Soerodiwirjo to establish a martial arts school with the Setia Hati style. Soerodiwirjo agreed with this idea as long as the school later had to have a different name. Finally, Oetomo formed SH PSC (Persaudaraan Setia Hati "Pemuda Sport Club"). This education system was then called Persaudaraan Setia Hati Terate or PSHT in 1948 during the first congress in Madiun.

== Notable members ==
- Ki Hadjar Hardjo Oetomo
- Edhie Baskoro Yudhoyono
- Hartanto Edhie Wibowo
- Richard Simorangkir
- Imam Nahrawi (honor of the pendekar)
- Herman Deru (honor of the pendekar)
- Totok Imam Santoso
- Andjar Wiratma (honor of the pendekar)
- Istu Hari Subagio (honor of the pendekar)

== Gallery ==
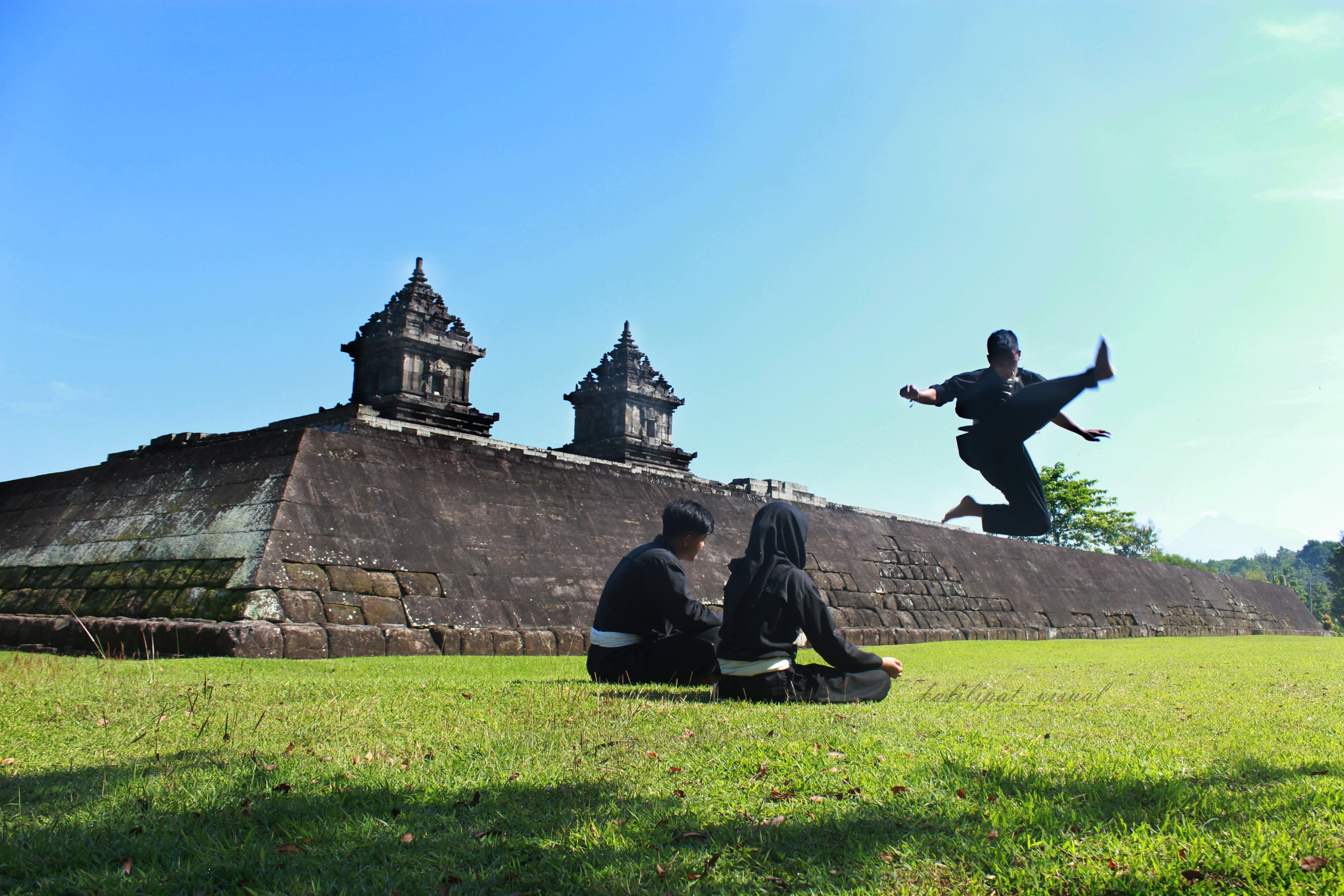
Flying kick

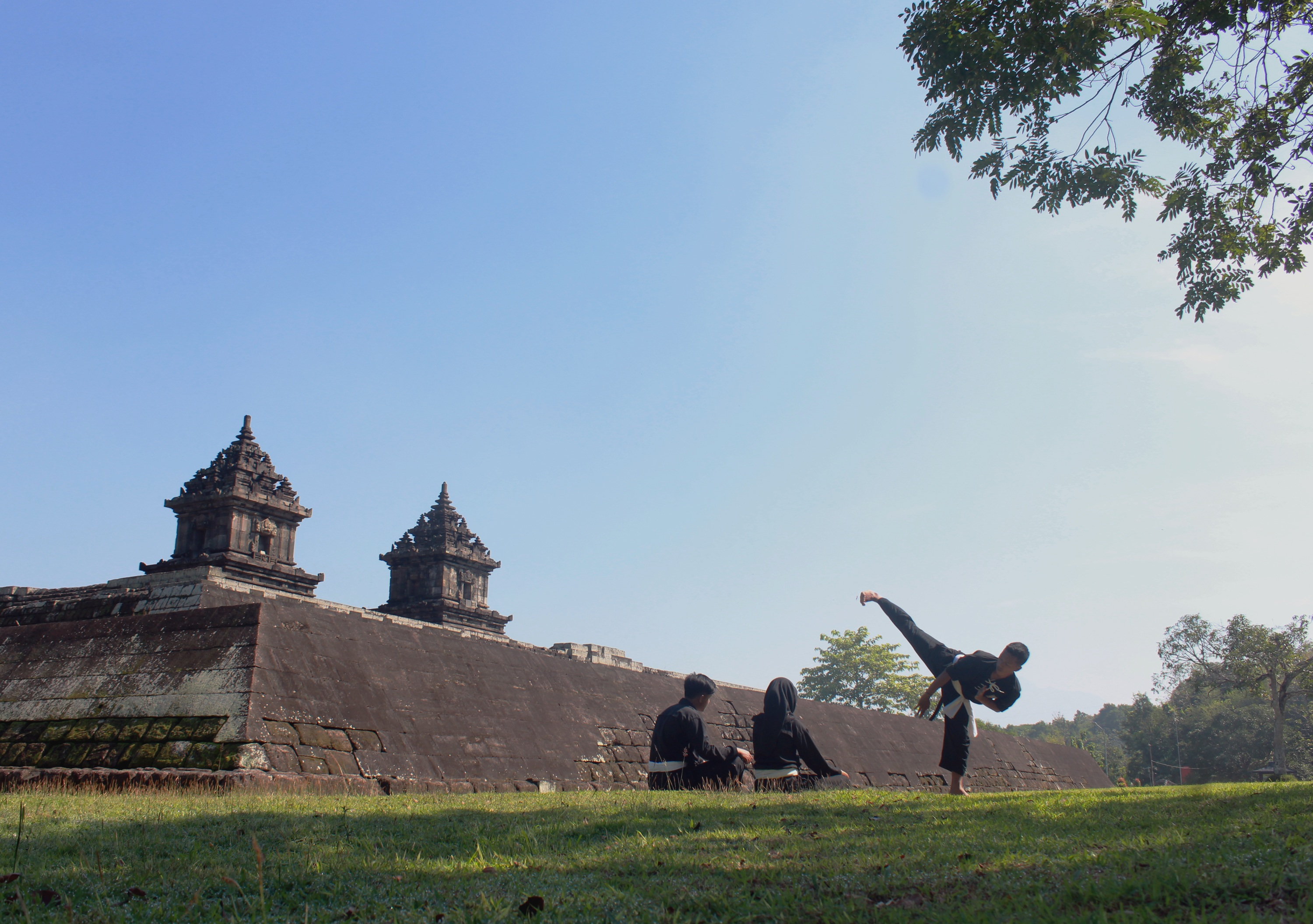
Kick

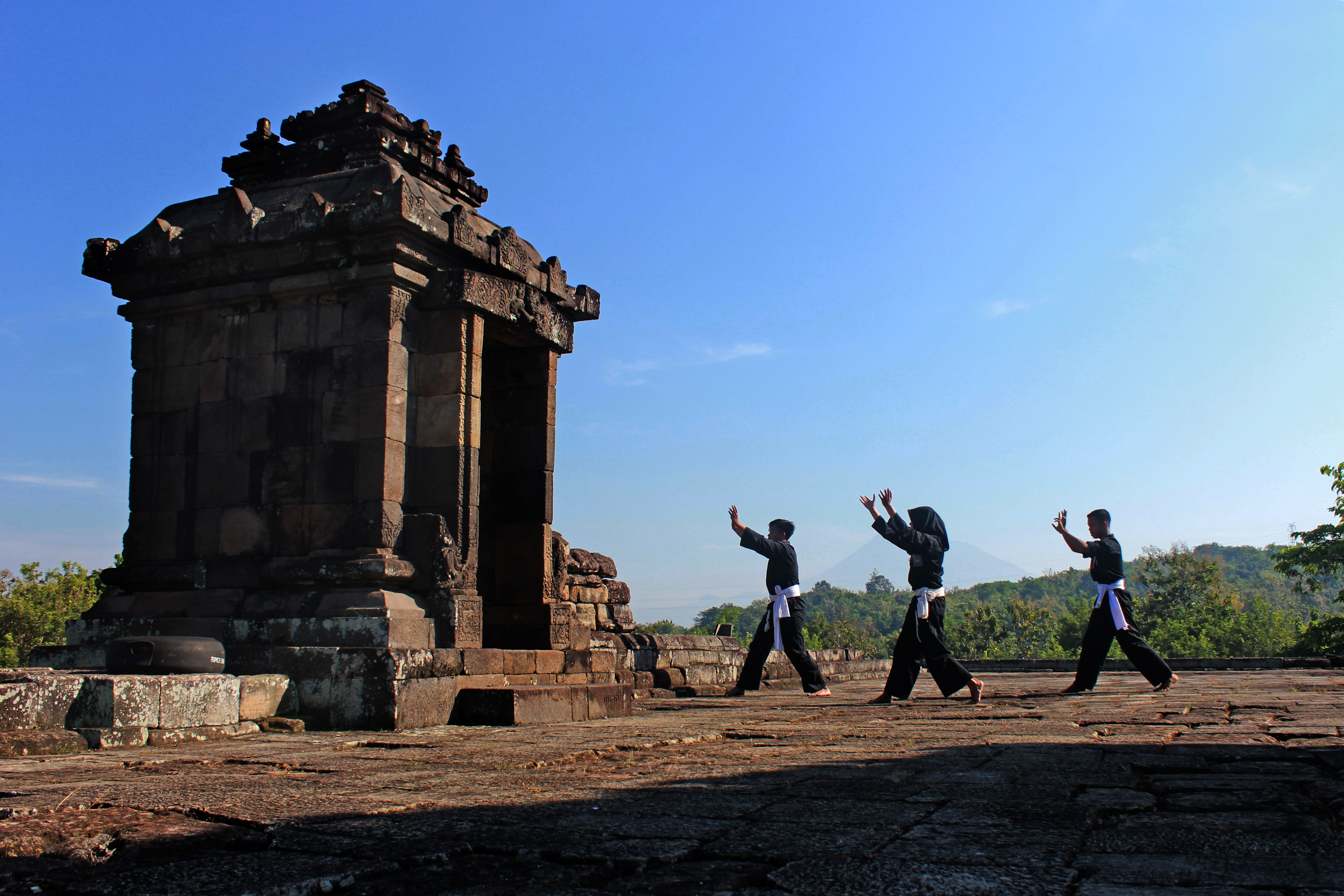
Opening

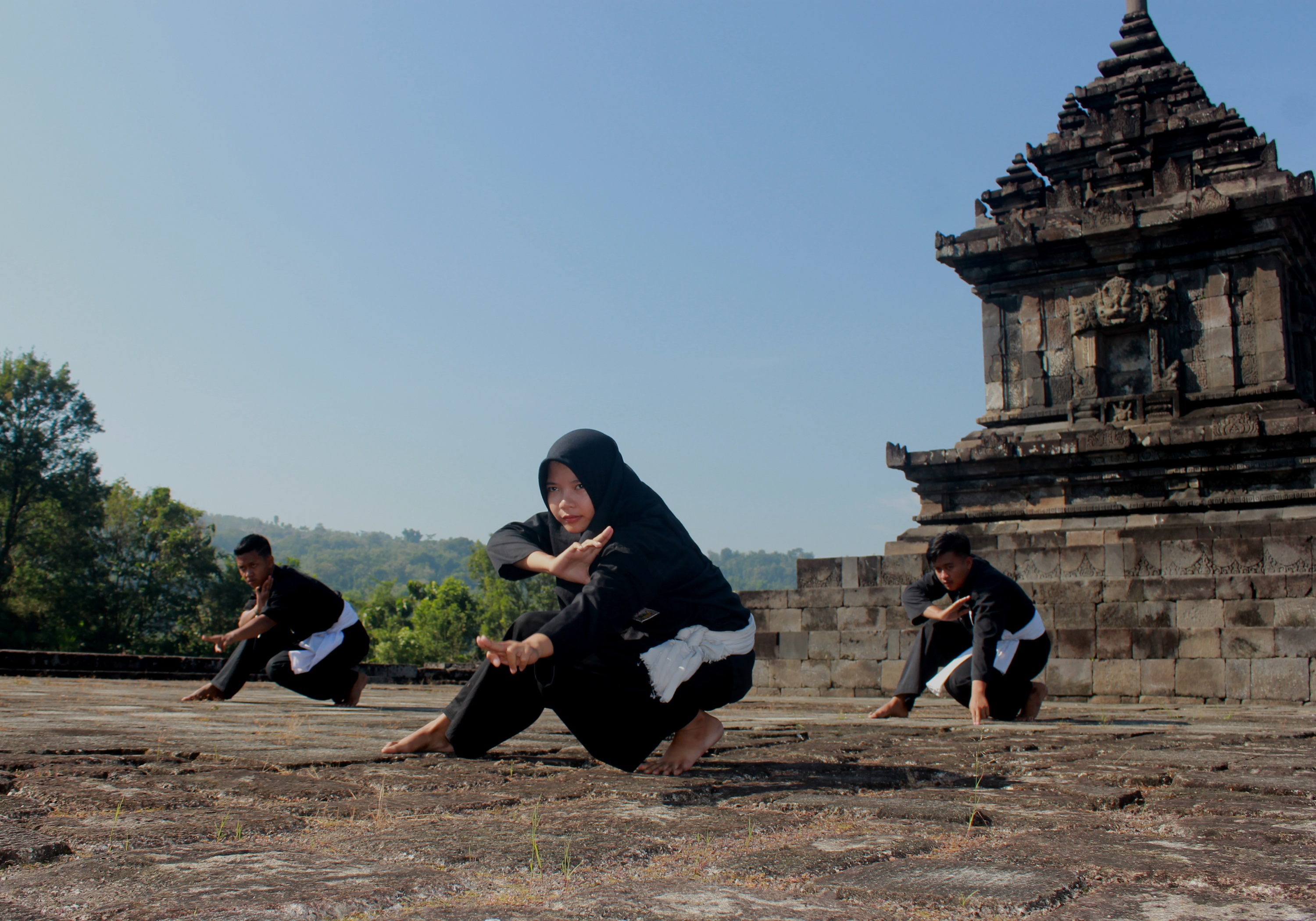
Squat when opening

== See also ==
- Pencak silat
- Indonesian martial arts
