= Tengah Plantation MRT station =

Future Mass Rapid Transit station in Singapore

Tengah Plantation JE1 登加种植 தெங்கா தோட்டம்
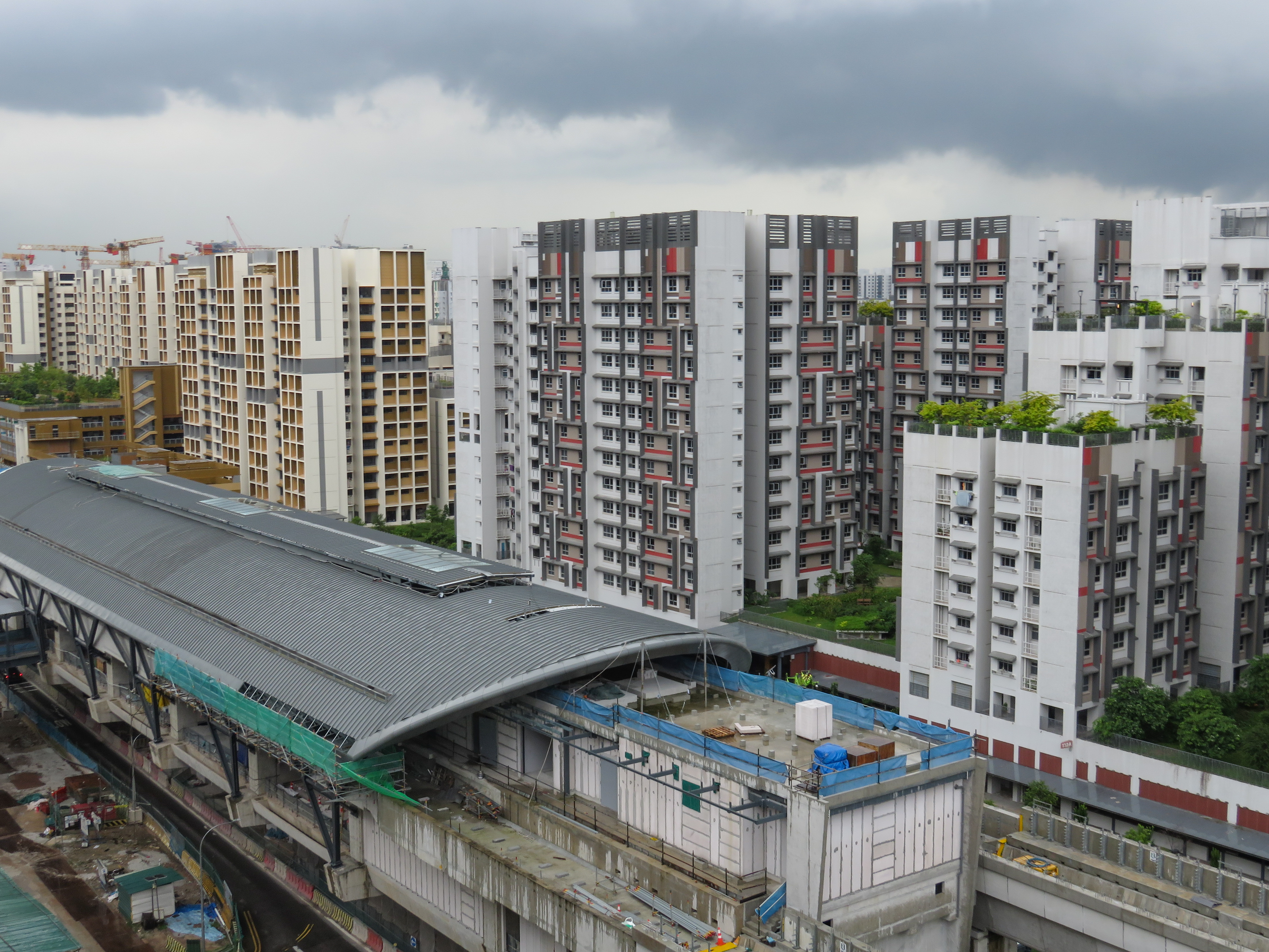
- Tengah Plantation MRT station under construction in December 2025

General information
- Location: 21 Plantation Crescent, Singapore 699929
- Coordinates: 01°21′26″N 103°44′00″E
- System: Future Mass Rapid Transit (MRT) station
- Owner: Land Transport Authority
- Operator: Singapore One Rail
- Line: Jurong Region Line
- Platforms: 2 (1 island platform)
- Tracks: 2
- Connections: Bus, Taxi

Construction
- Structure type: Elevated
- Platform levels: 1
- Parking: Yes
- Cycle facilities: Yes
- Accessible: Yes

Other information
- Station code: TGP

History
- Opening: 2028; 2 years' time

Services
Preceding station	Mass Rapid Transit	Following station
Tengah Terminus	Jurong Region Line Future service	Tengah Park towards Pandan Reservoir
Track layout
Location
- Location within Singapore Rail

Tengah Plantation MRT station is a future elevated Mass Rapid Transit (MRT) station on the Jurong Region Line in Tengah, Singapore, set to open in 2028.

== History ==
On 9 May 2018, the Land Transport Authority (LTA) announced that Tengah Plantation station would be part of the proposed 24-kilometre (15 mi) Jurong Region Line (JRL). The station would be constructed as part of Phase 2 (JRL East), a branch line consisting of 7 stations branching from Tengah to Pandan Reservoir. Phase 2 was expected to be completed in 2027. However, the restrictions on construction due to the COVID-19 pandemic has led to delays, with the completion date pushed to 2028.

The contract for the design and construction of Tengah Plantation station was awarded to a joint venture between John Holland Pty Ltd and McConnell Dowell South East Asia Pte Ltd for S$265.4 million (US$198.1 million) in March 2020. The contract included the design and construction of the Tengah Park and Bukit Batok West stations and associated viaducts.

== Location ==
The station will be located within the future Tengah planning area in the Plantation District along Plantation Crescent. The station is located next to Plantation Plaza and Tengah Community Hub.
