= Bukit Batok West MRT station =

Future Mass Rapid Transit station in Singapore

Bukit Batok West JE3 武吉巴督西 புக்கிட் பாத்தோக் வெஸ்ட்
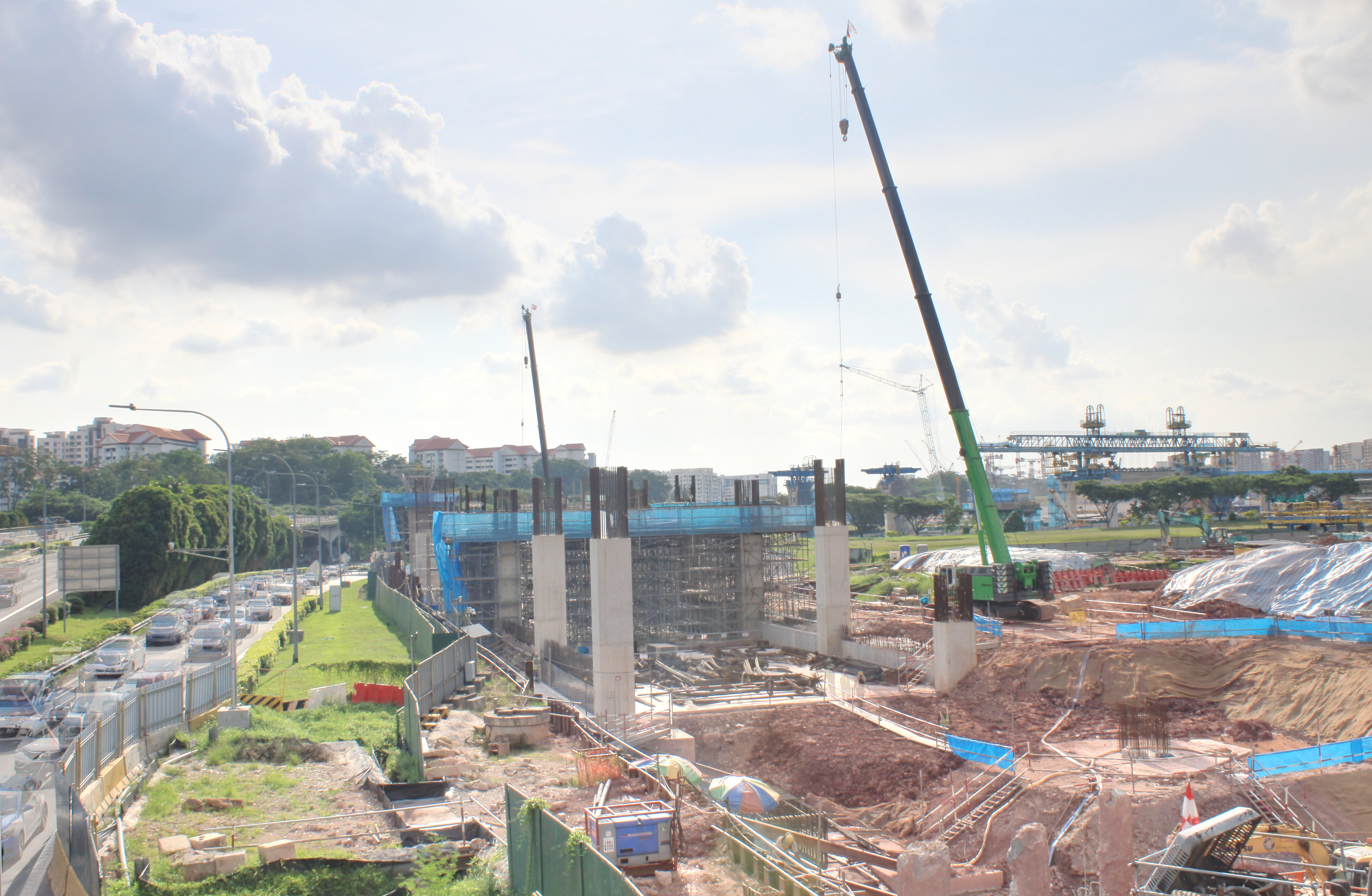
- Bukit Batok West MRT station site in May 2024

General information
- Location: 399 Bukit Batok West Avenue 8, Singapore 659779
- Coordinates: 01°20′44″N 103°44′23″E
- System: Future Mass Rapid Transit (MRT) station
- Owner: Land Transport Authority
- Operator: Singapore One Rail
- Line: Jurong Region Line
- Platforms: 2 (1 island platform)
- Tracks: 2
- Connections: Bus, Taxi

Construction
- Structure type: Elevated
- Platform levels: 1
- Parking: Yes
- Cycle facilities: Yes
- Accessible: Yes

Other information
- Station code: BBW

History
- Opening: 2028; 2 years' time

Services
Preceding station	Mass Rapid Transit	Following station
Tengah Park towards Tengah	Jurong Region Line Future service	Toh Guan towards Pandan Reservoir
Track layout
Location
- Location within Singapore Rail

Bukit Batok West MRT station is a future elevated Mass Rapid Transit (MRT) station on the Jurong Region Line located along the boundary of Bukit Batok and Jurong East planning areas, Singapore.

== History ==
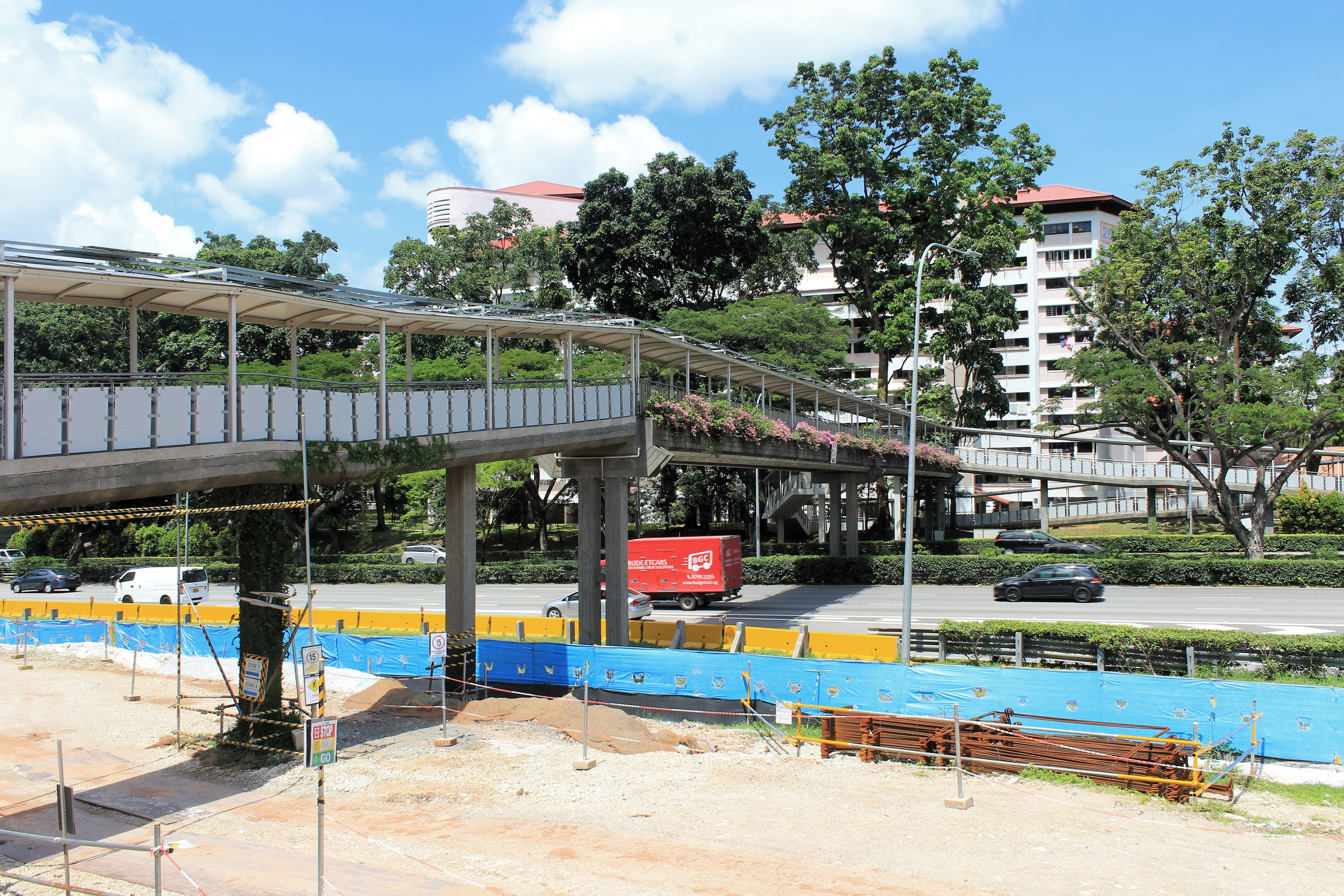
Bukit Batok West MRT station site future linkway location

On 9 May 2018, LTA announced that Bukit Batok West station would be part of the proposed Jurong Region Line (JRL). The station will be constructed as part of Phase 2, JRL (East), consisting of 7 stations between Tengah and Pandan Reservoir, and is expected to be completed in 2028.

Contract J108 for the design and construction of Bukit Batok West Station and associated viaducts was awarded to John Holland Pty Ltd – McConnell Dowell South East Asia Pte Ltd Joint Venture (JV) at a sum of S$265.4 million in March 2020. Construction will start in 2020, with completion in 2028. Contract J108 also includes the design and construction of Tengah Plantation Station and Tengah Park Station, and associated viaducts.

Initially expected to open in 2027, the restrictions on the construction due to the COVID-19 pandemic has led to delays in the JRL line completion, and the date was pushed to 2028.

== Location ==
The station complex will be situated next to the PIE slip road at the junction with Bukit Batok Road and Jurong Town Hall Road. It is located in the Bukit Batok planning area in Bukit Batok West Subzone, parallel to the PIE, surrounded by housing estate to the north and south.

Access to the station will be via 5 exits located on either side of the PIE.
