= Indira (1929 film) =

- Directed by: Jyotish Bannerjee
- Story by: Bankim Chandra Chatterjee
- Based on: Indira by Bankim Chandra Chatterjee
- Starring: Durgadas Bannerjee; Tulsi Banerjee; B. S. Rajhans
- Cinematography: Manglu
- Distributed by: Madan Theatres
- Release date: 14 December 1929
- Country: India
- Language: Silent (Bengali intertitles)

Indira is an Indian silent drama film directed by Jyotish Bannerjee based on Bankim Chandra Chatterjee's 1873 Bengali novel of the same name. The film was released on 14 December 1929 under the banner of Madan Theatres. This is the first cinamtic adaptation of the novel.

== Plot ==
Indira, a young girl who is married at an early age. Her father is a wealthy zamindar. While going to her in-laws house she is attacked and robbed by dacoits. Indira becomes separated from the others and spends the night in the jungle. The following day, Indira encounters a Brahmin, who takes pity on her and gives her shelter. Meanwhile, her parents and her in-laws believe that she has disappeared and are unable to discover where she is. Indira later meets a sympathetic woman named Shubha. Shubha's husband, Raman Babu, learns about Indira's marriage and helps her to reunite with Indira's husband Upendra.

== Cast ==
- Durgadas Bannerjee as Upendra
- B. S. Rajhans
- Tarak Bagchi
- Tulsi Banerjee
- Tarakbala
- Leelavathi
- Jainarayan Mukherjee
- Satyen Dey
- Miss Light
