= Tengah Park MRT station =

Future Mass Rapid Transit station in Singapore

Tengah Park JE2 登加公园 தெங்கா பூங்கா
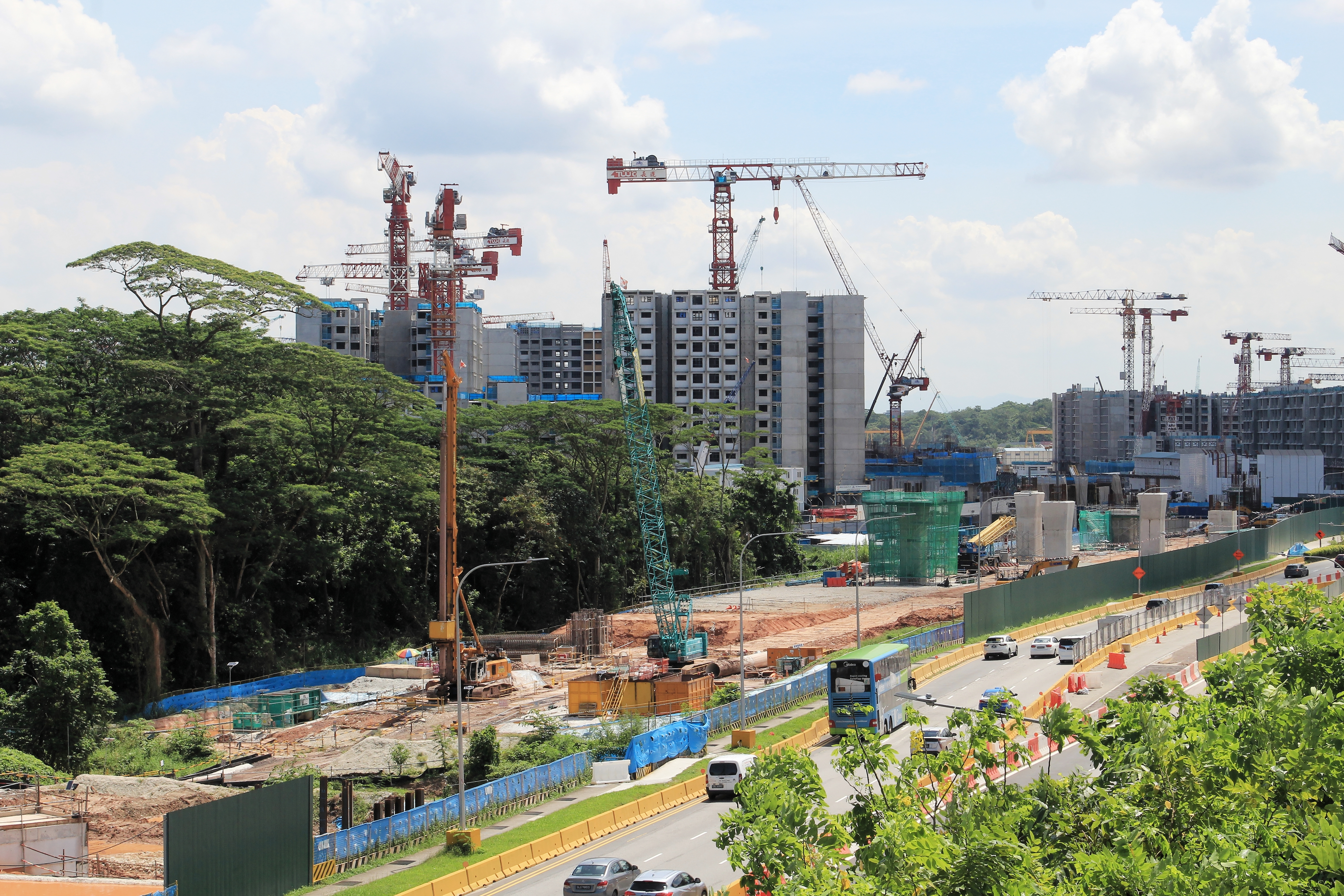
- Tengah Park MRT station site

General information
- Location: 15 Bukit Batok Road, Singapore 659961
- Coordinates: 01°21′08″N 103°44′12″E
- System: Future Mass Rapid Transit (MRT) station
- Owner: Land Transport Authority
- Operator: Singapore One Rail
- Line: Jurong Region Line
- Platforms: 2 (1 island platform)
- Tracks: 2
- Connections: Bus, Taxi

Construction
- Structure type: Elevated
- Platform levels: 1
- Parking: Yes
- Cycle facilities: Yes
- Accessible: Yes

Other information
- Station code: TGK

History
- Opening: 2028; 2 years' time

Services
Preceding station	Mass Rapid Transit	Following station
Tengah Plantation towards Tengah	Jurong Region Line Future service	Bukit Batok West towards Pandan Reservoir
Track layout
Location
- Location within Singapore Rail

Tengah Park MRT station is a future elevated Mass Rapid Transit (MRT) station on the Jurong Region Line located along the boundary of Tengah and Bukit Batok planning areas, Singapore.

== History ==
On 9 May 2018, the Land Transport Authority (LTA) announced that Tengah Park station would be part of the proposed 24-kilometre (15 mi) Jurong Region Line (JRL). The station would be constructed as part of Phase 2 (JRL East), a branch line consisting of 7 stations branching from Tengah to Pandan Reservoir. Phase 2 was expected to be completed in 2027. However, the restrictions on construction due to the COVID-19 pandemic has led to delays, with the completion date pushed to 2028.

The contract for the design and construction of Tengah Plantation station was awarded to a joint venture between John Holland Pty Ltd and McConnell Dowell South East Asia Pte Ltd for S$265.4 million (US$198.1 million) in March 2020. The contract included the design and construction of the Tengah Plantation station and Bukit Batok West station and associated viaducts.

== Location ==
The station complex will be situated next to Bukit Batok Road, before the junction with Bukit Batok West Avenue 3. It is located at the boundary between the Tengah and Bukit Batok planning area in the Brickworks Subzone, opposite Dulwich College Singapore.

Access to the station will be via 5 exits total, on either side of Bukit Batok Road.
