= Imam Shah =

Malaysian actor

- إيمان شاه
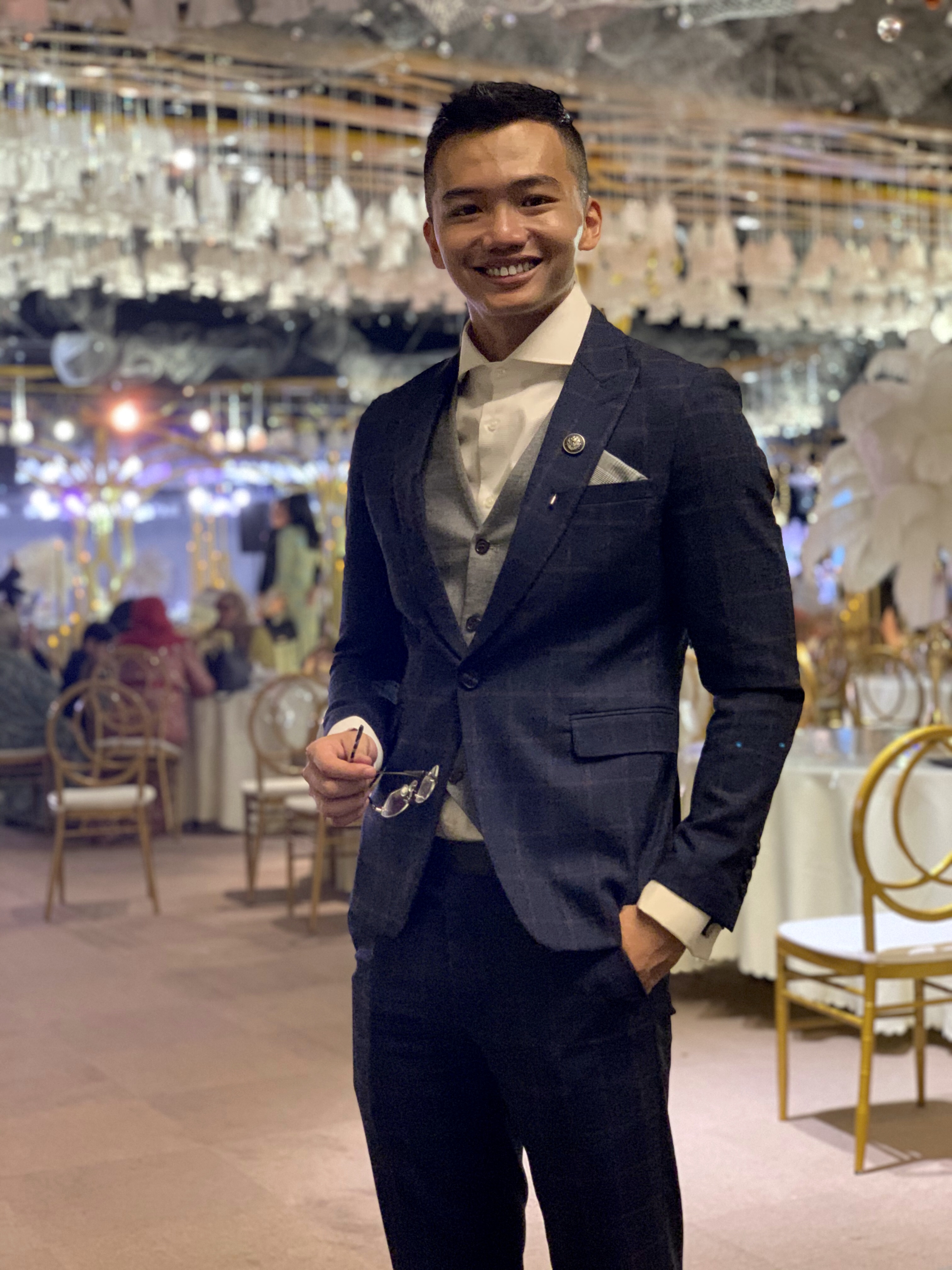
- Imam at Nadia Brian's wedding in 2019.
- Born: Muhammad Imam Shah Abdul Mutalib; June 21, 1988 (age 38); Singapore
- Other name: Emy
- Occupations: Actor; Entrepreneur
- Years active: 2013–current
- Spouse: Hannah Delisha (m. 2021)
- Family: Abdul Mutalib (Father); Mariana Yati (Mother); Nona Asiah (Grandmother)
- Awards: Mediacorp Suria Most Popular Male Personality 2015

Muhammad Imam Shah Abdul Mutalib (born 21 June 1988) is a Malaysian actor born in Singapore. He is known for his action roles on Singaporean television channel MediaCorp Suria. In Malaysia, he is known for his role as Shafiq in Lafazkan Kalimah Cintamu (2018).

== Early life ==
Imam was born on 21 June 1988 in Singapore and raised in Kuala Lumpur, Malaysia. He attended Sri Inai School in Kuala Lumpur from 1996 to 2001 before returning to Singapore to do his national service as a firefighter. Imam is the son of Singaporean actress Mariana Yati and grandson of Biduanita Nona Asiah.

== Career ==
Imam started acting in Singapore as a calefare in Mengejar Mentari S2 (2015), before gaining attention with his main role in the drama series S.O.S and Firasat (Premonition) (2014). He was later crowned the Most Popular Male Personality in Pesta Perdana (2015), beating Syarif Sleeq and Hisyam Hamid for the award.

Imam moved to Malaysia and began his acting career and was chosen to play the character Shafiq in one of Siti Rosmizah Semail's highly anticipated novels adaption titled Lafazkan Kalimah Cintamu in 2018.

On March 25, 2020, Imam starred alongside actress and longtime friend Hannah Delisha in the action drama SAGA 2.0

In 2025, Imam played the role of Amirul Rafiq, under the direction of Feroz Kader through a drama adaptation of the novel by Siti Rosmizah Semail titled Dia Imamku alongside Kamal Adli and Siti Saleha.

== Personal life ==
Imam obtained Malaysian permanent resident status and immigrated to Malaysia in 2017.

A year later, Imam and Hannah Delisha got engaged and later married in a private wedding ceremony at The Fullerton Hotel Singapore on 18 February 2021.

== Filmography ==
=== Drama ===
Year	Title	Role	TV Channel	Note
2013	Refleksi S1	Zahid	Mediacorp Suria	First drama
2013	Mengejar Mentari	James	Mediacorp Suria	
2013	SOS	Sufyan	Mediacorp Suria	
2014	Refleksi S2	Shahrul	Mediacorp Suria	
2014	Firasat 1	Shahid	Mediacorp Suria	
2014	The Chalet	Boi Ketat	DVD	
2015	SAGA	Zachary Borhan	Mediacorp Suria	
2015	31 Disember	Azam	Mediacorp Suria	
2016	JB Pailang	Chen Lang	Film	Not published
2017	Firasat 2	Shahid	Mediacorp Suria	
2017	Faculty	Daniel	Mediacorp Saluran 5	
2017	Pinggan Tak Retak, Nasi Tak Dingin	Zul Helmi	TV3	
2018	Lafazkan Kalimah Cintamu	Shafiq	Astro Ria	Siti Rosmizah Semail
2018	Oppa, I Love You	Reza	TV1	
2018	Rintihan Hati	Eddy/ Fazli	Mediacorp Suria	
2019	SAGA 2.0	Zachary Borhan	Mediacorp Suria	New York Film Festival
2021	Kisah Rumah Tangga	Iman	Astro Ria	
2024	Makan Inc.	Ashraf	Mediacorp Suria	
2025	Dia Imamku	Amirul Rafiq	Astro Ria	Works by Siti Rosmizah Semail
