= Iskandar Ismail =

- Born: Iskandar Mirza Ismail; 23 July 1956; Colony of Singapore
- Origin: Singapore
- Died: 1 November 2014 (aged 58) Singapore
- Genres: Pop, instrumental, world, orchestral
- Occupations: Composer, conductor, producer, performer, educator
- Instrument: Piano
- Years active: 1975–2014

Iskandar Mirza Ismail (23 July 1956 – 1 November 2014) was a prominent Singaporean musician who worked as a composer, arranger, conductor, music director, recording producer, performer and educator in his long career. In recognition of his extensive contributions to the music scene of Singapore, he was awarded the Cultural Medallion in 2008.

== Early years ==
Iskandar was the eldest of five children born to Singaporean musicians Ismail Kassim and Nona Asiah. His mother, a singer and protégé of Zubir Said, saw the musical talent in Iskandar and sent him to Zubir for weekly music lessons from the age of 8. Iskandar later studied the electone and eventually won first prize at the Singapore Electone Festival in 1975. At the age of 15, he became the youngest teacher at the Yamaha Music School in Singapore.

Encouraged by Zubir, Iskandar decided to study music at Berklee College of Music in 1976, where he won the John Lewis Jazz Masters Award for his excellence in jazz music in 1978. A year later, he graduated with a degree in Professional Music.

== Career ==
One of Iskandar's musical signatures was his prominent use of motivic development. Thematically, he often blended influences from Eastern and Western musical cultures, and composed music from numerous genres such as classical, pop, and folk music.

Despite the fact that he did not speak Chinese, Iskandar wrote and produced songs for Chinese artistes when Warner Taiwan engaged his music studio for over 15 years. This led him to work with numerous Hong Kong artists including Dave Wang，Sandy Lam, George Lam, Sally Yeh, Aaron Kwok, and Jacky Cheung. He was also the composer of the theme music for the long-running reality television series Star Search "飞高梦远" ("Fly high and dream far"), which was first used beginning on the fourth season in 1995 and has been used since then.

Iskandar collaborated with other Asian artistic talents like Dick Lee, Anita Sarawak, and Ekachai Uekrongtham. He was the arranger for prominent local stage musicals such as Kampung Amber (1994), Sing to the Dawn (1996), Snow. Wolf. Lake (1997), and Chang & Eng (1997).

== Achievements ==
=== Musical accomplishments ===
Since the 1980s, following his graduation from Berklee, Iskandar composed music for more than 10 opening and closing ceremonies of the Singapore Youth Festival. The year 1988 saw the first of his many musical directions of the National Day Parade. In addition to writing for the annual Chingay street parade held as part of the Lunar New Year celebrations, Iskandar also wrote music for the inaugural editions of the Asian Youth Games in 2009 and Youth Olympic Games in 2010, held in Singapore.

Iskandar's music took him beyond the shores of Singapore on numerous occasions, often as part of Singapore's cultural diplomacy platform Spotlight. He also took charge of the musical production and direction for the 2006 Asian Games in Doha.

On top of his professional accomplishments, Iskandar was an advocate of nurturing future generations of Singaporean artists. He participated in the annual ChildAid charity concert by Singapore Press Holdings to raise funds for the Budding Artists Fund. He served as the concert's long-time artistic director until his death, and was paid tribute to during the 2014 edition of ChildAid. After becoming the music director for the National University of Singapore Jazz Band in 2006, Iskandar strived to inspire young amateur jazz musicians and create performance opportunities to showcase their talent.

=== Awards ===
Year	Achievement
1975	Second prize winner at the Yamaha Electone Festival in Singapore.
1978	Winner of the John Lewis Jazz Masters Award at Berklee College of Music.
2003	Winner of Berita Harian Achiever of the Year Award.
2007	Awarded Honorary Fellowship, London College of Music, Thames Valley University, United Kingdom.
2008	Recipient of the Singapore Cultural Medallion for Music.

== Selected works ==
=== Musicals ===
Year	Title
1994	Singapore Festival of Arts musical Kampung Amber with Dick Lee.
1995	Big Bang!, composed by Kenneth Lyen. Mortal Sins, composed by Dick Lee. Star Search theme song 飞高梦远, composed by him and lyrics by Chen Jiaming.
1996	Sing to the Dawn, composed by Dick Lee. Hotpants, composed by Dick Lee.
1997	A Twist of Fate, composed by Dick Lee. Snow. Wolf. Lake. Chang & Eng.
1999	Chang & Eng restaged at the Kallang Theatre.
2000	PCK The Musical. President's Star Charity Show.
2001	Chang & Eng restaged at Victoria Concert Hall.
2002	Composed songs for the opening of the Esplanade Theatre.
2006	ChildAid, Singapore Press Holdings charity concert for young talent.
2008	Beauty World, staged at the Esplanade Theatre.
2009	ChildAid, Singapore Press Holdings charity concert for young talent, performed at Resorts World Sentosa.
2012	ChildAid, Singapore Press Holdings charity concert for young talent, performed at Marina Bay Sands Grand Theatre.

=== International works ===
Year	Description
1997	Orchestral arrangements for musical Chang & Eng, staged in Beijing, China.
2002	Orchestral arrangements for musical Chang & Eng, staged in Bangkok, Thailand.
2004	Orchestral arrangements for musical Snow. Wolf. Lake, staged in Mandarin in Hong Kong and several cities of China.
2006	Commissioned Music Producer for the opening ceremony of the 15th Asian Games in Doha, Qatar, with Dick Lee. Composer of multicultural performance Generation/s, performed in Tokyo, Japan, as part of Spotlight Singapore.
2008	Composer for multicultural performance Generation/s, performed in Moscow, Russia, as part of Spotlight Singapore.
2011	Composer for multicultural performance Selamat, performed in Cape Town, South Africa, as part of Spotlight Singapore.
2012	Composer for multicultural performance Living Dreams, performed in Bratislava, Slovakia, as part of Spotlight Singapore.
2015	Co-composer with Julian Wong for Pasar Singapura, performed in Mexico City, Mexico, as part of Spotlight Singapore (presented posthumously).

== Death ==
Iskandar died on 1 November 2014 after an extended battle with brain and lung cancer, leaving behind his wife Ernawaty Sorianto (married 1985) and two children, Emil Daruwin (born 1986) and Valerie (born 1987).
