= Asiah Aman =

Singaporean singer and actress (1931–2024)

- عائشة أمان
- Asiah in 2016
- Born: Asiah binti Aman; 29 November 1931 (Note: Some sources state her birthdate to be unknown due to missing birth records but she has stated her own birthdate to be 29 November 1931 in an interview.); Singapore, Straits Settlements
- Died: 30 July 2024 (aged 92); Changi General Hospital, Singapore
- Other name: Nona Asiah
- Occupations: Singer; actress
- Years active: 1940s–1975
- Spouse: Ismail Kassim (m. 1955; died 1994)
- Children: 5; including Iskandar
- Relatives: Imam Shah (grandson)
- Awards: Cultural Medallion, 2016; Singapore Women's Hall of Fame, 2022

Asiah binti Aman (29 November 1931 – 30 July 2024), known professionally as Nona Asiah, was a Singaporean singer and actress. Born in Singapore under British rule, she was the oldest of six children to a local Malay mother and Indonesian father of Malay descent from Pontianak, West Kalimantan. Her career began in the 1940s when she worked as a singer during the Japanese occupation, singing Japanese songs for soldiers in camps in Seletar and Tengah. Following the end of the occupation, she began working for Radio Malaya and sang Malay-language songs with the radio's band.

Her singing skills were recognised by British recording company His Master's Voice, which led to her signing a contract with them and producing a Malay cover of "Bésame Mucho" that became popular. She also developed her stage name Nona Asiah with her mentor Zubir Said around this time. Asiah's first film role was in 1948 when she sang on Malay film Chinta alongside P. Ramlee, both of them making their debut in this film. She went on to perform throughout the 1950s and 1960s before retiring in 1975, subsequently teaching singing and acting from the 1970s to 1980s.

She was awarded the Cultural Medallion in 2016 and inducted into the Singapore Women's Hall of Fame in 2022 for her contributions to music. Her son, Iskandar Ismail, was also a Cultural Medallion recipient who predeceased her in 2014. Asiah died in 2024 following heart complications at the Changi General Hospital; she was buried in a cemetery in Lim Chu Kang.

== Early life and career ==
Asiah was born on 29 November 1931 in Singapore, then a part of the Straits Settlements, to Hajar Rahmah, a bangsawan singer, and Aman Ahmad, a musician. The oldest of six siblings, she lived in a shophouse unit at Allenby Road. Asiah recalled that "performers and football players from the nearby Jalan Besar Stadium would gather at our place." Her mother Hajar was a Malay Singaporean who worked as a prima donna for the Dean Tijah opera troupe. Her father Aman came from Pontianak, Indonesia, and worked as a painter and musician; he painted the backdrops and sets for their troupe. Asiah's parents arrived in Singapore after being contracted to work at New World Amusement Park. She studied at a Malay school in Kampong Glam and a secondary school in Rochor. In her youth, Asiah joined school choirs due to an interest in singing.

Asiah learnt English at night private schools. Despite only studying up to Standard 7, Asiah was a part of a wave of female performers who managed to attend primary and secondary school. During the Japanese occupation, Asiah developed a love interest with a Japanese teacher, Watanabe Makoto, who was impressed by their bangsawan performances. He subsequently invited Asiah and Hajar to attend Japanese classes so they could learn Japanese and perform bangsawan in Japanese. Asiah and Hajar learnt katakana at Cathay Building, with soldiers sending them to different camps in Seletar and Tengah to perform for Japanese troops. After these shows, they received payment in cigarettes and food before being sent back to Cathay Building. This was Asiah's first experience performing and singing.

== Singing and acting career ==
After the surrender of Japan, Asiah got her first paying job as a singer for a band called Tiga Serumpun (lit. 'Three Get-Together') at Radio Malaya in 1946. While working there, she taught Malay through songs when the station started broadcasting in schools. Asiah was soon offered a recording contract by British record label His Master's Voice (HMV), and recorded her first song, a Malay cover of "Bésame Mucho", in 1949 on the Pathé label, (Note: The Pathé label on HMV was originally Pathé Records, which was founded in 1897, that was sold to Columbia Records in 1928 and became a part of EMI in 1931.) which became an instant success. Asiah recorded twenty more songs for HMV by the time she turned nineteen. Asiah, who recorded these songs with Tiga Serumpun, was often paid S$45.00 a song with additional royalties. This was considered a large sum at the time, and an executive of HMV had "taught [them] how to open bank accounts" as "he was worried [they] would spend all [their] money." This was also when she developed her stage name, Nona Asiah, which was suggested by her mentor Zubir Said. Zubir, whose songs Asiah also covered multiple songs of, was a friend of Asiah's mother, which was how she knew of him. Asiah met Zubir as he was the music director for the HMV's Singapore studio, and learnt the piano, music theory, and vocal techniques from him.

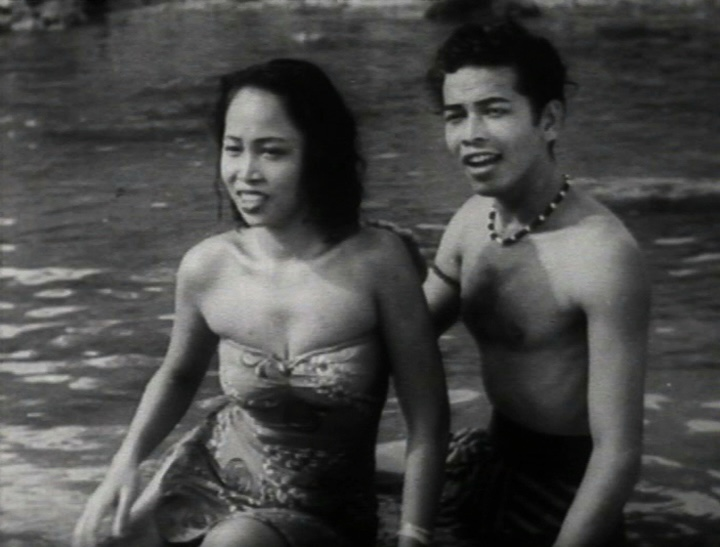
Asiah and P. Ramlee sang the parts for Siput Sarawak (left) and S. Roomai Noor (right) in Chinta (1948), respectively.

Following this popularity, she recorded more songs such as "Sumbangsihku" (lit. 'My Loving Gift') and "Chiumku Lagi" (lit. 'Kiss Me Again'), and became the vocalist of the Malay Women's Orchestra. Following World War II, bangsawan performances were on the decline, and bangsawan performers such as Asiah moved into the film industry. She also worked as a freelance singer after the war. She made her film debut in 1948 as a singer alongside P. Ramlee, a fellow singer in his debut, in Malay-language film Chinta (lit. 'Love'), with Asiah and Ramlee singing the parts for actors Siput Sarawak and S. Roomai Noor, respectively. She got the role in the film from Zubir, who was the music director for Chinta. Asiah continued working as a voice-over singer for Malay films after Chinta, of which some recordings were popular enough to have concert performances held. Asiah worked as a playback singer for Malay Film Productions and later Cathay-Keris Films.

In 1949, Asiah joined a female Malay band, Wanita Kronchong Orkest, and performed at their debut performance at New World Amusement Park. She also performed with the band Kenchanawati. In the 1950s, Asiah travelled and performed overseas in Brunei and Sarawak with the Malay Women's Orchestra, making $400 to $500 a month. During this time, she still worked at Radio Malaya, hosting a radio show and recording for EMI. As Asiah had knowledge on European music, she was asked to teach the solfège system through singing on Radio Malaya programmes. She later recorded sixteen singing exercises with Columbia Records in the 1950s, which were titled Sistem solmisasi; a textbook authored by Zubir provided explanations for the records. She stated that during this time, she was very busy and almost gave birth to her second child in the HMV studio.

In 1951, Asiah had a main role in Malayan Film Unit's Pelangi (lit. 'Rainbow'), alongside Ismail Kassim. The film also featured songs by Zubir that were sung by Asiah, Ismail, and Sani Naneng. Her first acting role, Asiah was persuaded to attempt acting by Pelangi's director Nas Achnas, who suggested her to try after hearing her singing talents. After Pelangi, Asiah ultimately decided that she was not interested in acting and decided to continue singing for radio broadcasts and workshops. In 1962, she was a part of a "cultural mission" to territories in Borneo – specifically Kuching, Brunei, and North Borneo – where she performed alongside other artistes. In 1975, Asiah retired after she gave her final live performance at Radio Televisyen Malaysia in Kuala Lumpur, where she performed multiple Malay songs. After her retirement, she continued performing singing and acting throughout the 1980s and 1990s, and conducted singing workshops for children.

=== Style ===
Asiah's singing was described as "[mediating] between East and West and traditional and modern". She tended to adjust to the studio's microphone and sang with a lower pitched croon. For "Lihatlah" (lit. 'Look'; for the film Bahagia di Singapura), Asiah sang short phrases followed by the trumpet and saxophone, while also harmonising with the plucked bass and piano.

== Personal life and death ==
In 1955, Asiah married Ismail Kassim, a Malay singer whom she had previously met whilst working at Radio Malaya. Ismail died on 17 September 1994 in a motorcycle accident. She had five children with him, spending most of her time taking care of them and teaching them music. Among her children included Cultural Medallion recipient Iskandar Ismail (1956–2014). Asiah was also known for her interest in fashion, having designed and sewn together a few custom kebayas and baju kurungs. She had created her own fashion business, where she sold a modernised version of the kebaya that other female celebrities wore.

In 2015, a tribute concert at the Esplanade – Theatres on the Bay, titled Si Cempaka Biru – Celebrating The Life of Nona Asiah, was held for her. It was organised by Najip Ali and included actors such as Imam Shah, who was her grandson. That same year, it was reported that she lived in a terrace house in Eunos. In 2016, she was awarded the Cultural Medallion alongside artist Koh Mun Hong. Asiah stated upon her conferment that "It should have happened 10 years ago" and that she was "too old to receive this now", but nonetheless "never expected [that she] would get the award." She was inducted into the Singapore Women's Hall of Fame in 2022.

On 30 July 2024, Asiah died at Changi General Hospital of heart complications at 94. She had been at the hospital for the previous two months suffering from heart, kidney, and lung problems. The following day, Asiah was brought to Ba'alwie Mosque and was buried at a Muslim cemetery in Lim Chu Kang. Imam stated that she had been suffering from dementia in her later life.
