= Momo Latiff =

Malaysian singer

- Born: Marfuah Makarim; 1923; Batavia, Dutch East Indies
- Died: 10 December 2015 (aged 91–92); North Region, Singapore
- Citizenship: Indonesia; Singapore
- Occupations: Singer; actress
- Years active: 1941–1979

Marfuah Makarim (1923 – 10 December 2015), better known by the stage name Momo Latiff, was an Indonesian-born Singaporean singer and actress who was active in the 1950s and 1960s. Her successful songs included "Pantai Chinta Berahi" ("PCB" beach, now Pantai Cahaya Bulan) to the music of pianist Dodo Mallinger. Originally a dancer, she was contracted as singer by Shaw Brothers for films such as Putus Harapan (1955) and Pendekar Bujang Lapok (1959).

== Early life ==
Latiff was born Marfuah Makarim in 1923 in Dutch East Indies. She moved to Straits Settlements in 1939, while in an Indonesian performing troupe on tour in the region.

== Career ==
Latiff was discovered by an executive at Shaw Brothers Studio which engaged her as a playback singer, leading her singing voice to be used in a movie. She was best known for her role as the wife of a martial arts master in Pendekar Bujang Lapok (1959), co-starring P. Ramlee, S. Shamsuddin, and Aziz Sattar.

== Death ==
On 9 December 2015, Latiff suffered from a high blood pressure and collapsed at her residence in Woodlands. She was rushed into Khoo Teck Puat Hospital where she slipped into a coma due to burst in her brain blood vessel, and died next day at the age of 92.
