= Nilam (film) =

1949 film by B. S. Rajhans

- Directed by: B. S. Rajhans
- Story by: A. R. Iyer
- Produced by: Run Run Shaw
- Starring: Siput Sarawak; S. Roomai Noor; Daeng Harris; P. Ramlee
- Music by: Osman Ahmad
- Production company: Malay Film Productions
- Distributed by: Shaw Brothers Studio
- Release date: 28 September 1949
- Running time: 108 minutes
- Country: Singapore
- Language: Malay

Nilam (English: Nilam) is a 1949 Singaporean Malay-language black-and-white romantic drama film directed by B. S. Rajhans and produced by Run Run Shaw. The story was written by A.R. Iyer. It starred Siput Sarawak, S. Roomai Noor, Daeng Harris, and P. Ramlee.

== Synopsis ==
The film tells the story of a young Javanese man, Ahmad, who leaves his village with a magic protective dagger given to him by his mother. He takes to the seas, eager to discover the world. He reaches the Arabian coast, and travels to Egypt, encountering belly dancers, harem women, etc. He meets Princess Nilam and falls in love. Nilam's father will allow Ahmad to marry her only if he brings back a blue diamond guarded by monsters at a faraway location.

== Cast ==
- Siput Sarawak as Princess Nilam/Dilara
- S. Roomai Noor as Ahmad
- Daeng Harris as Jaiman/Paiman
- P. Ramlee as Rashid
- Siti Tanjung Perak as Suratna
- Neng Yatimah as Dancer
- Jaafar Wiryo as King Kaherah

== Production ==
Nilam was produced by Run Run Shaw for Shaw Brothers Studio and was directed by B.S. Rajhans. The story was written by A.R. Iyer, and the musical numbers were composed by Osman Ahmad. It starred Siput Sarawak, S. Roomai Noor, Daeng Harris, and P. Ramlee.

Zainab made her second film appearance starring as The Child. Sarawak portrayed two roles, as Princess Nilam and dancer Dilara, which were shot using trick photography. The songs were sung by P. Ramlee. Some of the film was shot at outdoor locations in Singapore. Indoor scenes were shot at the studio.

== Release and reception ==
Nilam was released on September 28, 1949, and was advertised in Nanyang Siang Pau and The Straits Times. It received a positive review from the audience for a collaboration between Siput Sarawak and S. Roomai Noor. The film became one of eight popular films produced by Shaw Brothers Studio in the 1940s.

== Sources ==
- Pratista, Himawan; Nugroho, Agustinus Dwi. Kompilasi Buletin Film Montase: Volume 3 (in Indonesian). Montase Press. ISBN 978-602-61314-4-7.
