= Chinta (film) =

1948 film by B. S. Rajhans

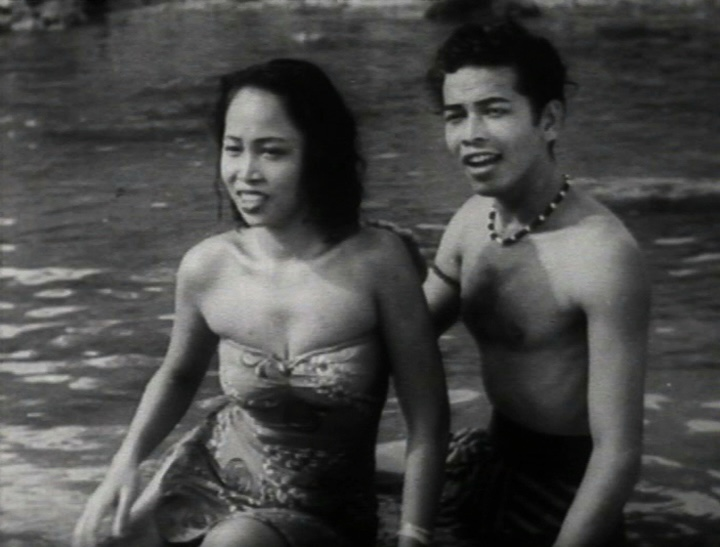
- Siput Sarawak (left) and S. Roomai Noor (right) in Chinta
- Directed by: B. S. Rajhans
- Starring: Siput Sarawak; S. Roomai Noor
- Music by: Zubir Said; Alfonso Soliano
- Production company: Malay Film Productions
- Distributed by: Shaw Brothers
- Release date: 31 October 1948
- Countries: Singapore; Malaya
- Language: Malay

Chinta (Malay: Love) is a 1948 Singaporean Malay-language black-and-white romantic drama film directed by B. S. Rajhans and produced by Malay Film Productions. It was released on 31 October 1948.

Chinta was the first Malayan film released after the declaration of the Malayan Emergency, and also marks the first screen appearance of P. Ramlee. Ramlee also performed as a playback singer in the film, providing vocals in five songs for the lead actor S. Roomai Noor. It is the oldest surviving film of Malayan cinema.

== Plot ==
A boat is caught in a huge tempest and sinks. Only King Kanchi (S. Roomai Noor) survives. A few fishermen find him on the shore and rescue him. The love story begins when Chinta (Siput Sarawak), a young village girl, takes care of him.

== Cast ==
- Siput Sarawak as Chinta
- S. Roomai Noor as King Kanchi and Sanchi
- Ja'afar Wiryo as Camban
- Harris as Vidush
- P. Ramlee as Putar
- Suhara Effendi as Ruchi
- Norsiah
- Lelawati
- Asiah Aman
