= Tengah, Singapore =

Planning area and new town in Singapore

Tengah
- Planning area and town

Other transcription(s)
  - Malay: Tengah (Rumi)
  - Chinese: 登加; Dēngjiā (Pinyin); Teng-ka (Hokkien POJ)
  - Tamil: தெங்கா Teṅkā (Transliteration)
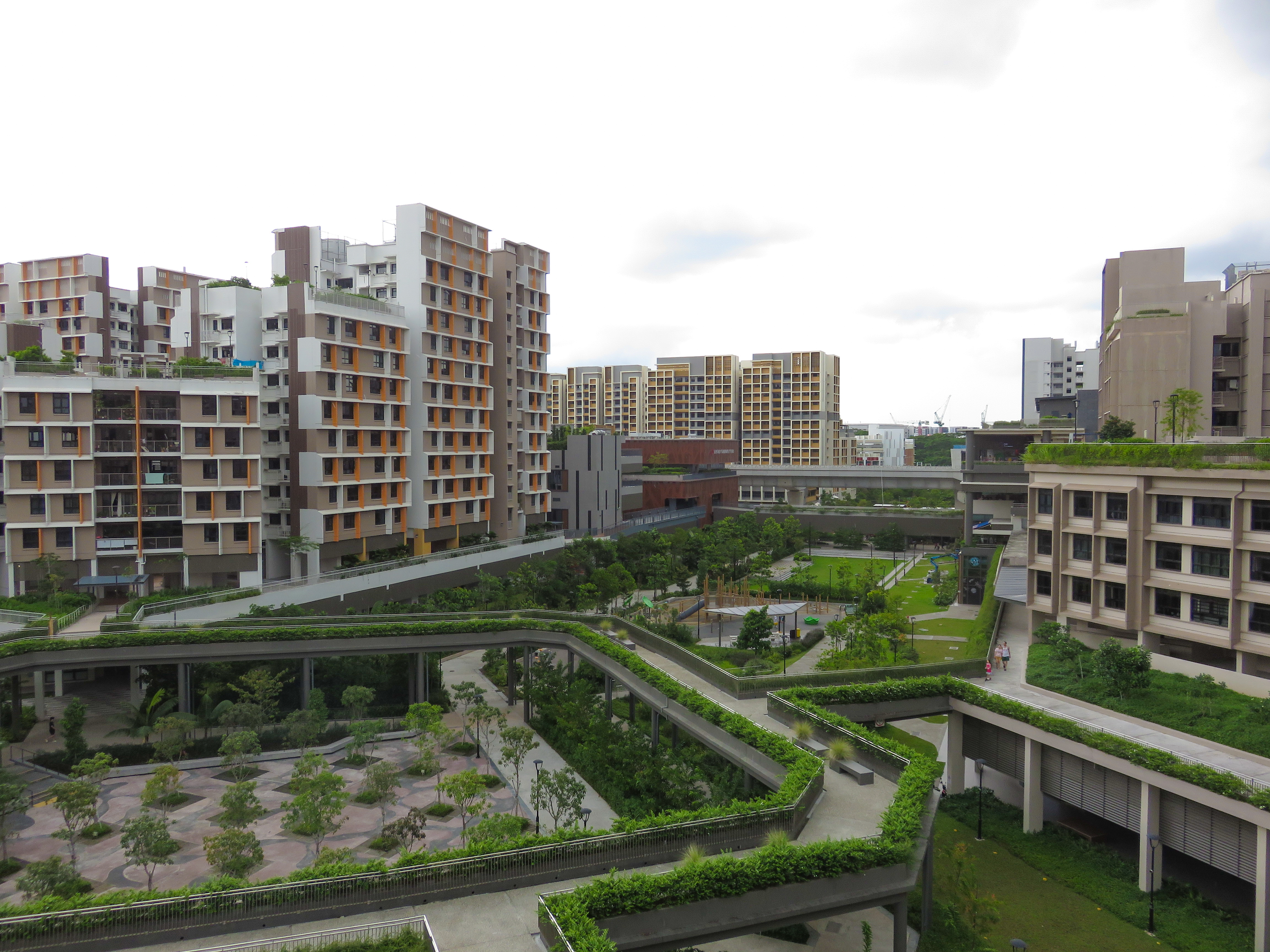
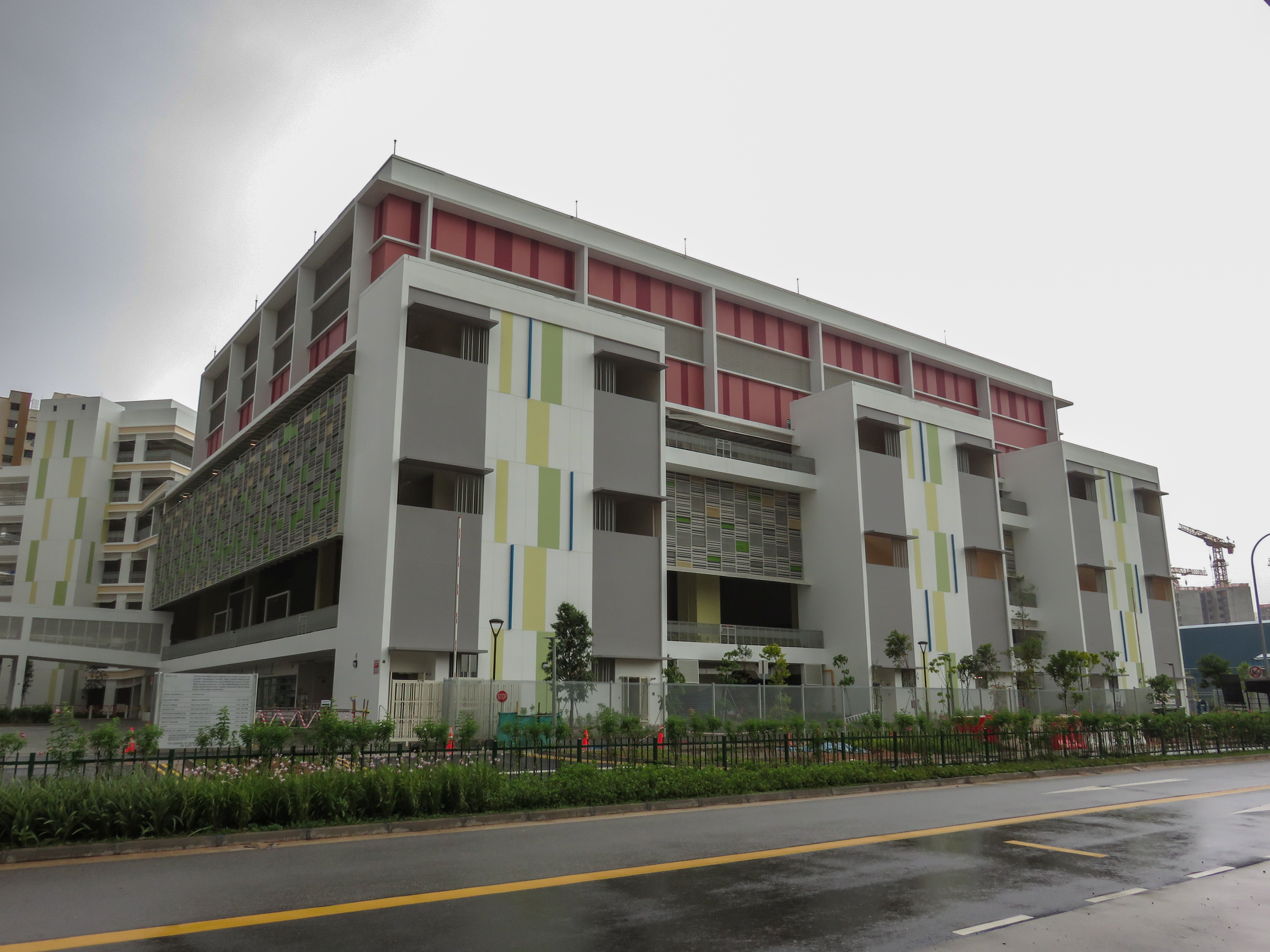
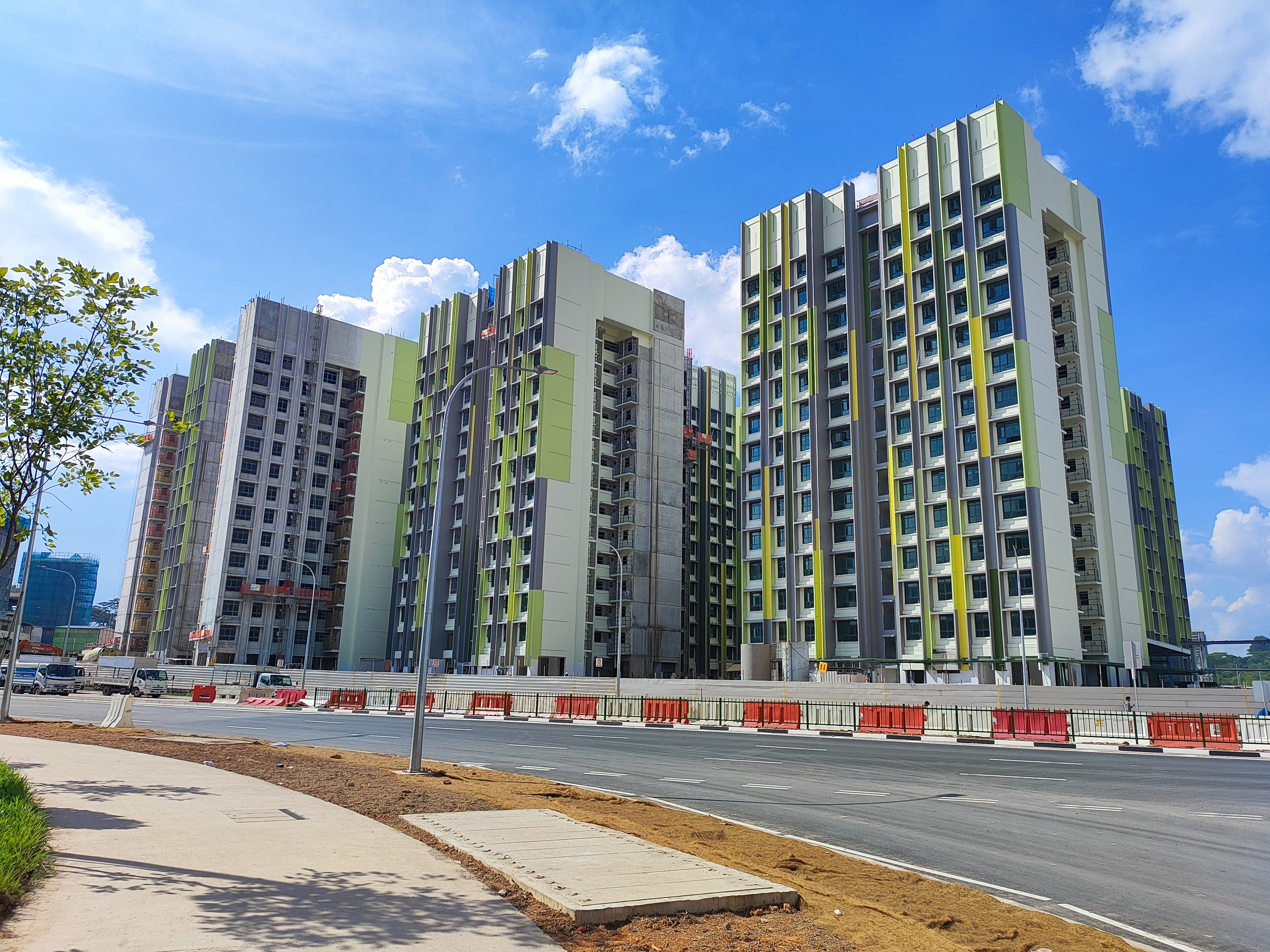
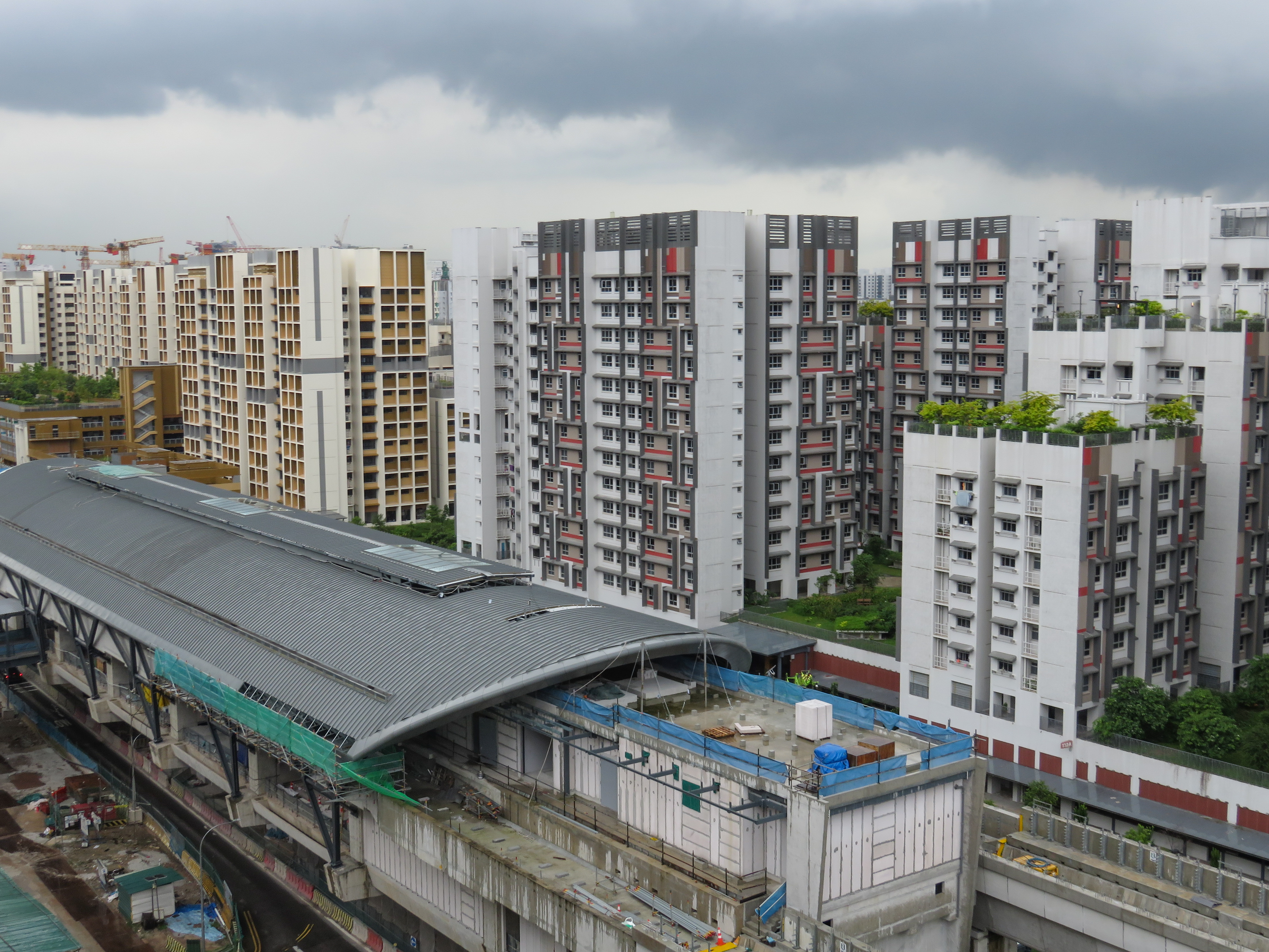
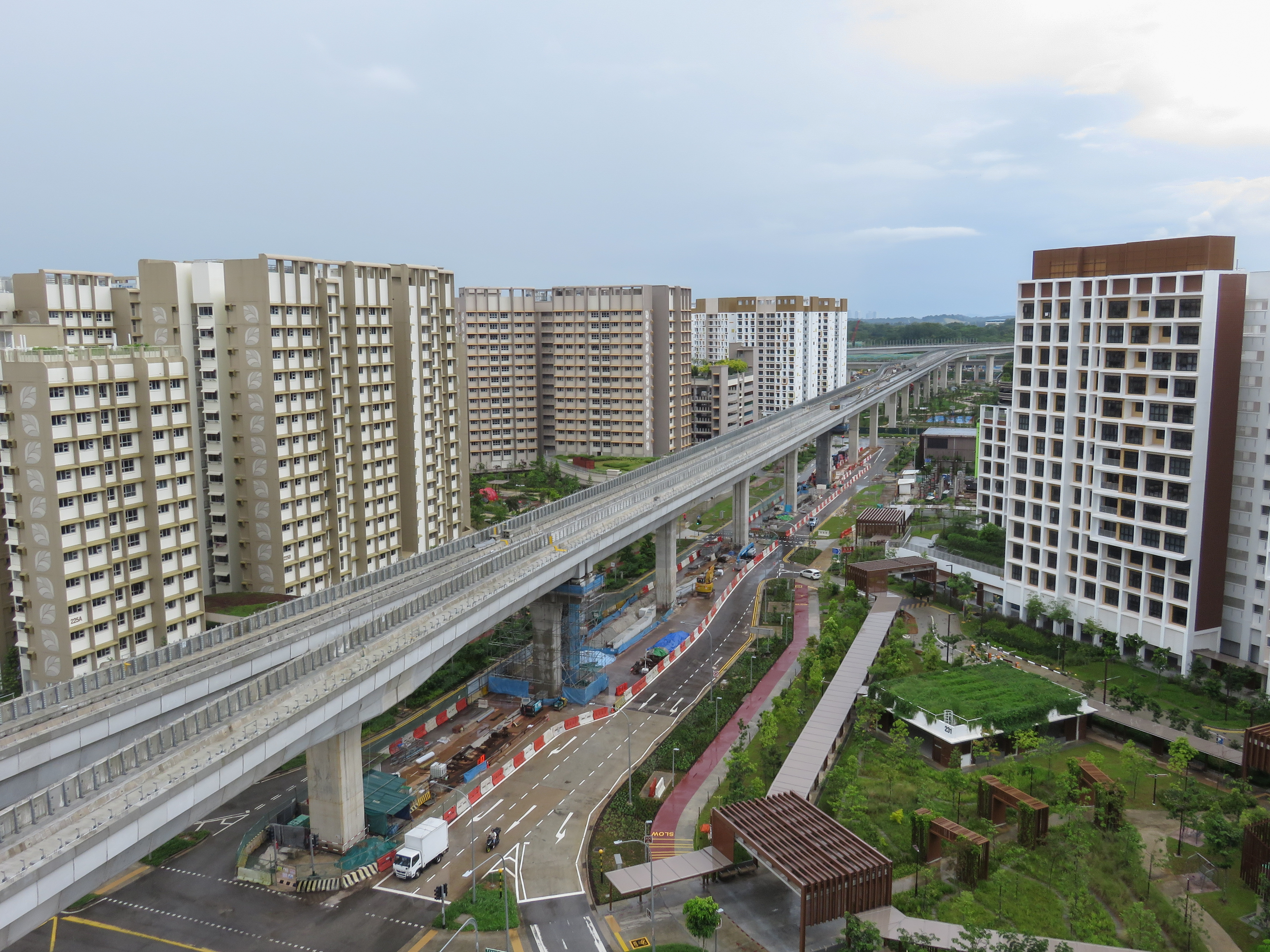
- From top, left to right: Tengah Community Club, Pioneer Primary School, Tengah Park District, Tengah Plantation MRT Station, Tengah Garden District, Hong Kah MRT Station and Tengah Depot, Tengah Boulevard, Plantation Plaza, Tengah Drive Linear Park.

- Location of Tengah in Singapore

- Location of Tengah within Singapore
- Region: West Region
- CDC: South West CDC
- Town councils: Chua Chu Kang Town Council
- Constituency: Chua Chu Kang GRC

Government
  - Mayor: South West CDC: Low Yen Ling
  - Members of Parliament: Chua Chu Kang GRC: Choo Pei Ling; Jeffrey Siow

Area
  - Total: 7.36 km^{2} (2.84 sq mi)

Population (2026)
  - Total: 34,340
  - Density: 4,670/km^{2} (12,100/sq mi)
- Postal district: 24
- Postal sector: 69

Tengah (IPA: /ˈtəŋɑː/ TUHNG-ah) is a planning area and new town in the West Region of Singapore. It is bordered by Choa Chu Kang to the north, Jurong East to the south, Bukit Batok to the east, and Jurong West to the west.

The development of Tengah is planned around five districts: Plantation District, Garden District, Park District, Brickland District and Forest Hill District. The town is planned to accommodate approximately 42,000 homes, including about 30,000 Housing and Development Board (HDB) flats.

Tengah is the first HDB town to have been planned with smart technologies implemented at the town-wide level from the outset. It is being developed alongside the Jurong Innovation District and Jurong Lake District as part of the broader transformation of western Singapore.

== Etymology ==
In the year 1853, during the British Straits Settlements period, the area was characterised by thick forests and quiet rivers. A Teochew man named Teng-Ah Tong arrived in the area. He was granted special permission by local nobility to clear the trees and establish large farms along the riverbanks. In those days, these river farms were known as chu kangs, (Note: Chinese: 厝港; pinyin: cuògǎng; Pe̍h-ūe-jī: tshù-káng; Peng'im: cu^{3}gang^{2}) and the leader of the settlement was called a kangchu, (Note: Chinese: 港主; pinyin: gǎngzhǔ; Pe̍h-ūe-jī: káng-tsú; Peng'im: gang^{2}zu^{2}) which means "master of the riverbank" in Teochew. As Teng-Ah Tong was the leader of the settlement, people began calling his plantation Teng Chu Kang or Teng Ah Kang.

A small part of the Kranji River ran right next to his land. People started calling this body of water the Teng-Ah River, which is now known as the Tengah River. Over many years, the name of the area shortened from Teng Ah to Tengah. The historical name was saved when the British Royal Air Force built Tengah Airfield over the old farmland in 1936. Today, the name is still used for the modern Housing and Development Board (HDB) residential town.

== History ==
=== Early history ===
Before its redevelopment as a new town, the area now occupied by Tengah was predominantly rural. Historical research indicates that the area formed part of a riverside farm with gambir and pepper plantations by 1853. During the early 20th century, cultivation progressively shifted towards rubber, and by 1945 much of the area was occupied by rubber plantations, with smaller areas of forest and scattered housing. By 1966, rubber cultivation had declined substantially, while grassland, other forms of rural land use and brickworks had become more prominent. By 1975, only limited rubber cultivation remained, alongside small areas of other cultivation.

The wider Jurong area also contained villages, agricultural land, plantations and other forms of small-scale rural activity. Settlements such as Hong Kah Village and Kampong Ulu Jurong formed part of the rural landscape of western Singapore before large-scale urban redevelopment began.

=== Resettlement and military use ===
During the 1980s and 1990s, villagers in Tengah were progressively relocated under government resettlement programmes, resulting in the demolition of many of the kampongs in the area.

Following the resettlement, much of the area was used for military training and remained comparatively undeveloped for several decades. By the 1980s and 1990s, Tengah had become a military training area, helping to preserve substantial tracts of open land even as surrounding parts of western Singapore underwent rapid urbanisation.

Military use continued into the 2010s. On 10 November 2015, the larger part of the former Hong Kah Village ceased to be used as an SAF military training area, with military training in the area subsequently shifted towards Ama Keng Road.

=== Planning and redevelopment ===
The release of the former military training land enabled the area to be planned for redevelopment as a new HDB town. On 8 September 2016, the Housing and Development Board formally unveiled the masterplan for Tengah, Singapore’s 24th HDB town. The plan envisaged a new “Forest Town” incorporating five housing districts, extensive green spaces, a car-free town centre and town-wide smart technologies.

The first phase of residential development began with the launch of Plantation Grove in November 2018, when HDB offered 1,620 flats in Tengah under its Build-To-Order programme. This marked the beginning of the development of Tengah as a new residential town following decades of rural and military use.

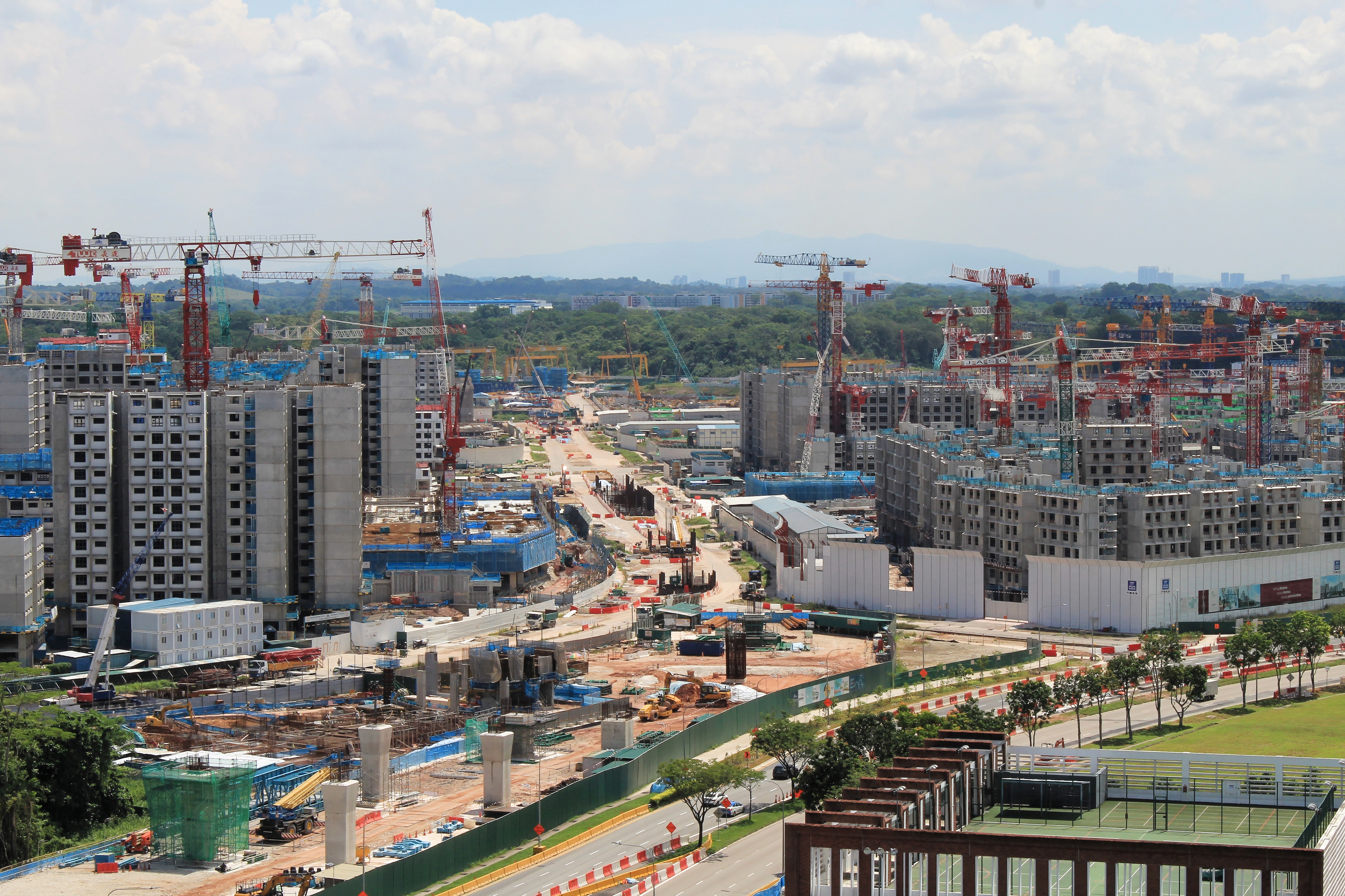
Tengah’s first apartment blocks under construction, June 2022

== Development as a new town ==
Tengah was announced as a new HDB town in the 2010s and became the first entirely new HDB town to be developed in Singapore in more than two decades.

The first Build-To-Order (BTO) flats in Tengah were launched by HDB in 2018. Subsequent BTO projects were launched progressively across the town's planned districts, with the first residents moving into the new town as the first housing developments were completed in August 2023.

HDB's planning framework envisages approximately 30,000 public-housing flats in Tengah, with additional housing and other developments contributing to the town's overall planned capacity of approximately 42,000 homes.

As the town develops, infrastructure and community facilities have been introduced progressively, including neighbourhood centres, schools, healthcare facilities, parks, green connectors and public-transport facilities.

Construction of Tengah Boulevard and surrounding infrastructure, 2023

== Town planning and districts ==
Tengah is divided into five districts, each planned with a distinct character and connected through a network of green spaces, pedestrian routes and cycling paths. Tengah is divided into five housing districts and is planned with dedicated pedestrian and cycling paths throughout the town.

=== Plantation District ===
The Plantation District is the first district of Tengah to undergo substantial development. When fully completed, it is planned to contain about 10,000 homes.

The district includes Plantation Farmway, a 1.3-kilometre green connector linking residential developments with the town centre and other community facilities. The area also incorporates landscaped open spaces, playgrounds, fitness areas and community gardens.

Plantation Plaza serves as a neighbourhood commercial centre, with about 75 shops distributed across five levels. Its facilities include a supermarket and food court.

=== Garden District ===
The Garden District is planned as another major residential district within Tengah and is planned to contain about 7,000 homes when fully developed.

Garden Farmway forms part of the district's network of green connectors. At approximately 1.5 kilometres in length, it provides a landscaped route through the residential neighbourhood and links residents to nearby amenities and community facilities.

Garden Farmway, viewed from Tengah Garden Avenue

Garden Waterfront I and Garden Waterfront II form part of the district's housing developments. Garden Waterfront II was completed under HDB's Construction Transformation Project, which incorporated advanced construction technologies and achieved a reported 25 per cent improvement in productivity compared with conventional construction methods.

=== Park District ===
The Park District is planned to contain about 13,000 homes and is intended to form one of the principal residential areas of Tengah.

The district is planned around extensive landscaped spaces and connections to Tengah's wider park and greenway network. Its development forms part of HDB's broader objective of integrating greenery and recreational spaces into the town's residential environment.

=== Brickland District ===
The Brickland District occupies the northern portion of Tengah. It is planned as a further residential district and is intended to provide additional housing as the town expands.

The district forms part of the longer-term development of Tengah and is connected to the rest of the town through the planned road, public-transport, pedestrian and cycling networks.

=== Forest Hill District ===
The Forest Hill District forms part of the longer-term development of Tengah. Its planning is intended to complement the town's broader green and ecological framework while providing additional residential and community facilities.

== Greenery and environmental planning ==
Greenery is a major component of Tengah's town-planning strategy. HDB has incorporated green connectors, landscaped spaces, community gardens and other forms of vegetation into the town's layout, with the intention of integrating greenery into the residential environment rather than confining it to isolated parks.

Environmental studies were conducted for Tengah North and Tengah South in 2021 to assess the environmental implications of the town's development. A subsequent Environmental Impact Assessment was conducted between December 2025 and March 2026 for the site earmarked for the future town centre. Environmental studies were conducted for Tengah North and Tengah South in 2021 to assess the environmental implications of the town's development. A subsequent Environmental Impact Assessment was conducted from December 2025 to March 2026 for Tengah Site 1, which is earmarked for the future Town Centre.

Tengah North, largely undeveloped, 2026

The environmental studies identified areas of ecological importance and examined ecological connectivity within Tengah. HDB has stated that the Recommended Area of Conservation identified in the Tengah North study is important for maintaining ecological connectivity within the town and that it would seek to retain the area where possible as development proceeds.

== Water bodies and water infrastructure ==
Water features form part of Tengah’s blue-green infrastructure, comprising retention ponds, streams and drainage channels integrated with its parks and green corridors.

=== Tengah Pond ===
Tengah Pond is a planned retention pond between the Garden and Plantation districts. It forms part of the waterfront landscape adjoining the Promenade Park and Forest Fringe, while contributing to the town’s wider drainage and ecological network.

Tengah Pond

=== Water bodies around Brickland ===
The Brickland area contains a network of ponds, streams and drains forming part of the northern Tengah drainage system. The Tengah North environmental study identified several existing water bodies, including Pond 1 and Pond 2, together with streams and drainage channels within the study area.

The ponds and streams also have ecological significance. HDB’s environmental-management measures provide for the retention of existing water bodies and sufficient hydrological flow, while Pond 1 and Pond 2 are incorporated into the planned creation of an open-country pond and ABC Waters features.

=== Tengah Service Reservoir ===
The Tengah Service Reservoir is a potable-water facility at the highest point of Tengah. Completed in November 2025, it comprises two tanks and supports current and future water demand from residential developments in Tengah and businesses in the adjoining Jurong Innovation District.

== Smart and sustainable development ==
Tengah was planned from the outset as a smart and sustainable HDB town. HDB describes it as the first HDB town planned with smart technologies implemented town-wide from the beginning.

The town's planning incorporates digital infrastructure and smart technologies intended to support estate management, environmental monitoring and the efficient operation of town services. These initiatives form part of HDB's wider approach to developing more sustainable and liveable towns.

Tengah has also been selected for the deployment of a centralised cooling system. In April 2026, HDB announced a contract for centralised cooling systems covering nine BTO projects in Tengah, providing access to the system for approximately 14,000 households across 12 projects.

== Community facilities and education ==
Community facilities have been introduced progressively as the town's population has grown. These include neighbourhood centres, food-and-beverage outlets, supermarkets, recreational facilities, schools and healthcare services.

Parc Point is a second-generation neighbourhood centre serving residents in Tengah. It contains nearly 40 shops and includes a polyclinic, food court and supermarket.

Parc Point

Educational institutions are being developed progressively alongside the residential districts. Their provision forms part of the town's broader planning framework, under which schools and other social infrastructure are integrated with housing and neighbourhood facilities.

== Healthcare ==
The Tengah Polyclinic was officially opened on 28 February 2026. It is operated by the National University Polyclinics and provides primary healthcare services to residents of Tengah and surrounding areas.

A future Tengah General and Community Hospital is planned along Tengah Garden Avenue. The facility forms part of Singapore's longer-term expansion of healthcare capacity in the western region.

== Transport ==
=== Public transport ===
Tengah is served by an expanding public transport network comprising bus and rail services. Bus services provide connections to the surrounding MRT network and the city centre, while the Jurong Region Line will provide direct rail connections within Tengah and to major transport nodes in western Singapore.

==== Bus ====
Tengah is served by Tengah Bus Interchange and an extensive network of bus services linking the town with the North–South, East–West and Downtown lines, as well as the city centre.

Tengah Bus Interchange

==== Rail ====
The Jurong Region Line (JRL) will form the backbone of Tengah’s future public transport network, providing extensive rail coverage across the town. Five stations are planned within Tengah: Tengah station (JS3), Hong Kah station (JS4), the planned JS2A station, Tengah Plantation station (JE1) and Tengah Park station (JE2). Together, they will provide rail access across much of Tengah, serving its residential precincts and major developments.

Tengah station will form the central link between the two routes of the JRL, providing a continuous rail connection through the town. The alignment will extend across Tengah’s western, central and eastern areas, giving residents throughout the town access to the wider MRT network.

Complementing the town’s bus network, the JRL will provide a principal rail connection for travel within Tengah and to surrounding areas. Its network of stations will support access to residential precincts, town-centre facilities and other major developments as Tengah continues to develop.

The four main stations serving Tengah are expected to open in 2028. JS2A, an infill station between JS2 and JS3, is planned for the mid-2030s to meet future commuter demand as the surrounding developments mature.

=== Cycling and walking ===
Tengah's planning incorporates a network of pedestrian paths, cycling paths and green connectors linking residential developments with parks, community facilities and transport nodes.

LTA cycling track and pedestrian walkway along Tengah Park Avenue

Green connectors such as Plantation Farmway and Garden Farmway form part of the town's wider active-mobility network. These routes are intended to provide alternatives to motorised transport for shorter journeys and to improve connectivity between neighbourhoods.

The town centre is planned as a pedestrian-oriented environment, with vehicular roads located below ground level in order to create a more continuous pedestrian environment at ground level.

=== Roads ===
The road network in Tengah is being constructed progressively alongside residential development. Major roads such as Tengah Boulevard and Tengah Garden Avenue form part of the town's internal road network and connect its developing districts with surrounding areas.

Road infrastructure has been developed in conjunction with new housing and transport facilities, including the Tengah Bus Interchange and the Jurong Region Line, with new roads and connections introduced to serve the town's expanding residential areas.

== Retail and commercial development ==
Commercial facilities in Tengah are being developed progressively to serve its growing population.

Plantation Plaza and Parc Point provide neighbourhood-level retail and service amenities, including supermarkets, food-and-beverage outlets and other shops.

A larger Tengah Town Centre is planned as the principal commercial and civic centre of the town. HDB has planned the town centre as a pedestrian-oriented environment, with roads located underground to create a more extensive car-free environment at ground level.

Tengah Town Centre before development, 2026

The town centre is also the subject of environmental assessment as part of the ongoing development of Tengah. An Environmental Impact Assessment for the site was conducted between December 2025 and March 2026.

== Relationship with surrounding developments ==
Tengah forms part of a wider cluster of developments in western Singapore.

To its west and north-west is the Jurong Innovation District (JID), a major mixed-use employment and innovation district developed by the JTC Corporation. The district is intended to bring together advanced manufacturing, research and development, education and supporting commercial activities.

To the east is the established town of Bukit Batok, while Jurong West lies predominantly to the north and west. Jurong East and the Jurong Lake District lie further south-east.

Tengah in the background, with Jurong East in the foreground

The proximity of Tengah to the Jurong Innovation District and Jurong Lake District is intended to provide residents with access to employment, education, commercial and recreational opportunities within the western region.

== Noise concerns and mitigation ==
Noise is an environmental consideration in the development of Tengah, owing principally to its proximity to Tengah Air Base, the Pan Island Expressway (PIE) and Kranji Expressway (KJE), and the elevated Jurong Region Line (JRL). These considerations have been incorporated into the planning and design of the new town and its surrounding infrastructure.

=== Tengah Air Base ===
The expansion of Tengah Air Base has been an important consideration in the planning of residential development in Tengah. A noise study conducted by the National Environment Agency was used to guide the planning of new housing around the expanded air base.

The planned relocation of operations from Paya Lebar Air Base is expected to increase flight activity at Tengah Air Base. In 2024, the Republic of Singapore Air Force estimated that flight frequency could increase by approximately 15–20 per cent. Residential developments near the air base incorporate measures such as thicker window glazing, façade overhangs or canopies, and building orientations designed to reduce exposure to direct flight paths.

=== Expressway traffic ===
The PIE and KJE run along the southern and northern approaches to Tengah respectively, exposing parts of the new town to road-traffic noise. Environmental assessment undertaken for developments in the area has therefore considered noise-sensitive receptors and the potential effects of road traffic.

Noise mitigation has also been considered in the development of the Tengah Vehicular Interchange. Its environmental impact assessment identified noise-sensitive receptors in the surrounding area and recommended measures including noise barriers during construction.

=== Jurong Region Line ===
The elevated JRL introduces a further potential source of transport noise within Tengah. Its design incorporates permanent noise barriers along viaducts near residential areas, while its trains will be equipped with noise-dampening wheels.

Noise barrier on the Jurong Region Line viaduct near Hong Kah station

Within Tengah, the line serves the new residential districts through Tengah Plantation, Tengah Park and Tengah stations. Noise considerations have consequently formed part of the planning of the JRL and its relationship with surrounding residential developments.

=== Cumulative noise ===
The coexistence of an operational air base, major expressways and an elevated railway makes cumulative noise a consideration in the planning of Tengah. Environmental assessments and transport planning studies therefore consider the combined effects of aircraft, road and rail noise, with measures such as building design, separation distances and noise barriers used where appropriate.

== Future development ==
Development of Tengah is expected to continue for several years as the remaining districts, housing projects, community facilities and transport infrastructure are progressively completed.

HDB has stated that close to half of the 30,000 public-housing flats planned for Tengah had been completed or were in place by 2026, with further developments continuing across the town.

The future development programme includes additional residential projects, neighbourhood amenities, the Tengah Town Centre, further healthcare and educational facilities, and the completion of the JRL.

An MOE school under construction in Tengah

As development progresses, HDB's environmental planning will continue to address ecological connectivity and the relationship between new developments and existing green areas.
