= B. S. Rajhans =

B.S. Rajhans
- Born: Balbir Singh Rajhans; 1903; Calcutta, British India
- Died: 31 May 1955 (aged 51–52); Colony of Singapore
- Occupation: Film director
- Years active: 1933-1955
- Spouse: Mohinder Kaur (died 2000)

Balbir Singh Rajhans was an Indian film director and actor known for directing 1940s and 1950s Malay films in the Colony of Singapore. He started his career as an actor and director in Indian cinema.

== Filmography ==
Note: Films as director in Malay, unless specified otherwise.

- Antara Senyum Dan Tangis
- Berdosa
- Buluh Perindu (1953)
- Yatim Piatu (1952)
- Anjuran Nasib (1952)
- Sejoli (1951)
- Bapa Saya (1951)
- Rachun Dunia (1950)
- Dewi Murni (1950)
- Aloha (1950)
- Nilam (1949)
- Nasib (1949)
- Pisau Berachun (1948)
- Chinta (1948)
- Singapura Di Waktu Malam (1947)
- Chempaka (1947)
- Seruan Merdeka (1946)
- Mard-e-Punjab (Punjabi)
- Chhoti Si Duniya lit. 'Small World' (1939) (director, Hindi), starring P. Jairaj and Leela Chitnis
- The Modern Girl (1935) (director, Hindi), drama film
- Laila Majnun (director, 1933) (Hindi), romantic drama film based on the Laila Majnu legend
- Gupta Ratna or Hidden Treasure (director, 1931) (silent)
- Krishnabarna Teerandaz lit. 'Krishnabarna the Archer' (director and actor, 1930) (silent)
- Kanthahaar or Diamond Necklace (actor, 1930) (silent), crime film
- Dalia (actor, 1930) (silent) as Rehmat Ali
- Indira (actor, 1929) (silent)
- Pahadi Pindhari or The Midnight Rider (actor, 1926) (silent), action film, also starring Jillo and Baburao
