= Pendekar =

Indonesian word martial art

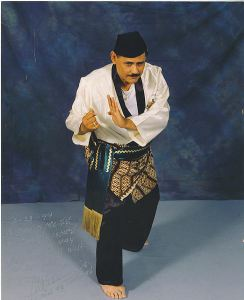
Pendekar Paul De Thouars

Pendekar (hero; master of swordsmanship or martial arts), Pandikar or Pandeka is a Malay word to reference or address a warrior who mastered martial arts, particularly silat. Not all masters carry the title; it must be either officially bestowed by royalty (similar to a knighthood) or unofficially by commonfolk. The latter is more common today, especially outside Southeast Asia. Today, the title is often adopted by the founder of a new style. Parallels can be drawn to the chess term grandmaster since the title of Pandeka is the highest possible rank of a practitioner of the Malaysian martial art silat.

== Etymology ==
Some theorize that it is a compound of the Malay words pandai, meaning clever or skilled, and akar meaning root. It may be related to the Kawi terms upakara which means teacher, and kekarepan which means ethos or ambition. A variant of pendekar is the word pakar which can mean any kind of expert.

== Attributes of a pendekar ==
A pendekar must master every aspect of silat. These include the forms and techniques, their combat application, internal methods and traditional medicine. A pendekar must be more than an instructor or expert, they must be a fighter, a traditional doctor, and a participant in the culture and wisdom of silat. The emphasis given to each of these varies from one style to another. Some systems are more sport-oriented while others focus on spiritual development. Traditional masters only consider a style to be "true silat" if it can be used in battle.

Meditation and internal training serves as a counterbalance for a warrior's martial skills. In northern Malaysia and southern Thailand, this balance is symbolised by the concept of jantan betina (male-female), equivalent to the Chinese yin and yang. In Indo-Malay folklore, esoteric knowledge is only gained by fasting and then meditating under a tree. Silat practitioners of the past would meditate and fast at length, often in caves, jungles and even graveyards so they would not fear death. With this mentality, a pendekar is always prepared for combat, whether they are unarmed or outnumbered. This is encapsulated in the Malay saying "From the tips of the hair to the tips of the toes" (Dari hujung rambut ke hujung kaki) meaning that all are potential weapons to be used at the right moment.

Purportedly, a pendekar of the highest skill needs no weapon aside from their mind to subdue the opponent. By focusing their energy, masters were said to be able to attack an opponent without physically touching them, strike a vital point from afar, or stop someone's heart without them noticing they've been hurt. Silat folklore is replete with tales of fighters possessing such skills as the ability to run very rapidly, vanish in a puff of smoke and reappear, change form, dash across the surface of water, turn invisible, or leap to the roof of a house.

Finally, a pendekar must be familiar with traditional healing methods. Massage is commonly taught alongside silat because of its relation to sentuhan or the art of striking pressure points. Sentuhan could also be applied to other aspects of healing such as stopping a wound from bleeding or stimulating energy flow. Some masters may have knowledge of herbalism or bone-setting. It was once considered necessary for anyone teaching silat to be able to nurse injured students back to health.

== See also ==
- Guru
- Hulubalang
- Warrior
