= Jalan Ampas =

Street in Balestier, Singapore

- Interactive map of Jalan Ampas
- Native name: Jalan Ampas جالن امڤاس (Malay); ஜலன் அம்பாஸ் (Tamil)
- Coordinates: 1.3263°N 103.851°E

Jalan Ampas is a street near Balestier Road in Singapore where the movie studios Malay Film Productions and its affiliate Shaw Brothers were located.

== Etymology and history ==
The name Jalan Ampas owes its heritage as a sugar cane plantation in the early days. In Malay, ampas tebu (post-1972 spelling: hampas tebu) refers to the fibrous pulp that remains after sugar cane has been crushed to extract its juice.

== Landmarks ==
=== Former Shaw Movie Studio ===
In 1947, under the banner of Malay Film Productions, the Shaw Brothers set up a film studio in the area, which was to become 'the golden age of Malay cinema'. During the 1950s and 60s, at the peak of its existence, the studio produced over 160 films at the span of two decades. Prominent figures such as John Wayne, Ava Gardner and former Malaysia Prime Minister Tunku Abdul Rahman visited the studio. During this time, the road itself is synonymous and associated with the studio till today.

The studio launched the careers of many Malay film stars, such as S. Shamsuddin, Aziz Sattar, Ahmad Nisfu and P. Ramlee. Films such as Seniman Bujang Lapok and Ibu Mertua-ku became instant hits and cult classics. However, in 1967 due to the lack of demand of Malay films, the studio ceased productions and closed down.
