= Musang =

Musang or musang sentheni may refer to:

- 7.62×37mm Musang, a Filipino rifle cartridge
- Anicca, the concept of impermanence in Buddhism
- Gua Musang, a town and territory in Kelantan, Malaysia
- musang, the Asian palm civet in the Tagalog, Malaysian and Indonesian languages
- Musang Berjanggut, Malaysian film
