= Rahimah Rahim =

Rahimah Rahim may refer to:

- Rahimah Rahim (singer, born 1955), singer from Singapore
- Rahimah Rahim (singer, born 1992), Singaporean student and singer from Leicester
