= Ismail Johari =

Malaysian novelist and police officer

- Born: March 13, 1947; Tanjung Karang, Selangor, Malayan Union (now Malaysia)
- Died: July 16, 2017 (aged 70); Bukit Jelutong, Shah Alam
- Resting place: Section 21 Muslim Cemetery, Shah Alam
- Occupations: Novelist, policeman
- Spouse: Rozita Mohd Nazir
- Writing career
- Language: Malay
- Genre: History
- Notable work: Bukit Kepong (novel)

Ismail Johari (13 March 1947 - 16 July 2017) was the author of the Bukit Kepong novel published by Dewan Bahasa dan Pustaka (DBP) in 1990 and one of the main script writers of the Bukit Kepong film produced by Jins Shamsuddin in 1981, both of which were based on an actual armed incident that took place on 23 February 1950 between the Federation of Malaya Police and gunmen of the Malayan Communist Party during the Malayan Emergency. The Bukit Kepong novel was adopted as the Form 4 secondary school and Sijil Pelajaran Malaysia (SPM) educational teaching material.

== Personal life ==
Ismail, the second child out of five siblings was born and raised in Tanjung Karang, Selangor. His parents held various laborious jobs to provide Ismail and his siblings good education and a comfortable living.

Ismail was a dedicated and committed police officer, holding various ranks during his 19-year service with the Royal Malaysia Police before pursuing a career as a private investigator and a fraud examiner.

He died on 16 July 2017 at the age of 70.
