= KRU Studios =

Malaysian media company

- Type: Private Limited Company
- Founded: Kuala Lumpur, Malaysia (1992)
- Headquarters: Bukit Jalil, Kuala Lumpur, Malaysia
- Key people: Dato' Norman Abdul Halim, Chief Executive Officer; Yusry Abdul Halim, Chief Creative Officer; Edry Abdul Halim, Creative Director; Datin Dr Shireen M Hashim, Group COO & Group CFO; Zarina Abdul Rahman, VP – Operations
- Website: www.krustudios.com

KRU Studios is a Malaysian media and entertainment company. Founded in 1992, KRU Studios has since diversified and now provides a range of services related to the media and entertainment industry, specialising in both production and distribution capabilities.

With offices and representatives in Malaysia, Indonesia, Singapore and the United States, KRU Studios' new 15-acre (61,000 m^{2}) production and post production facilities, which also includes backlots, was opened in July 2010.

== Products and services ==
=== Films ===
KRU Studios has produced a number of Malay language feature films such as Cicak-Man, Duyung, Cicakman 2 – Planet Hitam, Jin Notti, My Spy, Magika, and Karak. In June 2008, the company funded and co-produced an English language Hollywood film, Deadline featuring Brittany Murphy for global distribution.

In March 2011, KRU Studios released its action adventure feature film Hikayat Merong Mahawangsa. The film, internationally known as The Malay Chronicles: Bloodlines, was licensed to more than 70 countries, making it the most widely sold Malaysian film globally.

In 2014, the company embarked on a project of restoring the 1981 film Bukit Kepong, a dramatization of the Bukit Kepong incident directed by and starring Jins Shamsuddin.

In 2018, the company themselves had made a Malaysian Cars mockbuster movie called Wheely: Fast & Hilarious.
