= Bukit Kepong (film) =

1981 Malaysian war film

- Directed by: Jins Shamsuddin
- Written by: Aimi Jarr; ASP Yusoff Ariffin; ASP Ismail Johari
- Screenplay by: Jins Shamsuddin
- Story by: ASP Ismail Johari
- Produced by: Jins Shamsuddin
- Starring: Jins Shamsuddin; A. Rahim; Hussein Abu Hassan
- Cinematography: S. Mohan
- Edited by: Johari Ibrahim
- Production company: Jins Shamsudin Productions
- Release date: 29 April 1981 (Malaysia)
- Running time: 110 minutes
- Country: Malaysia
- Languages: Malay; English; Mandarin
- Budget: MYR 1.3 million
- Box office: MYR 1.7 million

Bukit Kepong is a 1981 Malaysian epic war film produced and directed by Jins Shamsuddin starring himself, A. Rahim and Hussein Abu Hassan. A collaboration between Jins Shamsuddin and the Royal Malaysia Police, the film is a dramatization of the Bukit Kepong incident in 1950.

The film has won eight awards in the third Malaysia Film Festival in 1982, including Best Film.

In 2014, the film was re-edited by United Studios (a distributing and marketing company of KRU International), which had invested MYR 100,000 in restoring and improvement for high definition (HD) display resolution of the original film. It was reproduced in HD version; as Bukit Kepong Versi Digital HD a year later. For this restoration, the movie was cropped to 16/9 instead of its original academy ratio and electronic stereo widening has replaced the original mono soundtrack, thus distorting the director’s original vision. The technical works was done by Prodigital Lab (owned by KRU Malaysia).

== Plot ==
The story is set in 1950 during the Malayan Emergency (1948-1960) in which communist guerrillas of the Malayan National Liberation Army (MNLA) fought against the British colonial government of Malaya. The plot follows the struggle of the Federation of Malaya Police and local community in Bukit Kepong, Johor, in fighting against an MNLA assault in 1950. The battle peaked by the MNLA attack of Bukit Kepong police station where 18 policemen were attached on the dawn of 23 February 1950. The film portrays the police force as having indomitable and heroic spirits, showing them fighting a series deadly battles to defend Malaya from attacks by "communist terrorists".

== Cast ==
- Jins Shamsuddin as Sergeant 3493 Jamil Bin Mohd Shah
- A. Rahim as Lance Corporal 7168 Jidin Bin Omar
- Hussein Abu Hassan as Police Constable (PC) 10533 Osman Yusoff
- Yusof Haslam as PC 8600 Jaafar Bin Hassan
- Dali Abdullah as PC 7493 Mohamad Bin Jaafar
- Shamsudin Baslah as PC 7862 Abdul Kadir Bin Jusoff
- J.A. Halim as Extra Police Constable (EPC) 3475 Mohd Tap Bin Lazim
- Hisham Ihsan as Village Chief Ali Bin Mustapha
- Mohd Noor Bon as Auxiliary Police (AP) 1925 Ali Akob Bin Othman
- Harun Ibrahim as AP 2130 Samad Bin Yatim
- Jamaliah Arshad as Mariam
- Edah Ahmad as Saadiah
- Suhaina Yahya as Fatimah
- Ayu Rahman as Pon
- Normah Alim as Arfah
- Noraini Talib as Fatimah Ya'aba
- Omar Suwita as Sa'ibun
- Norazizah Mohd Seh as Jamilah
- Ahmad Tarmizi Mad Zin as Mohd Nor
- Akhmal M.Zain as Hassan
- Norizan Hashim as Zainun
- Azizan Mokhtar as District Administration Officer (Malay: Pegawai Pentadbir Daerah)
- Mike Steward as Mr Davis
- Steven Wang as Tuck Sai
- James Ling as Ling
- Norazam Zakaria as Aziz
- Mohd Rashid Md Isa as Said
- Saadah Fadzil sebagai Saibun's wife
- Zambry Samad as Saibun's son
- Embong Azizah as Saibun's mother
- Low Hwee Luang as Ah Yau's wife
- Tan Mei Ling as Mei Ling (Ah Yau's daughter)

=== Extra cast ===
The Royal Malaysia Police (RMP) members were given the roles of extra casts in the film as:

- Members of Federation of Malaya Police, as the policemen of Bukit Kepong:
  - ACP Latifi Ahmad as PC 7645 Yusof Bin Rono
  - Inspector Zainal Abidin Bin Mohd as Pagoh District Police Chief (J.J. Raj)
  - Inspector Fauzy Bin Abu Bakar as EPC 3472 Ahmad Bin Khalid
  - Corporal Mohd Kurdi Bin Ismail as PC 9136 Hassan Bin Othman
  - Corporal Shukor Bin Daud as Marine Police Constable (MPC) 37 Abu Bakar Bin Daud
  - Corporal Abdul Ghani Bin Abdul as MM 5674 Abu Bin Mohd Ali
  - Corporal Abdullah Bin Jabar as AP 2127 Osman Bin Yahya
  - Constable Marsat Bin Jidin as Corporal 7068 Mohd Yassin Bin Haji Abdul Wahab
  - Constable Sukarman Bin Selamat as PC 3933 Hamzah Bin Ahmad
  - Constable Talib Bin Janggi as EPC 3795 Jaafar Bin Arshad
  - Constable Mat Saad as MPC 60 Ibrahim bin Adam
  - Constable Mohd Jan Bin Katan as MPC 68 Awang bin Ali
  - Constable Malek Baba as MPC 181 Basiron bin Adam
- Communist terrorists:
  - Sergeant Ng Thin Hong as Lee Tuan
  - Constable Chong Yun Fook as Kwan Pin
  - Constable Lam Seng Lan as Wing Chan
  - Constable Looi Thye Choe as Chin Siang
  - Constable Seah Lai Soon as Chan Fei
  - Constable Abdul Ghani Wahid as Leman
  - Constable Mohd Yatim as Malay communist
  - Constable Abdul Ghani Mohd Yusoff as Malay communist
  - Constable Yahya Nordin as Malay communist
- Bukit Kepong villagers:
  - Corporal Tham Chen Yao as Ah Yau
  - Constable Lee Seng Chong as Ah Siah
  - Woman Police Constable (WPC) Wong Chen Chu as Ah Siah's daughter

== Crew members ==
- Assistant Director – A. Rahim
- Technical Advisor – Inspector Fauzy Abu Bakar
- Technical Advisor – ACP Latifi Ahmad
- Song Converter – Inspector Abu Bakar Long
- Music Director – ACP Alias Arshad
- Film Editor – Johari Ibrahim
- Assistant Film Editor – Mariam Ibrahim
- Audio Recorder – Peter Lim
- Audio Recorder – Zulkifli Salleh
- Assistant Audio Recorder – Ahmad Tajudin
- Assistant Audio Recorder – Azmi Mohd Nor
- Cameraman – S.Mohan
- Assistant Cameraman – Ed Rizal
- Director of Art Setup & Set Designer – ACP Yusof Ariffin
- Set Designer – ACP Zakaria Mohammad

== Production ==
Director, producer and main actor, Jins Shamsuddin explained that this film was done based on the historical facts with the co-operation of Royal Malaysia Police (RMP) and Inspector-General of Police (IGP), Tun Mohammed Hanif Omar. He also interviewed former communist operatives who had surrendered after the Bukit Kepong police station attack incident and also Bukit Kepong villagers. Before production of the film, family members of Muhammad Indera, leader of the communist terrorists in the incident had met him and requested him not to show too much of the bad elements of Muhammad Indera.

== Accolades ==
| Award | Category | Recipients | Result |
|---|---|---|---|
| 3rd Malaysia Film Festival, 1982 | Best Film | Jins Shamsuddin | Won |
| 3rd Malaysia Film Festival, 1982 | Best Director | Jins Shamsuddin | Won |
| 3rd Malaysia Film Festival, 1982 | Best Actor | Jins Shamsuddin | Nominated |
| 3rd Malaysia Film Festival, 1982 | Special Juri Award | Jins Shamsuddin | Won |
| 3rd Malaysia Film Festival, 1982 | Best Screenplay | Aimi Jarr, Yusof Ariffin, Ismail Johari | Nominated |
| 3rd Malaysia Film Festival, 1982 | Best Supporting Actor | A. Rahim | Nominated |
| 3rd Malaysia Film Festival, 1982 | Best Supporting Actor | Hussein Abu Hassan | Nominated |
| 3rd Malaysia Film Festival, 1982 | Best Supporting Actress | Jamaliah Arshad | Nominated |
| 3rd Malaysia Film Festival, 1982 | Best Cameraman | S. Mohan | Won |
| 3rd Malaysia Film Festival, 1982 | Best Art Direction | Yusoff Ariffin | Won |
| 3rd Malaysia Film Festival, 1982 | Best Sound Direction | Peter Lim & Zulkifli Salleh | Won |
| 3rd Malaysia Film Festival, 1982 | Best New Actor | Suhaina Yahya | Won |
| 3rd Malaysia Film Festival, 1982 | Best New Actor | Dali Abdullah | Nominated |

== Novelization ==
The Bukit Kepong novel, written by Ismail Johari, was published by Dewan Bahasa dan Pustaka (DBP) in 1990. It was adopted as the Form 4 secondary school and Sijil Pelajaran Malaysia (SPM) literature component (Komsas, Malay: Komponen Sastera) teaching material.

== See also ==
- Bukit Kepong incident
- Bukit Kepong
- Royal Malaysia Police
- Malayan Communist Party
- Pengkhianatan G30S/PKI, a similar movie in Indonesia
