= Baharom =

Baharom is a Malasyian surname. Notable people with the surname include:

- Jamil Khir Baharom (born 1961), Malaysian politician
- Khairul Anuar Baharom (born 1974), Malaysian footballer
- Mohamed Faizal Baharom (born 1982), Malaysian weightlifter
- Mohd Nasriq Baharom (born 1987), Malaysian footballer
- Satya Baharom (1937–2005), Malaysian actress
