= Mariam Baharum =

Singaporean actress (1935–2010)

- مريم بهاروم
- Born: 21 August 1935; Straits Settlements (present-day Singapore)
- Died: 9 August 2010 (aged 74); Yishun, Singapore
- Other name: Mariam Tahi Lalat
- Occupation: Actress
- Years active: 1950–1968
- Relatives: Saadiah Baharom (sister); Rahimah Rahim (daughter)

Mariam Baharum (21 August 1935 – 9 August 2010) was an early Singaporean Malay film actress who was known for her work during the 1950s and 60s. She was nicknamed Mariam Tahi Lalat ("Mariam with the Mole") by her fans.

== Early life ==
Baharum was born on 21 August 1935 in Singapore. She was the sister of another Malay film actress, Saadiah, and the mother of pop singer, Rahimah Rahim.

== Career ==
Baharum's career reached its zenith during the 1950s as an actress signed to Malay Film Productions Ltd. (MFP) in Jalan Ampas, Singapore. Her most well-known movie was perhaps the 1952 film, Anjoran Nasib, which was directed B. S. Rajhans and co-starred P. Ramlee. In 1953, Baharum was named the "Second Favorite Female Artiste Malaya" by Filem Raya Magazine for her role in Anjuran Nasib.

Baharum other film credits included Aloha, Dewi Murni and Kembar, all of which were released in 1950. She appeared in the 1952 film, Aladdin, Kipas Hikmat in 1955, Abu Hassan Penchuri in 1955 and Antara Dua Darjat 1960. Baharum co-starred in her films with most of the major Malaysian film stars of the era, including Kasma Booty, Aziz Sattar, S. Shamsuddin, Osman Gumanti and Datuk Mustapha Maarof.

Baharum was nominated for the Veteran Actress Award at both the 15th Malaysian Film Festival in 2001 and the 22nd Kota Kinabalu Film Festival in 2009.

== Death ==
Mariam Baharum died at 5:50 a.m. on 9 August 2010, at her condo in Yishun, Singapore, at the age of 75. Baharum was buried at Abadi Muslim Cemetery in Choa Chu Kang, Singapore.

The Malaysian Minister of Information, Communications and Culture Rais Yatim paid tribute to Baharum, calling her death a major loss to the Malay film industry.

== Selected filmography ==
=== Film ===
| Year | Title | Role | Notes |
|---|---|---|---|
| 1950 | Kembar | — | |
| 1950 | Aloha | Aloha | |
| 1950 | Dewi Murni | | |
| 1952 | Aladdin | | |
| 1952 | Anjoran Nasib | Maimun | |
| 1955 | Abu Hassan Penchuri | Puteri Faridah | |
| 1955 | Kipas Hikmat | | |
| 1958 | Orang Minyak | | |
| 1960 | Antara Dua Darjat | Munah | |
| 1961 | Seniman Bujang Lapok | | |
