= Wheely (film) =

2018 Malaysian film

- Malaysian theatrical release poster
- Directed by: Yusry Abdul Halim
- Produced by: Norman Abdul Halim
- Production companies: Kartun Studios; KRU Studios
- Distributed by: Primeworks Studios
- Release date: 16 August 2018
- Running time: 90 minutes
- Country: Malaysia
- Languages: Malay; English
- Budget: 10,000,000 Malaysian ringgit
- Box office: $1,340,799

Wheely, also released as Wheely: Fast and Hilarious, is a 2018 Malaysian animated comedy film written and directed by Yusry Abd Halim as his first animated film. It was released in Malaysia on 16 August 2018.

== Plot ==
After a fierce crash, Wheely is demoted from a three-time rookie racer to a downtown taxi burdened with substantial debt and a bruised ego. The cause of the accident is none other than Putt Putt, his philosophical Feng Shui practitioner fan who becomes his best friend. Nothing dire occurs until Wheely discovers Bella, a wealthy supermodel. Things take a strange turn when she reveals that she has a boyfriend. Fortunately for Wheely, Bella appreciates his "street-smart, ghetto-like, and funny-guy" personality. However, their interactions are impeded by Ben, her snobbish boyfriend, who continually gets in the way. Despite everything, Wheely's situation becomes increasingly monotonous when Bella is "car-napped" by Kaiser, a monstrous 18-wheeler truck who has started a gang that disturbs the world.

== Cast ==
- Ogie Banks as Wheely, a shy and good-hearted yellow Mitsubishi Evo that suffers a racing accident, the main protagonist
- Gavin Yap as Putt Putt, a green Piaggio Vespa, Wheely's best friend
- Frances Lee as Bella, an attractive red Alfa Romeo GT
- Thomas Pang as Ben, a dark green Buick XP2000, Bella's ex-boyfriend
- Jay Sheldon as Frank, a rusty Frankenstein-looking Ford Econoline, that is known as a cardiologist. Sheldon also voices Bryan the Commentator, a blue helicopter who narrates Wheely's race
- Brock Powell as Kaiser, an evil blue Volvo FH, who is the leader of a luxury "car-napping" syndicate
- Raymond Orta as Parmo, a navy blue Mini Cooper, one of Kaiser's henchmen
- Armando Valdes-Kennedy as Rumble, a teal Chevrolet Camaro, one of Kaiser's henchmen
- Tamiyka White as Momma, a Jamaican-accented orange VW Beetle, Wheely's mother
- Barbara Goodson as Sergeant Street, a black and white Ford Crown Victoria, that takes care of Gasket City
- Chris Jai Alex as Crank, a ship that transports Kaiser
- Khairil Mokhzani Bahar as Joe Flo, a red 1991 Nissan Silvia
- Gavin Yap as Brad, an orange and white 2002 Subaru Impreza WRX STi. Yap also voices Ryan the Commentator a red helicopter who narrates Wheely's race
- Joe Murray as Royston, a wealthy blue 1960 Jaguar Mark 2, who is Ben's father
- Ghafir Akbar as the Director, an unnamed purple Willys model Jeep, who directs a commercial that Bella is acting in
- Diong Chae Lian as Amy, a yellow Daewoo Matiz, who is Wheely's biggest fan

== Production ==
Yusry Abdul Halim came up with the idea for the film in 2014 under the name of KL Taxi. But when we it get marketed the internationally buyers did not get the "KL" name. So Yusry immediately changed the title to Wheely.

His brother Norman added that the car photos went through various inspirations for the character designs, with the concept being expanded on the storyline. "We got two British writers who sneaked into the KRU Creative studios in Ipoh to work on the script but we eventually realized that the humour and sensibilities don't fit intro our movie. We wanted the movie to be have American charm rather than British, which explains why Wheely is not red and white like regular taxis in Malaysia "Yes but you know, back in the 80's our taxis were yellow and black, so it's still Malaysian in that sense," said Norman. Although the film is a fully Malaysian production, half of the animation was handled at Invector Heads studio in India and KRU produced stereoscopic 3D version exclusive for Russia.

== Release and reception ==
Wheely was released in Malaysia on 16 August 2018, and had a worldwide gross of $1,340,799, the highest grossing country being Poland with $348,806.

Wheely: Fast and Hilarious was also released in Australian theatres on November 9, 2018, distributed by Odin Eye's Entertainment alongside Universal Sony Pictures Home Entertainment.

Critically, the film received negative reviews, with critics calling it a mockbuster of Pixar Animation Studios's film Cars. But, according to Norman Abdul Halim, the movie is not a rip-off of Cars: "it has its own unique characters, designs, plot, storyline and flavour."
