= Abu Hassan Penchuri =

1955 film

- The one-sheet for Abu Hassan Penchuri
- Directed by: B. N. Rao
- Starring: P. Ramlee; Mariam Baharum
- Edited by: HR Narayana
- Music by: P. Ramlee
- Production company: Malay Film Productions
- Distributed by: Shaw Brothers
- Release date: 2 May 1955
- Running time: 110 minutes
- Countries: Singapore; Malaya
- Language: Malay

Abu Hassan Penchuri (English: Abu Hassan The Thief) is a 1955 Singaporean Malay-language black-and-white romantic fantasy film directed by B. N. Rao starring P. Ramlee, Mariam Baharum and Nordin Ahmad.

== Cast ==
- P. Ramlee as Abu Hassan
- Mariam Baharum (aka Tahi Lalat) as Puteri Faridah
- Nordin Ahmad as Putera Raja Tartar
- Mohd Hamid (Ahmad C) as Kassim
- Daeng Idris as Bapa Puteri Faridah
- Malik Sutan Muda
- S. Shamsuddin
- Ali Rahman
- Shariff Dol
- Wan Hazim
- Habsah
- Sarawan Singh
