= Antara Dua Darjat =

1960 film by P. Ramlee

- Directed by: P. Ramlee
- Written by: P. Ramlee
- Screenplay by: Omar Rojik
- Story by: Omar Rojik
- Starring: P. Ramlee; Saadiah; S. Kadarisman; S. Shamsuddin
- Cinematography: A. Bakar Ali
- Edited by: HR Narayana
- Music by: P. Ramlee
- Production company: Malay Film Productions
- Distributed by: Shaw Brothers
- Release date: 28 May 1960
- Running time: 129 minutes
- Country: Singapore
- Language: Malay

Antara Dua Darjat (English: Between Two Classes) is a 1960 Singaporean Malay-language black-and-white romantic melodrama film directed by and starring Malaysian silver-screen legend P. Ramlee and Saadiah. This film revolves around the obstacle of romance for a couple of lovers (P. Ramlee and Saadiah) due to family holdings that adhere to the ladder of rank and descent which cannot unite those of high rank and low rank thus triggering bloody conflict, mental stress, family feuds up to hypocrisy and soul murder.

== Plot ==
The film begins during a thunderstorm at Orchid Villa, a long-abandoned house now occupied by Tengku Mukri and Tengku Zaleha, a couple on their honeymoon, along with Dr. Tengku Aziz, Tengku Mukri's close friend. That night, Tengku Zaleha is awakened by a voice calling her name. Startled, she encounters a dark figure by the window, screams, and faints. Her husband and Dr. Tengku Aziz search the premises but find no explanation for her experience.

The figure, revealed to be Ghazali, returns home and speaks with his cousin, Sudin. Ghazali admits to repeatedly visiting Orchid Villa, where Tengku Zaleha once lived, and begins recounting their story. Tengku Zaleha and Ghazali first met on a rainy day when her car was stuck in the mud. Despite her father's disapproval due to their differing social status, Tengku Zaleha and Ghazali grew close. Ghazali was later hired as her piano teacher, and their affection deepened. However, one night they were caught, leading to Tengku Zaleha being violently taken home and Ghazali beaten nearly to death. Tengku Zaleha was presumed dead, while Ghazali survived but was haunted by guilt and the loss of his love.

Back at Orchid Villa, Tengku Zaleha asks for a piano tuner after discovering a key out of tune. Sudin persuades Ghazali to take the job despite his reservations. When Ghazali arrives, Tengku Zaleha appears not to recognize him, but as he finishes, she plays a song he once taught her. Suspicious, Dr. Tengku Aziz investigates Ghazali and learns from Sudin about Tengku Zaleha's presumed death and the toll it took on Ghazali.

Later, Tengku Mukri leaves for Singapore, entrusting Dr. Tengku Aziz to watch over Tengku Zaleha. That night, she sneaks out to meet Ghazali at their former meeting place. Initially maintaining a pretense, she eventually reveals the truth: her family had drugged her, taken her to Singapore, and forced her into a life of confinement. Her mother tried to defend her but was killed by her half-brother, who was later executed for the crime. These events drove her father insane, and he was institutionalized. A family friend later forced her into an arranged marriage with Tengku Mukri under an old contract.

After the wedding, Tengku Mukri offered to take Tengku Zaleha anywhere, but she chose Orchid Villa. Meanwhile, it is revealed that Tengku Mukri is having an affair and intends to divorce Tengku Zaleha after stealing her wealth. Upon returning to Orchid Villa, Dr. Tengku Aziz advises Tengku Mukri to let her be with Ghazali, but Mukri refuses, citing Ghazali's lack of noble blood. Their disagreement leads to a confrontation, during which Mukri tries to run Dr. Tengku Aziz off the road and ultimately shoots him, leaving him for dead.

Mukri then hunts Ghazali, intending to kill him, but is intercepted by Ghazali's mother and Tengku Zaleha. When Mukri's gun jams, Ghazali wrestles it from him during a struggle. A shot fires into the air, and Mukri collapses. With no further obstacles, Tengku Zaleha and Ghazali are finally free to be together.

== Cast ==
- P. Ramlee as Ghazali
- Saadiah as Tengku Zaleha
- Ahmad Nisfu as Tengku Karim
- Kuswadinata as Tengku Hassan
- S. Shamsuddin as Sudin, who is in love with Munah
- Yusof Latiff as Tengku Aziz
- S. Kadarisman as Tengku Mukri
- Aini Jasmin as Puteh
- Mariam Baharum as Munah
- Zainon Fiji as Mak Jah
- Rahimah Alias as Yang Chik, Zalehah's mother, who was murdered by Tengku Hassan
- Rahmah Rahmat as Normah
- Mustarjo as Wak Karto, who is trying to woo Munah
- Kemat Hassan as Tengku Ismail
- M. Rafiee as the driver
- Ali Fiji as Ali
- Kassim Masdor as Kassim
- S. Sudarmaji as Mahadi

== Songs ==
- Getaran Jiwa
- Selamat Panjang Umur
- Alunan Biola
