= Rahimah Rahim (singer, born 1955) =

- Born: 9 December 1955 (age 70); Singapore
- Education: Cairnhill Primary, First Toa Payoh Secondary School, Stamford College
- Occupations: Singer, actress
- Years active: 1970s–1980s 2003–present
- Spouse(s): Mohamed Noh Hussein (m. 1977–1988) Remy Taib (m. 1994)
- Children: 2 Girls Pearl and Amalyn
- Parent(s): Rahim Hamid; Mariam Baharum
- Relatives: Ahmad Daud (uncle); Saadiah (aunt); Rahman Rahim (brother, actor/lyricist); Rozie Rahim (sister, singer); Bat A. Latiff (eldest brother, actor/dance choreographer); Fauziah Ahmad Daud (cousin, actress)
- Musical career
- Genres: Pop, ballad, world music, traditional music
- Instrument: Vocals
- Labels: Senada Records; Josal Records; EMI, WEA Records, NSR Records.

Rahimah Rahim (born 9 December 1955) is a retired singer from Singapore. She has released 12 albums. On 24 November 2021, she was awarded the Cultural Medallion, Singapore's pinnacle arts award, by the National Arts Council of Singapore.

== Career ==
Rahimah had her first acting role at age six, when she played a little rich girl in Korban Kasih. As a child, she would perform with her father on television and in nightclubs. She performed in the television show Pak Awang Temberang (Mr Awang Temberang) in the 1960s. She also had film roles as a child in Masuk Angin Keluar Asap and Kasih Ibu.

Rahimah released her first album, entitled Mana Ibumu (Where has your mother gone?) in 1972, when she was 17. Her hit songs include "Doa" ("Prayer") and "Gadis Dan Bunga" ("Lasses And Blooms"). Her other albums include Gadis Dan Bunga and Bebas, both of which were produced by Johari Salleh and went gold. Her singing career took off in 1974 when she was the group champion and the grand champion in Kim Koso Talentime in Japan. She has since represented the SBC in the ASEAN Song Festival and in the Golden Bell Awards in Taiwan. She has sung in Malay, Indonesian, English, and Japanese.

In 1989, Rahimah went on a pilgrimage to Mecca and on her return, she retired from singing.

In 2003, Rahimah was invited by Life Records to re-record her 10 greatest hits.

Although she has performed on occasion for special events, most notably as a guest performer on Singapore Idol in September 2006, where her namesake, Rahimah Rahim, was a contestant, she has stated that she has no plans to come out of retirement.

Her 12th album, Awal & Kini (Before and Now) was a compilation of her greatest hits, released in October 2006.

In November 2006, Rahimah held a solo concert as part of the Esplanade's Pesta Raya festival which was almost fully sold out.

In 2010, Rahimah took part in a reproduction of Dick Lee's musical, Fried Rice Paradise, by the Singapore Repertory Theatre which was commissioned by the People's Association to celebrate its 50th anniversary.

In 2021, Rahimah was awarded the Cultural Medallion, Singapore's pinnacle arts award, by the National Arts Council of Singapore.

== Outside of singing ==
From 1990 to 1997, Rahimah ran a hair and bridal salon. She closed the salon to take care of her daughters. Afterwards, Rahimah had worked as a customer relations officer at a car rental company, then at a maid agency and as of 2006 at an insurance company. Rahimah is often recognized by customers at her place of work.

Rahimah was a partner in Directors' Team, which she co-founded with Malaysian lyricist, poet and scriptwriter, Habsah Hassan.

== Personal life ==
Rahimah is the daughter of Rahim Hamid, a singer from the 1950s, nicknamed the Nat King Cole of Singapore and was a popular club act in the 1950s and 1960s. Her mother, Mariam Baharom, an actress, who starred in movies during the Malay Film Productions' heyday in the 1950s. Rahimah is the eldest of four children.

Rahimah's uncle is singer Ahmad Daud and her aunt is Saadiah.

Rahimah married footballer Mohamed Noh Hussein in 1977, with whom she had a daughter in 1978, and whom she later divorced in 1988. She would later meet Remy Taib, a bank officer, at a party in 1989, and they married on 14 February 1994. They have a daughter who was born in 1995.

== Filmography ==
Year	Title	Role	Notes	Ref
1961	Korban Kasih			
	Anak Metropolitan (A Metropolitan Child)			
	Pak Awang Temberang			
	Masuk Angin Keluar Asap			
	Kasih Ibu			
2006	Not The First			

=== Theatre ===
Year	Title	Role	Notes	Ref
2010	Fried Rice Paradise			

== Discography ==
Singles & EPs

- Mana Ibumu (1970)
- Soreh Soreh (1972)
- Kebersehan Satu Keimanan (1972)
- Senangkan Hati (1972)
- Zaman Pancharoba (1972)
- Pemuda Tampan (1972)
- Bintang Sukanku (1974)
- Posnita (1975)
- Renungan (1976)

Albums

- Rahimah Rahim (1970)
- Belajar Membaca (1974)
- Lagu Untukmu (1974)
- Penghibor Di Rantau (1979)
- Gadis Dan Bunga (1982)
- Bebas (1984)
- Hello (1986)
- Kembang Tak Jadi (1988)
- Masihkah Ada Cinta, released in February 1987
- Hati Yang Rapuh (1990)
- Doa (1991)
- Awal & Kini (Before And Now), released in October 2006

Compilations

- Dwi Intan: Masihkah Ada Cinta / Asmara (Rahimah Rahim / Anita Sarawak) (2000)
- Suatu Memori (2003)
