= Musang Berjanggut =

1959 film by P. Ramlee

- Directed by: P. Ramlee
- Written by: P. Ramlee
- Starring: P. Ramlee; Saadiah; Ahmad Nisfu
- Music by: P. Ramlee
- Production company: Malay Film Productions
- Distributed by: Shaw Brothers
- Release date: August 1, 1959
- Countries: Malaysia; Singapore
- Language: Malay

Musang Berjanggut (English: The Bearded Fox) is 1959 Singaporean Malay-language black-and-white period romantic comedy film directed by and starring P. Ramlee. The story is in the style of a traditional Malay folktale, featuring supernatural elements and a story with an underlying moral. The plot follows the adventures of a prince named Tun Nila who sets out to find a woman who will marry him, and what happens when he finds her at last.

== Plot ==
Tun Nila Utama, the adopted prince of Pura Cendana, is instructed by the king to choose a bride. Tun Nila, however, refuses to marry any woman in the kingdom, declaring they lack honor and are not true "females." Angered by his claim, the king orders him to find such a woman, if she exists. Tun Nila vows not to return to Pura Cendana or shave until he fulfills this quest.

To test a woman’s worthiness, Tun Nila devises a challenge: he carries a bag containing a mix of rice, salt, chili, onions, garlic, and spices. He will marry the woman who can cook using the bag’s contents. Tun Nila travels across the country, seeking shelter wherever he can. In each home with a young woman, he presents the challenge. All of them dismiss the task as impossible or consider him insane, returning the bag untouched. Over time, Tun Nila grows a thick beard as his search proves fruitless.

Eventually, Tun Nila meets Puspawangi, a young woman of remarkable intelligence, and visits her family. When he gives them the bag and makes his request, Puspawangi’s mother calls it absurd, but Puspawangi sees the challenge as a test of wit. She meticulously separates the ingredients, cooks them, and serves a meal to her family that night. Her father is astonished when she reveals the dishes were made from the bag’s contents.

Impressed, Tun Nila shaves his beard the next morning, revealing his handsome face. He explains his quest to Puspawangi’s father and asks for her hand in marriage. When they return to the palace, Tun Nila's parents are overjoyed. However, the king and his ministers, captivated by Puspawangi’s beauty, conspire to eliminate Tun Nila. The king feigns illness and claims that only the mystical bearded civet can cure him. Advising that the civet fears women, the ministers send Tun Nila alone to search for it, leaving Puspawangi behind.

During Tun Nila’s absence, the king and his ministers visit Puspawangi one by one, attempting to win her affections. Puspawangi cleverly deceives them, pretending to reciprocate while stalling for time. She humiliates each man by urging them to prove their love through ridiculous tasks and convinces them to hide when the next suitor arrives. The king is the last visitor, but their encounter is interrupted by a "ghost" at the window. Terrified, the king and most ministers flee, while one minister hides in a chest. The "ghost" is revealed to be Tun Nila in disguise, who overheard everything from his hiding place beneath the house. He commends Puspawangi for her loyalty and wit in rebuffing the men’s advances.

The next day, Tun Nila and Puspawangi present the chest to the king, claiming it contains the bearded civet. When the king opens it, the trapped minister is exposed, and the guilty men realize their wrongdoing. They beg for forgiveness, and order is restored.

== Cast ==
- P. Ramlee as Tun Nila Utama, aka Raja Muda Pura Cendana
- Saadiah as Puspawangi
- Raden Sudiro as Puspawangi’s father
- Momo Latiff as Puspawangi’s mother
- Ahmad Nisfu as Sultan Alam Syahbana
- Habsah Buang as Permaisuri Pura Cendana
- Udo Omar as Datuk Bendahara
- Malik Sutan Muda as Datuk Bentara Mangku Bumi
- Nyong Ismail as Datuk Pujangga
- Mustarjo as Datuk Nikah Kahwin
- M. Babjan as Kelopak Salak, Tun Nila Utama's biological father
- Zainon Fiji as Biji Saga, Tun Nila Utama's biological mother
- Shariff Dol as Megat Alam Sengketa
- A. Rahim as Thug 1
- Ahmad C as Thug 2
- M. Rafiee as Thug 3
- Ali Fiji as Thug 4
- Bad Latiff as The main Tun Nila Utama during childhood
- Sazali P. Ramlee as The main Tun Nila Utama during infancy
- Mahmud Hitam as Tun Nila Utama main martial arts teacher
- Ahmad Chetty as Satay seller
- Jah Mahadi as Bunga Kemuning
- Raja Hamidah
- Osman Botak as Marriage members

== Songs ==
- Joget Pura Chendana
- Wahai Nenek/Cucu-Cucu
- Mari Kita Ke Ladang
- Jangan Adik Angan-angan

== See also ==
- List of P. Ramlee films
