= GA Personal Defense Weapon =

GA 10" Personal Defense Weapon (PDW)
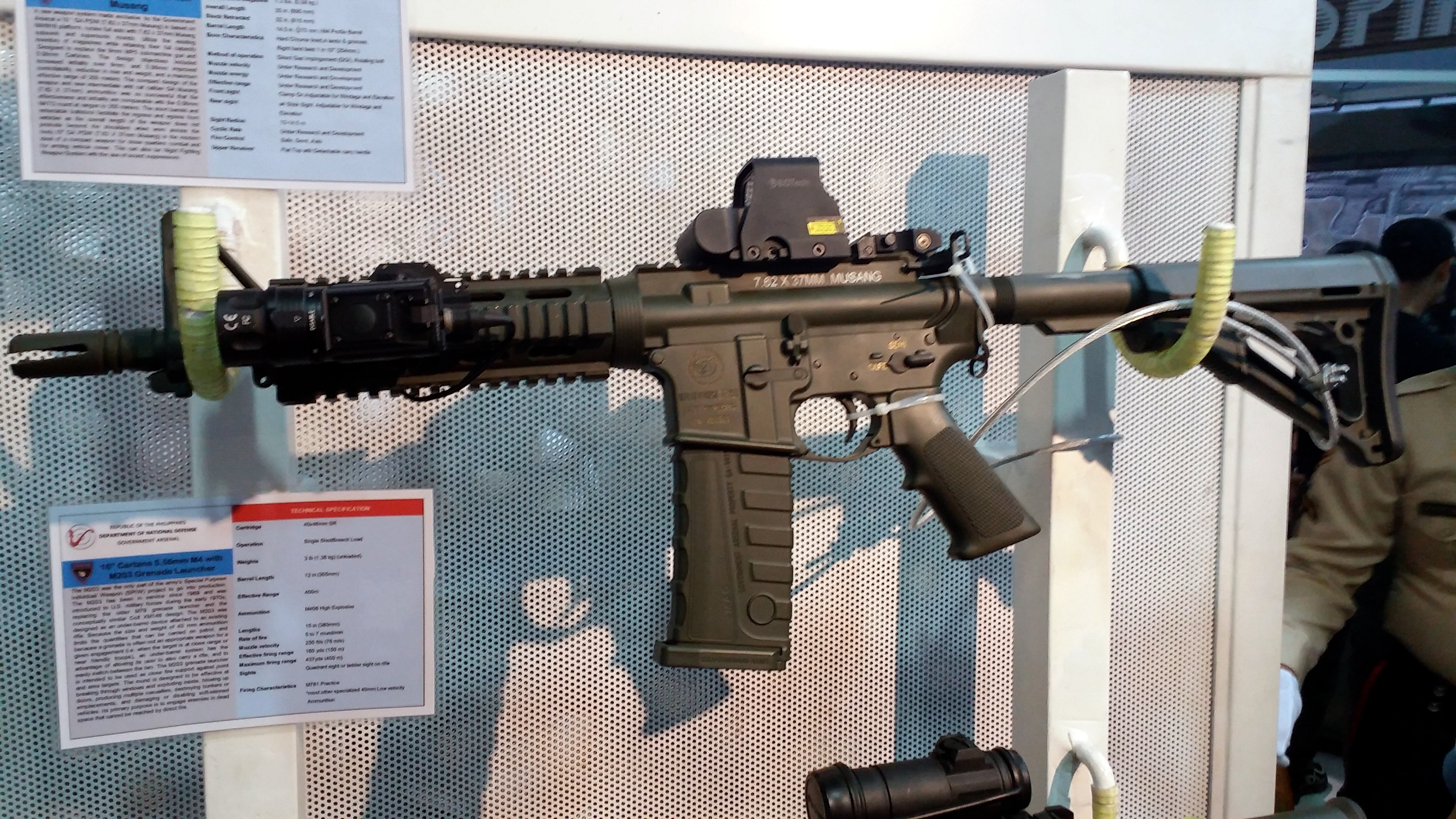
- GA PDW with EOTech holographic sight
- Type: Personal defense weapon Carbine
- Place of origin: Philippines

Production history
- Designer: Government Arsenal (Philippines)
- Designed: 2011
- Manufacturer: Government Arsenal (Philippines)
- No. built: Preproduction prototypes only
- Variants: 10" PDW

Specifications
- Mass: 6 lb (2.7 kg) empty 7.3 lb (3.3 kg) with 30 rounds
- Length: 35 in (890 mm) (stock extended); 32 in (810 mm) (stock retracted)
- Barrel length: 10 in (250 mm)
- Cartridge: 7.62×37mm Musang
- Caliber: 7.62 mm (.308 in)
- Action: Gas-operated, rotating bolt (Direct impingement)
- Effective firing range: 300 m (330 yd) effective
- Feed system: 30-round box magazine or other STANAG magazines.
- Sights: Iron sights or various optics

The GA Personal Defense Weapon (PDW) is a select-fire sub-carbine made by the Philippine Government Arsenal. It is based on the M4 carbine/M16 rifle and is chambered in the locally developed 7.62×37mm Musang cartridge.

== History ==
50 prototypes of the weapon underwent field testing and evaluation with Special Operations units of the Armed Forces of the Philippines (AFP) in June 2015.

The weapon was on display at the Asian Defense and Security (ADAS) 2016 event.

== Design ==
Designed to replace the MP5 and short-barrelled 5.56mm carbines in AFP service, its design objectives included increased lethality over subsonic 9mm and 5.56mm cartridges, improved controllability, reduction in size and weight, and a maximum effective range of 300 meters.
