= Sergeant Hassan =

1958 film by Lamberto Avellana

Sarjan Hassan
- Directed by: Lamberto Avellana; P. Ramlee (uncredited)
- Written by: Ralph Modder
- Screenplay by: P. Ramlee
- Story by: Ralph Modder
- Produced by: Run Run Shaw
- Starring: P. Ramlee; Saadiah; Jins Shamsuddin; Salleh Kamil; Daeng Idris
- Cinematography: Abu Bakar Ali
- Edited by: Hayat Harris; H.R. Narayana
- Music by: P. Ramlee
- Production company: Malay Film Productions
- Distributed by: Shaw Brothers
- Release date: 28 August 1958
- Country: Singapore
- Language: Malay

Sarjan Hassan (English: Sergeant Hassan) is 1958 Singaporean Malay-language black-and-white war drama film starring P. Ramlee. The film is set during the Japanese invasion of Malaya during the Second World War. Initially, the film was supposed to be directed by Lamberto Avellana; however, he was unable to fully complete the film. The directing task was later taken over by P. Ramlee.

== Plot ==
Sergeant Hassan (P. Ramlee) was 10 when his father died. His mother had died when he was younger. His late father's boss feels sorry for Hassan and adopts him. However, Hassan's foster brother, Aziz (Jins Shamsuddin) is jealous of Hassan . Even when both of them have fully grown up, Aziz and Buang (Salleh Kamil) always bully Hassan together. At the same time, Salmah (Saadiah) has developed a crush towards Hassan, fuelling Aziz's fury even higher. When the Second World War is approaching, the Royal Malay Regiment begins recruiting young soldiers to fight against the war.

Aziz joins the Royal Malay Regiment, but Hassan was forbidden to join them even if he wanted because of his foster father who orders him to take care of his orchard instead. Due to this, the villagers start calling him a coward and giving him other names. Consequently, he runs away from home to join the Regiment. Hassan wants to prove to the villagers that he is capable to be a good soldier. Not long after, he was promoted as a Sergeant.

When the Japanese invaded Malaya, Sergeant Hassan with his comrades fight them bravely. Hassan also saves Aziz who is made a POW by the Japanese. At the same time, Buang becomes a traitor of his own nation by becoming a member of the Japanese secret agent Kempeitai. Buang uses his powers to raid the village and to force Salmah to marry him. When the Japanese surrendered, Sergeant Hassan and his comrades liberate his home village, while Hassan himself defeats Buang in a one-on-one fight.

== Cast ==
- P. Ramlee as Sergeant Hassan
- Saadiah as Salmah
- Jins Shamsuddin as Aziz
- Salleh Kamil as Buang
- Daeng Idris as Pak Lebai (father Aziz)
- Aini Jasmin as Minah (Pak Lebai's maid)
- Captain John Gray as Captain Holiday - RMR (platoon Singapore)
- Captain David Downe as Lieutenant - RMR (platoon Tanah Melayu)
- Nyong Ismail as father Salmah
- Leng Husin as Ah Leng (sweetheart)
- Omar Rojik as Head of The Kampeitai in Tanah Melayu
- M. Rafiee, Kemat Hassan, Omar Suwita and Ali Fiji as friend Aziz
- Zainol Bakar as Sergeant Pon
- S. Shamsuddin as Chef (platoon Singapore)
- H.M Rohaizad as Rashid (platoon Singapore)
- Kassim Masdor as Singapore Soldier (cameo)
- Zainol Abbas as Hassan (childhood)
- Adik Jaafar as Aziz (childhood)
- Adik Habibah Haron as Salmah (childhood)

== See also ==
- P. Ramlee
- List of P. Ramlee films
