= Government Arsenal =

Agency of the Philippine government

- Pagawaan ng Punglo at Sandata
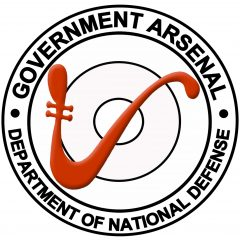

Agency overview
- Formed: June 22, 1957; 69 years ago
- Headquarters: Camp General Antonio Luna, Limay, Bataan, Philippines
- Employees: 576 (2024)
- Annual budget: ₱1.30 billion (2020)
- Agency executives: Florante M. Amano, Government Arsenal Director; Arnold Rafael Y. Depakakibo, Government Arsenal Assistant Director
- Parent agency: Department of National Defense
- Website: www.arsenal.mil.ph

Government Arsenal
- Type: State-owned company
- Industry: Defense, Industrial
- Founded: 1957
- Headquarters: Camp General Antonio Luna, Limay, Bataan, Philippines
- Products: Military and civilian products

The Government Arsenal (GA) is an agency of the Philippine government under the Department of National Defense, responsible for the production of basic weaponry and ammunition. GA and Elisco Tool Manufacturing Company were among the firearms companies known for manufacturing M16 rifles for the Armed Forces of the Philippines (AFP) and the Philippine National Police (PNP) before the latter was defunct. (Note: Other companies known to manufacture M16-type rifles for AFP/PNP/other law enforcement agency contracts include the United Defense Manufacturing Corporation and Shooter Arms.)

GA is led by Florante M. Amano (Director) and Arnold Rafael Y. Depakakibo (assistant director).

== History ==
GA was established through Republic Act No. 1884, which was signed into law on June 22, 1957, the Arsenal is a line bureau under the Department of National Defense. It was only on March 7, 1967, that a presidential proclamation on its present site at Limay, Bataan was declared. Accordingly, on October 12, 1967, the groundbreaking materialized at the spot where the statue of General Antonio Luna now stands. The 514th and 564th Engineering Construction Battalions of the 51st Engineering Brigade of the Armed Forces of the Philippines (AFP) were tasked with the construction of GA facilities.

On August 15, 1971, the first SAA cartridge rolled out of the GA's production assembly line. Three years later, the integrated SAA manufacturing began, with all components - case, primer, propellant powder, and bullet assembled into a complete cartridge.

On February 23, 1995, Republic Act 7898, otherwise known as the AFP Modernization Act, was enacted. Republic Act 7898 likewise provides for the modernization of the Government Arsenal for the development of production capabilities to enhance self-sufficiency in defense requirements. Specifically, Section 12 of this Act mandates that "the government arsenal shall be utilized in the production of basic weapons, ammunition and other munitions for the use of the Armed Forces of the Philippines and the Philippine National Police (PNP), as well as for the sale and export of products in excess of AFP/PNP requirements."

As part of the modernization effort, the arsenal, through the Department of National Defense, issued an invitation to bid for a Multi-Station Bullet Assembly Machine for 5.56mm M193/M855 in August 2009. This marked a significant expansion of existing production lines. Bids failed on December 4, 2009, and on March 10, 2010.

On November 15, 2012, the Arsenal established its Small Arms Repair and Upgrade Unit (SARUU) to handle the repair, refurbishment, upgrading, and enhancement of the firearms of the military and law enforcement services.

According to a 2016 report from the Commission on Audit, GA reportedly missed targeted deadlines for ammunition production, putting the blame on antiquated machinery that are between 12-39 years old.

On November 14, 2018, Arsenal signed a co-production agreement with Samyang Comtech Co. Ltd. of South Korea to manufacturing and testing facilities within the Government Arsenal complex for the produce of armor vests and ballistic helmets.

On April 5, 2019, the arsenal broke ground for two major production facilities under co-production agreements with South Korean firms: a force protection equipment manufacturing plant in partnership with Samyang Comtech and a 5.56mm magazine manufacturing plant in partnership with Buhueng Precision.

On May 29, 2021, an accidental explosion killed two GA employees.

On June 28, 2022, GA and Bataan City officials signed a memorandum of agreement to expand GA's estate in the freeport area.

On January 23, 2023, DND Secretary Carlito Galvez Jr. proposed that ammo made by GA be turned into training ammo due to concerns about ammunition wastage.

== Location ==
GA is located in Barangay Lamao, Limay, Bataan on a 370-hectare defense industrial estate. The area has a total of 370.37 hectares.

== Ammunition Marking System ==
Small arms ammunition manufactured by the Government Arsenal can be identified by the headstamp code: "RPA". This acronym stands for "Republic of the Philippines Arsenal".

In 2011, a new standard coding system was adopted by the arsenal following its formulation and final approval in October of the previous year. This replaced the previous coding system which was derived from the product codes of foreign manufacturers using a combination of English and Metric/Système International (SI) units.

The revised system uses simplified alphanumeric designations that make reference to the ammunition's caliber and type for ease of identification while avoiding unnecessary complications caused by the use of mixed English & SI units and designations based on different foreign code systems.

Description	Existing Code	Revised GA Code
M193 5.56MM, BALL	5.56MM M193 BALL	GA 556100
M855 / SS109 5.56MM	5.56MM M855	GA 556110
5.56MM, ARMOUR PIERCING AMMUNITION	-	GA 556200
5.56MM, ARMOUR PIERCING INCENDIARY	-	GA 556300
5.56MM, BLANK	5.56MM BLANK	GA 556400
5.56MM, MATCH (55 GRAINS)	-	GA 556500
5.56MM, MATCH (69 GRAINS)	-	GA 556505
5.56MM, TRACER	-	GA 556600
M80 CARTRIDGE, 7.62MM, BALL, BOAT TAIL	7.62MM M80 BALL	GA 762100
M80A CARTRIDGE, 7.62MM, BALL, SQUARE BASE	7.62MM M80A BALL	GA 762105
7.62MM, ARMOUR PIERCING INCENDIARY	-	GA 762300
7.62MM, BLANK	-	GA 762400
M852 CARTRIDGE, 7.62MM, MATCH	-	GA 762500
7.62MM, TRACER	7.62MM, M62 (GM) TRACER	GA 762600
CAL .45, M1911, BALL	CAL.45 M1911 BALL	GA 45100
CAL .45, M1911, TRAINING SWC (190 GRAINS)	-	GA 45110
CAL .45, M1911, TRAINING RN (210 GRAINS)	-	GA 45115
9MM PARABELLUM, BALL	9MM PARABELLUM BALL	GA 9100
CAL .30 M1	CAL .30 M1 BALL	GA 30100
CAL .30 M2	CAL .30 M2 BALL	GA 30105
CAL .50 M33	CAL .50 M33 BALL	GA 50100
CAL .38 SPL 158 LRN	CAL.38 SPL 158 LRN	GA 38700

To improve the accounting and traceability of government-produced munitions, the Government Arsenal has endeavored to implement laser engraving technology into its ammunition production process as part of the modernization of its production lines, making it the first domestic ammunition manufacturer to do so. This involved the acquisition of a laser marking and packaging machine for use with 5.56mm and 7.62mm ammunition. Information on each ammunition batch produced will be stored in a database allowing for easier accounting of the origin, transfer, receipt, utilization and/or disposal of ammunition.

== Images ==
Government Arsenal Ammunition
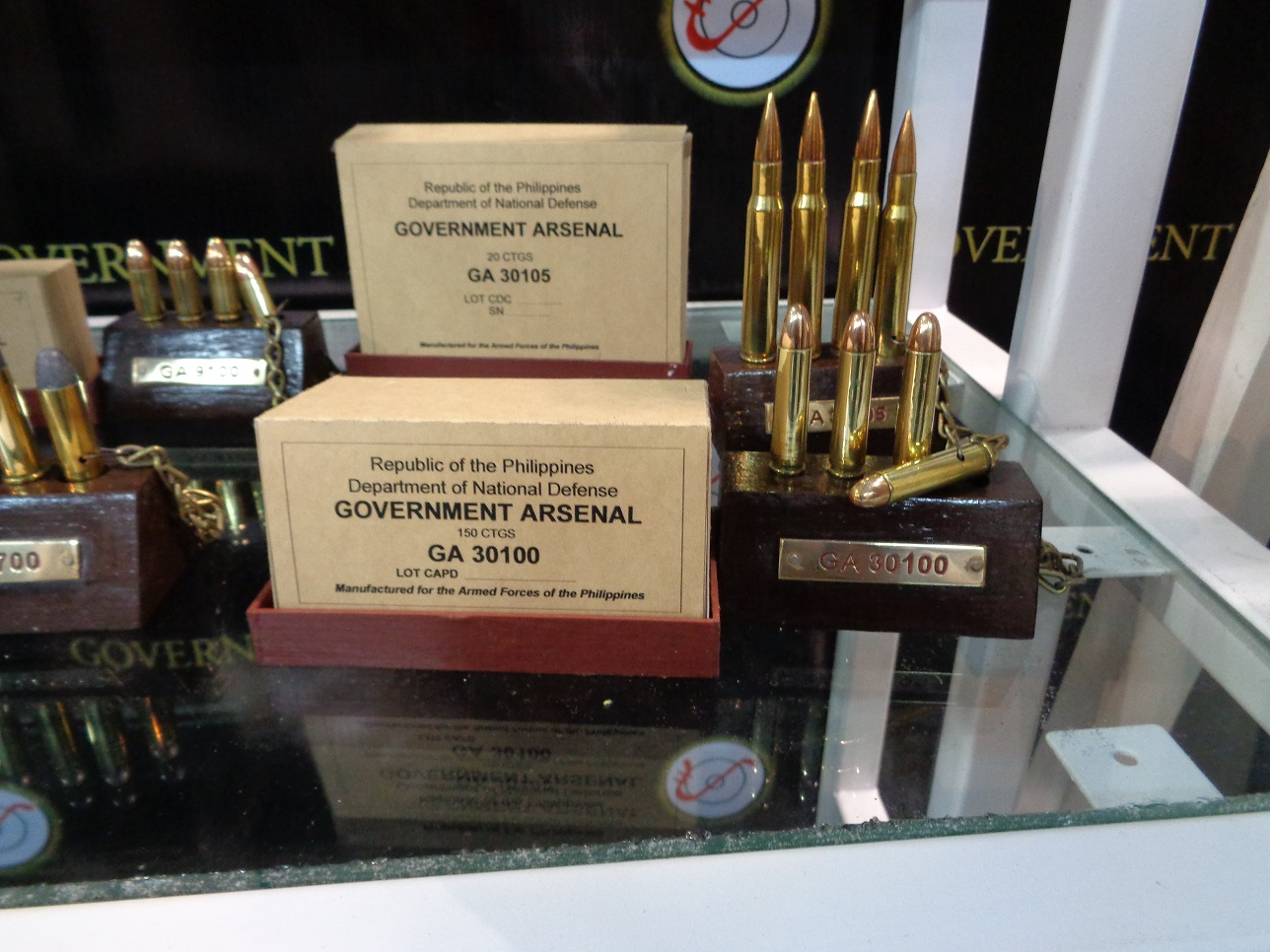
.30 Carbine & .30-06 Springfield

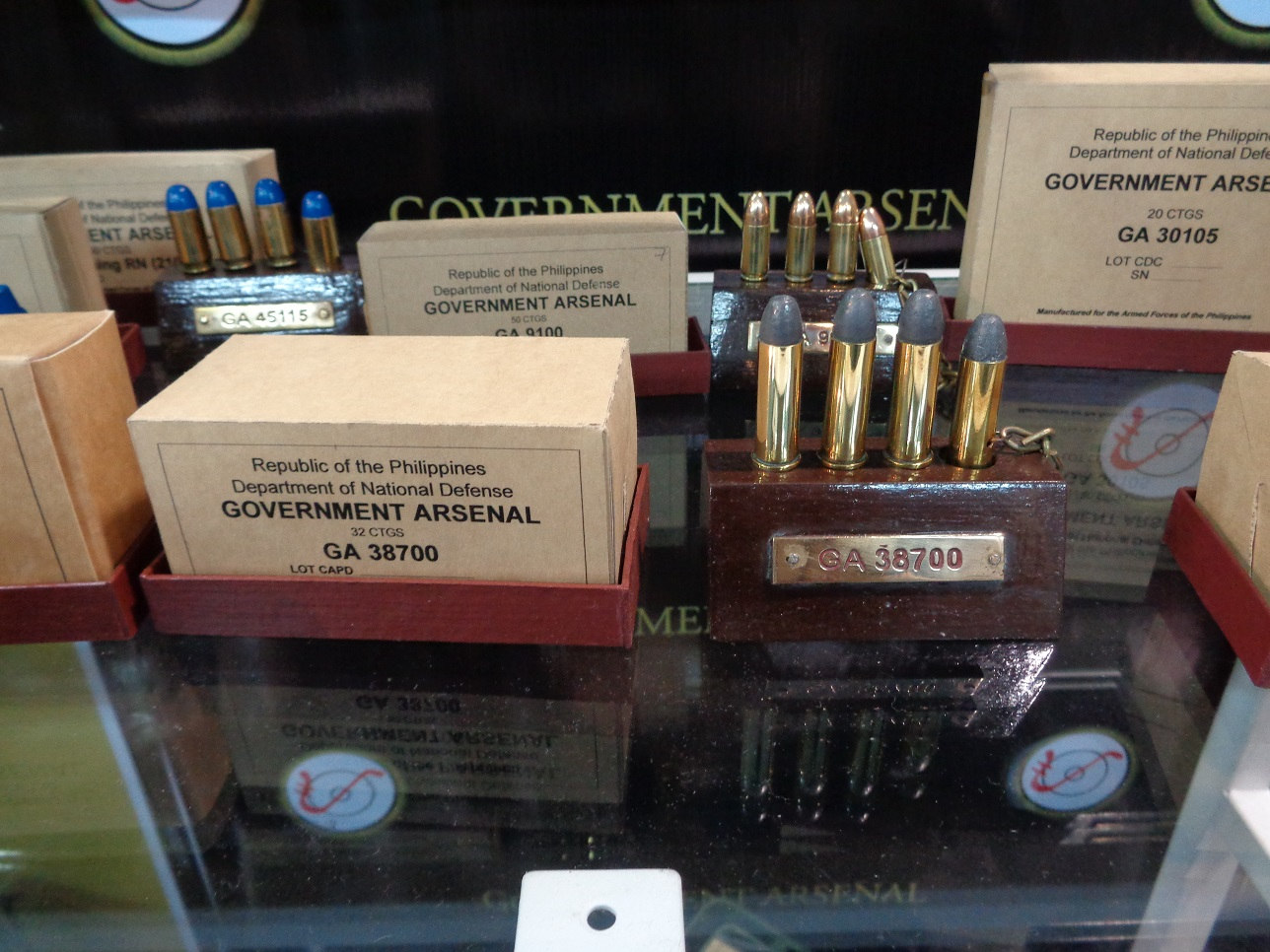
.38 Special & 9x19mm Parabellum

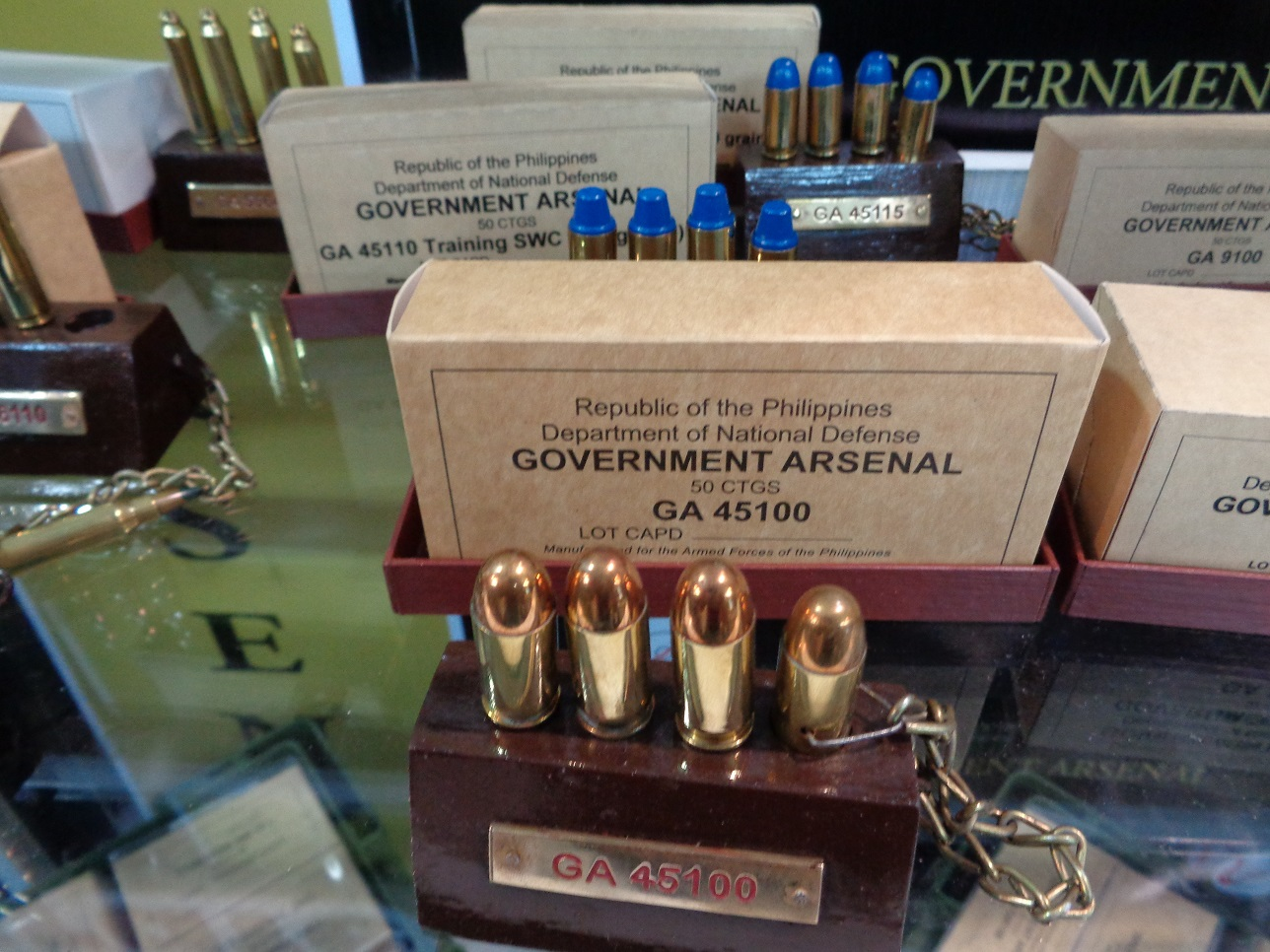
Cal .45, M1911, Ball

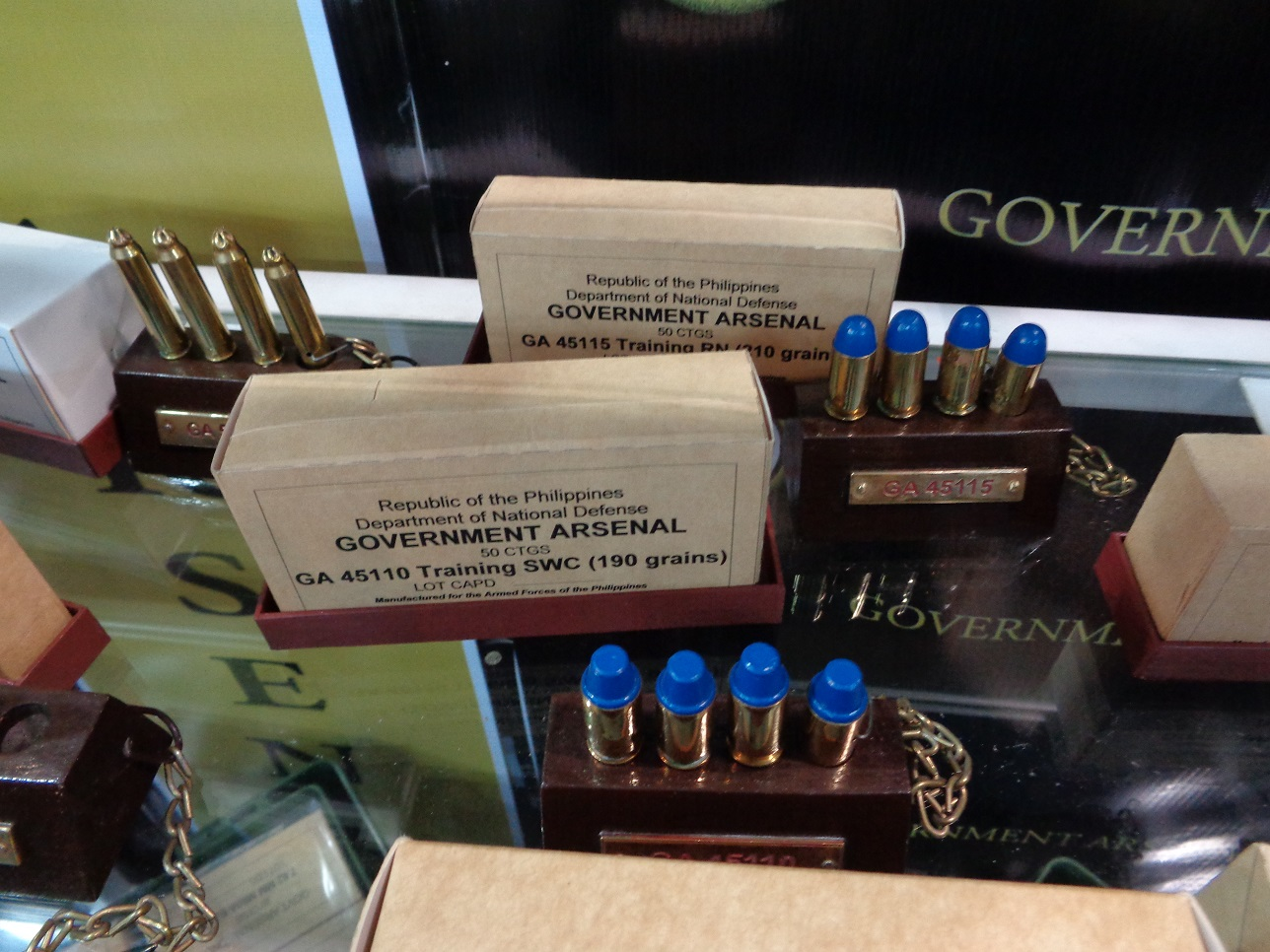
45 ACP Training (Teflon-coated SWC & RN)

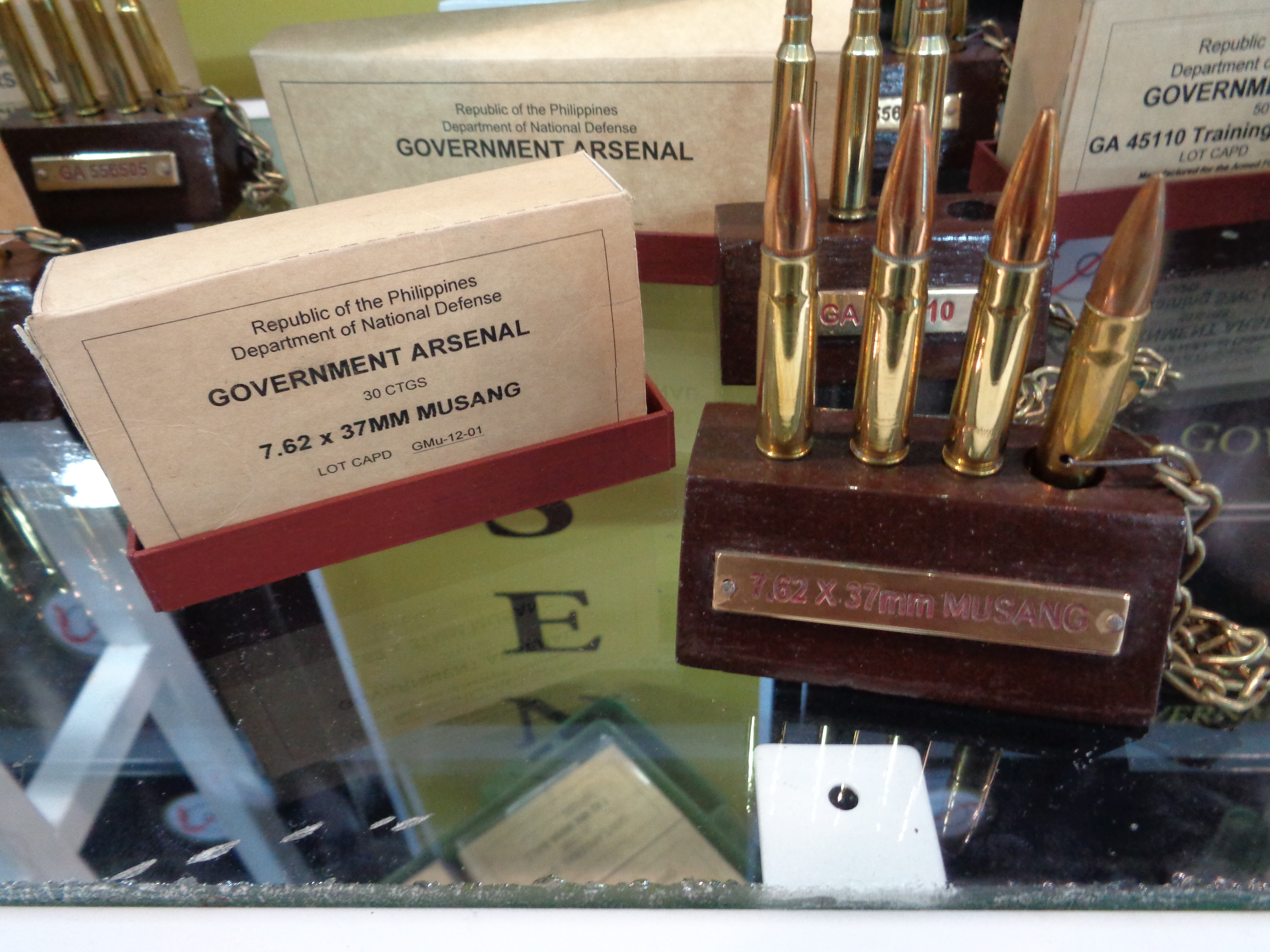
7.62×37mm Musang

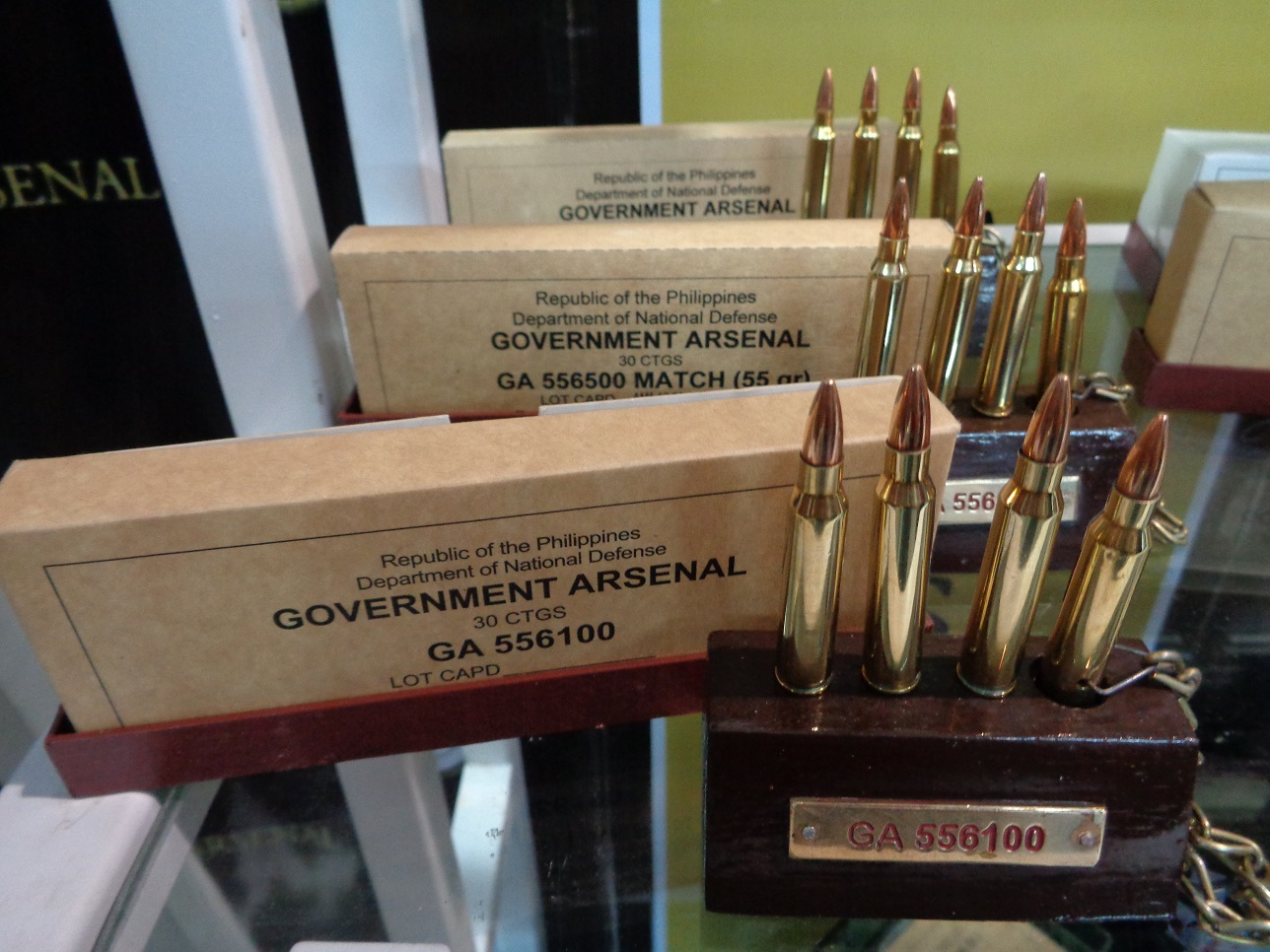
5.56x45mm Ball (M193)

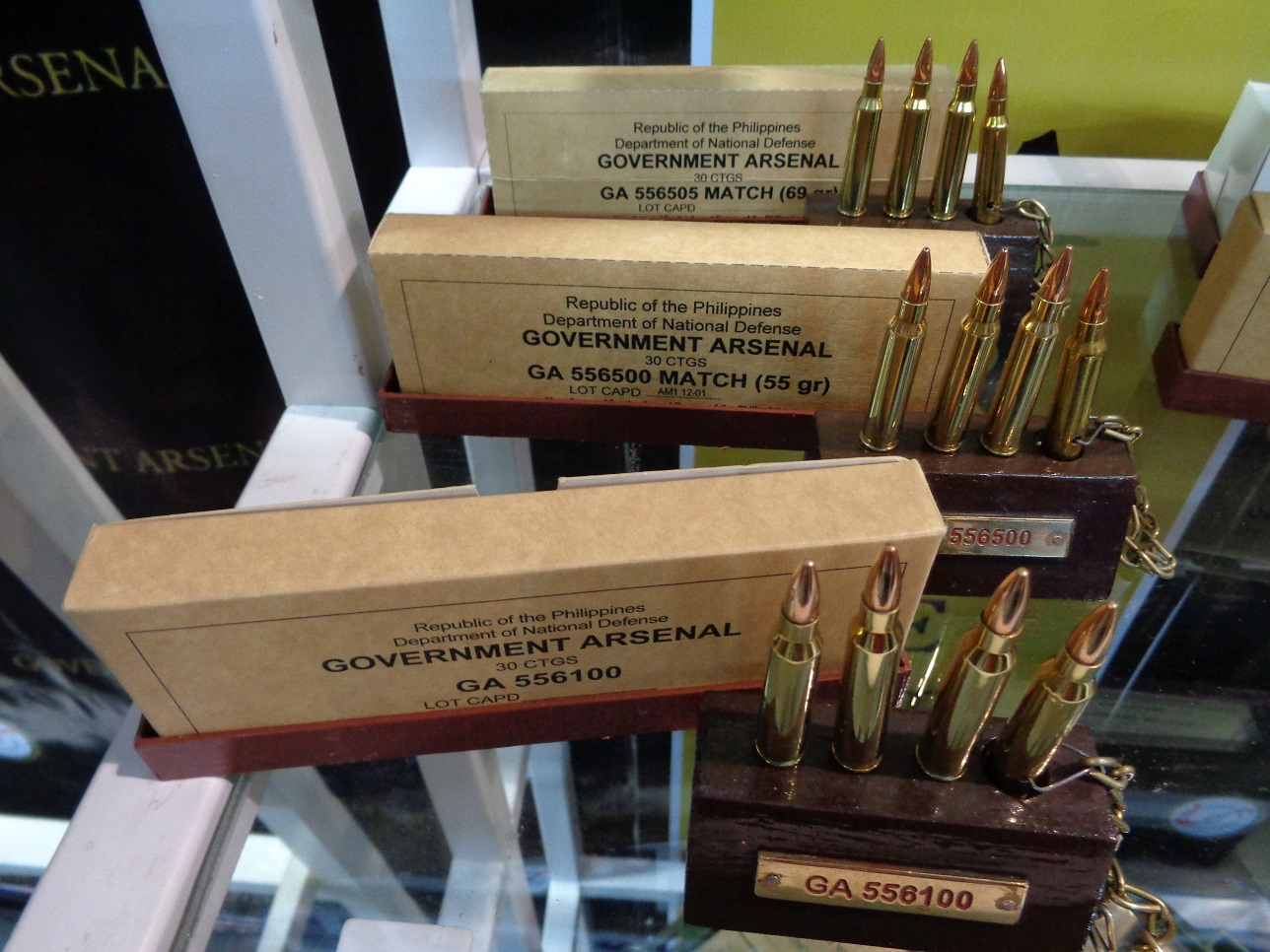
5.56x45mm Ball (M193), Match (55 gr & 69 gr)

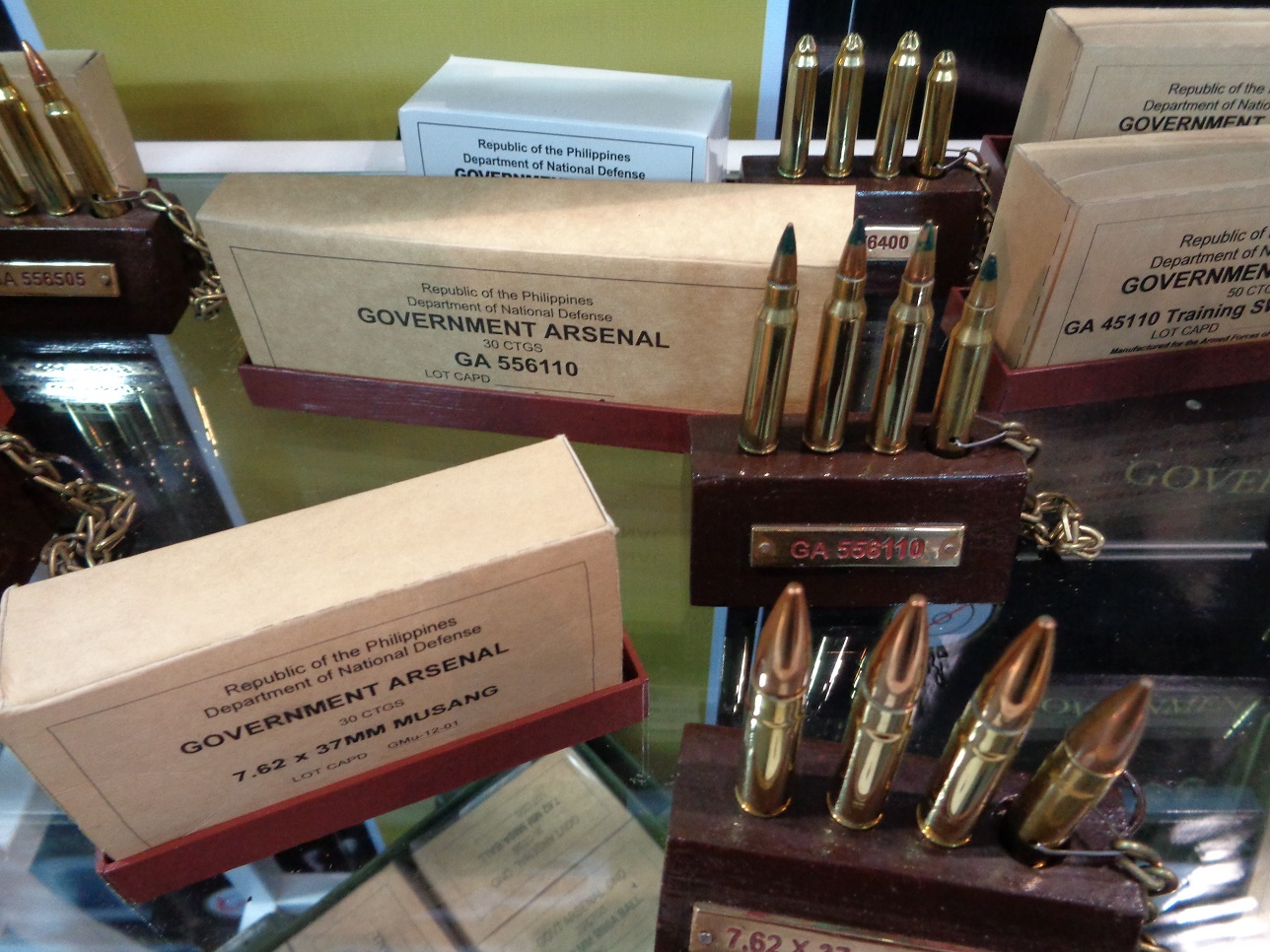
5.56x45mm NATO (M855, SS109) & Blank

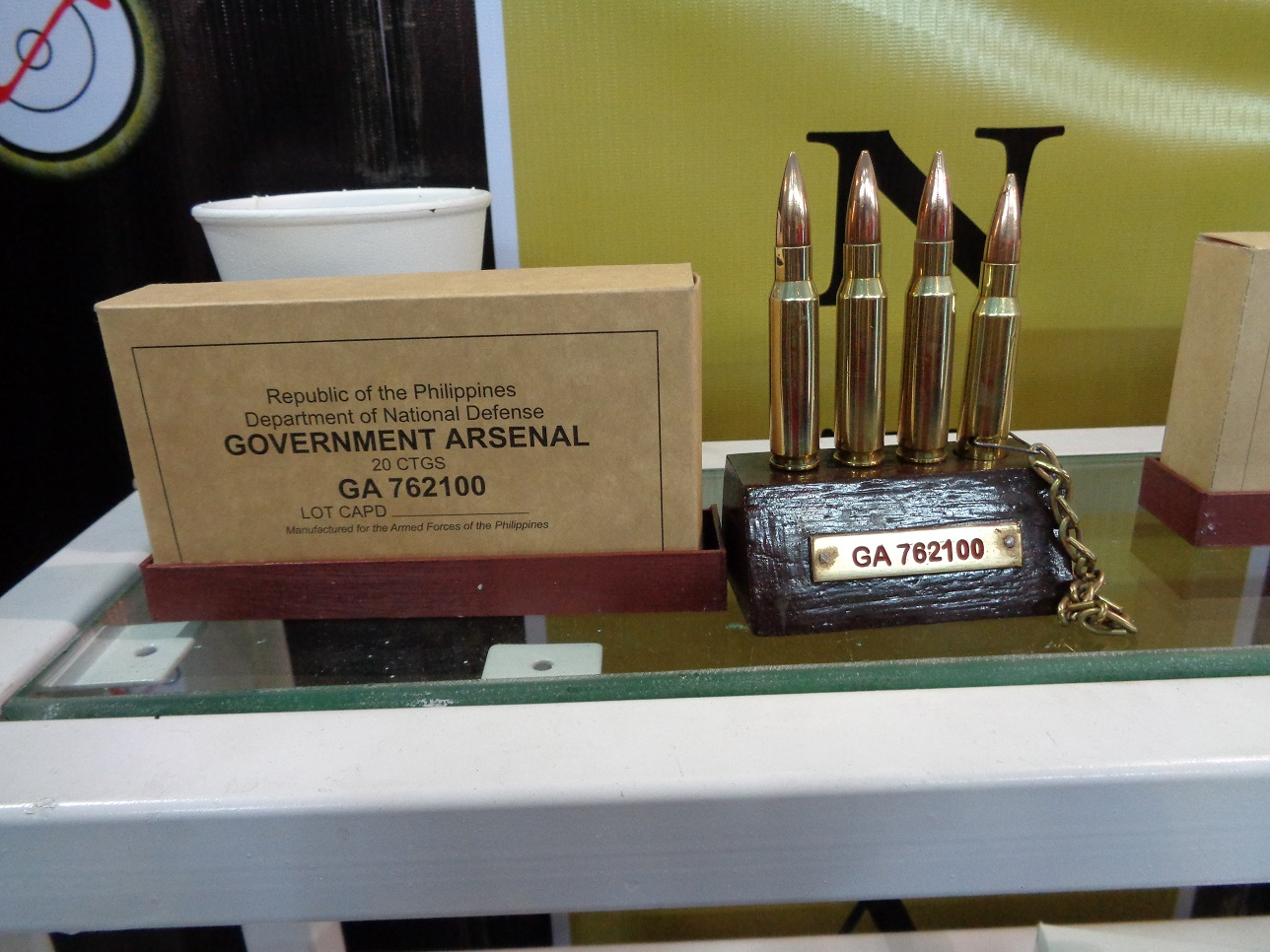
7.62×51mm NATO Ball (M80)

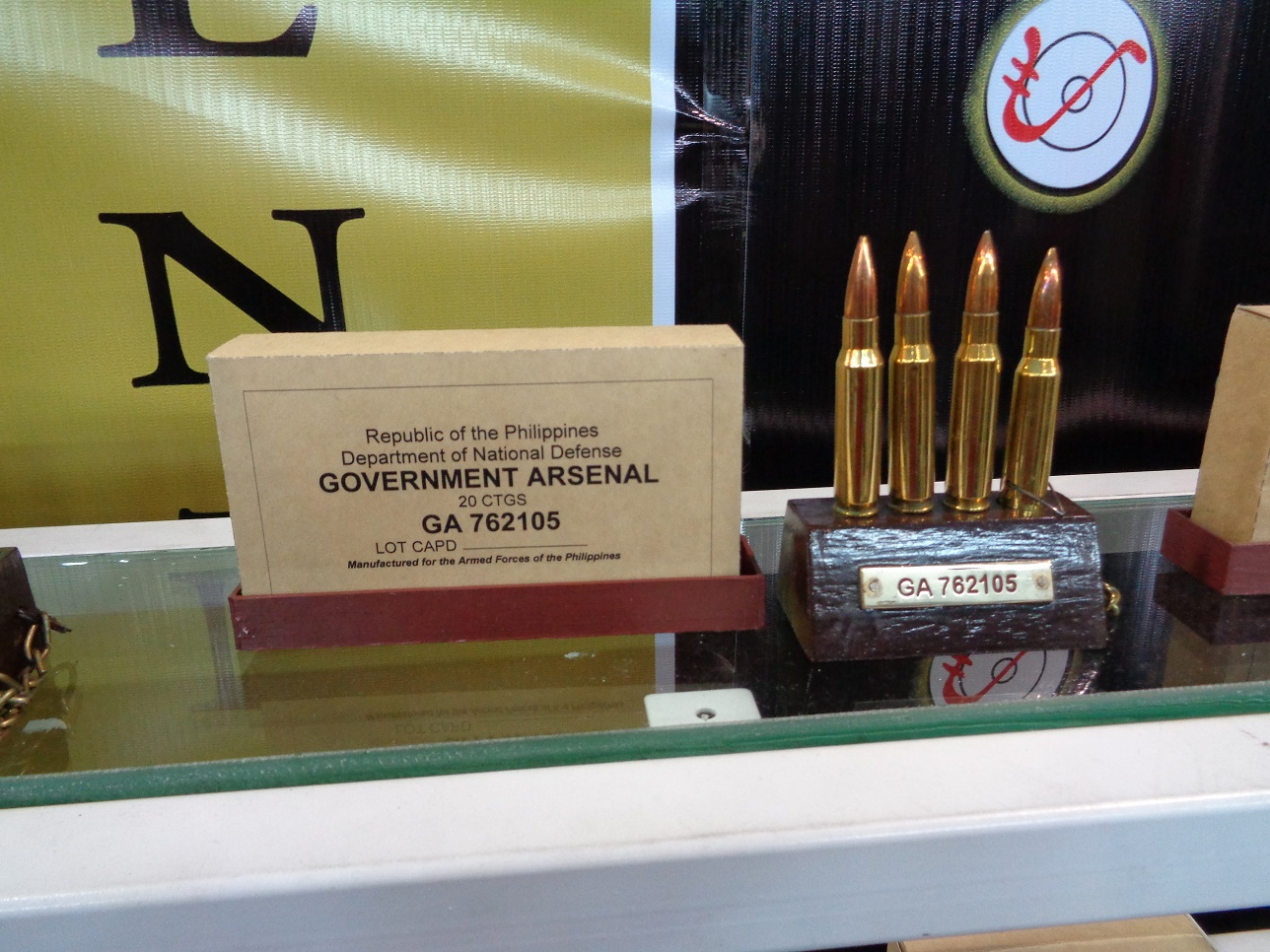
7.62×51mm NATO Ball (M80A)

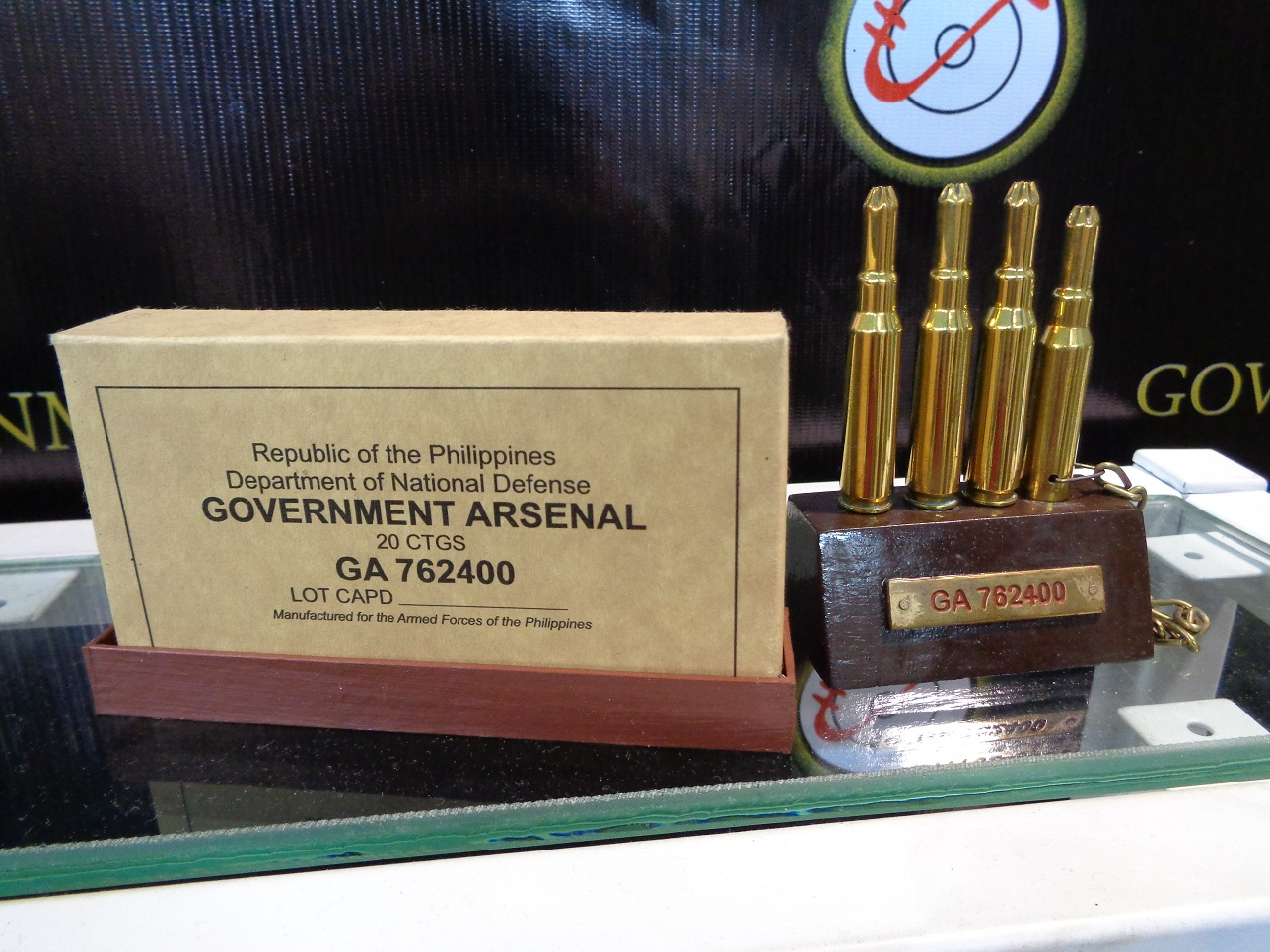
7.62×51mm NATO Blank

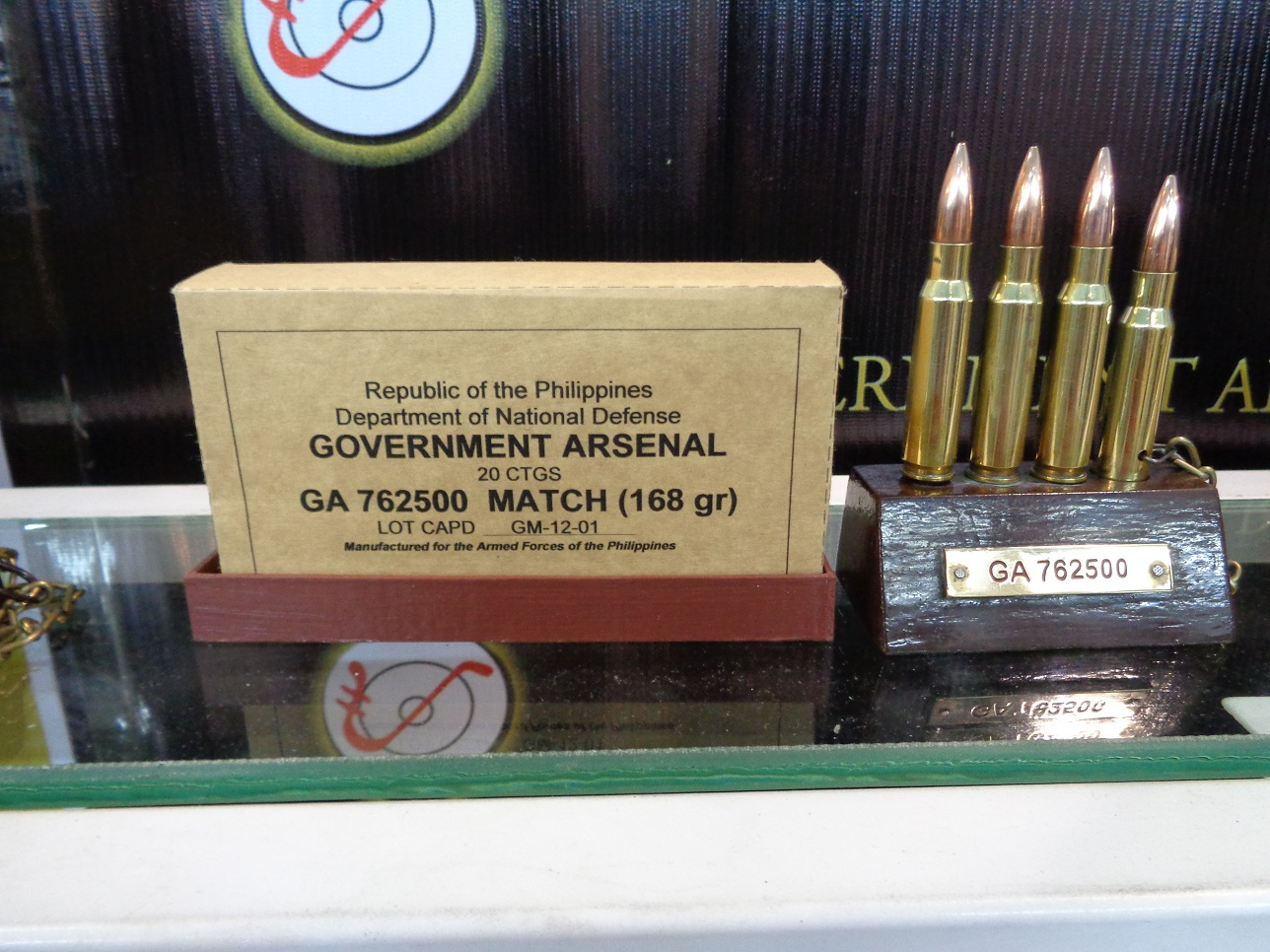
7.62×51mm NATO Match (168 gr)

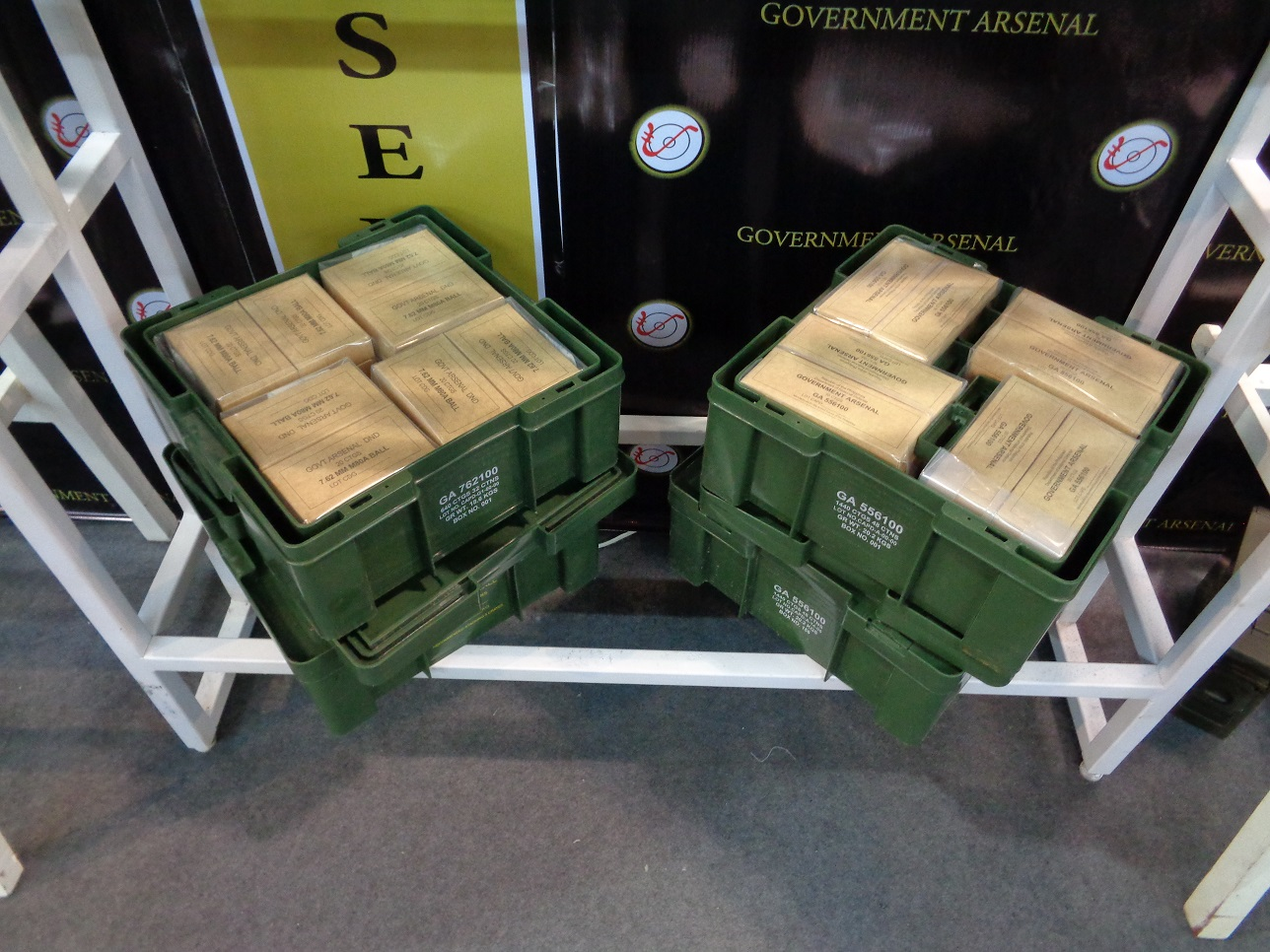
HDPE ammunition crates

== See also ==
- GA 10" Personal Defense Weapon (PDW)
- 7.62×37mm Musang
- Marine Scout Sniper Rifle
