= Bukit Kepong incident =

1950 siege, part of the Malayan Emergency

Coordinates: 2°20′47.9″N 102°49′49.5″E

Bukit Kepong Incident
- Part of the Malayan Emergency
- Bukit Kepong incident (Peninsular Malaysia) Bukit Kepong incident (Johor)
Date	23 February 1950
Location	Bukit Kepong, Muar District, Johor, Malaya
Result	Malayan government victory; Communist insurgents succeeded in defeating the police in Bukit Kepong but suffered heavy losses; Execution of Mat Indera on 30 January 1953

Belligerents
Federation of Malaya; Federation of Malaya Police	MCP; MNLA; 10th Regiment

Commanders and leaders
Sgt. Jamil Mohd Shah † (Bukit Kepong police chief); Ali Mustapha (Chief of Bukit Kepong village)	Mat Indera (executed); Lek Tuan

Strength
25 Police officers	180 Insurgents

Casualties and losses
14 officers killed 5 auxiliary police killed 4 officers wounded	40 killed
- Civilian casualties; 2 killed

The Bukit Kepong incident (Malay: Peristiwa Bukit Kepong) was an armed encounter in 1950 during the Malayan Emergency between the Federation of Malaya Police and the guerrillas of the Malayan National Liberation Army (MNLA), the paramilitary wing of the Malayan Communist Party (MCP). This conflict took place in an area surrounding the Bukit Kepong police station in Bukit Kepong, about 59 kilometres (37 mi) from Muar town, Johor. The wooden station was located on the south banks of the Muar River.

== Chronology ==
The incident started just before dawn with the Communist gunmen launching a guerrilla assault on the police station leading to the deaths of almost all of the police officers stationed there. When they began the siege, the attackers strongly believed that they would be able to defeat the policemen and gain control of the police station within a short span of time. This was due to several factors in their favour: their arms and numerical superiority and the relative isolation of the station. The battle began at about 4:15 am.

According to eyewitness accounts, there were about 180 Communists attacking, led by Muhammad Indera, a Malay Communist. Despite the odds, the policemen led by Sgt. Jamil Mohd Shah, refused to surrender, although numerous calls by the communists for them to lay down arms were made. Several officers were killed as the shooting continued and two wives of the defending officers took up arms when they discovered that their husbands fell in battle.

In the final hours of the fierce battle, the Communists set fire to the officers' barracks and station. Two women and their children were burnt to death in the married quarters. At that point, only three policemen plus a village guard were still alive. They rushed out from the burning station, unable to withstand the heat. They then assaulted the communists, killing at least three of them.

Only about five hours after the first shot was fired did the communists manage to break their defences and set the place ablaze. They then retreated into the jungle.

Fourteen policemen, two civilians, five auxiliary policemen, the wife of Abu Bakar Daud (one of the surviving policemen), the wife of Abu Mohd Ali and two of their children were killed in the incident.

== Reinforcements from nearby villages ==
During the attack, reinforcement were sent from Kampung Tui as the battle reverberated throughout several of the nearby villages. A band of villagers led by the village chief Ali Mustafa from Kampung Tui was escorted by 13 Auxiliary policemen. They were ambushed by the communists en route about half a kilometre away from the station. The villagers were outgunned by the Communists who were using automatic weapons as opposed to rifles and shotguns held by the villagers. Several village guards were wounded and two more auxiliary police officers killed. Although stopped halfway, their presence relieved some pressure of the Bukit Kepong defenders and forced a general Communist retreat.

Due to the lopsided situation, Ali Mustafa ordered his guards to retreat while the rest were asked to defend the perimeter around Bukit Kepong town. The Communists eventually retreated after setting fire to the village office and robbing a few stores.

At the same time, another village guard group came from Kampung Durian Chondong using a sampan heading towards Bukit Kepong to render aid. They arrived there at 10 a.m. and that was when the first news of the attack on Bukit Kepong police station was communicated.

== Aftermath ==
When the village guards entered the village, they were able to observe the aftermath of the attack. The village chief took command of the outpost until relieved by a police team from Muar. The battle at Bukit Kepong is considered to be tragic defeat although it strengthened the Government and people's resolve to fight the Communist insurgency. A small force defending against overwhelming odds gave the war against Communist insurgency a massive boost in terms of morale. Some drew comparisons between the Bukit Kepong incident and the Alamo, where the Bukit Kepong policemen, similar to the Texans, came under overwhelming odds and fought to the last man.

=== List of killed in action (KIA) ===
==== Policeman ====
1. Sergeant 3493 Jamil Bin Mohd Shah (Bukit Kepong police chief)
2. Corporal 7068 Mohd Yassin Bin Haji Wahab
3. Lance Corporal 7168 Jidin Bin Omar
4. Police Constable (PC) 3933 Hamzah Bin Ahmad
5. PC 5674 Abu Bin Mohd Ali
6. PC 7493 Muhammad Bin Jaafar
7. PC 7862 Abu Kadir Bin Jusoh
8. PC 8600 Jaafar Bin Hassan
9. PC 9136 Hassan Bin Osman
10. Extra Police Constable (EPC) 3475 Mohd Tap Bin Lazim
11. EPC 3795 Jaafar Bin Arshad
12. Marine Constable (MPC) 60 Ibrahim Bin Adam
13. MPC 68 Awang Bin Ali
14. MPC 181 Basiron Bin Adam
15. MPC 37 Abu Bakar Bin Daud

==== Auxiliary Police (AP) ====
1. AP 1925 Ali Akop Bin Othman
2. AP 2127 Othman Bin Yahya
3. AP 2130 Samad Bin Yatim

==== Auxiliary Police (AP) were killed in action (KIA) outside police station ====
1. AP 1912 Mahmood Bin Saat
2. AP 2098 Redzuan Bin Alias

==== Non-combatants ====
1. Embong Lazim
2. Koh Ah Cheng

==== Police family members ====
1. Fatimah Binte Yaaba – wife of Marine Constable Abu Bakar Daud
2. Hassan Bin Abu Bakar – son of Marine Constable Abu Bakar Daud
3. Saadiah – wife of Constable Abu Mohd Ali
4. Simah Binte Abu – daughter of Constable Abu Mohd Ali
5. Arafah Binte Yusoff - wife of Marine Constable Ibrahim bin Adam

==== Malayan Communist Party ====
40 guerilla fighters (names unknown)

=== List of survivors ===
==== Policemen ====
1. PC 7645 Haji Yusoff Bin Rono (retired within rank of Sergeant, died on 14 April 2005)
2. PC 10533 Othman Bin Yusoff
3. EPC 3472 Ahmad Bin Khalid

Note: All officers are deceased

==== Police family members ====
1. Mariam Binte Ibrahim – widow of Constable Muhamad Jaafar
2. Zainun Binte Muhamad – daughter of Constable Muhamad Jaafar
3. Abu Samah Bin Muhammad – son of Constable Muhamad Jaafar
4. Zaleha Binte Muhamad – daughter of Constable Muhamad Jaafar
5. Jamilah Binte Abu Bakar – daughter of Marine Constable Abu Bakar Daud
6. Hussain Bin abu Bakar – son of Marine Constable Abu Bakar Daud
7. Fatimah Binte Abdul Manan @ Timah Lawa – widow of Constable Hassan Osman
8. Pon Binte Khalid – widow of Marine Constable Awang Ali
9. Fatimah Binte Tuani – widow of Constable Hamzah Ahmad
10. Edmund Ross Williams Hunt – an Orang Asli mountain guide

== In popular culture ==
=== Film and novelization ===
Bukit Kepong was a 1981 action film chronicling the events of the conflict; produced and directed by Jins Shamsuddin, who also portrays Sergeant Jamil Mohd Shah.

The Bukit Kepong novel, written by Ismail Johari (who had also screenwrote the 1981 film) was published by Dewan Bahasa dan Pustaka (DBP) in 1990. It was adopted as the Form 4 secondary school and Sijil Pelajaran Malaysia (SPM) literature component (Komsas, Malay: Komponen Sastera) teaching material.

=== Controversial statement on Bukit Kepong by PAS Deputy President ===
On 21 August 2011, Mohamad Sabu, then Deputy President of Pan-Malaysian Islamic Party (PAS), now President of Parti Amanah Negara (AMANAH), made a controversial statement saying that Mat Indera, the leader of the communists during the Bukit Kepong Incident, was a national hero for fighting against British rule.

== See also ==
- Last stand
- History of the Royal Malaysia Police
- Battle of the Alamo

== Notes ==
- Adapted from novel Bukit Kepong by Ismail Johari
