= Jins Shamsuddin =

Malaysian actor and director (1935–2017)

Yang Berbahagia Tan Sri Datuk Jins Shamsuddin PSM PJN DPMP JSM KMN AMN AMP
- جينس شمس الدين
- Born: Mohamed Zain bin Shamsuddin; 5 November 1935; Taiping, Perak, British Malaya (now Malaysia)
- Died: 1 March 2017 (aged 81); Kuala Lumpur, Malaysia
- Resting place: Al-Ridzuan Mosque, Hulu Kelang Muslim Cemetery, Selangor
- Education: Sekolah Melayu Bendang Siam; King Edward VII School; London Film School; Universiti Sains Malaysia; Universiti Utara Malaysia
- Occupations: Actor; director; politician; art activists; writer; producer
- Years active: 1956–2011
- Known for: Jefri Zain in: Gerak Kilat; Bayangan Ajal; Jurang Bahaya
- Political party: United Malays National Organisation (UMNO)
- Spouses: Rahmah Rahmat (m. 1961; div. 1963) Puan Sri Halijah Abdullah (m. 1986–2017)
- Children: 3

Jins Shamsuddin

Senator Appointed by the Yang di-Pertuan Agong
- In office 12 February 2008 – 11 February 2011
- Monarch: Mizan Zainal Abidin
- Prime Minister: Abdullah Ahmad Badawi (2008–2009); Najib Razak (2009–2011)
- In office 13 October 2004 – 12 October 2007
- Monarchs: Sirajuddin (2004–2006); Mizan Zainal Abidin (2006–2007)
- Prime Minister: Abdullah Ahmad Badawi

Mohamed Zain "Jins" Shamsuddin (Jawi: محمد زين بن شمس الدين) (5 November 1935 – 1 March 2017) was a Malaysian film actor, director, politician, writer and producer.

== Early life and film career ==
Mohamed Jins was born in Taiping, Perak on 5 November 1935. He went to SMK King Edward VII Taiping, Perak and he completed his Senior Cambridge exams in 1956, hoping to continue his studies at the University of Malaya in Singapore (currently the National University of Singapore). His hopes were dashed when the university's admission officer said that they would "keep his application in view". His great-uncle, who was a teacher at the prestigious Anderson School in Ipoh, however managed to apply for a place to study electrical engineering in England three months into the deadline. Jins would use this spare time to take nightly English courses while he stayed with a relative who was the director for Radio Malaysia's education wing.

Meanwhile, there were rehearsals of a play that were going on nearby, in which Jins would watch them daily. The lead actor of the play would later choose him as his stand-in, with the blessings of the cast and crew, when it was learnt that the lead's mother fell ill and the lead had to attend to her. When the lead actor's mother died and he could not resume his role, Jins's stand-in became permanent. The play would eventually open at the Victoria Memorial Hall in Singapore. This is where he would be discovered by a Shaw Brothers public relations officer, who approached him about wanting to act in a movie. He agreed, and thus made his screen debut in Keluarga Tolol in 1956. He went on to act in several films until eventually becoming a main star in 1957 through Pancha Delima, a film directed by P. Ramlee.

=== Rising popularity and other ventures ===
From 1966 to 1968, Jins had starred in several action movies produced by Malay Film Production where he portrays Jefri Zain, a James Bond-like spy character.

He had pursued his studies in the London Film School from 1970 to 1972, obtaining his Diploma in Motion Picture Technology and graduating with first class honours.

In 1981, Jins collaborated with the Royal Malaysia Police to produce and direct Bukit Kepong; a film dramatizing the Bukit Kepong incident, which was a chaotic armed conflict between the Malayan police and Malayan Communist Party gunmen during the Malayan Emergency. The movie, which costed about RM1.3 million to make and collected RM1.7 million at the box-office, won eight awards in the 3rd Malaysia Film Festival the next year including the Best Film category. The film eventually went under a restoration project by KRU Studios in 2014.

For much of his life, Jins was interested in making a film about the events that led to the assassination of the British official J.W.W. Birch in Perak in 1875. A newspaper report indicated that he had begun work on such a film in 1992, but it was not completed. In 2004, Jins announced plans to make an epic English-language film entitled The King of the River: Pasir Salak, though the project was ultimately never realized. Even five years later in 2009, Jins expressed his eagerness for the project that he considered his lifelong ambition, saying "I hope to complete my movie on the historical events that happened in Pasir Salak before I die."

== Political career ==
On 13 October 2004, he became the first actor-politician in Malaysia following his appointment as a member of the Dewan Negara in the 11th Parliament of Malaysia. He was reappointed again as a Senator for a second term from 12 February 2008 until 11 February 2011.

== Personal life ==
Jins was first married to actress Rahmah Rahmat in Singapore in 1961, from which their marriage bore a son named Jeffry Jins. Their marriage however was short-lived, eventually divorcing in 1963. In 1986, he married Halijah Abdullah. They had two children together, Putera Hang Jebat and Putera Hang Nadim.

== Death ==
Jins died at 5:45 pm at a clinic in Taman Melawati after choking on cekodok on Wednesday, 1 March 2017 at the age of 81, as confirmed by his second son Putera Hang Nadim.

== Honours and awards ==
- Malaysia
  - Commander of the Order of Loyalty to the Crown of Malaysia (PSM) – Tan Sri (2007)
  - Commander of the Order of Meritorious Service (PJN) – Datuk (2004)
  - Companion of the Order of Loyalty to the Crown of Malaysia (JSM) (1993)
  - Officer of the Order of the Defender of the Realm (KMN) (1990)
  - Member of the Order of the Defender of the Realm (AMN) (1986)
- Perak
  - Knight Commander of the Order of the Perak State Crown (DPMP) – Dato' (1990)
  - Member of the Order of the Perak State Crown (AMP) (1980)

=== Awards ===
- Silver Crane Award at the Asia-Pacific Film Festival (1987)
- Honorary Master of Letters by Universiti Sains Malaysia (1999)
- The Veteran Artist Award at the Anugerah Bintang Popular (2004)
- Anugerah Seniman Negara (2009)

== Filmography ==
=== Film ===
| Year | Title | Role | Notes |
|---|---|---|---|
| 1956 | Keluarga Tolol | | Extra character |
| 1956 | Keadilan Illahi | Youth in a Country | Extra character |
| 1956 | Anak-ku Sazali | While at the Train Station | Extra character |
| 1957 | Pancha Delima | Suria Kencana | |
| 1957 | Kasih Sayang | | |
| 1958 | Matahari | Prebet Bujang | |
| 1958 | Azimat | | |
| 1958 | Sergeant Hassan | Aziz | |
| 1958 | Anak Pontianak | Petir | |
| 1959 | Dandan Setia | Tengku Dandan Setia | |
| 1959 | Samseng | Ahmad | |
| 1960 | Lela Manja | Megat Komeng | |
| 1960 | Megat Terawis | Megat Sari | |
| 1960 | Pertarongan | Tamir | |
| 1960 | Putera Sangkar Maut | | |
| 1961 | Si Tanggang | Tanggang | |
| 1961 | Indera Bangsawan | Indera Bangsawan | |
| 1962 | Lubalang Daik | Singkip | |
| 1962 | Batu Durhaka | Wira | |
| 1963 | Darah Muda | Yazid | |
| 1963 | Neracha | Rahman / Hussein | |
| 1963 | Budi dan Dosa | Osman | |
| 1965 | Bidasari | Tengku Indera | |
| 1965 | Takdir | Panglima Meranti | |
| 1965 | Sayang Si Buta | Dr. Rashid | |
| 1966 | Gerak Kilat | Jefri Zain | |
| 1966 | Kacha Permata | Hamzah / Omar | |
| 1968 | Bayangan Ajal | Jefri Zain | |
| 1968 | Jurang Bahaya | Jefri Zain | |
| 1968 | Amok Tok Nading | | |
| 1968 | Kanchan Tirana | Kanchan | |
| 1968 | Miang-Miang Keladi | Khalid | |
| 1969 | Bukan Salah Ibu Mengandong | Agus | Directing debut |
| 1970 | Di-Belakang Tabir | Osman / Karim | As director |
| 1977 | Menanti Hari Esok | Cikgu Talib / Jalil | As director and writer |
| 1979 | Esok Masih Ada | ASP Zamri | As director and producer |
| 1979 | Tiada Esok Bagimu | Ghailan | As director and producer |
| 1981 | Bukit Kepong | Sgt. Jamil Mohd Shah | As director and producer |
| 1982 | Esok Untuk Siapa | Jiman | As director, writer and producer |
| 1985 | Ali Setan | Tan Sri | As director |
| 1991 | Memory | Herman | |
| 1993 | Balada | Father Desa | As director |
| 1998 | Money No Enough | Rich Man | Cameo |
| 2001 | The Deadly Disciple | Mahaguru Yassin | Cameo |
| 2007 | 1957: Hati Malaya | Sultan Johor | Cameo |
| 2008 | Akhirat | Dato’ Shamsudin | |
| 2010 | Miss You like Crazy | Mir's Grandfather | A Filipino production |

=== Television series ===
| Year | Title | Role | TV channel | Notes |
|---|---|---|---|---|
| 1993 | Roda Roda Kotaraya | Supt Rahman | TV1 | |
| 2004–2005 | Masih Ada Cinta | Zahran | TV3 | |
| 2005 | Mahligai Gading | Tan Sri Suffian | TV1 | |
| 2007 | Dinasti Bilut | Tan Sri Mustafa | TV1 | |
| 2008 | Roda-Roda Kuala Lumpur (Season 2) | | TV2 | Special appearance |
| 2011 | Tahajjud Cinta | Tan Sri | TV3 | |

=== Telemovie ===
| Year | Title | Role | TV channel | Notes |
|---|---|---|---|---|
| 1991 | Wawasan | | TV1 | |
| 1993 | Ianya.... Anugerah | | TV3 | As director |

== Bibliography ==
- Jins Shamsuddin: Kembara Seorang Seniman (Jins Shamsuddin: Adventures of the Artists). Mohd Zamberi A. Malek. Finas. 2007. ISBN 978-983-99423-9-2 (ISBN 9789839942392)
