= Rahimah Rahim (singer, born 1992) =

Singaporean singer from Singapore (born 1992)

- Born: April 7, 1992 (age 33)
- Occupation: singer
- Spouse: single

Rahimah Rahim (born April 9, 1992) is a Singaporean singer from Singapore. She became known after her appearance on Singapore Idol, a TV singing competition modelled after the TV shows Pop Idol and American Idol. Singapore Idol is a production of MediaCorp TV, a television and radio production company in Singapore which also produces the news station, Channel NewsAsia.

== Singing career ==
During her appearances on Singapore Idol, she sang songs including 'Guji Guji Kemcho Saru che Haru che', 'Unwritten' by Natasha Bedingfield, 'Don't Speak' by No Doubt and 'Breakaway' by Kelly Clarkson. She was voted off the show on August 10, 2006, right before the theme of Rock The House. She was quoted as saying that she wanted 'very badly to sing in her mother tongue' and that 'they [the other contestants] were about to have Rock The House without the Rocker Chick' upon her departure. She left behind her signature glove as a memento to the other contestants.

She cites her favourite singers and bands as being Amy Lee from Evanescence, The Cranberries, Alanis Morissette, Michelle Branch, Kelly Clarkson, Shakira, Linkin Park, Scorpions, and Agnes Monica from Indonesia. She is known for her loud voice and freestyled hair, which she cuts herself.

Rahima pulled out from the last episode of "Wish Upon A Star", saying that she wished to spend more time in recording her solo album.

== Personal life ==
Rahima had her name changed slightly (with the extra "h" being removed) to avoid confusion between her and veteran singer Rahimah Rahim (who happens to be her distant aunt).

== Credits ==
- Singapore Idol
- Danielle (Suria TV)
