= A. Rahim =

Malaysian actor and director

- أ. رحيم
- Born: Abdul Rahim bin Abu; 19 May 1930; Kuala Kangsar, Perak, British Malaya (now Malaysia)
- Died: 20 April 1992 (aged 61); Kuala Lumpur, Malaysia
- Resting place: Pusara Aman, Singapore
- Occupations: Actor, director
- Years active: 1951–1992

Abdul Rahim Abu (Jawi: عبد الرحيم أبو) better known by her stage name A. Rahim, (19 May 1930 – 20 April 1992), was a Malaysian actor and director. Starting his entertainment career on the big screen during the golden age of Malay cinema, he was known for his antagonistic roles in films produced by Malay Film Productions, earning him the nickname 'Rahim Debuk'.

== Career ==
He mostly acted in Malay Film Productions films and also acted in Cathay-Keris Film Productions films (Rumah Itu Dunia Aku and Chuchu Datok Merah). On average, he played a lot of antagonistic roles – only three times he played protagonistic roles such as in the film Isi Neraka, Ibu Mertua-ku and Anak Buloh Betong as well as a comedic roles in the film Ali Baba Bujang Lapok when he played Momotaro-san, one of the 40 rogues of Japanese-Muslim descent and that's how his name began to be recognized.

Aside from acting, he is also a martial arts expert and is also a teacher for fighting scenes to several actors, in line with artists Salleh Kamil and S. Kadarisman. One of them was Silat Kuntau Tekpi and Tekpi knife skills where he was trained by guru Zainal Abidin Baling.

After the end of the Malay film era in Singapore, he returned to Malaysia and continued to act in several more films, such as Pendekar, Tiada Esok Bagimu, Esok Masih Ada, Bukit Kepong and others. In addition, he was also active in dramas produced by RTM.

Two days prior to his death, he was reported to have joked by telling JD Production's founder and producer, the late Julie Dahlan that his film Kanang Anak Langkau might not be watched by him.

== Personal life ==
He was born as Abdul Rahim bin Abu on May 19, 1930, in Kuala Kangsar, Perak and was a former biras of P. Ramlee as he had been married to Junainah (Junaidah's sister, P. Ramlee's first wife).

== Death ==
He died on Monday, April 20, 1992, in his van in the compound of Studio Merdeka, due to heart disease at the age of 61, a months prior to what would have been his 62nd birthday. His remains were buried at Pusara Aman, Singapore and it was his last wish.
