= Muhammad Indera =

Malay communist leader

Muhammad bin Indera (c. 1920 – 30 January 1953), nicknamed Ahmad and widely known as Mat Indera, was a Malay communist leader during the Malayan Emergency, and was a member of Malayan Communist Party. He was a Muslim religious teacher ('ulama') before the Occupation of Japan in Malaya. He was renowned for leading 180 communists to launch a guerrilla assault on a police station during the Bukit Kepong Incident, causing deaths of almost all police officers in the station. Following the guerilla attack, the ruling British authorities placed a M$ 75,000 bounty on his head – a large sum of money at the time, equivalent to approximately RM500,000 in 2020 ringgit.

He was said to be one of the descendants of Datuk Bentara Husin Lela, a hero of Siak Sri Inderapura who was once Sultan Sharif's senior commander in Siak.

On the night of 14 October 1952, Mat Indera was invited to a "meeting" by some acquaintances in Kampung Seri Medan, at which he was served tempeh and coffee laced with Datura. After being incapacitated, he was handed over to the British, who charged him with crimes related to the Bukit Kepong incident. Mat Indera was subsequently found guilty and hanged at 11 pm on 30 January 1953 in Taiping Prison.

== Controversial statement by PAS Deputy President ==
On 21 August 2011, Mohamad Sabu, Deputy President of PAS, made a controversial statement saying that Mat Indera, the leader of the communists during the Bukit Kepong Incident, was a national hero for fighting against British rule.
