= 7.62×37mm Musang =

Assault rifle cartridge

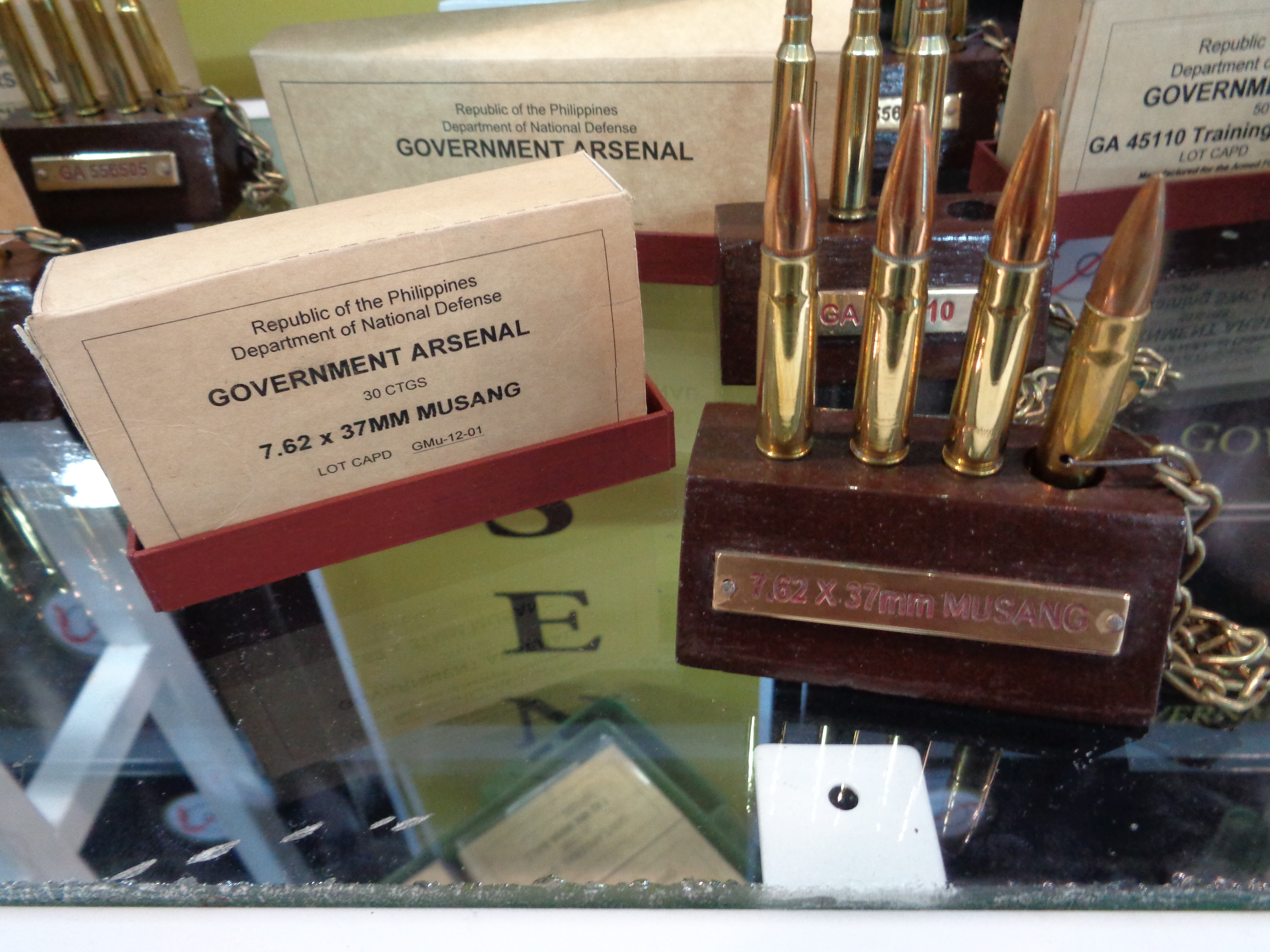
- 7.62×37mm Musang cartridges on display
- Place of origin: Philippines

Service history
- In service: Preproduction prototypes only
- Used by: Philippines

Production history
- Designer: Government Arsenal
- Manufacturer: Government Arsenal
- Produced: 2012

Specifications
- Parent case: 5.56×45mm NATO
- Case type: Rimless, bottleneck

The 7.62×37mm Musang (Note: Musang means wildcat in Tagalog.) is an assault rifle cartridge introduced in 2012 developed and manufactured in the Philippines by the Government Arsenal for use by the military in special operations and close quarter battle.

The 7.62×37mm Musang round is unrelated to the Soviet 7.62×39mm M43-round.

== Development ==
The new cartridge was developed based on previous lessons learned from the development of the Night Fighting Weapon System. It was intended to offer improved lethality over 9mm and 5.56mm rounds in subsonic loads for use in CQB and suppressed weapons with a range of 300 meters.

The Musang is a "Wildcat cartridge" inspired by the .300 Whisper concept and made from components already produced or procured by the Government Arsenal. It uses a 5.56×45mm NATO cartridge case, necked-up to accept a Cal .30M2 flat base bullet, a 7.62mm boat tail bullet, or a Sierra Match King bullet for an overall cartridge length equivalent to that of the 5.56×45mm NATO. The cartridge can be loaded for either subsonic or supersonic muzzle velocities.

Much like the 300 AAC Blackout, the Musang cartridge can be loaded into STANAG magazines (with 25 rounds able to fit into a standard 30-round M16 magazine) and requires only a barrel change to be used on an AR-15. The cartridge is used on the Government Arsenal's 10-inch barreled Musang PDW, which is based on the M4/M16 platform.

== See also ==
- 9×39mm
- .300 AAC Blackout
