= Saadiah (actress) =

Singaporean actress (1936–2005)

Datin Saadiah AMN
- السعدية
- Born: Satya binti Baharom; August 10, 1936; Tanjong Katong, Straits Settlements, (present-day Singapore)
- Died: February 26, 2005 (aged 68); Taman Melawati, Ulu Klang, Selangor, Malaysia
- Resting place: Taman Melawati Muslim Cemetery, Ulu Klang, Selangor
- Occupations: Actress, director
- Years active: 1950–1984
- Spouses: Atan Samad (m. 1954; div. 1961) Dato' Ahmad Daud (m. 1961; died 2003)
- Children: 6
- Relatives: Mariam Baharum (sister)

Satya Baharom known professionally as Saadiah (10 August 1936 – 26 February 2005) was a Malaysian actress and director, who was famous in the 1950s and 1960s during the golden era of the Malay films.

== Biography ==
Saadiah became interested in movies after taking her sister Mariam Baharum (Mariam Tahi Lalat) to Malay Film Productions to accompany her sister. One day, director B S Rajhans offered her the opportunity to lead a minor character in Rachun Dunia's film, starring Osman Gumanti, Kasma Booty, and P. Ramlee.

Saadiah participated in movies with P. Ramlee are Juwita, Anjoran Nasib, Sedarah, Penarek Becha, Hang Tuah, Semerah Padi, Sarjan Hassan, Musang Berjanggut and Antara Dua Darjat amongst others.

With the “Ceritaku Ceritamu” movie, Saadiah became the first Malay female director. However, it was her one and only directorial movies.

Her last movie was Matinya Seorang Patriot directed by Datuk Rahim Razali in 1984 with Eman Manan, Noor Kumalasari, Yusof Wahab and Zulkifli Zain.

== Personal life ==
Her health condition did not allow her to continue acting. She was married to Datuk Ahmad Daud and was a mother to Fauziah (also known as Ogy), Fazlina, and Faizal.

She died on February 26, 2005, at 69, diagnosed with diabetes.

== Filmography ==
In 1975, Saadiah acted with her husband and daughter Fauziah Ahmad Daud in the movie Permintaan Terakhir.

Year	Title	Role
1950	Rachun Dunia	
1950	Bakti	
1951	Juwita	Norsiah
1952	Yatim Piatu	Aminah
1952	Anjoran Nasib	Ramlah
1952	Sedarah	
1954	Iman	Hamimah
1955	Penarek Becha	Azizah
1956	Hang Tuah	Melor
1956	Semerah Padi	Dara
1957	Mogok	
1957	Kasih Sayang	
1958	Sarjan Hassan	Salmah
1959	Musang Berjanggut	Puspawangi
1959	Dandan Setia	Puteri Intan Terpilih
1960	Isi Neraka	Kesuma
1960	Antara Dua Darjat	Tengku Zaleha
1960	Putera Sangkar Maut	
1961	Indera Bangsawan	Tengku Ratna Saerah
1961	Mas Merah	Mas Merah
1963	Korban	
1964	Jeritan Batin	
1964	Dupa Cendana	Setanggi
1964	Melanchong Ka Tokyo	Rosnah
1964	Mambang Moden	Azlin
1965	Nora Zain - Agen Wanita 001	Nora Zain
1966	Anak Buloh Betong	Tengku Puteri Mayang Mas
1967	Lampong Karam	Hamidah
1968	Ibulah Syurga	
1969	Sial Wanita	Salmah
1971	Jahanam	Permaisuri
1975	Permintaan Terakhir	Dirinya sendiri - Saadiah
1979	Ceritaku Ceritamu	
1981	Sumpah Semerah Padi	Datin Tanjung Kesuma
1984	Matinya Seorang Patriot	Hajah
