= Kuala Lumpur City Hall =

Malaysian city council

Coordinates: 3°9′8.8″N 101°41′39.0″E

- Dewan Bandaraya Kuala Lumpur

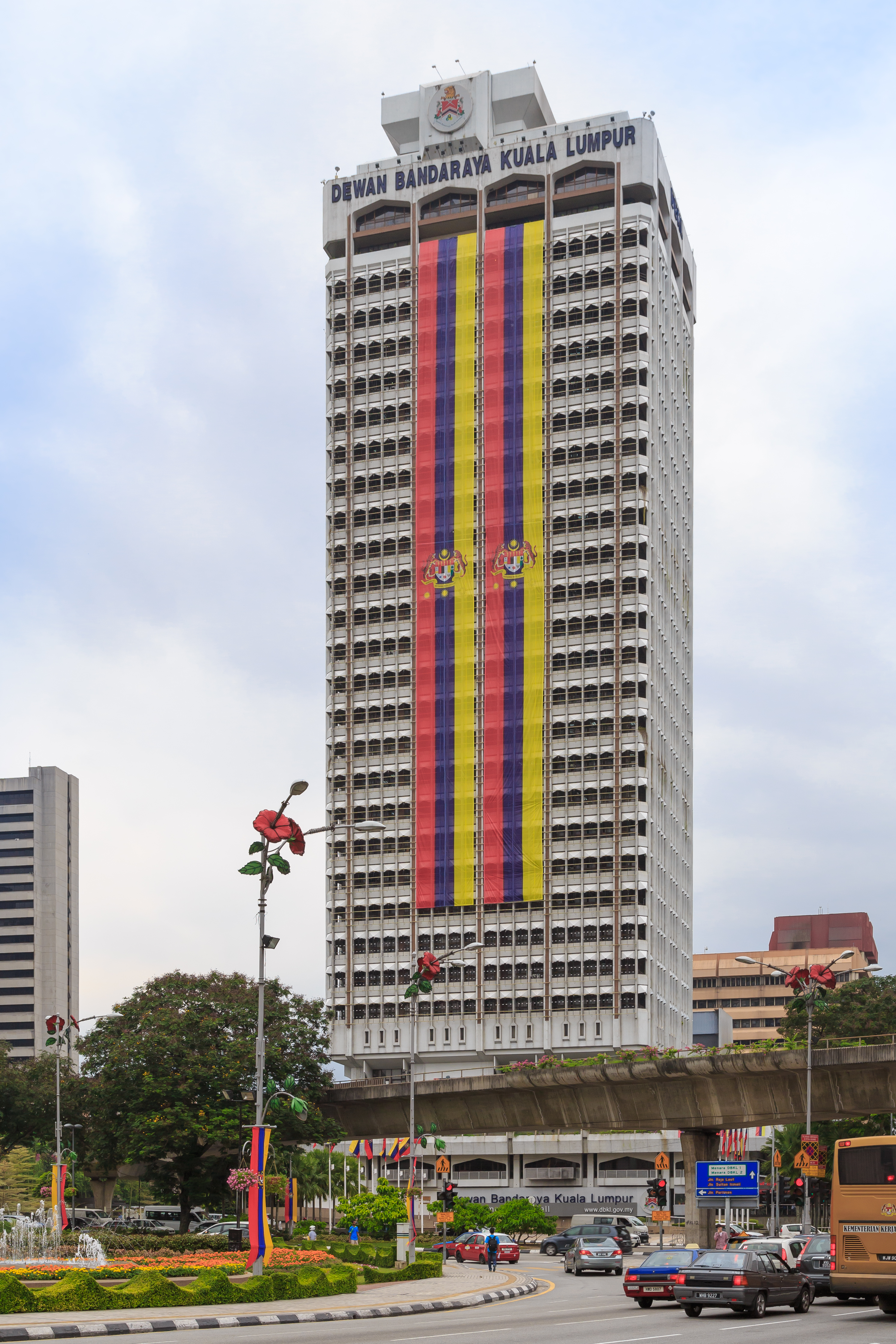
- DBKL Tower, the administrative offices of the DBKL.

Agency overview
- Formed: 1 February 1972; 54 years ago
- Preceding agencies: Federal Capital Commission (1961-1972); Kuala Lumpur Municipal Council (1952-1961); Kuala Lumpur Municipal Commission (1948-1952); Kuala Lumpur Town Board (1946-1948); Kuala Lumpur Sanitary Board (1890-1943)
- Jurisdiction: City of Kuala Lumpur
- Headquarters: Menara DBKL 1, Jalan Raja Laut, 50350 Kuala Lumpur, Malaysia
- Motto: Ready to Contribute towards an Excellent City (Bersedia Menyumbang Bandaraya Cemerlang)
- Annual budget: MYR 2.905 billion (2018)
- Agency executive: Fadlun Mak Ujud, Mayor
- Website: www.dbkl.gov.my/en/

The Kuala Lumpur City Hall (Malay: Dewan Bandaraya Kuala Lumpur, abbreviated DBKL or KLCH) is the city council which administers the city of Kuala Lumpur in Malaysia. This council was established after the city was officially granted city status on 1 February 1972. Their jurisdiction covers an area of 243 square kilometres.

The council consists of the mayor plus fifteen members of the city advisory board appointed to serve a one-year term by the Minister of Federal Territories. The current mayor of Kuala Lumpur is Fadlun Mak Ujud, who has been in office since 15 November 2025.

== History ==
The first local government established for Kuala Lumpur was the Kuala Lumpur Sanitary Board (Malay: Lembaga Kebersehan Kuala Lumpur), which was formed on 14 May 1890 and was tasked with the responsibilities of cleaning, street lighting, regulations of markets, whitewashing of houses, streets construction and maintenance, jungle clearing, building drains, and erecting sign posts.

When the town fell under Japanese occupation in 1942 during World War II, the board was abolished by the Japanese in June 1943 and replaced by a group of military and civilian personnels responsible for town services. After the war, the British Military Administration revived the local authority as the Kuala Lumpur Town Board on 1 April 1946.

Two years later on 15 March 1948, the town board was replaced by the Kuala Lumpur Municipal Commission and Kuala Lumpur became the first municipality in the Malay states. On 1 May 1951, the Selangor State Council approved a constitution for the municipality to establish it as the Kuala Lumpur Municipal Council, which would consist of 12 elected and 6 appointed members. The first municipal election was held in four three-member wards (Bungsar, Sentul, Imbi and Petaling) on 16 February 1952, and the first meeting of the council was convened three days later on 19 February.

During British colonial times and early independence, Kuala Lumpur had been the capital of the country as well as the state of Selangor.

On 1 April 1961, with the commencement of the Federal Capital Act 1960, local elections in Kuala Lumpur was abolished and the municipality was put under a federally controlled corporation sole called the "Commissioner of the Federal Capital of Kuala Lumpur", more commonly known as the Federal Capital Commission. It was headed by a Commissioner, and assisted by an advisory board.

Kuala Lumpur later achieved city status on 1 February 1972, becoming the first settlement in Malaysia to be granted such status after Malaya's independence in 1957, and the second city in Malaysia after George Town. Consequently, the local authority was renamed as the Kuala Lumpur City Hall (Malay: Dewan Bandaraya Kuala Lumpur). Later, on 1 February 1974, Kuala Lumpur became a Federal Territory, thereby separating it from the state of Selangor. Kuala Lumpur ceased to be the capital of Selangor in 1978 after the city of Shah Alam was declared as the new state capital.

After Kuala Lumpur gaining its city status in 1972, the city's executive head was renamed as the "Commissioner of the City of Kuala Lumpur" (Malay: Datuk Bandar Kuala Lumpur) under the City of Kuala Lumpur Act 1971, also commonly known as the Mayor of Kuala Lumpur in English.

Executive power lies with the mayor in the city hall, who is appointed for three years by the Minister of Federal Territories. This system of appointing the mayor and councillor has been in place ever since the local government elections were suspended in 1970.

On 14 May 1990, Kuala Lumpur celebrated 100 years of local council. The new Federal Territory of Kuala Lumpur flag and anthem were introduced. Kuala Lumpur City Hall launched its own coat of arms on 31 January 1992, which is a modification of the coat of arms of the former municipal council. It incorporated the city's emblem in use since Kuala Lumpur became a city.

=== Appointed mayors of Kuala Lumpur ===
Since 1972, the city has been led by fifteen mayors. The previous mayors are listed as below:

No.	Mayor	Term start	Term end
1.	Lokman Yusof	1 February 1972	15 May 1972
2.	Yaacob Abdul Latiff	16 May 1972	30 November 1980
3.	Elyas Omar	1 December 1980	16 November 1992
4.	Mazlan Ahmad	17 November 1992	14 December 1995
5.	Kamaruzzaman Shariff	14 December 1995	12 December 2001
6.	Mohmad Shaid Mohd Taufek	14 December 2001	12 December 2003
7.	Ruslin Hasan	14 December 2003	12 December 2005
8.	Ab. Hakim Borhan	14 December 2005	12 December 2007
9.	Ahmad Fuad Ismail	14 December 2007	16 July 2013
10.	Ahmad Phesal Talib	18 July 2013	16 July 2015
11.	Mhd Amin Nordin Abdul Aziz	17 July 2015	30 September 2018
12.	Nor Hisham Ahmad Dahlan	2 October 2018	1 October 2020
13.	Mahadi Che Ngah	1 October 2020	31 March 2023
14.	Kamarulzaman Mat Salleh	17 April 2023	14 August 2024
15.	Maimunah Mohd Sharif	15 August 2024	14 November 2025
16.	Fadlun Mak Ujud	15 November 2025	Incumbent

== Current composition ==
=== Top management ===
As of 4 February 2026, the top management of the City Hall consists of:

1. Fadlun Mak Ujud, Mayor
2. Rosli bin Nordin, executive director (Planning)
3. Ismadi bin Sakirin, executive director (Socio-Economic Development)
4. Shamsul Joehari bin Zainal Mokhtar, executive director (Project Management)
5. Nor Azlina binti Mohd Saad, executive director (Management)

=== City advisory board ===
The city advisory board makes recommendations on the City Hall's strategic policy and priorities, governance policy and structure, financial planning and budgeting, fiscal policy including revenue and tax policies, intergovernmental and international relations, City Hall and its operations, and human resources and labour relations.

As of August 2024, the composition of the advisory board is as follows:

Post	Name	Political Parties
Chairman	Maimunah Mohd Sharif	Independent
Member	Mohd Shafei Abdullah	BN-UMNO
Member	Izudin bin Ishak	BN-UMNO
Member	Noridah binti Abdul Rahim	Independent
Member	Tong Nguen Khoong	Independent
Member	Ismail bin Ngah	Independent
Member	Afdlin Shauki Aksan	PH-PKR
Member	Abdul Basir bin V Kunhimohamed	PH-PKR
Member	Hayatul Kamil bin Termudi	PH-AMANAH
Member	Jayakumar A/L R. Muniandy	PH-PKR
Member	Leong Ooi Kuan	PH-DAP
Member	Lai Chen Heng	PH-PKR

=== Departments ===
Sectors	Departments
Management	1. Finance Department; 2. Human Resource Management Department; 3. Administration Department; 4. Information Management Department; 5. Property Management and Valuation Department
Socio-Economic Development	1. Enforcement Department; 2. Housing Management and Community Development Department; 3. Licensing and Petty Traders Development Department; 4. Health and Environment Department; 5. Culture, Arts and Sports Department
Project Management	1. Project Implementation and Building Maintenance Department; 2. Civil Engineering and Urban Transportation Department; 3. Mechanical and Electrical Engineering Department; 4. Landscape and Recreation Development Department; 5. Quantity Surveying Department
Planning	1. City Planning Department; 2. Infrastructure Planning Department; 3. Economic Planning and Development Department; 4. Building Control Department
Other Departments	1. Legal and Prosecution Department; 2. Corporate Planning Department; 3. Internal Audit Department; 4. Integrity Department

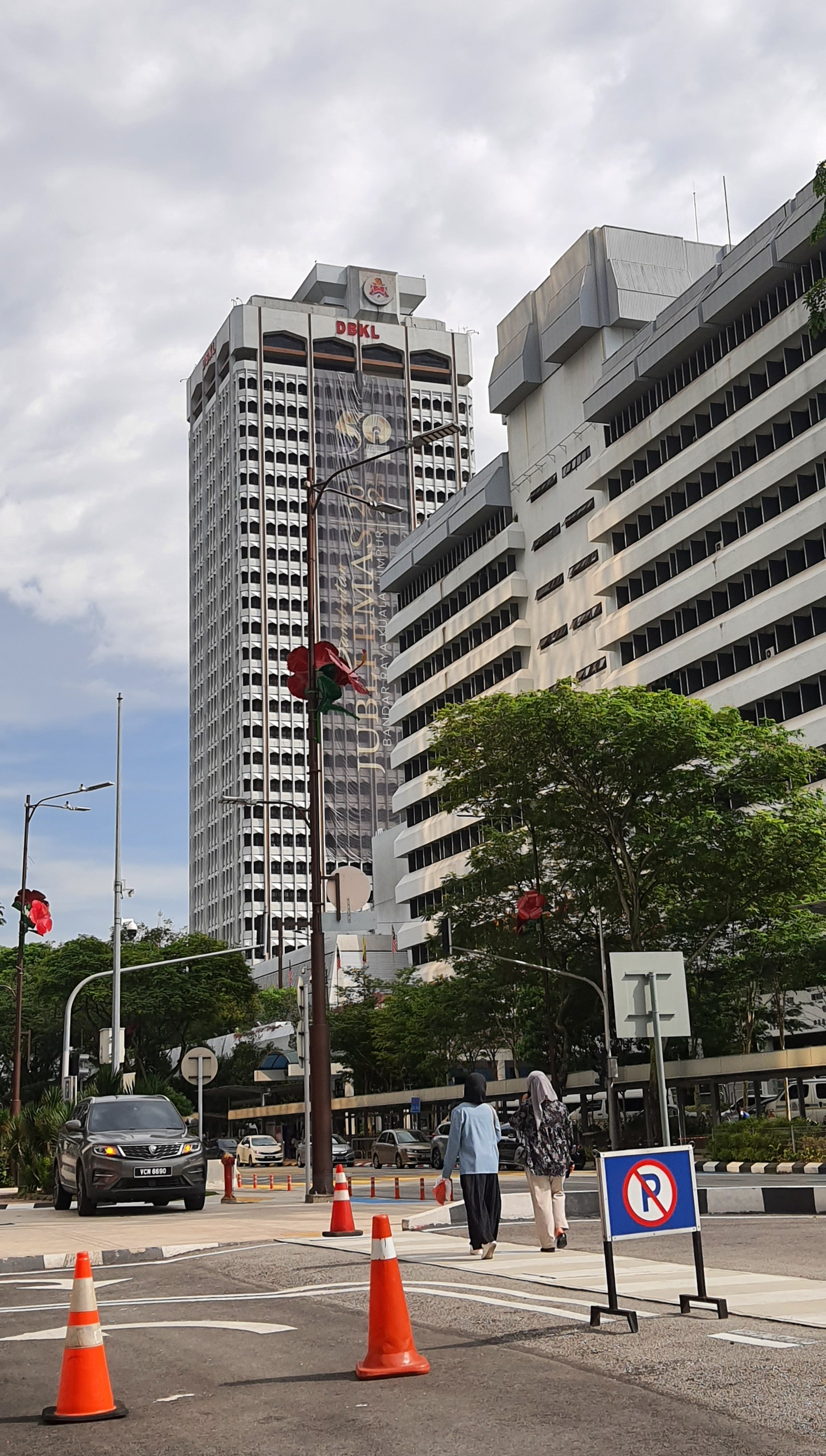
DBKL headquarters in Kuala Lumpur, located along Jalan Raja Laut.

=== Branch office ===
- Bandar Tun Razak
- Batu
- Bukit Bintang
- Cheras
- Kepong
- Lembah Pantai
- Segambut
- Seputeh
- Setiawangsa
- Titiwangsa
- Wangsa Maju

== List of legislations ==
As of 4 February 2026, the city is governed by the following legislations:

No.	Acts	Subsidiary Legislations	
1.	Federal Capital Act 1960	(1)	Kuala Lumpur City Advisory Board Regulations 1989
1.	Federal Capital Act 1960	(2)	Federal Capital (City Area) Order 1974
2.	Local Government Act 1976	(1)	Fee Payable for Late Payment of Assessment Rates
2.	Local Government Act 1976	(2)	Fees for Warrant of Attachment
2.	Local Government Act 1976	(3)	Kuala Lumpur Municipal (Cattle) By-laws 1968
2.	Local Government Act 1976	(4)	Food Handlers (FT) By-laws 1979
2.	Local Government Act 1976	(5)	Swimming Pool (FT) By-laws 1981
2.	Local Government Act 1976	(6)	Refuse Collection, Removal and Disposal (FT) By-laws 1981
2.	Local Government Act 1976	(7)	Notification of Fee for Disposal of Refuse in Dumping Ground
2.	Local Government Act 1976	(8)	Advertisements (FT) By-laws 1982
2.	Local Government Act 1976	(9)	Licensing of Private Car Parks (FT) By-laws 1982
2.	Local Government Act 1976	(10)	Declaration under Section 81 (k)
2.	Local Government Act 1976	(11)	Local Government (Compounding Offences) (FTKL) By-laws 1986
2.	Local Government Act 1976	(12)	Public Lavatories (FTKL) By-laws 1986
2.	Local Government Act 1976	(13).	Public Lavatories (FTKL) By-laws 2007 - Charges for the use of Public Lavatories
2.	Local Government Act 1976	(14)	City Hall of Kuala Lumpur Officers (Conduct and Discipline) Rules 1989
2.	Local Government Act 1976	(15)	Local Government (Election Advertisement) (FTKL) By-laws 1990
2.	Local Government Act 1976	(16)	Licensing of Dogs and Kennel Establishments (FTKL) By-laws 1991
2.	Local Government Act 1976	(17)	Vandalism (FTKL) By-laws 1991
2.	Local Government Act 1976	(18)	City Hall of Kuala Lumpur Enforcement Officers (Conduct and Discipline) Rules 1992
2.	Local Government Act 1976	(19)	Local Government (Dataran Merdeka) (FTKL) By-laws 1992
2.	Local Government Act 1976	(20)	Transportation of Materials (FTKL) By-laws 1997
2.	Local Government Act 1976	(21)	Public Housing (FTKL) By-laws 2000
2.	Local Government Act 1976	(22)	Wholesale Markets (FTKL) By-laws 2002
2.	Local Government Act 1976	(23)	Parks (FTKL) By-laws 2012
2.	Local Government Act 1976	(24)	Crematorium (FTKL) By-laws 2013
2.	Local Government Act 1976	(25)	Licensing of Trades, Businesses and Industries (FTKL) By-laws 2016
2.	Local Government Act 1976	(26)	Licensing of Markets (FTKL) By-laws 2016
2.	Local Government Act 1976	(27)	Licensing of Hawkers (FTKL) By-laws 2016
2.	Local Government Act 1976	(28)	Licensing of Food Establishments (FTKL) By-laws 2016
2.	Local Government Act 1976	(29)	Prohibition Against Spitting (FTKL) By-laws 2017
3.	Street, Drainage and Building Act 1974	(1)	Earthworks (FTKL) By-laws 1988
3.	Street, Drainage and Building Act 1974	(2)	Building (FTKL) By-laws 1985
3.	Street, Drainage and Building Act 1974	(3)	Street, Drainage and Building (Compounding of Offences) (FTKL) 1985
3.	Street, Drainage and Building Act 1974	(4)	Street, Drainage and Building (Recovery of Arrears) (FTKL) 1990
3.	Street, Drainage and Building Act 1974	(5)	Declaration under Section 97 - Premises are liable to night inspection
4.	Federal Territory (Planning) Act 1982	(1)	Federal Territory (Planning) (Zoning and Density) Rules 1985
4.	Federal Territory (Planning) Act 1982	(2)	Exemption under Rule 14 Planning (Development) Rules 1970
4.	Federal Territory (Planning) Act 1982	(3)	Federal Territory (Planning) (Appeal Board) Rules 1997
4.	Federal Territory (Planning) Act 1982	(4)	Federal Territory (Planning) (Procedure for the Refund of Development Charges) Rules 2007
4.	Federal Territory (Planning) Act 1982	(5)	Federal Territory (Planning) (Development Charge) Rules 2013
4.	Federal Territory (Planning) Act 1982	(6)	Federal Territory (Planning) (Compounding of Offences) Rules 2015
4.	Federal Territory (Planning) Act 1982	(7)	Federal Territory (Planning) (Fee for Purchase of Structure Plan) Rules 2023
4.	Federal Territory (Planning) Act 1982	(8)	Notification of Approval of Draft Structure Plan for Federal Territory
4.	Federal Territory (Planning) Act 1982	(9)	Federal Territory (Planning) (Fee For Purchase Of Kuala Lumpur Local Plan 2040) Rules 2025
4.	Federal Territory (Planning) Act 1982	(10)	Notification Of Adoption Of The Draft Local Plan For The Federal Territory Of Kuala Lumpur -KLLP 2040
4.	Federal Territory (Planning) Act 1982	(11)	Federal Territory (Planning) (Classes Of Use Of Land And Buildings) (Federal Territory Of Kuala Lumpur) (Revocation) Rules 2025
4.	Federal Territory (Planning) Act 1982	(12)	Federal Territory (Planning) (Application For Planning Permission) (Federal Territory Of Kuala Lumpur) Rules 2025
5.	Road Transport Act 1987	(1)	Road Traffic Rules 1959
5.	Road Transport Act 1987	(2)	Traffic Signs (Size, Colour and Type ) Rules 1959
5.	Road Transport Act 1987	(3)	Goods Vehicles (Loading and Unloading) (Kuala Lumpur) Rules 1962
5.	Road Transport Act 1987	(4)	Road Traffic (Provision of Bus Terminus) City of Kuala Lumpur) Order 1973
5.	Road Transport Act 1987	(5)	Speed Limit (City of Kuala Lumpur) Order 1989
5.	Road Transport Act 1987	(6)	Road Transport (Slow Moving Vehicles) (Prohibition on Use of Road) (City of Kuala Lumpur) Order 1994
5.	Road Transport Act 1987	(7)	Road Transport (Compounding of Offences) Rules 2003
5.	Road Transport Act 1987	(8)	Road Transport (Notice Under Subsection 53(1)) Rules 2003
5.	Road Transport Act 1987	(9)	Road Transport (Taxi Cab Stands) (FTKL) Order 2007
5.	Road Transport Act 1987	(10)	Road Transport (Fee for Clamping, Removal and Detention of Motor Vehicles) Rules 2012
5.	Road Transport Act 1987	(11)	Road Transport (Stands for Public Service Vehicles) (FTKL) Order 2012
5.	Road Transport Act 1987	(12)	Road Transport (Provision of Parking Places) FTKL Order 2016
5.	Road Transport Act 1987	(13)	Road Transport (Reservation of Road as a Parking Place for Vehicles of Persons with Disabilities) (FTKL) Order 2017
6.	City of Kuala Lumpur Act 1971		
7.	Constitution (Amendment) (No. 2) Act 1973		
8.	Entertainment (Federal Territory of Kuala Lumpur) Act 1992	(1)	Entertainment (FTKL) Rules 1993
8.	Entertainment (Federal Territory of Kuala Lumpur) Act 1992	(2)	Entertainment (FTKL) (Compounding of Offences) Rules 1993
8.	Entertainment (Federal Territory of Kuala Lumpur) Act 1992	(3)	Entertainment (FTKL) (Declaration) Order 1994
8.	Entertainment (Federal Territory of Kuala Lumpur) Act 1992	(4)	Entertainment (FTKL) (Declaration) Order 2011
8.	Entertainment (Federal Territory of Kuala Lumpur) Act 1992	(5)	Cyber Centre and Cyber Cafe (FTKL) (Compounding of Offences) Rules 2012
9.	Hotels (Federal Territory of Kuala Lumpur) Act 2003	(1)	Hotels (FTKL) (Compoundubg of Offences) Regulations 2013
10.	Strata Management Act 2013	(1)	Strata Management (Strata Management Tribunal) Regulations 2015
10.	Strata Management Act 2013	(2)	Strata Management (Maintenance and Management) Regulations 2015
10.	Strata Management Act 2013	(3)	Strata Management (Compounding of Offences) Regulations 2019

== Past Management Members ==
=== As of 2 October 2018 ===
- Top Management
1. Nor Hisham Ahmad Dahlan, Mayor
2. Mohd Najib Mohd, executive director (Project Management)
3. Mahadi Che Ngah, executive director (Planning)
4. Ibrahim Yusoff, executive director (Socio-Economic Development)
5. Mustafa Mohd Nor, executive director (Management)
- City advisory board
1. Nor Hisham Ahmad Dahlan, Chairman
2. Abdul Ghani Pateh Akhir, Member
3. Fateh Iskandar Mohamed Mansor, Member
4. Ezumi Harzani Ismail, Member
