= List of commanders of the Order of Meritorious Service =

Below is a list of commanders of the Order of Meritorious Service from the order's creation in 1995 to the present day.

| Year | Public service | Local government / statutory bodies | Private sector / association / voluntary / sports | Military | Police | Political | Honorary | Total |
|---|---|---|---|---|---|---|---|---|
| 1995 | 2 | 0 | 8 | 0 | 0 | 0 | 0 | 10 |
| 1996 | 9 | 6 | 15 | 0 | 0 | 8 | 2 | 40 |
| 1997 | 6 | 5 | 25 | 0 | 0 | 0 | 2 | 38 |
| 1998 | 16 | 8 | 5 | 0 | 0 | 5 | 5 | 39 |
| 1999 | | | | | | | 1 | 49 |
| 2000 | | | | | | | 3 | 46 |
| 2001 | 11 | 7 | 15 | 1 | 2 | 5 | 3 | 44 |
| 2002 | 12 | 10 | 10 | 1 | 1 | 15 | 1 | 50 |
| 2003 | 10 | 8 | 22 | 1 | 1 | 12 | 9 | 63 |
| 2004 | 10 | 7 | 16 | 1 | 0 | 5 | 8 | 47 |
| 2005 | 8 | 6 | 14 | 3 | 1 | 8 | 5 | 45 |
| 2006 | 15 | 4 | 7 | 2 | 1 | 11 | 1 | 41 |
| 2007 | 10 | 7 | 19 | 2 | 3 | 19 | 6 | 66 |
| 2008 | 11 | 1 | 14 | 4 | 1 | 19 | 1 | 51 |
| 2009 | 7 | 8 | 10 | 5 | 2 | 8 | 3 | 43 |
| 2010 | 9 | 2 | 10 | 2 | 0 | 16 | 6 | 45 |
| 2011 | 14 | 6 | 22 | 4 | 0 | 18 | 7 | 71 |
| 2012 | 11 | 6 | 21 | 4 | 4 | 18 | 3 | 67 |
| 2013 | 12 | 2 | 17 | 5 | 2 | 21 | 1 | 60 |
| 2014 | 14 | 4 | 18 | 6 | 0 | 20 | 1 | 63 |
| 2015 | 11 | 8 | 15 | 1 | 4 | 17 | 0 | 56 |
| 2016 | 20 | 3 | 36 | 1 | 2 | 20 | 0 | 82 |
| 2017 | 8 | 1 | 8 | 2 | 2 | 28 | 2 | 51 |
| 2018 | 0 | 0 | 0 | 0 | 0 | 0 | 0 | 0 |
| 2019 | 11 | 4 | 6 | 7 | 3 | 0 | 0 | 31 |
| 2020 | 10 | 1 | 7 | 7 | 4 | 0 | 0 | 29 |
| 2021 | | | | | | | | |

== 1990s ==
=== 1995 ===
- Public Service Division
  - Asmat Kamaludin, Abdullah Abdul Rahman
- Private Sector / Association / Voluntary / Sports Division
  - Abdul Rahim Abdullah, S.C.E. Abraham, Abdul Kadir Jasin, Ismail Zakaria, Mohamed Razali Abdul Rahman, Nik Mohamed Nik Yaacob, Mohamed Zain Abdul Rashid, Leong Wye Keong

=== 1996 ===
- Public Service Division
  - Mazlan Ahmad, Ismail Mansor, Mohamad Khalil Mohamad Noor, Aris Othman, Baharun Azhar Raffiai, Hamid Bugo, Abdul Halim Ali, Tengku Mohd. Azzman Shariffadeen Tengku Ibrahim, Daniel Tajem, Eduardo Alberto Sadous (honorary)
- Local Government / Statutory Bodies Division
  - Abdul Aziz Sheikh Abdul Kadir, Yusof Basiron, Ahmad Tajuddin Ali, Jaafar Ahmad, Othman Yusoff, Mustapha Kamal Abu Bakar
- Private Sector / Association / Voluntary / Sports Division
  - Nor Azah Awin, Lim Thian Kiat, Raja Arshad Raja Tun Uda, Mohamed Mydin Mohd. Musa, C. Dwton, Khoo Eng Choo, Paddy Bowie, Yong Poh Kon, Syed Ahmad Syed Jamal, Maznah Abdul Hamid, Zainuddin Maidin, Lee Teck Yuen, V. V. Nathan, V. K. Chin, Abdullah Hussain, Lin Cheng Yuan (honorary)
- Political Organisations Division
  - Tan Chai Ho, Yong Teck Lee, Mohd. Ali Hassan, Mohamad Aziz, Kim Kok Khin, K.S. Balakrishnan, Chang Boon Hoe, M. Kayveas

=== 1997 ===
- Public Service Division
  - Ahmad Zabri Ibrahim, Abdul Kadir Mohamad, Nik Mohamed Affandi Nik Yusoff, Hadi Hashim, Neo Tong Lee, Haron Siraj
- Local Government / Statutory Bodies Division
  - Mazlan Othman, Muhammad Annas Mohd. Nor, Hod Parman, Abdul Jabar Kamin, Mohd. Sham Kasim
- Private Sector / Association / Voluntary / Sports Division
  - Michael Bong Thiam Joon, Lim Si Cheng, Sabariah Ahmad, Mohd. Nor Abdul Hamid, Rajasingam Mayilganam, Nik Ibrahim Nik Abdullah, Zahari Omar, Abdul Rahman Omar, Nik Safiah Karim, Mohinder Singh @ Kaka Singh S. Sucha Singh, Hassan Abas, Johan Jaafar, Yeoh Poh Hong, Abu Bakar Abdul Hamid, Zakiah Hanum Abdul Hamid, Khatijah Ahmad, G. Gnanalingam Gunanathlingam, Abu Sahid Mohamed, Kamarudin Taib, Mohan Swami, Syed Mokhtar Shah Syed Nor, Juhar Mahiruddin, Ahmad Shahibuddin Mohd. Noor, Abdul Rashid Abdul Rahman, Lau Hieng Ing, Takeshi Furuta (honorary), Yoichi Morishita (honorary)

=== 1998 ===
- Public Service Division
  - Zakaria Abdul Hamid, Steve Shim Lip Kiong, Abdullah Kuntom, Syed Alwi Syed Nordin, Jaafar Ismail, Ti Thiow Hee, Manikavasagam Jegathesan Vasagam, P. Venugopal @ Venugopalan V. K. Menon, Mohd. Zam Abdul Wahab, Matnor Daim, Ahmad Padzli Mohyiddin, Zainal Abidin Alias, Omar Mohamed Dan, Yahya Yaacob, Nuraizah Abdul Hamid, Umar Abu, Jean-Claude Paye (honorary)
- Local Government / Statutory Bodies Division
  - Fong Weng Phak, Alexius Ernald Delilkan, Megat Zaharuddin Megat Mohd. Nor, Ann Abdul Majid, Paul Low Seng Kuan, Ruby Lee, Amirsham Abdul Aziz, Shahril Shamsuddin
- Private Sector / Association / Voluntary / Sports Division
  - Mohamad Salleh Ismail, Lim Cheng Ean, Tengku Mahaleel Tengku Ariff, Abdul Rahman Ramli, Gerald Francis De Silva, Ting Tsung Chao (honorary), Mihaela Y. Smith (honorary), Norio Ohga (honorary), Yoshiko Y. Nakano (honorary)
- Political Organisations Division
  - Ong Tee Keat, Vincent Lee Fook Long, Steven Tan Kok Hiang, Govindaraj Veradarajulu, Geoffrey Yee Lung Fook

=== 1999 ===
  - Mohamed Hashim Ahmad Makaruddin, Hilaliah Mohd. Yusof, Muhammad Rais Abdul Karim, Abdul Hamid Zainal Abidin, Muhammad Kamil Awang, Ismail Adam, Sidek @ Abdul Aziz Muhammad, Fawzia Abdullah, Megat Burhainuddin Megat Abdul Rahman, Mohd. Zaini Abdul Rahman, Lum Weng Kee, Soh Chai Hock, Abdul Jamil Mohd. Ali, Abdul Shukor Abdullah, Mohamad Noor Abdul Rahim, Abdul Aziz Muhamad, Mohamed Adnan Ali, Wan Abdullah @ Wan Hashim Wan Daud, Shahrir Nasir, Abdul Habib Mansur, Maulub Maamin, Nawi Alias, Abdul Razak Hussain, Ahmad Zaharudin Idrus, Ahmad Zaidee Laidin, Anuwar Ali, Mohamed Fadzil Mohd. Yunus, Azmi Abdul Wahab, Tan Check Hong, Jaafar Abu Bakar, Ridwan Abu Bakar, Robaayah Zambahari, Lai Jaat Kong, Oh Siew Nam, Zainal Aznam Mohd. Yusof, Rajandram Chellappah, Zainal Abidin Abdul Hamid, Raj Abdul Karim, Tay Ah Lek, Ta Kin Yan, Prince Guneratnam S. E. Guneratnam, Abdul Rashid Ngah, Junus Wahid, Zaki Azmi, Hanafi Ramli, Sahadevan Baliah, Sambanthamurthi Subramaniam, Chua Swee Chung, Yugi Kawata (honorary)

== 2000s ==
=== 2000 ===
  - Abdul Wahab Adam, Zainul Ariff Hussain, Alias Ali, Khalid Husin, Syed Muhamad Syed Abdul Kadir, Hasmy Agam, Azizan Ayob, Fong Joo Chung, Abdul Aziz Hassan, Mohd. Ramly Abu Bakar, Suleiman Mahmud, Abdul Halil Abdul Mutalib, Abdul Karim Haron, Najirah Mohd. Tassaduk Khan, Mohd. Kassa Abdul Aziz, Zainun Aishah Ahmad, Osman Bakar, Ashari Che Mat, Abdullah Yusoff, Kisai Rahmat, Chong Wei Yoon, Desmond Lim Siew Choon, Wan Lokman Wan Ibrahim, Teh Kian An, Jagjit Singh G. S. Sambhi, Wan Kassim Ahmed, Ahmad Rejal Arbee Mohamed Isa Arbee, Abdul Sukor Shahar, Lim Chee Wah, Anthony Ratos Domingos Ratos, Hamad Kama Piah Che Othman, Mohd. Nasir Muda, Mohaiyani Shamsudin, Krishnan Packrisamy, Bernard Wang Tsun Hao, David Chua Kok Tee, Ian Chia Kay Meng, Mohd. Napi @ Nakhaie Ahmad, Omar Othman, Tengku Adnan Tengku Mansor, Ooi Tuan Heo, Nyanapandithan @ Gananapandythan Muthandi @ M. G. Pandithan, K. Ravindran C. Kutty Krishnan, Achmad Sutjipto (honorary), Md. Jaafar Abdul Aziz (honorary), Peter Jenkins (honorary)

=== 2001 ===
- Public Service Division
  - Zainun Ali, Mohamad Shaid Mohamad Taufek, Denis Ong Jiew Fook, Siti Hadzar Mohd. Ismail, Zul Mukhshar Mohamed Shaari, Abdul Razak Ramli, Abdul Rafie Mahat, Arshad Hashim, Ng Kam Chiu, Nik Mohd. Zain Nik Yusof, Anis Ahmad, Edgar E. Nordman (honorary)
- Local Government / Statutory Bodies Division
  - Ali Abdul Kadir, Chua Soon Poh, Abdul Rahman Abdullah, Mohd. Zulkifli Mohd. Ghazali, Abdul Razak Dawood Sultan, Wan Awang Wan Yaacob, Burhanuddin Ahmad Tajudin
- Private Sector / Association / Voluntary / Sports Division
  - Sim Peng Choon, Shuaib Lazim, K. John Kuruvilla Kuruvilla, Mohd. Yusof Mohd. Haslam, Ishak Imam Abas, Lee Chong Meng, Son Ting Kueh, Lim Kim Hong, Yim Khai Kee, Athimulam Nadason, Fong Chin Tuck, Shim Kong Yip, Roger Tan Kim Hock, Choot Ewe Seng, Tiong Su Kouk, John F. Coyne (honorary)
- Military Division
  - Abdul Ghafir Abdul Hamid
- Police Division
  - Yaacob Mohd. Amin, Abdul Hamid Mustapha, Narongvich Thaitong (honorary)
- Political Organisations Division
  - Mansor Mohd. Jaafar, Abdullah Ali, Wan Hanafiah Wan Mohd. Saman, Wan Mohd. Mahyiddin Wan Nawang, Chong Tho Chin

=== 2002 ===
- Public Service Division
  - Sulong Matjeraie, Clement Allan Skinner, Mohd. Hashim Yahaya, Mohamad Shahir Abdullah, Hadenan Abdul Jalil, Zubir Ali, Siti Maslamah Osman, Sulaiman Mahbob, Abdullah Mohd. Tahir, Raja Malik Saripulazan Raja Kamaruzaman, Halim Shafie, Mahamad Zabri Min, Jeffery Sandragesan (honorary)
- Local Government / Statutory Bodies Division
  - Abdul Manaf Ahmad, Salleh Mohd. Nor, Mohamed Arif Nun, Ahmed Tasir Lope Pihie, Abu Hassan Kendut, Saharan Anang, Mazlan Ahmad, Abdullah Jonid, Syed Tamim Ansari Syed Mohamed, Maruan Mohamad Said
- Private Sector / Association / Voluntary / Sports Division
  - Joseph Maduranayagam M. Rajaratnam, Mohamed Zaini Amran, Ooi Han Eng, Yap Fung Kong, Oh Chong Peng, Mohamed Haniffa Abdullah, Ismail Mohd. Salleh, Chen Lok Loi, Johan Thambu Abdul Malek, Mohamad Omar Yaakob
- Military Division
  - Abdul Hamid Ibrahim
- Police Division
  - Mohd. Yusof Abdul Rahman
- Political Organisations Division
  - Awang Jabar, Mohd. Ghazali Ahmad, Mustapha Taib, Abu Bakar Abdul Manap, Abdul Hamid Abdul Rahman, Haidar Ali Sheikh Fadzir, Yap Chik Dong, Khoo Lay Hin, Ampikaipakan S. Kandiah, Chandrasegar Suppiah, Justine Jinggot, Wong Yit Ming, Frederick Jinu, Low Pooi Chai, Khoo Che Wat

=== 2003 ===
- Public Service Division
  - Abdul Rahman Idris, Abdul Aziz Husain, Keizrul Abdullah, Zaitun Zawiyah Puteh, Rastam Mohd. Isa, Zulkipli Mat Noor, Mohd. Ismail Merican, Rohani Ramli, Iskandar Dzakurnain Badarudin, Sheikh Ghazali Abdul Rahman, Elihu Lauterpacht (honorary), James Richard Crawford (honorary), Nicolaas Jan Schrijver (honorary)
- Local Government / Statutory Bodies Division
  - Abdul Monir Yaacob, Ng Teck, Mahmood Abdul Kadir, Syed Jamil Syed Jaafar, Ketheeswaran M. Kanagaratnam, Kamarulzaman Darus, Ahmad Ghazi Abdul Hamid, Anuar Ahmad
- Private Sector / Association / Voluntary / Sports Division
  - Vaithilingam Ampalavanar, Abdullah Malim Baginda, Nordin Ibrahim, Abdul Ghani Abdullah, Abdul Samad Alias, Syarifah Aini Syed Jaafar, Karim Abu Bakar, Mohd. Hashim Hassan, Zainuddin Muhammad, Arumugam Ara Nachiappan, Lai Kuai Weng, Jemilah Mahmood, Baba Mohd. Deni, Ooi Chean See, Hii Yu Ho, Choo Keng Kit, Lakshmanan Krishnan, Khamil Jamil, Izhar Sulaiman, Syed Hussian Syed Junid, Mohd. Sidik Shaik Osman, Liew Poon Siak, Eiro Sakamoto (honorary), Timothy Garland (honorary), Yoshihiro Uehara (honorary), Yukio Shohtoku (honorary), Nicholas Zefferys (honorary), Peter Michael Wentworth (honorary)
- Military Division
  - Adenan Mohamad Zain
- Police Division
  - Salleh Mat Som
- Political Organisations Division
  - Krishnasamy Shiman, Mastika Junaidah Husin, Halimah Mohamed Sadique, Muhamad Abdullah, Maglin Dennis D' Cruz, Wan Junaidi Tuanku Jaafar, Ho Yoon Ping, Sharifah Aminah Syed Ahmad, Abu Kamis, Wan Mohamad Najib Wan Mohamad, Syed Abdillah Syed Abbas Alhabshee, Ibrahim Thambychik

=== 2004 ===
- Public Service Division
  - Ahmad Tajudin Mohd. Jaafar, Khalid Ramli, Azman Abdul Rashid, Faizah Mohammed Tahir, Othman Abdul Razak, Abdul Majid Hussein, Zaharah Ibrahim, Abdul Rahim Abdul, Isahak Yeop Mohammad Shar, Marzuki Mohammad Noor, Thomas Anthonius Haziroglou (honorary), Ernest Ziegler Bower (honorary), Manuel Condeminas (honorary), Helmut Baur (honorary), Jurgen Heiderman (honorary), Omar Muhieddine Jundi (honorary)
- Local Government / Statutory Bodies Division
  - Manogran @ Manoharan Paramasivam, K. Y . Mustafa, Azlan Mohd. Zainol, Abdul Hamid Sawal, Ibrahim Abu Shah, Abu Huraira Abu Yazid, Khamis Md. Som
- Private Sector / Association / Voluntary / Sports Division
  - K. Anthony @ Merlyn Kasimir, Jaafar Hussin, Azzat Kamaludin, Mustafa Mansur, Che Yazid Che Seman @ Yazid Othman, Nik Sapeia Nik Yusof, Rashpal Singh Jeswant Singh, Lakshmanan Nachiappan, Abdul Sukor @ Shukor Mohd. Hassan, Mohamed Jin Samsudin, Mohd. Khalid Mohd., Rafiah Salim, Ahmad Khan Nawab Khan, Ahmad Abdul Talib, Kwong Tse Woon, Abdul Rahim Hashim, Kunio Nakamura (honorary), Nurset Arsel (honorary)
- Military Division
  - Ilyas Din
- Political Organisations Division
  - Sivalingam Munusamy, Michael Chong Ten Soo, Tan Teck Poh, Subrayan A. Sellapan, Othman Jais

=== 2005 ===
- Public Service Division
  - Syed Ahmad Helmy Syed Ahmad, Fateh Chand Pars Ram, Kee Sue Sing, Mohamad Razali Mahusin, Nazariah Mohd. Khalid, Su Geok Yiam, Zaharah Shaari, Zaharaton Raja Zainal Abidin, A.K.M. Shahidul Islam (honorary), Husamettin Sinlak (honorary), Issei Nomura (honorary), Park Myung Jae (honorary)
- Local Government / Statutory Bodies Division
  - Alim Ariffin, Hamzah Hasan, Mohammed Zabidi Dasuki, Raja Sharifuddin Hizan Raja Zainal Abidin, Abdul Razak Abdul Latiff, Ainon Marziah Wahi
- Private Sector / Association / Voluntary / Sports Division
  - Aishah Shaikh Ahmad, Dzulkarnain Abdul Rahman, Johari Abdul Ghani, Mahendran Thuraiappah, Meriam Ya'acob, Mohd. Nasir Ahmad, Mohd. Idris Tulis, Murphy Nicholas Xavier Pakiam, Nor Ashikin Ahmad Mokhtar, Ramli Ibrahim, Teo Choo Kum, Teoh Siang Chin, Zakaria Ahmad, Zakaria Hashim
- Military Division
  - Khairuddin Mat Yusof, Ramlan Mohamed Ali, Wan Abu Bakar Omar, Winai Phattiyakul (honorary)
- Police Division
  - Kamarudin Mohamad Ali
- Political Organisations Division
  - Abdul Rahim Ahmad, Chang Yok Ying, Faridah Alias, Ho Lim Teck, Mohan A. Kandasamy, Puraviappan Arunasalam Pillay, Richard Riot Jaem, Rosli Mat Hassan

=== 2006 ===
- Public Service Division
  - Abdul Hamid Othman, Abdul Aziz Mohammed, Abdullah Abdul Wahab, Ahmad Ridzwan Arshad, Chew Peng Hong, Hamid Ali, Hamidon Ali, K.P. Gengadharan C.R. Nair, Linton Albert, Mohammad Tap Salleh, Mustafa Osman, Siti Azizah Sheikh Abod, Siti Mariah Ahmad, Victor Wee Eng Lye, Zulkurnain Awang
- Local Government / Statutory Bodies Division
  - Ruslin Hasan, Zamani Md. Noor, Abdul Rahim Mohd. Zin, Ahmad Othman Merican
- Private Sector / Association / Voluntary / Sports Division
  - Kuthubul Zaman Bukhari, Mohamed Zain Mohamed Yusuf, Mohd. Jais Ahmad, Ow Chee Sheng, Rameli Musa, Rosti Saruwono, Yeow Kian Chai, James Chao Yuan Hsiu (honorary)
- Military Division
  - Mat Rabi Abu Samah, Muhammad Ismail Jamaluddin
- Police Division
  - Hairuddin Mohamed
- Political Organisations Division
  - Abdul Fatah Iskandar, Ahmad Kemin, Denison Jayasooria, Harun Abdullah, Hashim Ismail, Lo Kong Boon, Nik Mohd. Zain Omar, Salmiah A.G. Monong, Tan Kim Leong, Thulukanam Sinnapayan, Yaakob Mohammad

=== 2007 ===
- Public Service Division
  - Kamaruddin Mohamed Baria, Idrus Harun, Zulkefli A. Hassan, Suboh Mohd. Yassin, Rajmah Hussain, Jamaliah Kamis, Zakiah Ahmad, Suraiya Hani Hussein, Noor Hisham Abdullah, Ahmad Fuad Abdul Aziz, Samir Alkour (honorary)
- Local Government / Statutory Bodies Division
  - Nik Mustapha R. Abdullah, Ismee Ismail, Abdul Shukor Abdul Rahman, Shamsul Amri Baharuddin, Mohd. Ghazali Mohd. Noor, Abdul Razak Mohd. Ali, Abdul Rahman Sulaiman, Sir Colin Campbell (honorary)
- Private Sector / Association / Voluntary / Sports Division
  - Kamaruzaman Che Mat, Hong Lee Pee, Marimuthu Nadason, Suslita Abdul Majid, Mohamed Ariff Abdul Kareem, Mohd. Ilyas Zainol Abidin, Abdul Aziz Yahya, Abdul Azez Satta, Noorhayati Kamaluddin, Syed Abdull Hafiz Syed Abu Bakar, Abu Bakar Abdul Karim, Abdul Malek Munip, Suhaidi Sulaiman, Abdullah Karim, Nasarudin Mohammed Idris, Idris Jala, Chua Teck Hwee, Mohamad Danel @ Bujang Abong, Suhaimi Mohamad Zain, Des Alwi Abu Bakar (honorary), James Chao Yuan Hsiu (honorary), Donald Eugene Blake (honorary), Richard Leete (honorary)
- Military Division
  - Masood Zainal Abidin, Abdul Aziz Jaafar
- Police Division
  - Abang Abdul Wahap Abang Julai, Christopher Wan Soo Kee, Mohammad Amir Sulaiman
- Political Organisations Division
  - Sabapathy Arumugam, Lee Heng, Mohamad Ashfar Mohamad Ali, Abdul Azim Mohd. Zabidi, Hii Tiong Kuoh, Soon Choon Teck, Sabaratnam Kanapathy Pillai, Wilfred Bumburing, Victor Emmanuel @ T.V.E. Majanil, Bridget Anne Chin Hun Yee, Tiong King Sing, Subramaniam K.V.S. Sathasivam, Yong Ming Sang, Ooi Saw Choo, Abdullah Shiekh Mohamed, Tajudin Ismail, Raja Ahmad Zainuddin Raja Omar, Samat Aripin, Patawari Patawe

=== 2008 ===
- Public Service Division
  - Kamaruzaman Mohd. Nor, Abdul Khalil Abdul Hamid, Mohtar Abas, Harjit Singh Pritam Singh, Fatimah Md. Deni, Shukry Mohamed Salleh, Ahmad Said Hamdan, Othman Hashim, Salim Hashim, Thomas George M.S. George, Mohamed Thajudeen Abdul Wahab
- Local Government / Statutory Bodies Division
  - Syed Ali Tawfik Al-Attas
- Private Sector / Association / Voluntary / Sports Division
  - Mohamad Radzif Mohamad Yunus, Abdul Ghafar Ramli, Paul Chan Tuck Hoong, Wan Mohamed Wan Embong, Jasbir Singh Amar Singh, Ng Seing Liong, Harun Hashim Mohd., Ravindra Dass Valoth Govindan, Abdul Rahman Hamid, Yeop Junior Yeop Adlan, M.R. Gopala Krishnan C.R.K. Pillai, Chiam Heng Keng, Mohd. Shu'aib Ishak, Hishamuddin Aun, Tristan Beauchamp Russell (honorary)
- Military Division
  - Zulkifeli Mohamad Zin, Mohamed Amdan Kurish, Shahron Ibrahim, Bashir Abu Bakar
- Police Division
  - Ramli Sha'ari
- Political Organisations Division
  - Kalimullah Masheerul Hassan, Chan Siaw Hee, Abit Joo, Samson David Maman, Chua Khen Siong, Ahmad Zahri Jamil, Fatimah Abdul Majid, Othman L. Saad, Ali Mohamed, Faridah Abu Hassan, Subbaiyah Palaniappan, Freddie Long Hoo Hin, Kee Ah Kau, Yew Tuan Chiew, Mohammad Nazar Samad, Hassan Ahmad, Jamilah Wahab, Musa Sheikh Fadzir, Abdul Latiff Mirasa

=== 2009 ===
- Public Service Division
  - Normah Md. Yusof, Muhammad Mukhtar Boerhannoeddin, Gopal Sri Ram, Mohd. Zain Mohd. Dom, Mohamad Ghazali Mohamad Yusoff, Vincent Ng Kim Khoay, Nik Moustpha Nik Hassan
- Local Government / Statutory Bodies Division
  - Adinan Maning, Mohd. Basri Wahid, Shad Saleem Faruqui, Mohd. Badlisham Ghazali, Choo Yuen May, Hasni Harun, Wan Zulkiflee Wan Ariffin, Manharlal Ratilal, Syed Ahmad Alwee Alsree (honorary)
- Private Sector / Association / Voluntary / Sports Division
  - Abdul Ghani Minhat, Mohamad Nor Khalid, Mohamed Mackeen Abdul Majid, Ilani Isahak, Shaheen Chugtai Mirza Habib Jan, Mohammed Hamzah Mohammed Kassim, Mohd. Noor Amin Mohd. Noor Khan, Nik Azman Mohamed Zain, Yee Ming Seng, Yii Ming Tang, Eric Tan (honorary), Peter Richard Brokenshire (honorary)
- Military Division
  - Raja Mohamed Affandi Raja Mohamed Noor, Sulaiman Abdullah, Mohammed Noordin Ali, Abdul Rahman Khamis, Lai Chung Wah
- Police Division
  - Hussin Ismail, Mashuri Zainal
- Political Organisations Division
  - Lee Kim Shin, Wilfred Rata Nissom, Osman Bungsu, Noor Zahidi Omar, Zihim Mohd. Hassan, Siw Chun Eam, Thamby Raja, Norah Abdul Rahman

== 2010s ==
=== 2010 ===
- Public Service Division
  - Abdul Jabar Che Nai, Azizah Arshad, Ghazali T.V. Ahmad Kutty, Hussin Ahamad, Jeyaindran Sinnadurai, Latifah Abu Mansor, Muhamad Radzi Abdul Rahman, Mohamed Yusof Zainal Abiden, Puteh Rukiah Abdul Majid, Russell Walker Strong (honorary)
- Local Government / Statutory Bodies Division
  - Mohammad Izat Hasan, Najib Abdullah, Rifaat Ahmed Abdel Karim (honorary)
- Private Sector / Association / Voluntary / Sports Division
  - Aishah Ong, Che Mohamed Nawawi Ismail, Goh Ah Bah, Hardew Kaur Hazar Singh, Jamil Sulong, Mohamed Azman Yahya, Nadraja Ratnam, Parmjit Singh Meva Singh, Wan Ahmad Fauzi Hashim, Teo Geck Heng, Imhoff Andreas Balthasar (honorary), Kwek Len San (honorary), Kirinde Dhammaratena Thero (honorary)
- Military Division
  - Ahmad Kamarulzaman Ahmad Badaruddin, Allatif Mohamed Noor
- Police Division
  - Gories Mere (honorary)
- Political Organisations Division
  - Aaron Ago Dagang, Abdul Aziz Kaprawi, Abdul Rauf Yusoh, Ahmad Jazlan Yaakub, Alexander Nanta Linggi, Chua Kim Chuan, Gnanasambantham Doraisamy, Henrynus Amin, Lee Ah Fat, Lily Yong Lee Lee, Mohamad Nasir Ibrahim, Ng See Tiong, Rajakupal Sinathamby, Sheah Zwat Tsang, Swin Jema'ah, Teo Chee Kang

=== 2011 ===
- Public Service Division
  - Majid Hamzah, Ahmad Kabit, Noriyah Ahmad, Wan Selamah Wan Sulaiman, Abdul Aziz Kasim, Norma Mansor, Zainol Othman, Mohd. Sukor Abdul Manan, Raja Azahar Raja Abdul Manap, Abdul Aziz Jamaluddin, Abdul Kadir Taib, Syed Omar Syed Mohamad, Zalekha Hassan, Govindan Kunchamboo, Hassan Salleh (honorary), Evelyn Genta (honorary), Noureddine Ayed (honorary)
- Local Government / Statutory Bodies Division
  - Zabidah Ismail, Looi Lai Meng, Abdul Rahman Abdul Jamal, Ibrahim Ahmad, Bashir Ahmad Fateh Mohamed, Mizan Adiliah Ahmad Ibrahim
- Private Sector / Association / Voluntary / Sports Division
  - Rajagobal Krishnasamy, Abdul Azeez Abdul Rahim, Sunny Goh Teck Chin, Tan Kean Soon, Jaafar Mohamad, Lim Boon Siong, Abdullah Ahmad, Che Azizuddin Che Ismail, Kenny Ng Bee Ken, Ng Moon Hing, Abdul Wahab Abdullah, Mohd. Nawawi Awang, Yii Chi Hau, Lim Eng Kok, Cheng Lai Hock, Ter Leong Yap, Mohd. Omar Mustapha, Arumugam Rengasamy (posthumous), Mohanadas Nagappan, Magendran M. Munisamy, Sia Hiong Ngee, Siti Zaleha Hussin, Ghanim Saad M. Alsaad Al-Kuwari (honorary), Ikbal Abouelkacem Abbassi (honorary), George Che-Ching Wang (honorary)
- Military Division
  - Zulkifli Zainal Abidin, Ahmad Hasbullah Mohamad Nawawi, Abdul Hadi Hussin, Mohd. Ariffin Mohd. Rosli
- Police Division
  - Tritot Ronnaritivichai (honorary)
- Political Organisations Division
  - Kamilia Ibrahim, Mohamad Salim Fateh Din, Hanafi Mamat, Abdul Shariff Hamid, Khor Ing Hua, Ng Ah Chua, Koh Chee Chai, Krishnan Maniam, Munusamy Mareemuthu, Ng Siew Lai, Chan Seng Khai, Lim Ming Hoo, Stephen Rundi Utom, K. D. Siva Kumar Krishnadas, Albert Boyou, Ling Kong Mee, John Sikie Tayai, Yap Kea Ping

=== 2012 ===
- Public Service Division
  - Ngah Senik, Yew Jen Kie, Rebecca Fatima Sta Maria, Christopher Lee Kwok Choong, Mohammed Saffari Mohammed, Zoal Azha Yusof, Ahmad Husaini Sulaiman, Ahmad Phesal Talib, Mohd. Aiseri Alias, Rasli Basir, Halimaton Hamdan, Mark James Stewart (honorary)
- Local Government / Statutory Bodies Division
  - Muhammad Ibrahim, Shahril Ridza Ridzuan, Muhamad Chali @ Zamani Abdul Ghani, Noharuddin Nordin @ Harun, Zaini Ujang, Muhammad Uthman El-Muhammady, Khadem Abdulla Al Qubaisi (honorary)
- Private Sector / Association / Voluntary / Sports Division
  - John Joe Raj Jr., Muhammad Anuar Taib, Bakry Hamzah, Mohamed Rafiq Mohamed Ibrahim, Abdullah Sani Abdullah Karim, Syed Jaafar Syed Aznan, Ismail Ibrahim, Thavarajah Chinniah, Achaiah Kumar Rao Subramaniam, Syed Ali Mohamed Alattas, Syed Abu Bakar Syed Mohsin Almohdzar, Shahrol Azral Ibrahim Halmi, Sundra Rajoo Nadarajah, Ismet Suki, Syed Izuan Syed Kamarulbahrin, Yap Sooi Yin, Ong Siew Swan, Ong Gaik Thiang, Nor Azman Hamidun, Muhammad Faizal Zainol, Goh Ah Lek, Takashi Hibi (honorary)
- Military Division
  - Roslan Saad, Jamil Haji Osman, Zulkiple Haji Kassim, Jusoh Daud
- Police Division
  - Mohamad Bakri Mohamad Zinin, Mohamad Fuzi Harun, Navaratnam Appadurai, Mohamad Jamil Mohamad Hassan
- Political Organisations Division
  - Ahmad Shalimin Ahmad Shafie, Suraya Yaacob, Faisyal Yusof Hamdain Diego, Tahir Mohamad Taat, Hoo Seong Chang, Tan Chik Heok, Murugesan Sinnandavar, Frederick Bayoi Manggie, Tan Chong Meng, Hii Chii Kok, Zakaria Abdul Rahman, Kwan Wing Hung, Samson Chin Chee Tsu, Balang Rining, Pau Chiong Ung, Doris Sophia Brodi, Nityananthan Munusamy, Azmi Che Hussain

=== 2013 ===
- Public Service Division
  - Madinah Mohamad, Rahamat Bivi Yusoff, Ong Hong Peng, Che Mohd. Hashim Abdullah, Othman Mahmood, Mohammad Kamal Yan Yahaya, Abdul Malik Ishak, Anwari Suri, Gulam Hussin Gulam Haniff, Mohamad Fadzil Mohamad Khir, Muhammad Safian Ismail, Osman Jamal @ Jamar
- Local Government / Statutory Bodies Division
  - Awang Sariyan, Kamarudin Hussin
- Private Sector / Association / Voluntary / Sports Division
  - Ganendran Sarvananthan, Franki Anthony Dass, Ahmad Suhaimi Hashim, Zang Toi, Tan Teow Choon, Boon Weng Siew, Norminshah Sabirin, Kamarudin Meranun, Hashim Wahir, Tan Say Jim, Jimmy Choo, Mohamed Faroz Mohamed Jakel, Lim Ah Nge, Lim Kim Chong, Awalan Abdul Aziz, Chiau Beng Teik, Chai Meng Kui, Peter Robert Vogt (honorary)
- Military Division
  - Mohamad Zaki Hamzah, Ackbal Abdul Samad, Ahmad Kamal Yahya, Kamaruddin Mattan, Abdul Razak Md. Yusoff
- Police Division
  - Ishak Kasim, Syed Ismail Syed Azizan
- Political Organisations Division
  - C. Josephine Anne, Noriah Mahat, Low Teh Hian, Andrew Lim Tatt Keong, Wong Koon Mun, Chung Hon Cheong, R. Moorthy Ramasamy, Yap Yeow Ho, William Tanyuh Nub, Ang Chai Fah, Wahbi Junaidi, Balanggung @ Egbert Evaristus, Wong Thien Fook, Chiew Yen Fong, Radin Malleh, Joseph Mauh Ikeh, Devanand C. Mangharam, Mohd. Hassin @ Mohd. Hashim Daud, Hamim Samuri, Abdul Kadir P.A. Moidutty, Mohd. Hafarizam Harun

=== 2014 ===
- Public Service Division
  - Ainoon Othman, Azailiza Mohd. Ahad, Azimah Omar, Engku Nor Faizah Engku Atek, Hasanah Abdul Hamid, Himmat Singh Ralla Singh, Jayasiri Jayasena, Johari Siregar Adnan, Mohamad Yahaya Basimin, Rohani Abdullah, Salman L. Ahmad, Sharifah Zarah Syed Ahmad, Zainuddin Ibrahim, Syed Unan Mashri Syed Abdullah
- Local Government / Statutory Bodies Division
  - Wahid Omar, Yahaya Ibrahim, Mohd. Nizom Sairi, Mazeni Alwi
- Private Sector / Association / Voluntary / Sports Division
  - Abu Hanifah Noordin, Doraisingam Rengasamy, Gobalakrishnan Narayanasamy, Mohd. Daud Bakar, Nik Norzrul Thani N. Hassan Thani, Rosman Hasan, Suseela Menon T.A.S Menon, Tong Poh Keow, Rajasingam Murugasu, Md. Nizam Md. Sherif, Tay Swee Gim, Gan Eng Hong, Kenneth Vun, Lau Kueng Chai, Richard Eng, Cheng Joo An, Zainol Izzet Mohamed Ishak, Kong Woon Jun
- Military Division
  - Abdul Hadi Abdul Rashid, Abdul Aziz Ibrahim, Che Akmar Mohamad Nor, Mohd. Zaki Mokhtar, Nasaruddin Othman, William Rangit Stevenson
- Police Division
  - Saridchai Anakevieng (honorary)
- Political Organisations Division
  - Ismail Mohamed Said, Liang Teck Meng, Lihan Jok, Metah @ Michael Asang, Michael S. Malanjun, Mohammed Mosin Abdul Razak, Mohd. Nardin Awang, Mohamad Puad Zarkashi, Palaniappan, Paul Igai, Rahmani @ Rohani Abdullah, Rokiah Hashim, Tay Puay Chuan, Teo Eng Tee, William @ Nyallau Badak, Nadarajah Annamalai, Sim Kui Hian, Lau Pang Heng, Yek Siew Hui, Ahmad Kamaruzaman Mohamed Baria

=== 2015 ===
- Public Service Division
  - Amer Hamzah Mohd. Yunus, Annies Mohamed Ariff, Husni Zai Yaacob, Khairiyah Abdul Muttalib, Loo Took Gee, Mat Noor Nawi, Nagarajan N. Marie, Wan Hamidah Wan Ibrahim, Yeow Chin Kiong, Badariah Sahamid, Prasad Sandosham Abraham
- Local Government / Statutory Bodies Division
  - Mohd. Amin Nordin Abdul Aziz, Mohd. Noh Dalimin, Mohd. Yaakub Johari, Noor Azlan Ghazali, Redza Rafiq Abdul Razak, Rosli Mohd. Ali, Salmah Hayati Ghazali, Wong Lai Sum
- Private Sector / Association / Voluntary / Sports Division
  - Lee Hwa Cheng, Liew Kooi Leng, Kong Hoi Chieng, Lim Kok Boon, Lim Tow Boon, Lok Yim Pheng, Subramaniam Nachimuthu, Tang Vee Mun, Tee Guan Pian, Wan Seri @ Wan Asiah Ahmad, Zahri Edin, Zainudin Ibrahim, Zulkefli Sharif, Mohamed Nizam Mohamed Jakel, Omar Osman
- Military Division
  - Sabri Adam
- Police Division
  - Atan Aman, Mortadza Nazarene, Muhammad Fuad Abu Zarim, Sulaiman Mohd. Hassan
- Political Organisations Division
  - Alfred Midoli Lojitan, Asharuddin Ahmad, Chen Thin Kong, Goh Ah Ling, Ho Jia Lit, Janggu Banyang, Karuppanan M. Malairaja, Mansor Musa, Matrona D'Cruz Tharsis D' Cruz, Mohd. Zain Ahmad, Muhammad Yadzan Mohamad, Norliza Abdul Rahim, Roger Tan Kor Mee, Ugak Kumbong, Wong Aik Loung, Yong Oui Fah, Zainal Abidin Abdul Rahim

=== 2016 ===
- Public Service Division
  - Kamardin Hashim, Harmindar Singh Dhaliwal Pritam Singh, Vernon Ong Lam Kiat, Asma Ismail, Adanan Mohamed Hussain, Mohd. Faudzi Che Mamat, Jalil Marzuki, Abdul Ghani Salleh, Shahnaz Murad, Almalena Sharmila Johan Thambu, Iskandar Mohd. Kaus, Amhari Efendi Nazaruddin, Anne Rachel John, Mohamad Ezam Mohd. Nor, Soon Ruey, Zainal Ariffin Azizi, Roslan Abdul Rahman, Bakar Din, Sundaran Annamalai (posthumous), Anthony Kevin Morais Francis Albert Morais (posthumous)
- Local Government / Statutory Bodies Division
  - Hafsah Hashim, Sharif Haron, Azizan Baharuddin
- Private Sector / Association / Voluntary / Sports Division
  - Cha Hoo Peng, Chan Wei Beng, Che Muhaya Mohamad, Chiong Geok Eng, Daud Amatzin, Faridah Mat Saman, Fatimah Sulaiman, Fazlur-Rahman Zainuddin, Junainah Abdul Hamid, Kamalul Arifin Othman, Kang Hua Keong, Kumaran Nadaraja, Kwan Foh Kwai, Leelavathi K Govindasamy, Lim Chai Beng, Ling Sii Kiong, M. Chareon Sae Tang, Mazli Mohan Alias, Mohamad Dolmat, Mohamed Ilyas Pakeer Mohamed, Mohammad Tahir Rahat Khan, Mohammed Farid Mohammed Adnan, Nik Airina Nik Jaffar, Noraini Soltan, Norazam Shah Ibrahim, Nordin Mat Yusoff, Ooi Kee Liang, Ramlan Abdul Malek, See To Choong, Sharuddin Omar, Sing Sai Hiang, Sivanyanam Sinnathamby, Tan Choon Peow, Quek Chee Hiang, Tai Hee, Abdul Rahman Ibrahim
- Military Division
  - Abdul Mutalib Abdul Wahab
- Police Division
  - Zaleha Abdul Rahman, Zulkifli Abdullah
- Political Organisations Division
  - Awang Bujang Awang Antek, Chin Shu Ying, Ding Kuong Hiing, Jamaluddin Mohd. Radzi, Juani Johnny Mositun, Kiat Swee Sung, Mohd. Jais Sarday, Nor Azam Mohammad Taib, Abdul Razak Abdul Rahman, Noordin Yaani, Mohamad Osman Mohamad Jailu, Sakthivel Alagappan, Supramaniam Ramalingam, Toh Chiew Peng, Wee Chong Yan, Tan Kok Hong, Teo Kwan Chin, Tiong Yap Choon, Ang Chin Tat, Wan Mohammad Khair-il Anuar Wan Ahmad (posthumous)

=== 2017 ===
- Public Service Division
  - Stephen Chung Hian Guan, Yogeesvaran Kumaraguru, Azam Baki, Siti Zauyah Mohd. Desa, Ramlan Ibrahim, Zohari Akob, Abdul Puhat Mat Nayan, Mohamad Shuhaime Abdul Rahman
- Local Government / Statutory Bodies Division
  - Azhari Rosman
- Private Sector / Association / Voluntary / Sports Division
  - Mohamad Nageeb Ahmad Abdul Wahab, Barry Tan Chong Liang, Yasmin Mahmood, Azih Muda, Krishnan Kunjan, Lee Chong Wei, Nicol Ann David, Tan Theng Hooi, Shigeharu Toda (honorary), Marcus Levon Karakashian (honorary)
- Military Division
  - Anuwi Hassan, Mohamad Roslan Mohamad Ramli
- Police Division
  - Muhammad Sabtu Osman, Mohd. Mokhtar Mohd. Shariff
- Political Organisations Division
  - Che Mohamad Zulkifly Jusoh, Irmohizam Ibrahim, Norjan Abdul Hamid, Loke Ah Hong, Sebastian Ting Chiew Yew, Ngan Yun Kiang, Ahmad Lai Bujang, Soh Chee Whye, Siringan Gubat Aliance, Ali Habeeb Rahman, Ling Chui Zhen, Ng Loi Tect, Khoo Soo Seang, S. Kanan G. Suppiah, Abdullah Hasnan Kamaruddin, Mohamed Rozai Shafian, Rosni Sohar, Liwan Lagang, Raman L. Muniandy, Periasamy Munisamy, Rawisandran Narayanan, Parameswaran Ganason, Makin Marcus Mojigoh, Wong Fung Kiang, Mutang Tagal, Chia Hui Yen, Woon See Chin, Shanmugam Gopala Krishnan

=== 2018 ===
- No appointments were made in 2018.

=== 2019 ===
- Public Service Division
  - Nor Azri Zulfakar, Siti Hamisah Tapsir, Siti Zainab Omar, Azhar Azizan Harun, Zulkifli Omar, Supang Lian, See Mee Chun, Zulkifli Mohamad Al-Bakri, Mohamed Elias Abu Bakar, Akbar Samon, Ahmad Sharifuddin Mohd. Asari
- Local Government / Statutory Bodies Division
  - Abdul Latif Mohmod, Wahid Razzaly, Ahmad Azri Abdul Hamid, Mohd. Azraai Kassim
- Private Sector / Association / Voluntary / Sports Division
  - Hamidin Mohd. Amin, Taufiq Yap Yun Hin, Lim Show Jin, Narayanan Kuppusamy, Khairuddin Abu Hassan, Chandran Rama Muthy
- Military Division
  - Kamalruzaman Mohd. Othman, Sheikh Mokhsin Sheikh Hassan, Khairul Anuar Yahya, Azizan Mohd. Delin, Abdul Halim Jalal, Rusli Ramli, Ya'akop Koming
- Police Division
  - Acryl Sani Abdullah Sani, Rosli Abdul Rahman, Iskandar Abdul Malik

== 2020s ==
=== 2020 ===
- Public Service Division
  - Muhammad Shahrul Ikram Yaakob, Habibah Abdul Rahim, Safar Untong, Ravinthran Paramaguru, Mohd. Rabin Basir, Lokman Hakim Ali, Nazran Muhammad, Jaul Samion, Mohd. Gazali Abas, Nik Azman Nik Abdul Majid
- Local Government / Statutory Bodies Division
  - Wan Mohd. Shaharir Wan Abdul Jalil
- Private Sector / Association / Voluntary / Sports Division
  - Abdul Rahman Sbri, Ahmad Fadzil Mohamad Hani, Normah Hanum Ibrahim, Low Gee Teong, Noor Zilan Mohamed Noor, Mohamed Salleh Bajuri, Muhammad Suhaimi Yahya
- Military Division
  - Aris Adi Tan Abdullah, Suhaimi Mohd. Zuki, Mohd. Nazir Mami, Ganesh Navaratnam, Mohd. Amin Muslan, Hasagaya Abdullah, Mohd. Ashgar Khan Goriman Khan
- Police Division
  - Mohamed Farid Abu Hassan, Abdul Rahim Jaafar, Huzir Mohamed, Zamri Yahya
