= Mayor of Kuala Lumpur =

Municipal office in Malaysia

- Datuk Bandar Kuala Lumpur
- Coat of arms of Kuala Lumpur
- Incumbent; Fadlun Mak Ujud since 15 November 2025
- Kuala Lumpur City Hall
- Style: Yang Berbahagia
- Member of: Kuala Lumpur City Advisory Board
- Reports to: Department of Federal Territories
- Residence: Kediaman Rasmi Datuk Bandar Kuala Lumpur; 21 Changkat Tunku, 50480 Kuala Lumpur
- Seat: Tingkat 28, Menara DBKL 1, Jalan Raja Laut, 50350 Kuala Lumpur
- Appointer: Yang di-Pertuan Agong
- Term length: Two years
- Constituting instrument: City of Kuala Lumpur Act 1971 [Act 59] Federal Capital Act 1960 [Act 190]
- Inaugural holder: Lokman Yusof
- Formation: 1 February 1972; 54 years ago
- Website: www.dbkl.gov.my

The Mayor of Kuala Lumpur (Malay: Datuk Bandar Kuala Lumpur) is the chief executive for the local government of Kuala Lumpur, the capital and largest city of Malaysia. Each year, the Mayor of Kuala Lumpur presents the Kuala Lumpur city budget to the Kuala Lumpur City Hall. The mayor is charged with managing an annual budget of MYR 2.905 billion (as of 2018). The role is apolitical and is appointed by the Minister of Federal Territories, with consent from the Yang di-Pertuan Agong.

City councillors (Ahli Majlis) and mayors (Datuk Bandar) in Malaysia before 1965 used to be directly elected by the populace. In 1960, the passage of the Federal Capital Act led to the deterioration of local electoral power, replacing existing elected positions with an appointed commissioner and advisory board. On 2 March 1965, all local government elections across the country were suspended, with the official justification being the preservation of national security due to Konfrontasi. Local elections have never resumed since.

== Chronological list ==
=== Appointed mayors of Kuala Lumpur ===
As 7 September 2026, the city has been led by 16 mayors. The previous mayors are listed as below:

No.	Portrait	Mayor	Term of office		
No.	Portrait	Mayor	Took office	Left office	Time in office
1.		Tan Sri Dato'; Lokman Yusof (1910–1972)	1 February 1972	13 May 1972	103 days
2.		Tan Sri; Yaacob Abdul Latiff (1918–1985)	1 July 1972	31 October 1981	9 years, 123 days
3.		Tan Sri Dato' Haji; Elyas Omar (1936–2018)	1 November 1981	17 September 1992	10 years, 322 days
4.		Dato' Dr. Mazlan Ahmad (1943–2018)	17 November 1992	12 December 1995	3 years, 26 days
5.		Tan Sri Dato'; Kamaruzzaman Shariff (b.1941)	13 December 1995	13 December 2001	6 years, 1 day
6.		Datuk Haji; Mohmad Shaid Mohd Taufek (b.1947)	14 December 2001	13 December 2004	3 years, 0 days
7.		Dato' Haji; Ruslin Hasan (b.1950)	14 December 2004	13 December 2006	2 years, 0 days
8.		Datuk Seri; Ab Hakim Borhan (b.1951)	14 December 2006	13 December 2008	2 years, 0 days
9.		Tan Sri; Ahmad Fuad Ismail (b.1953)	14 December 2008	13 July 2012	3 years, 213 days
10.		Tan Sri Haji; Ahmad Phesal Talib (b.1954)	18 July 2012	15 July 2015	2 years, 363 days
11.		Tan Sri Haji; Mhd Amin Nordin Abdul Aziz (b.1955)	18 July 2015	30 September 2018	3 years, 75 days
12.		Datuk Seri; Nor Hisham Ahmad Dahlan (b.1957)	2 October 2018	30 September 2020	1 year, 365 days
13.		Datuk Seri; Mahadi Che Ngah (b.1959)	1 October 2020	31 March 2023	2 years, 182 days
14.		Datuk Seri; Kamarulzaman Mat Salleh (b.1964)	17 April 2023	14 August 2024	1 year, 120 days
15.		Dato' Seri; Maimunah Mohd Sharif (b.1961)	15 August 2024	14 November 2025	1 year, 92 days
16.		Dato' Haji; Fadlun Mak Ujud (b.1967)	15 November 2025	Incumbent	297 days
