= SMK Yaacob Latiff =

Secondary school in Kuala Lumpur, Malaysia

- Kuala Lumpur, Federal Territory; Malaysia

Information
- Type: Government secondary schools
- Form: 1-5
- Affiliations: Malaysia Ministry Of Education

Sekolah Menengah Kebangsaan Yaacob Latiff or SMK Yaacob Latiff (SMKYL), is a secondary school in Kuala Lumpur, Malaysia. This school is located at Lorong Peel off Jalan Peel at Taman Maluri.

== History ==
Originally established by the De La Salle Brothers in 1948-1954 as La Salle School, Peel Road to cope with the spillover of enrolment from St. John's Institution, the school was renamed after the second Lord Mayor of Kuala Lumpur (Malay: Datuk Bandar Kuala Lumpur), Tan Sri Yaacob Latiff when management and ownership was transferred to the Ministry of Education 45 years after its founding in 1993-.
