= Order of Loyalty to the Crown of Malaysia =

Malaysian federal award

Awarded by the King of Malaysia
- Type: State Order
- Established: 15 April 1966
- Ribbon: Blue with red edge stripes.
- Eligibility: Commander: Civil servants
- Awarded for: Meritorious service to the country
- Status: Currently constituted
- Sovereign: Sultan Ibrahim, King of Malaysia
- Grades: Grand Commander (SSM); Commander (PSM); Companion (JSM)
- Post-nominals: S.S.M. / P.S.M. / J.S.M.

Statistics
- First induction: 1966
- Last induction: 2024
- Total inductees: 52 Grand Commanders; 1,081 Commanders; 2,715 Companions; 20 Honorary Grand Commanders; 123 Honorary Commanders; 44 Honorary Companions

Precedence
- Next (higher): Order of the Defender of the Realm
- Next (lower): Order of Merit
- Ribbon of the Order

The Most Esteemed Order of Loyalty to the Crown of Malaysia (Malay: Darjah Yang Mulia Setia Mahkota Malaysia) is a Malaysian federal award presented for meritorious service to the country and awarded by the sovereign.

The order was instituted on 15 April 1966 and gazetted on 30 June 1966. The order has three ranks.

== Order ranks ==
Ribbon pattern of the ranks
S.S.M.	P.S.M.	J.S.M.

=== Grand Commander ===
The highest class of the order is the Grand Commander of the Order of Loyalty to the Crown of Malaysia (S.S.M.) (Malay: Seri Setia Mahkota Malaysia).

The award recipient receives the title Tun and his wife Toh Puan.

The number of awards conferred is limited to 25 living recipients only at any time. The number does not include foreign citizens who receive it as an honorary award.

The fourteen-pointed star and the collar is made from silver. The badge suspends from the centre of the collar and is similar, but smaller, to the star. The riband is navy blue and has red stripes on the outer edges. The end of the riband is tied with a ribbon.

=== Commander ===
Commander of the Order of Loyalty to the Crown of Malaysia (P.S.M.) (Malay: Panglima Setia Mahkota Malaysia). is the second class of this order.

The recipient of this award receives the title Tan Sri and his wife Puan Sri.

This award was limited to 250 living recipients only at any time, excluding foreign citizens who receive it as an honorary award.

The badge and the design of the star are similar to that of the Grand Commander but smaller. The riband has a navy blue background and on both the edges are red stripes. In the centre are red stripes (broad) flanked by narrow ones.

=== Companion ===
The lowest class of the order is the Companion of the Order of Loyalty to the Crown of Malaysia (J.S.M.) (Malay: Johan Setia Mahkota Malaysia).

Only 800 living recipients are conferred this award at any time, excluding foreign citizens who receive it as an honorary award. It does not carry any title.

The badge of the Order has the same design and make as that of the Grand Cordon and the Commander. However, it is smaller with a radius of 2¼ inches. The badge suspends from a riband measuring 1¾ inches wide. It has a navy blue background and red stripes on both the edges. The badge is worn around the neck.

== Recipients list ==
Official source

=== Grand Commanders (S.S.M.) ===
The grand commander receives the title Tun and his wife Toh Puan.

- 1966: Ismail Abdul Rahman
- 1967: Tan Siew Sin
- 1967: V. T. Sambanthan
- 1968: Syed Sheh Barakbah
- 1970: Azmi Mohamed
- 1973: Mohamed Salleh Ismael
- 1975: Mohamed Suffian Mohamed Hashim
- 1976: Rahah Noah
- 1979: Omar Ong Yoke Lin
- 1980: Ismail Mohamed Ali
- 1981: Jugah Barieng
- 1982: Syed Nasir Ismail
- 1983: Raja Azlan Shah
- 1985: Salleh Abas
- 1987: Ahmad Zaidi Adruce
- 1987: Syed Ahmad Shahabuddin
- 1989: Abdul Hamid Omar
- 1990: Suhailah Noah
- 1991: Daim Zainuddin
- 1991: Lim Chong Eu
- 1992: Raja Mohar
- 1993: Mohammed Hanif Omar
- 1995: Ghafar Baba
- 1997: Eusoff Chin
- 1998: Mohamed Zahir Ismail
- 2000: Ibrahim Ismail
- 2001: Sulaiman Ninam Shah
- 2002: Mohamed Dzaiddin Abdullah
- 2003: Abdullah Mohd Salleh
- 2003: Fatimah Hashim
- 2003: Siti Hasmah Mohamad Ali
- 2004: Ling Liong Sik
- 2005: Ahmad Fairuz Abdul Halim
- 2005: Ghazali Shafie
- 2006: Musa Hitam
- 2008: Abdul Hamid Mohamad
- 2008: Ahmad Sarji Abdul Hamid
- 2008: Lim Keng Yaik
- 2009: Endon Mahmood
- 2009: Jeanne Abdullah
- 2009: Zaki Azmi
- 2010: Azizan Zainul Abidin
- 2011: Abdullah Ayub
- 2012: Arifin Zakaria
- 2017: Michael Chen Wing Sum
- 2017: Md Raus Sharif
- 2017: Samy Vellu
- 2020: Tengku Maimun Tuan Mat
- 2020: Arshad Ayub
- 2020: Richard Malanjum
- 2021: Raja Muhammad Alias Raja Muhammad Ali
- 2022: Mohamed Hashim Mohd Ali
- 2026: Wan Ahmad Farid Wan Salleh

=== Commanders (P.S.M.) ===
The commander receives the title Tan Sri and his wife Puan Sri.

- 1966: Abdul Aziz Yeop
- 1966: Abdul Hamid Bidin
- 1966: Abdul Hamid Mustapha
- 1966: Abdul Kadir Shamsuddin
- 1966: C. M. Hashim
- 1966: Foo Yin Chiew
- 1966: Hussain Mohd Sidek
- 1966: Khoo Teck Puat
- 1966: Tan Seng Kee
- 1966: Yaacob Abdul Latiff
- 1967: Jamal Abdul Latiff
- 1967: Mohamed Suffian Mohamed Hashim
- 1967: Nik Daud Nik Mat
- 1967: Ong Hock Thye
- 1967: Raja Mohar
- 1967: Tuanku Bujang
- 1967: Zaiton Ibrahim Ahmad
- 1968: Abdul Jalil Hassan
- 1968: Dominic Vendargon
- 1968: Gan Teck Yeow
- 1968: Low Yat
- 1968: Roland Koh Peck Chiang
- 1968: Syed Zahiruddin
- 1968: Yahya Mohd Seth
- 1968: Yusoff Ibrahim
- 1969: Mubin Sheppard
- 1969: Ismail Khan
- 1969: Mohamed Jamil
- 1970: Abdul Aziz Mohd Zain
- 1970: Ali Hassan
- 1970: Donald Stephens
- 1970: Johari Mohd Daud
- 1970: Lim Leong Seng
- 1970: Mohd Ariff Darus
- 1970: Philip Kuok Hock Khee
- 1970: Raja Zainal Raja Suleiman
- 1970: Sarwan Singh Gill
- 1970: Sheikh Abdullah Sheikh Abu Bakar
- 1970: T. J. Danaraj
- 1970: Wan Hamzah Wan Mohd
- 1971: Abu Bakar Samad Mohd Noor
- 1971: Ong Hock Sim
- 1971: Lokman Yusof
- 1971: Mohamed Salleh Abas
- 1971: R. Sathiah
- 1971: Tengku Ngah Mohamed Tengku Sri Akar
- 1971: Ungku Nazaruddin Ungku Mohamed
- 1972: Raja Azlan Shah
- 1972: Hamzah Sendut
- 1972: Mohd Yatim Yahya
- 1972: S. M. Yong
- 1972: Sheikh Hussain Sheikh Mohamed
- 1973: Abdul Majid Ismail
- 1973: Chong Hon Nyan
- 1973: Gerunsin Lembat
- 1973: Ibrahim Ali
- 1973: Tengku Razaleigh Hamzah
- 1973: S. O. K. Ubaidulla
- 1974: Abdul Khalid Awang Osman
- 1974: Bhanubandhu Yugala
- 1974: Hamdan Sheikh Tahir
- 1974: Lee Yan Lian
- 1974: Lim Ching Hwa
- 1974: Mohd Ibrahim Basinau
- 1974: Mohd Rashdan Baba
- 1974: Richard Allan Lind
- 1974: Thong Yaw Hong
- 1974: William Tan Ho Choon
- 1975: Ainuddin Wahid
- 1975: Ibrahim Salleh
- 1975: Khoo Chong Kong
- 1975: Raja Aznam Raja Ahmad
- 1975: Wan Sulaiman Pawan Teh
- 1976: Abdullah Ayub
- 1976: Abu Zarim Omar
- 1976: Athi Nahappan
- 1976: Balachandra Chakkingal Sekhar
- 1976: John Gnanadickam Daniel
- 1976: Lee Boon Chim
- 1976: Mahfoz Khalid
- 1976: Mahmood Mohd Yunus
- 1976: Mohd Sany Abdul Ghaffar
- 1976: Muhammad Su'aut Tahir
- 1976: Osman Talib
- 1976: Yacob Hitam
- 1977: Anuwar Mahmud
- 1977: Daiman Jamaluddin
- 1977: M. S. Sundaram
- 1977: Mohd Hassan Abdul Wahab
- 1977: Murad Ahmad
- 1977: Nasruddin Mohamed
- 1977: V. M. Hutson
- 1977: Yeh Pao Tzu
- 1978: Abdul Aziz Zakaria
- 1978: C. Sinnadurai
- 1978: Chang Min Tat
- 1978: Hashim Aman
- 1978: Zainon Munshi Sulaiman
- 1978: Kishenchand T. Jethanand
- 1978: Lee Loy Seng
- 1978: Lee Siew Yee
- 1978: Mohd Ali
- 1978: Mohd Ghazali Mohd Seth
- 1978: Mohd Osman Samsudin Cassim
- 1978: Raja Ahmad Noordin Raja Shahbuddin
- 1978: Thomas Joseph Jayasuriya
- 1978: Zainal Abidin Abas
- 1978: Zakaria Mohd Ali
- 1979: Ahmad Noordin Zakaria
- 1979: Chong Kok Lim
- 1979: Ganapathy Kalyana Rama Iyer
- 1979: Ishak Pateh Akhir
- 1979: Lee Siow Meng
- 1979: Lim Goh Tong
- 1979: Lim Taik Choon
- 1979: Murad Mohd Noor
- 1979: Ong Guan Bee
- 1979: Raja Muhammad Alias Raja Muhammad
- 1979: Syed Ahmad Shahabuddin
- 1979: Syed Othman Ali
- 1979: Panieng Karntarat
- 1980: Abdul Kadir Talib
- 1980: Abdul Rahman Abdul Jalal
- 1980: Arshad Ayub
- 1980: Chin Fung Kee
- 1980: Halaluddin Mohamed Ishak
- 1980: Ibrahim Abdul Manan
- 1980: John G. Savarimuthu
- 1980: Lim Eng
- 1980: Mohamad Bakri
- 1980: Mohd Amin Osman
- 1980: R. P. Pillay
- 1980: Suffian Koroh
- 1980: Tan Chee Khoon
- 1981: Abdul Hamid Omar
- 1981: Abu Talib Othman
- 1981: Sim Kheng Hong
- 1981: Jamil Mohd Jan
- 1981: Kamarul Ariffin Mohd Yassin
- 1981: Mansor Mohd Noor
- 1981: Mohd Yusof Abdul Rahman
- 1981: Tan Yuet Foh
- 1981: Zain Hashim
- 1981: Zainal Abidin Sulong
- 1982: Abdul Aziz Taha
- 1982: Awang Had Salleh
- 1982: Benedict Stephens
- 1982: Ibrahim Mohamed
- 1982: Lim Thiam Leong
- 1982: Low Keng Huat
- 1982: Muhammad Yusoff Muhammad Yunus
- 1982: Rozhan Kuntom
- 1982: Sallehuddin Mohamed
- 1982: Saw Huat Lye
- 1982: Syed Hassan Aidid
- 1983: Abdul Hamid Egoh
- 1983: Ling Beng Siew
- 1983: Chelliah Selvarajah
- 1983: Hashim Yeop Abdullah Sani
- 1983: Shariff Ahmad
- 1983: Sheikh Abdul Mohsein Salleh
- 1983: Teh Ewe Lim
- 1983: Teh Hong Piow
- 1983: Tengku Ibrahim Sultan Abu Bakar
- 1983: V. Jayaratnam
- 1984: Abang Marzuki Noor
- 1984: Abdul Rahim Tak
- 1984: Basir Ismail
- 1984: Eusoffe Abdoolcader
- 1984: Muhammad Azmi Kamaruddin
- 1984: Othman Abdul Malek
- 1984: Raja Khalid Raja Harun
- 1984: Sulaiman Ninam Shah
- 1984: Tengku Meriam Sultan Ahmad Shah
- 1984: Wee Boon Ping
- 1984: Tien Kuang Wen
- 1984: Zain Azraai Zainal Abidin
- 1985: Abdul Khalid Sahan
- 1985: Mohd Ghazali Che Mat
- 1985: N. S. Maniam
- 1985: Wan Hamzah Wan Muhammad Salleh
- 1985: Wong Yoke Meng
- 1985: Yeoh Tiong Lay
- 1986: Alwi Jantan
- 1986: Khoo Kay Peng
- 1986: Radin Soenarno Radin Soenario
- 1986: Syed Agil Barakbah
- 1986: Too Chee Chew
- 1987: Ahmad Mohamed Ibrahim
- 1987: Ahmad Yusof
- 1987: Azizan Zainul Abidin
- 1987: Hashim Mohd Ali
- 1987: Ishak Tadin
- 1987: Jaffar Abdul
- 1987: Jaffar Hussein
- 1987: Sunthorn Kongsompong
- 1987: Wong Tok Chai
- 1988: Abdul Rahman Arshad
- 1988: Abdul Wahab Nawi
- 1988: Azman Hashim
- 1988: Loh Boon Siew
- 1988: Md Jalaluddin Zainuddin
- 1988: Mohamed Ngah Said
- 1988: Mohamed Yaacob
- 1988: Muhyiddin Yassin
- 1988: Wan Mokhtar Ahmad
- 1988: Yaacob Mat Zain
- 1988: Yahya Abdul Wahab
- 1989: Abdul Aziz Abdul Rahman
- 1989: Abdul Hamid Abdul Rahman
- 1989: Abdul Taib Mahmud
- 1989: Arumugam Packiri
- 1989: Azahari Md. Taib
- 1989: Eric Chia Eng Hock
- 1989: Pasamanickam Ganapathy
- 1989: Geh Ik Cheong
- 1989: Mohd Khalil Yaakob
- 1989: Muhammad Muhammad Taib
- 1989: Nayan Ariffin
- 1989: Ramon Navaratnam
- 1989: Ramli Ngah Talib
- 1989: Shamsuddin Abdul Kadir
- 1989: Talha Mohamad Hashim
- 1989: Wong Chik Lim
- 1989: Wong Kum Choon
- 1989: Sunthorn Kongsompong
- 1990: Abdul Rahim Thamby Chik
- 1990: Abdul Rahim Mohd Noor
- 1990: Bujang Mohd Nor
- 1990: Elyas Omar
- 1990: Harun Mahmud Hashim
- 1990: P. Ramlee
- 1990: Sakaran Dandai
- 1990: Tunku Ahmad Tunku Yahaya
- 1990: Wan Sidek Wan Abdul Rahman
- 1991: Abdullah Abdul Rahman
- 1991: Che Ani Arope
- 1991: Cheng Heng Jem
- 1991: Gunn Chit Tuan
- 1991: Hamdan Sirat
- 1991: Khoo Kay Por
- 1991: Lin Hai Moh
- 1991: Mahmud Taib
- ~~1991: Mohd Isa Abdul Samad~~ (revoked 8 June 2026)
- 1991: Mustafa Abdul Jabar
- 1991: Osman Aroff
- 1991: Razali Ismail
- 1991: Vincent Tan Chee Yioun
- 1991: Zainol Mahmood
- 1992: Abdul Samad Ismail
- 1992: Ahmad Kamil Jaafar
- 1992: Chan Choong Tak
- 1992: Hanafiah Ahmad
- 1992: Lim Geok Chan
- 1992: Looi Ah Kaw
- 1992: Low Yow Chuan
- 1992: Mohd Abu Bakar Mohd Noor
- 1992: Mohd Sheriff Mohd Kassim
- 1992: Mohd Yusof Hashim
- 1992: Nasrudin Bahari
- 1992: Wan Azmi Wan Hamzah
- 1992: Tunku Imran Tuanku Ja'afar
- 1992: Tunku Shahriman Tunku Sulaiman
- 1992: Wan Abdul Rahman Wan Yaacob
- 1992: Yusoff Mohamed
- 1992: Zulkifli Mahmood
- 1993: Abdul Rashid Hussain
- 1993: Abu Bakar Suleiman
- 1993: Ahmad Mustafa Babjee
- 1993: Ahmad Sabki Jahidin
- 1993: Ali Abul Hassan Sulaiman
- 1993: Borhan Ahmad
- 1993: Chang Joo Chiang
- 1993: Edgar Joseph Jr.
- 1993: Ismail Hussein
- 1993: Lee Shin Cheng
- 1993: Mohd Eusoff Chin
- 1993: Mohd Othman Yob Abdullah
- 1993: Augustine Ong Soon Hock
- 1993: Tharmalingam Arunasalam
- 1993: Wong Soon Kai
- 1993: Yom Ahmad Ngah Ahmad
- 1994: Abdul Hamid Pawanteh
- 1994: Abdul Rahim Din
- 1994: Ahmad Farouk Isahak
- 1994: Ibrahim Menudin
- 1994: Mohamed Noordin Hassan
- 1994: Mohd Shariff Ishak
- 1994: Musa Mohamad
- 1994: Omar Abdul Rahman
- 1994: Quek Leng Chan
- 1994: Shahrizaila Abdullah
- 1994: Simon Sipaun
- 1994: Ting Pek Khiing
- 1994: Vadiveloo Govindasamy
- 1994: Wan Mohd Zahid Mohd Noordin
- 1995: Abdul Kader Talip
- 1995: Aboo Samah Aboo Bakar
- 1995: Alfred Jabu Numpang
- 1995: Anuar Zainal Abidin
- 1995: Chen Lip Keong
- 1995: Clifford Francis Herbert
- 1995: Devaki Ayathurai Krishnan
- 1995: Halim Saad
- 1995: Kamaruzzaman Shariff
- 1995: Koh Tsu Koon
- 1995: Lamin Mohd Yunus
- 1995: Lim Kok Wing
- 1995: Lim Yan Hai
- 1995: Melan Abdullah
- 1995: Shoib Ahmad
- 1995: Stephen Kalong Ningkan
- 1995: Tajudin Ramli
- 1996: Ahmad Azizuddin Zainal Abidin
- 1996: Anwar A. Malik
- 1996: Kontek Kamariah Ahmad
- 1996: Husein Ahmad
- 1996: Jeffrey Cheah Fook Ling
- 1996: K. R. Somasundram
- 1996: Kamsiah Abdul Majid
- 1996: Kasitah Gaddam
- 1996: Mohamed Tahir Abdul Majid
- 1996: Mohtar Abdullah
- 1996: Muhammad Khatib Abdul Hamid
- 1996: Ngan Ching Wen
- 1996: Peter Lo Sui Yin
- 1996: Samsuri Arshad
- 1996: Shafie Abdullah
- 1996: Stephen Yong Kuet Tze
- 1996: Tan Kok Ping
- 1996: Yahaya Ahmad
- 1997: Abdullah Sanusi Ahmad
- 1997: Ahmad Mohd Don
- 1997: Asmat Kamaludin
- 1997: Bernard Giluk Dompok
- 1997: Francis Yeoh Sock Ping
- 1997: Karnail Singh Nijhar
- 1997: Lee Kim Yew
- 1997: Mazlan Ahmad
- 1997: Mohd Hassan Marican
- 1997: Nik Mohamad Nik Yaakob
- 1997: Noordin Sopiee
- 1997: Redzuan Salim
- 1997: Salma Ismail
- 1997: Sanusi Junid
- 1997: Syed Kechik Syed Mohamed
- 1997: Teong Teck Leng
- 1998: Abdul Aziz Ismail
- 1998: Abdul Aziz Tapa
- 1998: Abdul Khalid Ibrahim
- 1998: Ahmad Johan
- 1998: Ajit Singh
- 1998: Azizan Husain
- 1998: Chan Ah Chye
- 1998: Cheah Cheng Kooi
- 1998: Hamid Bugo
- 1998: Jamilus Hussein
- 1998: Johari Mat
- 1998: Khalil Jamalul
- 1998: Low Keng Seng
- 1998: Mohd Saleh Sulong
- 1998: Norian Mai
- 1998: Omar Ibrahim
- 1998: SM Nasimuddin SM Amin
- 1998: Soong Siew Hoong
- 1998: Syed Jalaludin Syed Salim
- 1998: Tharumagnanam Thambiah
- 1998: Tunku Dara Naquiah Tuanku Ja'afar
- 1998: Tunku Osman Ahmad
- 1999: Abdul Ghani Gilong
- 1999: Abdullah Ahmad
- 1999: Ahmad Razali Mohd Ali
- 1999: Ahmad Tajuddin Ali
- 1999: Aris Osman
- 1999: Chong Siew Fai
- 1999: Joseph Kurup
- 1999: Khalid Abdullah
- 1999: Mohd Ramli Kushairi
- 1999: Mohd Zahidi Zainuddin
- 1999: Mustapha Kamal Abu Bakar
- 1999: R. P. Lingam
- 1999: Samsudin Osman
- 1999: Teo Soo Cheng
- 1999: Tiong Hiew King
- 1999: Tunku Abdullah
- 1999: Wan Adnan Ismail
- 1999: William Chek Lin Kwai
- 2000: Abu Sahid Mohamed
- 2000: Ahmad Saruji Che Rose
- 2000: Ahmad Zaharudin Idrus
- 2000: Alexander Lee Yu Lung
- 2000: Chong Chin Shoong
- 2000: Gnanalingam Gunanathlingam
- 2000: George Chan Hong Nam
- 2000: Halim Mohammad
- 2000: James Peter Chin Soon Swee
- 2000: Kuek Ho Yao
- 2000: Lal Chand Vohrah
- 2000: Lau Ban Tin
- 2000: Lau Gek Poh
- 2000: Lee Kim Sai
- 2000: Lim Cheng Ean
- 2000: Lim Guan Teik
- 2000: Mahalingam Muthukrishnen
- 2000: Megat Junid Megat Ayub
- 2000: Mohamed Basir Ahmad
- 2000: Mohamed Rahmat
- 2000: Mohamed Dzaiddin Abdullah
- 2000: Mohan Swami
- 2000: Mohd Razali Abdul Rahman
- 2000: Muhammad Ali Hashim
- 2000: Nor Mohamed Yakcop
- 2000: Nuraizah Abdul Hamid
- 2000: Othman Mohd Rijal
- 2000: Rozali Ismail
- 2000: Sabbaruddin Chik
- 2000: Sulaiman Daud
- 2000: Syed Mokhtar Albukhary
- 2000: Tan Lai Kim
- 2000: Tee Hock Seng
- 2000: Tengku Mahaleel Tengku Ariff
- 2000: Zaki Azmi
- 2001: Abdul Hamid Othman
- 2001: Abdul Kadir Mohamad
- 2001: Abu Bakar Abdul Jamal
- 2001: Amin Shah Omar Shah
- 2001: Hanafiah Hussain
- 2001: Lim Cheng Pow
- 2001: Low Nam Hui
- 2001: Mahadevan Mahalingam
- 2001: Md Hashim Hussein
- 2001: Mohd Jamil Johari
- 2001: Othman Merican
- 2001: P. Alagendra
- 2001: S. M. Salim
- 2001: Samsudin Hitam
- 2001: Steve Lip Kiong
- 2001: Syed Abbas Alhabshee
- 2001: Tan Beng Tong
- 2001: Tan Hua Choon
- 2001: Zeti Akhtar Aziz
- 2002: Ab. Rahman Omar
- 2002: Abu Hassan Othman
- 2002: Ahmad Fairuz Abdul Halim
- 2002: Chua Hock Chin
- 2002: Engku Ibrahim Engku Ngah
- 2002: Hashim Meon
- 2002: Hasmy Agam
- 2002: Hew See Tong
- 2002: Jamaluddin Ahmad Damanhuri
- 2002: Lee Lam Thye
- 2002: Lim Kok Thay
- 2002: Michael Chen Wing Sum
- 2002: Mohamad Taha Arif
- 2002: Mohd Yusoff Md Nor
- 2002: Muhammad Radzi Mansor
- 2002: Nik Ibrahim Nik Ahmad Kamil
- 2002: Pandikar Amin Mulia
- 2002: Tai Sing Chii
- 2003: Ab. Rashid Ab. Rahman
- 2003: Abdul Gani Patail
- 2003: Abdul Halil Abd. Mutalif
- 2003: Abdul Majid Khan
- 2003: Abdullah Ali
- 2003: Ahmad Fuzi Abdul Razak
- 2003: Anuwar Ali
- 2003: Chai Kin Kong
- 2003: Lodin Wok Kamaruddin
- 2003: Gan Kong Seng
- 2003: Haidar Mohamed Noor
- 2003: Hamdan Mohamad
- 2003: Hari Narayanan Govindasamy
- 2003: Ng Lay Swee
- 2003: Sak Cheng Lum
- 2003: Tan Chee Sing
- 2003: Ting Chew Peh
- 2003: Yahya Awang
- 2003: Zaini Omar
- 2003: Zainol Abidin Abd. Rashid
- 2003: Zaleha Ismail
- 2004: Abdul Rafie Mahat
- 2004: Abdul Rahim Mohamad
- 2004: Abdul Rashid Abdul Manaf
- 2004: Abdul Razak Ramli
- 2004: Abdullah Mohd Tahir
- 2004: Abu Hassan Omar
- 2004: Adam Kadir
- 2004: Chong Kah Kiat
- 2004: Hadenan Abdul Jalil
- 2004: Hamad Kama Piah Che Othman
- 2004: Lim Ah Lek
- 2004: Md Desa Pachi
- 2004: Mohamed Hashim Ahmad Makaruddin
- 2004: Saleha Mohd Ali
- 2004: Yusof Basirun
- 2004: Zainul Ariff Hussain
- 2005: Abdul Malek Ahmad
- 2005: Abi Musa Asa'ari Mohamed Nor
- 2005: Adzmi Abdul Wahab
- 2005: Leo Moggie Irok
- 2005: Ambrin Buang
- 2005: Aseh Che Mat
- 2005: Che Onn Ismail
- 2005: Dol Ramli
- 2005: Ghazzali Sheikh Abd. Khalid
- 2005: James Alfred A. David
- 2005: Khalid Ahmad Sulaiman
- 2005: Kua Sian Kooi
- 2005: Law Hieng Ding
- 2005: Mazlan Nordin
- 2005: Md Nor Md Yusof
- 2005: Megat Zaharuddin Megat Mohd Nor
- 2005: Mohd Ibrahim Mohd Zain
- 2005: Mohd Zuki Kamaluddin
- 2005: Mohd Sedek Mohd Ali
- 2005: Siti Norma Yaakob
- 2005: Soh Thiam Hong
- 2005: Subhan Jasmon
- 2005: Tan Tiong Hian
- 2005: Wong See Wah
- 2005: Yahaya Ibrahim
- 2006: Abdul Aziz Zainal
- 2006: Abdul Aziz Mohd Yusof
- 2006: Abdul Razak Alias
- 2006: Ampikiapakan S. Kandiah
- 2006: Darshan Singh Gurdial Singh
- 2006: Ilyas Din
- 2006: Ismail Adam
- 2006: Izzuddin Dali
- 2006: Khalid Ramli
- 2006: Lau Yin Pin
- 2006: Liew Kee Sin
- 2006: Marzuki Mohammad Noor
- 2006: Mohamed Ismail Merican
- 2006: Mohd Kamal Hassan
- 2006: Mohd Sidek Hassan
- 2006: Musa Hassan
- 2006: Nik Ismail Nik Mohamed
- 2006: Pheng Yin Huah
- 2006: Syed Zainol Anwar Jamalullail
- 2006: Tan Kay Hock
- 2007: Abdul Aziz Husain
- 2007: Abdul Kadir Sheikh Fadzir
- 2007: Abu Zahar Ujang
- 2007: Ahmad Nordin Md Amin
- 2007: Asiah Abu Samah
- 2007: Azizan Ariffin
- 2007: Chai Yu Lan
- 2007: Chin Fook Weng
- 2007: Rosemary Chow Poh Kheng
- 2007: Eugenio Antonio da Luz Campos
- 2007: Gajaraj Munusamy Dhanarajan
- 2007: Gnananpandythan Muthandi
- 2007: Kumaran Karunagaran
- 2007: Thanabalasingam Karalasingam
- 2007: Lau Tuang Nguang
- 2007: Lim Gait Tong
- 2007: Lim Wee Chai
- 2007: Mohamad Noor Abdul Rahim
- 2007: Mohamed Zain Shamsuddin
- 2007: Mohamed Mansor Feteh Din
- 2007: Mohamed Salleh Mohamed Yasin
- 2007: Mohd Ariffin Mohd Yusuf
- 2007: Mohd Zulkifli Mohd Ghazali
- 2007: Mohd Najib Abdul Aziz
- 2007: Muhammad Ismail Jamaluddin
- 2007: Napsiah Omar
- 2007: Ninian Mogan Lourdenadin
- 2007: Nordin Kardi
- 2007: Ramlan Mohamed Ali
- 2007: Rastam Mohd Isa
- 2007: Richard Malanjum
- 2007: Robert Phang Miow Sin
- 2007: Syed Mohd Yusof Syed Nasir
- 2007: Tajudin Ali
- 2007: Tong Yoke Kim
- 2007: Yong Poh Kon
- 2007: Zulkurnain Awang
- 2008: Abdul Rahman Mamat
- 2008: Ahmad Othman Merican
- 2008: Alauddin Mohd Sheriff
- 2008: Amirsham Abdul Aziz
- 2008: Annuar Musa
- 2008: Azman Mokhtar
- 2008: Chan Kong Choy
- 2008: Chua Ma Yu
- 2008: Dzulkifli Abdul Razak
- 2008: Sheikh Ghazali Abdul Rahman
- 2008: Syaikh Ismail Muhamad
- 2008: Ismail Omar
- 2008: Kamal Salih
- 2008: Khoo Kay Kim
- 2008: Kok Onn
- 2008: Lim Ewe Jin
- 2008: Mazidah Abdul Majid
- 2008: Megat Najmuddin Megat Khas
- 2008: Mohamed Jawhar Hassan
- 2008: Mohd Munir Abdul Majid
- 2008: Muhammad Rais Abdul Karim
- 2008: Murphy Nicholas Xavier Pakiam
- 2008: Ng Teck Fong
- 2008: Prince Guneratnam
- 2008: Rajandram Chellapah
- 2008: Sulaiman Mahbob
- 2008: Sulaiman Sujak
- 2008: Tay Ah Lek
- 2008: Wan Abdul Aziz Wan Abdullah
- 2008: Yap Suan Chee
- 2009: Abdul Aziz Jaafar
- 2009: Abdul Aziz Mohamad
- 2009: Ahmad Ramli Mohd Nor
- 2009: Alimuddin Mohd Dom
- 2009: Ampong Puyon
- 2009: Arifin Zakaria
- 2009: Azlan Mohd Zainol
- 2009: Bashir Ahmad Abdul Majid
- 2009: Chan Sau Lai
- 2009: Faizah Mohd Tahir
- 2009: Gurdial Singh Gill
- 2009: Harussani Zakaria
- 2009: Hassan Azhari
- 2009: Herman Luping
- 2009: Ibrahim Abu Shah
- 2009: Ibrahim Lembut
- 2009: Jemilah Mahmood
- 2009: Ravindran Kutty Krishnan
- 2009: Kam Woon Wah
- 2009: Kamal Mohamed Hashim Che Din
- 2009: Lau Hieng Wui
- 2009: Leong Hoy Kum
- 2009: Liew Yun Fah
- 2009: Lim Bah
- 2009: Lim Kang Yew
- 2009: Mohd Shahrom Nordin
- 2009: Mohd Yusof Hitam
- 2009: Mustafa Mansur
- 2009: Nik Hashim Nik Abdul Rahman
- 2009: Raja Arshad Raja Tun Uda
- 2009: Salleh Mohd Nor
- 2009: Sharifah Hapsah Syed Hasan
- 2009: Syed Azman Syed Ibrahim
- 2009: Ta Kin Yan
- 2009: Tan Ming Swee
- 2009: Yap Yong Seong
- 2009: Zainuddin Maidin
- 2009: Zarinah Sameehah Anwar
- 2010: Abd Razak Abd Latiff
- 2010: Abdul Aziz Shamsuddin
- 2010: Abdul Rashid Abdul Rahman
- 2010: Abdul Shukor Abdullah
- 2010: Abdul Shukor Husin
- 2010: Adenan Satem
- 2010: Andrew Liew Sui Fatt
- 2010: Andrew Sheng Len Tao
- 2010: Cecil Wilbert Mohanaraj Abraham
- 2010: Fong Chan Onn
- 2010: Hasmah Abdullah
- 2010: James Foong Cheng Yuen
- 2010: Jegathesan Manikavasagam
- 2010: Koo Yuen Kim
- 2010: Kuan Yong Kuan
- 2010: Lau Cho Kun
- 2010: Lee Oi Hian
- 2010: Lim Kim Hong
- 2010: Lim Soon Peng
- 2010: Lim Tong Yong
- 2010: Ling Chiong Ho
- 2010: Low Boon Eng
- 2010: Marimuthu Thangaveloo
- 2010: Tajol Rosli Mohd Ghazali
- 2010: Mohd Ghazali Mohd Yusoff
- 2010: Mohd Noor Ismail
- 2010: Mohd Yunus Mohd Tasi
- 2010: Nik Mustapha Raja Abdullah
- 2010: Robaayah Zambahari
- 2010: Rodzali Daud
- 2010: Tan Cheng Swee
- 2010: Tan King Tai
- 2010: Tang Yeam Soon
- 2010: Yaw Teck Seng
- 2010: Zulkefli A. Hassan
- 2010: Zulkefli Ahmad Makinudin
- 2011: Abdul Hamid Zainal Abidin
- 2011: Abdul Samad Alias
- 2011: Abdull Hamid Embong
- 2011: Abu Bakar Abdullah
- 2011: Ahmad Fuad Ismail
- 2011: Ainum Mohamed Saaid
- 2011: Leonard Linggi Jugah
- 2011: Anthony Francis Fernandes
- 2011: Cham Hak Lim
- 2011: Che Md Noor Mat Arshad
- 2011: Ghauth Jasmon
- 2011: Goh Teck Chai
- 2011: Hussin Ismail
- 2011: James Jemut Masing
- 2011: Lakshmanan Krishnan
- 2011: Lim Yew Loong
- 2011: Mahmood Adam
- 2011: Md Raus Sharif
- 2011: Mohd Azumi Mohamed
- 2011: Mohd Hussin Abd Hamid
- 2011: Mohd Nasir Mohd Ashraf
- 2011: Mohd Radzi Abdul Rahman
- 2011: Mohd Zaman Khan
- 2011: Omar Din Mawaidin
- 2011: P. G. Lim
- 2011: Rafiah Salim
- 2011: Rashpal Singh Jesawant Singh
- 2011: Ridzwan Abu Bakar
- 2011: Syed Muhammad Naquib al-Attas
- 2011: Tan Boon Seng
- 2011: Tee Tiam Lee
- 2011: Tengku Azlan
- 2011: Tunku Sallehuddin
- 2011: Wan Abu Bakar Omar
- 2011: William Mawan Ikom
- 2011: Yuen Yuet Leng
- 2011: Zulkifeli Mohd Zin
- 2012: Abd. Ghafar Mahmud
- 2012: Abd. Rahman Ismail
- 2012: Abdul Aziz Abdul Rahman
- 2012: Abdul Ghani Abdul Aziz
- 2012: Abdul Ghani Minhat
- 2012: Abdul Majid Md Noor
- 2012: Azman Shah Harun
- 2012: Badruddin Amiruldin
- 2012: Fng Ah Seng
- 2012: Goh Ming Choon
- 2012: Habib Mohammed Shah
- 2012: Hamidon Ali
- 2012: Ismail Hassan
- 2012: Khalid Abu Bakar
- 2012: Law Tien Seng
- 2012: Lim Kang Hoo
- 2012: Michelle Yeoh Choo Kheng
- 2012: Mohamad Morshidi Abdul Ghani
- 2012: Mohamed Azman Yahya
- 2012: Mohd Shukor Mahfar
- 2012: Omar Md Hashim
- 2012: Ong Leong Huat
- 2012: Onn Mahmud
- 2012: Rahmat Abu Bakar
- 2012: Shamsul Azhar Abbas
- 2012: Shahrir Abdul Samad
- 2012: Stephen Voon Chee Keong
- 2012: Subramaniam Sinniah
- 2012: Sukarti Wakiman
- 2012: Suriyadi Halim Omar
- 2012: Thambirajah Muniandy
- 2012: Tunku Annuar
- 2012: Tunku Puteri Intan Safinaz
- 2012: Vadaketh Chacko George
- 2012: Wan Mahmood Pawan Teh
- 2012: Wong Foon Meng
- 2012: Yee Ming Seng
- 2012: Zainal Rampak
- 2012: Zulkifli Zainal Abidin
- 2013: Ab Aziz Kasim
- 2013: Abang Abu Bakar
- 2013: Abd Halim Karim
- 2013: Abdul Aziz Mohd Yassin
- 2013: Abdullah Md Zin
- 2013: Abu Kassim Mohamed
- 2013: Ahmad Maarop
- 2013: Azizan Abdul Razak
- 2013: Azmi Khalid
- 2013: Bustari Yusuf
- 2013: Celestine Ujang Jilan
- 2013: Alex Chen Kooi Chiew
- 2013: Chen Kok Loi
- 2013: Cheng Joo Teik
- 2013: Hii Chii Kok
- 2013: Ketheeswaran Kanagaratnam
- 2013: Koh Kin Lip
- 2013: Lee Fook Long
- 2013: Lim Sing
- 2013: Low Hock Peng
- 2013: Mohamad Zabidi Zainal
- 2013: Mohd Bakke Salleh
- 2013: Mohd Irwan Siregar Abdullah
- 2013: Mohd Khamil Jamil
- 2013: Mohd Radzi Sheikh Ahmad
- 2013: Mohd Ramly Abu Bakar
- 2013: Muhammad Shafee Abdullah
- 2013: Nadraja Ratnam
- 2013: Nathan Elumalay
- 2013: Nik Hussain Abdul Rahman
- 2013: Ong Gim Huat
- 2013: Othman Abd. Razak
- 2013: Peter Chin Fah Kui
- 2013: Rais Yatim
- 2013: Ramasamy Muthusamy
- 2013: Sabri Ahmad
- 2013: Safri Awang Zaidell
- 2013: Sahol Hamid Abu Bakar
- 2013: Shahril Shamsuddin
- 2013: Shukry Mohd Salleh
- 2013: Suleiman Mahmud
- 2013: Syed Abdul Jabbar Syed Hassan
- 2013: Tan Kean Soon
- 2013: Tan Kim Hor
- 2013: Tunku Abdul Hamid Thani
- 2013: Visuvanathan Sinnadurai
- 2013: Michelle Yeoh Choo Kheng
- 2013: Yit Ming Yik
- 2013: Zakaria Abdul Hamid
- 2013: Zamzamzairani Mohd Isa
- 2013: Zulhasnan Rafique
- 2014: Abdul Ghani Othman
- 2014: Abd Karim Shaikh Munisar
- 2014: Abdahir Abdul Majid
- 2014: Abdul Kudus Alias
- 2014: Abdul Rahim Abdul Rahman
- 2014: Abdullah Ahmad
- 2014: Ahmad Zaidee Laidin
- 2014: Chang Ko Youn
- 2014: Chor Chee Heung
- 2014: Chua Soi Lek
- 2014: Esa Mohamed
- 2014: Gan Thian Leong
- 2014: Guok Nguong Peng
- 2014: Hasan Lah
- 2014: Henry Chin Poy Wu
- 2014: Idrus Harun
- 2014: Ismee Ismail
- 2014: Jalaludin Bahaudin
- 2014: Jamaluddin Jarjis
- 2014: Johan Jaaffar
- 2014: Kong Cho Ha
- 2014: Desmond Lim Siew Choon
- 2014: M. Kayveas
- 2014: Madinah Mohamad
- 2014: Mohamad Aziz
- 2014: Mohamad Salim Fateh Din
- 2014: Mohamed Al-Amin Abdul Majid
- 2014: Mohamed Apandi Ali
- 2014: Mohd Ali Rustam
- 2014: Mohd Bakri Mohd Zinin
- 2014: Mohd Effendi Norwawi
- 2014: Mohd Nadzmi Mohd Salleh
- 2014: Mohd Yussof Abdul Latiff
- 2014: Mohd Shukri Ab Yajid
- 2014: Mokhzani Mahathir
- 2014: Ng Chen Oon
- 2014: Ng Yen Yen
- 2014: Ngau Boon Keat
- 2014: Ong Tee Keat
- 2014: Ooi Han Eng
- 2014: Pang Tee Chew
- 2014: Raja Aman Raja Ahmad
- 2014: Raja Mohamed Affandi
- 2014: Jefrin Majanun Jasni
- 2014: Razman Md Hashim
- 2014: Shafie Salleh
- 2014: Syed Muhammad Shahabuddin
- 2014: Jeffrey Tan Kok Wha
- 2014: Teo Chiang Hong
- 2014: Teo Chiang Kok
- 2014: Wilson Baya Dandot
- 2014: Zakri Abdul Hamid
- 2014: Zaleha Zahari
- 2015: Abd Wahab Maskan
- 2015: Abu Samah Nordin
- 2015: Ahmad Phesal Talib
- 2015: Alies Anor Abdul
- 2015: Balakrishnan V. Sinnayah
- 2015: Chu Sui Kiong
- 2015: Farida Mohd Ali
- 2015: Haili Dolhan
- 2015: J. J. Raj Jr.
- 2015: Kong Hon Kong
- 2015: Kuan Peng Ching
- 2015: Lai Teck Peng
- 2015: Lim Hock San
- 2015: Lim Huah Leong
- 2015: Mah King Thian
- 2015: Mohamed Haniffa Abdullah
- 2015: Ng Boon Thong
- 2015: Oh Siew Nam
- 2015: Ong Hong Peng
- 2015: Rebecca Fatima Sta Maria
- 2015: Roslan Saad
- 2015: Siti Sa'diah Sheikh Bakir
- 2015: Sufri Mohd Zin
- 2015: Surin Pitsuwan
- 2015: Tengku Abdullah Sultan Abu Bakar
- 2015: Teo Chiang Liang
- 2015: Zainal Dahalan
- 2015: Zainun Ali
- 2016: Abdul Latiff Abu Bakar
- 2016: Abdul Rahman Sulaiman
- 2016: Abdul Wahid Omar
- 2016: Abdullah Taib
- 2016: Abu Seman Yusop
- 2016: Ahmad Kamarulzaman Ahmad Badaruddin
- 2016: Arpah Abdul Razak
- 2016: Azahar Mohamed
- 2016: Azizah Abdul Ghani
- 2016: Azmil Khalili Khalid
- 2016: Denis Chandratheepam Latimer
- 2016: Empiang Antak
- 2016: Ibrahim Saad
- 2016: Jamaludin Ibrahim
- 2016: Joseph Lo Tain Foh
- 2016: Khair Mohamad Yusof
- 2016: Khoo Chai Kaa
- 2016: Khor Eng Chuen
- 2016: Lau Ngan Siew
- 2016: Lee Yoon Wah
- 2016: Loo Chong Sing
- 2016: Md Yazid Baba
- 2016: Mohamad Fatmi Che Salleh
- 2016: Mohd Amin Jalaludin
- 2016: Mohd Ismail Che Rus
- 2016: Mohd Khalid Mohd Yunus
- 2016: Muhammad Ikmal Opat Abdullah
- 2016: Nallakaruppan Solaimalai
- 2016: Noh Omar
- 2016: Noor Rashid Ibrahim
- 2016: Noorul Ainur Mohd Nur
- 2016: Norazman Hamidun
- 2016: Noriah Kasnon
- 2016: Norliza Rofli
- 2016: Othman Mahmood
- 2016: Othman Hashim
- 2016: Othman Mustafa
- 2016: Palaniappan Ramanathan Chettiar
- 2016: Puvanendran M. Nannithamby
- 2016: Raja Iskandar Dzulkarnain
- 2016: Ramly Ali
- 2016: Ranjit Singh Ajit Singh
- 2016: Saw Choo Boon
- 2016: Shahrizat Abdul Jalil
- 2016: Sulong Matjeraie
- 2016: Tan Koon Swan
- 2016: Tan Seng Leong
- 2016: Tiong Su Kouk
- 2016: Tunku Soraya
- 2016: Veerasingam Suppiah
- 2016: Wences Angang
- 2016: Wong Mook Leong
- 2016: Zaharah Ibrahim
- 2016: Zainul Azman Zainul Aziz
- 2017: Abang Khalid Abang Marzuki
- 2017: Affendi Buang
- 2017: Ahmad Zaki Ansore Mohd Yusof
- 2017: Aziah Ali
- 2017: Chang Koon Wah
- 2017: Charoen Sirivadhanabhakdi
- 2017: Mohd Hashim Abdullah
- 2017: Dzulkifli Ahmad
- 2017: Goh Tian Chuan
- 2017: Halim Syafie
- 2017: Ismail Yusof
- 2017: Joseph Adaikalam
- 2017: Kamaluddin Abdullah
- 2017: Koh Cheng Keong
- 2017: Koon Poh Keong
- 2017: Kunasingam Sittampalam
- 2017: Lim Keng Cheng
- 2017: Lim Kuang Sia
- 2017: Lim Pau Chang
- 2017: Mat Shah Sapuan
- 2017: Mhd Amin Nordin Abdul Aziz
- 2017: Muhammad Ibrahim
- 2017: Leo Michael Toyad
- 2017: Murugan Doraisamy
- 2017: Musa Aman
- 2017: Noor Azlan Ghazali
- 2017: Ooi Kee Liang
- 2017: Rahamat Bivi Yusoff
- 2017: Rajoo Dasari
- 2017: Vigneswaran Sanasee
- 2017: Selvarajo Sinnaiyah
- 2017: Sharifah Zarah Syed Ahmad
- 2017: Siti Zaharah Sulaiman
- 2017: Suleiman Mohamed
- 2017: Syed Danial Syed Ahmad
- 2017: Tee Cheng York
- 2017: Tengku Mohamad Rizam Tengku Abdul Aziz
- 2017: Tengku Noor Zakiah Tengku Ismail
- 2017: Ter Leong Yap
- 2017: Wan Zaki Wan Muda
- 2017: Wan Zulkiflee
- 2017: Zainal Rahim Seman
- 2017: Zainudin Karjan
- 2017: Zulkiple Kassim
- 2019: Abdul Hamid Bador
- 2019: Ahmad Badri Mohd Zahir
- 2019: Ahmad Hasbullah Mohd Nawawi
- 2019: Alwi Ibrahim
- 2019: Badariah Arshad
- 2019: Balia Yusof Wahi
- 2019: Borhan Dolah
- 2019: Chuah Hean Teik
- 2019: Mahamad Fathil Mahmood
- 2019: Mohamad Ariff Md Yusof
- 2019: Mohd Reza Mohd Sany
- 2019: Soh Thian Lai
- 2019: Tommy Thomas
- 2019: Wong Dak Wah
- 2020: Ackbal Abdul Samad
- 2020: Ahmad Nizam Salleh
- 2020: Chew Chee Kin
- 2020: Doraisingam Rengasamy
- 2020: Gan Yu Chai
- 2020: Mazlan Mansor
- 2020: Mohamad Norza Zakaria
- 2020: Mohd Khairul Adib Abd Rahman
- 2020: Noor Hisham Abdullah
- 2020: Nor Shamsiah Mohd Yunus
- 2020: Rohana Yusoff
- 2020: Syed Zainal Abidin Syed Mohamed Tahir
- 2020: Tan Boon Hock
- 2020: Zamrose Mohd Zain
- 2021: Abang Iskandar Abang Hashim
- 2021: Abdul Hadi Awang
- 2021: Azam Baki
- 2021: Azhar Azizan Harun
- 2021: Ismail Ibrahim
- 2021: Lau Eng Guang
- 2021: Leow Chong Howa
- 2021: Liow Tiong Lai
- 2021: Mazlan Othman
- 2021: Mohamad Asfia Awang Nassar
- 2021: Nazir Razak
- 2021: Mohammed Azlan Hashim
- 2021: Mohd Daud Bakar
- 2021: Mohd Shariff Omar
- 2021: Muhammad Shahrul Ikram Yaakob
- 2021: Shahril Ridza Ridzuan
- 2021: Tan Jyh Yaong
- 2021: Tong Kooi Ong
- 2022: Abdul Farid Alias
- 2022: Abdul Ghani Salleh
- 2022: Adnan Yaakob
- 2022: Azmi Rohani
- 2022: Che Khalib Mohamad Noh
- 2022: Idris Jusoh
- 2022: Lee Yoon Kong
- 2022: Low Kian Chuan
- 2022: Mazlan Lazim
- 2022: Mazlan Yusoff
- 2022: Mohd Annuar Zaini
- 2022: Mohd Asghar Khan Goriman Khan
- 2022: Noormustafa Kamal Yahya
- 2022: Ong Ka Chuan
- 2022: Osu Sukam
- 2022: Razarudin Husain
- 2022: Subramaniam Sathasivam
- 2022: Tajuddin Atan
- 2023: Johari Abdul
- 2023: Abdul Rahman Sebli
- 2023: Nallini Patmanathan
- 2023: Mohd Zawawi Salleh
- 2023: Nik Abdul Aziz Nik Mat
- 2023: Ng Hook
- 2023: Gan Seong Liam
- 2023: Sow Chin Chuan
- 2023: Nik Norzul Thani N.Hassan Thani
- 2023: Ahmad Khan Nawab Khan
- 2023: See Hong Cheen @ See Hong Chen
- 2023: Jaganth Derek Steven Sabapathy
- 2023: Syed Faisal Albar Syed A.R. Albar
- 2023: Wee Hoe Soon @ Gooi Hoe Soon
- 2023: Chee Chan Yau @ Cheah Chan Yau
- 2023: Koh Chui Ming
- 2023: Tengku Muhammad Taufik Tengku Aziz
- 2023: Paul Latimer
- 2023: Yeoh Choon San
- 2023: Kong Hoi Chieng
- 2023: Lau Kuan Kam
- 2023: Abdul Rahman Ayob
- 2023: Mohammad Ab Rahman
- 2023: Wan Junaidi Tuanku Jaafar
- 2023: Anifah Aman
- 2023: Lim Kit Siang
- 2023: Mohamad Zabidin Mohd Diah
- 2024: Ahmad Terrirudin
- 2024: Wan Ahmad Dahlan Abdul Aziz
- 2024: Harmindar Singh Dhaliwal
- 2024: Mohd Nasir Ahmad
- 2024: Abdul Razak Abdul Majid
- 2024: Hamidin Mohd Amin
- 2025: Hasnah Mohammed Hashim
- 2025: Zulhelmy Ithnain
- 2025: Ayob Khan Mydin Pitchay
- 2026: Johan Mahmood Merican
- 2026: Amran Mohamed Zin
- 2026: Azhan Md Othman
- 2026: Muhamad Norazlan Aris
- 2026: Avinderjit Singh Harjit Singh

== Honorary Recipients ==
=== Honorary Grand Commanders (S.S.M. (K)) ===
The honorary grand commander also receives the title Tun and his wife Toh Puan.

- 1966: Lee Tong Won
- 1967: Dawee Chullasapya
- 1968: Ardeshir Zahedi
- 1969: Habib Bourguiba
- 1969: Willy Brandt
- 1971: Maraden Panggabean
- 1972: Hamengkubuwono IX
- 1972: Martin Charteris
- 1972: Prasert Ruchirawongse
- 1973: Bhanubandhu Yugala
- 1973: Chatichai Choonhavan
- 1973: George David Woods
- 1973: Kris Sivara
- 1973: Swaeng Senanarong
- 1979: Serm Na Nakorn
- 1982: Abdullah Abdulaziz Al Saud
- 2003: Antonio Puri Purini
- 2003: Franco Frattini
- 2003: Gaetano Gifuni
- 2009: Sirindhorn

=== Honorary Commanders (P.S.M. (K)) ===
The honorary commander also receives the title Tan Sri and his wife Puan Sri.

- 1967: C.G. Ferguson
- 1967: Kriangsak Chamanan
- 1969: Tan Chin Tuan
- 1970: Donald Bernard Waters Good
- 1970: Tan Hian Tsin
- 1971: Chamras Mandukananda
- 1971: Nai Swate Komalabhhuti
- 1971: Pote Bekanan
- 1971: Sudomo
- 1971: Saiyud Kerdphol
- 1971: Sumitro
- 1971: Suwoto Sukendar
- 1972: Kemal Idris
- 1972: A.J. Wood
- 1972: Geoffrey Hardy-Roberts
- 1972: Lek Naeomali
- 1972: Sutopo Juwono
- 1972: Thongkampleo Thongyai
- 1972: Umar Wirahadikusumah
- 1973: Frank Wen King Tsao
- 1973: L.C. Bateman
- 1973: Mohamad Hasan
- 1976: Makmun Murod
- 1976: Widodo Budidarmo
- 1977: Faiz Mohamed Alofy
- 1979: Ashadi Tjahjadi
- 1979: Panieng Kantarat
- 1979: Tan Teck Khim
- 1979: Waloejo Soegito
- 1979: R. Widodo
- 1981: Samut Sahanavin
- 1982: Anthony Synnot
- 1982: Dakleow Susilvorn
- 1982: Hussein bin Al-Jazairi
- 1982: Prayudh Charumani
- 1982: Abdul Mohsen bin Jalawi
- 1982: Saud bin Abdul Muhsin Al Saud
- 1982: Shigeo Nagano
- 1982: Somboon Chuapaibul
- 1983: Abdul Rahman Ramli
- 1984: Nissai Vejjajiva
- 1986: Klaus Blech
- 1986: Muhammad M. Abdul Rauf
- 1987: Himawan Sutanto
- 1987: Narong Mohanond
- 1987: Noboru Gatoh
- 1987: Sunthorn Kongsompong
- 1988: Chawan Chawanid
- 1988: Kampo Harada
- 1988: Maurice Baker
- 1988: Mochammad Sanoesi
- 1988: Piya Chakkaphak
- 1988: Pao Sarasin
- 1989: Goh Yong Hong
- 1989: Pengiran Omar Pengiran Apong
- 1989: Mohamad Daud
- 1989: Winston Choo Wee Leong
- 1990: Hans Joachim Richtler
- 1991: Shōichi Fujimori
- 1991: Fukuda Hiroshi
- 1991: Toyoo Tate
- 1993: Abdul Rahman Besar
- 1993: Chawalit Yodmani
- 1993: Kraisook Sinsook
- 1993: Masaharu Matsushita
- 1993: Sawat Amornvivat
- 1993: Shosuke Idemitsu
- 1994: Feisal Tanjung
- 1994: Tee Tua Ba
- 1994: Voravat Aphichari
- 1995: K. Suzuki
- 1995: Pratin Santiprabhob
- 1995: Renato S de Villa
- 1995: Sulaiman Damit
- 1996: B. Bek Nielsen
- 1996: Roger A. Bertelson
- 1997: Edi Sudradjat
- 1997: Mohammed Hassan Abdul Wali
- 1997: Walanachi Wootisin
- 1998: Harmoko
- 1998: Katsanouke Maeda
- 1998: Isa Ibrahim
- 1999: Ernest Zulliger
- 1999: Mahmoud Muhammad Safar
- 1999: Mongkon Ampornpisit
- 2000: Lin Cheng Yuan
- 2002: Just Faaland
- 2003: Da'i Bachtiar
- 2003: Giuseppe Balboni Acqua
- 2003: Giuseppe Baldocci
- 2004: Ahmed El-Farra
- 2004: Iyad bin Amin Madani
- 2004: Hamed M.A. Yahya
- 2004: Marek Paszucha
- 2004: Masajuro Shiokawa
- 2005: David Chiu Tat-cheong
- 2005: Khoo Boon Hui
- 2005: Carl Philip
- 2005: Madeline
- 2006: Chang Yung-fa
- 2006: Fumihiko Konishi
- 2007: Rainer Althoff
- 2009: Albert Cheng Yong Kim
- 2009: Ekmeleddin İhsanoğlu
- 2009: Peter Sondakh
- 2009: Zainuddin Jalani
- 2010: Bambang Hendarso Danuri
- 2011: Wichean Potephosree
- 2011: Zuhair Abdul Hamid Mokhtar Sadayo
- 2012: Peter Ong Boon Kwee
- 2012: Surin Upatkoon
- 2014: Adul Saengsingkaew
- 2015: Lim Jock Seng
- 2015: Moeldoko
- 2015: Surin Pitsuwan
- 2016: Abdulrahman bin Saleh Al-Bunyan
- 2017: Charoen Sirivadhanabhakdi
- 2017: Chuang Chou Wen
- 2017: Gerry Tung Ching Sai
- 2017: Steve Miligan
- 2017: Yuhao Aixinjueluo
- 2019: Ali Mehsin Fetais
- 2019: Adul Sangsingkeo
- 2020: Badrodin Haiti
- 2020: Budi Gunawan
