= Yaacob Abdul Latiff =

Malaysian politician

Yang Berbahagia Tan Sri Dato' Seri Yaacob Abdul Latiff PSM SPMS JMN

2nd Mayor of Kuala Lumpur
- In office 16 May 1972 – 31 October 1980
- Preceded by: Lokman Yusof
- Succeeded by: Elyas Omar

Personal details
- Born: 1 February 1918 Klang, Selangor, Federated Malay States, British Malaya (now Malaysia)
- Died: 9 September 1985 (aged 67) Kuala Lumpur, Malaysia
- Resting place: Jalan Ampang Muslim Cemetery, Kuala Lumpur

Yaacob bin Abdul Latiff (1 February 1918 – 9 September 1985) was the second Mayor of Kuala Lumpur, Malaysia since it was officially conferred the status of the city on 16 May 1972. He served for a period of 8 years. On 1 November 1980, he was succeeded by Elyas Omar.

Tan Sri Yaacob Latiff attended Victoria Institution for his secondary school education.

His son, Ibrahim Yaacob was Parti Keadilan Rakyat (PKR) candidate for Setiawangsa's parliamentary constituency during the 2008 General Election in Kuala Lumpur Federal Territory. He lost to Barisan Nasional (BN) candidate, Zulhasnan Rafique in the election.

== Honours ==
=== Honours of Malaysia ===
- Malaya
  - Companion of the Order of the Defender of the Realm (JMN) (1958)
- Malaysia
  - Commander of the Order of Loyalty to the Crown of Malaysia (PSM) – Tan Sri (1966)
- Selangor
  - Knight Grand Commander of the Order of the Crown of Selangor (SPMS) – Dato' Seri (1975)

=== Places named in honour of him ===
- SMK Yaacob Latiff, Taman Maluri, Kuala Lumpur
- Jalan Yaacob Latiff, (formerly Jalan Tenteram), Bandar Tun Razak, Kuala Lumpur
- SK Yaacob Latif 1, Taman Maluri, Kuala Lumpur

Preceded by Lokman Yusof	Mayor of Kuala Lumpur; 1972 – 1980	Succeeded by Elyas Omar
