= Datok Lokman National Secondary School =

National school in Kuala Lumpur, Malaysia

- Sekolah Menengah Kebangsaan Datok Lokman

Location
- Kuala Lumpur, Federal Territory; Malaysia; 3.1394°N 101.7285°E

Information
- Type: Public secondary school
- Motto: Ilmu asas kemajuan (Knowledge is the basis of progress)
- Established: 1962
- Headmaster: Suhaimi Bin Mustapa
- Form: Form 1 - Form 5
- Affiliations: Malaysia Ministry Of Education

Datok Lokman National Secondary School (Malay: Sekolah Menengah Kebangsaan Datok Lokman) is a national secondary school in Kuala Lumpur, Malaysia. The school is located at Jalan Kampung Pandan, which is near Aminuddin Baki National Secondary School. The school was named after the first Lord Mayor (Datuk Bandar) of Kuala Lumpur, Tan Sri Dato' Lokman Yusof.
