= Mhd Amin Nordin Abdul Aziz =

Malaysian civil servant

Yang Berbahagia Tan Sri Datuk Seri Mhd Amin Nordin Abdul Aziz PSM PJN SMW PMW

11th Mayor of Kuala Lumpur
- In office 18 July 2015 – 30 September 2018
- Preceded by: Ahmad Phesal Talib
- Succeeded by: Nor Hisham Ahmad Dahlan

Personal details
- Born: 1 August 1955 (age 71) Negeri Sembilan, Federation of Malaya (now Malaysia)
- Spouse: Puan Sri Rohmah Latif
- Education: University of Malaya; University of Birmingham

Mhd Amin Nordin bin Abdul Aziz (born 1 August 1955) is a Malaysian civil servant who served as mayor of Kuala Lumpur from 2015 to 2018.

== Career ==
Nordin was the Director-General of Kuala Lumpur City Hall before his appointment to the mayoral office (prior to that, he was also already a senior experienced civil servant in different government departments and ministries). He was appointed Mayor of Kuala Lumpur by Tengku Adnan Tengku Mansor, then-Minister of Federal Territories to succeed Ahmad Phesal Talib, who decided to take mandatory retirement upon reaching 60 years of age and not having a desire to renew his contract.

== Honours ==
=== Honours of Malaysia ===
- Malaysia
  - Commander of the Order of Loyalty to the Crown of Malaysia (PSM) – Tan Sri (2017)
  - Commander of the Order of Meritorious Service (PJN) – Datuk (2015)
- Federal Territory (Malaysia)
  - Grand Commander of the Order of the Territorial Crown (SMW) – Datuk Seri (2016)
  - Commander of the Order of the Territorial Crown (PMW) – Datuk (2008)
