= Lokman Yusof =

First mayor of Kuala Lumpur

Yang Berbahagia Tan Sri Dato' Lokman Yusof PSM DPMS JMN PPT PJK PPM
- لقمان يوسف

1st Mayor of Kuala Lumpur
- In office 1 February 1972 – 13 May 1972
- Preceded by: position established
- Succeeded by: Yaacob Abdul Latiff

Personal details
- Born: 11 September 1910 Linggi, Negeri Sembilan, Federated Malay States, British Malaya (now Malaysia)
- Died: 15 May 1972 (aged 61) Seremban, Negeri Sembilan, Malaysia
- Education: Raffles College

Lokman bin Yusof (11 September 1910 – 13 May 1972) was the first Mayor of Kuala Lumpur, Malaysia since it was officially conferred the status of a city on 1 February 1972. He formerly served as the Federal Capital Commissioner prior to his mayorship. Lokman died on 15 May 1972 and was succeeded by Yaacob Abdul Latiff.

== Honours ==
=== Honours of Malaysia ===
- Malaysia
  - Commander of the Order of Loyalty to the Crown of Malaysia (PSM) – Tan Sri (1971)
  - Companion of the Order of the Defender of the Realm (JMN) (1965)
  - Recipient of the Malaysia Commemorative Medal (Silver) (PPM) (1965)
- Negeri Sembilan
  - Distinguished Conduct Medal (PPT) (1969)
- Selangor
  - Knight Commander of the Order of the Crown of Selangor (DPMS) – Dato' (1964)
  - Recipient of the Meritorious Service Medal (PJK) (1962)

== Places named in honour of him ==
- SMK Datok Lokman, Jalan Kampung Pandan, Kuala Lumpur

Preceded by None	Mayor of Kuala Lumpur; 1972	Succeeded by Yaacob Latiff
