= Elyas Omar =

Malaysian politician (1936–2018)

Yang Berbahagia Tan Sri Datuk Seri Utama Elyas Omar PSM SUMW SMW SIMP DSSA DMPN JSM KMN

3rd Mayor of Kuala Lumpur
- In office 1 November 1980 – 17 September 1992
- Preceded by: Yaacob Abdul Latiff
- Succeeded by: Mazlan Ahmad

Personal details
- Born: Elyas bin Omar; 16 November 1936 Penang, Straits Settlements (now Malaysia)
- Died: 15 May 2018 (aged 81) National Heart Institute, Kuala Lumpur, Malaysia
- Resting place: Jalan Ampang Muslim Cemetery, Kuala Lumpur
- Spouse(s): Fawziah Abdul Hamid (div. 2000); Dayang Normala Binti Awang Tambi
- Children: 8
- Education: University of Malaya

Elyas bin Omar (16 November 1936 – 15 May 2018) was the third Mayor of Kuala Lumpur, as well as the longest serving Mayor in the History of Kuala Lumpur. He served for a period of 12 years. Elyas was the president of the Badminton Association of Malaysia (BAM) and during his tenure, Malaysia won the Thomas Cup in 1992. In football, Elyas was president of Kuala Lumpur FA when it won the Malaysia Cup three times in a row from 1987 to 1989. On 17 November 1992, he was succeeded by Mazlan Ahmad as Mayor of Kuala Lumpur.

== Personal life ==
He married Fawziah Abdul Hamid, with whom he has three children, and Dayang Normala Haji Awang Tambi, with whom he has five children. In 2000, he divorced Fawziah Abdul Hamid.

== The Main Initiator of the Idea to Build Putrajaya ==
Elyas omar is the main initiator of the idea to build Putrajaya. Where during the reign of YABhg Tun Dr Mahathir Mohamad, Elyas Omar sparked the idea for the construction of a government administrative centre where all the buildings are occupied by government offices.

Where initially YABhg Tun Dr Mahathir Mohamad planned to build a government administration center in Janda Baik, Pahang. Following the soil ecology report for the land related to Unsuitable.

Therefore, YABhg Tun Dr Mahathir Mohamad we selected a venue between Kuala Lumpur and the KL International Airport (KLIA), for the construction of the following government administration center.

== Honours ==
=== Honours of Malaysia ===
- Malaysia
  - Commander of the Order of Loyalty to the Crown of Malaysia (PSM) – Tan Sri (1990)
  - Companion of the Order of Loyalty to the Crown of Malaysia (JSM) (1976)
  - Officer of the Order of the Defender of the Realm (KMN) (1969).
- Federal Territory (Malaysia)
  - Grand Knight of the Order of the Territorial Crown (SUMW) – Datuk Seri Utama (2016)
  - Grand Commander of the Order of the Territorial Crown (SMW) – Datuk Seri (2008)
- Pahang
  - Grand Knight of the Order of the Crown of Pahang (SIMP) – Dato' Indera (1988).
- Penang
  - Companion of the Order of the Defender of State (DMPN) – Dato' (1985).
- Selangor
  - Knight Companion of the Order of Sultan Salahuddin Abdul Aziz Shah (DSSA) – Dato' (1989).

== Places named in honour of him ==
- Auditorium Elyas Omar.

| Preceded by Yaacob Latiff | Mayor of Kuala Lumpur; 1980 – 1992 | Succeeded by Mazlan Ahmad |
