= Kamaruzzaman Shariff =

Malaysian politician

Yang Berbahagia Tan Sri Dato' Indera Kamaruzzaman Shariff PSM SIMP JMN

5th Mayor of Kuala Lumpur
- In office 14 December 1995 – 12 December 2001
- Preceded by: Mazlan Ahmad
- Succeeded by: Mohmad Shaid Mohd Taufek

Personal details
- Born: 18 May 1941 (age 84); Besut, Terengganu, Japanese occupation of Malaya

Kamaruzzaman bin Shariff (born 18 May 1941) was the 5th Mayor of Kuala Lumpur.

== Honours ==
- Malaysia
  - Commander of the Order of Loyalty to the Crown of Malaysia (PSM) – Tan Sri (1995)
  - Companion of the Order of the Defender of the Realm (JMN) (1993)
- Pahang
  - Grand Knight of the Order of the Crown of Pahang (SIMP) – formerly Dato', now Dato' Indera (1998)
