= Ahmad Fuad Ismail =

Malaysian politician

Yang Berbahagia Tan Sri Datuk Seri Ahmad Fuad Ismail PSM SMW DSIS DSPN DSDK AMN

9th Mayor of Kuala Lumpur
- In office 14 December 2007 – 12 July 2013
- Preceded by: Ab Hakim Borhan
- Succeeded by: Ahmad Phesal Talib

Personal details
- Born: 16 July 1953 (age 73) Kedah, Federation of Malaya (now Malaysia)
- Education: University of Malaya

Tan Sri Datuk Seri Ahmad Fuad bin Ismail (born 16 July 1953) was the 9th mayor of Kuala Lumpur from 2007 to 2013. He was in office from 14 December 2007 to 12 July 2013.

== Honour ==
=== Honour of Malaysia ===
- Malaysia
  - Commander of the Order of Loyalty to the Crown of Malaysia (PSM) – Tan Sri (2010)
  - Member of the Order of the Defender of the Realm (AMN) (1990)
- Federal Territory (Malaysia)
  - Grand Commander of the Order of the Territorial Crown (SMW) – Datuk Seri (2010)
- Kedah
  - Knight Companion of the Order of Loyalty to the Royal House of Kedah (DSDK) – Dato' (2008)
- Penang
  - Officer of the Order of the Defender of State (DSPN) – Dato' (2005)
- Selangor
  - Knight Companion of the Order of Sultan Sharafuddin Idris Shah (DSIS) – Dato' (2002)
