= Mohmad Shaid Mohd Taufek =

Malaysian public servant

Yang Berbahagia Datuk Mohmad Shaid Mohd Taufek PJN

6th Mayor of Kuala Lumpur
- In office 14 December 2001 – 12 December 2003
- Preceded by: Kamaruzzaman Shariff
- Succeeded by: Ruslin Hasan

Personal details
- Born: 16 July 1947 (age 77); Port Dickson, Negeri Sembilan, Malayan Union

Datuk Mohmad Shaid bin Mohd Taufek (born 16 July 1947) is a Malaysian public servant who served as the 6th Mayor of Kuala Lumpur.

== Honours ==
- Malaysia
  - Commander of the Order of Meritorious Service (PJN) – Datuk (2001)
