= Ruslin Hasan =

Malaysian politician (born 1950)

Yang Berbahagia Datuk Seri Haji Ruslin Hasan PJN SMW DMSM DSNS KMN AMN

7th Mayor of Kuala Lumpur
- In office 14 December 2003 – 12 December 2005
- Preceded by: Mohmad Shaid Mohd Taufek
- Succeeded by: Ab Hakim Borhan

Personal details
- Born: 10 July 1949 (age 76) Paya Rumput, Masjid Tanah, Malacca, Federation of Malaya

Datuk Seri Ruslin bin Hasan (born 10 July 1949) is a Malaysian politician who was the 7th Mayor of Kuala Lumpur.

== Honours ==
- Malaysia :
  - Commander of the Order of Meritorious Service (PJN) – Datuk (2006)
  - Officer of the Order of the Defender of the Realm (KMN) (1996)
  - Member of the Order of the Defender of the Realm (AMN) (1984)
- Federal Territory (Malaysia)
  - Grand Commander of the Order of the Territorial Crown (SMW) – Datuk Seri (2013)
- Malacca :
  - Companion Class I of the Exalted Order of Malacca (DMSM) – Datuk (2001)
- Negeri Sembilan :
  - Knight Companion of the Order of Loyalty to Negeri Sembilan (DSNS) – Dato' (2005)
