= Mazlan Ahmad =

Malaysian politician (1941–2018)

Yang Berbahagia Tan Sri Datuk Mazlan Ahmad PSM PJN DPMP DSPJ JMN

4th Mayor of Kuala Lumpur
- In office 17 November 1992 – 12 December 1995
- Preceded by: Elyas Omar
- Succeeded by: Kamaruzzaman Shariff

Personal details
- Born: 1941; Perlis, Japanese-occupied Malaya (now Malaysia)
- Died: 1 April 2018 (aged 76–77); Kuala Lumpur, Malaysia
- Resting place: Bukit Kiara Muslim Cemetery, Kuala Lumpur

Tan Sri Datuk Mazlan bin Ahmad (1941 – 1 April 2018) was a Malaysian politician who served as the 4th Mayor of Kuala Lumpur from 1992 to 1995.

== Death ==
Mazlan died at Hospital Universiti Kebangsaan Malaysia on 1 April 2018 and was buried at Bukit Kiara Muslim Cemetery in Kuala Lumpur.

== Honours ==
=== Honours of Malaysia ===
- Malaysia :
  - Commander of the Order of Loyalty to the Crown of Malaysia (PSM) – Tan Sri (1997)
  - Commander of the Order of Meritorious Service (PJN) – Datuk (1995)
  - Companion of the Order of the Defender of the Realm (JMN) (1990)
- Perlis :
  - Knight Commander of the Order of the Crown of Perlis (DPMP) – Dato' (1995)
  - Knight Companion of the Order of the Gallant Prince Syed Putra Jamalullail (DSPJ) – Dato' (1997)
