= Ahmad Phesal Talib =

Malaysian civil servant

Yang Berbahagia Tan Sri Datuk Seri Ahmad Phesal Talib PSM PJN SMW DSPN AMN
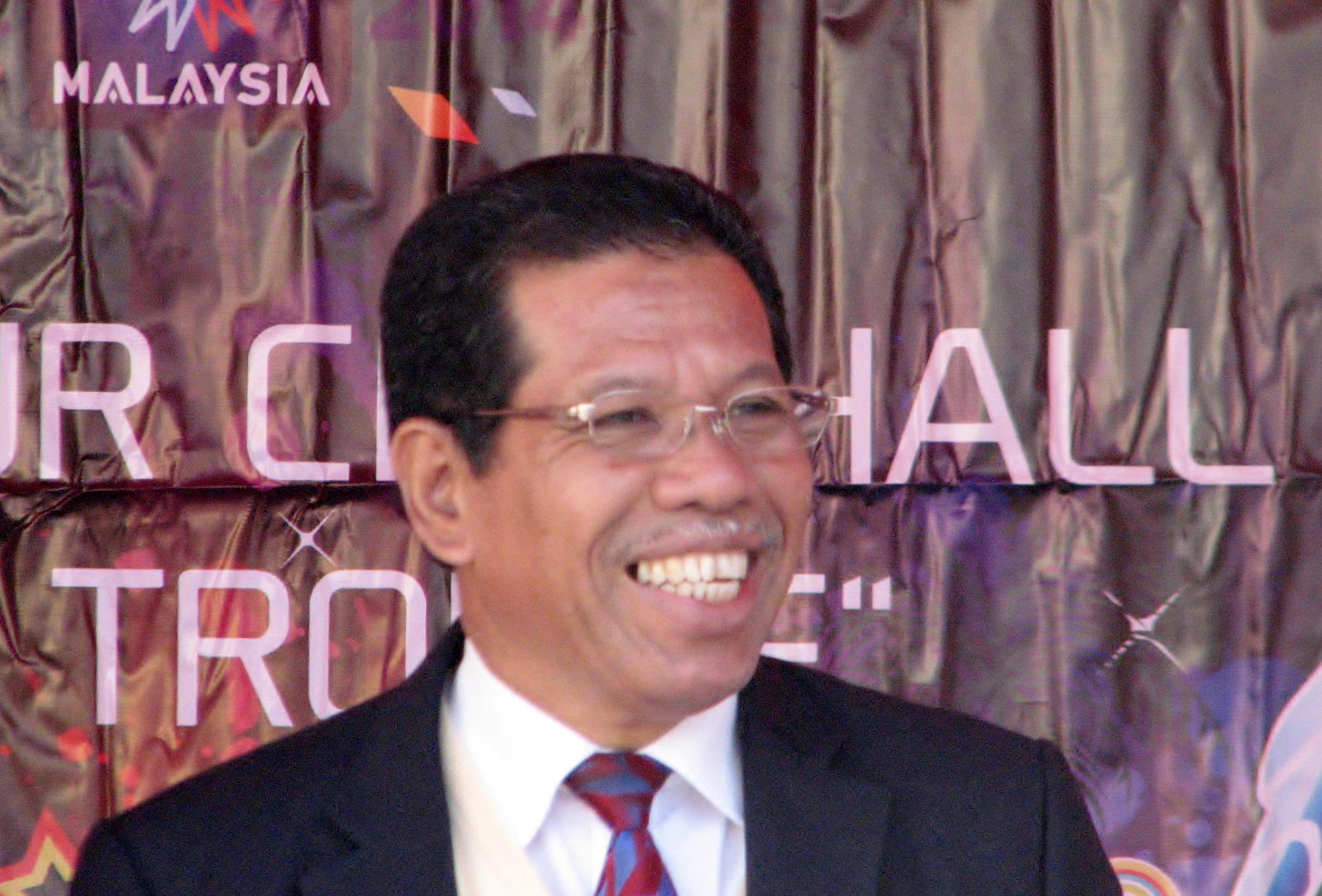

10th Mayor of Kuala Lumpur
- In office 18 July 2012 – 17 July 2015
- Preceded by: Ahmad Fuad Ismail
- Succeeded by: Mhd Amin Nordin Abdul Aziz

Personal details
- Born: 1954 (age 70–71)

Ahmad Phesal bin Talib (born 1955) was a Malaysian public servant who served as 10th Mayor of Kuala Lumpur.

== Honours ==
- Malaysia :
  - Commander of the Order of Loyalty to the Crown of Malaysia (PSM) – Tan Sri (2015)
  - Commander of the Order of Meritorious Service (PJN) – Datuk (2012)
  - Member of the Order of the Defender of the Realm (AMN) (1998)
- Federal Territory (Malaysia) :
  - Grand Commander of the Order of the Territorial Crown (SMW) – Datuk Seri (2013)
- Penang :
  - Officer of the Order of the Defender of State (DSPN) – Dato' (2003)
