= List of University of Malaya people =

The following is a list of notable alumni and faculty of University of Malaya.

== Notable alumni ==
=== Royalty ===
- Raja Jaafar ibni Almarhum Raja Muda Musa – Crown Prince of Perak
- Raja Nor Mahani binti Almarhum Raja Shahar Shah – Crown Princess of Perak

=== Government and politics ===
==== Heads of state or government ====
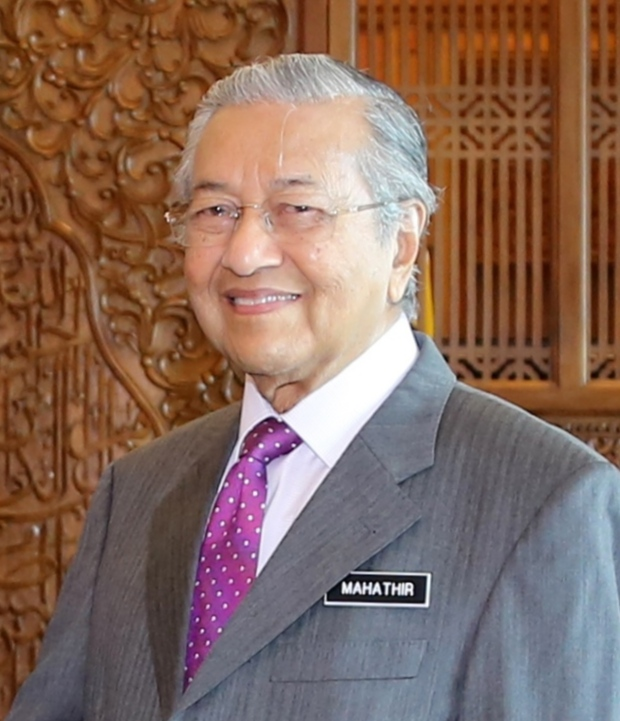
Mahathir Mohamad, 4th and 7th Prime Minister of Malaysia

- Mahathir Mohamad – 4th and 7th Prime Minister of Malaysia
- Abdullah Ahmad Badawi – 5th Prime Minister of Malaysia
- Muhyiddin Yassin – 8th Prime Minister of Malaysia
- Ismail Sabri Yaakob – 9th Prime Minister of Malaysia
- Anwar Ibrahim – 10th Prime Minister of Malaysia
- Benjamin Sheares – 2nd President of Singapore
- S. R. Nathan – 6th President of Singapore

==== Deputy prime ministers, senior ministers and leaders of the opposition ====
- Musa Hitam – 5th Deputy Prime Minister of Malaysia
- Ahmad Zahid Hamidi – 11th and 14th Deputy Prime Minister of Malaysia, 14th Leader of the Opposition
- Fadillah Yusof – 14th Deputy Prime Minister of Malaysia
- Tan Chee Khoon – 2nd Leader of the Opposition
- Jahara Hamid - Leader of the Opposition of Penang

==== Governors, chief ministers, and mayors ====
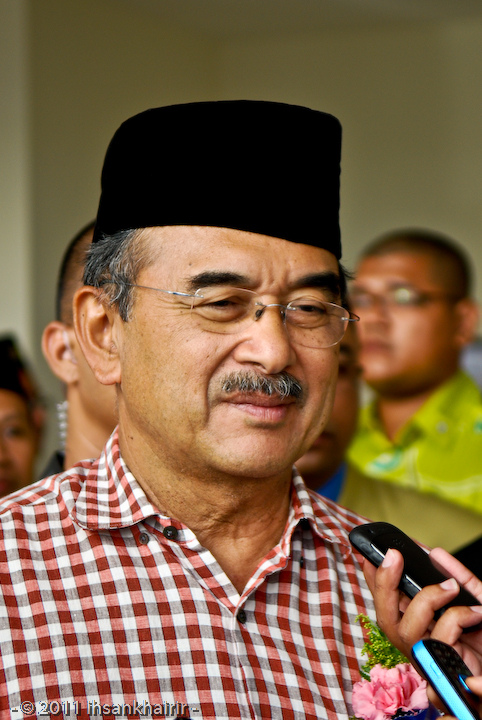
Mohd Ali Rustam, Chief Minister of Malacca

- Awang Hassan – 5th Yang di-Pertua Negeri of Penang
- Hamdan Sheikh Tahir – 6th Yang di-Pertua Negeri of Penang
- Abdul Rahman Abbas – 7th Yang di-Pertua Negeri of Penang
- Ahmad Fuzi Abdul Razak – 8th Yang di-Pertua Negeri of Penang
- Mohd Khalil Yaakob – 6th Yang di-Pertua Negeri of Malacca, 12th Menteri Besar of Pahang
- Mohd Ali Rustam – 7th Yang di-Pertua Negeri of Malacca, 9th Chief Minister of Malacca
- Adnan Yaakob – 13th Menteri Besar of Pahang
- Muhammad Muhammad Taib – 11th Menteri Besar of Selangor
- Khir Toyo – 13th Menteri Besar of Selangor
- Abdul Khalid Ibrahim – 14th Menteri Besar of Selangor
- Mohd Isa Abdul Samad – 11th Menteri Besar of Negeri Sembilan
- Mohamad Hasan – 12th Menteri Besar of Negeri Sembilan
- Ismail Lasim - 14th Menteri Besar of Negeri Sembilan
- Abdul Ajib Ahmad – 12th Menteri Besar of Johor
- Mohamed Khaled Nordin – 15th Menteri Besar of Johor
- Shahidan Kassim – 7th Menteri Besar of Perlis
- Abdul Rahim Thamby Chik – 6th Chief Minister of Malacca
- Douglas Uggah Embas – Deputy Premier of Sarawak
- Ramasamy Palanisamy – Deputy Chief Minister of Penang II
- Elyas Omar – 3rd Mayor of Kuala Lumpur
- Ahmad Fuad Ismail – 9th Mayor of Kuala Lumpur
- Mhd Amin Nordin Abdul Aziz – 11th Mayor of Kuala Lumpur
- Abu Sujak Mahmud – 1st Mayor of Shah Alam

==== Federal ministers ====
- Daim Zainuddin – 5th and 9th Minister of Finance
- Rafidah Aziz – 1st Minister of International Trade and Industry
- Lim Swee Aun – 4th Minister of Commerce and Industry
- Saifuddin Abdullah – 13th and 15th Minister of Foreign Affairs
- Chua Soi Lek – 17th Minister of Health
- Adham Baba – 21st Minister of Health
- Ahmad Shabery Cheek – 15th Minister of Information
- Maszlee Malik – 22nd Minister of Education
- Shafie Salleh – 1st Minister of Higher Education
- Chan Kong Choy – 10th Minister of Transport
- Liow Tiong Lai – 14th Minister of Transport
- Anthony Loke – 15th and 17th Minister of Transport
- Megat Junid Megat Ayub – 3rd Minister of Domestic Trade and Consumer Affairs
- Shahrir Abdul Samad – 6th Minister of Domestic Trade and Consumer Affairs
- Hasan Malek – 8th Minister of Domestic Trade and Consumer Affairs
- Ong Ka Chuan – 8th Minister of Housing and Local Government
- Nga Kor Ming – 20th Minister of Local Government Development
- V. Sivakumar – 7th Minister of Human Resources
- Steven Sim – 8th Minister of Human Resources
- Shamsul Anuar Nasarah – 1st Minister of Energy and Natural Resources
- Takiyuddin Hassan – 2nd Minister of Energy and Natural Resources
- G. Palanivel – 4th Minister of Natural Resources and Environment
- Teresa Kok – 1st Minister of Primary Industries
- Ewon Ebin – 3rd Minister of Science, Innovation and Technology
- Sabbaruddin Chik – 1st Minister of Tourism, Arts and Culture
- Ng Yen Yen – 4th Minister of Tourism
- Shahrizat Abdul Jalil – 1st and 3rd Minister of Women, Family and Community Development
- Zaleha Ismail – 2nd Minister of National Unity and Community Development
- Azalina Othman Said – Minister in the Prime Minister's Department (Law and Institutional Reform)
- Abdul Latiff Ahmad – Minister in the Prime Minister's Department (Special Functions)
- Mujahid Yusof Rawa – Minister in the Prime Minister's Department (Religious Affairs)
- Jamil Khir Baharom – Minister in the Prime Minister's Department (Islamic Affairs)
- Nor Mohamed Yakcop – Minister in the Prime Minister's Department (Economic Planning)
- Ahmad Husni Hanadzlah – Second Minister of Finance
- Liew Chin Tong – Deputy Minister of International Trade and Industry
- Mah Hang Soon – Deputy Minister of Education
- Lee Boon Chye – Deputy Minister of Health
- Lukanisman Awang Sauni – Deputy Minister of Health
- Hou Kok Chung – Deputy Minister of Higher Education
- Mary Yap – Deputy Minister of Higher Education
- Mustapha Sakmud – Deputy Minister of Higher Education
- Ahmad Masrizal Muhammad – Deputy Minister of Higher Education
- Sivarasa Rasiah – Deputy Minister of Rural Development
- Chan Foong Hin - Deputy Minister of Agriculture and Food Security
- Tajuddin Abdul Rahman – Deputy Minister of Agriculture and Agro-based Industry

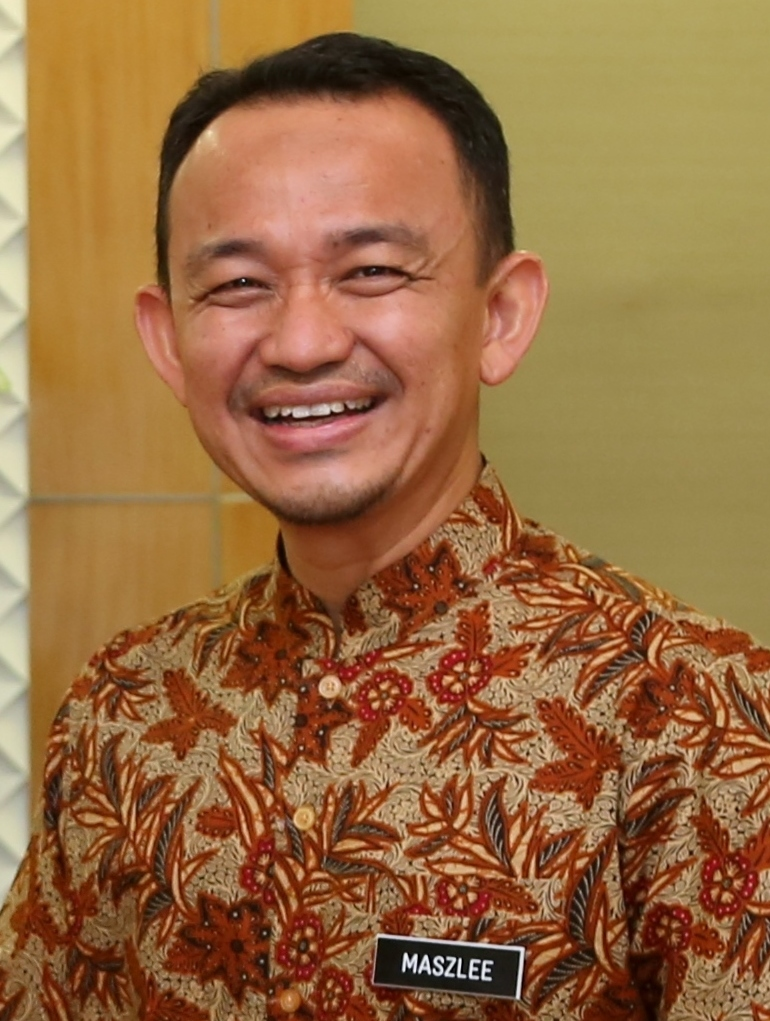
Maszlee Malik, Minister of Education

==== Speakers and deputy speakers ====
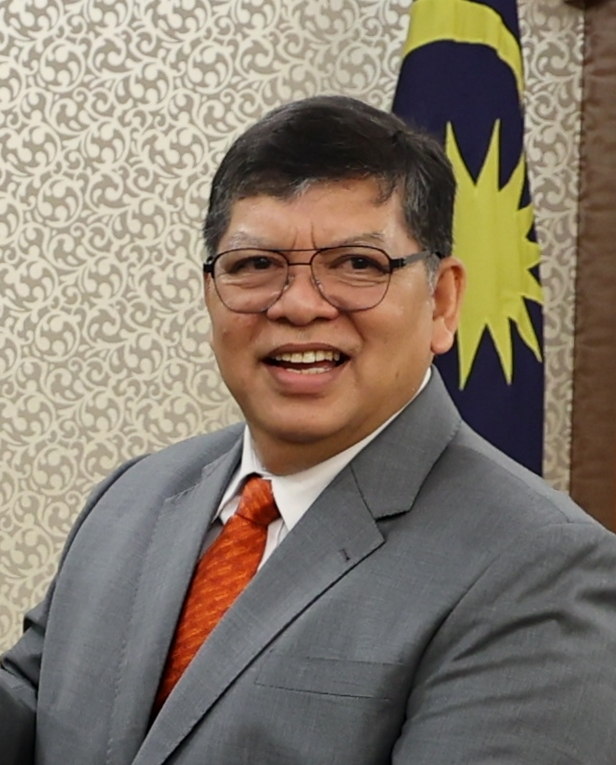
Johari Abdul, Speaker of the Dewan Rakyat

- Azhar Azizan Harun – 10th Speaker of the Dewan Rakyat
- Johari Abdul – 11th Speaker of the Dewan Rakyat
- Vigneswaran Sanasee – 17th President of the Dewan Negara
- Mutang Tagal – 20th President of the Dewan Negara
- Awang Bemee Awang Ali Basah – 21st President of the Dewan Negara
- Lau Weng San – Speaker of the Selangor State Legislative Assembly
- Ngeh Koo Ham – Speaker of the Perak State Legislative Assembly
- Devamany S. Krishnasamy – Speaker of the Perak State Legislative Assembly

==== Elected representatives ====
===== Senators =====
- Awang Sariyan – Senator at the Dewan Negara At-large
- Mohd Hasbie Muda – Senator at the Dewan Negara At-large
- Husam Musa – Senator at the Dewan Negara At-large
- Rita Sarimah Patrick Insol – Senator at the Dewan Negara At-large
- Mohammad Redzuan Othman – Senator at the Dewan Negara for Selangor
- Syed Husin Ali – Senator at the Dewan Negara for Selangor
- Hoh Khai Mun – Senator at the Dewan Negara for Pahang
- Siti Aishah Shaik Ismail – Senator at the Dewan Negara for Penang
- Nuridah Mohd Salleh – Senator at the Dewan Negara for Terengganu

===== Members of Parliament (MP) =====
- Che Alias Hamid – Member of Parliament for Kemaman
- Che Mohamad Zulkifly Jusoh – Member of Parliament for Besut
- Sabri Azit – Member of Parliament for Jerai
- Ahmad Tarmizi Sulaiman – Member of Parliament for Sik
- Hasan Arifin – Member of Parliament for Rompin
- Hasan Bahrom – Member of Parliament for Tampin
- Hassan Abdul Karim – Member of Parliament for Pasir Gudang
- Noor Azmi Ghazali – Member of Parliament for Bagan Serai
- Fasiah Fakeh – Member of Parliament for Sabak Bernam
- Kasthuriraani Patto – Member of Parliament for Batu Kawan
- Tan Kee Kwong – Member of Parliament for Wangsa Maju
- Tan Yee Kew – Member of Parliament for Wangsa Maju
- Cha Kee Chin – Member of Parliament for Rasah
- Wong Hon Wai – Member of Parliament for Bukit Bendera
- Khoo Poay Tiong – Member of Parliament for Kota Melaka
- Chan Foong Hin – Member of Parliament for Kota Kinabalu
- Vivian Wong Shir Yee – Member of Parliament for Sandakan
- James Peter Ongkili – Member of Parliament for Tuaran
- Masir Kujat – Member of Parliament for Sri Aman
- Irmohizam Ibrahim – Member of Parliament for Kuala Selangor
- Ariff Sabri Abdul Aziz – Member of Parliament for Raub
- Chow Yu Hui – Member of Parliament for Raub
- Mohd Misbahul Munir Masduki – Member of Parliament for Parit Buntar
- Syahir Sulaiman – Member of Parliament for Bachok
- Jailani Johari – Member of Parliament for Hulu Terengganu
- Mahadzir Mohd Khir – Member of Parliament for Sungai Petani
- Rahman Ismail – Member of Parliament for Gombak
- Ng Wei Aik – Member of Parliament for Tanjong
- K. S. Nijhar – Member of Parliament for Subang
- Michael Jeyakumar Devaraj – Member of Parliament for Sungai Siput
- Sivarraajh Chandran – Member of Parliament for Cameron Highlands
- K. Pathmanaban – Member of Parliament for Teluk Kemang
- K. Mohd Ariff – Member of the Federal Legislative Council of Malaya

===== Members of the State Legislative Assembly (MLA) =====
- Chew Chong Sin – Member of the Johor State Legislative Assembly for Mengkibol
- Mohd Ramli Md Kari – Member of the Johor State Legislative Assembly for Senggarang
- Md Jais Sarday – Member of the Johor State Legislative Assembly for Mahkota
- Sheikh Umar Bagharib Ali – Member of the Johor State Legislative Assembly for Paloh
- Ahmad Lebai Sudin – Member of the Kedah State Legislative Assembly for Bukit Lada
- Wan Roslan Wan Hamat – Member of the Kelantan State Legislative Assembly for Pengkalan Kubor
- Khaidirah Abu Zahar – Member of the Melaka State Legislative Assembly for Rim
- Abu Ubaidah Redza – Member of the Negeri Sembilan State Legislative Assembly for Ampangan
- Abdul Fattah Abdullah – Member of the Pahang State Legislative Assembly for Padang Tengku
- Mohd Hafez Sabri – Member of the Perak State Legislative Assembly for Manjoi
- Muhd Fadhil Nuruddin – Member of the Perak State Legislative Assembly for Kamunting
- Jason Ng Thien Yeong – Member of the Perak State Legislative Assembly for Astaka
- Wasanthee Sinnasamy – Member of the Perak State Legislative Assembly for Hutan Melintang
- Fahmi Zainol – Member of the Penang State Legislative Assembly for Pantai Jerejak
- Fakhrul Anwar Ismail – Member of the Perlis State Legislative Assembly for Bintong
- Annuar Rapa'ee – Member of the Sarawak State Legislative Assembly for Nangka
- Rosey Yunus – Member of the Sarawak State Legislative Assembly for Bekenu
- Aliakbar Gulasan – Member of the Sabah State Legislative Assembly for Karambunai
- K. Parthiban – Member of the Selangor State Legislative Assembly for Ijok
- M. Manoharan – Member of the Selangor State Legislative Assembly for Kota Alam Shah
- Hasan Mohamed Ali – Member of the Selangor State Legislative Assembly for Gombak Setia
- Jamil Salleh – Member of the Selangor State Legislative Assembly for Dengkil
- Zawawi Mughni – Member of the Selangor State Legislative Assembly for Sungai Kandis
- Sallehen Mukhyi – Member of the Selangor State Legislative Assembly for Sabak
- Daroyah Alwi – Member of the Selangor State Legislative Assembly for Sementa
- Karim Mansor - Member of the Selangor State Legislative Assembly for Tanjong Sepat
- Lee Kee Hiong - Member of the Selangor State Legislative Assembly for Kuala Kubu Baharu
- Hee Loy Sian – Member of the Selangor State Legislative Assembly for Kajang
- Satiful Bahri Mamat – Member of the Terengganu State Legislative Assembly for Paka
- Tengku Hassan Tengku Omar – Member of the Terengganu State Legislative Assembly for Ladang

==== International politicians ====
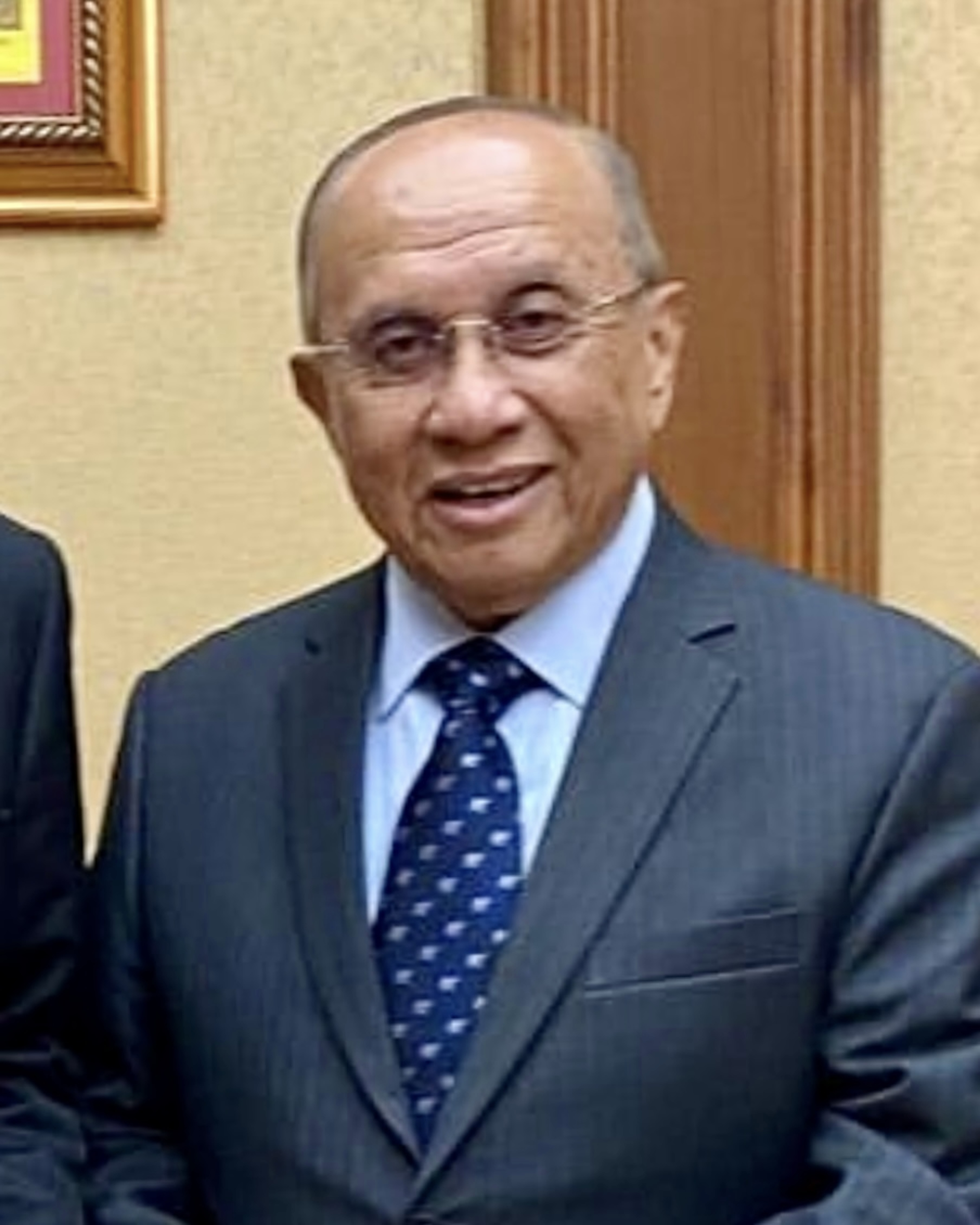
Abdul Rahman Taib, Speaker of the Brunei Legislative Council

- Abdul Rahman Taib – 8th Speaker of the Brunei Legislative Council
- Abu Bakar Apong – 5th Minister of Home Affairs of Brunei
- Ahmad Jumat – 4th Minister of Culture, Youth and Sports of Brunei
- Juri Ardiantoro – Deputy Minister of the State Secretariat, Indonesia
- Effendy Choirie – Member of Indonesian House of Representatives
- Pengiran Mohammad – 2nd Minister of Religious Affairs of Brunei
- Ong Pang Boon – Minister for Education of Singapore
- S. Dhanabalan – Minister for Foreign Affairs of Singapore
- Abdul Sattar Murad – Minister of Economy for Afghanistan
- Lim Han Hoe – Unofficial Member of the Legislative Council of the Straits Settlements
- Lim Hock Siew – Singaporean political prisoner
- Shahbaz Gill – Chief of Staff to the Prime Minister of Pakistan
- Zaini Ahmad – Bruneian politician and rebel during the 1962 Brunei revolt

=== International and public service ===
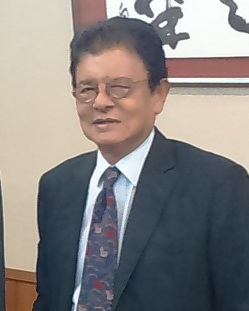
Razali Ismail, President of the United Nations General Assembly

==== International relations and foreign affairs ====
- Razali Ismail – 51st President of the United Nations General Assembly
- Ajit Singh – 9th Secretary General of the ASEAN
- Ku Jaafar Ku Shaari – 5th Secretary General of the D-8
- Raja Reza Zaib Shah – 5th Ambassador of Malaysia to Ukraine
- Fauziah Mohd Taib – 12th Ambassador of Malaysia to the Netherlands
- Mohd Jamil Johari – 9th High Commissioner of Malaysia to Brunei
- Dennis Ignatius – 10th High Commissioner of Malaysia to Canada
- Tommy Koh – Permanent Representative to the United Nations for Singapore
- Gopinath Pillai – High Commissioner of Singapore to Pakistan

==== Military, police and security ====
- Mohammed Hanif Omar – 4th Inspector-General of Police
- Norian Mai – 6th Inspector-General of Police
- Mohamad Fuzi Harun – 11th Inspector-General of Police
- Noor Rashid Ibrahim – 19th Deputy Inspector-General of Police
- Amar Singh Ishar Singh – Kuala Lumpur Chief of Police
- Mohd Asghar Khan Goriman Khan – 20th Chief of the Royal Malaysian Air Force
- Muhamad Norazlan Aris – 21st Chief of the Royal Malaysian Air Force
- Mohd Reza Mohd Sany – 17th Chief of the Royal Malaysian Navy
- Azhan Md Othman – 31st Chief of the Malaysian Army
- Azam Baki – 6th Chief Commissioner of the Malaysian Anti-Corruption Commission (MACC)
- Abdul Halim Aman – 7th Chief Commissioner of the Malaysian Anti-Corruption Commission (MACC)
- Jeewaka Ruwan Kulatunga – 3rd Chief of the Sri Lankan National Intelligence
- Ahmad Norihan Jalal – 17th Director-General of the Malaysian Defence Intelligence Organisation

==== Civil service ====
- Abdullah Mohd Salleh – 5th Chief Secretary to the Government of Malaysia
- Abdullah Ayub – 6th Chief Secretary to the Government of Malaysia
- Hashim Aman – 7th Chief Secretary to the Government of Malaysia
- Samsudin Osman – 11th Chief Secretary to the Government of Malaysia
- Mohd Sidek Hassan – 12th Chief Secretary to the Government of Malaysia
- Ali Hamsa – 13th Chief Secretary to the Government of Malaysia
- Ismail Bakar – 14th Chief Secretary to the Government of Malaysia
- Ahmad Kamil Jaafar – 8th Secretary General of the Ministry of Foreign Affairs
- Abdul Halim bin Ali – 9th Secretary General of the Ministry of Foreign Affairs
- Othman bin Hashim – 14th Secretary General of the Ministry of Foreign Affairs
- Muhammad Shahrul Ikram Yaakob – 16th Secretary General of the Ministry of Foreign Affairs
- Thong Yaw Hong – 6th Secretary General of the Ministry of Finance
- Mohd. Sheriff Mohd. Kassim – 8th Secretary General of the Ministry of Finance
- Clifford F. Herbert – 9th Secretary General of the Ministry of Finance
- Aris Bin Othman @ Osman – 10th Secretary General of the Ministry of Finance
- Samsudin B. Hitam – 12th Secretary General of the Ministry of Finance
- Izzuddin Bin Dali – 13th Secretary General of the Ministry of Finance
- Wan Abd Aziz bin Wan Abdullah – 14th Secretary General of the Ministry of Finance
- Mohd Irwan Serigar Abdullah – 15th Secretary General of the Ministry of Finance
- Asri bin Hamidon – 17th Secretary General of the Ministry of Finance
- Ramon Navaratnam – 6th Secretary General of the Ministry of Transport
- Othman B. Rijal – 9th Secretary General of the Ministry of Transport
- Long See Wool – 13th Secretary General of the Ministry of Transport
- Saripuddin Bin Hj. Kasim – 15th Secretary General of the Ministry of Transport
- Zulkefli A. Hassan – former Secretary General of the Ministry of Higher Education
- Murad Mohamed Noor – 5th Director-General of Education
- Abdul Rahman Arshad – 6th Director-General of Education
- Nor Zamani Abdol Hamid – 11th Director-General of Education
- Pkharuddin Ghazali – 12th Director-General of Education
- Husaini Omar – 8th Director-General of Higher Education
- K.Y. Mustafa – 7th State Secretary of Sabah
- Sukarti Wakiman – 8th State Secretary of Sabah

==== Law ====
===== Chief Justice of the Federal Court of Malaysia =====
- Mohamed Raus Sharif – 8th Chief Justice of Malaysia (1976)
- Tengku Maimun Tuan Mat – 10th Chief Justice of Malaysia (1982)

===== President of the Court of Appeal, Malaysia =====
- Mohamed Raus Sharif – 8th President of the Court of Appeal of Malaysia (1976)
- Ahmad Maarop – 10th President of the Court of Appeal of Malaysia (1978)
- Rohana Yusuf – 11th President of the Court of Appeal of Malaysia (1980)
- Abang Iskandar Abang Hashim – 12th President of the Court of Appeal of Malaysia (1983)
- Abu Bakar Jais - 13th President of the Court of Appeal of Malaysia (1986)

===== Chief Judge of the High Court of Malaya =====
- Ahmad Maarop – 10th Chief Judge of Malaya (1978)
- Zaharah Ibrahim – 11th Chief Judge of Malaya (1977)
- Azahar Mohamed – 12th Chief Judge of Malaya (1980)
- Mohamad Zabidin Mohd Diah, 13th Chief Judge of Malaya (1982)
- Hasnah Mohammed Hashim, 14th Chief Judge of Malaya (1983)
- Hashim Hamzah, 15th Chief Judge of Malaya (1985)

===== Chief Judge of the High Court of Sabah and Sarawak =====
- Abang Iskandar Abang Hashim – 6th Chief Judge of Sabah and Sarawak (1983)
- Abdul Rahman Sebli – 7th Chief Judge of Sabah and Sarawak (1983)

===== Attorney General of Malaysia =====
- Abdul Gani Patail – 6th Attorney General of Malaysia (1980)
- Idrus Harun – 9th Attorney General of Malaysia (1980)
- Ahmad Terrirudin – 10th Attorney General of Malaysia (1992)

===== Federal Court Judges =====
- Rhozariah Bujang – Judge, Federal Court of Malaysia (1985)
- Ahmad Terrirudin Mohd Salleh – Judge, Federal Court of Malaysia (1992)
- Lee Swee Seng - Judge, Federal Court of Malaysia (1984)
- Che Ruzima Ghazali - Judge, Federal Court of Malaysia (1985)
- Collin Lawrence Sequerah - Judge, Federal Court of Malaysia (LLM, 2006)
- Azimah Omar - Judge, Federal Court of Malaysia (1986)
- Ravinthran Paramaguru - Judge, Federal Court of Malaysia (1986)
- Azmi Ariffin - Judge, Federal Court of Malaysia (1987)
- Abu Samah Nordin – Judge, Federal Court of Malaysia (Rtd) (1976)
- Alizatul Khair Osman Khairuddin – Judge, Federal Court of Malaysia (Rtd) (1976)
- Aziah Ali – Judge, Federal Court of Malaysia (Rtd) (1976)
- Zainun Ali – Judge, Federal Court of Malaysia (Rtd) (1976)
- Balia Yusof – Judge, Federal Court of Malaysia (Rtd) (1977)
- Hasan Lah – Judge, Federal Court of Malaysia (Rtd) (1977)
- Badariah Sahamid – Judge, Federal Court of Malaysia (Rtd) (1978)
- Ramly Ali – Judge, Federal Court of Malaysia (Rtd) (1978)
- Zaleha Yusof – Judge, Federal Court of Malaysia (Rtd) (1979)
- Zawawi Salleh – Judge, Federal Court of Malaysia (Rtd) (1979)
- Idrus Harun – Former Judge of Federal Court of Malaysia (1980)
- Harmindar Singh Dhaliwal – Judge, Federal Court of Malaysia (Rtd) (1982)
- Zabariah Yusof – Judge, Federal Court of Malaysia (Rtd) (1982)
- Hanipah Farikullah, Judge, Federal Court of Malaysia (Rtd) (1983)
- Abdul Karim Abdul Jalil, Judge, Federal Court of Malaysia (Rtd) (1983)

===== Court of Appeal Judges =====
- Supang Lian – Judge, Court of Appeal, Malaysia (1983)
- Wong Kian Kheong – Judge, Court of Appeal, Malaysia (1988)
- Azman Abdullah – Judge, Court of Appeal, Malaysia (1985)
- Evrol Mariette Peters – Judge, Court of Appeal, Malaysia (1990)
- Mohd Radzi bin Abdul Hamid – Judge, Court of Appeal, Malaysia (1987)
- Muniandy A/L Kanyappan – Judge, Court of Appeal, Malaysia (1984)
- Azahari Kamal Ramli – Judge, Court of Appeal, Malaysia (1987)
- Amarjeet Singh – Judge, Court of Appeal, Malaysia
- Aliza Sulaiman – Judge, Court of Appeal, Malaysia
- Latifah Tahar – Judge, Court of Appeal, Malaysia
- Lim Yee Lan – Judge, Court of Appeal, Malaysia (Rtd) (1976)
- Zakaria Sam – Judge, Court of Appeal, Malaysia (Rtd) (1976)
- Yeoh Wee Siam – Judge, Court of Appeal, Malaysia (Rtd) (1977)
- Umi Kalthum Abdul Majid – Judge, Court of Appeal, Malaysia (Rtd) (1978)
- Has Zanat Mehat – Judge, Court of Appeal, Malaysia (Rtd) (1981)
- Wira Haji Ahmad Nasfy bin Yasin - Judge, Court of Appeal, Malaysia (Rtd) (1981)
- Nor Bee Ariffin – Judge, Court of Appeal, Malaysia (Rtd) (1981)
- Gunalan Muniandy – Judge, Court of Appeal, Malaysia (Rtd) (1981)
- S M Komathy Suppiah – Judge, Court of Appeal, Malaysia (Rtd) (1982)
- Suraya Othman – Judge, Court of Appeal, Malaysia (Rtd) (1982)
- Yaacob Sam – Judge, Court of Appeal, Malaysia (Rtd) (1982)
- Ahmad Zaidi Ibrahim – Judge, Court of Appeal, Malaysia (Rtd) (1982)
- Hadhariah Syed Ismail – Judge, Court of Appeal, Malaysia (Rtd) (1983)
- See Mee Chun – Judge, Court of Appeal, Malaysia (Rtd) (1983)
- Asmabi Mohamad – Judge, Court of Appeal, Malaysia (Rtd) (1984)
- Mariana Yahya – Judge, Court of Appeal, Malaysia (Rtd) (1984)

===== Other =====
- Ahmad Isa – 8th Attorney General of Brunei
- Steven Thiru – 31st President of the Malaysian Bar Council
- Muhammad Shafee Abdullah – Commissioner of the Human Rights Commission of Malaysia (1977)
- Saldi Isra – Justice of the Constitutional Court of Indonesia

=== Academia ===
Syed Muhammad Naquib al-Attas, pioneered the concept of Islamisation of knowledge

- Syed Muhammad Naquib al-Attas – Islamic scholar and philosopher
- Kassim Ahmad – Islamic philosopher, writer, and educator
- Shamsul Amri Baharuddin – anthropologist, Distinguished Professor of Social Anthropology, National University of Malaysia
- Harith Ahmad – physicist, Distinguished Professor of Physics, University of Malaya
- Khoo Kay Kim – historian, Emeritus Professor of History, University of Malaya
- S. Singaravelu – lawyer, Emeritus Professor of Indian Studies, University of Malaya
- Dame Margaret Clark – political scientist, Emeritus Professor of Politics, Victoria University of Wellington
- Lee Poh Ping – political scientist, Professor of Politics, University of Malaya and a recipient of the Order of the Rising Sun
- Wong Chin Huat - political scientist, Professor of Governance Studies, Sunway University
- Niyaz Ahmed - molecular epidemiologist, Professor of Life Sciences, University of Hyderabad
- Werry Darta Taifur – economist, Rector of Andalas University
- Mohd Kamal Hassan – Islamic scholar, 3rd Rector of International Islamic University Malaysia
- Syed Arabi Idid – journalist, 4th Rector of International Islamic University Malaysia
- Zaleha Kamarudin – lawyer, 5th Rector of International Islamic University Malaysia
- Ungku Aziz – economist, 3rd Vice-Chancellor of the University of Malaya
- Mohd Taib Osman – author, 9th Vice-Chancellor of the University of Malaya
- Abdullah Sanusi Ahmad - economist, 10th Vice-Chancellor of the University of Malaya
- Anuar Zaini Md. Zain – endocrinologist, 11th Vice-Chancellor of the University of Malaya
- Mohd. Amin Jalaludin – otologist, 15th Vice-Chancellor of the University of Malaya
- Ariffin Ngah Marzuki - surgeon, 2nd Vice-Chancellor of the National University of Malaysia
- Awang Had Salleh - sociologist, 5th Vice-Chancellor of the National University of Malaysia
- Sharifah Hapsah Syed Hasan Shahabudin - surgeon, 10th Vice-Chancellor of the National University of Malaysia
- Noor Azlan Ghazali - economist, 11th Vice-Chancellor of the National University of Malaysia
- Rayson Huang – chemist, 10th Vice-Chancellor of the University of Hong Kong
- Wang Gungwu – historian, 11th Vice-Chancellor of the University of Hong Kong
- Chuah Hean Teik – President of the Federation of Engineering Institutions of Asia and the Pacific (FEIAP), Former President and CEO of Universiti Tunku Abdul Rahman (UTAR)
- Mak Joon Wah – physician, Professor of Pathology and Vice President of International Medical University
- Megat Burhainuddin – physician, former Vice-Chancellor of Nilai University
- Tengku Rethwan – politician, Chairman of President College
- Khasnor Johan – author and historian
- Mohd Fadzilah Kamsah – lecturer and motivational speaker
- Yoke Khin Yap - physicist, materials scientist and academic

=== Business, corporate and economics ===
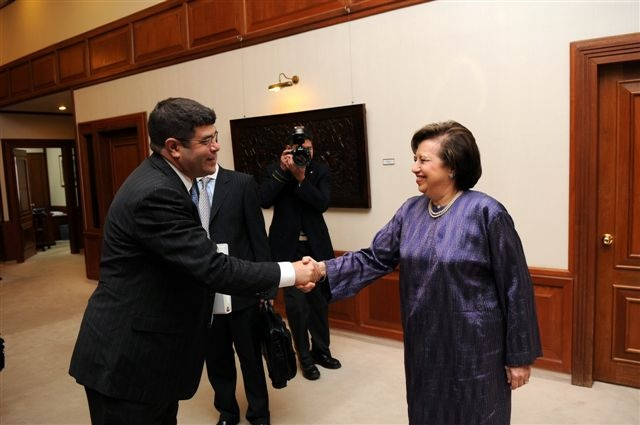
Zeti Akhtar Aziz, Governor of the Malaysian Central Bank

- Ali Abul Hassan bin Sulaiman – 6th Governor of Bank Negara Malaysia
- Zeti Akhtar Aziz – 7th Governor of Bank Negara Malaysia
- Muhammad bin Ibrahim – 8th Governor of Bank Negara Malaysia
- Shaik Abdul Rasheed Abdul Ghaffour – 10th Governor of Bank Negara Malaysia
- Nurhisham Hussein – Economic Adviser to the Prime Minister of Malaysia
- Azizan Zainul Abidin – President and CEO of Petronas
- Amirsham Abdul Aziz – President and CEO of Maybank
- Pahamin Rajab – Chairman and Co-Founder of AirAsia
- Ahmad Sarji Abdul Hamid – Chairman of Permodalan Nasional Berhad
- Mohd Daud Bakar – Chairman of the Shariah Advisory Councils of Bank Negara Malaysia and the Securities Commission of Malaysia
- Rozali Ismail – Founder and Executive Chairman of Puncak Niaga Holdings Berhad
- Mustapha Kamal Abu Bakar – Founder of MK Land Holdings Berhad
- Ter Leong Yap – Founder of Sunsuria Berhad
- Liew Kee Sin – Founder of SP Setia Berhad
- Chen Lip Keong – Founder of NagaCorp Ltd
- Teh Hong Piow – Founder and Chairman of Public Bank Berhad
- Lim Wee-Chai – Founder and Chairman of Top Glove Corporation Bhd
- G. Gnanalingam – Chairman of Westports Holdings
- Hasni Harun – Chairman of Gas Malaysia
- Abdul Aziz bin Husain – Chairman of Eksons Corporation Bhd
- Wong Teek Son – CEO and Executive Chairman of Riverstone Holdings Limited
- Oh Kuang Eng – Group CEO and Executive Chairman of Mi Technovation Berhad
- Ramanrao Abdullah – Group CEO of Deleum Group
- Eng Piow Tan – Group Managing Director of Mitrajaya Holdings Berhad
- Abdul Kadier Sahib – Member of the Board of Directors of Serba Dinamik Holdings Berhad
- Alireza Yaghoubi – Co-Founder of AirGo Design
- Syed Amin Aljeffri – Deputy President of the Malay Chamber of Commerce

=== Literature and the arts ===
- Muhammad Haji Salleh – writer and critic, 6th Sasterawan Negara
- Anwar Ridhwan – novelist, 10th Sasterawan Negara
- Baha Zain – writer, 12th Sasterawan Negara
- Zurinah Hassan – writer, 13th and first female Sasterawan Negara
- Siti Zainon Ismail – novelist, 14th Sasterawan Negara
- Faisal Tehrani – author and playwright, Anugerah Seni Negara winner
- Ayman Rashdan Wong – writer and geopolitical analyst, Anugerah Buku Negara winner
- Edwin Thumboo – poet and academician, 1979 Southeast Asian Writers Award winner
- Adibah Amin – columnist, 1983 Southeast Asian Writers Award winner
- Gopal Baratham – author and neurosurgeon, 1991 Southeast Asian Writers Award winner
- Catherine Lim – author, 1999 Southeast Asian Writers Award winner
- Rex Shelley – author and engineer, 2007 Southeast Asian Writers Award winner
- Malim Ghozali PK – novelist, 2013 Southeast Asian Writers Award winner
- Shirley Geok-lin Lim – poet, 1980 Commonwealth Poetry Prize winner
- Chuah Guat Eng – novelist, Malaysia's first English-language woman novelist
- Matussin Omar – novelist, 2012 Mastera Literary Award winner
- Lee Lee Lan – ballet dancer and choreographer
- Dinsman – poet
- Hilary Tham – poet
- Anis Sabirin – writer
- Uthaya Sankar SB – writer
- Ghulam-Sarwar Yousof – writer
- Daniel Dorall – sculptor

=== Science and medicine ===
- Faiz Khaleed – dentist, Malaysian astronaut candidate
- Siti Aisyah Alias – marine polar researcher, Deputy Director of the National Antarctic Research Centre (NARC)
- Awang Bulgiba Awang Mahmud – epidemiologist, first Malaysian doctor to be awarded a Doctor of Philosophy (PhD) in Health Informatics
- Salma Ismail – physician, first Malaysian Malay woman to qualify as a doctor
- Chen Su Lan – physician, one of the first medical school graduates in Singapore
- Mak Joon Wah – physician, director of the WHO Collaborating Centre for Lymphatic Filariasis
- T. A. Sinnathuray – obstetrician, Fellow of the Royal College of Surgeons
- Satwant Singh Dhaliwal – geneticist
- Swee Lay Thein – hematologist
- Susan Lim – parasitologist
- Gloria Lim – mycologist, former director of Singapore's National Institute of Education
- Malini Olivo – biotechnologist, Professor of Biophotonics at the National University of Ireland, Galway
- Kalai Mathee – microbiologist, Professor of Microbiology at the Florida International University
- Victor Lim – microbiologist, Pro Vice-Chancellor of International Medical University
- Chua Kaw Bing – pediatrician, discoverer of Nipah virus
- Mahaletchumy Arujanan – scientist, Global Director of the International Service for the Acquisition of Agri-biotech Applications (ISAAA)
- Augustine Ong – scientist, Fulbright Fellow

=== Sports ===
- Djohar Arifin Husin – Indonesian footballer, 16th Chair of the Football Association of Indonesia
- Shalin Zulkifli – Malaysian ten pin bowler, former World champion and ranked number one in Asia
- Tan Aik Mong – Malaysian badminton player, former Asian single's champion
- Yeoh Li Tian – Malaysian chess grandmaster and highest national rated player, Southeast Asian Games medalist
- Irfan Shamsuddin – Malaysian discus thrower, Southeast Asian Games medalist
- Jasmine Lai Pui Yee – Malaysian diver, Southeast Asian Games medalist
- Ooi Tze Liang – Malaysian diver, Asian Games medalist
- Bryan Nickson Lomas – Malaysian diver, Asian Games medalist
- Woon Khe Wei – Malaysian badminton player, Asian Games medalist
- Vivian Hoo Kah Mun – Malaysian badminton player, Asian Games medalist
- Haziq Kamaruddin – Malaysian sport archer, Asian Games medalist
- Pandelela Rinong – Malaysian diver, two-time Olympic Games medalist
- M. Magendran – Malaysian mountain climber, first Malaysian to conquer Mount Everest

=== Media and entertainment ===
- Dol Ramli – Founder of Radio Televisyen Malaysia (RTM)
- Sudirman Arshad – singer and songwriter, Asia's Number One Performer at the Salem Music Award London, 1989
- Vanida Imran – actress, model and television host
- Ernie Zakri – singer and actress
- Azwan Ali – media personality
- Najwa Latif - singer
- Rynn Lim – singer
- Victor Gu – newscaster
- Gary Yap – Malaysian television personality
- Aznil Nawawi – TV host and media personality
- Lee Han Jiet – stand-up comedian
- Uyaina Arshad – Actress, TV host and media personality
- Larissa Ping - model, fashion blogger and Miss World Malaysia 2018

=== Religion and activism ===
- Luqman Abdullah – 8th Mufti of the Federal Territories
- Fauwaz Fadzil – 9th Mufti of the Federal Territories
- Siti Hasmah Mohamad Ali – Spouse of the Prime Minister of Malaysia
- Anwar Fazal – social activist, 1982 Right Livelihood Award recipient
- Murugesan Sinnandavar - social activist and lawyer
- Charles Hector Fernandez – human rights advocate and lawyer
- Kem Ley – Cambodian activist and political commentator
- Sukumari Sekhar – women's rights advocate, Founder and Deputy President of the National Council of Women's Organizations, Malaysia
- Nalla Tan – women's rights advocate
- Janet Yee – child's rights activist
- Amani Williams Hunt Abdullah – social activist and Indigenous Malaysian lawyer

== Notable faculty ==
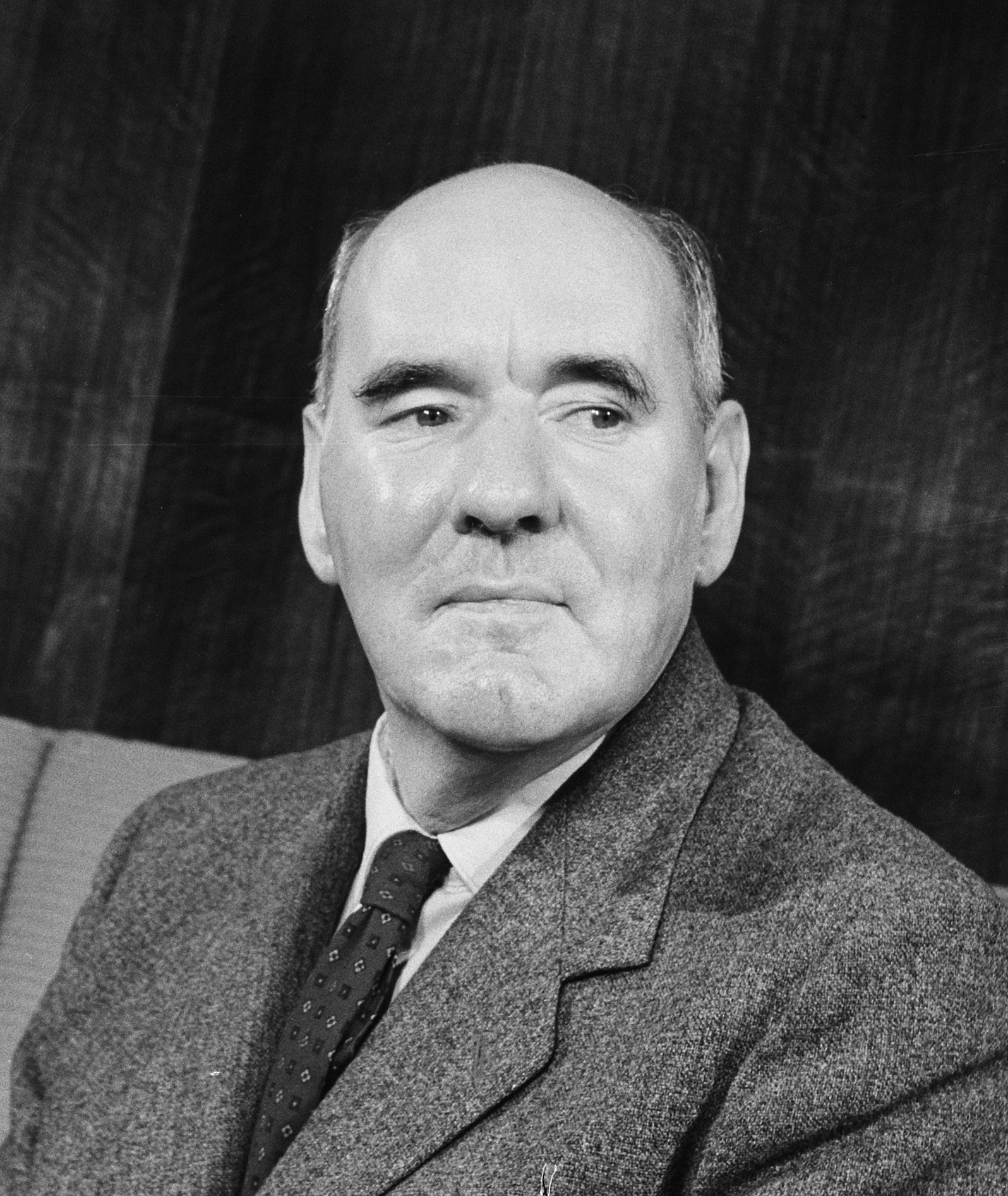
C. Northcote Parkinson, pioneered Parkinson's Law

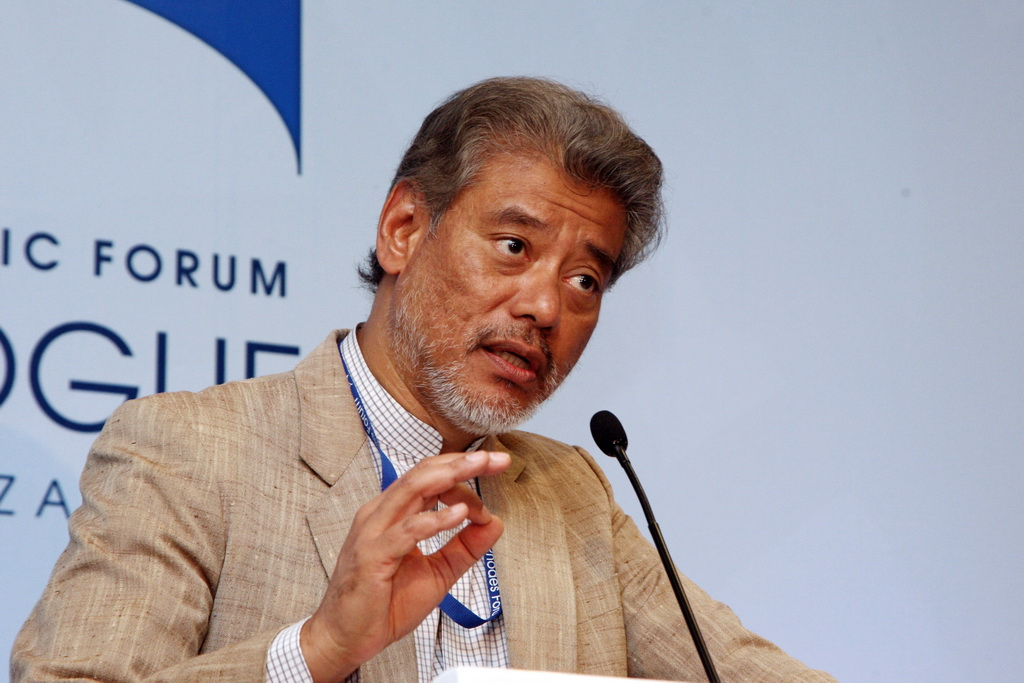
Jomo Kwame Sundaram, Member of the Malaysian Council of Eminent Persons

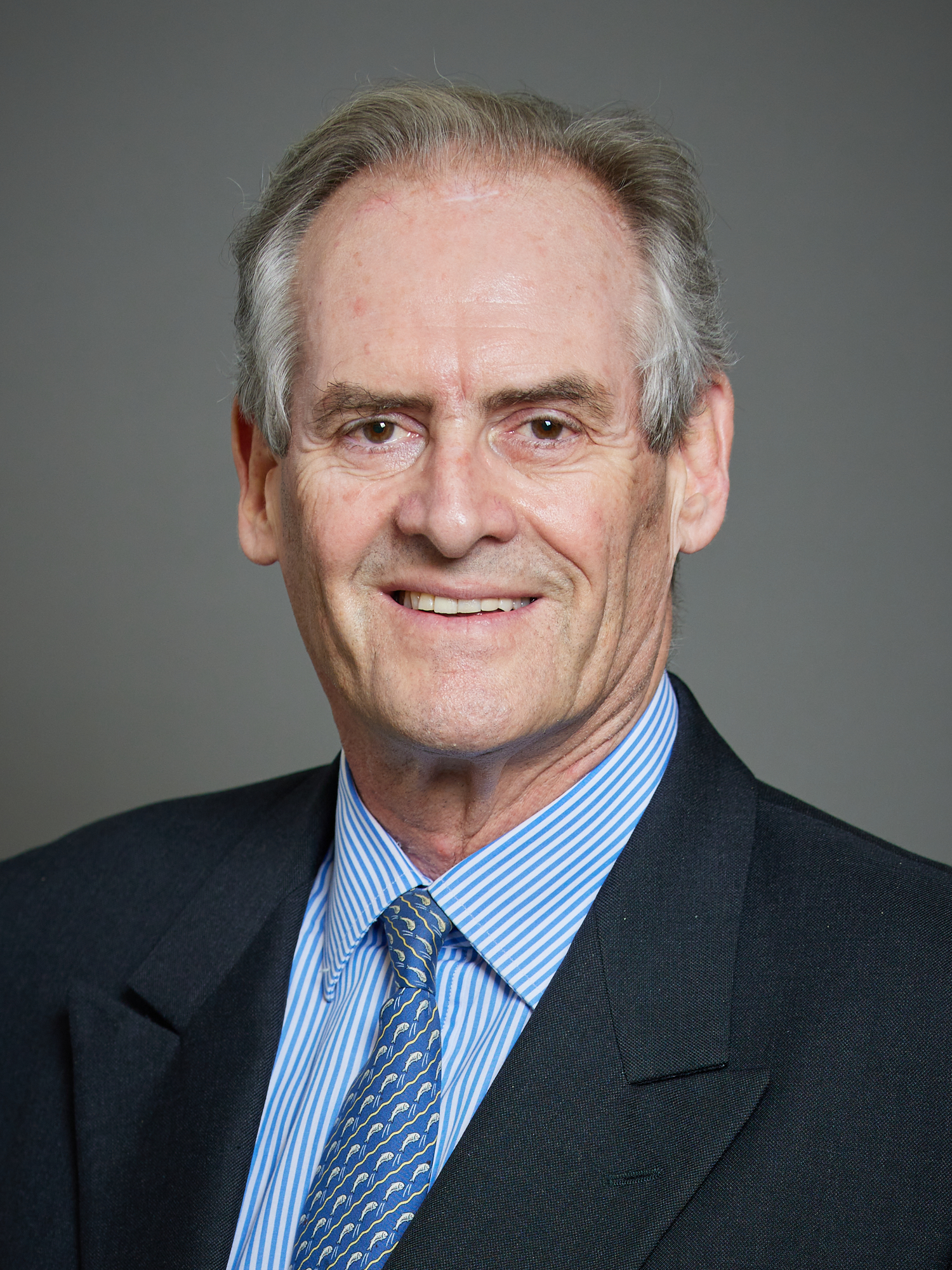
Jonathan Marks, Baron Marks of Henley-on-Thames, Member of the House of Lords

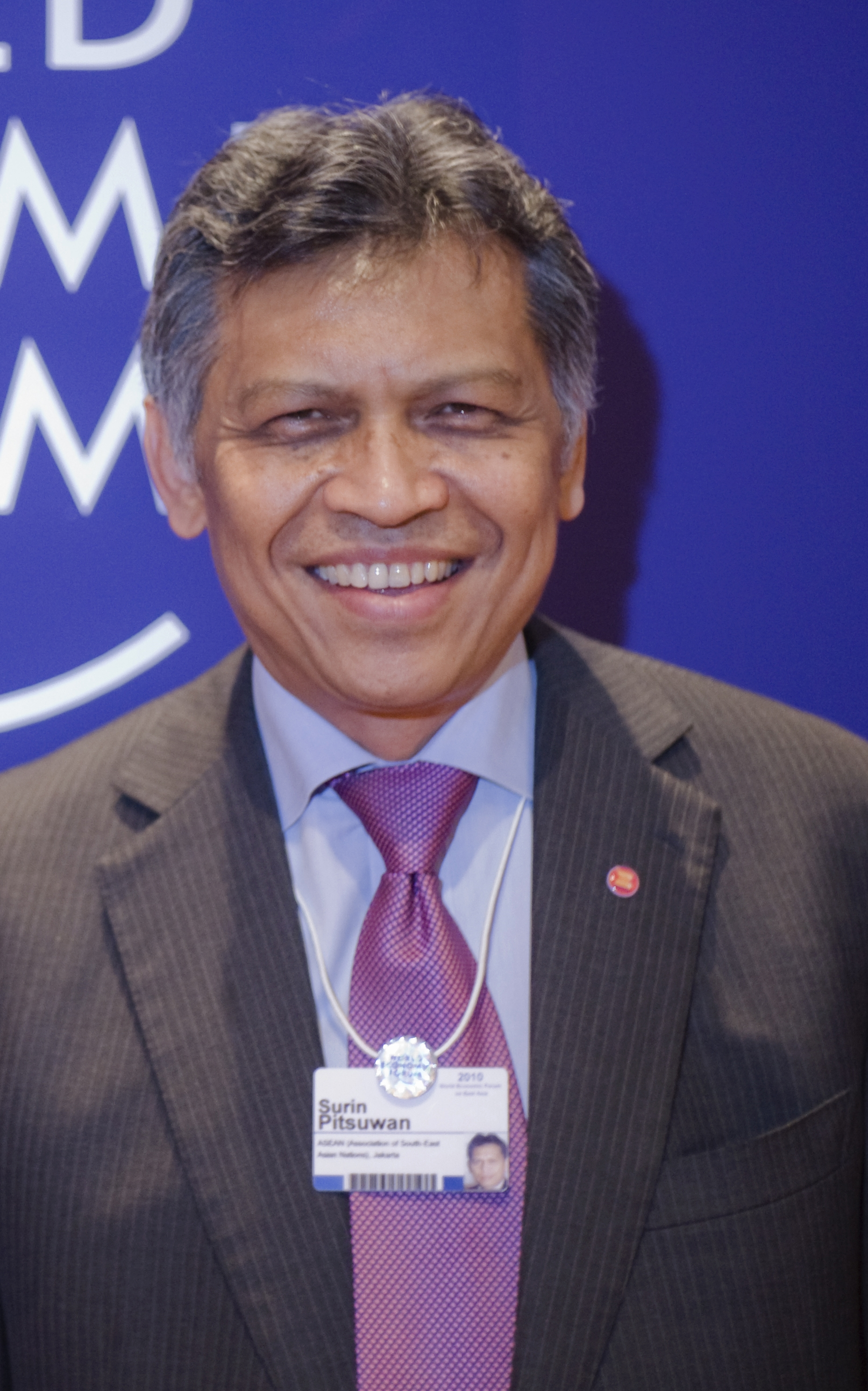
Surin Pitsuwan, Secretary General of ASEAN

- Pendeta Za'aba – Father of the Modern Malay Language
- Ch'ien Mu – One of the "Four Greatest Historians" of Modern China
- C. Northcote Parkinson – Founder of Parkinson's Law
- Malcolm MacDonald – 1st Governor-General of Kenya, Chancellor of the University of Malaya
- Sultan Nazrin Shah of Perak – Chancellor of the University of Malaya
- Yeoh Ghim Seng – 5th Speaker of the Parliament of Singapore, Professor of Surgery, University of Malaya
- Ahmad Mohamed Ibrahim – 1st Attorney General of Singapore, Dean of the Faculty of Law, University of Malaya
- Mohamad Ariff Md Yusof – 9th Speaker of the Dewan Rakyat
- Ramli Ngah Talib – 9th Governor of Penang, 8th Menteri Besar of Perak, 7th Speaker of the Dewan Rakyat
- Abdul Ghani Othman – 14th Menteri Besar of Johor, Dean of the Faculty of Economics, University of Malaya
- Fong Chan Onn – 2nd Minister of Human Resource, Dean of the Faculty of Economics, University of Malaya
- Syed Hussein Alatas – 1st President of the Parti Gerakan Rakyat Malaysia, 4th Vice-Chancellor of University of Malaya
- Md Hashim Yahaya – 4th Mufti of the Federal Territories, Director of the Academy of Islamic Studies, University of Malaya
- Cheong Choong Kong – Chairman of OCBC Bank and Chief Executive Officer of Singapore Airlines, Head of the Mathematics Department, University of Malaya
- Robert Holzmann – Governor of the Austrian Central Bank, Distinguished Research Fellow, University of Malaya
- Jeffrey Sachs – Royal Professor Ungku Aziz Chair in Poverty Studies at the Centre for Poverty and Development Studies, University of Malaya
- Jomo Kwame Sundaram – Ranking Member of the Council of Eminent Persons, Emeritus Professor of Economics, University of Malaya
- Chin Fung Kee – Emeritus Professor of Engineering, University of Malaya
- Asmah Haji Omar – Emeritus Professor of Malay Studies, University of Malaya
- Khairuddin Mohamed Yusof – Emeritus Professor of Medicine, former Deputy Vice-Chancellor of University of Malaya
- Lam Sai Kit – Emeritus Professor of Medicine, University of Malaya, prominent researcher of the Nipah virus
- Shad Saleem Faruqi – Emeritus Professor of Law, University of Malaya
- Muthucumaraswamy Sornarajah – Emeritus Professor of Law, National University of Singapore
- Paul Wheatley – Emeritus Professor of History and Geography, University of Chicago
- Anthony Reid Stanhope Reid – Emeritus Professor of History, Australian National University, Fukuoka Prize winner
- Michael Northcott – Emeritus Professor of Ethics, University of Edinburgh
- S. Arasaratnam – Emeritus Professor of History, University of New England (UNE)
- Klaus Rohde – Emeritus Professor of Zoology, University of New England (UNE), Clarke Medalist
- Amitav Acharya – Distinguished Professor of International Relations, American University
- Swapan Kumar Chakravorty – Distinguished Professor of Humanities, Presidency University, Kolkata
- Rajah Rasiah – Distinguished Professor of Economics, University of Malaya
- Kamal Salih – Professor of Economics, University of Malaya, Member of Parliament for Wangsa Maju
- Ajit Singh – Professor of Economics, University of Cambridge
- Farish A. Noor – Professor of History, University of Malaya
- Lloyd Fernando – Professor of English, University of Malaya
- Sutan Takdir Alisyahbana – Professor and Director of the Academy of Malay Studies, University of Malaya
- Leonard Andaya – Professor of Southeast Asian History, University of Hawaii at Manoa
- Lee Ellis – Professor of Sociology, Minot State University
- Syed Farid al-Attas – Professor of Sociology, National University of Singapore
- Saw Swee Hock – Professor of Statistics, National University of Singapore
- Kenelm Burridge – Professor of Anthropology, University of British Columbia, Fellow of the Royal Society of Canada
- James Danandjaja – Professor of Anthropology, University of Indonesia
- Hans Ras – Professor of Javanese Language and Literature, Leiden University
- Hans Köchler – Professor of Philosophy, University of Innsbruck, President of the International Progress Organization
- Sid Gray – Professor of International Business, University of Sydney Business School
- Keith Lewin – Professor of International Education and Development, University of Sussex
- Leonard Swidler – Professor of Catholic Thought and Interreligious Dialogue, Temple University
- Stanley Kalpage – Professor of Soil Science, University of Malaya, Ceylonese Senator
- Phang Siew Moi – Professor of Biological Science, University of Malaya
- Ghulam-Sarwar Yousof – Professor of Theatre Studies, University of Malaya
- Arifin Bey – Visiting Professor of Japanese History, University of Malaya
- Hector Kinloch – Fulbright Professor of US History, University of Malaya
- Andrew Sheng – Adjunct Professor of Economics, University of Malaya, Chairman of Securities and Futures Commission
- Tony Fernandes – Adjunct Professor of Business and Economics, University of Malaya, Founder of AirAsia
- Surin Pitsuwan – Adjunct Professor of Asia Europe Institute (AEI), University of Malaya, 12th Secretary General of ASEAN
- Wolfgang Drechsler – Honorary Professor at the Institute for Innovation and Public Purpose (IIPP), University College London
- Benjamin Clemens Stone – Honorary Professor of Botany, University of Malaya
- Azmi Sharom – Associate Professor of Law, University of Malaya, Deputy Chairman of the Election Commission
- Rustam Sani – Associate Professor of Sociology, University of Malaya
- Hans H. Indorf – Associate Professor of Political Science, East Carolina University
- The Reverend Xavier Thaninayagam – Dean of the Faculty of Arts and Social Science and Head of the Tamil Studies Department, University of Malaya
- Nik Safiah Karim – Dean of the Faculty of Arts and Social Science, University of Malaya
- Mary Turnbull – Head of the History Department, University of Hong Kong
- Nurmazilah Mahzan – Director of the Graduate Business School, University of Malaya and Chief Executive Officer of the Malaysian Institute of Accountants (MIA)
- Sheikh Zaki Badawi – Director of the Islamic Cultural Centre (ICC) and Chief Imam of the London Central Mosque
- François Pachet – Director of the Spotify Creator Technology Research Lab
- Mahadev Shankar – Judge of the Court of Appeal of Malaysia
- K. P. Ratnam – Member of the Ceylonese Parliament for Kilinochchi and Kayts
- Jonathan Marks, Baron Marks of Henley-on-Thames – Member of the House of Lords
- Tony Skyrme – physicist, Hughes Medalist
- Rupert Sheldrake – parapsychologist
- Chuah Joon Huang – President of Southern University College

== Honorary graduates ==
- Queen Rania Al Abdullah – the Queen of Jordan, Honorary Doctorate in International Relations
- Cyril Ramaphosa – 5th President of South Africa, Honorary Doctorate in International Relations
- Sultanah Hajah Bahiyah binti Almarhum Tuanku Abdul Rahman – the Queen of Malaysia and Sultanah of Kedah, Honorary Doctorate in Education
- Irina Bokova – Director General of UNESCO and Minister of Foreign Affairs for Bulgaria, Honorary Doctorate in Humanities
- Mohamed Suffian Mohamed Hashim – Lord President of the Federal Court, Honorary Doctorate of Letters
- Jeffrey Cheah – Chairman and Founder of the Sunway Group, Honorary Doctorate of Education
- Lee Boon Chim – Chairman of the Malaysia Derivatives Exchange and Malaysian Senator, Honorary Doctorate of Law
- Lee Kong Chian – Philanthropist and Founder of the Lee Foundation, Honorary Doctorate of Law
- Harussani Zakaria – Mufti of Perak, Honorary Doctorate in Shariah
- Richard Olaf Winstedt – President of Raffles College, Honorary Doctorate of Law
- Just Faaland – Director General of the International Food Policy Research Institute and formulator of the Malaysian New Economic Policy (NEP), Honorary Doctorate of Economics
- Philip Manson-Bahr – Director of the Department of Clinical Tropical Medicine, Honorary Doctorate in Medicine
- Rafael M. Salas – Head of the United Nations Population Fund (UNFPA), Honorary Doctorate
