= Yaghoubi =

Yaghoubi is an Iranian surname. Notable people with the surname include:

- Alireza Yaghoubi (born 1990), an Iranian entrepreneur, engineer, inventor, and designer
- Mehdi Yaghoubi (born 1930), an Iranian wrestler
- Mohammad Hadi Yaghoubi (born 1991), an Iranian footballer
- Moshtagh Yaghoubi (born 1994), a Finnish footballer
