= Brunei–Malaysia relations =

- Brunei: Malaysia

Diplomatic mission
- Bruneian High Commission, Putrajaya: Malaysian High Commission, Bandar Seri Begawan

Envoy
- High Commissioner Mahmud Saidin: High Commissioner Raja Reza Zaib Shah

Brunei and Malaysia established diplomatic relations in 1984. Brunei has a high commission in Putrajaya, as well as consulate-generals in Kota Kinabalu and Kuching. Malaysia maintains a high commission in Bandar Seri Begawan. Both countries are full members of ASEAN and the Commonwealth of Nations. The two countries share a land border on the island of Borneo. Both countries are majority ethnic Malays and maintain excellent and close economic, cultural, political and defence ties.

== Country comparison ==
Official name	Brunei Darussalam	Federation of Malaysia
Common name	Brunei	Malaysia
Flag	Brunei	Malaysia
Coat of Arms		
Population	469,900	36,383,073
Area	5,765 km^{2} (2,226 mi^{2})	330,803 km^{2} (127,724 mi^{2})
Population Density	72.11/km^{2} (186.8/sq mi)	92/km^{2} (240/sq mi)
Time zones	1	1
Capital & largest city	Bandar Seri Begawan – 100,700	Kuala Lumpur – 1,790,000
Government	Unitary Islamic absolute monarchy	Federal parliamentary elective constitutional monarchy
Established	17 September 1888 (Established as a protectorate by the British); 23 November 1971 (Self-government granted from the British Empire); 1 January 1984 (Independence from the British Empire proclaimed for Brunei)	31 August 1957 (Independence from the British Empire proclaimed for the Federation of Malaya); 16 September 1963 (Proclamation of Malaysia)
Predecessor States	Medieval Kingdom Period (1368–1888); Sultanate of Brunei (1368–1888) British Colonial Period (1888–1984); Protectorate of Brunei (1888–1941; 1946–1984) Japanese Occupation Period (1942–1945); Occupied British Borneo (1942–1945) Interim Military Period (1945–1946); Military Administration of Borneo (1945–1946) Independent Period (1984–present); Brunei Darussalam (1984–present)	Portuguese Colonial Period (1511–1641); Portuguese Malacca (1511–1641) Dutch Colonial Period (1641–1825); Dutch Malacca (1641–1795; 1818–1825) British Colonial Period (1771–1946); Straits Settlements (1826–1946); Federated Malay States (1895–1946); Unfederated Malay States (1909–1946); Raj of Sarawak (1841–1946); Crown Colony of Labuan (1848–1946); British North Borneo (1881–1946) Japanese Occupation Period (1942–1945); Occupied Malaya (1942–1945); Occupied British Borneo (1942–1945); Si Rat Malai (1943–1945) Interim Military Period (1945–1946); Military Administration of Malaya (1945–1946); Military Administration of Borneo (1945–1946) Self–Government Period (1946–1963); Malayan Union (1946–1948); Federation of Malaya (1948–1963); Crown Colony of North Borneo (1946–1963); Crown Colony of Sarawak (1946–1963) Federation Period (1963–present); Federation of Malaysia (1963–present)
First Leader	Muhammad Shah (historical); Hassanal Bolkiah (de jure)	Tuanku Abdul Rahman (Monarch); Tunku Abdul Rahman (Prime Minister)
Head of State	Monarch: Hassanal Bolkiah	Monarch: Ibrahim
Head of Government	Prime Minister: Hassanal Bolkiah	Prime Minister: Anwar Ibrahim
Deputy Leader	Crown Prince: Al-Muhtadee Billah	Deputy Agong: Nazrin Shah of Perak
Legislature	Legislative Council (Unicameral)	Parliament (Bicameral)
Upper House	none	Senate; President: Awang Bemee Awang Ali Basah
Lower House	none	House of Representatives; Speaker: Johari Abdul
Judiciary	High Court	Federal Court; Chief Justice: Tengku Maimun Tuan Mat
Official language	Malay	Malay
National anthem	Allah Peliharakan Sultan (God Bless the Sultan)	Negaraku (My Country)
Currency	Brunei dollar (B$)	Malaysian ringgit (RM)
National carrier	Royal Brunei Airlines	Malaysia Airlines
International airport	Brunei International Airport	Kuala Lumpur International Airport
Public broadcasting	Radio Television Brunei	Radio Television Malaysia
GDP (nominal)	$13.002 billion ($30,933 per capita)	$800.169 billion ($25,833 per capita)

== History ==
Relations between the two countries has been established since January 1984.

== Cultural links ==
Brunei and Malaysia have many similarities in culture especially in the East Malaysian areas as they were once a part of the Bruneian Empire. In 2011, around 61,470 Bruneians visited Malaysia while Brunei received 1,238,871 Malaysian tourists in 2013.

== Transport links ==
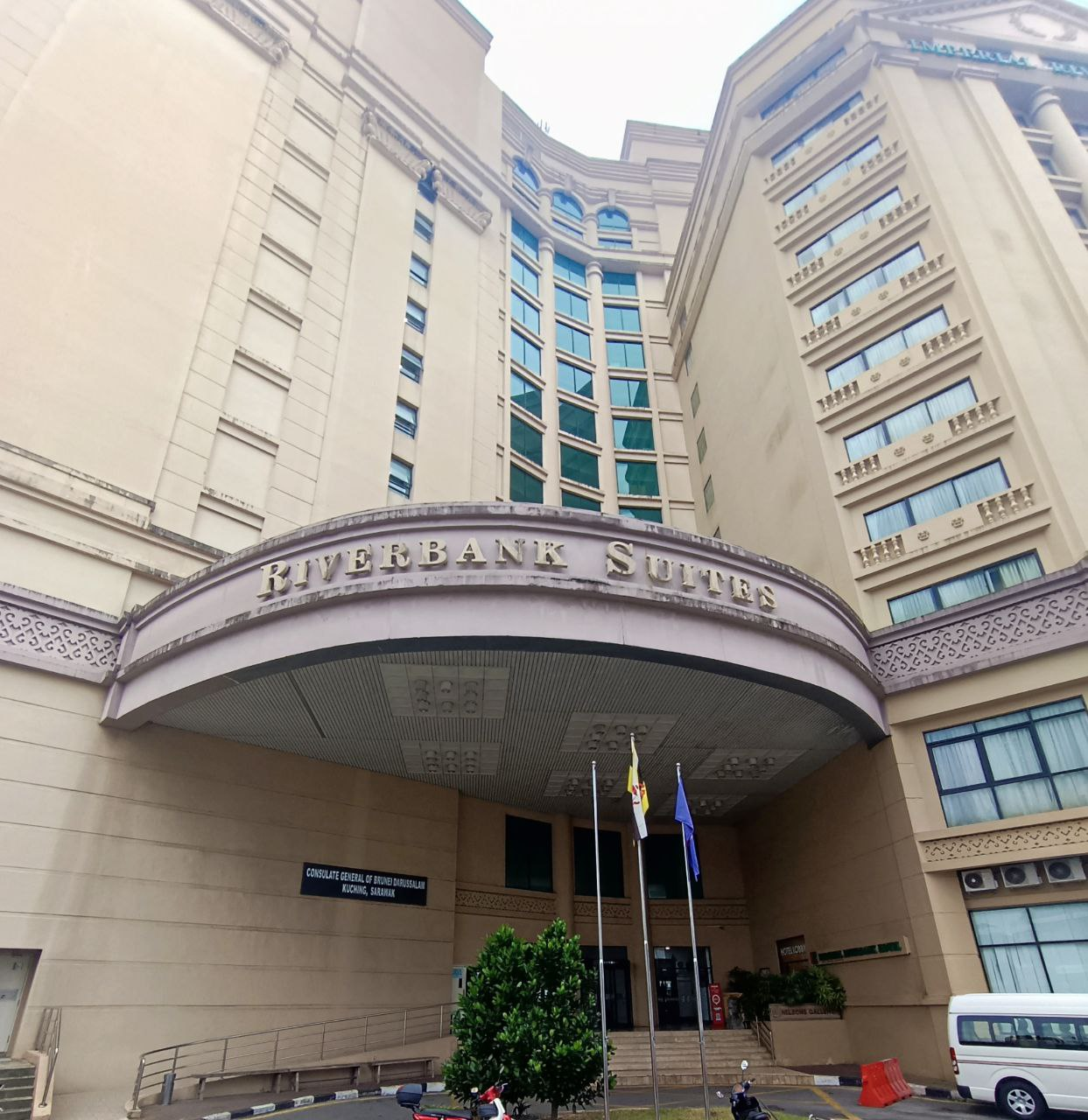
Consulate General of Brunei in Kuching, Sarawak.

The states of Sarawak and Sabah in East Malaysia are connected to Brunei via the Pan Borneo Highway through the Brunei–Malaysia Friendship Bridge.

== Disputes ==
Before 2009, Malaysia's land boundary with Brunei around Limbang was in dispute. Brunei and Malaysia agreed to cease gas and oil exploration in their disputed offshore and deep water seabeds until negotiations progressed into an agreement over allocation of disputed areas in 2003. In March 2009, it seemed a solution was achieved between the two governments when the Malaysian press reported that Brunei dropped all claims to Limbang, thus recognising it as a Malaysian territory. Brunei however immediately denied Malaysian press reports, saying the Limbang Question was never discussed during negotiations for the Exchange of Letters.

== See also ==
- Bruneian Malay people
- Malaysian Malays
- Brunei–Malaysia border
