= Sultanah Asma School =

- Sekolah Menengah Kebangsaan Sultanah Asma

Location
- Alor Setar, Kedah; Malaysia; 6.12°N 100.38°E

Information
- Other name: SAS
- Type: Secondary school
- Motto: Unggul dan Terbilang (Eminent and distinguishe)
- Established: 1922
- Founder: Tunku Ibrahim
- School district: Alor Setar
- Principal: Noor Ashikin binti Yusoff
- Forms: 1-5
- Gender: Coeducational
- Language: Malay, English
- Colours: Yellow and Blue

Sekolah Menengah Kebangsaan Sultanah Asma or Sultanah Asma School is the first all-female school in the state of Kedah.The school is noted for being influential in providing female Malay access to formal education in Malaysia.In 2010, the school were awarded among the pioneer Sekolah Berprestasi Tinggi.

== History ==
The school is established in 1922 as Kampung Bharu Girls School by Tunku Ibrahim, the first child of Sultan Abdul Hamid.His effort was supported by Tengku Sulong, Syed Ahmad Jitra, Syed Mohd Idid, Ismail Puteh and E.A.G Stuart, then Superintendent of Education. At early days, the school was situated at Che Seperanda Palace, one of the wives of Sultan Abdul Hamid after her death. On the first year of establishment, around 30 students, headed by its headmaster, Miss C.D Wadell. She was assisted by Miss Intan and Miss Rahmah. The students at that time were exclusively from Kedah royalty and high rankings officials families.

During Japanese occupation in Kedah, the school buildings were used as their fire station headquarters.

On 30 January 1954, Tunku Ampuan Asma, then the queen of Kedah, put the cornerstone of the campus located in Jalan Langgar, at the front of Derga Mosque. She also renamed the school to Sultanah Asma School. Three years later, on 21st July 1957, Sultan Badlishah officiated the new building.

On 1959, the school were separated between its elementary and secondary school.

In 2010, the school received the High Performance School award. The school is specialised in band, poetry and songs.

== Notable students ==
- Salma Ismail - First Malaysian Malay woman doctor
- Zurinah Hassan - Malaysian 13th National Laureate
- Zakiah Hanum Abd Hamid - Former director of National Archives of Malaysia, first female to lead Malaysian national bodies
- Mashitah Ibrahim - Former Deputy Minister in the Prime Minister's Department
- Sivasangari Subramaniam - Current world No 5 squash player
