= S. Singaravelu =

Malaysian Indologist and lawyer (1936–2020)

Professor Dr S Singaravelu
- Born: Singaravelu Sachithanantham; 22 December 1936; Thopputhurai, Chennai, India
- Died: 13 January 2020 (aged 83); Petaling Jaya, Selangor, Malaysia
- Occupation(s): Indologist and lawyer
- Title: Professor Emeritus

Academic background
- Education: University of Madras, University of Malaya in Singapore (B.A.) University of Malaya, Kuala Lumpur (M.A.) (PhD) University of London (L.L.B.)
- Alma mater: University of London

Academic work
- Discipline: Indology
- Notable works: The Ramayana Tradition in South-East Asia, The Social Life of the Tamils, Thirukkural Trilingual

Singaravelu Sachithanantham (22 December 1936 – 13 January 2020) was a Malaysian Indologist and lawyer. He was Professor Emeritus at the University of Malaya.

== Early life and education ==
Singaravelu Sachithanantham was born in Thopputhurai, Chennai in India on 22 December 1936. He obtained three Bachelor of Arts degrees: his first in Economics, History and Tamil from the University of Madras in 1957; his second in Economics, History and Indian Studies from the University of Malaya (Singapore) in 1959, and his third in Indian Studies (First Class Honours) from the University of Malaya in 1960. He received his M.A. and PhD in 1965 and 1981 respectively, both from University of Malaya.

== Career ==
After retiring from full time academia, he pursued a legal career as an Advocate and Solicitor in the Malaysian High Courts, having obtained his Bachelor of Laws (LLB) Honours degree as an external candidate at the University of London in 1989 and called to the Bar on 24 November 1995.

Singaravelu was professor of Indian Studies in the Faculty of Arts and Social Sciences, University Malaya from 1980, becoming Professor Emeritus from 2004. He wrote extensively about Indian, Tamil and South-East Asian culture, and served as Head of Department of Indian Studies, University Malaya between 1969 and 1984. His notable works include The Ramayana Tradition in South-East Asia, The Social Life of the Tamils and Thirukkural Trilingual (a classic Indian text translated into English and Malay). He was one of the first lecturers in University Malaya to teach Indian Studies courses in Bahasa Malaysia (the Malay language) in addition to the requisite Tamil and English, which enabled a wider stream of students to pursue courses such as Tamil Culture and Civilisation in Malaysia's national language. Under the guidance of his mentor Professor Xavier Thaninayagam, he began researching links between Indian culture and South East Asia. His Ph.D. thesis on the Ramayana Tradition compared in detail the original literary Ramayana of Valmiki version in Sanskrit with the later Tamil version of Kambaramayanam, the Malay literary version Hikayat Seri Rama and the Thai Ramakien of King Rama I.

== Death ==
Singaravelu died on 13 January 2020 at his home in Petaling Jaya, Selangor at the age of 83.

== Honours ==
He was made a Companion of the Order of Loyalty to the Royal Family of Malaysia in 1991.
