= Haus Steineck =

Haus Steineck was originally the summer home of the Stein family of Cologne. Until 2008 it was owned by the Kingdom of Saudi Arabia. "Auf der anderen Seite der Fährstrasse steht das stattliche Haus Steineck, eine frühere Sommervilla der Familie Stein aus Köln. Nach verschiedenen Besitzern war es zuletzt als Gästehaus des Königreich Saudi-Arabien."

"About two decades ago [1954?], a non-profit organization incorporated itself for the purpose of furthering international understanding through civic education. To implement its programs, Haus Steineck was acquired and converted in an institute where groups of all nationalities could meet and exchange their views. Ever since, students, functionaries, trade unionists and many other political and professional groups have gathered at Haus Steineck for informal discussions, lecture series and social get-togethers. The impact of its activities has carried the name and reputation of the institute far beyond the geographical confines of Bonn... Haus Steineck and its facilities are superbly suited for accommodating the ECU campus abroad. The three-story building is in a secluded location- accessible only by way of a dead-end lane and guarded by a stand of ancient oak trees on one side and the swirling waters of the Rhine on the other. It was formerly the manor house of a large estate, and its architecture as well as its interior design testify to its regal past."

By July 1955, the Junge Union of Germany held a meeting at Haus Steineck, because they could not afford a more expensive location. during these days, the home was called "Jugendhaus Steineck."

== History ==
Haus Steineck, also known as "East Carolina University- Bonn, West Germany" and "ECU-Bonn" or the "European Study Center" or the "Europäisches Institut Deutschlands" was an experimental school operating under East Carolina University between 1971 and 1973. The location of the school was in the gracious summer home, "Haus Steineck, at 82 Rüdigerstrasse, in Bonn-Bad Godesberg, Germany." The students were enrolled in East Carolina University, and the faculty were visiting professors from the same school.

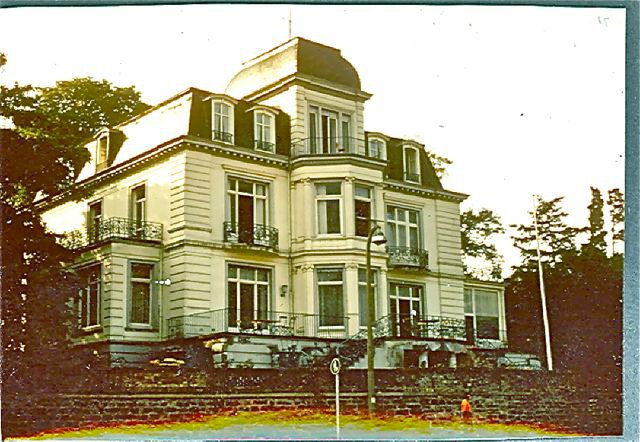
Haus Steineck, Bonn-Bad Godesburg, Germany, 1971

The main purpose of the school was to give formal classroom instruction, as well as site visits to the European countries. As such, each month the school would transport the students to various cities around Europe, where the students would interview artists, businessmen, geographers, historians and politicians in the different countries. "According to Dr. Hans Indorf, coordinator of the European Studies Program, Bonn was chosen as the location for ECU's foreign campus because of its accessibility to such European cities as London, Copenhagen, Amsterdam, Brussels, Berlin, Paris, Luxembourg, Bern and Vienna. The Center itself is in a suburb of Bonn, Germany, across the river from the Seven Mountains or Siebengebirge and the resort city of Königswinter."

Special courses were required each academic session: European Area Seminar and European Field Study. The European Area Seminar was an inter-disciplinary exploration of European problems. It included an extended reading program and culminated in a term paper. The European Field Study included interviews and research at political institutions, social organizations and industrial establishments.

== Instructional Facilities ==
All classes were held on the first floor of the mansion. The large classroom could hold all forty students with tables arranged in horseshoe fashion. The instructor's area included a raised platform, a blackboard, a piano and other instructional equipment. Small group discussions and seminars were conducted in the book lined seminar room, which seated about fifteen people, and provided views of the Rhine and the mountains beyond.

== Library ==
The area next to the Seminar Room on the first floor held the library. The collections consisted of several hundred pertinent books, in English, selected by the instructors to support the educational program. Most of the materials were selected from the J.Y. Joyner Library Collection in ECU, and shipped from there. Students also availed themselves of the texts needed from the University of Bonn, especially for materials in many languages. Research materials will mostly be copied from government and society archives that were collected during visits to various institutions. Textbooks for the courses of study were also part of the library collection. Various European and local newspapers and journals supplemented the library collection. The students were encouraged to bring reference works, a thesaurus, a language dictionary and recreational reading materials. Many of these were donated by the students to the library at the end of the year.

== Common Rooms ==
Haus Steineck had a large reception hall outside of the dining hall that was used on formal occasions as well as for informal meetings. Several parties, such as a "1950's Rock and Roll Party" were held here to entertain the students and their guests. The seminar room, library and even the classrooms were often used after the hours of formal instruction, either to watch German TV, to read or to hold quiet discussions.

== Stübchen ==
The Stübchen, or the "Cozy Room," was in the basement. It held a refrigerator, a bar, several tables and wooden benches. This is where song fests, card games and intense literature, political and religious discussions went on far into the night.

== Sleeping Quarters ==
Sleeping quarters were on the second and third floors. Each bedroom was supplied with from two to four beds, one or two wash basins, a table with chairs and a clothes cabinet.

== 1971-1972 School Year ==
"About 40 students studied and lived in a three-story boarding house, "Haus Steineck," for the academic year 1971-1972. ECU faculty were shuttled to this site and taught several subjects as well as special seminars that involved interviews with government officials and trade union leaders... The school was the brain child of [political science professor] Dr. Hans Indorf." The educational excursions for this year included: September- Germany; October- France; November- England; December- Belgium; December- Soviet Union; January- Berlin and East Germany; February- Hamburg; April- Spain; May- Netherlands. All in all, the students traveled more than 17,000 miles through Europe. As Dr. Hans Indorf said, "The year's voyages took us some 17,000 miles by plane, bus, train and boat, but it was farther still in terms of experience, education and undeniable fun."

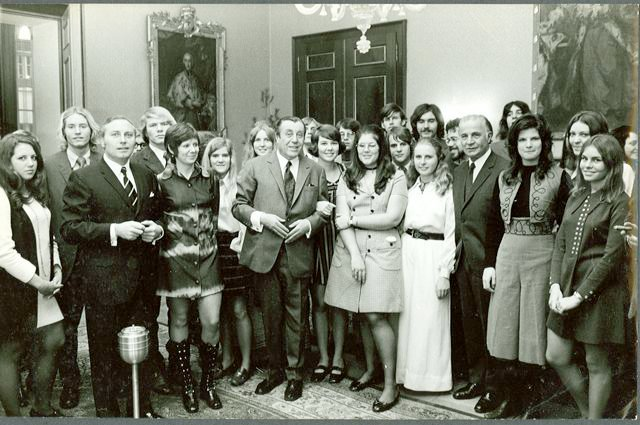
Class at a reception with the Peter Kraemer, the Bürgermeister (Mayor) of Bonn, Germany in September, 1972. Dr. Hans Indorf is in the dark suit on the left.

"At an invitation and expense of the North Atlantic Treaty Organization (NATO), the ECU students traveled to the European capital of Brussels, Belgium, for a four day visit." The students were then given a tour of the Supreme Headquarters Allied Powers Europe (SHAFE), in Mons, Belgium. "Following the tour of the SHAFE Community, we attended lectures presented by leading military officials and were shown an unclassified Russian movie produced in Moscow during the 50th Celebration of the Russian Revolutions. The last half hour of our morning briefing session was a 'question and vague answer' period conducted by an American Army colonel who was quoted as saying, 'I have an answer for that question, but the answer is classified!'"

The students in the 1971-1972 school year were: Mike Allen; Gene Ayscue; Gail Benge; Suzy Berry; Leigh Blount; Harriett Brinn; Tom Brooke; Bebe Broome; Sue Cande; Don Davenport; Paul Dulin; Beverly Eubank; Anne Gant; Donald Gerock; David Gradis; Mark Griffiths, Fay Gygi; Lee Hadden; Lee Handsel; Stan Harris; Carol Hawkins; Ed Hereford; Len Jordab; Allan Kearney; Cindy Maultsby; Sue MacDonald; Debby Mitchell; Pam Murphy; Sheila Nicholson; Joe Norris; Martin Paulsen; Steve Polifko; Cheryl Pope; Christy Prange; Gordy Quill; Cabell Regan; Viv Swepston; Juani Wehmer; Diana Winfree.

The faculty were: Dr. Ralph E. Birchard; Associate Professor of Geography; PhD. University of Iowa; Fellow of the Oklahoma Academy of Science; director of the European summer program in geography; extensive travels in Europe; two years of university teaching in Ethiopia.

Dr. Loren K. Campion; Associate Professor of History; Ph.D. Indiana University; studied at LMU Munich; author of "The Restless Mind of the German Military, 1890"; extensive travel in Germany.

Mr. Tran Gordley; Professor and assistant dean, School of Art; Chairman of ECU Department of Painting; Master of Fine Arts, University of Oklahoma; participant in numerous art exhibitions; directed European Travel-Study Tour in 1969.

Dr. Joseph A. Hill; Professor of Business Administration and Chairman of the ECU Department of Business Administration; Ph.D. University of Florida; six years of study in Mexico; one year of residence in Germany and extensive travel through Europe; publications on Mexican Mutual Funds and the Manpower Development and Training Act.

Dr. Clyde Hiss; Associate Professor of Voice; Director of Opera Theatre; DMA, University of Illinois; extensive travel in Europe.

Dr. Hans H. Indorf; Resident Director, ECU-Bonn. Associate Professor of Political Science, Ph.D. New York University; editor of the journal, "Politics '71"; director of European summer session on West European political processes; eight years with the Institute of International Education and the Ford Foundation on European and Asian assignments.

Dr. William F. Troutman; Professor of Political Science and Chairman of the ECU Department of Political Science; Ph.D. Duke University; has taught at Gardner-Webb College; Atlantic Christian College; Appalachian State University.

Mrs. Pia Sandstedt;

== 1972–73 ==
The 1972–73 school year covered seven academic disciplines: Art, Geography, Business Administration and Economics, History, Sociology and Anthropology, Music and Political Science. The Area Seminar and Field Research Study courses were taken by all the students.

"But soon, our attention turned to the internal affairs of Haus Steineck. It was more than just dormitory living. The comfort of room, table, and laundry service was supplemented by self-help programs. There were a roast-pig cookout, a find-your-sock scramble after laundry distribution, a name-the-game at dinner time, a beat-the-next competition for the hot shower, and a frantic search for personal belongings after an invasion of German orderliness. The location of our Center was superb in many respects. A Strassenbahn ride took us into Bonn, a brief train ride to Cologne and Coblenz. Football was played on the green embankment of the Rhine, where the fast flowing river carried barges from many lands, and a frisbee from Greenville! With students and faculty occupying the same premises, the inducement for learning -- and accommodation -- was ever present. A busy student government initiated activities, set standards for conduct (happily ignored), and operated some of the facilities, including a liquid concession stand. The mood of participation produced over the year two student presidents, one king, and two resident directors."

The 46 students attending in the 1972-1973 school year were: Lynee Burch Barrett; Don Calvin Bass; Steven Eugene Billett; David Warren Boone; Paula Hart Brewer; James Micheal Brown; Richard Charles Brown; Constance Marie Bumgarner; Richard Scott Calvin; Cynthia Scott Carriker; Kirsty Lyn Dodd; Jerry richard Dominey; William Lee Farmer; Edwin Grier Ferguson; Sophie Marie Foreman; James Brian Higgins; Charles Walter Hulka; Kathryn Elizabeth Johnston; Robert Vernon Lucas; Jack Jethro Miller; Mary Ann Mitchener; Noelle Marie Nelson; John Raymond Palmer; France Rebecca Robinson; Earl Dudley rouse; Cynthia Lee Sherard; David anthony Autton; Sheila Lynne Thrower; Kevin James Walker; Deborah Sue Adkins; April Denise Andrews; Richard Reed Barefoot;Charlotte Brummal Belote; Elizabeth Diane Burgess; Phillips Hirst Hewett; Jennifer Lynn Johnson; Karen Elaine McCoy; Brenda Kay Kerby; Katherine Hawes King; Terry Anne Langford; Cathy Anne Marlowe; Richard franklin Marriner; Reseanna McDougald; Sharon Lynn Stokes; Janet Reed Ripley.

The faculty for the 1972–73 sessions were: Dr. Brian Bennett; Dr William Collins; Dr. Ennis Chestang; Dr. Kathleen E. Dunlop; Dr. Emily Farnham; Dr. Hans Indorf "The greatest organizer we know, a man who plays a mean game of ping-pong, and every inch a leader, right down to the tips of his tiger paws."; Dr. Catherine Murphy; Mrs. Pia Samstedt, "Our favorite secretary and good friend who is Punctual, Industrious, Attractive, and knows how to scare the wits out of people some early morning in December."."; Dr. Henry Wanderman.

== Program's End ==
The experiment in the "reiseschule" or "educational travel school" ended with the 1973 school year. The economic situation had changed so much, with the Deutsche Mark increasing in value against the US Dollar, that the school was no longer viable. Some students were unable to stay the full academic year, and others could only afford to come for the spring semester. For another few years, the Haus Steineck was used to house temporarily students from ECU who stayed there during visits to Europe. Several classes were held there from six weeks to two months in length.

In summation, the program was an academic success. Unlike most other American university overseas programs at the time, this one was not associated with another university, and did not require working knowledge of other languages. As such, the instruction and readings were in English, which helped greatly with understanding the subject matter. Also, the frequent trips, some to communist countries such as East Germany and the Soviet Union, were also not that common among American university programs. This allowed an unusual scope of instruction and experience, that made this program unique and satisfactory.

== Bibliography ==
- "ECU Plans Campus in Bonn, Germany, for Fall 1971." News Bureau, East Carolina University, Greenville, North Carolina. September, 1971.
- European Diary. 1973. East Carolina University. Department of Political Science. May 29- July 9, 1973. 45 pages.
- European Diary. 1976. East Carolina University. Department of Political Science. May 31-July 10, 1976.
- European Study Center. 1972. "One Year's Experience 1971-1972." European Study Center, East Carolina University.
- European Study Center; East Carolina University 1972-1973. Printed by Morgan Printers, Greenville, NC. 1973.
- "European Study Center 1972-1973"
- East Carolina University European Study Center, Bonn- Germany, 1971-1972. Office of International Studies, ECU, Greenville, NC. 1971.
- 1972-1973 Bonn- Germany European Study Center, East Carolina University. Office of International Studies, East Carolina University, Greenville, NC. 1972.
- Hadden, Lee and Martin J. Paulsen, Jr. 1971. "Lord Mayor Honors ECU-Bonn Students." The Fountainhead. Volume III, number 21, December 16, 1971. Page 2.
- "Haus Steineck." 1954. Volkshochschule im Westen. Zeitschrift des Deutschen Volkshochschul-Verbandes. Volume 6 (1-2). Page 26 et seq.
- "Haus Steineck in Mehlem." 1985. Godesberger Heimatblätter Heft 23. Page 244 et seq. Herausgeber: Verein für Heimatpflege und Heimatgeschichte e.V. Erscheinungsjahr: 1985.
- Hereford, Carl "Eddie". 2012. "We Were in Germany before Italy." East: The Magazine of East Carolina University. Volume 10, number 3, Spring 2012. Page 3.
- Lageplan des Hauses Steineck in Mehlem. 1971.
- "Russians Impress Students in Moscow." 1972. The Fountainhead. Volume III, number 35, March 6, 1972. Page 2.
- "Students Take Excursion; Tour London Sights." 1972. The Fountainhead. Volume III, number 35, March 6, 1972. Page 2.
