= Sukarti Wakiman =

Yang Berbahagia Tan Sri Datuk Seri Panglima Sukarti Wakiman PSM SPDK JP

State Secretary of Sabah
- In office 3 July 2008 – 8 July 2018
- Governor: Ahmadshah Abdullah; Juhar Mahiruddin
- Preceded by: KY Mustafa
- Succeeded by: Hashim Paijan

Personal details
- Born: 9 January 1956 (age 70) Labuan, Crown Colony of North Borneo (now Sabah, Malaysia)
- Party: Independent
- Spouse: Hairani Hussaini
- Education: University of Malaya
- Occupation: Public servant

Sukarti bin Wakiman was the 8th State Secretary of Sabah from 3 July 2008 to 8 July 2018.

He was born and bred in Labuan to an ethnic Malay family of two parents with distinct ethnic ancestries, being born to an ethnic Javanese immigrant father from Java, Indonesia and his local-born ethnic Bruneian Malay wife.

== Educational background ==
Sukarti started his education in Kerupang Primary School of Labuan in 1961, before he continued his study at Sabak Bernam Secondary School, Selangor in 1967, and Sekolah Alam Shah, Kuala Lumpur in 1970.

In 1974, he continued his studies at University of Malaya and got a Bachelor of Arts in Sociology and Anthropology in 1977.

== Career ==
He joined State Public Service on 15 July 1977 as Manpower Officer at Sabah Ministry of Manpower and Environment Development, before promoted to the same post as the senior one. In 1980, he was appointed Administrative Officer in the state ministry.

On 25 September 1981, he was promoted as Ceremonial and Protocol Officer at Ceremonial and Protocol Division, Chief Minister's Department, before transferred to State Development Department as Senior Administrative Officer of Coordination on 1 September 1984.

After 23 days, he was chosen to hold the office of the Private Secretary to the State Governor, Mohd. Said Keruak, until 6 May 1994. He was then promoted to the post of the Permanent Secretary in the State Ministry of Fishery and Agriculture (on 7 May 1994) and in the State Ministry of Rural Development (on 16 May 1996). On 23 March 1998, he was appointed the Director of State Public Service and reappointed back to the same post once again on 24 April 2000. Before that, on 13 January 2000, he was appointed the Permanent Secretary of Infrastructure Development.

On 3 July 2008, he was sworn in as the 8th Secretary of State of Sabah succeeding KY Mustafa. He retired on 8 July 2018 and was replaced by Hashim Paijan.

== Honours ==
- Malaysia
  - Companion of the Order of Loyalty to the Crown of Malaysia (JSM) (2002)
  - Commander of the Order of Loyalty to the Crown of Malaysia (PSM) – Tan Sri (2012)
- Sabah
  - Commander of the Order of Kinabalu (PGDK) – Datuk (1994)
  - Grand Commander of the Order of Kinabalu (SPDK) – Datuk Seri Panglima (2010)
  - Justice of the Peace (JP) (2020)

== Family ==
He is married to Hairani Hussaini, a Bajau native of Tuaran and is currently settled there alongside with their nuclear family.
