= Hans H. Indorf =

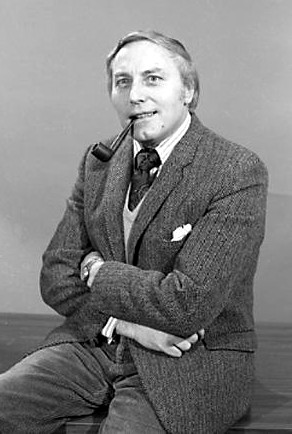
- Dr. Hans H. Indorf, circa 1973
- Born: Germany
- Died: March 10, 1989; Fairfax, Virginia
- Occupation(s): Resident Director Haus Steineck, Bonn, Germany, 1971-1973

Hans H. Indorf (died March 10, 1989, in Fairfax, Virginia) was an academic professor and international advisor in political science. "I regard Dr. Indorf as one of the most brilliant and best informed men on foreign affairs of any expert I have ever come in contact with," said Senator Robert Burren Morgan.

== Early life ==
Hans Indorf, a naturalized American citizen, was born in Germany but escaped to America during the days of Adolf Hitler, and became a Fulbright scholar as part of the Fulbright Program. His parents remained behind in Germany, later East Germany, behind the Iron Curtain.

== Professional life ==
From 1950 through 1952, he was the executive director of the International Youth Community Services in Hanover, Germany. Later, he became the education director on board the ship for the Council on International Educational Exchange of New York. In 1960 through 1965, he worked as a consultant in Pakistan and representative in Malaysia of the Ford Foundation. From 1971 through 1973, he was the resident director of the Haus Steineck of East Carolina University in Bonn-Bad Godesberg, Germany. In 1974 and 1975 he was a lecturer for the USIS in Southeast Asia and visiting professor at the University of Malaya in Kuala Lumpur.

"Dr. Hans H. Indorf, Associate Professor of Political Science at East Carolina University, has been selected for a Fulbright-Hayes award by the Board of Foreign Scholarships and the US Department of State. The award is for consultation in Malaysia on the development of the new division of Southeast Asian Studies at the University of Malaya in Kuala Lumpur. Dr. Indorf will also teach a course on regionalism at the university. Dr. Indorf's specialties are international education, comparative government and Asian politics."

"Hans. H. Indorf, East Carolina University, received his second Fulbright-Hays Award. Since May (1977) he served as a Visiting Professor at the University of Malaysia and in October he joined the Washington, D.C., staff of US Senator Robert Morgan (North Carolina) as an advisor on foreign and domestic policies."

"Indorf had resided for many years in Fairfax where he operated an international consulting firm, lectured and wrote. He first moved to the DC area during his service as legislative affairs director for former US Senator Robert Morgan (D-NC). Indorf completed a term as distinguished visiting professor at Virginia Military Institute last year."

== Foreign residences and studies ==
Indorf spent a great deal of his life overseas. He worked and studied in Egypt (1945–1947); Great Britain (1947–1950); Scandinavia (1952, 1970, 1971, 1973, 1974, 1976); Western Europe (1953-1955 1968, 1969, 1970. 1971-1973, 1974, 1975 and 1976); India, Burma and East Asia (1962, 1964 and 1965); Malaysia (1962–1965, 1974 and 1975); Southeast Asia (1962. 1964, 1974 and 1975); Afghanistan, Vietnam and Taiwan (1964); USSR (1964, 1971); Hungary (1973); East Africa (1965) and Ceylon-Sri Lanka (1975).

== Academic degrees and studies ==
- New York University, New York; PhD in political science
- Columbia University, New York; MA in public law and government
- Goethe University, Frankfurt, Germany; graduate study in political economy
- Hochschule fuer Arbeit and Wirtschaft, Wilhelmshaven, Germany; diploma of studies
- Boston University, School of Social Work, Boston, Massachusetts; graduate study in community relations
- St. Pierre College, Chepstow, Monmouthshire, Great Britain; diploma in social science
- Wilton Park, Beaconsfield, Bucks, Great Britain (Ministry of Defense School of Languages); study in political science

== Awards and honors ==
- Fulbright Award, 1952
- Ford Foundation Travel and Study Award, 1960
- New York University's Founder's Day Certificate, 1969
- Fulbright Award, 1975
- International Who's Who in Asia Studies, 1976
- Belgian Government Inaugural Lecturer, University of Liège, 1976

== Publications ==
- Indorf, Hans H. 2000. "Some Speculations on a Second Blueprint for ASEAN". Contemporary Southeast Asia. 3, no. 2: 140-159.
- Indorf, Hans H. 2000. "The U.S.‑ASEAN Dialogue: A Search for Procedural Improvements". Contemporary Southeast Asia. 8, no. 3: 179-191.
- Indorf, Hans H., and Patrick M. Mayerchak. Linkage or Bondage: U.S. Economic Relations with the ASEAN Region. New York: Greenwood Press, 1989.
- Indorf, Hans H., Wilfredo G. Reyes, and Abel C. Icatlo. The Spratlys A Test Case for the US Bases in the Philippines. [Manila, Philippines]: Institute for International and Strategic Studies, 1989. <http://catalog.hathitrust.org/api/volumes/oclc/34491884.html>.
- Indorf, Hans H. 1988. "The 1988 Philippine Base Review". Asian Affairs: An American Review. 15, no. 1: 21-34.
- Indorf, Hans H., and Earnest W. Porta. The Association of Southeast Asian Nations: After 20 Years. Washington, D.C.: Asia Program, Woodrow Wilson International Center for Scholars, 1988.
- Indorf, Hans H. 1987. "ASEAN in Extra‑Regional Perspective". Contemporary Southeast Asia. 9, no. 2: 86-105.
- Indorf, Hans H. Strategies for Small-State Survival. Kuala Lumpur, Malaysia: Institute of Strategic and International Studies, 1985. ISBN 9679997405.
- Indorf, Hans H. Impediments to regionalism in Southeast Asia bilateral constraints among ASEAN member states. Singapore: Institute of Southeast Asian Studies, 1984.
- Indorf, Hans H. 1984. "Critical Undercurrents in Future U.S.-ASEAN Relations". Indonesian Quarterly. -. 124: 440-460.
- Indorf, Hans H. 1983. "Political Dimensions of Interregional Cooperation: The Case of ASEAN and the EEC". The Round Table. 72, no. 286: 119-136.
- Indorf, Hans H. 1983. "Political Dimensions of Inter-Regional Cooperation: ASEAN and the EEC". Asia Pacific Community. -. no. 19: 89-107.
- Indorf, Hans H. "Stage Set for Thai Army Reshuffle." The Straits Timjes. September 12, 1983, page 19.
- Kim Khanh, Huynh, and Hans H. Indorf. 1982. "Southeast Asia 1981: Two Currents Running". Southeast Asian Affairs. 1982, no. 1: 3-25.
- Indorf, Hans H. Thai-American Relations in Contemporary Affairs. Singapore: Executive Publications, 1982. "The American Studies Program of Chulalongkorn University ... took the initiative to produce this anniversary volume". ISBN 9971833018.
- Indorf, Hans H., and Astri Suhrke. 1981. "Indochina: The Nemesis Of Asean?" Southeast Asian Affairs 1981. 1981, no. 1: 62-72.
- Pacific Symposium (National Defense University), Robert A. Brand, Patricia K. Hymson, and Hans H. Indorf. Lines of Communication and Security: National Defense University Proceedings of the Second Pacific Symposium, 1981. Washington, D.C.: The University, 1981.
- Indorf, Hans H. 1980. "Malaysia 1979: A Preoccupation with Security". Asian Survey. 20, no. 2: 135-143.
- Indorf, Hans H. 1979. "Malaysia 1978: Communal Coalitions Continue". Asian Survey. 19, no. 2: 115-123.
- Indorf, Hans H. 1978. "The Kuala Lumpur Summit: A Second for ASEAN". Southeast Asian Affairs 1978. 1978, no. 1: 35-44.
- Indorf, Hans H. 1978. "Malaysia in 1977: A Prelude to Premature Parliamentary Elections". Asian Survey. 18, no. 2: 186-193.
- Indorf, Hans H. The Association of Southeast Asian Nations: An Inventory of Aspirations and Achievement. 1975. 'Prepared for delivery at the 14th Annual Meeting of the Southeast Region Conference - Association for Asian Studies, University of Georgia, Athens, Georgia, January 23–25, 1975'.
- Indorf, Hans H. ASEAN, Problems and Prospects. Singapore: Institute of Southeast Asian Studies, 1975.
- Indorf, Hans H. "The Fulbright-Hayes Exchange Program in Malaysia: A Structural Review." USIS; US Deparmtnet of State. 22 pages. 1975.
- Indorf, Hans H. "Indian Ocean Policies in Light of Soviet-American Detante." Journal Hubungan Antarabangsa (Malaysia). 1974.
- Indorf, Hans H. Party System Adaptation to Political Development in Malaysia During the First Decade of Independence: 1957-1967. Thesis (Ph. D.)--New York University, Graduate School of Arts and Science, 1969, 1969.
- Indorf, Hans H. "Avenues for International Education Exchange in Asia." Institute for International Education. 112 pages. 1962.
- Indorf, Hans H. "American Universities as a Development Component in Pakistan. Ford Foundation Paper. 48 pages. 1961.
- Indorf, Hans H. The Development of the Concept of International Responsibility Toward Colonial Areas. 1957. Masters essay. Columbia University. Public Law and Government.
