= List of high commissioners of Malaysia to Brunei =

Malaysia High Commissioner to Brunei
- Coat of Arms of Malaysia
- Incumbent; Mohd Aini Antan since 19 September 2024
- Style: His Excellency
- Seat: Bandar Seri Begawan
- Appointer: Yang di-Pertuan Agong
- Inaugural holder: Zainal Abidin Ibrahim
- Formation: 1982
- Website: www.kln.gov.my/web/brn_bandar-seri-begawan/home

The high commissioner of Malaysia to the Nation of Brunei, the Abode of Peace is the head of Malaysia's diplomatic mission to Brunei. The position has the rank and status of an ambassador extraordinary and plenipotentiary and is based in the High Commission of Malaysia, Bandar Seri Begawan.

== List of heads of mission ==
=== High commissioners to Brunei ===
No.	High Commissioner	Term start	Term end	Ref
1	Zainal Abidin Ibrahim	1982	1986	
2	Syed Hussin Syed Abu Bakar	1986	1987	
3	Zainal Abidin Mokhtar	1987	1989	
4	Zainal Abidin Azman	1990	1991	
5	Mustaffa Mohammad	1991	1993	
6	Salim Hashim	1994	1997	
7	Wan Yusof Wan Embong	1997	2001	
8	Salman Ahmad	23 June 2001	12 May 2003	
9	Mohd Jamil Johari	20 June 2003	3 August 2004	
10	Ali Abdullah	28 March 2005	2 August 2007	
11	Ku Jaafar Ku Shaari	8 August 2007	23 September 2010	
12	Abdullah Sani Omar	8 March 2011	24 March 2013	
13	Awang Sahak Awang Salleh	1 October 2013	30 September 2015	
14	Ghulam Jelani Khanizaman	8 February 2016	30 June 2018	
15	Ismail Haji Salam	10 February 2019	18 December 2019	
16	Raja Reza Zaib Shah	22 November 2021	18 May 2024	
17	Datuk Mohd Aini Atan	19 September 2024	Incumbent	

== See also ==
- Brunei–Malaysia relations
