= Ghulam-Sarwar Yousof =

Malaysian writer and academic (1939–2022)

- ਗੁਲਾਮ-ਸਰਵਰ ਯੁਸੂਫ
- Born: 21 November 1939; Penang, Straits Settlements
- Died: 10 November 2022 (aged 82)
- Education: Department of Drama and Theatre
- Alma mater: University of Hawaiʻi
- Occupation: Writer
- Writing career
- Language: English
- Notable awards: – International Award for Outstanding Contribution for Humanity, Peace, Culture and Education (Forum for Culture and Human Development, Bangladesh) (2001): Dove Award for Excellence in Poetry awarded (Poetry Day Australia), (2001)

Ghulam-Sarwar Yousof (Punjabi: ਗੁਲਾਮ-ਸਰਵਰ ਯੁਸੂਫ, romanized: Gulāma-saravara yusūpha; 21 November 1939 – 10 November 2022) was a Malaysian academic and writer.

He published three collections of verse: Performed Memories (1982), Songs for Shooting Stars: Mystical Verse (2011) and Transient Moments (2012).

One book said "Ghulam Sarwar’s contemporary poetry and Wordsworth’s poems from the Romantic era have a very similar and strong affinity with nature."

== Death ==
Yousof died on 10 November 2022, at the age of 82.
