= Zurinah Hassan =

Malaysian national laureate (born 1949)

Zurinah Hassan (born 13 June 1949) is a Malaysian national laureate. She is the first female writer to be conferred the title National Laureate which in Malaysia is officially known as Sasterawan Negara.

== Biography ==
Zurinah Hassan was born in Alor Setar, Kedah. She undertook her secondary education at Sultanah Asma School. She studied at the Universiti Sains Malaysia for the first degree. After working for fifteen years, she took an early retirement to devote her time writing. Besides writing she also pursued a master's degree at Universiti Putra Malaysia and later a PhD degree at University of Malaya. In 1974, Hassan authored Sesayup Jalan, and subsequently published poems, short stories and novels, some of which were translated into French, Spanish, and Russian. She won the Putera Poetry Award in 1984. She is best known for works such as Facing the Harbour, Memorizing Zurinah Hassan: Tracking Poetry, Decisions, Dawai Dawai and From Mount Jerai to Pekan Rabu.

== Awards and honours ==
In 2013, she became the first Malaysian Sunthorn Phu Poet Laureate when she won the ASEAN Poetry Award. In 2015 she was the first female writer to be awarded the National Literary Award of Malaysia during the 13th National Literary Awards, given by the Ministry of Education. She received RM60,000 in cash and a sponsorship of RM500,000 to publish 50,000 copies of her works to distribute to libraries, schools and agencies.
