= Thopputhurai =

- Town
- Location in Tamil Nadu, India Thopputhurai (India)
- Coordinates: 10°24′00″N 79°50′55″E
- Country: India
- State: Tamil Nadu
- District: Nagapattinam
- Time zone: UTC+5:30 (IST)
- PIN: 614809
- Vehicle registration: TN 51
- Nearest city: Nagapattinam
- Lok Sabha constituency: Nagapattinam
- Climate: Tropical wet and dry (Köppen)
- Website: www.thopputhurai.com

Thopputhurai, formerly known as Sethumadavapuram, is a town on the south eastern coast of Nagapattinam District, Tamil Nadu, India.

== Location ==
Thopputhurai is near the east coast road of Vedaranyam-Nagapattinam, with a radius of approximately 23 km. A majority of people living in Thopputhurai are Muslims and Hindu.

== Origin ==
The name implies that the village has many plantations and harbors. From this village a salt lake mixes with others after running a distance of 4 km. In the early days of the village people used to trade using catamarans to board their goods in to steamers which trade with Malaysia, Singapore, Sri Lanka and other South East Asian countries. The people started calling them 'Marakalayar' and now they are called as 'Maraikayar'. They started trading by way of a barter system. The people take the goods in night by horseback and traded them in the markets in the daytime. These people are called 'Tatharkal', as the days passed they are now called as 'Iravuthur'. This name doesn't relate to a religion they are called so because of their trade. They are no longer called by that name now. Only few are now doing business, some have become agriculturists and the majority of the people are working in foreign countries.
