= Salma Ismail =

Malaysian medical doctor

Tan Sri Salma binti Ismail (19 December 1918 – 20 July 2014) was a Malaysian medical doctor and the first Malaysian Malay woman to qualify as a doctor. She became one of the first Malay general practitioners to open a private practice in 1967.

== Biography ==
Salma Ismail was born on 19 December 1918 in Alor Setar, Kedah. She attended Kampung Baru Girls' School, Kolej Sultan Abdul Hamid, and Sultanah Asma Secondary School, where one of the houses now bears her name. She completed the Junior Cambridge examinations in 1933 and Senior Cambridge in 1935, she was the first girl from Kedah to pass the Senior Cambridge with a distinction. She began her medical studies at the King Edward VII College of Medicine in Singapore in 1936. Classes at the college were suspended during World War II, and so Salma returned to Malaysia in 1941 to work as a trainee doctor at Alor Setar General Hospital. She resumed her studies in 1946 and graduated with a Licentiate in Medicine and Surgery in 1947. After eleven years of training, she became the first accredited Malaysian Malay female doctor.

After her graduation, Salma became a medical officer at Alor Setar General Hospital, where she remained the only woman in that position until 1960. In 1956, she travelled to Dublin, Ireland, to attend a course on obstetrics for postgraduates. It was there that she met her husband, Abu Bakar Ibrahim, also a doctor from Alor Setar. Salma returned from Dublin to Alor Setar, where she was appointed Royal Midwife to Sultanah Bahiyah. She left Alor Setar for Kuala Lumpur in 1960 and served as the medical officer in charge of Tanglin Hospital until 1967, when she opened a private practice. Her practice, Klinik Salma, was one of the first private practices set up by a Malay general practitioner. Klinik Salma later expanded to three branches located around Kuala Lumpur, and Salma retired in 2005.

Salma received the Bintang Cemerlang Kedah and Dato Paduka Mahkota Kedah awards in 1957 and 1996 respectively. She was awarded the Panglima Setia Mahkota in 1997, granting her the Tan Sri title. She died in Kuala Lumpur on 20 July 2014 at the age of 95.

== Honour ==
=== Honour of Malaysia ===
- Malaysia
  - Commander of the Order of Loyalty to the Crown of Malaysia (P.S.M.) (1997)
