= Dol Ramli =

Malaysian businessman

Tan Sri Dol Ramli (1922 - 2011, 88 years old) was a Malaysian who is a former Director General of Broadcasting at Radio Malaya and also the founder of Radio Televisyen Malaysia (RTM).

== Background ==
Dol Ramli was born on October 3, 1922, on Dunlop Street, Singapore. He married Che Kamila Marzuki and had five sons.

He attended the University of Malaya, where he studied history.

At the end of his life in 2011 he had 11 grandchildren and two great -grandchildren.

== Career ==
Tan Sri Dol began his career as a newspaper journalist in Malaysia at Radio Malaya 1948–1954, becoming Director in 1955 and serving in the position until 1975.

He was the General Manager of the state-run Bernama news agency from 1975 to 1980.

From there he became Director-General of Radio Malaya.

Dol Ramli was the lyricist of the song Bahasa Jiwa Bangsa.

== Books ==
- The Uses of Mass Communication Media for Promoting Economic and Political Development (1967)
- Peranan sebaran 'am dalam usaha mengujudkan dan memupuk keperibadian kebangsaan Malaysia tumpuan (1971)
- Masaalah implementasi rumusan kongres kebudayaan mengenai muzik (1974)
- Penggunaan Tradisi Lisan Khasnya Yang Bermusik Untuk TV Dan Radio Dalam Konteks Pembangunan Negara (1975)
- Country Report on Malaysia (1978)
- History of the Malay Regiment, 1933-1942 (1978)
- Regional Cooperation (1979)
- Pengalaman dan peranan penyiaran dalam mengisi dan menghayati kemerdekaan Malaysia (2000)
