= Nurmazilah Mahzan =

Nurmazilah Binti Dato Mahzan (born 28 September 1970) is the former Chief Executive Officer of the Malaysian Institute of Accountants (MIA). The Malaysian Institute of Accountants is the regulatory body for the accountancy profession in Malaysia established under the Accountants Act 1967. Prior to her appointment, she served as its Deputy Chief Executive Officer and a Council Member. She is also a Member of the Malaysian Accounting Standards Board, a member of the Board of Governors for the Institute of Internal Auditors Malaysia, a Council Member of the Malaysian Institute of Certified Public Accountants and Honorary Treasurer of the Malaysian Economic Association.

== Early career ==
Nurmazilah graduated with a bachelor's degree in accountancy from the International Islamic University of Malaysia. She began her career as an audit assistant with Arthur Andersen and proceeded to completing her Certified Public Accountant Certificate with the Malaysian Association of Certified Professional Accountants. She then moved to work in corporate accounting in a Malaysian Public Listed Company and was involved in its listing. She then furthered her education with a Master's of Business Administration and Certified Internal Auditor Examination, she then proceeded to completing her Doctorate at the University of Birmingham in the field of Internal Auditing. She returned to Malaysia to serve as the Deputy Dean of the Faculty of Business and Accountancy and later as the Director of Graduate Business School at the University of Malaya for 16 years before moving to MIA. Nurmazilah holds the title of a Certified Internal Auditor (CIA), a CGMA Fellow and Certified Risk Management and Assurance qualification.

== Accounting profession ==
Since her appointment, Nurmazilah has advocated for the digital transformation of the accounting professional specifically in the adoption of technology, integrated reporting, branding and operational excellence. Her work with the Malaysian Institute of Accountants in digital transformation includes eConfirm.my, an industry-wide electronic bank confirmation platform; an e-library; assistance in connecting accountants to government funding schemes such as the Smart Automation Grant (SAG) under the Ministry of International Trade and Industry for manufacturing companies as well as Malaysia Digital Economy Corporation’s SAG for non-manufacturing companies including professional services.

== Academia ==
In her capacity as the CEO, Nurmazilah also advocates for digital transformation in the field of academia. Her research also includes corporate governance and internal auditing in the accountancy field. Notable work in academia include : "Adoption of Computer Assisted Audit Tools and Techniques (CAATs) By Internal Auditors", "Disclosure Quality On Governance Issues In Annual Reports of Malaysian PLCs", " The Responses of Malaysia Public Listed Companies In Response to the IFRS Convergence" and "Internal Audit of Quality in 5s Environment: Perception on Critical Factors, Effectiveness and Impact on Organizational Performance."

== Awards ==
Nurmazilah was awarded the National Heroine Leadership Award in 2018. The ceremony was held in Kuala Lumpur, and was officiated by Sultan Nazrin Shah the Sultan of Perak and attended by Tun Siti Hasmah and Datuk Seri Wan Azizah. Other awardees include Tan Sri Jemilah Mahmood, Datuk Muhaya Mohamad, Hamidah Naziadin, Datuk Zahrah Abdul Wahab Fenner, Datuk Farshila Emran, Norzilah Mohammed, Tan Sri Robaayah Zambahari and Datuk Mazlan Othman.
