= K. Mohd Ariff =

Malaysian politician

Dr. Sir Kamil Mohamad Ariff bin Kadir Mastan
- Born: July 9, 1893
- Died: 1960 (aged 66–67)
- Education: Licentiate in Medicine and Surgery (LMS), King Edward VII College of Medicine, 1917
- Occupations: Medical Doctor, Member of the Federal Legislative Council
- Known for: Founding The New Dispensary, leadership in medical and community services
- Awards: Commander of the Order of the British Empire (CBE, 1950), Knighted (1956)

Dr Sir Kamil Mohamad Ariff bin Kadir Mastan (1893-1960) was a medical doctor and member of the Federal Legislative Council in Malaysia.

== Early life and education ==
Kamil Mohamad Ariff was born in Butterworth, Province Wellesley, Penang on 9 July 1893. He excelled at St Xavier’s Institution in Penang and completed his Senior Cambridge. He attended the King Edward VII College of Medicine in Singapore and graduated with a Licentiate in Medicine and Surgery (LMS) in 1917. He pursued Housemanship at Penang General Hospital in 1917-18.

== Career ==
He entered private practice in 1918 and operated a clinic named The New Dispensary in Hutton Lane, Penang before it was relocated to Penang Road and then to Beach Street, where he remained in medical practice all his life (1918–60).

He was the Assistant Surgeon (AS) to District and General Hospitals in Penang in the Straits Settlement (SS) 1918-41 and worked entirely in Penang (before, during WWII 1941-45 and after the war). He attended meetings with the British Administration during the British Reoccupation in 1945. He retired from the Government medical service in 1948.

== Career impact ==
He contributed greatly to society and headed the Malay community in Penang. He was the Chairman of the Penang Consultative Committee on Muslim Affairs, Chairman of the Penang Muslim Orphanage, Founding Secretary of the Penang Medical Practitioners' Society (PMPS) in 1932, appointed member and retired member of the Federal Legislative Council 1946-56. He was a Member of the Finance Committee, Executive Council (Exco) member of Penang State Legislative Council and City Council, President of Penang Rotary Club(1933-1934), and a member of the British Medical Association (BMA). He was a member of the Mohammedan Advisory Board in Penang. He was a member of the Penang Peranakan Club and a member of the Old Xavierian's Association (OXA).

== Honors ==
He was appointed the Commander of the Order of the British Empire (CBE) by King George VI in 1950. Subsequently, he was knighted by Queen Elizabeth II in 1956 (Letters Patent) following which he became known as Sir Kamil Mohamed Ariff. He was the first Malay doctor to be knighted in the history of Penang, the Straits Settlement and Malaya (now Malaysia). A road in Georgetown Penang, Lengkok Ariff (Ariff Crescent) was named after him in tribute to his contributions to Penang.
