= Phang Siew Moi =

Botanist

Phang Siew Moi is a full professor at the Department of Biotechnology, Faculty of Applied Science, UCSI University. She is a leading expert in algal biotechnology and utilization, particularly converting algae into biodiesel.

== Career ==
Dr. Phang Siew Moi, FASc is a distinguished professor and Deputy Vice-Chancellor (Research and Postgraduate) at UCSI University. She was formerly a full professor at the Institute of Biological Sciences, Faculty of Science, University of Malaya. She was also the founding director of Institute of Ocean & Earth Science; currently, Dr. Phang is an Honorary Advisor and professor emerita.

She has been featured in a special edition of the Stay Hungry, Stay Foolish documentary series on Astro AEC.

== Awards and honors ==
Dr. Phang won the Newton Prize in 2017 for her work on developing an integrated microbial fuel cell prototype using tropical algae from wastewater. She was also on Stanford University’s World’s Top 2% of Scientists for her work in 2021.

== Selected publications ==
Phang Siew Moi has published papers in phycology, algae biotechnology, and seaweed biotechnology. Examples include:

- Ambati, R. R., Phang, S. M., Ravi, S., & Aswathanarayana, R. G. (2014). Astaxanthin: Sources, extraction, stability, biological activities and its commercial applications—A review. Marine drugs, 12(1), 128-152.
- Chia, S. R., Ong, H. C., Chew, K. W., Show, P. L., Phang, S. M., Ling, T. C., ... & Chang, J. S. (2018). Sustainable approaches for algae utilisation in bioenergy production. Renewable energy, 129, 838-852.
- Lim, S. L., Chu, W. L., & Phang, S. M. (2010). Use of Chlorella vulgaris for bioremediation of textile wastewater. Bioresource technology, 101(19), 7314-7322.
