= Megat Burhainuddin =

Malaysian academic administrator (died 2023)

Yang Berbahagia Prof. Datuk Dr. Megat Burhainuddin bin Megat Abdul Rahman PJN DPMP JSM KMN
- Born: Perak
- Died: 13 February 2023; Hospital Ampang
- Citizenship: Malaysian
- Known for: Vice Chancellor of Nilai University

Megat Burhainuddin bin Megat Abdul Rahman was an ex Vice-Chancellor and Chief Executive Officer of Nilai University, as well as the Deputy Chairman of the St. John Council of Malaysia and Deputy Commander-in-Chief of St. John Ambulance of Malaysia.

== Career ==
After graduating from the Faculty of Medicine, University of Malaya, Megat Burhainuddin has undergone specialty training in Public Health Medicine and served in the Government of Malaysia for 30 years as Public Health Medicine Specialist with special interest in Health Services Management Health Planning and Health Manpower Planning. Following this he attended other courses in several universities, including Health Planning in University of Toronto, Canada; Health Economics in London School of Hygiene & Tropical Medicine, University of London, Management Training in Central Officer Training Institute in Seoul, Korea, and Advanced Management in Harvard Business School, Harvard University, United States.

In the area of training he held the position of Director of the Institute of Public Health and Director of Training and Manpower Planning at the Ministry of Health. In Health Services Management he was appointed the Director of Kuala Lumpur Hospital during which he was responsible for smooth running and efficient management of the premier hospital and the National Referral Centre of the country's medical care system. Following this, he was responsible for planning for the Health Services of the country as Director of Planning and Development. The last appointment held in the Ministry of Health was the Deputy Director General of Health where he was given responsibility of coordinating the development of Medical Care Services.

After his retirement from the civil service and prior to his appointment at MAHSA University College, he was the Principal and Chief Executive Officer of Melaka-Manipal Medical College, an educational institution twinned with Manipal Academy of Higher Education, an established deemed University in India.

Megat Burhainuddin also has presented papers at both local and international level on varying topics in relation to Health Policy Formulation and Development; in particular, Health Economics and Financing; Health Technology Development and Health Manpower Development. He was appointed short-term consultant by international organizations, including W.H.O., in the field of Health Services Management, Health Planning and Human Resources Development including Training; and, I.D.R.C., Canada, in the field of Health Systems Research.

== Appointments ==
Megat Burhainuddin was a council member of the Malaysian Medical Council. As a council member, he has presided over a number of Preliminary Investigation Committees, including the probe into the possible misconduct on the post-mortem conducted on A. Kugan, a detainee who died in 2009 whilst in police custody.

He was also a Fellow of the Academy of Medicine Malaysia.

== Awards and honours ==
- Panglima Jasa Negara (P.J.N., which carries the title Datuk) - 1999
- Darjah Dato' Paduka Mahkota Perak (DPMP, which carries the title Dato') - 1990
- Johan Setia Mahkota (J.S.M.) - 1991
- Kesatria Mangku Negara (K.M.N.) - 1987
- Commander (Brother) of the Order of St John (CStJ) - 1991
- Serving Brother of the Order of St John (SBStJ) - 1987
