= President College =

College in Kuala Lumpur, Malaysia

- Motto: "Fast Forward Your Dream"
- Type: Private
- Established: 2007
- Location: Kuala Lumpur, Malaysia
- Website: www.president.edu.my

President College is a private educational institution located in the center of Kuala Lumpur, Malaysia. It was established in year 2007 as an academy.

President College currently have 3 campuses. One of them at Titiwangsa, one more at Sultan Ismail Street and the third one in Penang, Weld Quay.

President College offers education programmes at the Pre-U and Diploma levels. It has a student population of over 2,500, where an estimated 25% are international students from over 10 countries.

In the current MyQuest rating of private institutions by the Education Ministry, it was awarded both a five-star rating for the overall category and the highest six-star rating for international readiness.

== Accreditation ==
The following programmes have been fully accredited by the Malaysian Qualifications Agency (MQA).

Pre-University:

- Foundation in Science
- Foundation in Business & Arts
- Canadian Pre University

Diploma:

- Diploma in Business
- Diploma in Accounting
- Diploma in Security Management
- Diploma in Real Estate Management
- Diploma in Law Enforcement

== Campuses ==
President College is made up of three campuses located in Kuala Lumpur and Penang.

The Kuala Lumpur Campuses The Kuala Lumpur @KL campuses are located at Jalan Tun Razak (Titiwangsa) and Jalan Raja Laut (Sultan Ismail) within the heart of the city. It is nestled in between several icons of the city including the Putra World Trade Centre and the Titiwangsa Lake. It is also well connected via the city's main public transport systems such as the Monorail and light rail transit [LRT]. The campuses allow for the best in the city in terms of transportation, food, arts and culture and sports to be conveniently accessed by students.

The Penang Campus The Penang @PG campus is located within the UNESCO World Heritage Sites Weld Quay area. It lies in the heart of Georgetown on Penang Island. It is served via a main artery of bus lines as well as being a stone throw distance away from Church Pier which connects the island to the mainland via ferry services.

== Education pathway ==
President College offers various types of pre-university, and diploma courses. However, it is acknowledged as the biggest independent centre for Foundation in Science and Canadian Pre University. Programmes are merely recognised and acknowledged by worldwide, which allow students to have more Universities choices included in the Europe countries.

Students can choose to major in subjects including Medicine (not available), Dentistry (not available), Pharmacy (not available), Veterinary Science (not available), Accounting, Business, Hospitality (not available) and Tourism (not available), Law Enforcement, Real Estate Management and Security Management.

President College will soon be launching new programmes such as:

- Diploma in Logistics Management
- Diploma in Culinary Arts
- Diploma in Creative Arts & Event Management
- Diploma in Advertising
- Diploma in Beauty Management
- Diploma in Hospitality & Tourism
- Degree in Business
- Degree in Law Enforcement

== University Partners ==
List of co-operation programmes with more than 25 Universities around the world (for the purpose of marketing only):

Russia

- Moscow State Medical University
- Russian State Medical University
- Kursk State Medical University

Indonesia

- University Padjadjaran
- University Sumatera Utara
- University Gadjah Mada
- Institute Teknologi Bandung
- University Airlangga
- University Brawijaya
- University Udayana

Poland & Czech

- Charles University, Prague
- Palacky University, Olomouc
- University of Lodz
- University of Warsaw
- Jagiellonian University

Canada

- University of British Columbia
- University of Calgary
- University of Waterloo
- University of Ottawa

India

- Krishna Institute of Medical Sciences
- Vinyaka Missions University
- AB Shetty | Bapuji Dental College
- Meenakshi Ammal Dental College
- Sri Ramachandra Dental College

China

- Jinan University
- Sichuan University
- Sun Yat Sen University
- Wuhan University
