= Tengku Rethwan =

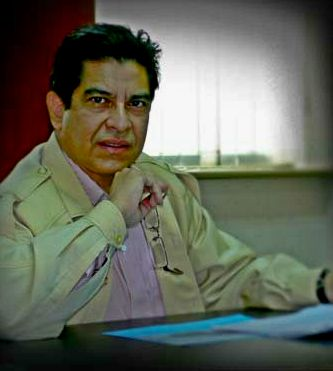
- Born: Tengku Rethwan bin Tengku Mansor; November 4, 1954 (age 71); Kelana Jaya, Selangor, Malaysia

Tengku Rethwan bin Tengku Mansor is a Malaysian businessman who ventured into Selangor state politics. Tengku Rethwan is the chairman of President college. He is one of the Barisan Nasional candidates for GE-13.

== Education ==
Tengku Rethwan started his tertiary education in UiTM and graduated with Diploma in Science in 1975. He then later obtained his MBBS from University Malaya, Bachelor of Law (LLB-London), MBA from University Malaya, and currently he is pursuing his PHD on Social Networking in Entrepreneurship at the University of Amsterdam.

== Knighthood ==
Tengku Rethwan was awarded the Darjah Paduka Tuanku Jaafar [DPTJ], Negeri Sembilan in the year 2000 which carries the title Datuk.

== President College Chairman ==
As the Chairman of President College Kuala Lumpur, Tengku Rethwan believes that education lies in the development of industry driven knowledge, practical skills and character development. He is also the founder of the college.
