= Malaysia–Ukraine relations =

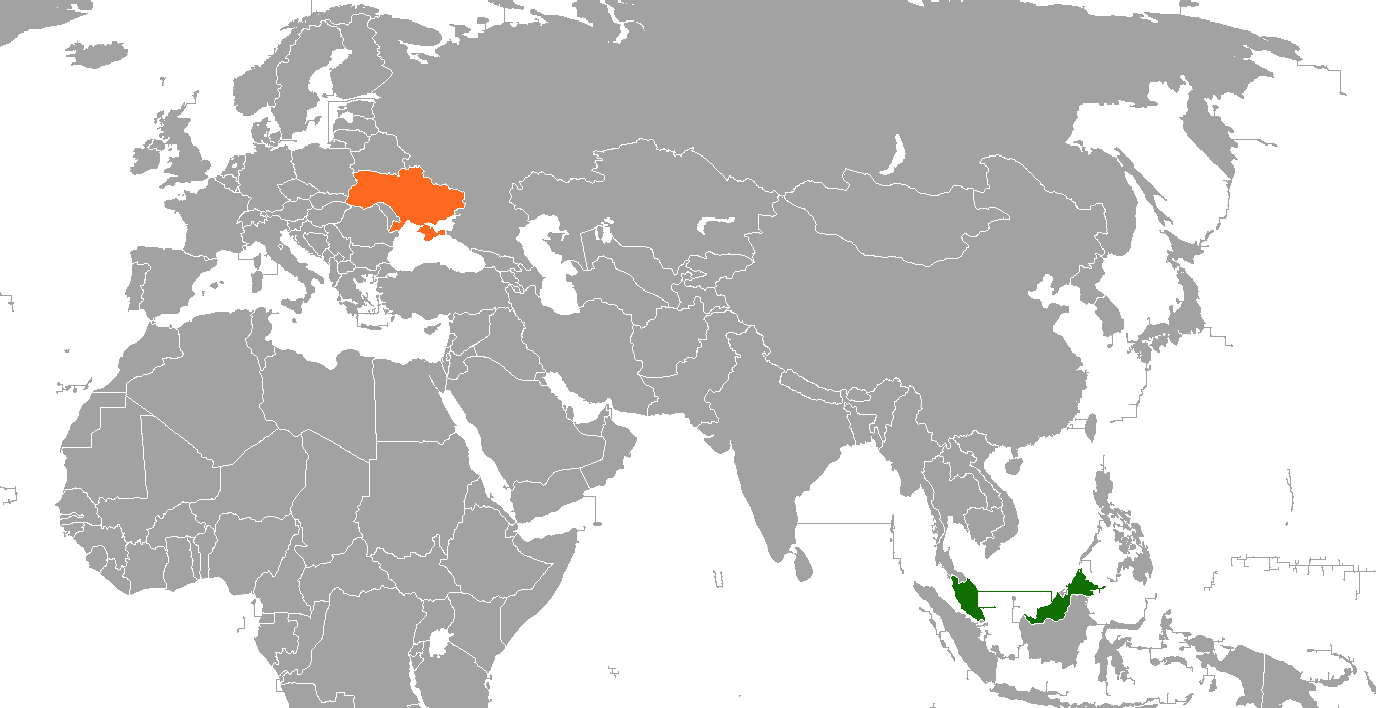

- Malaysia: Ukraine

Diplomatic mission
- Malaysian Embassy, Kyiv: Ukrainian Embassy, Kuala Lumpur

Envoy
- Ambassador: Ambassador

Malaysia–Ukraine relations are the bilateral relations between Malaysia and Ukraine. Malaysia has an embassy in Kyiv, and Ukraine has an embassy in Kuala Lumpur.

== History ==
Diplomatic relations between the two countries were established on 3 March 1992, and Malaysia was among the first countries to recognise the independence of Ukraine. In 2003, Malaysian Prime Minister Mahathir Mohamad paid an official visit to meet the President of Ukraine Leonid Kuchma. Since the visit, the relations between these two countries have focused on economic, scientific, military-technical and humanitarian aspects. Ukraine praised Malaysia on its Islamic affairs administration and expressed interest in learning from Malaysia's experience in that regard.

On 17 July 2014, Malaysia Airlines Flight 17 was shot down over Ukraine.

During the 2022 Russian invasion of Ukraine, Malaysia supported and voted in favor of the 11th Emergency Special Session (ESS) of the United Nations General Assembly, which demanded that Russia immediately end its military operations in Ukraine. In February 2023, Malaysia sent medical aid to Ukraine.

== Education relations ==
Malaysia concluded a Memorandum of Understanding (MoU) with three prominent universities in Ukraine to operate three Offshore Campus Medical Degree Programmes to award local students with the Doctor of Medicine (MD) degree.

== Economic relations ==
In 2012, Ukraine's exports to Malaysia (estimated at U$236.6 million) included chemical and organic fertilisers and sunflower oil. Malaysia's exports to Ukraine (around U$125.7 million) included palm oil, electrical machinery and equipment, video and audio equipment, rubber, boilers, industrial machinery and equipment, furniture, plastics and plastic products, cocoa, soaps and other washing preparations equipment.

Trade has been affected by the Russian invasion of Ukraine. The overall value of trade between Malaysia and Ukraine for the first 11 months of 2023 was US$374.8 million (RM1.76 billion), up 30% from 2022. The combined value of trade between the two nations in 2022 was US$90.68 million, 77.6% less than the US$405 million reported in 2021.

== Diplomatic relations ==
Ambassador of Malaysia to Ukraine
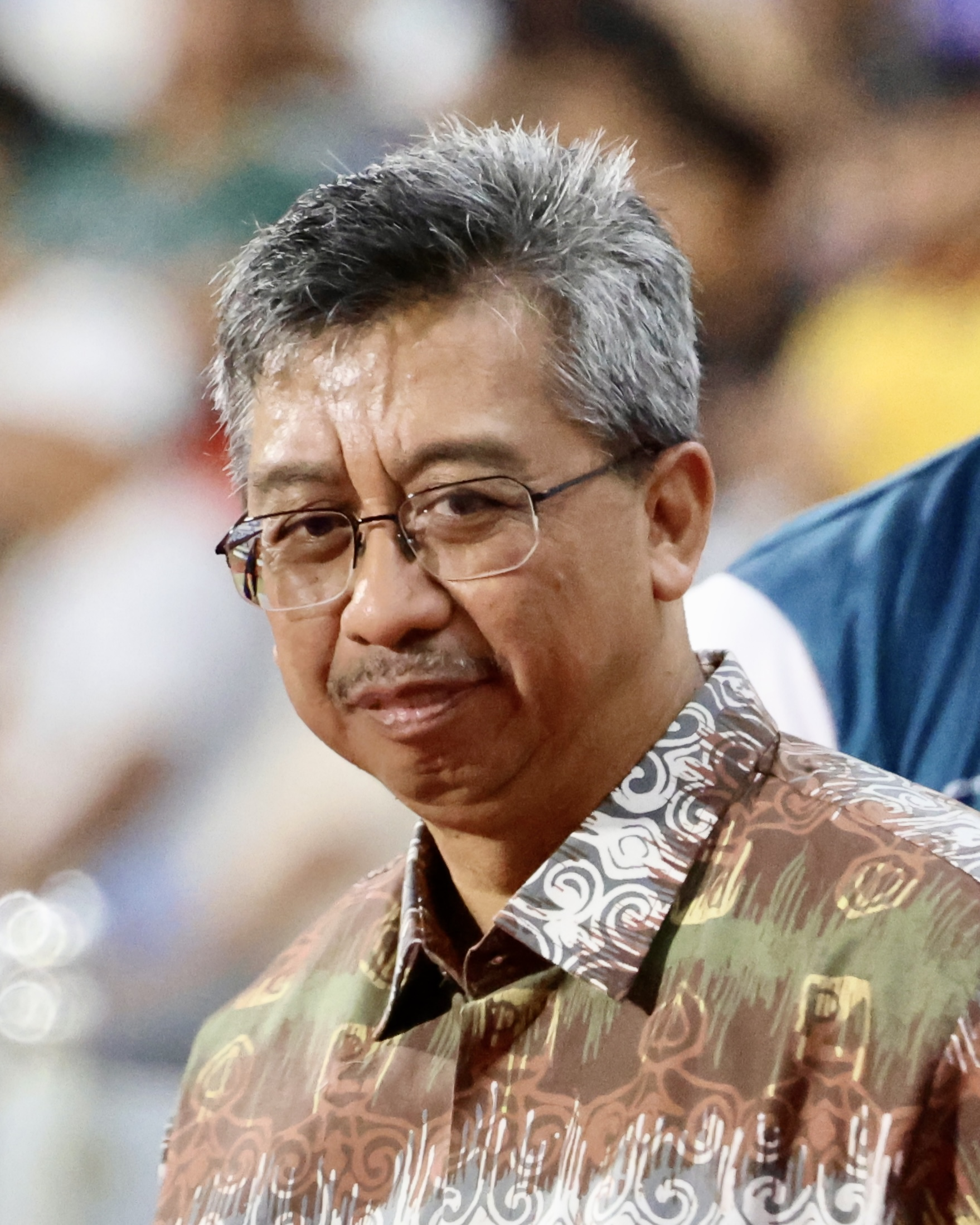
- Incumbent; Raja Reza Zaib Shah since 2018
- Style: His Excellency
- Seat: Kyiv, Ukraine
- Appointer: Yang di-Pertuan Agong
- Inaugural holder: Aminahtun Karim Shaharudin
- Formation: 18 November 2004
- Website: www.kln.gov.my/web/ukr_kiev/home

The ambassador of Malaysia to Ukraine is the head of Malaysia's diplomatic mission to Ukraine. The position has the rank and status of an ambassador extraordinary and plenipotentiary and is based in the Embassy of Malaysia, Kyiv.

=== Ambassadors to Poland and concurrently accredited to Ukraine ===
Ambassador	Term start	Term end
Abd Rahman Abd Rahim	22 February 1995	
Muhammad Noh	8 April 1997	
Ng Bak Hai	24 October 2000	
Mohd Daud Yusoff	30 April 2004	

=== Ambassadors to Ukraine ===
Ambassador	Term start	Term end
Aminahtun Karim Shaharudin	18 November 2004	
Abdullah Sani Omar	30 January 2008	
Chuah Teong Ban	6 April 2011	
Ayauf Bachi	14 June 2016	
Raja Reza Zaib Shah	2018	2021

== See also ==
- Foreign relations of Malaysia
- Foreign relations of Ukraine
