= Raja Reza Zaib Shah =

Malaysian diplomat

Tuan Yang Terutama Dato' Raja Reza Zaib Shah
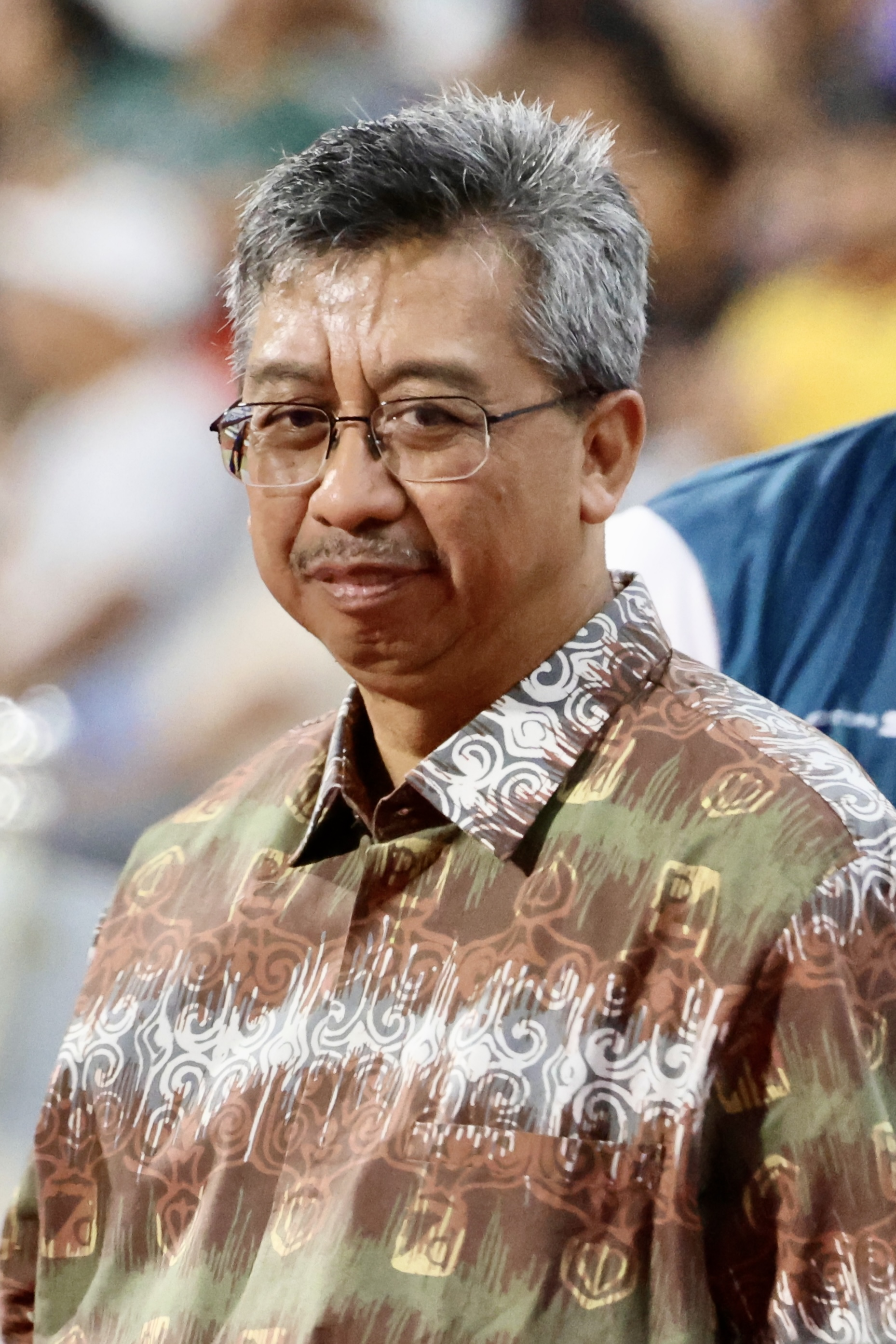
- Raja Reza in 2024

High Commissioner of Malaysia to Brunei
- In office 22 November 2021 – 18 May 2024
- Preceded by: Ismail Salam
- Succeeded by: Datuk Mohd Aini Atan

Ambassador of Malaysia to Ukraine
- In office 21 September 2018 – May 2021
- Preceded by: Ayauf Bachi
- Succeeded by: Vacant

Personal details
- Spouse: Roslina Ismail
- Education: University of Malaya; National Institute of Public Administration
- Occupation: Diplomat; civil servant

Dato' Raja Reza bin Raja Zaib Shah is a Malaysian diplomat who served as high commissioner to Brunei from 2021 to 2024, and ambassador to Ukraine from 2018 to 2021.

== Career ==
Raja Reza was an advisor to the Malaysian Embassy in Jakarta from 2007 until 2011. After this, he served as the Permanent Mission of Malaysia to the United Nations' (UN) chargé d'affaires while also holding the post of Deputy Permanent Representative of Malaysia to the UN in New York from 2013 to 2016. After then, he became the Deputy Minister of Foreign Affairs, leading the Department of West Asia, from 2016 to 2018.

Raja Reza has been acting as the ambassador to Kyiv since September 2018. Notable occasions include delivering copies of credentials to Sergiy Kyslytsya, Ukraine's deputy minister of foreign affairs, on 7 September 2018, and presenting credentials to President Petro Poroshenko on the 21st. He invited the media to attend a dinner function on 18 May 2021. The purpose of the event was to reconnect with the media following their last interactions with the embassy and to provide the ambassador with a means of thanking them for their assistance throughout his three-year stay in Kyiv.

Raja Reza started working at the Malaysian High Commission in Bandar Seri Begawan on 12 August 2021. On 11 October 2021, he gave Sultan Hassanal Bolkiah his letter of credence. He called Halbi Mohd Yussof on 22 November to give him an introduction. On 1 September 2023, he expressed his pride at the 25,000-strong Malaysian population in the Sultanate, which he claimed was contributing to Brunei's growth and well-being. On 15 May 2024, a farewell gathering was held for him by the diplomatic corps.

== Personal life ==
Raja Reza is married to Datin Roslina binti Haji Ismail.

Diplomatic posts
Preceded by Ismail Salam	High Commissioner of Malaysia to Brunei; 22 November 2021 – present	Succeeded by Incumbent
Preceded by Ayauf Bachi	Ambassador of Malaysia to Ukraine; 21 September 2018 – May 2021	Succeeded by Vacant
