= Alireza Yaghoubi =

Iranian businessman

- Born: 1990 (age 35–36); Tehran, Iran
- Education: University of Malaya
- Occupations: Scientist, engineer, entrepreneur, designer

Alireza Yaghoubi (born in Tehran, Iran) is an entrepreneur, engineer, scientist, inventor and designer. He is internationally recognized for designing AirGo, an ergonomic passenger environment which has been described as "the future of airlines seating". Alireza is a recipient of James Dyson design award. He is also the co-founder and CTO of a Singapore-based startup named AirGo Design. In materials science and physical chemistry, he is known for his contribution to the fields of biomedical implants, plasma-assisted inorganic synthesis, and development of nanomaterials for clean energy. In honor of his achievements and despite his young age, he has been appointed to an endowed chair as the high impact research young scientist at University of Malaya from where he has also received a bachelor's degree as the Frederic Barnes Waldron student of mechanical engineering.
