= Nazir Razak =

Malaysian banking executive (born 1966)

Yang Berbahagia Tan Sri Dato' Sri Nazir Razak PSM SSAP SIMP DPMS
- ناظر رازق
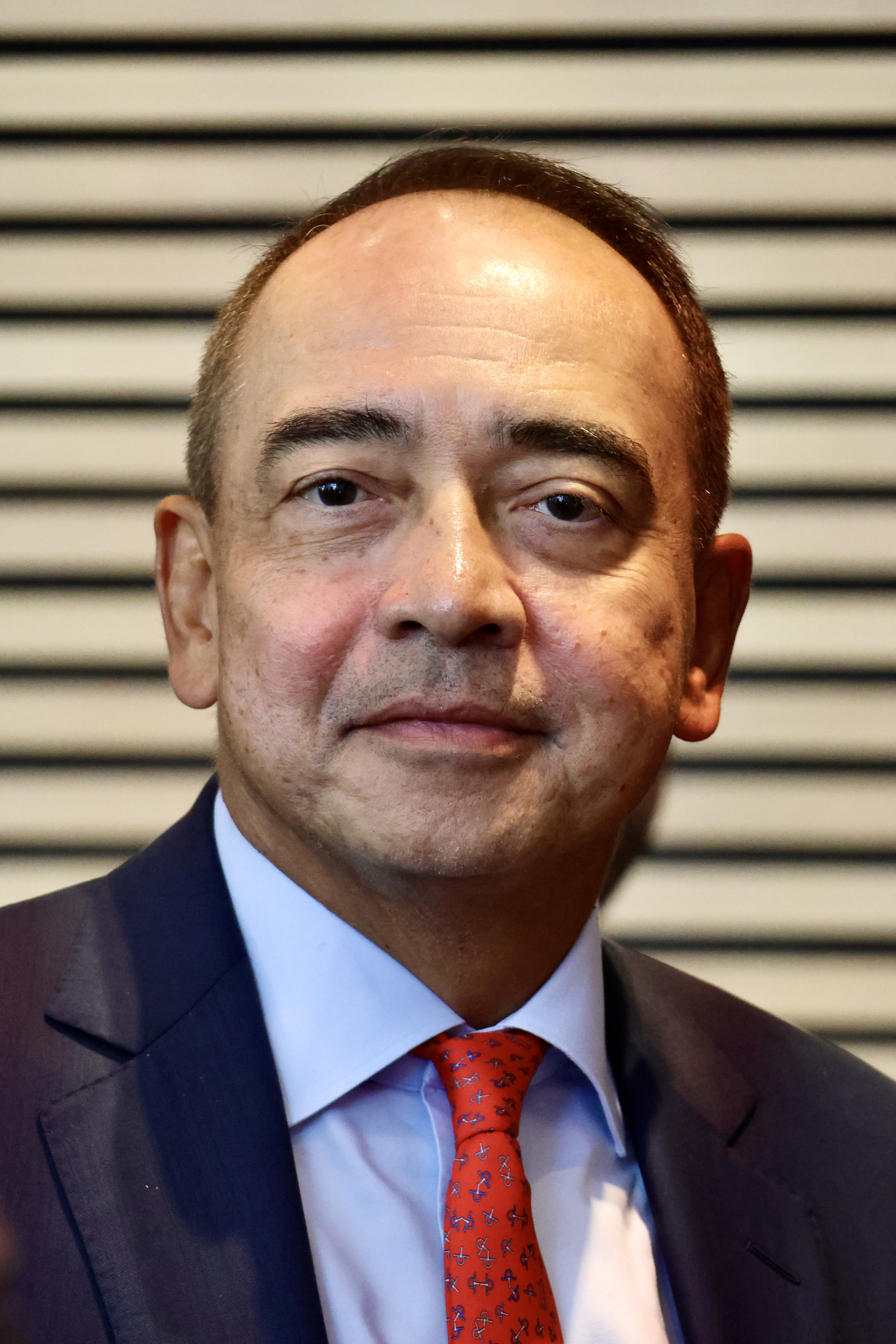
- Nazir in 2025
- Born: Mohamed Nazir bin Abdul Razak; 19 November 1966 (age 59); Kuala Lumpur General Hospital, Kuala Lumpur, Malaysia
- Education: University of Bristol (BSc); University of Cambridge (MPhil)
- Occupation: Banker
- Spouse(s): Azlina Aziz (m. 1992; div. 2023) Yati Zainuddin (m. 2023)
- Children: 2
- Parents: Abdul Razak Hussein (father); Rahah Noah (mother)
- Relatives: Najib Razak (brother); Hussein Onn (uncle); Suhailah Noah (aunt); Mohamed Noah Omar (grandfather); Abdul Aziz Taha (former father-in-law); Nazifuddin Najib (nephew); Onn Hafiz Ghazi (nephew); Nizar Najib (nephew)
- Nazir Razak's voice Nazir speaking about ASEAN; Recorded 20 January 2017
- Website: www.nazirrazak.my

Mohamed Nazir bin Abdul Razak (born 19 November 1966) is a Malaysian banking executive who was CEO of CIMB Group from 1999 to 2014 and chairman from 2014 to 2018. He is the youngest son of Abdul Razak Hussein, Malaysia's Prime Minister from 1970 to 1976, and the brother of Najib Razak, who was Prime Minister from 2009 to 2018.

Nazir was educated in Malaysia and the United Kingdom, attending Oundle School before studying economics at the University of Bristol and completing a Master of Philosophy in Development Economics and Politics at Cambridge. He was involved in student organisations, including MASSA, the Marshall Society, and the Cambridge Union.

Nazir joined CIMB in 1989 and became CEO in 1999 at the age of 32. He was appointed senior vice-president in 1993, deputy CEO in 1996, and CEO in 1999 at the age of 32. During his tenure, he oversaw CIMB's response to the Asian financial crisis, the acquisition of Southern Bank in 2006, and the expansion of operations in Thailand, Indonesia, and Cambodia. The bank was affected by the 2008 global financial crisis but later recovered. Nazir was also involved in reviewing aspects of 1MDB bond transactions. By 2010, CIMB was Malaysia's second-largest Islamic bank. In 2014, he stepped down as CEO to become chairman of CIMB Group and a director of Khazanah Nasional.

His later career included scrutiny over his role in the 1MDB scandal after US$7 million provided by his brother, then Prime Minister Najib, was transferred to his personal account before the 2013 general election and subsequently distributed to ruling-party politicians. Nazir took a leave of absence as CIMB Group chairman in April 2016 while a review examined the transactions. CIMB announced the following month that he had been cleared of wrongdoing, and he resumed his duties. He was appointed chair of the World Economic Forum's ASEAN Regional Business Council in 2016 and served as chairman of Malaysia Development Bank from 2021 to 2023, during which time he introduced the Agenda 2025, Measuring Impact on National Development framework and oversaw plans to consolidate development finance institutions. He also co-founded Ikhlas Capital, a private equity firm focused on ASEAN markets.

== Early life and education ==
Nazir Razak was born on 19 November 1966 at Kuala Lumpur General Hospital, the youngest child of Malaysia's second Prime Minister, Abdul Razak Hussein, and his wife, Rahah Noah. He was born into a political family; his father had served as Pahang state secretary and UMNO deputy president, while his maternal grandfather, Mohamed Noah Omar, was chairman of UMNO in Johor. He spent much of his childhood at Sri Taman, the official residence of his father, and attended St John's Primary School in Bukit Nanas from 1972 to 1976. On 14 January 1976, when Nazir was nine years old, his father died from leukaemia. He subsequently continued his education at the Alice Smith School from 1977 to 1979.

From 1980 to 1985, Nazir attended Oundle School in Northamptonshire. He later studied at the University of Bristol, where he earned a Bachelor of Science with honours. While at Bristol, he played football and rugby and was president of the Malaysia and Singapore Students' Association (MASSA) and a member of the Marshall Society. In September 1988, he began a Master of Philosophy in Economics and Politics of Development at Pembroke College, University of Cambridge, where he was also a member of the Cambridge Union.

== Career ==
=== Rise through CIMB (1989–2014) ===
Upon completing his studies, Nazir initially considered a career in government service, including the Malaysian diplomatic corps, in line with his father's earlier wish that one of his sons would enter the civil service. However, in 1989, he began his professional career in investment banking. After evaluating offers from several firms, including Arab–Malaysian Merchant Bank, he chose CIMB. Although initially rejected due to his lack of accounting background and the firm's policy against hiring fresh graduates, he was later offered a position. On 11 September 1989, he joined CIMB as its first-ever fresh graduate recruit, becoming employee number sixty-nine at the firm's Kuala Lumpur headquarters.

CIMB was a relatively small merchant bank at a time. During this period, Nazir took on diverse responsibilities, from arranging travel and accommodations for Tenaga Nasional's management to discussing valuations with international partners and distributing retail application forms to the public. In April 1993, Nazir was appointed Senior Vice-President (SVP) of CIMB Securities. In 1996, he was appointed deputy CEO of CIMB. He later reflected on the 1997 Asian financial crisis, describing it as the merger of risky behaviour among developed market investors and corruption among Asian politics and financial institutions. After accumulating ten years of experience across various aspects of merchant banking, Nazir was appointed CEO of CIMB on 1 June 1999, at the age of thirty-two. His appointment followed discussions with regulatory authorities, including Bank Negara, who initially hesitated due to his age but ultimately approved his leadership.

In 2002, Nazir joined the Employees Provident Fund (EPF) investment panel. In 2005, Khazanah Nasional became the largest shareholder following the merger of CIMB and Bumiputra Commerce Bank, and Nazir acquired a significant stake in the newly formed universal bank. He oversaw the $1.8 billion acquisition of Southern Bank in 2006. Although revenues were affected by the 2008 global financial crisis, CIMB's profits subsequently recovered. In 2009, CIMB expanded its regional operations through Bank Niaga in Indonesia and opened branches in Cambodia. That year, Nazir became aware of a bond issued by the Terengganu Investment Authority, which was later renamed 1Malaysia Development Berhad (1MDB), after CIMB's head of debt markets brought the transaction to his attention. Nazir questioned the pricing and distribution of the bond, which he believed had resulted in several hundred million ringgit being given up by 1MDB, and said he subsequently became suspicious of the organisation's activities. His involvement in these matters exposed him to professional and personal challenges, including public scrutiny and criticism related to his family connections.

By 2010, under Nazir's leadership, CIMB had grown to become Malaysia's second-largest Islamic bank with a 15% market share and played a role in the US$17.9 billion initial public offering of AIA in Hong Kong. In April 2012, CIMB Group acquired the majority of Royal Bank of Scotland's cash equities and associated investment banking operations in the Asia-Pacific region for £173.9 million ($279 million), expanding its regional investment banking operations. On 1 September 2014, Nazir was appointed to the board of directors of Khazanah Nasional, Malaysia's sovereign wealth fund, and stepped down as CEO of CIMB Group to become its chairman. He also served as president commissioner of PT Bank CIMB Niaga, deputy chairman of CIMB Bank, and chairman of CIMB Investment Bank.

=== 1Malaysia Development Berhad scandal (2015–2016) ===
By 2015, Nazir's involvement in the 1MDB scandal received increased media attention following reports by The Edge, The Wall Street Journal, and Sarawak Report concerning transactions involving his account. He also engaged with state rulers, politicians, regulators, ambassadors and former prime minister Mahathir Mohamad as the controversy developed. Separately, $681 million was deposited into the personal account of his elder brother, Prime Minister Najib, with reports linking the funds to 1MDB. Najib denied taking the money for personal gain, while the Malaysian Attorney General stated that it was a political donation from the Saudi royal family, a claim supported by Saudi Foreign Minister Adel al-Jubeir, who said the donation was genuine. The available information does not indicate that any portion of the $681 million was transferred to Nazir; his involvement concerned a separate transaction of approximately $7 million.

On 18 April 2016, Nazir took voluntary leave of absence from his position as chairman of CIMB Group while the bank reviewed the transfer of approximately $7 million into his personal account before the 2013 general election. The funds, reportedly provided by Najib, were subsequently distributed to politicians from the ruling party through CIMB employees acting on Najib's instructions. Nazir confirmed the disbursements and said he believed the money had been raised legally through donations from Malaysian corporations and individuals for election purposes and was unaware of any other source. He said the account was closed with a zero balance after the transactions. The matter attracted media attention and raised corporate governance concerns because Nazir was both Najib's brother and chairman of CIMB Group.

CIMB began its review on 5 April 2016, with Ernst & Young assisting with the independent investigation. On 19 May 2016, CIMB announced that the investigation had cleared Nazir of wrongdoing, after which he resumed his responsibilities as chairman of CIMB Group and director of CIMB Bank.

=== Beyond CIMB (2016–present) ===
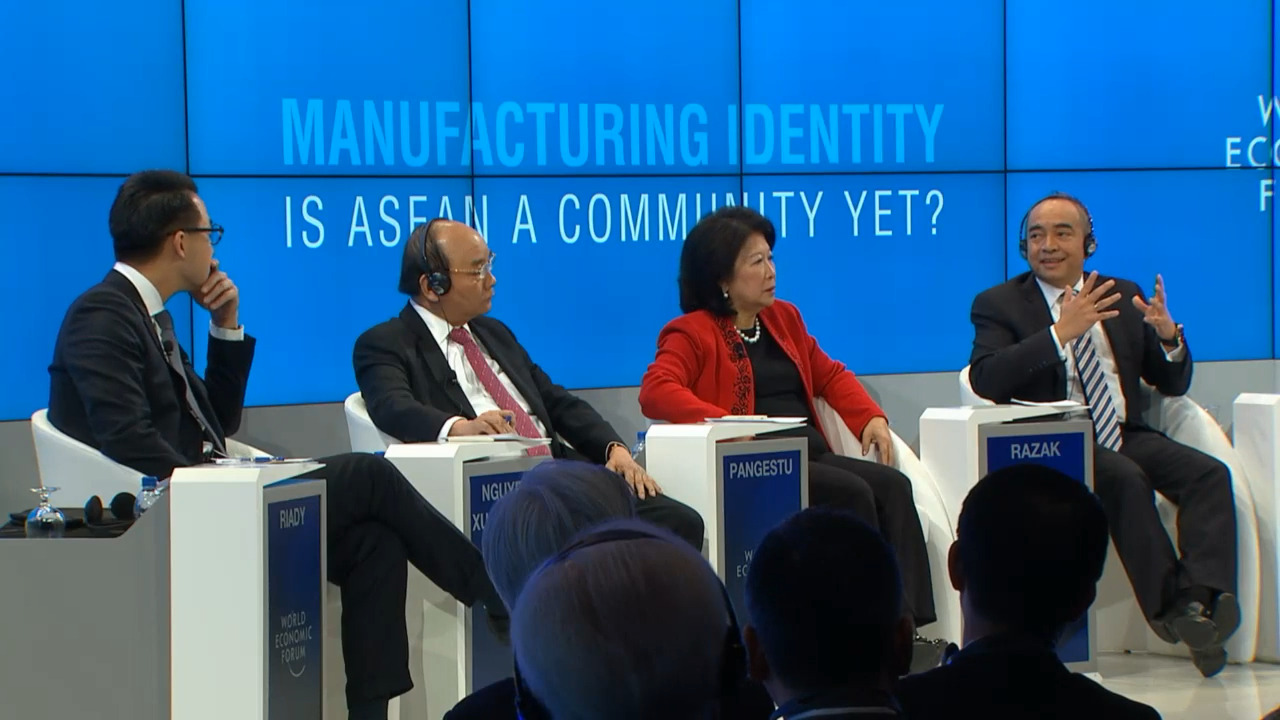
From left to right: John Riady, Nguyễn Xuân Phúc, Mari Elka Pangestu and Nazir at the World Economic Forum Annual Meeting 2017 in Davos

In October 2016, Nazir was appointed as the inaugural chair of the World Economic Forum's ASEAN Regional Business Council, a platform aimed at promoting trust and co-operation between the public and private sectors in the region. He stepped down from the EPF investment panel on 31 May 2017 after 15 years of service. Nazir stepped down as chairman of CIMB Group Holdings and from all other positions within the CIMB group by 31 December 2018. In October 2019, the Malaysian Anti-Corruption Commission (MACC) announced it was seeking to recover up to $100 million in fines from 80 individuals and entities alleged to have received laundered funds linked to 1Malaysia Development scandal, including Nazir. The MACC stated that he had received approximately 25.7 million ringgit in cheques, though it did not confirm whether these were the same funds reportedly transferred through his account in 2013. Nazir did not immediately respond to the announcement, which formed part of broader recovery efforts under the government of Mahathir following the 2018 general election.

Nazir was appointed as non-executive chairman of Malaysia Development Bank (BPMB) on 22 April 2021. At the time, he was also the chairman and founding partner of Ikhlas Capital, a private equity firm focused on ASEAN markets. During his tenure at BPMB, Nazir oversaw the planned consolidation of Malaysia's development finance institutions, including the merger with Danajamin Berhad. He also launched Agenda 2025, a three-year transformation strategy, and introduced the Measuring Impact on National Development framework to evaluate loans and investments. After two years, he retired from his role as non-executive chairman on 22 April 2023.

== Personal life ==
Nazir Razak is of Bugis descent and has several siblings, including his eldest brother, Najib. He married Azlina Aziz, daughter of former Central Bank of Malaysia governor Abdul Aziz Taha, in 1992. They had two children, Arman and Marissa, and divorced in 2023. On 17 November 2023, Nazir married Yati Zainuddin, a businesswoman whom he had first met while they were both studying in the United Kingdom.

In 2026, Nazir was featured in a Malaysian series Kudrat:1968

== Awards and honours ==
=== Awards ===
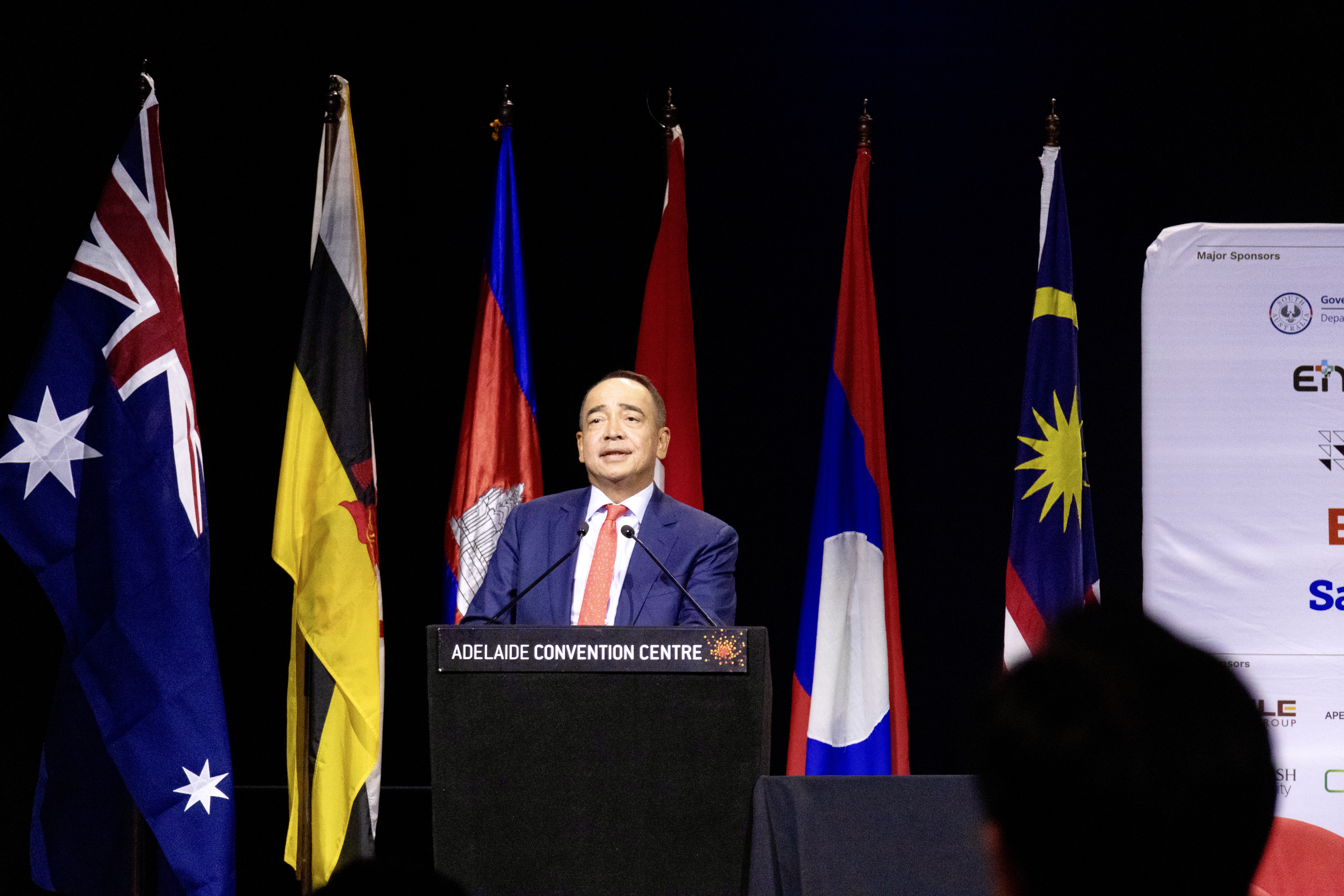
Nazir speaking at the Australia–ASEAN Business Forum 2025 at the Adelaide Convention Centre

Nazir was associated with the expansion of CIMB from a small investment bank in Kuala Lumpur into a commercial and retail banking group operating across ASEAN. In 2009, he was appointed a Chevening Fellow at the Oxford Centre for Islamic Studies. That same year, he became the youngest recipient of FinanceAsia's "Lifetime Achievement Award," recognising his contributions to the Asian financial markets. He was further honoured with Euromoney's "Outstanding Achievement Award" in 2012. In 2015, Nazir received the Asia House Asian Business Leaders Award for promoting cooperation and partnership across ASEAN through both his business initiatives and support for research and charitable projects.

Nazir continued to engage with academic and leadership institutions, serving as a member of the International Advisory Board at the Blavatnik School of Government, University of Oxford, from 2015. In 2019, he was named a Transformational Leadership Fellow at the Blavatnik School, and in 2023 he received the Alumni Award for Business and Industry from the University of Bristol, recognising his leadership achievements, experiences, and advocacy for regional economic integration.

=== Honours ===
- Malaysia
  - Commander of the Order of Loyalty to the Crown of Malaysia (PSM) – Tan Sri (2021)
- Pahang
  - Knight Grand Companion of the Order of Sultan Ahmad Shah of Pahang (SSAP) – Dato' Sri (2007)
  - Knight Grand Companion of the Order of the Crown of Pahang (SIMP) – formerly Dato', now Dato' Indera (2004)
- Selangor
  - Knight Commander of the Order of the Crown of Selangor (DPMS) – Dato' (2015)

== Bibliography ==
- Nazir Razak (2021). What's in a Name: Family, career and the heart of Malaysia. Whitefox Publishing. ISBN 978-1-913532-60-4.
