= Bukit Kiara Muslim Cemetery =

Cemetery in Kuala Lumpur, Malaysia

- Interactive map of Bukit Kiara Muslim Cemetery

Details
- Established: 1985
- Location: Damansara, Kuala Lumpur
- Country: Malaysia
- Coordinates: 3.133°N 101.632°E
- Type: Public Muslim cemetery
- Owned by: Dewan Bandaraya Kuala Lumpur (DBKL); Jabatan Agama Islam Wilayah Persekutuan (JAWI)
- Size: 14.43 acres (5.84 ha)
- Website: E-Pusara

The Bukit Kiara Muslim Cemetery is a cemetery in Kuala Lumpur, Malaysia, at Damansara near Taman Tun Dr Ismail. It is the burial place of many prominent Malays.

== Background ==
The cemetery was originally planned to be called Pusara Negara (National Cemetery), a special cemetery for people "who have done great service to the country", spanning over 92 hectares and divided into sections for different religions. It was expected to be completed in 1988.

The Bukit Kiara Muslim Cemetery was opened in 1985. There are four phases at this cemetery. Phase 1 was opened in 1985 and Phase 2 opened in 2008. Phase 3 and 4 remained for future uses.

== Notable burials ==
- Kamaluddin Muhamad (Keris Mas) – National Laureate (Sasterawan Negara), died 1992
- Jaffar Hussein – 4th Governor of the Central Bank of Malaysia, died 1998
- Normadiah – actress, died 2000
- Usman Awang – National Laureate (Sasterawan Negara), died 2001
- Mohammad Noordin Sopiee – Executive Chairman of the Institute of Strategic and International Studies (ISIS), died 2005
- Abdullah Mohd Salleh, Chief Secretary to the Government and founder of the Universiti Kebangsaan Malaysia, died 2006
- Syed Hussein Alatas – Vice-Chancellor of the University of Malaya and founder of the Parti Gerakan Rakyat Malaysia, died 2007
- Megat Junid Megat Ayub – cabinet minister and Minister of Domestic Trade and Consumer Affairs, died 2008
- Rustam Abdullah Sani – Political writer and Parti Rakyat Malaysia deputy president, died 2008
- Abdul Samad Ismail – Journalist, National Journalism Laureate, writer and editor died 2008
- Arena Wati – National Laureate (Sasterawan Negara), died 2009
- Ibrahim Hussein – artist, died 2009
- Mohamed Yaacob – Menteri Besar of Kelantan, died 2009
- Mohamed Rahmat – Minister of Information and UMNO secretary general, died 2010
- Abdul Ajib Ahmad – Menteri Besar of Johor (Chief Minister) (1982–1986), died 2011
- Azah Aziz – wife of economist Ungku Abdul Aziz, died 2012
- Ali Abul Hassan Sulaiman - 6th Governor of the Central Bank of Malaysia, died 2013
- Aishah Ghani – Welfare Minister, died 2013
- Hussain Ahmad Najadi – Arab Malaysian Banking Group (AmBank) founder, died 2013
- Azean Irdawaty – actress and singer, died 2013
- Sharifah Aini – singer and entertainer, died 2014
- Mohd Bakri Omar – Inspector General of Police, died 2014
- Datuk Abdullah Hussain – National Laureate (Sasterawan Negara), died 2014
- Shahrum Yub – Director General of the National Museum of Malaysia, died 2016
- Siti Rahmah Kassim – politician, died 2017
- Sanusi Junid – Minister of National and Rural Development, Minister of Agriculture and seventh Menteri Besar of Kedah (1996–1999), died 2018
- Hashim Aman – 7th Chief Secretary to the Government of Malaysia, died 2018
- Abdullah Ayub – 6th Chief Secretary to the Government of Malaysia, died 2018
- Mokhtar Hashim – Minister of Culture, Youth and Sports, died 2020
- Ungku Abdul Aziz – economist, died 2020
- Railey Jeffrey – Deputy Minister of Information and Deputy Minister of Works, died 2020
- Ghazali Mohd Seth – 7th Chief of the Malaysian Defence Forces, died 2021
- Mohd Zaman Khan – Bukit Aman Criminal Investigation Department (CID) director and Director-General of the Prisons Department (1994–1997), died 2021
- Sabbaruddin Chik – Minister of Culture, Arts and Tourism, died 2021
- Jit Murad – actor, writer, playwright and theatre activist, died 2022
- Tengku Tan Sri Ahmad Rithauddeen Tengku Ismail – Minister of Defence, died 2022
- Tunku Abdul Aziz – corporate figure, activist and politician, died 2023
- Mohammed Hanif Omar – 4th Inspector-General of Police, died 2024
- Mohamed Dzaiddin Abdullah – 3rd Chief Justice of Malaysia, died 2024
- Daim Zainuddin – Minister of Finance, died 2024
- Syed Muhammad Naquib al-Attas − Muslim philosopher and Royal Professor, died 2026
- Marina Md Yusoff – lawyer, businesswomen, and politician, former deputy chief of Wanita UMNO, former Vice President of Parti Keadilan Nasional, mother to actress Ida Nerina, died 2026
- Maria Menado – actress, died 2026
