= Malaysia Development Bank =

Bank Pembangunan Malaysia Berhad
- Formerly: Bank Pembangunan dan Infrastruktur Malaysia (1998–2005) (Note: The Bank was initially known as Bank Pembangunan Malaysia Berhad in 1973, later renamed as Bank Pembangunan dan Infrastruktur Malaysia Berhad in 1998. The bank reverted to its original name in 2005.)
- Company type: Public
- Industry: Banking; Financial services
- Founded: 28 November 1973; 52 years ago
- Headquarters: Kuala Lumpur, Malaysia
- Area served: Nationwide
- Key people: Roni Abdul Wahab (Group CEO); Tan Sri Mohamed Nazir Abdul Razak (Chairman)
- Owner: Minister of Finance Incorporated
- Website: www.bpmb.com.my

Bank Pembangunan Malaysia Berhad (BPMB; English: Malaysia Development Bank Limited, formerly known as Bank Pembangunan dan Infrastruktur Malaysia or Malaysia Infrastructure and Development Bank), also known simply as Bank Pembangunan is a development bank in Malaysia. Established in 1973, the bank's activities are to provide medium to long-term financing to capital-intensive industries, which include infrastructure projects, maritime and high technology sectors and making a number of strategic investments. It is owned by the Minister of Finance Incorporated.

== History ==
Bank Pembangunan was established under the Malaysian Companies Act 1965 on 28 November 1973, with its initial objective was to assist entrepreneurs involved in small and medium-sized industries through the provision of various financing facilities, training and entrepreneurial advisory services. In addition to providing direct financing, Bank Pembangunan through its subsidiaries and associated companies facilitates the growth of Malaysia's strategic economic sector.

In 2019, Bank Pembangunan and Danajamin receive approval from Bank Negara Malaysia on account of merger plans. Bank Pembangunan asset is estimated to be RM 26.6 billion.

In 2020, the bank was one of list of banks to provide assistance to customers whose business operations affected by the COVID-19 pandemic.

On 1 May 2025, Bank Pembangunan completes the acquisition of EXIM Bank Malaysia and SME Bank.

== See also ==
- List of banks in Malaysia
