= Jalan Ampang Muslim Cemetery =

Muslim cemetery in Kuala Lumpur, Malaysia

Jalan Ampang Muslim Cemetery Tanah Perkuburan Islam Jalan Ampang تانه ڤرقبورن اسلام جالن امڤاڠ
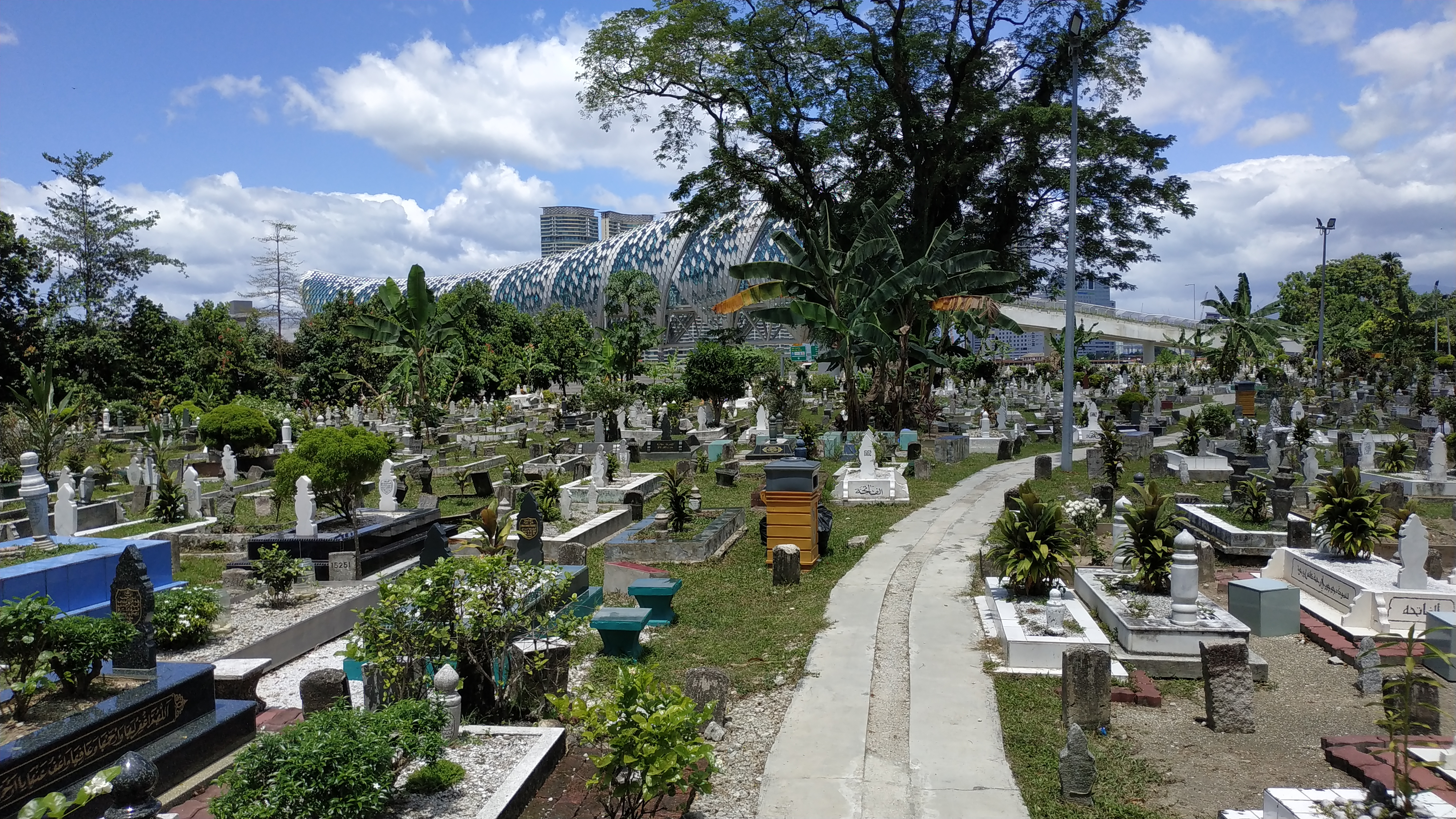
- Cemetery with Saloma Link in the background
- Interactive map of Jalan Ampang Muslim Cemetery; Tanah Perkuburan Islam Jalan Ampang تانه ڤرقبورن اسلام جالن امڤاڠ

Details
- Established: 1819
- Location: Jalan Ampang, Kuala Lumpur
- Country: Malaysia
- Coordinates: 3°09′36″N 101°42′27″E
- Type: Public Muslim cemetery
- Owned by: Dewan Bandaraya Kuala Lumpur (DBKL); Jabatan Agama Islam Wilayah Persekutuan (JAWI)

The Jalan Ampang Muslim Cemetery (Malay: Tanah Perkuburan Islam Jalan Ampang; Jawi: تانه ڤرقبورن اسلام جالن امڤاڠ) is a cemetery at the Kuala Lumpur city centre, Malaysia. It is located at Jalan Ampang near Kuala Lumpur City Centre. The cemetery was established on 1819.

== Notable burials ==
- P. Ramlee – film actor, director, singer, and songwriter. (died 1973)
- Tan Sri Zainal Abidin Ahmad (Za'aba) – Malaysian writer and linguist. (died 1973)
- Salmah Ismail (Saloma) – Singapore-born Malaysian film actress, singer and also wife of Tan Sri P. Ramlee. (died 1983)
- Abdul Rahman Hashim – Inspector General of Police (died 1974, in an assassination carried out by communist subversives during the Communist insurgency in Malaysia (1968–89))
- Abdul Malek Yusuf – Second Malacca state Yang di-Pertua Negeri (Governor) (1959–71) (died 1977)
- Tan Sri Yaacob Abdul Latiff - Second Mayor of Kuala Lumpur (died 1985)
- Mubin Sheppard – Former Director-General of the National Archives of Malaysia, renowned historian and academic. (died 1994)
- Ibrahim Din – veteran actor (died 1996)
- Ismail Mohamed Ali – Second Governor of Bank Negara Malaysia (died 1998)
- Nasir P. Ramlee – son of late P. Ramlee (died 2008)
- Ainuddin Wahid – educationist and Universiti Teknologi Malaysia (UTM) Vice Chancellor (died 2013)
- Salma Ismail – first Malay woman doctor (died 2014)
- Mustapha Maarof – veteran actor (died 2014)
- Cik Puan Noor Yvonne Abdullah – Wife of Malaysian political, Tengku Razaleigh Hamzah (died 2015)
- Mariani Ismail – veteran actress and also sister of late actress Salmah Ismail (Saloma) (died 2015)
- ms:Sheikh Salim Sheikh Muhammad Al Mahros – veteran singer (died 2016)
- Elyas Omar – third Mayor of Kuala Lumpur (died 2018)
