= Central Bank of Malaysia =

State-owned bank in Malaysia

Central Bank of Malaysia Bank Negara Malaysia (BNM) بڠک نݢارا مليسيا

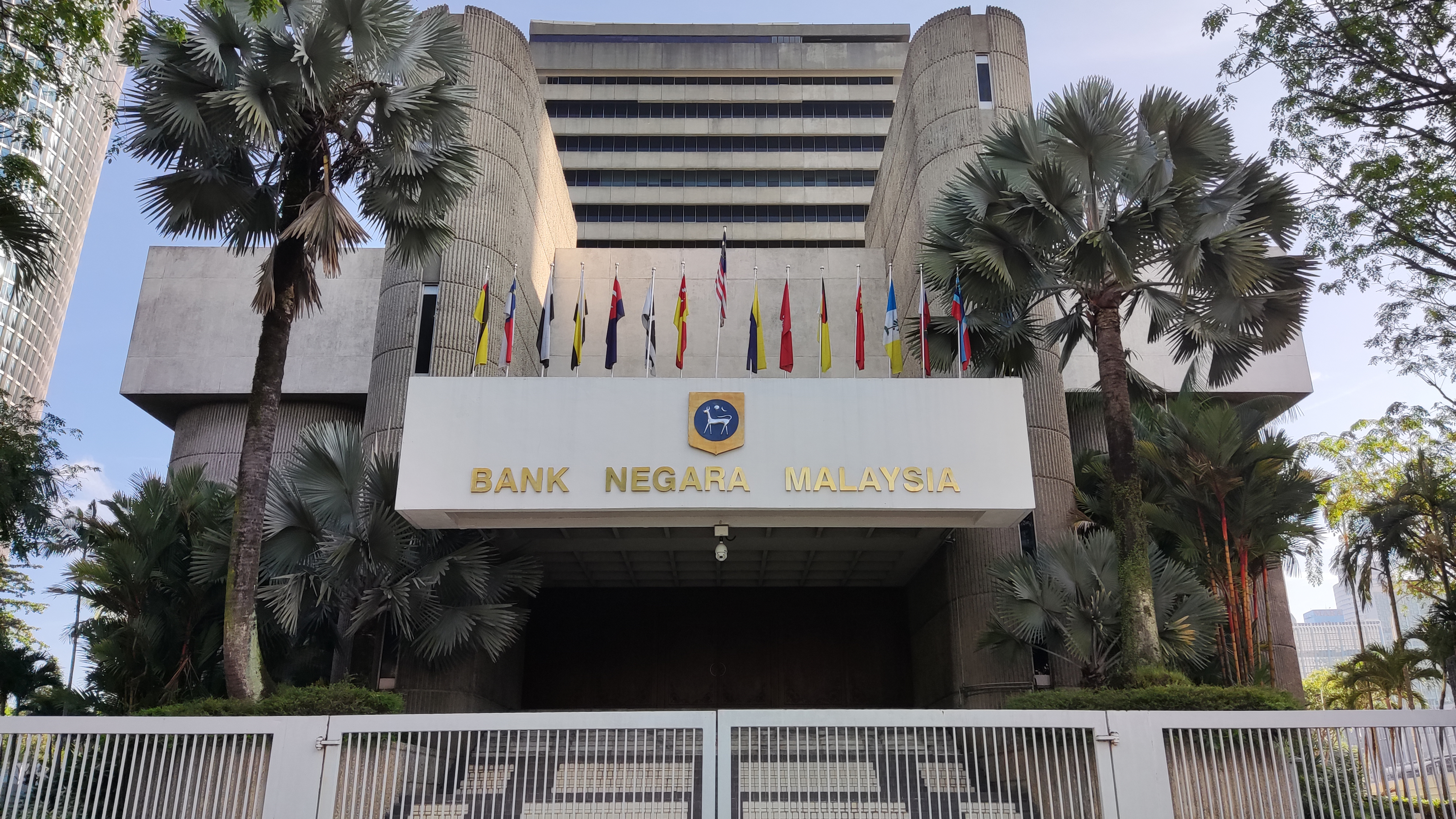
- BNM headquarters in Kuala Lumpur
- Central bank of: Malaysia
- Headquarters: Jalan Dato Onn, Kuala Lumpur, Malaysia
- Established: 26 January 1959; 67 years ago
- Ownership: Government of Malaysia
- Governor: Dato' Sri Abdul Rasheed Ghaffour
- Currency: Malaysia Ringgit; MYR (ISO 4217)
- Reserves: US$125.53 billion (as of 31 Dec 2025)
- Bank rate: 2.75%
- Website: www.bnm.gov.my

The Central Bank of Malaysia (BNM; Malay: Bank Negara Malaysia; Jawi: بڠک نݢارا مليسيا) is the Malaysian central bank. Established on 26 January 1959 as the Central Bank of Malaya (Bank Negara Tanah Melayu), its main purpose is to issue currency, act as the banker and advisor to the government of Malaysia, and regulate the country's financial institutions, credit system, and monetary policy. Its headquarters is located in Kuala Lumpur. The central bank is the only institution permitted to issue the Malaysian ringgit into circulation.

== Powers of the Bank ==
The Central Bank is empowered through enactment of legislation by the Parliament of Malaysia. New legislation are created and current legislation is amended to reflect the needs of the time and future.

=== Development Financial Institutions Act 2002 ===
Promotes the development of effective and efficient development financial institutions.

=== Central Bank of Malaysia Act 2009 ===
Provides the establishment, administration and powers of the bank. This act repealed the Central Bank of Malaysia Act 1958.

=== Money Services Business Act 2011 ===
Provides for regulation of money services business industry which consists of remittance, wholesale currency and currency exchange businesses.

=== Financial Services Act 2013 ===
Consolidates the regulatory and supervisory framework for Malaysia's banking industry, insurance industry, payment systems, and other relevant entities. The Act also includes money market oversight and foreign exchange administration matters. This act repealed Banking and Financial Institutions Act 1989, Insurance Act 1996 (though sections 144, 147(4), 147(5), 150, 151 and 224 of the Insurance Act 1996 continue to remain in full force and effect by virtue of section 275 of FSA 2013), Payment Systems Act 2003 and Exchange Control Act.

=== Islamic Financial Services Act 2013 ===
Sets out the regulatory framework for Malaysia's Islamic financial sector with the principal regulatory objectives of promoting financial stability and compliance with Shariah. This act repealed Islamic Banking Act 1983 and Takaful Act 1984.

== Governors ==
No.	Governor	Period
1	Tan Sri William Howard Wilcock	26 January 1959 – July 1962
2	Tun Ismail Mohamed Ali	July 1962 – July 1980
3	Tan Sri Abdul Aziz Taha	July 1980 – June 1985
4	Tan Sri Dato' Jaffar Hussein	June 1985 – May 1994
5	Tan Sri Dato' Ahmad bin Mohd Don	May 1994 – August 1998
6	Tan Sri Dato' Seri Ali Abul Hassan Sulaiman	15 September 1998 – 30 April 2000
7	Tan Sri Dato' Sri Dr. Zeti Akhtar Aziz	1 May 2000 – 30 April 2016
8	Tan Sri Muhammad bin Ibrahim	1 May 2016 – 15 June 2018
9	Tan Sri Nor Shamsiah Mohd Yunus	1 July 2018 – 30 June 2023
10	Dato' Sri Shaik Abdul Rasheed Abdul Ghaffour	1 July 2023 – present

== Headquarters and branches ==
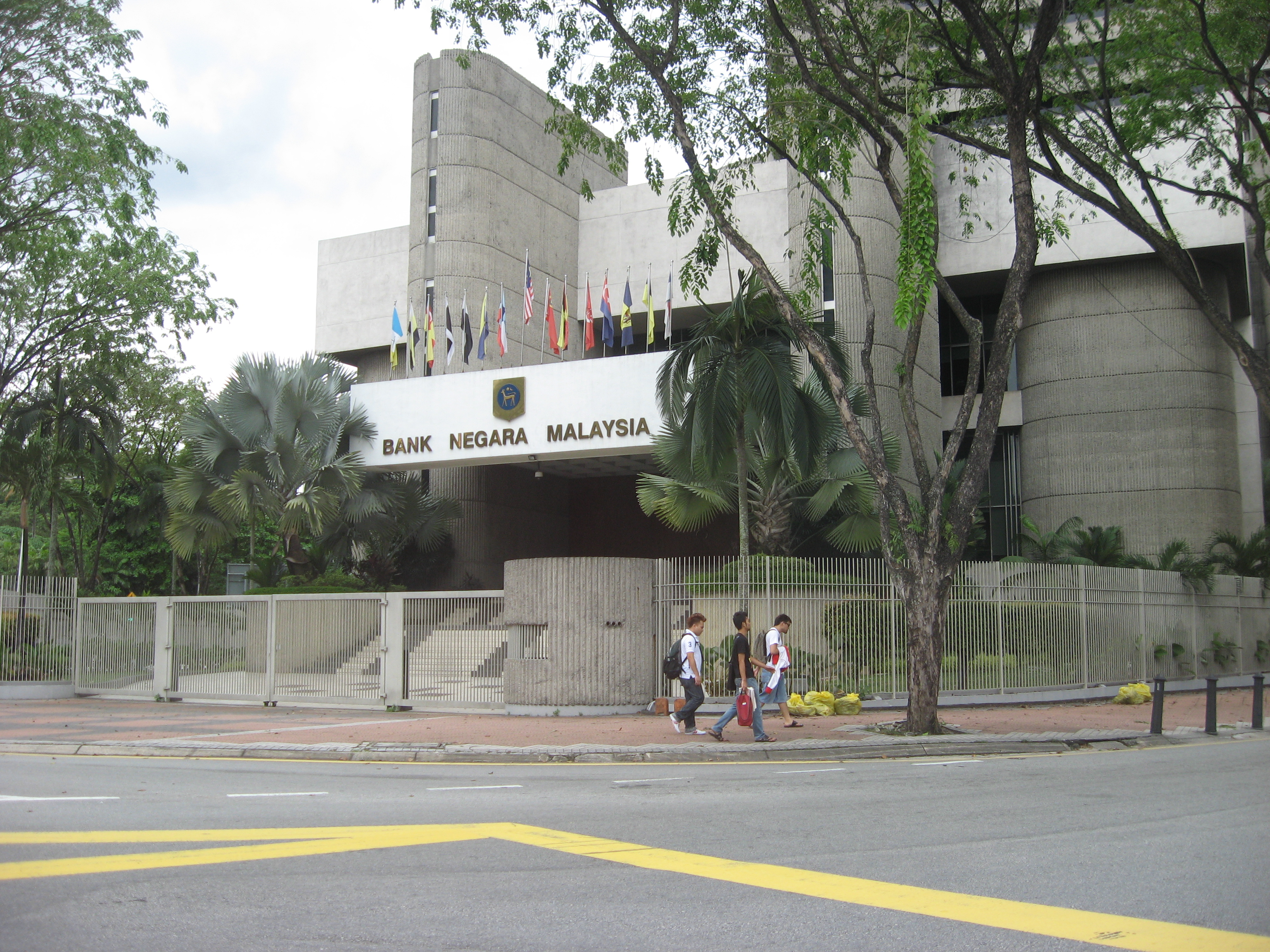
Bank Negara Malaysia.

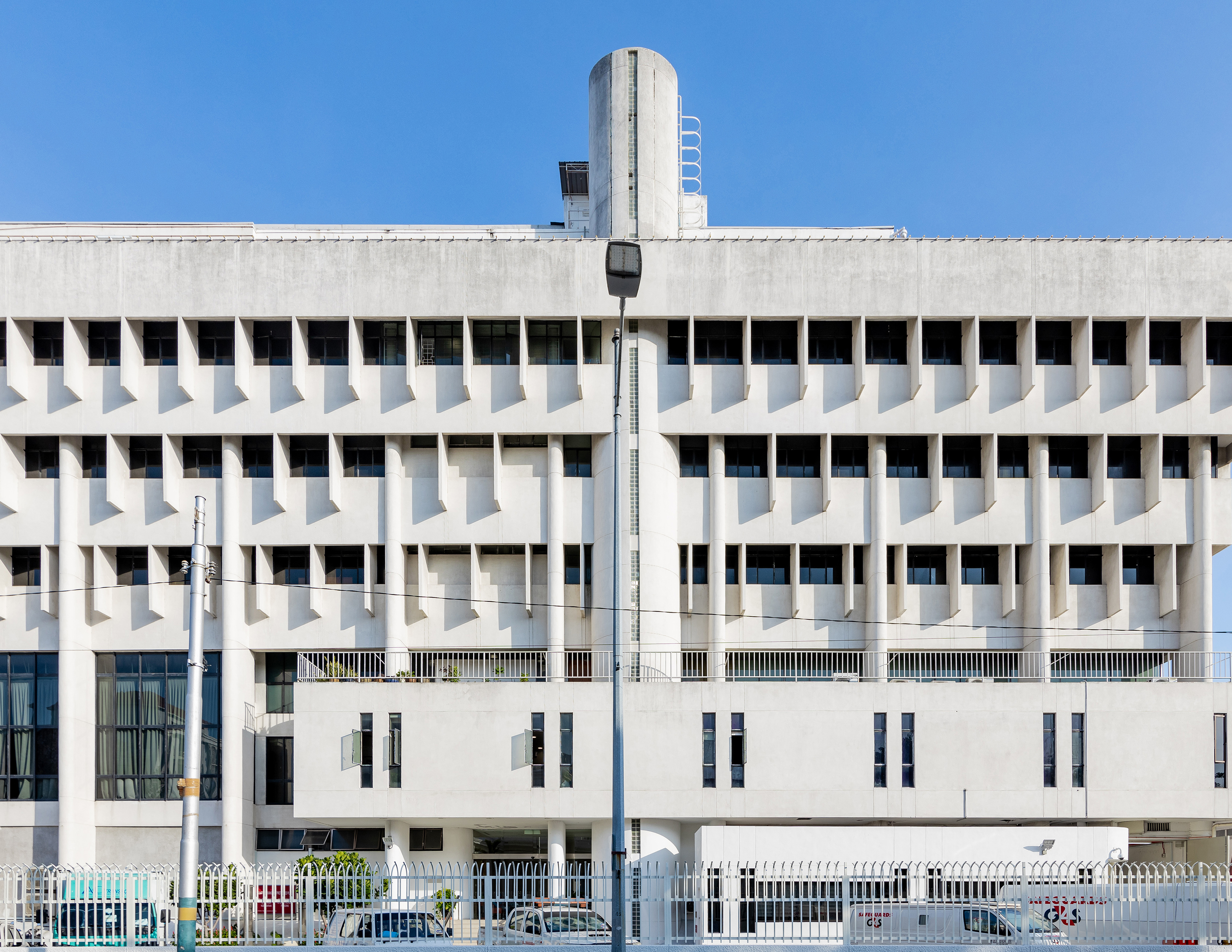
Bank Negara Malaysia, Penang

The Central Bank headquarters are located at Jalan Sultan Salahuddin, off Jalan Kuching.

Landmarks located near the Central Bank building include Dataran Merdeka, St Mary's Cathedral, Kuala Lumpur City Hall building, Lake Gardens, Kuala Lumpur and the Tugu Negara.

The Central Bank had previously maintained branches in each of the state capitals. Most of them were closed in the 1990s when retail banks began taking over most of the counter services. There are still branches maintained in Penang, Johor Bahru, Kota Kinabalu, Kuching, Kuala Terengganu and Shah Alam. Some branches were converted into currency distribution and processing centres.

The Central Bank also retains representative offices in London, New York City, and Beijing.

A new building for the Financial Services and Resources Center (FSRC) was constructed in 2004 to house the FSRC, SEACEN, IFSB and the FMAG (the museum arm of BNM). Located along Jalan Dato Onn, the building was designed by renowned Malaysian architect firm, Hijjas Kasturi Associates. Officially declared opened in August 2011, the building is now known as Sasana Kijang.

== History ==
In 1837 the Indian rupee was made the sole official currency in the Straits Settlements, but in 1867 silver dollars were again legal tender. In 1903 the Straits dollar, pegged at two shillings and fourpence (2s. 4d.), was introduced by the Board of Commissioners of Currency for the Straits Settlements and private banks were prevented from issuing notes. Since then, there were two lapses in the continuity of the currency, first by the Japanese occupation (1942–1945), and again by the devaluation of the Pound Sterling in 1967 when notes of the Board of Commissioners of Currency, Malaya and British Borneo lost 15% of their value.

On 12 June 1967, the Malaysian dollar, issued by the new central bank, Central Bank of Malaysia, replaced the Malaya and British Borneo dollar at par. The new currency retained all denominations of its predecessor except the $10,000 denomination, and also brought over the colour schemes of the old dollar.

In 1985, following the "Plaza meeting" of G-5 finance ministers in New York City, the US dollar fell sharply causing major losses in Central Bank's dollar reserves. The bank responded by starting a program of aggressive speculative trading to make up these losses. Jaffar Hussein, the Central Bank Governor at the time, referred to this strategy as "honest-to-God trading" in a December 1988 speech in New Delhi.

In the late 1980s, Central Bank, under Governor Jaffar Hussein, was a major player in the forex market. Its activities caught the attention of many; initially, Asian markets came to realise the influence the Central Bank had on the direction of forex market. Alan Greenspan, the Federal Reserve's chairman, later realised BNM's massive speculation activities and requested the Malaysian central bank to cease those activities.

On 21 September 1990, BNM sold between $500 million to $1 billion worth of pound sterling in a short period of time, driving the pound down 4 cents to the dollar. In response, bankers began front running the Central Bank's orders. Two years later on Black Wednesday, BNM attempted to defend the value of the British pound against attempts by George Soros and others to devalue the pound sterling. George Soros won and BNM reportedly suffered losses of more than US$4 billion. The Central Bank lost an additional $2.2 billion in speculative trading a year later. By 1994, the bank became technically insolvent and was bailed out by the Malaysian Finance Ministry.

=== Pegging of the ringgit and reserves ===
In 1998, Central Bank pegged RM3.80 ringgit to the US dollar after the ringgit substantially depreciated during the 1997 Asian financial crisis. In July 2005, the central bank abandoned fixed exchange rate regime in favour of managed floating exchange rate system an hour after China floated its own currency. This resulted in capital flight of more than US$10 billion, thought to be due to the repatriation of speculative funds that entered the country in anticipation of the abandonment of the peg: Central Bank's foreign exchange reserves increased by $24 billion in the one-year period between July 2004 and July 2005 (see table below). During this period there was widespread belief that the ringgit was undervalued and that if the peg was removed, the ringgit would appreciate.

The Central Bank continues to run a negative interest rate differential to the USD. The ringgit has appreciated gradually since the peg was abandoned and as at 28 May 2007, it traded at around RM3.40 to the US dollar. Malaysia's foreign exchange reserves have increased steadily since the initial capital flight, and as at 31 March 2007 the reserves stood at approximately US$88 billion, which is approximately $10 billion more than the reserves just prior to the peg being abandoned.

On 31 July 2007, the Malaysian reserves stood at approximately US$98.5 billion, which is equivalent to RM340.1 billion. The figure increased to US$101.3 billion on 31 December 2007, which is equivalent to RM335.7 billion. Central Bank's international reserves increased further 15 days later to US$104.3 billion or RM345.4 billion.

Central Bank Foreign Exchange Reserves (Source: Central Bank, rounded to the nearest billion USD)
31 December 2004	US$66 billion
31 July 2005	US$78 billion
31 December 2007	US$101 billion
31 March 2008	US$120 billion
31 December 2010	US$107 billion
31 December 2012	US$140 billion
31 December 2014	US$116 billion
30 December 2016	US$95 billion
31 December 2018	US$101 billion
31 December 2019	US$104 billion
31 December 2020	US$108 billion
31 December 2021	US$117 billion
30 December 2022	US$115 billion
29 December 2023	US$114 billion
31 December 2024	US$116 billion
31 December 2025	US$126 billion

=== Project Nexus ===
The Bank for International Settlements signed an agreement with Central Bank of Malaysia, Bank of Thailand, Bangko Sentral ng Pilipinas, Monetary Authority of Singapore, and the Reserve Bank of India on 30 June 2024 as founding member of Project Nexus, a multilateral international initiative to enable retail cross-border payments. Bank Indonesia involved as a special observer. The platform, which is expected to go live by 2026, will interlink domestic fast payment systems of the member countries.

== See also ==
- Bank Negara Monetary Notes
- International Centre for Education in Islamic Finance
- Real-time gross settlement
- List of central banks
- List of financial supervisory authorities by country
