= TechUspech =

Russian economic rating of innovative companies

Innovative companies rating «TechUspech» — a Russian economic rating of innovative companies, founded by Russian Venture Company, Foundation for Assistance to Small Innovative Enterprises in Science and Technology, the Foundation for infrastructure and educational programs RUSNANO and OJSC Russian Bank for Small and Medium Enterprises (SME Bank). Association of Innovative Regions of Russia is an operator of the rating.

== Criteria ==
The list of cretaria:

- A company is originated and developed in Russia’s recent history (i.e., not 1987)
- A business is built and developed on the basis of the development and commercialization of high-tech products
- Annual turnover from the sale of its own high-tech products is 100 million rubles. and more
- A company shows a strong positive trend of sales
- A company sales its own high-tech products in many regions of Russia, and perhaps begins to expand to foreign markets

== Most innovative companies in 2012 year ==
30 Most innovative companies in Russia

* 2GIS	* IT
* Alawar	* Biocad
* Geropharm	* Group Unihimtek
* CFT Group	* Diakont
* Danaflex	* Lyudinovocable (Athol)
* Interskol	* Median-Filter
* World Farm	* NEARMEDIC PLUS
* NIPK Electron	* Nipomo
* Novomet-Perm	* NPO Special Materials; NPP Binar
* NPP Prima	* APF Packer
* PC Autocomponent	* Forecast
* PF SKB Kontur	* RAMEK-Sun
* Svemel	* RDC
* Gull-NN	* Elar
* Eltex	* ER-Telecom

10 Most innovative companies in Russia

- IT group of companies
- Unihimtek Group
- CFT Group
- Diakont
- Interskol
- NEARMEDIC PLUS
- Novomet-Perm
- Ramek
- Svemel
- Elar
- ER-Telecom
