= Bank Negara Monetary Notes =

Securities issued by Central Bank of Malaysia

Bank Negara Monetary Notes (BNMN) are securities issued by Central Bank of Malaysia replacing the existing Bank Negara Bills (BNB) for purposes of managing liquidity in both the conventional and Islamic financial market. The maturity of these issuances has been lengthened from one year to three years however, this is not intended to signal any targeted level of long-term interest rates. The Overnight Policy Rate remains the sole indicator of the monetary policy stance while short-term and long-term interest rates at other maturities will continue to be market determined, reflecting overall demand and supply conditions as well as prevailing interest rate expectations in the financial market. New issuances of BNMN may be issued either on a discounted or a coupon-bearing basis depending on investors' demand. Discount-based BNMN will be traded using the same market convention as the existing BNB and Malaysian Treasury Bills (MTB) while the coupon-based BNMN will adopt the market convention of Malaysian Government Securities (MGS).The inaugural issuance was on 8 December 2006 with an issue size of RM1. billion.

BNMN are tradable on yield basis (discounted rate) based on bands of remaining tenure (e.g., Band 4= 68 to 91 days to maturity). The standard trading amount is RM5 million.
