= Masam Masam Manis =

1965 film by P. Ramlee

- Directed by: P. Ramlee
- Written by: P. Ramlee
- Screenplay by: P. Ramlee
- Starring: P. Ramlee; Sharifah Hanim; Mariani Ismail; Mahmud Jun
- Music by: P. Ramlee
- Production company: Merdeka Film Productions
- Distributed by: Shaw Organisation
- Release date: 21 August 1965 (Malaysia)
- Country: Malaysia
- Language: Malay

Masam Masam Manis (English: Sourness and Sweetness) is a 1965 Malaysian Malay-language black-and-white romantic comedy film directed by and starring P. Ramlee, Sharifah Hanim, Mariani Ismail and Mahmud Jun.

== Plot ==
Set in 1965 Kuala Lumpur, the story follows Sha'ari, a teacher who moonlights as a musician, and Norkiah, a young woman renting the room next to his. Both work at a nightclub, with Norkiah performing alongside her dancer friend, Mariani. Sha'ari and Norkiah often quarrel, with one incident involving Norkiah accidentally throwing a portrait meant for Sha'ari at the wrong person, sparking chaos among the tenants.

At school, Sha'ari struggles with his double life. During a Malay language lesson, a student's humorous misinterpretation of his example sentence about playing ball leads to classroom chaos. This prompts the headmaster, Mohd Basar Muhammad, to reprimand him for violating both school regulations and Islamic values by working in nightclubs during weekdays. Sha'ari promises to stop performing on weekday nights.

Their dynamic changes when Sha'ari helps Norkiah retrieve her stolen purse on a bus, leading to romance. However, Norkiah hides the truth about her job, claiming she teaches at a cooking school. Meanwhile, her nightclub singing continues. When her mother and brother visit, Sha'ari inadvertently snubs them, not realizing Norkiah is his troublesome neighbor. Later, an argument over laundry escalates, with Norkiah drenching Sha'ari with water. When Sha'ari climbs up to confront her, he discovers she is the woman he loves, and they marry.

Sha'ari asks Norkiah to quit her job, but she is bound by a contract. One night, he is invited to perform at a club and discovers his wife singing under the name Norkiah Hanum. Furious at her deception, he rebuilds the wall separating their rooms and insults her, calling her a low-class cabaret singer. Norkiah's friends stage a prank, implying she is divorcing Sha'ari and seeing a colleague, Rashid. When Sha'ari bursts into her room, he finds her alone with a tape recorder. Realizing his mistake, he apologizes, and they reconcile.

The story concludes with Sha'ari being promoted to headmaster and the couple raising five pairs of twins.

== Cast ==
- P. Ramlee as Teacher Sha'ari Suleiman
- Sharifah Hanim as Norkiah Hanum
- Mariani Ismail as Rosnah
- Mahmud Jun as Rashid
- Minah Hashim as Mak Minah
- Raden Sudiro as Taxi Driver
- Chik as Mother Norkiah
- Adik Murad as Hashim (Norkiah's younger brother)
- Idris Hashim as Mohd Basar bin Muhammad (Headmaster)
- Sharif Babu as Bag Snatcher
- Nordin bin Hanafi as Head of Class
- Tuan Haji Abdul Razak Ayub as Student Leader

== Songs ==
- Saat Yang Bahagia
- Ku Rindu Padamu
- Dalam Ayer Ku Terbayang Wajah
- Perwira by Saloma
- Ai Ai Twist

== See also ==
- P. Ramlee
- List of P. Ramlee films
