= Shahrum bin Yub =

Malaysian artist (1934–2016)

Shahrum bin Yub (21 April 1934 – 16 December 2016) was a Malaysian Director General of the National Museum of Malaysia.

== Biography ==
Shahrum was born in Tanjung Malim, Perak, Malaysia on 21 April 1934. His parents were Yub bin Rawan (a violin teacher) and ‘Chek’ (a mak yong performer). He passed his School Certificate with a Grade One at the Anderson (Secondary) School in Ipoh and was subsequently awarded a Perak State Scholarship to study anthropology at Leeds University, England. He was the first Malaysian to be awarded a Diploma in Museology from the British Museum. While at Leeds University, he was approached by Tan Sri Mubin Sheppard to join the National Museum in 1966, initially charged with collecting artefacts as a curator of the orang asli gallery. In 1972, he was the first Malaysian to be appointed Director-General of Museums. He retired from public service in 1991 and continued to be involved in the launching of popular exhibitions covering a range of interesting topics.

Shahrum featured regularly in the Lat cartoon series, identified by his bowtie, suits, and curly lock of hair over his forehead.

In 1978, Shahrum was a recipient of the Ramon Magsaysay Award. He was awarded the Dato’ Paduka Cura Simanja (DPCM) in 1981, and in 1989, he was the recipient of the Tun Abdul Razak Foundation Award.

Shahrum died in his home at Bukit Bandaraya, Bangsar on 16 December 2016, at the age of 82. He was buried at the Bukit Kiara Muslim Cemetery, Kuala Lumpur.
