= Overnight policy rate =

Aspect of Malaysia's central bank finance

The overnight policy rate is an overnight interest rate set by Bank Negara Malaysia (BNM) used for monetary policy direction. It is the target rate for the day-to-day liquidity operations of the BNM. The overnight policy rate (OPR) is the interest rate at which a depository institution lends immediately available funds (balances within the central bank) to another depository institution overnight. The amount of money a bank has fluctuates daily based on its lending activities and its customers’ withdrawal and deposit activity, therefore the bank may experience a shortage or surplus of cash at the end of the business day. Those banks that experience a surplus often lend money overnight to banks that experience a shortage so the banking system remains stable and liquid. This is an efficient method for banks around the world to practice 'Accessing short-term financing' from the central bank depositories. The interest rate of the OPR is influenced by the central bank, where it is a good predictor for the movement of short-term interest rates. In 2014, Malaysia's central bank raised its key interest rate for the first time in more than three years, to help temper inflation and rising consumer debt.

In Malaysia, changes in the OPR trigger a chain of events that affect the base lending rate (BLR), short-term interest rates, fixed deposit rate, foreign exchange rates, long-term interest rates, the amount of money and credit, and, ultimately, a range of economic variables, including employment, output, and prices of goods and services which is the micro and macro factors on the economic. The new base rate (BR) framework encourages greater transparency from banks and will enable customers to make better financial decisions. Previously, calculations of BLR lacked transparency and some banks were lending below the BLR to attract customers and boost loan growth. Under the new system, customers cannot borrow below the base rate. The BLR is usually adjusted at the time in correlation to the adjustments of the OPR which is determined by Bank Negara Malaysia during one its monetary policy meetings.

With the new BR, interest rates are determined by the banks’ benchmark cost of funds and Statutory Reserve Requirement (SRR). Other components of loan pricing such as borrower credit risk, liquidity risk premium, operating costs and profit margin will be reflected in a spread in the new BR framework.
