= Tunku Abdul Aziz =

Malaysian politician (1934–2023)

- تونکو عبدالعزيز

Senator from Pulau Pinang
- In office 7 July 2009 – 30 May 2012

Vice-Chairman of the Democratic Action Party
- In office 24 August 2008 – 14 May 2012

Personal details
- Born: Tunku Abdul Aziz bin Tunku Ibrahim; 22 January 1934 Alor Setar, Kedah, British Malaya
- Died: 7 February 2023 (aged 89) National Heart Institute, Kuala Lumpur, Malaysia
- Resting place: Bukit Kiara Muslim Cemetery, Kuala Lumpur
- Party: DAP (2009–2012)

Tunku Abdul Aziz bin Tunku Ibrahim (Jawi: تونکو عبدالعزيز; 22 January 1934 – 7 February 2023) was a Malaysian corporate figure, activist and politician. He held numerous roles in the worldwide anti-corruption movement, most prominently as vice-chairman of the board of directors of Transparency International.

== Biography ==
Tunku Abdul Aziz Tunku Ibrahim was born in Alor Setar, Kedah in 1934. He was a distant member of the Kedah royal family. His father was an officer in the Kedah state police.

Tunku Aziz helped found Transparency International-Malaysia, the local chapter of Transparency International (TI) in 1998. In March of that year, he was elected vice-chairman of TI's board of directors, a position he held until October 2002.

Tunku Aziz played a wide role in fighting corruption and promoting good governance in Asia (including corporate governance). He served as a member of the World Bank High Level Advisory Group on Anti-Corruption in the East Asia and Pacific Region, the Asia Pacific Advisory Panel on Good Urban Governance, the Board of the International Institute of Public Ethics and the United Nations Development Programme Advisory Panel for the 2002 Human Development Report.

From February 2006 to January 2007, he served as special advisor to the Secretary General of the United Nations, Kofi Annan in New York. During his tenure, he set up the UN Ethics Office.

Tunku Aziz joined the Democratic Action Party (DAP) in August 2008, citing shared "values and ideals" with the party. He was immediately appointed national vice-chairman of the party. In July 2009, he was appointed a senator in the Dewan Negara, representing the state of Penang. He is the first senator ever from the DAP.

In May 2012, Tunku Aziz spoke out against the Bersih 3.0 rally which was largely supported by Pakatan Rakyat. He said the event encouraged Malaysians to "break the law." He also criticised rally organisers for allowing the opposition coalition to "hijack" its agenda and failing to curb violence among their own protestors. On 9 May, DAP declined to extend Tunku Aziz's senate term ending on 30 May. Less than a week later, he indicated his desire to resign from the party, citing irreconcilable differences.

Tunku Aziz died on 7 February 2023 at National Heart Institute, aged 89. He was buried at Bukit Kiara Muslim Cemetery in Kuala Lumpur.
