= Ahmad Albab =

1968 film by P. Ramlee

- The one-sheet for Ahmad Albab
- Directed by: P. Ramlee
- Written by: P. Ramlee; A. R. Tompel
- Screenplay by: A. R. Tompel
- Starring: P. Ramlee; Saloma
- Cinematography: Low Yew Wah
- Edited by: Johari Ibrahim
- Music by: P. Ramlee
- Production company: Merdeka Film Productions
- Distributed by: Shaw Organisation
- Release date: 1968
- Country: Malaysia
- Language: Malay

Ahmad Albab (English: Ahmad Albab) is a 1968 Malaysian Malay-language black-and-white comedy-drama film directed by, written by and starring Malaysian artiste P. Ramlee about an arrogant and materialistic man who marries off his outspoken daughter to a poor villager to teach her a lesson. The story is in the style of traditional Malay folktales with an underlying moral message. The movie features real-life husband and wife P. Ramlee and Saloma acting opposite each other.

== Plot ==
Mas'hud Al-Buaya is a rich man who believes that only the rich can be happy, and that he has the power to bestow said wealth and happiness. Mashood has three daughters: Safura and Suhara, who share his life philosophies, and Mastura, who does not and frequently clashes with him. Mashood decides to prove his beliefs by marrying off Safura and Suhara to two men from wealthy families, Muharram and Safar, while Mastura is married off to poor goatherder Syawal.

Syawal and Mastura live a simple but happy life together in Syawal's village. One day while Syawal is herding his goats, one of them wanders away. He follows it into a cave, where he sees a large chest of a treasure. A djinn appears and tells Syawal that the treasure belongs to Ahmad Albab, who is the only person who can claim it. Syawal obeys the djinn and leaves.

Elsewhere, Muharram and Safar have used up their wives' dowry and steal from a jewellery store. They lie to their wives that the money is from their successful business, and they use it to buy the goats that Syawal is herding, putting him out of a job. However, Mastura has started up a small farm near their house, which becomes their new livelihood.

Mashood's birthday arrives, and he invites his daughters and sons-in-law to the celebrations, where they are required to give him a birthday present. Muharam and Safar give him fancy presents which please Mashood. Syawal presents a packet of salt and sugar each, which Mastura explains represents their love for him. Mashood is angered, claiming that love should be like jewels and gold. Mastura then presents to her father a meal she had cooked for him. Mashood attempts to eat it but the food tastes bad, as it has been cooked without salt or sugar. Mastura explains that this is the meaning behind their present, for although salt and sugar are simple things, without them even the most delicious dish does not taste good. Mashood reluctantly accepts Mastura's explanation, but warns them that they won't be able to pull this trick the following year.

The three couples part ways. During this time, Mastura has a baby boy. Although at first Syawal and Mastura are overjoyed, their baby refuses to stop crying for weeks on end. Mastura and Syawal bring their baby to Mashood, and after several attempts to pacify the baby, he gets his grandson to stop crying by tapping on a door. Since the Arabic word for door is "Albab", Mashood names the baby "Ahmad Albab".

Syawal is shocked to hear this name. After returning to the village, he takes his son to the djinn's cave. The djinn sees the baby and says that all the treasure belongs to him, on the condition that Syawal brings Ahmad Albab to the cave every full moon to play with the djinn's wife and son. Syawal and Mastura become wealthy overnight, but even with this wealth they remain humble and help others who are in need.

Meanwhile, Muharram and Safar have run out of money again and try to rob the same jewellery store. This time the store owner is prepared and the pair are captured by the police. Safura and Suhara are told to seek out a kind-hearted man name Syawal who will be able to pay the bail. All are shocked to learn that Syawal and Mastura have become rich, but Syawal and Mastura gladly pay the bail, setting Muharram and Safar free. However, it is time again for Mashood's birthday gathering and his demand for gifts. In desperation, Muharram and Safar attempt to rob Syawal's house, but they are caught. Syawal is disappointed in them, but agrees to give them presents for them to give to Mashood.

On the night of Mashood's birthday celebration, Muharram and Safar are quiet and subdued as Safura and Suhara present Mashood a tray each of precious jewels. Mashood is impressed by the extravagant gifts, then turns to Syawal and Mastura, demanding their present. Syawal gives him a model of a mosque, telling him that it is to remind him of God. Mashood balks at this present until Muharram and Safar break down and confess that they are thieves and all the jewels are from Syawal, not them. Mashood questions this disbelievingly until Syawal opens his robes to reveal a smart white suit underneath. Mashood immediately changes his tune and tries to praise Syawal as an excellent son-in-law, but Syawal reminds him of the lesson he and Mastura are trying to teach, i.e. that happiness and wealth are not inherently intertwined, and that good fortune comes from God, not man.

== Cast ==
- P. Ramlee as Syawal bin Zulhijjah
- Saloma as Mastura, the middle sister
- A. R. Tompel as Mashood Al-Buaya
- Mariani as Safura, the eldest sister
- Mimi Loma (Aminah Ismail) as Suhara, the youngest sister
- Karim Latiff as Safar bin Sahibul, who married Suhara
- Tony Azman as Muharram bin Ainul, who married Safura
- Minah Hashim as Umi, Syawal's mother
- Jah Ismail as Sapari, Mastura's mother
- M. Suki as Sahibul Khastam, Safar's father
- Bakar M. as Ainul Polisi, Muharram's father
- Rohaya Rahman as Safar's mother
- Osman Botak as Worker to Umar Mualim (Goat Owners)
- Ahmad Dadida as Penghulu, chief of Pening Lalat village
- C. R. Bakar as Umar Mualim, Syawal's employer
- Hashim Hamzah as Posto, the postman
- Yusuf Bujang as Amran Al-Intan, the jewellery shop owner
- Sharif Babu as Tuan Sarjana in the Police station
- Idris Hashim as Genie inside the cave
- A. K. Jailani as Jaddam, chief wage earner
- Nor Jin as Jin
- Sazali P. Ramlee as Child Jin
- Yahya Sulong as Mas'hud Al-Buaya friend

The three male characters who married Mashood's daughters are all named after the Islamic months Shawwal, Muharram and Safar.

== Songs ==
- "Ahmad Albab"
- "Pengantin Baru"
- "Malang Nasibku"
- "Kampung Pening Lalat"
- "Suria Bila Tiba"
