= Mariani (actress) =

Malaysian actress (1933–2015)

Mariani مارياني
- Born: Siti Mariam binti Ismail; 20 April 1933; Tanjung Pagar, Straits Settlements (now Singapore)
- Died: 1 December 2015 (aged 82); Sentul, Kuala Lumpur
- Resting place: Jalan Ampang Muslim Cemetery, Kuala Lumpur, Malaysia
- Other name: Mariani
- Occupations: Actress, singer, model
- Years active: 1951–2015
- Spouses: Darus; H. M. Rohaizad @ Syed Hamid Al-Segaf; Mohammad Alias
- Children: 12 (including Melissa Saila & Rozita Rohaizad)
- Relatives: Biduanita Puan Saloma (sister); Aminah binti Ismail @ Mimi Loma (sister)

Siti Mariam binti Ismail (Jawi: سيتي مريم اسماعيل ; 20 April 1933 – 1 December 2015), better known by her stage name Mariani, was a Malaysian-Singaporean Malay actress, singer and model popular during the 1950s and 1960s. She was the older sister of Malaysia's first National Songstress (Biduanita Negara) & actress Puan Sri Saloma and sister-in-law of Malay actor, singer, composer, director, producer Tan Sri Dr P. Ramlee. Mariani was one of the most popular actresses at Jalan Ampas Studios in Singapore at the time, dubbed the "Golden Age of Malay Cinema" at the time. She starred in more than 30 films over her 63-year career span.

== Career ==
Mariam's career began after winning the Singapore Queen Contest in 1951 when she was 17. She was the first lady to ever hold the title. However, she did not represent Singapore at that time. The show has been a stepping stone for her to engage in acting. After that, she was offered an act by Malay Film Productions, but she refused because her ambition was to be a doctor. After two years, after being persuaded by Saloma, Mariani agreed to act. Her first film was Chemburu directed by S. Ramanathan in 1952. After the success of the movie, Mariani was offered another acting role in the company's films including Palace of Dreams, A Return, Labu Labi, Nasib Si Labu-Labi and Tiga Abdul. After the closure of Malay Film Productions and the separation of Singapore from Malaysia, she continued her acting career at Studio Merdeka in Kuala Lumpur. She starred in many films in the studio like Sweet Mashed Film and Discouraged.

In her later years, Mariani continued to act and her latest appearance in films was Pontianak Harum Sundal Malam 2 directed by Shuhaimi Baba in 2005. She also starred in various dramas such as Qalesya, Bila Larut Malam and others more. In 2007, she along with her husband, founded a production company, Kus Semangat Sdn. Bhd., which she owned with her husband, until her death in 2015.

== Death ==
On 1 December 2015, Mariani died after battling with colon cancer, at her home in Taman Kosmo Jaya, Sentul, Kuala Lumpur. She was 82 years old. Her body was sent to Al-Hidayah Mosque in Jalan Sentul and was buried in Jalan Ampang Muslim Cemetery, Kuala Lumpur, near her sister Saloma and her brother-in-law P. Ramlee.

== Filmography ==
=== Film ===
Year	Title	Role	Notes
1953	Chemburu	Mariana	
1953	Raja Sehari		
1953	Istana Impian	Zaiton	
1953	Putus Harapan	Kasma	
1954	Iman	Habibah	
1954	Perjodohan	Salmah	
1954	Merana	Rosni	
1955	Empat Isteri	Ramulah	
1956	Hang Tuah	Dang Rani	
1957	Mogok		
1957	Kembali Seorang		
1958	Taufan	Salmah	
1959	Saudagar Minyak Urat	Hamidah	
1961	Yatim Mustapha	Puteri Selidik Awan	
1961	Sultan Mahmud Mangkat Dijulang	Guntik Istana	
1961	Sri Mersing	Siantan	
1962	Labu dan Labi	Manisah	
1962	Siti Muslihat	Dayang	
1963	Korban		
1963	Darah Muda	Roslin	
1963	Bunga Tanjung		
1963	Darahku	Rohani	
1963	Nasib Si Labu Labi	Manisah	
1964	Tiga Abdul	Hamidah, Sadiq's eldest daughter	
1964	Dupa Cendana	Cendana	
1965	Masam Masam Manis	Rosnah	
1966	Kacha Permata		
1968	Ahmad Albab	Zahara	
1971	Putus Sudah Kasih Sayang	Rosmah	
1974	Setulus Hatimu		
1980	Detik 12 Malam		
1981	Setinggan		
1981	Perjanjian Syaitan	Che Uteh	
1981	Dia Ibuku	Mak Long	
1983	Dendam Dari Pusara	Marini	
1987	Bayangan Cinta		
1987	Sayang		
1988	Perempuan		
1989	Oh Fatimah	Mak Jah	
1989	Kolej 56	Mak Engku	
1992	O.C.J. Operasi Cegah Jenayah	Ibu Laili	
2005	Pontianak Harum Sundal Malam 2	Mak Mah	
2009	Santau	Nenek Jelmaan	
2010	Mantra	Bidan	
2011	Khurafat: Perjanjian Syaitan	Grandmother	
2011	Momok Jangan Panggil Aku	Chu Lamah / Saka	
2012	Jidin Sengal		
2013	Malam... Penuh Bermisteri		
2013	Kisah Paling Gangster	Tok Wan	
2014	Cara Mengundang Hantu		

=== Television series ===
Year	Title	Role	TV channel	Notes
1981	Drama Minggu Ini: Tok Awang		TV1	
1983	Drama Minggu Ini: Hilang	Mak Cik Leha	TV1	
2007	Datin Diaries	Datin Atikah	TV3	
2009	Nenek Kebaya	Nenek Putih	TV3	
2009	Keliwon (Season 1)	Mak Minah	TV3	Episode: "Sungai Puaka"
2009	Keliwon (Season 1)	Mak Nah	TV3	Episode: "Anak Belaan"
2009	Keliwon (Season 2)	Nenek	TV3	Episode: "Syiling Puaka"
2009	Keliwon (Season 2)	Mak Ton/Hantu Geweh	TV3	Episode: "Hantu Geweh"
2010	Ulek Mayang	Mak Yam	TV3	
2011	Terowong	Mak	TV3	Episode: "Kain Kapan"
2011	Tentang Dhia	Ku Mariam	TV3	
2011	Mistik Alam Hitam		Astro Ria & Astro Prima	Episode: "Mayat Hidup"
2011	Mistik Alam Hitam	Nek Tam/Hantu Polong	Astro Ria & Astro Prima	Episode: "Polong Belaan"
2013	Tanah Kubur (Season 9)	Maklong	Astro Oasis	Episode: "Air Kaki Ibu"
2015	Kampung Semarah Padi		TV1	
2015	Hello, Mr. Perfect!	Rina	TV3	

=== Telemovie ===
Year	Title	Role	TV channel
2003	Aisah Lima Puluh Sen	Kuntum	Astro Ria
2009	Namaku Bukan Setsuko	Tijah	TV1
2009	Hantu Raya		Astro Ria
2010	Pontianak Kampung Batu	Mak Kiah	Astro Ria
2011	Mak Andam Semah	Saka	Astro Prima
2011	Pontianak Beraya Di Kampung Batu	Mak Kiah	Astro Ria
2012	Pontianak Masih Beraya Di Kampung Batu	Mak Kiah	Astro Ria
2013	Cinta Laila Majnun	Mother Khalid	Astro Oasis
2013	Nur Hikmah	Opah	Astro Oasis
2016	Dari Kerana Mata		HyppTV
