= Ahmad Mohd Don =

Malaysian banker (1947–2024)

Yang Berbahagia Tan Sri Ahmad Mohd Don PSM SPMJ DMSM KMN

5th Governor of the Central Bank of Malaysia
- In office May 1994 – August 1998
- Preceded by: Jaffar Hussein
- Succeeded by: Ali Abul Hassan Sulaiman

Personal details
- Born: 1947
- Died: 17 September 2024 (aged 77)

Ahmad bin Mohd Don (1947 – 17 September 2024) was a Malaysian banker and chartered accountant who served as the fifth Governor of Bank Negara Malaysia, Malaysia's central bank, from 1994 to 1998.

== Early life and education ==
Ahmad Mohd Don was born in 1947. He graduated from the University of Wales in 1969 with a degree in economics. He was a fellow of the Institute of Chartered Accountants in England and Wales and a member of the Malaysian Institute of Chartered Public Accountants.

== Career ==
Ahmad started his career with the Corp of Accountants, Government of Malaysia between 1972 and 1973 before joining the private sector. He served as financial controller between 1973 and 1980 in companies such as Syarikat Jengka Sdn. Bhd., Mansfield Berhad and Pernas Securities Sdn. Bhd, where he was also the company secretary. In November 1980, he joined Permodalan Nasional Berhad as deputy general manager and was involved in planning and launching the National Unit Trust Scheme in 1981. Subsequently, in April 1983, he joined Malayan Banking Berhad as General Manager, Treasury. During his service with Malayan Banking Berhad, he was promoted to senior general manager and board member, then to executive director and in January 1991, he was appointed group managing director and chief executive officer, a position he held until 1993.

He served as the governor of Bank Negara Malaysia, from May 1993 to August 1998. He replaced Jaffar Hussein, and was followed by Ali Abul Hassan Sulaiman.

Ahmad was latterly a director of MAA Group Berhad (formerly known as MAA Holdings Berhad), Zurich Insurance Malaysia Berhad, KAF Investment Bank Berhad, Hap Seng Plantations Holdings Berhad and JP Morgan Chase Bank Berhad. He is not related to any director and/or major shareholder of United Malacca Berhad and has no personal interest in any business dealings involving the company. He attended all five board meetings held during the financial year ending 30 April 2013.

== Death ==
Ahmad died on 17 September 2024, at the age of 77.

== Honours ==
- Malaysia
  - Officer of the Order of the Defender of the Realm (KMN) (1990)
  - Commander of the Order of Loyalty to the Crown of Malaysia (PSM) – Tan Sri (1997)
- Malacca
  - Companion Class I of the Exalted Order of Malacca (DMSM) – Datuk (1995)
- Johor
  - Knight Grand Commander of the Order of the Crown of Johor (SPMJ) – Dato' (1998)
