= Yahya Sulong =

Malaysian comedian and actor

Yang Berbahagia Datuk Yahya Sulong PJN
- يحيى سولونج
- Born: 1928; Teluk Intan, Perak, Federation of Malaya (now Malaysia)
- Died: 6 February 2013 (aged 84–85); Hospital Besar Kuala Lumpur, Malaysia
- Resting place: Hilir Perak District Muslim Cemetery, Teluk Intan, Perak, Malaysia
- Other names: Pak Ya
- Occupations: Comedian, actor, singer
- Years active: 1961–2013
- Spouse: Datin Alisah Ali (m. 1978; died 2013)
- Children: 11

Datuk Yahya bin Sulong (1928 – 6 February 2013), also known as Pak Ya, was a Malaysian comedian and actor, appearing in 24 films and several television sitcoms.

== Career ==
Sulong made his film debut in Abu Nawas and later appeared in 23 other films, particularly those in the 1980s, including Da Di Du, Putus Sudah Kasih Sayang, Toyol, and Oh Fatimah.

== Personal life ==
Sulong was married to Datin Alisah Ali; prior to their marriage, he had married three other times.

== Death ==
After reportedly suffering from asthma and heart disease prior to his death, Yahya died on 6 February 2013 at the Hospital Kuala Lumpur at 6.45 p.m. local time. He was subsequently buried in Teluk Intan, Perak.

== Filmography ==
=== Film ===
- Abu Nawas (1961 - First film debut)
- Ahmad Albab (1968)
- Durjana (1971)
- Asmara Kirana (1971)
- Putus Sudah Kasih Sayang (1971)
- Gila-Gila (1979)
- Da Di Du (1981)
- Toyol (1981)
- Si Luncai (1981)
- Serampang Tiga (1981)
- Penyamun Tarbus (1981)
- Manis-Manis Sayang (1983)
- Anak Niat (1984)
- Talak (1984)
- Oh Fatimah (1989)
- Janda Meletup (1990)
- Senario the Movie (1999)

=== Television ===
- Hang Setia

== Bangsawan ==
- Laila Majnun
- Batu Belah Batu Bertangkup
