= Ismail Mohamed Ali =

Second Governor of Bank Negara Malaysia

Yang Amat Berbahagia Tun Dato' Seri Ismail Mohamed Ali SSM SPMS PMN PPM

2nd Governor of the Central Bank of Malaysia
- In office July 1962 – July 1980
- Preceded by: William Howard Wilcock
- Succeeded by: Abdul Aziz Taha

Group Chairman of Permodalan Nasional Berhad
- In office 1978–1996
- Preceded by: Office established
- Succeeded by: Ahmad Sarji Abdul Hamid

Personal details
- Born: 16 September 1918 Port Swettenham, Selangor, Federated Malay States, British Malaya (now Malaysia)
- Died: 6 July 1998 (aged 79) Ampang, Selangor, Malaysia
- Cause of death: Influenza
- Resting place: Jalan Ampang Muslim Cemetery, Kuala Lumpur
- Spouse: Toh Puan Maimunah Abdul Latiff (d. 1996)
- Relatives: Siti Hasmah (sister); Mohamed Hashim Mohd Ali (brother); Ahmad Razali Mohd Ali (brother); Saleha Mohd Ali (sister); Mahathir Mohamad (brother-in-law)

Tun Ismail bin Mohamed Ali (16 September 1918 – 6 July 1998) was a Malaysian banker and civil servant who served as the second Governor of Bank Negara Malaysia from 1962 to 1980 and was the first Malaysian to hold the position. He also served as the first chairman of Permodalan Nasional Berhad (PNB) from 1978 to 1996.

== Early life and education ==
Ismail was born on 16 September 1918 in Port Swettenham, Selangor, then part of the Federated Malay States in British Malaya. He received his early education at a Malay school before attending Victoria Institution in Kuala Lumpur from 1931 to 1938. He entered the University of Cambridge in 1938 to study economics and completed his undergraduate studies in 1941.

Following the outbreak of World War II, Ismail remained in Britain and pursued legal studies at Middle Temple, one of the Inns of Court in London, in 1943. He qualified as a barrister and also obtained a master's degree in economics.

== Career ==
Ismail returned to Malaya after the Second World War and joined the Malayan Civil Service (MCS) in 1946. His early administrative career included serving as Assistant State Secretary in the Selangor State Secretariat from 1948 to 1950, Assistant Secretary in the Economic Division of the Federal Treasury from 1950 to 1953, and Economic Officer in Penang from 1954 to 1955. From 1955 to 1957, he served as Controller of the Trade Division at the Ministry of Commerce and Industry.

Following the independence of the Federation of Malaya in 1957, Ismail was posted to Washington, D.C., where he helped establish the Federation of Malaya's embassy. He served as a minister at the embassy from 1957 to 1958 and subsequently as its Economic Minister from 1958 to 1960. During his international service, he also served as an Executive Director of the International Bank for Reconstruction and Development (IBRD), representing Malaysia and several Southeast Asian and African countries.

In 1960, Ismail returned to Malaya and was appointed Deputy Governor of Bank Negara Malaysia, the country's central bank. He succeeded William Howard Wilcock as Governor in July 1962, becoming the first Malaysian to head the institution. He held the position until July 1980.

In 1977, Ismail chaired a working party which examined the establishment of a national investment institution. The group recommended the formation of Permodalan Nasional Berhad (PNB), and Ismail became PNB's first chairman in 1978.

Ismail was one of the central figures behind the Guthrie Dawn Raid of September 1981.

== Death and legacy ==
Ismail died on 6 July 1998 at the age of 79 in Ampang, Selangor due to Influenza. He was buried at the Jalan Ampang Muslim Cemetery, Kuala Lumpur.

In June 2003, Ismail was posthumously awarded the Transparency International Malaysia National Integrity Medal in recognition of his public service. ,In October 2018, Bank Negara Malaysia organised an exhibition entitled Tun Ismail Ali: Paragon of Trust and Integrity at the Bank Negara Malaysia Museum and Art Gallery.

== Personal life ==
Ismail was married to Maimunah Abdul Latiff, who died in 1996. His siblings included Siti Hasmah, a physician and the wife of former Prime Minister Mahathir Mohamad; Mohamed Hashim Mohd Ali, who later served as Chief of the Malaysian Armed Forces; Ahmad Razali Mohamed Ali, a former Menteri Besar of Selangor.

According to Siti Hasmah, Ismail was fond of cigars and regularly received Cuban cigars from friends in South America.

== Honours ==
=== Honours of Malaysia ===
- Malaysia
  - Commander of the Order of the Defender of the Realm (PMN) – Tan Sri (1964)
  - Recipient of the Malaysian Commemorative Medal (Gold) (PPM) (1965)
  - Grand Commander of the Order of Loyalty to the Crown of Malaysia (SSM) – Tun (1980)
- Selangor
  - Knight Grand Commander of the Order of the Crown of Selangor (SPMS) – Dato' Seri (1977)
