= Muhammad Ibrahim (banker) =

Governor of the Central Bank of Malaysia

Yang Berbahagia Tan Sri Muhammad Ibrahim PSM PJN SJMK SPMS DPMS

8th Governor of the Central Bank of Malaysia
- In office 1 May 2016 – 16 June 2018
- Minister of Finance: Mohd. Najib Abdul Razak; Lim Guan Eng
- Preceded by: Zeti Akhtar Aziz
- Succeeded by: Nor Shamsiah Mohd Yunus

Personal details
- Born: 25 September 1960 (age 66) Batu Gajah, Perak, Federation of Malaya (now Malaysia)
- Education: Harvard Kennedy School; University of Malaya; International Islamic University Malaysia

Muhammad bin Ibrahim (born 25 September 1960) is the former 8th Governor of the Central Bank of Malaysia. He assumed the office of Governor from 1 May 2016 to 16 June 2018.

== Education ==
Muhammad graduated from the Harvard Kennedy School from its Masters in Public Administration programme in 1993. He attended the six-week Advanced Management Programme at Harvard Business School in 2010. He earned a bachelor's degree in accounting from University of Malaya, and a postgraduate diploma in Islamic Banking and Finance from the International Islamic University Malaysia.

== Career ==
Muhammad joined Bank Negara Malaysia in 1984, and was appointed as Deputy Governor in June 2010. He sat on the Bank's Monetary Policy Committee as well as the Financial Stability Committee.

Throughout his service to the Central Bank of Malaysia, he held several posts in several government bodies and companies. He was a member of the board of directors of PETRONAS since 2010, and of the Malaysian Retirement Trust Fund since 2012. He is the chairman of the Asian Institute of Finance since 2016.

During the Asian Financial Crisis, he was the managing director of Danamodal Nasional Berhad, a bank recapitalization agency.

Muhammad was bestowed the Malaysian Federal Award Panglima Setia Mahkota by the Yang di-Pertuan Agong in 2017.

After the collapse of the Barisan Nasional (BN) administration and formation of the new Pakatan Harapan (PH) administration on 10 May 2018, Muhammad resigned almost a month later on 6 June 2018.

== Honours ==
=== Honours of Malaysia ===
- Malaysia
  - Commander of the Order of Loyalty to the Crown of Malaysia (PSM) – Tan Sri (2017)
  - Commander of the Order of Meritorious Service (PJN) – Datuk (2012)
- Kelantan
  - Knight Grand Commander of the Order of the Life of the Crown of Kelantan (SJMK) – Dato' (2016)
- Selangor
  - Knight Grand Commander of the Order of the Crown of Selangor (SPMS) – Dato' Seri (2016)
  - Knight Commander of the Order of the Crown of Selangor (DPMS) – Dato' (2007)
  - Recipient of the Sultan Sharafuddin Silver Jubilee Medal (2026)
