= Shaik Abdul Rasheed Abdul Ghaffour =

Malaysian banker

Yang Berbahagia Dato' Sri Shaik Abdul Rasheed Abdul Ghaffour SSAP DGPN PMW
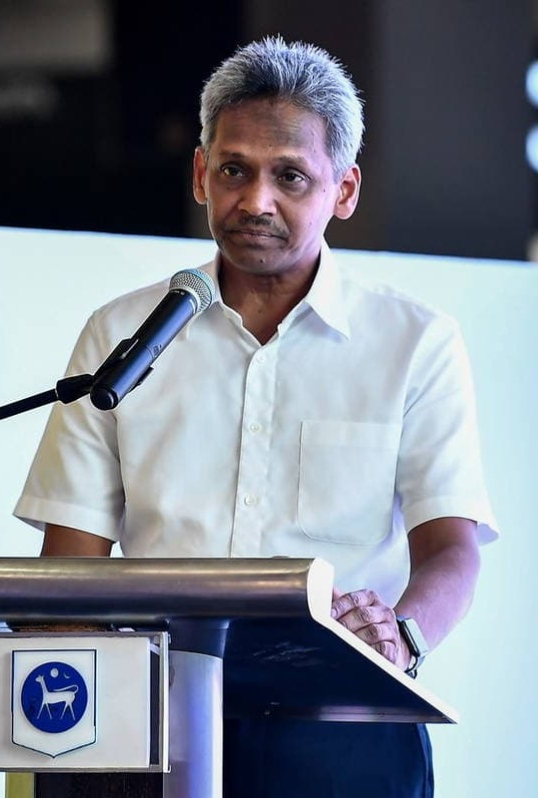

10th Governor of the Central Bank of Malaysia
- Incumbent
- Assumed office 1 July 2023
- Monarchs: Abdullah (2023–2024); Ibrahim Iskandar (2024–present)
- Prime Minister: Anwar Ibrahim
- Minister: Anwar Ibrahim (Minister of Finance I); Amir Hamzah Azizan (Minister of Finance II)
- Preceded by: Nor Shamsiah Mohd Yunus

Personal details
- Born: 16 December 1964 (age 61) Kuala Lumpur, Malaysia
- Education: St. John's Institution
- Alma mater: University of Malaya (BEc.); University of Oxford (MBA)

Shaik Abdul Rasheed bin Abdul Ghaffour is a Malaysian banker who has been the Governor of the Central Bank of Malaysia (BNM) since 1 July 2023. He was previously the deputy governor of the central bank.

== Education ==
He attended St. John’s Institution high school in Kuala Lumpur in his early years. Then he obtained a bachelor's degree in economics from University of Malaya and an MBA from Saïd Business School, University of Oxford.

== Career ==
Shaik Abdul Rasheed started working at BNM in 1988. Throughout his career, he has held various senior management positions and has been a member of the Monetary Policy Committee and the Financial Stability Committee since 2015. He also played an important role in the development and implementation of the Financial Sector Master Plan (2000–2010) and the Financial Sector Plan (2011-2020 and 2022–2026). In 2016, he was appointed Deputy Governor of BNM.

Shaik Abdul Rasheed was appointed 10th Governor of the Central Bank of Malaysia effective from 1 July 2023 for 5 years.

== Honours ==
- Federal Territory (Malaysia)
  - Commander of the Order of the Territorial Crown (PMW) – Datuk (2018)
- Pahang
  - Knight Grand Companion of the Order of Sultan Ahmad Shah of Pahang (SSAP) – Dato' Sri (2025)
- Penang
  - Commander of the Order of the Defender of State (DGPN) – Dato' Seri (2024)

== Views on central banking ==
Shaik Abdul Rasheed told a conference of central bankers in March 2026 that four factors were defining central banking. These were: a shifting global economic landscape, emerging technologies, demographics, and factors affecting trust in central banks. He said that in the face of these challenges, a country's "fiscal, monetary, financial and structural policies" should be aligned in order to best respond. Shaik Abdul Rasheed said he believes that central banks can make economies resilient to shocks, in addition to implementing policies that create stability.

== See also ==
- Governor of the Central Bank of Malaysia
