= SME Bank =

Small Medium Enterprise Development Bank Malaysia Berhad
- Type: Public
- Industry: Banking; Financial services
- Founded: 3 October 2005; 20 years ago
- Headquarters: Kuala Lumpur, Malaysia
- Area served: Malaysia
- Key people: Faizah Mohd Tahir (Chairman); Aria Putera Ismail (CEO)
- Revenue: ▲RM6.5 billion (2017)
- Net income: ▲RM74 million (2017)
- Owner: Minister of Finance Incorporated
- Subsidiaries: Centre for Entrepreneur Development and Research (CEDAR); SMEB Asset Management Sdn Bhd
- Website: www.smebank.com.my

Small Medium Enterprise Development Bank Malaysia Berhad, commonly known as SME Bank, is a Malaysian small and medium enterprise (SME) banking company owned by Minister of Finance Incorporated. The bank's main activity is to provide financial assistance and expertise to small and medium enterprises. Aria Putera Ismail is the CEO of the bank since 3 September 2018.

On 1 May 2025, SME Bank along with EXIM Bank Malaysia was acquired by Bank Pembangunan.

== See also ==
- List of banks in Malaysia
