= Abdul Aziz Taha =

Third Governor of Bank Negara Malaysia

Yang Berbahagia Tan Sri Dato' Abdul Aziz Taha PSM SPMJ DSIJ JMN KMN

3rd Governor of the Central Bank of Malaysia
- In office July 1980 – June 1985
- Preceded by: Ismail Mohamed Ali
- Succeeded by: Jaffar Hussein

Personal details
- Born: 1 April 1936 (age 90) Johor, Unfederated Malay States, British Malaya (now Malaysia)
- Education: Bachelor of Accounting, Institute of Chartered Accountants Australia

Abdul Aziz bin Taha (born 1 April 1936) was the third governor of the Central Bank of Malaysia from July 1980 to June 1985.

== Honours ==
- Malaysia :
  - Officer of the Order of the Defender of the Realm (KMN) (1973)
  - Companion of the Order of the Defender of the Realm (JMN) (1978)
  - Commander of the Order of Loyalty to the Crown of Malaysia (PSM) – Tan Sri (1982)
- Johor :
  - Knight Companion of the Order of Loyalty of Sultan Ismail of Johor (DSIJ) – Dato'
  - Knight Grand Commander of the Order of the Crown of Johor (SPMJ) – Dato' (1980)
