= Saloma =

Singaporean-Malaysian singer and actress (1935–1983)

Yang Berbahagia Puan Sri Datin Amar Saloma KMN (P) AMN
- سالوما
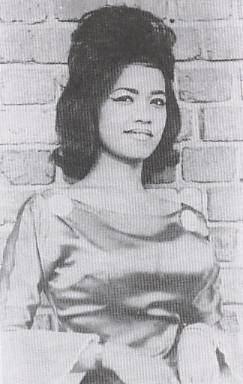
- Born: Salmah binti Ismail; 22 January 1935; Pasir Panjang, Singapore, Straits Settlements, British Malaya
- Died: 25 April 1983 (aged 48); Petaling Jaya, Selangor, Malaysia
- Resting place: Jalan Ampang Muslim Cemetery, Kuala Lumpur, Malaysia
- Occupations: Singer, actress and model
- Years active: 1950–1983
- Known for: Azimat; Seniman Bujang Lapok; Ahmad Albab
- Spouses: A. R. Tompel (m. 1952; div. 1952) Kaswan Yusak (m. 1957; div. 1957) P. Ramlee (m. 1961; died 1973)
- Children: 1 son
- Parents: Ismail bin Osman (father); Umi Kalsom binti Mahban (mother)
- Relatives: Siti Mariam binti Ismail (sister); Aminah binti Ismail (sister); Jasmaniah binti Ismail (sister)

Salmah binti Ismail (Jawi: سلمه بنت إسماعيل; 22 January 1935 – 25 April 1983), better known by her stage name Saloma, was a Singaporean-Malaysian singer, film actress, trendsetter and a fashion icon who became well known in the late 1950s.

Saloma was well known for her singing ability, which was depicted as "lemak merdu", (a full, rather thick but sweet voice). She was signed with EMI music records and since then released numerous EPs such as Dendang Saloma (1957), Bunga Negara (1963) and Aslirama (1972). Some of her most popular songs throughout her career included ‘Selamat Pengantin Baru’ and ‘Bila Larut Malam’.

Saloma also ventured in acting careers when she acted in several films such as Azimat (1958) and Kaki Kuda (1958). Some of her most notable works as an actress were in Seniman Bujang Lapok (1961) as Cik Salmah, Ragam P. Ramlee (1964) and Ahmad Albab (1968) as Mastura.

Saloma was awarded the title Biduana Pertama Negara (First National Songbird) in 1978 for her contribution towards the music industry in Malaysia and the title Puan Sri in 1990, as the wife of Tan Sri Datuk Amar Dr. P. Ramlee.

== Family and early life ==
Saloma was born on 22 January 1935 in Pasir Panjang, in Singapore (At the time one of the Straits Settlements) as Salmah binti Ismail to Ismail Osman and Umi Kalsom Mahban. She had seven siblings and was the third daughter in her family. She had an older sister, Mariani, who was an actress, a younger paternal half-sister, Aminah Ismail (stage name Mimi Loma) and Jasmaniah Ismail, who was also a singer.

During her childhood, Saloma enjoyed singing. She would usually share her thoughts of becoming a singer with her sister, Mariani. At the early age of five, Saloma was already singing with local street bands.

Saloma's parents later divorced. Subsequently, she and Mariani followed their father to Tanjung Karang, Selangor, her father's hometown. Both of them then lived with their father and stepmother. During World War II, they used to help their father in the paddy fields. Unable to cope with the changed situation, the two sisters returned to Singapore without their father. In Singapore, Saloma and her sister Mariani lived with their mother and stepfather (Mum Yusoff) who was a musician with a local keroncong party called The Singapore Boys that was contracted to perform at a club called The New World Cabaret. At age 13, her stepfather brought her to the cabaret and introduced her to the audiences. She was then asked to perform the song "Seven Lonely Days" by Georgia Gibbs. Her singing style and voice impressed the audience there, she continued with a number of other songs and this was the beginning of her career as a singer.

== Career ==
=== Early career: 1949–1953 ===
Saloma's voice began to play in the local radio when her stepfather brought her to see his orchestra performed on Radio Malaya. Singer Rokiah Hanafi, also known as Rokiah Wandah, was scheduled to sing several songs with the orchestra, but did not appear that day. Mum Yusoff decided to persuade Saloma to try to sing the songs that were supposed to be sung by Rokiah. Fortunately, her performance was a success. After that, she received many offers from orchestras throughout Singapore to be their main singer. One of her songs that she sang at Radio Malaya was called "Sang Rang Bulan". The song was played in the film "Rachun Dunia" (Poison of The World) and was once recorded by a local singer named Rubiah.

In 1950, Saloma fell in love with the hero of a film called 'Aloha' after watching the film for the first time. The hero was played by P. Ramlee. At that time, Saloma was only 15 years and 11 months old. Her love for him grew stronger each day and Saloma swore that she would marry the actor one day. During the film blockbuster, P. Ramlee used to walk from his house to the studio. In the middle of the road, he had to walk pass Saloma's house in Mount Emily. Every time he walked towards the house, a Chinese boy selling grass jelly would run to Saloma 's house to tell her about the presence of her beloved hero. Saloma would then tease P. Ramlee by calling out "Banjo" (the character he played in the film) and then hid when he turned around to see who had called out to him.

During the early 1950s, her dream of becoming a singer did not go the way she wanted. Instead, she started her career as a film actress, offered by Nusantara Film. Her first film was entitled Pelangi (Rainbow), which received positive reviews from audiences. After that, she received a few offers from Nusantara Film to act in other films. In that period, she acted in two other films; 'Perkahwinan Rahsia' (Secret Wedding) and 'Norma'. In January 1952, she was offered a minor role as a club singer in a film called 'Chinta Murni' (True Love) by Nusantara Film, directed by Aman Ramlie or better known as A. R. Tompel (Aman Ramli Jaafar). At the time, it was her fourth film.

After her last film with Nusantara Film Company, titled Sesal Tak Sudah (Lasting Regret), Saloma immediately ended her contract with the company. The reason given was that she needed a rest because of her pregnancy and her refusal to work with A.R Tompel, her ex-husband, any longer. At the end of 1952 until 1953, Saloma ended her career as a performer.

=== Restart: 1954–1960 ===
After returning from her travel to Sarawak and Brunei on 23 July 1954, the Pathe Company offered to record her voice. It was strongly supported by Syed Hamid, known as S. Hamid, who rose to fame at that time. They knew each other after acting in the film Sesal Tak Sudah. A song titled "Pandang Kasih" (Look of Love), composed by Rahmat Ali and lyrics by Ismadi, is a rumba-style while the song "Jika Tak Berjumpa" (If We Don't Meet) came from Arabic melodies which was then recomposed by S. Hussein Bagushir and lyrics by Wan Chu. Both of the songs were accompanied by Orkes Al Aishu Wal Meleh, conducted by S.Omar Bagushir. Saloma's first solo and also her first song recorded on vinyl by the Pathe Company (numbered PTH 143) was "Pandang Kasih" while the song "Jika Tak Berjumpa" was her first duet with S. Hamid.

In 1955, Saloma was offered an acting role in a film by Malay Film Productions which she accepted. Her first film with Malay Film Productions was titled Empat Isteri (Four Wives). This was last film directed by B.S. Rajhans. The film also starred Daeng Haris, Normadiah, Latifah Omar and Salmah's sister, Mariam (as Mariani). During the year, Salomah also recorded several songs including "Burong Punggok" (The Owl). In February 1956, she was offered to replace actress Siput Sarawak in the film Adekku (My Younger Sibling). There were rumours that Siput Sarawak had quit after most of the movie's scenes were recorded.

After her success as a singer and also an actress, Shaw Brothers studio decided to give her a more commercial name. She got her stage name based on the film 'Salome' starring Rita Hayworth. In the same year, Saloma joined Panca Sitara, a band led by P. Ramlee.

=== International success: 1961–1968 ===
Saloma began singing at the age of seven and was a professional singer by the time she was in her teenage years. Her singing was more in the style of Ella Fitzgerald and Doris Day. While she did become an actress later on, she always said she preferred singing over acting. As a singer, she sharpened her talent with Orkes Fajar Murni, led by Yusof Osman, during the early year of her career. She was also involved with another orchestra, Panca Sitara, in the 1960s.

She appeared alongside her husband P. Ramlee as guest stars in the 1963 Shaw Brothers film Love Parade (花團錦簇).

== Personal life ==
In April 1952, a few months after the release of Chinta Murni, Malay film fans were shocked by the news that announced her marriage with A.R Tompel. At that time, A.R Tompel was a well known director and comedian while she was only beginning to be recognised with the film Norma. Their marriage lasted five months and they were divorced in September 1952 when Saloma was pregnant with their child.

According to her sister, Mariam, she was brought back to their house in Mount Emily to live with their mother.

In 1953, she gave birth to a son and only child, Armali Bin Aman Ramlie.

Saloma married the film actor, director, singer, songwriter, composer and producer P. Ramlee in 1961. She was also previously been married to Kaswan Yusak.

After the death of her husband, P. Ramlee, in 1973, Saloma was overwhelmed with grief and depression that took a toll on her health. It led her to suffer from a number of illnesses which caused her to look thin and sickly. She was admitted to Assunta Hospital, Petaling Jaya, Selangor before her death on 25 April 1983 at the age of 48 caused by liver failure associated with jaundice. She was buried at the Jalan Ampang Muslim Cemetery, Kuala Lumpur between the graves of her ex-husband Aman Ramlie and husband P. Ramlee.

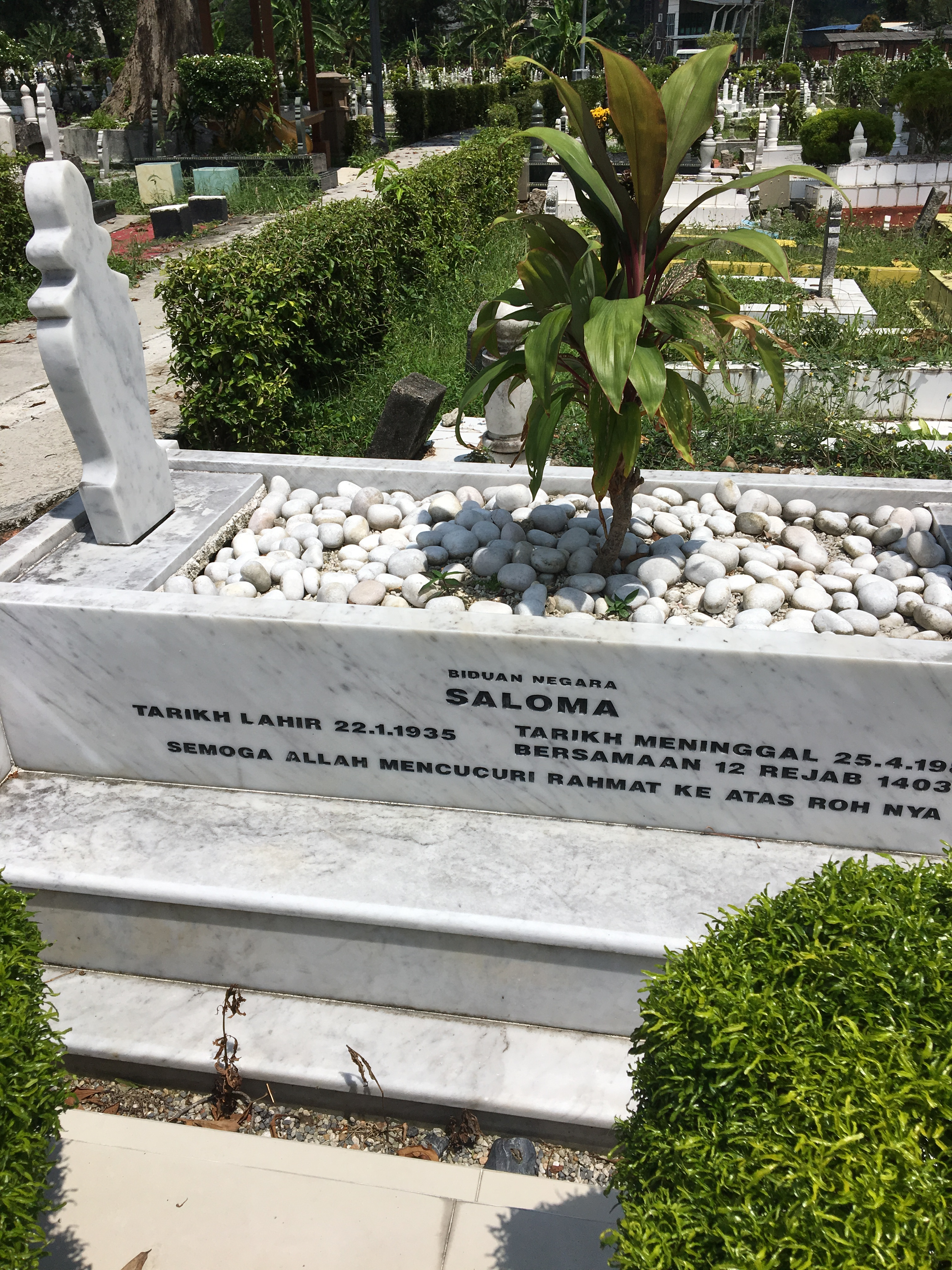
Saloma's gravesite at Jalan Ampang Muslim Cemetery, Kuala Lumpur

== Legacy ==
In 1978, she was awarded by the Malaysian government at the Kecapi Awards as Biduanita Negara (National Songbird).

The Saloma Bistro and Theatre Restaurant at Jalan Ampang, Kuala Lumpur was opened in 2003 and named after Saloma in honour of her contribution to the Malaysian entertainment industry. The Saloma Link, a pedestrian footbridge close to her grave, is also named after her. During her heyday, Saloma was also known as the 'Marilyn Monroe of Asia', due to her ability to attract male adulation like the Hollywood actress Marilyn Monroe.

In 2014, a two-part film titled Saloma Part 1: Mencuri Guruh and Saloma Part 2: Pandang Kaseh was made and Saloma was portrayed by Nabila Huda.

Saloma was celebrated on a Google Doodle on 26 November 2020.

== Discography ==
=== Albums ===
“EP" Albums by Saloma

- Dendang Saloma (1957)
- Dendang Saloma Album II (1957)
- Dendang Saloma Album III (1959)
- Bunga Negara (1963)
- Saloma (Damak) (1964)
- Lagu-2 Sukaramai China Di Nyanyikan Oleh Saloma (1964)
- Saloma Dan Ahmad Daud (1964)
- Sekalung Sakura Dari Saloma (1965)
- Saloma (Pulau Menghijau) (1965)
- Gadis Langkawi (1966)
- Sudah Kawin Kah Belom/Kenangan Di Padang Kota (Saloma dan Ahmad Daud)
- Guitar Berbunyi/Bintang Hati (Daripada Filem "Do-Re-Mi") (1966)
- Saloma (Menanti Kanda) (1967)
- Saloma (Aku Dia dan Lagu) (1968)
- Saloma (Entah Di Mana) (1969)
- Saloma (Chinchin Ku Ini) (1970)
- Saloma (Jangan Chemburu) (1971)
- Saloma (Aslirama) (1972)

== Filmography ==
=== Film ===
Year	Title	Role	Notes
1955	Empat Isteri	Rokiah	
1958	Azimat	Unknown	
1958	Kaki Kuda	Bedah	
1959	Saudagar Minyak Urat	Unknown	Cameo appearance
1961	Seniman Bujang Lapok	Salmah	
1962	Labu dan Labi	Biduanita Saloma (Herself)	Special appearance (singer - Bila Larut Malam)
1963	Nasib Si Labu Labi	Biduanita Saloma (Herself)	Special appearance (singer)
1964	Madu Tiga	Unknown	Special appearance (singer)
1964	Tiga Abdul	Herself	Cameo appearance
1965	Dajal Suci	Herself	Cameo appearance
1965	Ragam P. Ramlee	Herself	Special appearance
1966	Do Re Mi	Unknown	Guest appearance
1966	Sabaruddin Tukang Kasut	Puteri Sabarina	Cameo appearance
1966	Nasib Do Re Mi	Unknown	Cameo appearance
1967	Keluarga 69	Unknown	Cameo appearance
1968	Ahmad Albab	Mastura	She and her sisters played the roles of sisters in the film
1968	Anak Bapak	Unknown	Cameo appearance
1970	Doktor Rushdi	Unknown	Cameo appearance
1971	Putus Sudah Kasih Sayang	Unknown	Cameo appearance
1981	The Malay Trader	Unknown	
1983	Bila Hati Telah Retak	Herself	Cameo appearance

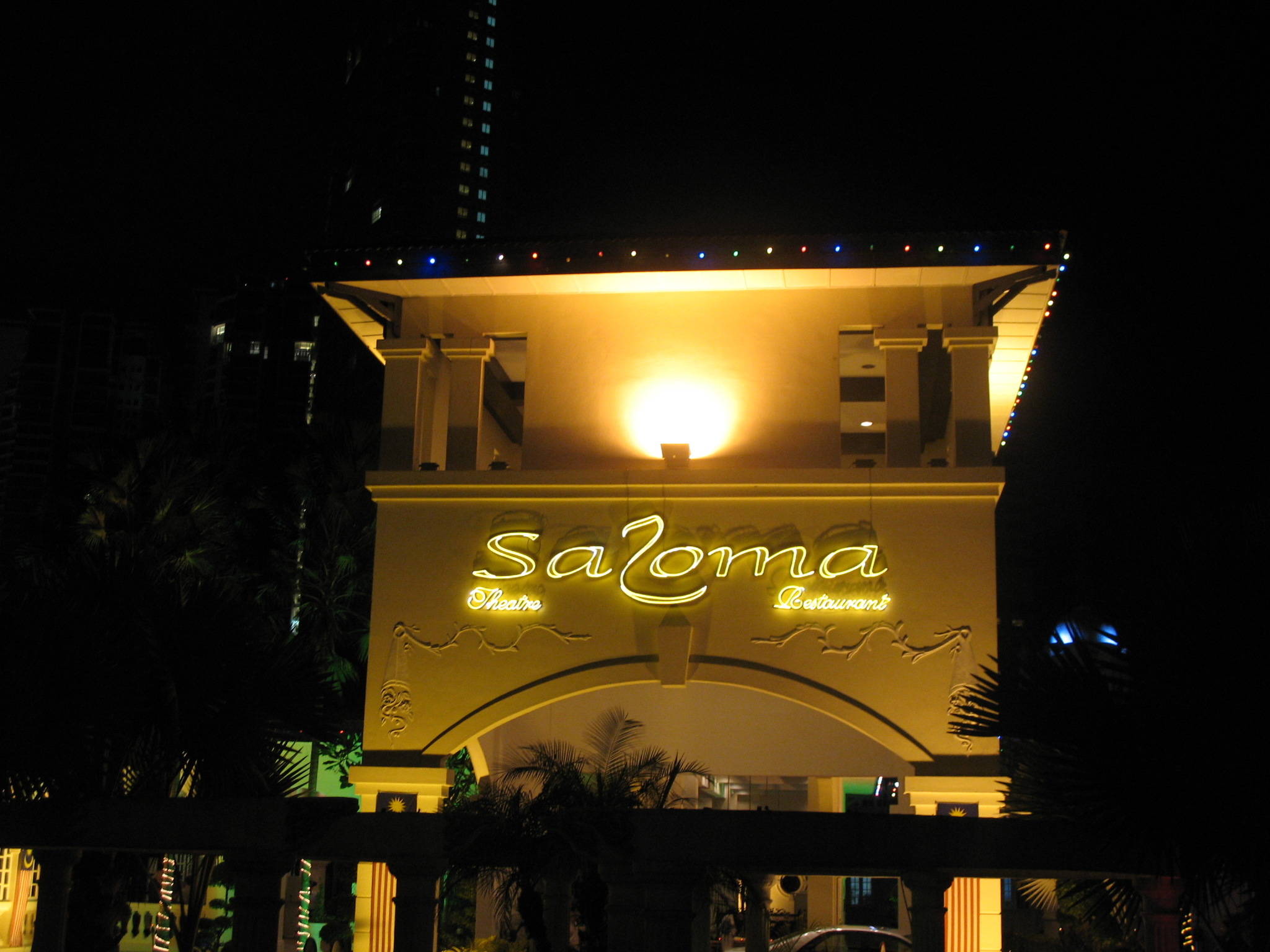
Saloma Bistro and Theatre Restaurant, named after Saloma in honour of her contribution to the entertainment industry of Malaysia.
