= Southern Bank =

- Industry: Banking
- Founded: 1901; 125 years ago
- Headquarters: Mount Olive, North Carolina
- Parent: BancShares
- Website: www.southernbank.com

Southern Bank is a community bank headquartered at Mount Olive, in Wayne County, North Carolina. It was established in 1901, and operates as a wholly owned subsidiary of BancShares, which was founded and established as Southern BancShares in 1982. The bank is classified as a commercial bank as per the Federal Deposit Insurance Corporation. It operates 57 branches across North Carolina, and Virginia.

== History ==
Southern Bank was originally established as the "Bank of Mount Olive" on 29 January 1901, at Mount Olive, in Wayne County, North Carolina. In 1967, the bank was renamed as Southern Bank and Trust Company. The bank acquired Merchants & Farmers Bank based out of Macclesfield, North Carolina in 1973. Southern BancShares Inc., based out of North Carolina, was founded and established as the holding company of Southern Bank in 1982. In 1986, Southern BancShares was reorganized and merged with BancShares, based out of Delaware, with Southern Bank becoming its primary subsidiary.

In 1986, it acquired the Tarheel Bank & Trust Company based in Gatesville, North Carolina. It made a slew of further acquisitions in the 1990s, including Citizens Savings Bank, based out of Rocky Mount, North Carolina, in 1993, and Enfield Savings Bank, based out of Enfield, North Carolina, in 1998. On 23 September 2011, Bank of the Commonwealth, based out of Norfolk, Virginia, was closed by the Virginia State Corporation Commission, and all the deposit accounts were acquired by the Southern Bank and Trust Company, thereby marking its entry into the state of Virginia.

On 21 October 2015, Southern BancShares announced an agreement with Heritage Bankshares, based out of Norfolk, under which Heritage Bank would be merged into Southern Bank. Heritage Bank operated five branches at the time of the announcement. The merger was effective 1 February 2016, following the approval by the shareholders of Heritage, of whom 81.7% voted in favour of the transaction.

== Organisation ==
Southern Bank currently operates 57 branches across two states, with 47 branches in North Carolina and 10 branches in Virginia. The bank's headquarters is located at 100 North Center Street, Mount Olive, North Carolina since April 1996. The bank is classified as a commercial bank as per the Federal Deposit Insurance Corporation. As of the time of the Heritage merger in early 2016, Southern Bank had approximately US$2.2 billion in total assets.
