= Jaffar Hussein =

4th Governor of the Central Bank of Malaysia

Yang Berbahagia Tan Sri Dato' Jaffar Hussein PSM SPMJ SIMP

4th Governor of the Central Bank of Malaysia
- In office June 1985 – May 1994
- Preceded by: Abdul Aziz Taha
- Succeeded by: Ahmad Mohd Don

Personal details
- Born: 11 June 1931 Parit Jawa, Muar, Johor, British Malaya (now Malaysia)
- Died: 11 August 1998 (aged 67) Subang Jaya, Selangor, Malaysia
- Resting place: Bukit Kiara Muslim Cemetery, Kuala Lumpur
- Spouse: Rohila Abdul Rahman
- Relations: Nur Jazlan Mohamed (son-in-law)
- Children: 3
- Education: University of Queensland

Jaffar bin Hussein (11 June 1931 – 11 August 1998) was a Malaysian banker and economist who served as the 4th Governor of the Central Bank of Malaysia from 1985 to 1994.

== Background ==
Jaffar graduated with a commerce degree from the University of Queensland in 1958. He served as chairman and chief executive of Malayan Banking Berhad prior to his appointment as Bank Negara Governor.

== Death ==
Jaffar died of pneumonia at the Subang Jaya Medical Centre on 11 August 1998, aged 67. He was buried at the Bukit Kiara Muslim Cemetery in Kuala Lumpur.

== Honours ==
=== Honours of Malaysia ===
- Malaysia :
  - Companion of the Order of Loyalty to the Crown of Malaysia (JSM) (1974)
  - Commander of the Order of Loyalty to the Crown of Malaysia (PSM) – Tan Sri (1987)
- Johor :
  - Knight Commander of the Order of the Crown of Johor (DPMJ) – Dato' (1980)
  - Knight Grand Commander of the Order of the Crown of Johor (SPMJ) – Dato' (1986)
- Pahang :
  - Grand Knight of the Order of the Crown of Pahang (SIMP) – Dato', later Dato' Indera (1990)
