= Ali Abul Hassan Sulaiman =

6th Governor of the Central Bank of Malaysia

Yang Berbahagia Tan Sri Dato’ Seri Ali Abul Hassan Sulaiman PSM SSAP SSMT DGSM DSPN DGPN DJN JSM AMN

6th Governor of the Central Bank of Malaysia
- In office September 1998 – 1 May 2000
- Preceded by: Ahmad Mohd Don
- Succeeded by: Zeti Akhtar Aziz

Personal details
- Born: 3 April 1941 Penang, Straits Settlements, British Empire (now present-day Malaysia)
- Died: 25 March 2013 (aged 71) Kemensah Heights, Kuala Lumpur, Malaysia
- Resting place: Bukit Kiara Muslim Cemetery

Tan Sri Dato’ Seri Ali Abul bin Hassan Sulaiman (3 April 1941 – 25 March 2013) is a former governor of the Central Bank of Malaysia.

== Death ==
He died on 25 March 2013 at the age of 71 due to complications of heart and prostate cancer.

== Honours ==
- Malaysia :
  - Member of the Order of the Defender of the Realm (AMN) (1974)
  - Companion of the Order of Loyalty to the Crown of Malaysia (JSM) (1988)
  - Commander of the Order of Loyalty to the Crown of Malaysia (PSM) – Tan Sri (1993)
- Penang :
  - Member of the Order of the Defender of State (DJN) (1988)
  - Officer of the Order of the Defender of State (DSPN) – Dato' (1991)
  - Commander of the Order of the Defender of State (DGPN) – Dato' Seri (1996)
- Terengganu :
  - Member Grand Companion of the Order of Sultan Mahmud I of Terengganu (SSMT) – Dato' Seri (1995)
- Malacca :
  - Grand Commander of the Exalted Order of Malacca (DGSM) – Datuk Seri (1996)
- Pahang :
  - Grand Knight of the Order of Sultan Ahmad Shah of Pahang (SSAP) – Dato' Sri (2002)
