= Nor Shamsiah Mohd Yunus =

9th Governor of Bank Negara Malaysia

Yang Berbahagia Tan Sri Datuk Nor Shamsiah Mohd Yunus PSM PMW

9th Governor of the Central Bank of Malaysia
- In office 1 July 2018 – 30 June 2023
- Monarchs: Muhammad V Abdullah
- Deputy: Shaik Abdul Rasheed Abdul Ghaffour; Jessica Chew Cheng Lian; Marzunisham Omar
- Minister of Finance: Lim Guan Eng; Tengku Zafrul Aziz; Anwar Ibrahim
- Preceded by: Muhammad Ibrahim
- Succeeded by: Abdul Rasheed Abdul Ghaffour

Personal details
- Born: Nor Shamsiah binti Mohd Yunus; 1964 (age 61–62) Federation of Malaysia
- Children: Robert H and Peter G
- Education: University of South Australia (1983–1985)

Nor Shamsiah binti Mohd Yunus (born 1964) was the 9th Governor of the Central Bank of Malaysia from 2018 to 2023, replacing Tan Sri Muhammad bin Ibrahim. She served as Deputy Governor of Bank Negara from 2010 to 2013 and from 2013 to 2016. Later, she joined the International Monetary Fund as Assistant Director of the Financial and Capital Markets Division.

She is the second woman to be appointed Governor of the National Bank after Tan Sri Dr Zeti Akhtar Aziz.

== Education ==
She holds a Bachelor of Arts degree in Accounting from the University of South Australia and is a Certified Practicing Accountant (CPA).

== Career ==
=== Bank Negara Malaysia ===
She has been in working at Bank Negara Malaysia since 1987. In 1999, she was appointed Director of the Bank's Regulation Department until 2004. On 1 December 2004 she was appointed Assistant Governor of Bank Negara Malaysia. She has served as the Deputy Governor of the Central Bank twice, namely in 2010–2013 and 2013–2016. She was finally appointed Governor of Bank Negara Malaysia from 1 July 2018.

=== Assignment at Bank Negara Malaysia ===
She has been in charge of financial development, strategic human resource management, organizational development transformation, prudent regulatory formation, bank regulatory and regulatory rules, crisis management and insurance.

=== Other career experience ===
- Assistant Director of the Finance and Capital Markets Division, the International Monetary Fund (IMF).
- Managing Director, Danamodal Nasional Berhad
- EPF Investment Panel Member
- Tabung Haji Investment Board member

== Contributions ==
She was directly involved in the settlement of the 1998 Asian Financial Crisis, playing an important role also in the formulation of the Financial Sector Masterplan (2001–2010) and the Financial Sector Roadmap (2011–2020).

== Honours ==
=== Honours of Malaysia ===
- Malaysia
  - Commander of the Order of Loyalty to the Crown of Malaysia (PSM) – Tan Sri (2020)
- Federal Territory (Malaysia)
  - Commander of the Order of the Territorial Crown (PMW) – Datuk (2012)

== See also ==
- Governor of the Central Bank of Malaysia
