= Siti Rahmah Kassim =

Malaysian politician

- Born: Siti Rahmah Kassim; November 30, 1926; Rembau, Negeri Sembilan, British Malaya
- Died: March 24, 2017 (aged 90); Kelana Jaya, Petaling Jaya, Selangor, Malaysia
- Citizenship: Malaysia
- Education: Sekolah Perempuan Melayu Sungai Star, Parit Buntar, Perak
- Occupation: Politician
- Political party: UMNO
- Spouse: Mohammad Majzub bin Haji Yunus
- Children: 5

Datuk Siti Rahmah Kassim (November 30, 1926 – March 24, 2017) was an independence fighter, best known for donating her golden bangle to Tunku Abdul Rahman, Malaysia's 1st Prime Minister, to pay for his flight to London to meet with Secretary of State for the Colonies Oliver Lyttelton and negotiate the independence of Malaya (which subsequently became Malaysia in 1963) from the United Kingdom.

== The Golden Bangle ==
In 1957 Tunku Abdul Rahman had called for an emergency UMNO meeting at Dewan Hang Tuah in Bandar Hilir, Malacca, where he lamented that the party did not have sufficient funds to send him and his delegates to Britain for independence negotiations, and asked for donations from the public. He had reportedly shed tears while saying so, which inspired Siti Rahmah to take off her golden bangle and donate it. She was the first person to do so.

She supposedly said, "This was a gift from my father for my wedding, but use it to aid in your fight for the country." She then walked around the hall asking the crowd to contribute to the fight for independence. "Those who are inside and outside this hall, please make donations to help Tunku Abdul Rahman Putra Al-Haj to go to London for the sake of the people and nation," she said. Inspired by her selflessness, men purportedly took off their rings, gold wristwatches and even the gold handles off their walking sticks, while women pledged earrings, brooches and dress pins.

She had said that her action was spurred by her love for the country, people and religion in an interview with Bernama in 2010.

== Politics ==
Siti Rahmah began her political career at the young age of 18 when she actively protested against the Malayan Union, and she became the first woman to contest in the 1959 general election. She held the Tementang seat in Rembau for two consecutive terms on the Alliance ticket until 1969. Even in her late 80s, Siti Rahmah was active in UMNO. In an interview with The Star, she had said, "Don't join UMNO today and hop to another party tomorrow just because someone says that party is better," referring to party hopping.

== Death ==
Siti died at 10:55 am on March 24, 2017 in Kelana Jaya, Petaling Jaya. Her body was brought to the Al-Hidayah Mosque for funeral prayers and buried at the Bukit Kiara Muslim cemetery.
