= W. H. Wilcock =

Governor of the Central Bank of Malaysia 1904–1999

Tan Sri William Howard Wilcock PMN (K)

1st Governor of the Central Bank of Malaysia
- In office 26 January 1959 – July 1962
- Preceded by: position established
- Succeeded by: Ismail Mohamed Ali

Personal details
- Born: 21 December 1904 Ballarat, Australia
- Died: 12 September 1999 (aged 94) Australia

Tan Sri William Howard Wilcock (21 December 1904 – 12 September 1999) was the first Governor of the Central Bank of Malaysia.

== Honours ==
- Malaya :
  - Honorary Commander of the Order of the Defender of the Realm (PMN (K)) - Tan Sri (1961)
