= Marshall Society =

Economics society at the University of Cambridge

The Marshall Society
- Established: 1927
- Location: Cambridge, UK

The Marshall Society is an economics society at the University of Cambridge. It was established in 1927, and is named after Alfred Marshall, the prominent economist who was Professor of Political Economy at Cambridge from 1885 to 1908 and established the university's economics Tripos in 1903. Notable former members of the society include economists such as John Maynard Keynes and Nicholas Kaldor, as well as political figures such as Manmohan Singh. At present, the society organises some events for members, including occasionally inviting speakers and hosting some social events.
