= Minister of Finance (Incorporated) =

Malaysian government body

Minister of Finance (Incorporated) (abbreviation: MoF (Inc.); Malay: Syarikat Milik Menteri Kewangan (Diperbadankan)) is a body corporate under the name of the Minister of Finance of Malaysia.

Established under the Minister of Finance (Incorporation) Act 1957, the Act provides the authority for MoF (Inc.) to enter into contracts, acquisitions, purchases, possessions, holdings and maintains tangible and intangible assets.

== See also ==
- 1Malaysia Development Berhad
- 1Malaysia Development Berhad scandal
