= Governor of the Central Bank of Malaysia =

Chief executive of Malaysia's central bank

- Incumbent; Shaik Abdul Rasheed Abdul Ghaffour since 1 July 2023
- Central Bank of Malaysia
- Style: Yang Berbahagia
- Seat: Jalan Dato' Onn, 50480 Kuala Lumpur
- Appointer: Yang di-Pertuan Agong on the recommendation of the Prime Minister of Malaysia
- Term length: 5 years
- Constituting instrument: Central Bank of Malaysia Act 2009
- Formation: January 1959
- First holder: W. H. Wilcock
- Deputy: Shaik Abdul Rasheed Abdul Ghaffour; Chew Cheng Lian
- Website: www.bnm.gov.my

The Governor of the Central Bank of Malaysia is the chief executive of Malaysia's central bank and the ex-officio chairperson of its Central Board of Directors. Malaysian ringgit currency notes, issued by the Central Bank of Malaysia (BNM), bear the governor's signature. Since its establishment in 1959, the BNM has been headed by 10 governors.

Section 15 (1) of the Central Bank of Malaysia Act 2009 states that the Governor is appointed by Yang di-Pertuan Agong, the Supreme Head of Malaysia whilst the Deputy Governor is appointed by the Finance Minister. Section 15 (4) of the Central Bank of Malaysia Act 2009 states that the term of office typically runs for 5 years for the Governor and 3 years for the Deputy Governor, both eligible for reappointment.

The 10th and current Governor is Shaik Abdul Rasheed Abdul Ghaffour, who took over from Nor Shamsiah Mohd Yunus on 1 July 2023.

== List of the governors ==
No.	Governor	Term of office			Minister of Finance	IMF Managing Director	WBG President
No.	Governor	Term start	Term end	Time in office	Minister of Finance	IMF Managing Director	WBG President
1	Tan Sri; W. H. Wilcock (1904–1999)	26 January 1959	July 1962	3 years	Henry Lee Hau-shik; Tan Siew Sin	Per Jacobsson	Eugene R. Black, Sr.
2	Tun; Ismail Mohamed Ali (1918–1998)	July 1962	July 1980	18 years	Tan Siew Sin; Abdul Razak Hussein; Hussein Onn; Tengku Razaleigh Hamzah	Per Jacobsson; Pierre-Paul Schweitzer; Johan Witteveen; Jacques de Larosière	Eugene R. Black, Sr. George D. Woods; Robert McNamara
3	Tan Sri; Abdul Aziz Taha (b.1936)	July 1980	June 1985	5 years	Tengku Razaleigh Hamzah; Daim Zainuddin	Jacques de Larosière	Robert McNamara; Alden W. Clausen
4	Tan Sri Dato'; Jaffar Hussein (1931–1998)	June 1985	May 1994	9 years	Daim Zainuddin; Anwar Ibrahim	Jacques de Larosière; Michel Camdessus	Alden W. Clausen; Barber Conable; Lewis T. Preston
5	Tan Sri Dato'; Ahmad Mohd Don (1947–2024)	May 1994	August 1998	4 years	Anwar Ibrahim	Michel Camdessus	Lewis T. Preston; James Wolfensohn
6	Tan Sri Dato' Seri; Ali Abul Hassan Sulaiman (1941–2013)	September 1998	1 April 2000	2 years	Anwar Ibrahim; Mahathir Mohamad; Daim Zainuddin	Michel Camdessus	James Wolfensohn
7	Tan Sri Dato' Sri Dr. Zeti Akhtar Aziz (b.1947)	1 May 2000	28 April 2016	15 years, 364 days	Daim Zainuddin; Mahathir Mohamad; Abdullah Ahmad Badawi; Mohd. Najib Abdul Razak	Horst Köhler; Rodrigo Rato; Dominique Strauss-Kahn; Christine Lagarde	James Wolfensohn; Paul Wolfowitz; Robert Zoellick; Jim Yong Kim
8	Tan Sri; Muhammad Ibrahim (b.1955)	1 May 2016	30 June 2018	2 years, 61 days	Mohd. Najib Abdul Razak; Lim Guan Eng	Christine Lagarde	Jim Yong Kim
9	Tan Sri; Nor Shamsiah Mohd Yunus (b.1964)	1 July 2018	30 June 2023	5 years, 0 days	Lim Guan Eng; Tengku Zafrul Aziz; Anwar Ibrahim	Christine Lagarde; Kristalina Georgieva	Jim Yong Kim; David Malpass
10	Dato' Seri; Shaik Abdul Rasheed Abdul Ghaffour (b.1964)	1 July 2023	Incumbent	3 years, 98 days	Anwar Ibrahim	Kristalina Georgieva	David Malpass; Ajay Banga
