= Zeti Akhtar Aziz =

Malaysian economist (born 1947)

Yang Mulia Tan Sri Dato' Sri Zeti Akhtar Aziz DK II (Johor) PSM SSAP SUMW DPMJ
- زيتي اختر عزيز
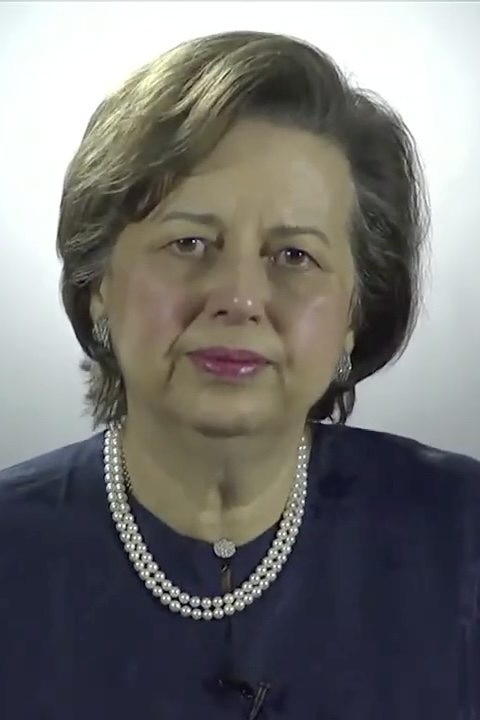
- Zeti speaking at the Leadership Energy Summit Asia 2014

7th Governor of the Central Bank of Malaysia
- In office 1 May 2000 – 30 April 2016
- Preceded by: Ali Abul Hassan Sulaiman
- Succeeded by: Muhammad bin Ibrahim

Group Chairman of Permodalan Nasional Berhad
- In office 1 July 2018 – 30 April 2021
- Preceded by: Abdul Wahid Omar
- Succeeded by: Arifin Zakaria

Chairman of Sime Darby Property
- In office 23 July 2018 – 6 May 2021
- Preceded by: Abdul Wahid Omar
- Succeeded by: Rizal Rickman Ramli

Personal details
- Born: Ungku Zeti Akhtar binti Ungku Abdul Aziz; 27 August 1947 (age 78) Johor Bahru, Johor, Malayan Union (present day Malaysia)
- Relations: Temenggong
- Parent(s): Ungku Abdul Aziz (father); Azah Aziz (mother)
- Education: University of Malaya; University of Pennsylvania (PhD)
- Profession: Economist
- Zeti Akhtar Aziz's voice Zeti speaking about leadership Recorded 4 November 2014

Ungku Zeti Akhtar binti Ungku Abdul Aziz (born 27 August 1947) is a Malaysian economist who served as the seventh governor of the Central Bank of Malaysia from 2000 to 2016, becoming the first woman to hold the position.

Zeti was born in Johor Bahru on 26 August 1947 to Ungku Abdul Aziz and Azah Aziz, studied economics at the University of Malaya (UM) before completing a Master's and PhD in monetary economics and international trade and finance at the Wharton School, University of Pennsylvania. She began her career in 1979 as a research economist at the South East Asian Central Banks Research and Training Centre before joining the Central Bank of Malaysia in 1985, where she later rose to become the institution's seventh governor and the first woman to hold the post in 2000.

During her 16-year tenure, she oversaw key initiatives in Islamic finance, financial sector reforms, and regional cooperation, including chairing committees at the Bank for International Settlements and contributing to the establishment of the Islamic Financial Services Board, the International Islamic Liquidity Management Corporation, and the Asia School of Business. She stepped down in April 2016 as the second longest-serving governor in the bank's history. Afterward, she was appointed to the Council of Eminent Persons in 2018 and later became group chairman of Permodalan Nasional Berhad and chairman of Sime Darby Property until her retirement in 2021. In the years following, she was linked to investigations surrounding 1MDB but denied allegations of wrongdoing and continued to provide testimony in related court proceedings through 2023. She has received multiple international honours for her leadership, including lifetime achievement awards and The Royal Award for Islamic Finance.

== Early life and education ==
Ungku Zeti Akhtar (Note: Ungku is a hereditary royal title in Johor.) was born in Johor Bahru on 26 August 1947. Her father, Ungku Abdul Aziz, was an academic and social critic, and her mother, Azah Aziz, was a journalist and cultural historian. Zeti has called her parents a "tremendous inspiration" and "highly controversial for their ideas and opinions" at particular points in life.

After completing her early education at Assunta High School in Petaling Jaya in 1958, she continued her sixth form study at St. John's Institution in Kuala Lumpur. She graduated with a Bachelor of Arts in economics from UM in 1970. She then continued her education in the United States, where she earned a Master of Arts and Doctor of Philosophy in monetary economics and international trade from Wharton School of the University of Pennsylvania.

== Career ==
=== Early career ===
Zeti returned to Kuala Lumpur in 1979 and began her career as a research economist at the South East Asian Central Banks Research and Training Centre, where she worked until 1984. During this time, she contributed to studies on interest rates and monetary aggregates and prepared the annual Economic Survey on SEACEN Countries, while also participating in the centre's training courses, seminars, and meetings. In 1985, after completing two volumes on regional interest rate reform and gaining recognition from the Malaysian Central Bank governor Ismail Mohamed Ali, she became deputy manager in the economics section of the central bank.

=== Assistant governor of the Central Bank of Malaysia ===
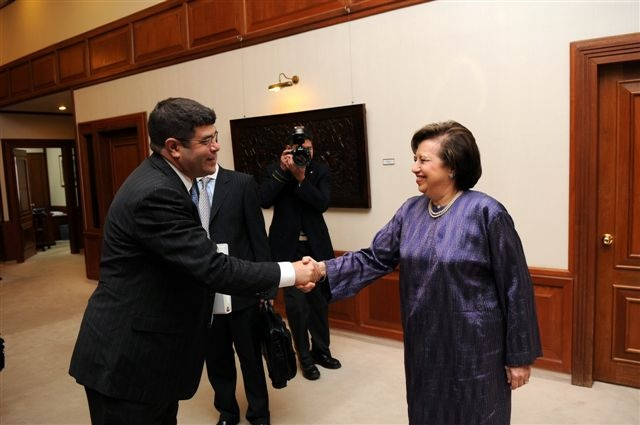
Deputy Secretary Neal S. Wolin (left) with Zeti (right), Kuala Lumpur, 2011

In 1995, Zeti was appointed assistant governor of Central Bank of Malaysia. During the Asian financial crisis in 1998, she formulated and implemented capital control measures to stabilise the Malaysian ringgit. Under her direction, the central bank fixed the ringgit at 3.80 per US dollar, prohibited offshore trading, and restricted capital outflows to curb speculation. These policies were intended to restore monetary stability and protect Malaysia's economy from external shocks. Zeti explained that the controls were necessary to "minimise the impact of a possible economic crisis and a breakdown in the international financial system." Economists such as Paul Krugman supported the use of such controls to stabilise economies during financial turmoil, while Ethan Kaplan and Dani Rodrik later argued that Malaysia's recovery under these measures was stronger than that of countries that adopted the International Monetary Fund's (IMF) conventional policies.

=== Governor of the Central Bank of Malaysia ===
Following the resignation of Ahmad Mohd Don, she was appointed acting governor on 31 August 1998 while concurrently serving as assistant governor alongside Ali Abul Hassan Sulaiman. She was confirmed as the seventh governor of the Malaysian central bank on 1 May 2000, becoming the institution's first female head. In 2001, she joined the Bank for International Settlements (BIS) Central Bank Governance Group, and her term as governor was extended for a further five years in 2006.

During her tenure, Zeti oversaw the gradual lifting of capital controls introduced during the Asian financial crisis and, on 21 July 2005, removed the ringgit's peg to the US dollar. Under her leadership, Malaysia transitioned to a flexible exchange rate regime to enable more efficient adjustment to global and financial developments. The change was implemented after establishing the necessary preconditions for a stable and functional foreign exchange market and formed part of a wider financial sector strategy that sought to strengthen the domestic bond market and reduce the economy's dependence on the banking system.

Zeti also contributed to the development of Malaysia's financial and educational institutions. She helped establish the International Centre for Leadership in Finance in 2003 and later founded the Asia School of Business in collaboration with the MIT Sloan School of Management in 2015. Internationally, she held several leadership roles, including chair of the East Asia-Pacific Central Banks task force, co-chair of the Financial Stability Board's Regional Consultative Group for Asia, and chair of the Bank for International Settlements (BIS) Asian Consultative Council (ACC) from October 2008 to September 2010, succeeding Y. V. Reddy and later succeeded by Masaaki Shirakawa. In 2009, she served as a member of the United Nations Task Force on Financial System Reforms. Zeti also advanced the field of Islamic finance by leading Malaysia's first sovereign sukuk issuance, chairing the committee that established the Islamic Financial Services Board, and contributing to the creation of the International Islamic Liquidity Management Corporation and the International Centre for Education in Islamic Finance.

In May 2011, Zeti was identified as a potential nominee to head the IMF following the departure of Dominique Strauss-Kahn. She later delivered the Per Jacobsson Lecture at the BIS in Basel in March 2014, addressing financial crisis management and the role of central banks in maintaining economic stability. In June 2015, she highlighted the importance of central banks in monitoring liquidity and solvency, implementing macroprudential regulations, and coordinating policy responses, while stressing the need for transparency and institutional checks to prevent misuse of authority.

Later in 2015, Zeti managed a period of currency pressure in Malaysia linked to political and economic uncertainties, including the 1MDB scandal, which contributed to the depreciation of the ringgit due to capital outflows and weak investor confidence. In response, the central bank revoked permissions for 1MDB's overseas investments and maintained a managed float exchange rate system to safeguard financial stability and market integrity. Zeti emphasised that, despite political tensions, the central bank’s policies would continue to support growth, control inflation, and ensure orderly financial markets. She concluded her sixteen-year tenure as governor with her final interest rate announcement in March 2016 and officially retired on 30 April 2016, succeeded by Muhammad Ibrahim, becoming the second longest-serving governor in the history of the Central Bank of Malaysia.

=== Later appointments ===
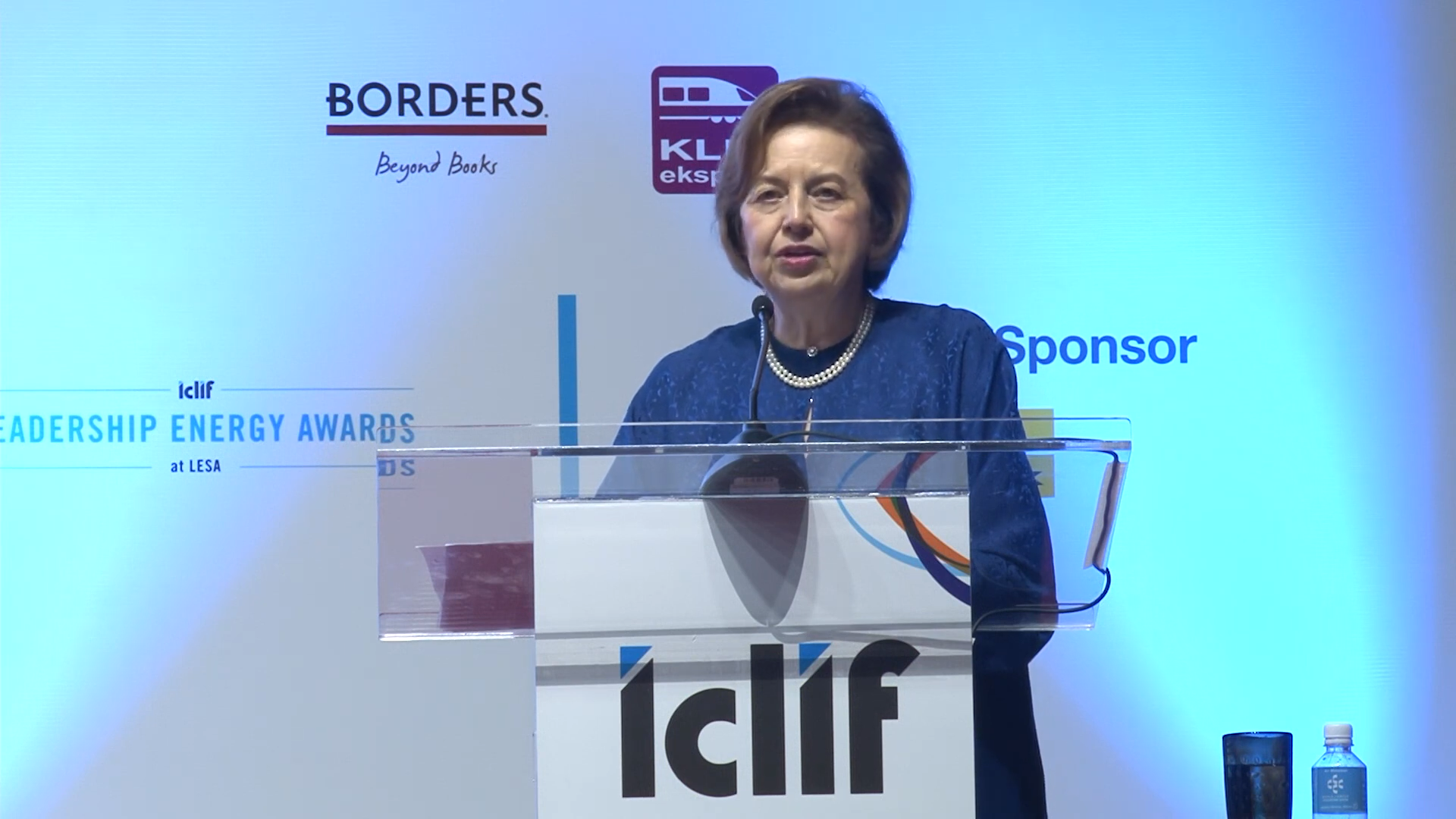
Zeti at the 2018 Leadership Energy Summit Asia

On 12 May 2018, shortly after the general election, Prime Minister Mahathir Mohamad appointed Zeti as a member of the Council of Eminent Persons to advise the government on economic and financial matters during the 100-day transition period. She was appointed group chairman of Permodalan Nasional Berhad (PNB) on 1 July, succeeding Abdul Wahid Omar, and also became Chairman of Sime Darby Property, the first woman to hold that position on 23 July.

On 16 January 2020, Zeti, as PNB group chairman, announced a new senior management team of 16 personnel, including appointments to key roles such as deputy president, chief investment officer, and group head of the newly established Treasury division. Later that year, on 31 December, Zeti publicly denied allegations that she or her family received money from 1MDB, describing the claims as "false and malicious," and stated that she had fully cooperated with investigations by the Central Bank of Malaysia, the police, and the Malaysian Anti-Corruption Commission. She noted that she could not comment further due to her status as a potential witness in Najib Razak's ongoing criminal trial.

On 12 April 2021, it was announced that Zeti would retire as Chairman of Sime Darby Property after the company's 48th annual general meeting on 6 May 2021. Later that year, on 29 April, PNB announced that Group Chairman Zeti would retire at the end of her three-year term on 30 April 2021. On 8 December 2022, the Malaysian Court of Appeal dismissed Najib's appeal to obtain banking documents related to Zeti's family for his 1MDB corruption trial, ruling that the documents were not relevant to his defence. On 16 August 2023, Zeti testified at the High Court that 1MDB had admitted there were no monies or investments after the central bank imposed a RM15 million fine on the company.

== Personal life ==
Zeti is descended from Roquaiya Hanim through both her paternal and maternal lines. Roquaiya's children with Ungku Abdul Majid included Ungku Abdul Aziz, the sixth Menteri Besar of Johor, and Ungku Abdul Hamid. The latter's son, Ungku Abdul Aziz, became vice-chancellor of UM and was Zeti's father. On her mother's side, Azah Aziz was the daughter of Azizah, another child of Roquaiya. Her father, Ungku Abdul Aziz, was of Malay–Turkish and English descent, while her mother, Azah Aziz, belonged to the Alsagoff family of Hadhrami origin. Zeti is married to Tawfiq Ayman, chairman of the Asian Institute of Finance, and they have two children.

== Awards, honours and recognitions ==
Under her leadership as governor of Malaysia's central bank, Zeti received wide recognition. In 2003, she was named Asia's best central bank governor in a poll of regional investors and bankers by Euromoney. The following year, The Banker named her Central Banker of the Year for her role in developing Malaysia's Islamic finance sector and guiding the country's economy toward stable growth. In 2009, Global Finance listed her among the world's best central bank chiefs, and in 2010 she was awarded the title Tokoh Ma'al Hijrah 1432H by the Malaysian government. In 2011, Pesek included her among his top four nominees to head the IMF. Subsequent honours included the Islamic Development Bank's Islamic Banking and Finance Award in 2012; a "Grade A" ranking from Global Finance for the tenth time in 2013; the Wharton Dean's Medal in March 2015; a lifetime achievement award from Mohammed bin Rashid Al Maktoum in 2015; and Central Banking's Lifetime Achievement Award in 2016. In October 2018, she received The Royal Award for Islamic Finance, and later that year the William "Bill" Seidman Award for Lifetime Achievement in Leadership in the Financial Services Industry.

=== Honours of Malaysia ===
- Malaysia
  - Commander of the Order of Loyalty to the Crown of Malaysia (PSM) – Tan Sri (2001)
- Federal Territory (Malaysia)
  - Grand Knight of the Order of the Territorial Crown (SUMW) – Datuk Seri Utama (2009)
- Johor
  - Second Class of the Royal Family Order of Johor (DK II) (2000)
  - Knight Commander of the Order of the Crown of Johor (DPMJ) – Datin Paduka (1998)
- Pahang
  - Grand Knight of the Order of Sultan Ahmad Shah of Pahang (SSAP) – Dato' Sri (2002)

=== Foreign honour ===
- Japan
  - Gold and Silver Star of the Order of the Rising Sun (2017)
