= INCEIF University =

- Universiti INCEIF
- Type: Private
- Established: March 2006
- Chancellor: Tan Sri Nor Shamsiah Mohd Yunus
- President: Mohd Azmi Omar
- Dean: Mansor H. Ibrahim
- Pro Chancellor: Mohd Daud Bakar
- Location: Jalan Tun Ismail 50480, Kuala Lumpur, Malaysia; 3°09′37″N 101°41′27″E
- Website: inceif.edu.my

The INCEIF University is a Malaysian Islamic university established in 2005 by Bank Negara Malaysia (Central Bank of Malaysia) in human capital for the Islamic finance industry. It was previously known as the Global University of Islamic Finance and International Center for Education in Islamic Finance (INCEIF).

In August 2007, the Ministry of Higher Education Malaysia granted INCEIF university status. In February 2009, Bank Negara Malaysia Governor Zeti Akhtar Aziz was officially proclaimed as the first Chancellor of INCEIF. The proclamations were made during the first convocation in 2009, marking the graduation of the first batch of graduates who completed the Chartered Islamic Finance Professional (CIFP) program.

== Partnerships ==
Partnerships of INCEIF as of January 2014:

=== Malaysia ===
- Universiti Tun Abdul Razak (UNIRAZAK)
- Universiti Sultan Zainal Abidin (UNISZA)
- BNP Paribas
- Prudential BSN Takaful Berhad
- OCBC Al-Amin
- Hay Group

=== International ===
- Islamic Financial Services Board
- Islamic Development Bank
- World Bank
- University of Reading (UK)
- University of East London (UK)
- Kuwait Finance Research Ltd (Kuwait)
- Capital Market Licensing & Training Agency (Turkey)
- Capital Market Board of Turkey (Turkey)
- Istanbul Sehir University (Turkey)
- University International of Rabat (Morocco)
- CESAG (Senegal)
- Kenya School of Monetary Studies (Kenya)
- College of Banking and Financial Studies (Oman)
