= Rafiah Salim =

Yang Berbahagia Tan Sri Rafiah Salim PSM PJN
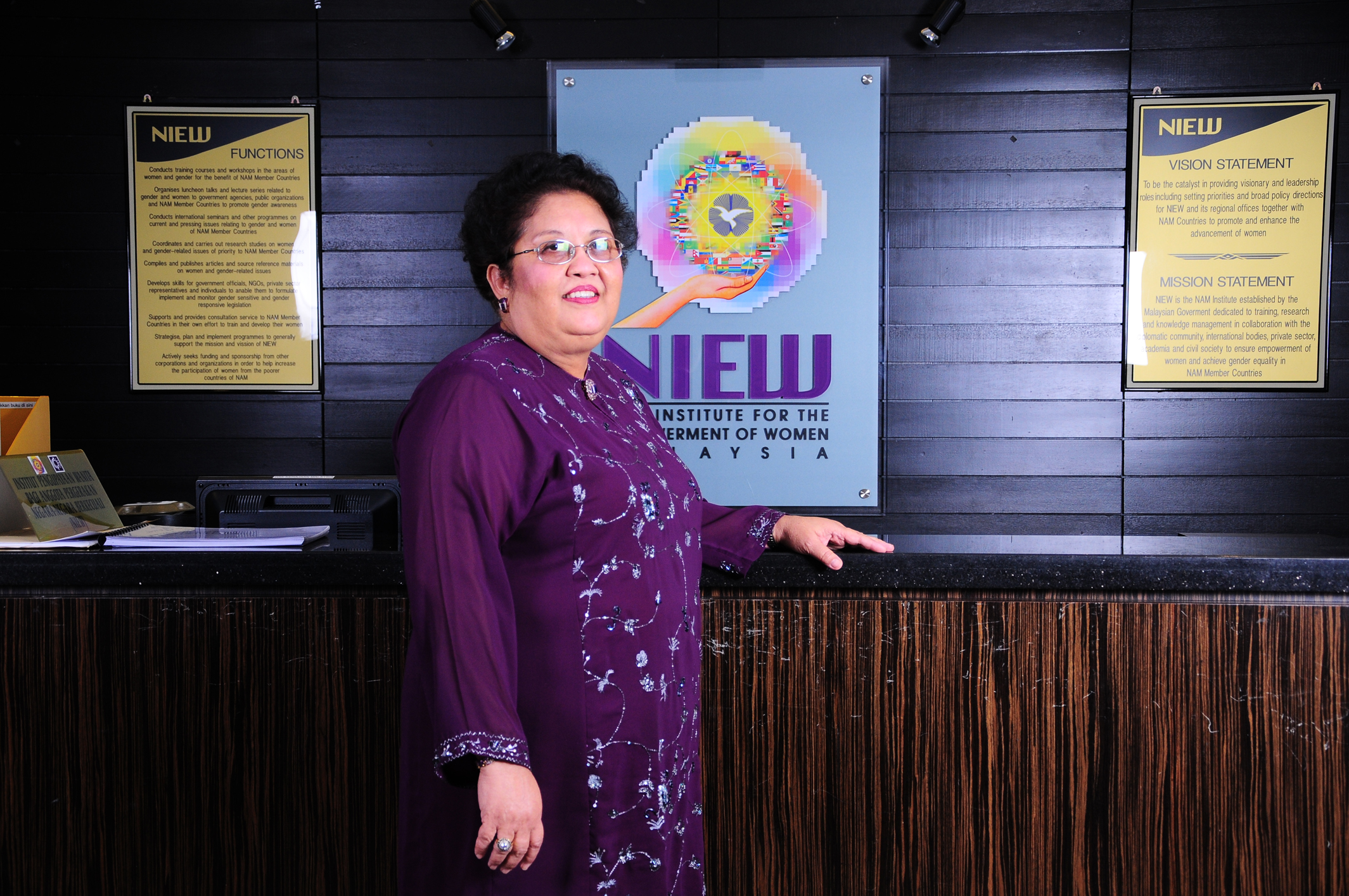

Vice-Chancellor of the Universiti Malaya
- In office 1 May 2006 – 2008

Personal details
- Born: Rafiah binti Salim Kuala Krai, Kelantan, Malaysia

Rafiah binti Salim was the first female Vice-Chancellor in Malaysia, serving in the role at the Universiti Malaya from 1 May 2006 to 2008.

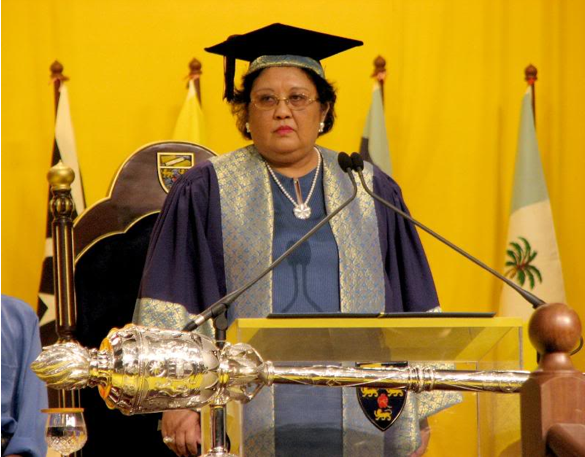
Salim was appointed the ninth Vice-Chancellor of the University of Malaya on 8 May 2006.

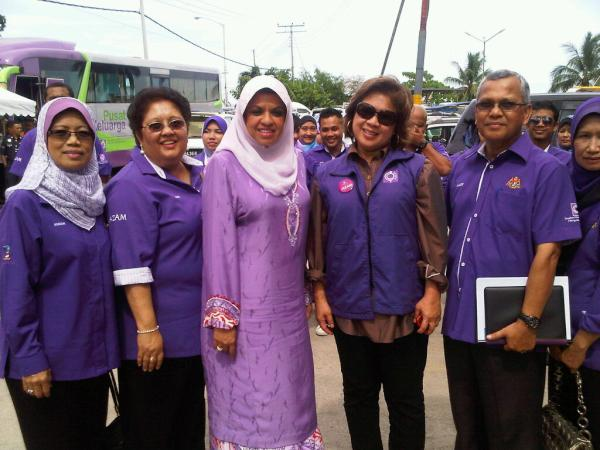
From Left:Aminah Abdul Rahman, Director General of Population and Family Development, Rafiah Salim, Shahrizat Abdul Jalil Minister of Women, Family and Community Development, Noorul Ainur Mohd, Secretary General of the Ministry of Women, Family and Community Development and Hadzir Mohd Zain, Director General, Department of Social Welfare.

Rafiah currently directs the NAM Institute for the Empowerment of Women (NIEW) - an agency under the Ministry of Women, Family and Community Development. She was the UN Assistant Secretary General for Human Resource Management at its headquarters in New York between 1997 and 2002.

In 2003, Rafiah was given the responsibility of setting up the International Centre for Leadership in Finance (ICLIF), and institution entrusted with the mandate of training corporate CEOs of the region.

From 1995 to 1997, Rafiah was an Assistant Governor with Bank Negara Malaysia, The Central Bank of Malaysia. Prior to this, she joined Malayan Banking Bhd., Malaysia's largest banking group, as Head of Legal Department in 1989, and was promoted to General Manager of Human Resource in 1991, a post which she held until 1995.

Rafiah's involvement with academia began in 1974 when she became a lecturer at the law faculty also at the University of Malaya. She was appointed the Deputy Dean of the Faculty of Law in 1986, and the following year, was appointed as the Dean of the faculty.

Rafiah has been active in publishing academic works and in presenting papers at both local and international platforms. In America and Canada, Rafiah has interalia, presented papers at conferences organised by the HR Association of Public Service, New Jersey, at the UN itself, at Princeton University, and at IPMA (International Personnel Management Association) Ottawa.

Rafiah obtained her Certificate in Legal Practice in 1980 and is an advocate and solicitor of the High Court of Malaya. Rafiah studied law at Queen's University of Belfast, from which she graduated with a Bachelor of Laws in 1971 and Master of Laws in 1974. In 2005 Rafiah was awarded an honorary doctorate by her alma mater.

Rafiah was the President of the Malayan Commercial Banks’ Association from 1991 to 1993, and was the Vice Chairman of the Malaysian Employers Federation in 1992. She is also a Non-Executive Director for Nestlé (Malaysia) Berhad, Malaysian Genomics Resource Centre Berhad (MGRC), Cerebos (Malaysia) Sdn Bhd and the National Entrepreneurship Board (PUNB)

On the official birthday of Di-Pertuan Agong, on 4 June 2011, Rafiah was awarded Darjah Kebesaran PANGLIMA SETIA MAHKOTA (P.S.M), carrying the title "TAN SRI".

== Honour ==
=== Honour of Malaysia ===
- Malaysia
  - Commander of the Order of Loyalty to the Crown of Malaysia (PSM) – Tan Sri (2011)
  - Commander of the Order of Meritorious Service (PJN) – Datuk (2004)
