= Markus Baer =

German psychologist

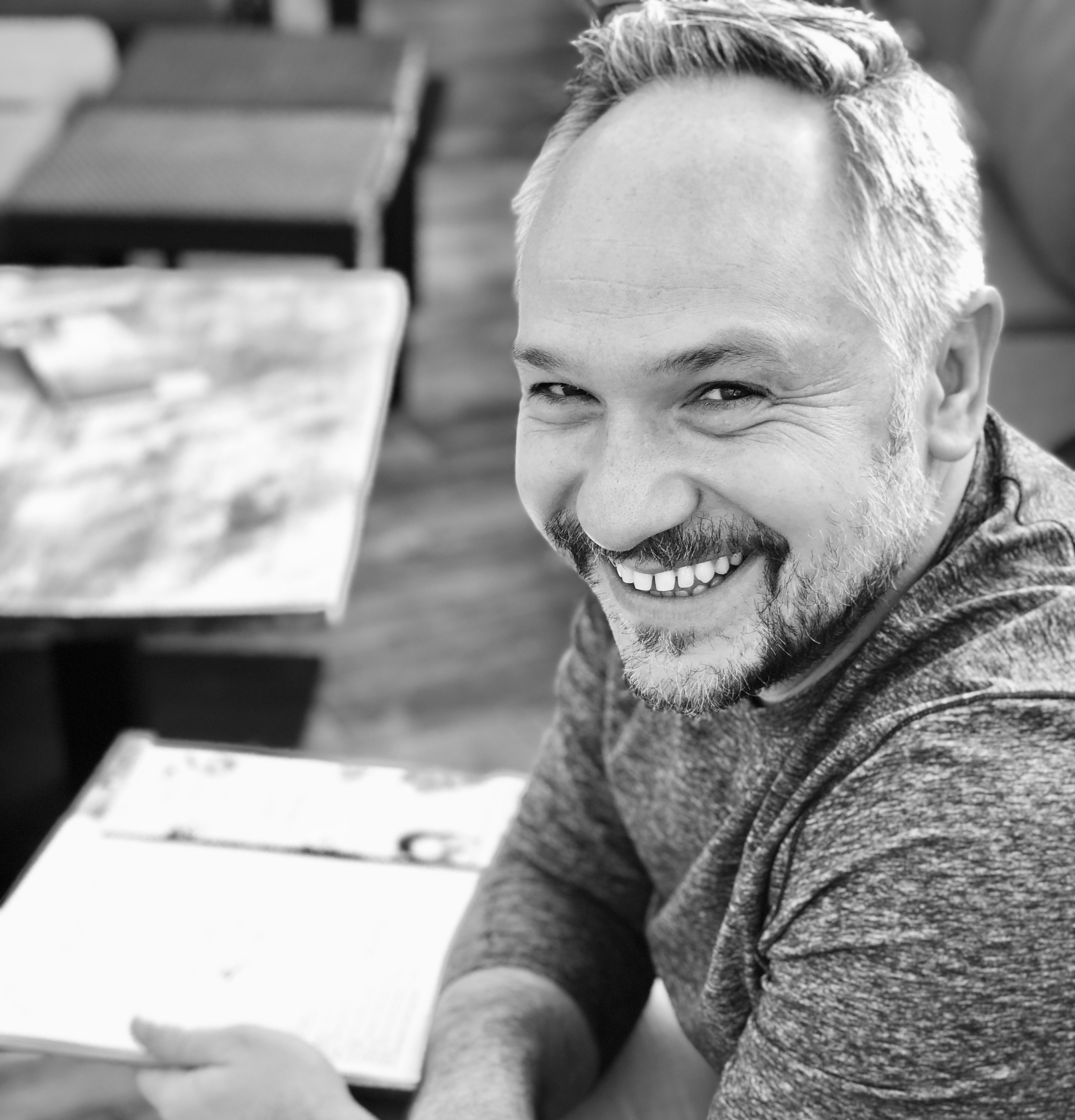
- Baer in 2018.
- Occupations: Organizational psychologist and academic

Academic background
- Education: M.A. in psychology Ph.D. in Organizational Behavior
- Alma mater: Justus Liebig University Giessen; University of Illinois at Urbana-Champaign

Academic work
- Institutions: Olin Business School, Washington University in St. Louis (WashU)
- Website: markusbaer.com

Markus Baer is a German-American organizational psychologist and academic. He is the Knight Family Professor and Vice Dean of Executive Education at the Olin Business School, Washington University in St. Louis (WashU). He is a research fellow at the Judge Business School, University of Cambridge. His research interests have focused on the process of innovation, including problem formulation, idea generation, idea selection, and implementation, with a specific emphasis on creativity and its critical social-contextual drivers.

== Early life and education ==
Baer was born in Dillenburg, Germany, to German-Romanian parents and holds German and American citizenship. He studied psychology at Justus Liebig University Giessen and the North Carolina State University in Raleigh, North Carolina. He completed his master's thesis under Michael Frese, graduating with a M.A. in psychology (Diplompsychologe) in 2000. He emigrated to the United States in 2000 and earned his Ph.D. in Organizational Behavior from the University of Illinois at Urbana-Champaign in 2007.

== Career ==
Baer was appointed assistant professor of organizational behavior at the Olin Business School in 2006, promoted to associate professor in 2014, became a full professor in 2020, and has been the Vice Dean of Executive Education since 2022. In 2026, he was appointed Knight Family Professor at Olin Business School. Since 2018, he has been a research fellow (Organisational Behavior) at the Judge Business School, University of Cambridge.

In 2011, Baer was rated as one of the world's best 40 business school professors under the age of 40 by Poets and Quants. He was an associate editor of the Academy of Management Journal from 2016 to 2019 and the Journal of Product Innovation Management from 2022 to 2024. He is an associate editor of the Strategic Entrepreneurship Journal.

Baer's work has received over 12,000 citations on Google Scholar.

== Research ==
Baer's research work has primarily focused on the activities that underlie creativity and innovation: problem formulation, idea generation, idea selection, and idea implementation.

Baer's research on problem formulation has argued that defining the problem is the most critical and perilous step in the innovation process. In his theoretical study published in the Strategic Management Journal, he identified that dominant relationships can lead the participants to formulate solutions before exploring alternatives, reducing their ability to collaborate and understand problems. He developed "Collaborative Structured Inquiry", a method to enhance the formulation of problems in strategy-setting teams. Later, he published his findings in Organization Science, demonstrating the importance of transitioning from concrete to abstract reasoning to generate more thorough causal explanations. He also highlighted the importance of flexibility and sequencing, rather than strictly favoring one mode of thought over another.

In the domain of idea generation, Baer's work has reframed creativity as a fragile outcome dependent on specific contextual factors, such as time pressure and support. His research in the Journal of Applied Psychology showed that weak ties are associated with creativity, emphasizing "individuals' openness to experience" as a critical catalyst.

Baer's work has also focused on distinguishing the generation of ideas from their realization, characterizing implementation as a distinct socio-political hurdle. In his study in the Academy of Management Journal, he presented the association between "creativity and implementation", underscoring the role of "employees' networking ability". He also suggested that sustaining strong network connections enables creators to get support for their ideas. At the organizational level, his work in the Journal of Organizational Behavior highlighted climate for initiative as critical for innovation and documented that climates for psychological safety and initiative are vital to increase the association between process innovativeness and firm performance.

== Selected articles ==
- Baer, Markus; Frese, Michael (2003). "Innovation is not enough: Climates for initiative and psychological safety, process innovations, and firm performance". Journal of Organizational Behavior. 24 (1): 45–68. doi:10.1002/job.179.
- van Dyck, Cathy; Frese, Michael; Baer, Markus; Sonnentag, Sabine (2005). "Organizational error management culture and its impact on performance: A two-study replication". Journal of Applied Psychology. 90 (6): 1228–1240. doi:10.1037/0021-9010.90.6.1228.
- Baer, Markus; Oldham, Greg R. (2006). "The curvilinear relation between experienced creative time pressure and creativity: Moderating effects of openness to experience and support for creativity". Journal of Applied Psychology. 91 (4): 963–970. doi:10.1037/0021-9010.91.4.963.
- Baer, Markus (2010). "The strength-of-weak-ties perspective on creativity: A comprehensive examination and extension". Journal of Applied Psychology. 95 (3): 592–601. doi:10.1037/a0018761.
- Baer, Markus (2012). "Putting creativity to work: The implementation of creative ideas in organizations". Academy of Management Journal. 55 (5): 1102–1119. doi:10.5465/amj.2009.0470.
