= Sime Darby =

Malaysian trading conglomerate

Sime Darby Berhad
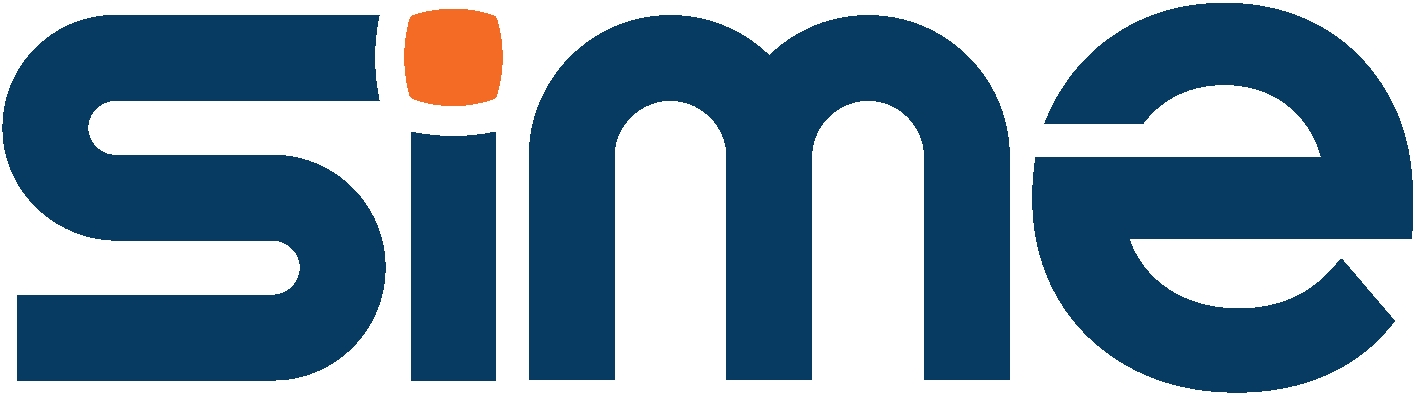
- Logo used since 15 November 2024
- Type: Publicly traded government-linked company (GLC) & state-owned enterprise (SOE)
- Traded as: MYX: 4197
- ISIN: MYL4197OO009
- Industry: Conglomerate
- Predecessor: Sime, Darby and Co. Guthrie; Golden Hope
- Founded: October 1910; 116 years ago
- Founder: William Sime; Henry Darby
- Headquarters: Ara Damansara, Malaysia
- Area served: Asia Pacific
- Key people: Samsudin Osman, Chairman; Jeffri Salim Davidson, Chief Executive Officer
- Products: Industrial equipment Automotive
- Revenue: ▲MYR 70.1 billion (FY2025)
- Operating income: ▲MYR 3.6 billion (FY2025)
- Net income: ▲MYR 2.4 billion (FY2025)
- Number of employees: 29,807 (2025)
- Parent: Permodalan Nasional Berhad
- Website: www.sime.com

Sime Darby Berhad, referred to as Sime, is a Malaysian trading conglomerate. Its core businesses operate and serve in the industrial equipment and automotive sectors.

== Background ==
The modern Sime Darby Berhad corporation was created in 2007 through a merger of three companies.

=== Sime, Darby and Co. Limited ===
In October 1910, British businessmen William Sime and Henry Darby established Sime, Darby and Co., a fledgling player in the lucrative rubber industry. The company later diversified to cultivating palm oil and cocoa and met with enormous success. At the time of the company's founding, William Middleton Sime was a 37-year-old Scottish adventurer and fortune seeker. He had two failed ventures behind him – one in import-export business and the other in coffee plantations – when he left his job as a mercantile assistant in Singapore. Henry Darby was a wealthy 50-year-old English banker who owned property in Northern Malaya.

A senior partner of the audit firm of the Sime Darby group was found dead in September 1973. In two suicide letters, he alleged he was doped and deceived by Dennis Pinder, chairman and managing director of Sime Darby, related to the audit of Sime Darby. Subsequently, Dennis Pinder was alleged that he misappropriated over S$3 million. At that time, Sime Darby was one of the largest companies in Singapore and Malaysia. Pinder was jailed after pleading guilty to criminal breach of trust in October 1975.

In 1977, Sime Darby Holdings was acquired by Malaysian investors – mainly through Tradewinds (Malaysia) Sdn Bhd. In December 1979 with the incorporation of two new Malaysian entities, Sime Darby Berhad (SDB) and Consolidated Plantations Berhad (CPB), Sime Darby moved its headquarters to Kuala Lumpur and became a Malaysian registered and managed concern.

=== Guthrie ===
The company was founded in Singapore in 1821 by Alexander Guthrie. It was the first British trading company in South East Asia. Guthrie introduced rubber and oil palm in Malaysia in 1896 and 1924 respectively. Guthrie Group was made a public company in 1987 and was subsequently listed on the Kuala Lumpur Stock Exchange (KLSE) in 1989 in what was then the largest public issue in Malaysia.

=== Golden Hope ===
In 1905, Harrisons and Crosfield, a British tea and coffee trading company, purchased several small estates in Malaysia for £50,000 and amalgamated them to form the Golden Hope Rubber Estate. In 1982 Harrisons and Crosfield sold three large plantation groups – Golden Hope, Pataling, and London Asiatic – to Malaysian concerns for £146 million. The business was renamed Golden Hope Plantations Berhad in 1990 after Pemodalan Nasional Berhad took majority equity of the company. Its interests originally were in tropical agriculture but, while plantations have remained a core business interest, the company has diversified into other areas including glycerine manufacture, fruit juices and real estate. The group now has 83 subsidiaries based in seven countries. The main estate and plantations are Carey Island and Banting in Selangor.

=== Merger ===
In January 2007, the "three Malaysian giants": Sime Darby, Guthrie and Golden Hope, merged into the vehicle entity named Synergy Drive and on 27 November 2007, Synergy Drive was renamed Sime Darby Berhad. Sime Darby had a land bank of 850,000 hectares in 2011. The Malaysian government-linked company Amanah Saham was the largest stakeholder in 2011, followed by the government's Employees Provident Fund and the government-run Permodalan Nasional Berhad (PNB, the national capitalization agency). CEO of the firm was Datuk Mohd Bakke Saleh, who was also the CEO of Bank Islam, another government-linked company, in 2010.

=== Listing of Sime Darby Plantation and Sime Darby Property ===
In November 2017, Sime Darby Berhad listed its subsidiaries, Sime Darby Plantation Berhad and Sime Darby Property Berhad on the Bursa Malaysia’s Main Market, creating three distinct pure-play companies. The demerger of the giant into separate “pure plays” aimed to unlock the value of the companies and provides the visibility on each firm’s performance. Jeffri Salim Davidson is the current group chief executive officer, Mustamir Muhamad is the chief financial officer and Datuk Thomas Leong Yew Hong is the group chief strategy officer. Permodalan Nasional Berhad has a 52% stake in Sime Darby Bhd. In May 2024, Sime Darby Plantation Berhad was rebranded to SD Guthrie Berhad.

=== Rebranding as Sime ===
On 15 November 2024, Sime Darby Berhad announced it will be rebranding as simply Sime, in an effort to reflect the Group's "renewed vision for the future and its renewed strategic focus as a pure-play powerhouse in the automotive and industrial equipment segments".

== Businesses ==
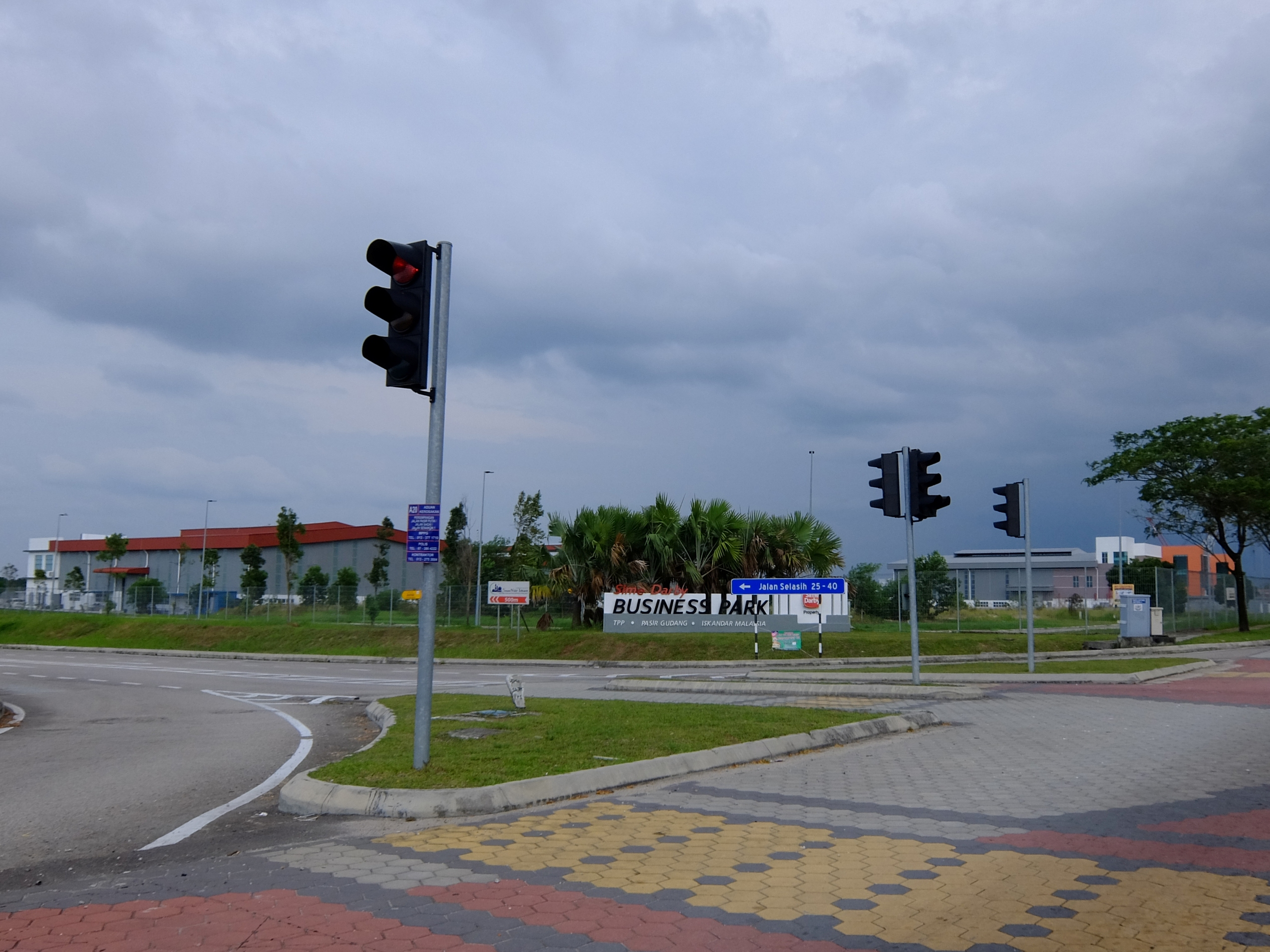
Sime Darby Business Park in Pasir Gudang, Johor.

=== Industrial and Motors divisions ===
Sime is an international conglomerate involved in many types of businesses. Its industrial and motor divisions are the main revenue generators of the business.

=== UMW division ===
In March 2024, Sime Darby acquired 100% of UMW Holdings Berhad's (UMW's) stake, making UMW a wholly owned subsidiary of Sime Darby Berhad and a third core division of the Group.

=== Healthcare ===
Ramsay Sime Darby Health Care Sdn Bhd (RSDH) is a 50:50 joint venture owned by Sime Darby and ASX-listed Ramsay Health Care.

In Malaysia, RSDH owns and operates three hospitals: Subang Jaya Medical Centre, Ara Damansara Medical Centre and ParkCity Medical Centre.

While in neighbouring Indonesia, the company owns and operates two hospitals in Jakarta: RS Premier Bintaro and RS Premier Jatinegara and another RS Premier Surabaya which is located in Surabaya, the capital of East Java.

In November 2023, Sime announced its exit from the Healthcare business by selling its entire 50 per cent equity interest in Ramsay Sime Darby Health Care Sdn Bhd (RSDH) to Columbia Asia Healthcare Sdn Bhd (Columbia Asia) for RM2.84 billion.

=== Other businesses ===
Sime Darby Global Services Centre has 510 employees and provides services such as human resource management, finance, procurement services and IT to operating units in the Sime Darby Group. Some of these services include the processing of account payables and receivables, book keeping services, human resource administration and payroll services, procurement services (sourcing and vendor registration), corporate card services as well as information technology services (such as server hosting). In May 2019, Sime Darby Berhad’s Global Services Centre was acquired by DXC Technology.

Sime Darby Lockton Insurance Brokers Sdn Bhd (26364-U) is an approved insurance broker under Financial Services Act 2013 and regulated by Bank Negara Malaysia. The company provides risk management, insurance and takaful solutions. Sime Darby Berhad has a 60% stake in Sime Darby Lockton Insurance Brokers Sdn Bhd, via its subsidiary, Sime Darby Allied Products Berhad. Lockton Overseas Limited owns the remaining 40% stake.

=== Eastern and Oriental stake ===
In August 2011, Sime Darby purchased a 30% stake in Penang-based property developer Eastern and Oriental Bhd (E&O) for RM766 million, or RM2.30 per share. It was made at a 60% premium to the market price then from three shareholders – E&O managing director Terry Tham, prominent businessman Wan Azmi Wan Hamzah and Singapore stockbroking group GK Goh Holdings Ltd.

In 2014, Sime Darby sold 110 million ordinary stock units of RM1 each in Eastern & Oriental Bhd (E&O) to Morning Crest Sdn Bhd for RM319 million or RM2.90 per stock. Upon completion of the sale, Sime Darby's equity stake in E&O reduced to about 22% (excluding treasury stocks).

In 2016, Sime Darby who then owned a 22.2% stake in E&O sold a 10% stake for RM323.3mil or RM2.45 per share to E&O group managing director Datuk Seri Terry Tham.

=== Tesco Malaysia stake ===
Until 2020, Sime Darby held a 30% stake in Tesco Malaysia (M) Sdn. Bhd., one of the largest food retailer chains in the country with over 60 locations in Malaysia.

In April 2020, it was announced that the company's stake would be divested for proceeds of RM300 million following the sale of the chain to Thailand-based Charoen Pokphand, which subsequently rebranded all Tesco Malaysia locations with the Lotus's name. The divestment, marking Sime Darby's exit from the hypermarket business, was part of its wider move to rationalise non-core assets.

== Corporate social responsibility ==
Yayasan Sime Darby is the philanthropic arm of Sime Darby. Sime Darby Bhd agreed to contribute RM 20 million annually to Yayasan Sime Darby (Sime Darby Foundation) for 5 years from November 2017.

== See also ==
- Sime Darby FC
