= Abdul Wahid Omar =

Malaysian banker and investor

Yang Berbahagia Tan Sri Dato' Seri Abdul Wahid Omar PSM SSNS SSIS SSAP DSAP FCCA
- عبدالواحد عمر
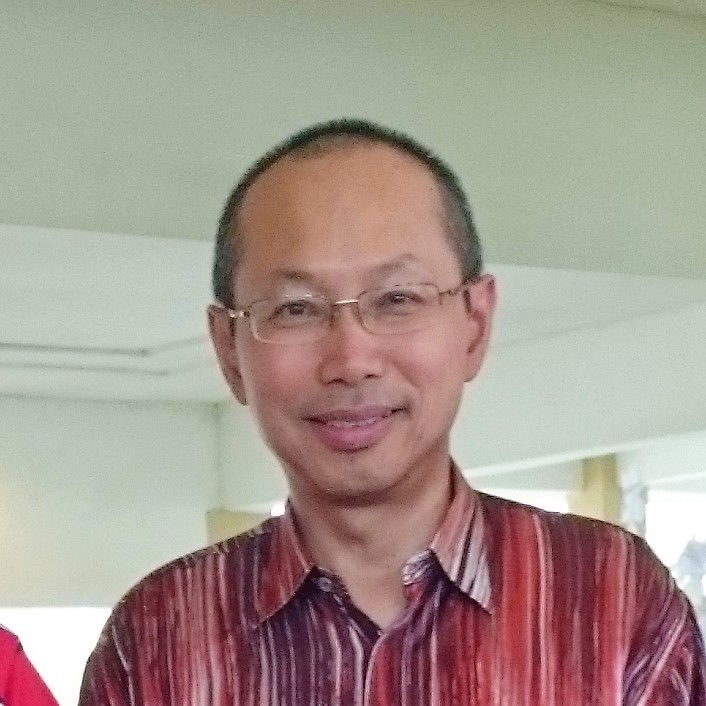

Chairman of the Bursa Malaysia
- Incumbent
- Assumed office 1 May 2020
- Minister: Tengku Zafrul Aziz (2020–2022); Anwar Ibrahim (since 2022); Amir Hamzah Azizan (Minister II, since 2023)
- Preceded by: Shireen Ann Zaharah Muhiudeen

Chairman of the Permodalan Nasional Berhad
- In office 1 August 2016 – 29 June 2018
- Preceded by: Ahmad Sarji Abdul Hamid
- Succeeded by: Zeti Akhtar Aziz

Minister in the Prime Minister's Department (Economic Planning Unit (EPU))
- In office 16 May 2013 – 4 June 2016
- Monarch: Abdul Halim
- Prime Minister: Najib Razak
- Deputy: Waytha Moorthy Ponnusamy (2013–2014); Devamany S. Krishnasamy (2016)
- Preceded by: Nor Mohamed Yakcop
- Succeeded by: Abdul Rahman Dahlan
- Constituency: Senator

Senator (Appointed by the Yang di-Pertuan Agong)
- In office 5 June 2013 – 4 June 2016
- Monarch: Abdul Halim
- Prime Minister: Najib Razak

Personal details
- Born: Abdul Wahid bin Omar; 1964 (age 61–62) Johor Bahru, Johor, Malaysia
- Citizenship: Malaysian
- Party: Independent
- Spouse: Kay Roserina Mohd Kassim
- Education: Malaysian Institute of Accounts (MIA); Institute of Chartered Accountants in England & Wales (ICAEW), UK
- Occupation: Banker; investor

Abdul Wahid bin Omar (Jawi: عبدالواحد بن عمر; born 1964) is a Malaysian banker and investor who has served as Chairman of the Bursa Malaysia since May 2020. He has also served as the chairman of the National University of Malaysia (UKM) since November 2018.

From 2008 to 2013, Abdul Wahid served as the President & CEO of Maybank: Malaysia's largest publicly listed company and one of the largest financial services groups in Southeast Asia. From June 2013 to June 2016, he was appointed as Senator and Minister in the Prime Minister's Department in charge of Economic Planning. From August 2016 to June 2018, he was the Group Chairman of the Permodalan Nasional Berhad (PNB), a Malaysian government-linked investment company, and one of the country's largest fund management companies.

During his career, he managed the restructuring and development of UEM Group, Telekom Malaysia, and Maybank.

== Background ==
Abdul Wahid was born in Johor Bahru, Johor, in 1964, and was the ninth child out of eleven siblings. He received his secondary education at MRSM Seremban from 1977 to 1981 before continuing his studies in the United Kingdom under Majlis Amanah Rakyat (MARA) scholarships.

Abdul Wahid led three major organizations in financial services, telecommunications and infrastructure development in his 28-year career. He also led Telekom Malaysia into a regional telecommunications group (prior to its demerger with Axiata in 2008) and oversaw the turnaround of the UEM Group, a Malaysian infrastructure conglomerate following its takeover by Khazanah Nasional in 2001.

Wahid is a fellow of the Association of Chartered Certified Accountants (ACCA), United Kingdom, a member of the Malaysian Institute of Accountants (MIA) and the Institute of Chartered Accountants in England & Wales (ICAEW).

== Careers ==
=== 1987–2001: Early years ===
Abdul Wahid started his career working at KPMG Peat Marwick in 1987. He subsequently worked at an investment bank, Bumiputra Merchant Bankers Berhad from 1989 to 1991, joining the Corporate Banking Department. He was then appointed Senior Vice President, Finance, Administration & Secretarial of Kumpulan Fima Berhad from 1991 to 1994. He subsequently became Director of Group Corporate Services Divisional Director, Capital Market & Securities of Amanah Capital Partners Berhad from 1994 to 2001. Abdul Wahid also served as Chairman of Amanah Short Deposits Berhad and the Association of Discount Houses in Malaysia as well as Director of Amanah Merchant Bank Berhad during this period.

=== 2001–2004: United Engineers (Malaysia) Berhad (UEM) & UEM World Berhad ===
Abdul Wahid joined Telekom Malaysia as a chief financial officer (CFO) on 1 March 2001 before he was appointed managing director cum chief executive officer (CEO) of UEM Group in October 2001. UEM Group (then UEM-Renong Berhad Group) was in the middle of debt restructuring plan when Abdul Wahid took over. It led to the takeover by Khazanah Nasional in 2001, which received mixed reactions by the public. As part of this restructuring plan, Abdul Wahid unlocked the value of its highway concessions led by PLUS Expressways, and subsequently the toll concession was reviewed. The rate of increase of the toll was reduced (from 5% pa to 3.2% pa), but was set to increase every 3 years. This allowed space for UEM's debts to be restructured and thereafter undertook its IPO listing on Bursa Malaysia in July 2002. Another step taken by Abdul Wahid was to dispose the non-core assets in order to reduce the Group's debt to a more manageable level.

After 2 1/2 years, the Group's debt was halved to a more sustainable level of RM16 billion with the bulk of it in the form of project financing. The UEM Group was back on profitable track with annual profit of RM500 million and revalued net assets of RM10 billion. Khazanah Nasional not only achieved its main objectives in the takeover but also doubled the value of its investments within 3 years.

=== 2004–2008: Telekom Malaysia Berhad (TM) ===
Abdul Wahid returned to Telekom Malaysia (TM) as CEO in July 2004 as part of the larger transformation plan of Government-linked companies (GLCs). He was tasked with expanding TM's regional presence, specifically within the mobile communications sector. His experience in turning around UEM Group and being the CFO of TM before had given him a very conducive environment to carry out the mandate.

He addressed the fundamentals of the business; organizationally, culturally, customer service wise and business wise. As a part of the efforts to enhance shareholder value, it was decided that the TM Group would be better off being demerged into two separate listed entities. TM International (now known as Axiata Group) with Celcom and other regional mobile communications business under its wings were successfully demerged and listed on Bursa Malaysia in April 2008.

This left TM being repositioned as the National High-Speed Broadband (HSBB) Champion spearheading the national HSBB deployment in Public Private Partnership with the Government of Malaysia. The demerger "unleashed" Axiata Group to grow further across Asia.

=== 2008–2013: Maybank ===
In May 2008, Abdul Wahid was appointed president and CEO of Maybank, replacing Tan Sri Amirsham Abdul Aziz, who was appointed a Minister in the Prime Minister's Department in charge of the Economic Planning Unit (EPU) after the 12th General Election.

In the three months prior to his arrival, Maybank finalized three major acquisitions, An Binh Bank in Vietnam, Bank International Indonesia (BII) and MCB Bank in Pakistan. He faced three major challenges in the first few months at Maybank. Firstly, he had to follow through on the three major acquisitions costing some RM11 billion and to raise the necessary equity and debt capital required to fund the acquisitions. Second, he had to deal with the 2008 financial crisis. And third, to improve the financial performance of Maybank.

While the corporate finance team was busy completing the three acquisitions, the rest of the management and staff members were implementing the performance improvement program called LEAP30, a series of 30 initiatives identified to improve Maybank's performance and restore its market leadership.

After 18 months, assets and deposits grew faster, customer service enhanced, asset quality improved and profit after tax bounced back to a record RM3.8 billion for financial year 2010. Maybank was back as the number one bank in Malaysia and the most valuable company listed on Bursa Malaysia.

Though this satisfied the team, Board and shareholders, there was still a concern when it came to sustainability. Professional fatigue was evident and there was a need to revise the organizational structure and revisit the company's mission. Thus, a "Tiger Summit" was held in Putrajaya which gathered the top 1,000 managers and leaders. At this summit, the organization adopted a mission statement focused on community-oriented financial services.

Organizationally, a new "House of Maybank" was created with three business pillars of Community Financial Services, Global Wholesale Banking and Insurance & Takaful with Islamic Financial Services and International Operations straddling across the three business pillars. With the new mission and new "house", Maybank continued to grow in Malaysia and ASEAN countries.

=== 2013–2016: Minister in the Prime Minister's Department ===
Abdul Wahid was appointed a Minister in the Prime Minister's Department in charge of Economic Planning on 5 June 2013. He oversaw a number of government agencies such as Economic Planning Unit, Public-Private Partnership Unit (UKAS), Department of Statistics, Ekuiti Nasional Berhad (EKUINAS) and Talent Corporation (TALENCORP), TERAJU and Yayasan Pendidikan Peneraju Bumiputera.

In a statement, Abdul Wahid said that being appointed one of the Ministers in the Prime Minister's Department was humbling and pledged to use his banking experience to help Malaysia.

He was a member of the Board of Directors of Malaysia Healthcare Travel Council, Council member of East Coast Economic Region Development Council (ECERDC), Northern Corridor Implementation Authority (NCIA), Council Member of Aerospace Malaysia, board member of Yayasan Peneraju Pendidikan Bumiputera and Chairman of Investment Committee of Innovation Agency of Malaysia.

=== 2016–2018: Permodalan Nasional Berhad ===
He was appointed Group Chairman of Permodalan Nasional Berhad (PNB) on 1 August 2016 following the completion of his term as a Senator and Minister in the Prime Minister's Department. Under his leadership, PNB increased its syariah-compliant investment and financing product with the goal for Malaysia to be the centre of global Islamic banking.

On 29 June 2018, his resignation as the Group Chairman was confirmed by PNB and Malaysia's former Bank Governor Zeti Akhtar Aziz was announced to succeed his position.

=== 2019–present: Universiti Kebangsaan Malaysia and Bursa Malaysia ===
Abdul Wahid was appointed the new chairman of Universiti Kebangsaan Malaysia (UKM) board of directors on late 2018 to replace the leaving chairman, Tan Sri Dr Ibrahim Saad. He held the post from 1 November 2018 until 31 October 2021.

He was appointed the chairman of Bursa Malaysia, the country's stock exchange on 17 April 2020 by the Minister of Finance, Tengku Zafrul Aziz. His term of office started on 1 May, following the retirement of his predecessor, Shireen Ann Zaharah Muhiudeen. The share price of the stock exchange rose following the announcement.

== Honors and awards ==
=== Honors of Malaysia ===
- Malaysia
  - Commander of the Order of Loyalty to the Crown of Malaysia (PSM) – Tan Sri (4 June 2016)
- Negeri Sembilan
  - Knight Grand Companion of the Order of Loyalty to Negeri Sembilan (SSNS) – Dato' Seri (14 January 2020)
- Pahang
  - Knight Grand Companion of the Order of Sultan Ahmad Shah of Pahang (SSAP) – Dato' Sri (24 October 2007)
  - Knight Companion of the Order of Sultan Ahmad Shah of Pahang (DSAP) – Dato' (24 October 2003)
- Selangor
  - Knight Grand Companion of the Order of Sultan Sharafuddin Idris Shah (SSIS) – Dato' Setia (11 December 2016)

=== Awards ===
- Malaysia's CEO of the Year Award 2006 by Business Times/American Express
- Asian Banker's 2013 Leadership Achievement Award for Malaysia
- The Edge Value Creator Award 2013
