= Academic ranks in Malaysia =

Academic ranks in Malaysia are the titles, relative importance and power of professors, researchers, and administrative personnel held in academia. Generally, Malaysia uses Commonwealth academic ranks. However, there are universities using their own academic titles.

There are a significant number of ranks, but the most common are pensyarah or lecturer (equivalent to assistant professor in the North American system), pensyarah kanan or senior lecturer (equivalent to associate professor in the North American system), profesor madya or associate professor (equivalent to professor in the North American system) and profesor or professor (equivalent to distinguished professor in the North American system).

== General ranks ==
Academic titles in Malaysian universities can be classified into five categories: Professorship, lectureship, consultantship, teachership and fellowship.

=== Professorship ===
Upon attaining professorship, Professors and Associate Professors from Malaysian public and private universities will automatically become a member or an associate member respectively, of the National Council of Professors. Professors are required to contribute 40% in research and publication, 20% in teaching and supervision, 20% in academic leadership, 10% in consultation, and 10% in university or community service, while associate professors shall contribute 35% in research and publication, 30% in teaching and supervision, 10% in academic leadership, 10% in consultation, 10% in university service, and 5% in community service..

- Profesor Diraja (Royal Professor); the highest professorship in Malaysia which is bestowed by the King. The two holders of this title are Ungku Aziz of the University of Malaya, awarded in 1978 and Syed Muhammad Naquib al-Attas in 2024.
- Profesor Emeritus (Emeritus Professor) is a retired professor of pay grades Gred Khas B and Gred Khas A.
- Profesor Ulung (Distinguished Professor, pay grade: TURUS III, TURUS II and TURUS I) is an outstanding senior professor. He may be equivalent to or higher than the Director-General of Education and the Director-General of Higher Education. This is a very rare title.
- Profesor (Professor, pay grade: Gred Khas C, Gred Khas B and Gred Khas A) is the ordinary form of full professor, but corresponds to a distinguished professor in North America.
  - Profesor Adjung (Adjunct Professor) is a non-academic who had contributed to the development of a field of knowledge.
  - Profesor Pelawat (Visiting Professor) is a university professor who serve as the same in another university as a visitor.
- Profesor Madya (Associate Professor, pay grade: DS14), corresponds to a full professor in North America or a reader in the United Kingdom.
- Profesor Sokongan (Assistant Professor, pay grade: DS13), corresponds to associate professor in North America. Rarely used, especially in International Islamic University of Malaysia.

=== Lectureship ===
According to the Malaysian Public Services Department, lecturers shall contribute 50% in teaching and supervision, 20% in research and publication, 5% in academic leadership, 5% in consultation, 10% in university service, and 10% in community service.

- Pensyarah Cemerlang (Excellent Lecturer), established only in Aminuddin Baki Institute, Teacher's Education Institutes, Matriculation Colleges and Pre-University Classes.
- Pensyarah Kanan (Senior Lecturer, pay grade: DS13), equivalent to the Malaysian rank Penolong Profesor, and corresponds to Associate Professor in North America.
- Pensyarah (Lecturer, pay grade: DS11), corresponds to assistant professor in North America.
- Pensyarah Pembantu (Assistant Lecturer), equivalent to Pensyarah Muda (Junior Lecturer), Pensyarah Sambilan Sepenuh Masa (Full-time Assistant Lecturer), Tutor (Tutor), Pemudahcara (Facilitator), Felo Siswazah (Graduate Fellow) or Calon Pensyarah (Academic Trainee). They could be either a fresh graduate or a student.

=== Consultantship ===
- Pakar Perunding Kanan (Senior Consultant), equivalent to Professor
- Pakar Perunding (Consultant), equivalent to Associate Professor

=== Specialist ===
- Principal Specialist, equivalent to Profesor Madya
- Senior Specialist, equivalent to Pensyarah Kanan
- Specialist (Consultant), equivalent to Pensyarah
- Instructor, equivalent to Penolong Pensyarah

=== Teachership ===
- Guru Cemerlang (Excellent Teacher), a teaching expert in school. He may be equivalent to a university professor.
- Guru Kanan (Senior Teacher)
- Guru (Teacher), equivalent to Jurulatih (Trainer) and Pengajar (Instructor).
- Pembantu Guru (Teaching Assistant), equivalent to Pembantu Pengurusan Murid (Pupils' Personal Assistant) in kindergarten and special schools.

=== Fellowship ===
- Felo Yang Amat Utama (Very Distinguished Fellow), equivalent to Distinguished Professor
- Felo Utama (Distinguished Fellow), equivalent to Professor
- Felo Kanan (Senior Fellow), equivalent to Associate Professor
- Felo (Fellow), equivalent to Assistant Professor

== Administrative ranks ==
=== Universities and higher institutions ===
- Canselor (Chancellor), a university royal patron and ceremonial head
- Pro-Canselor (Pro-Chancellor), equivalent to a deputy Chancellor. Can be held by both member(s) of the royal family who held the title Chancellor or a civilian.
- Presiden (President) can be:
  - The university chairman; or
  - The chairman of the university board of directors; or
  - The university chief executive officer.
- Rektor (Rector); assisted by Timbalan Rektor (Deputy Rector), can be:
  - The chief executive officer of a university, university colleges and Teachers' Education Institute; or
  - The head of branch campus.
- Naib Canselor (Vice Chancellor), the chief executive officer of a university. His deputy is Timbalan Naib Canselor (Deputy Vice Chancellor); and sometimes Penolong Naib Canselor (Assistant Vice Chancellor), lower than the Deputy Vice Chancellor, head of colleges in universities.
- Dekan (Dean); head of faculty/school. His deputy is Timbalan Dekan (Deputy Dean).
- Pengarah (Director), assisted is Timbalan Pengarah (Deputy Director) or Penolong Pengarah (Assistant Director), can be:
  - The head of a university subordinate; or
  - The chief executive officer of an institute, a college and a polytechnic.
- Pengetua (Principal); head of university residential college; equivalent to Ketua Felo (Head of Fellows).
- Ketua Jabatan (Head of Department)
- Ketua Program (Head of Programme)
- Penyelaras (Coordinator)
- Felo (Fellow) is an officer attached to a university residential college. In some university residental colleges housing undergraduate students, postgraduate students may be appointed as fellows.

=== Schools ===
- Pengetua (Principal), head of secondary school. At certain colleges, the term "Headmaster" is preferred, reflecting the school's historical ties to the British educational tradition and its unique governance, which includes the offices of a Royal Patron and Chairman.
- Guru Besar (Headmaster/Headmistress); head of kindergarten and primary school.
- Guru Penolong Kanan (Assistant Principal/Headmaster) of primary and secondary school. Sometimes it can be referred as Timbalan Pengetua or Penolong Pengetua.
- Ketua Bidang (Headteacher) of an academic field in secondary school. It can be referred sometimes as Ketua Jabatan (Head of Department).
- Ketua Panitia (Course Leader) in primary and secondary schools.
- Penyelaras (Coordinator), a teacher who performs an administrative duty.
- Warden (Warden) is an inspector of a school dormitory. His leader is Ketua Warden (Chief Warden).

== Others ==
=== Nazir ===
Nazir (Inspector) is an academic who inspect educational institutions and implementation of educational system in schools. Reporting to the Minister, an Inspector also provides guidance and advice to all key stakeholders on improvisation of education.

=== SISC+ ===
SISC+ stands for School Improvement Specialist Coach, a teacher assigned to mentor core subject teachers in schools.

A SISC+ is responsible to:

1. Build relationship and guide core subject teachers;
2. Provide important trainings for core subject teachers, in collaboration with the Ministry and District Education Office; and
3. Design and manage special intervention to upgrade teaching quality in schools.

A SISC+ is appointed based on these terms:

1. A teacher shall possess a bachelor's degree in education, or a bachelor's degree in any field with a diploma of education;
2. A teacher shall possess at least 5 years of teaching experience in schools;
3. A teacher shall be knowledgeable in teaching the subject of choice;
4. A teacher shall exhibit an excellent instructional skill; and
5. A teacher shall be ready to learn and try new and innovative teaching and learning methods and approaches.

=== Pegawai Cemerlang ===
Pegawai Cemerlang (Excellent Officer) is a teacher who perform administrative duties outside schools outstandingly. However, this is only applicable to those with a bachelor's degree in education. Those with only a Diploma of Education working administratively outside schools outstandingly is called Pengelola Cemerlang (Excellent Executive Officer) or Penyelia Cemerlang (Excellent Supervisor).

This is equivalent with Pengetua Cemerlang (Excellent Principal) in secondary schools, and Guru Besar Cemerlang (Excellent Headmaster/Headmistress) in primary schools.
