= Azah Aziz =

Malaysian writer and poetist

Personal details
- Born: Sharifah Azah binti Syed Mohammad Alsagoff; August 21, 1928 Straits Settlements (now Singapore)
- Died: July 9, 2012 (aged 83) Kuala Lumpur, Malaysia
- Resting place: Bukit Kiara Muslim Cemetery, Kuala Lumpur, Malaysia
- Spouse: Ungku Abdul Aziz (m. 1946)
- Children: Zeti Akhtar Aziz
- Occupation: Writer, columnist, cultural figure

Azah Aziz, better known as Mak Ungku (21 August 1928 – 9 July 2012) was a Malay cultural figure in Malaysia. She was married to Royal Professor Ungku Abdul Aziz Ungku Abdul Hamid and the mother of Zeti Akhtar Aziz, 7th Governor of the Central Bank of Malaysia.

== Biography ==
She married Ungku Abdul Aziz bin Ungku Abdul Hamid. Together they had a daughter, YM Tan Sri Dato' Ungku Dr.Zeti Akhtar Aziz, who was formerly the Governor of the Central Bank of Malaysia. Azah died on July 9, 2012, at the age of 84.

=== Career ===
From 1941–1951, Azah worked at the Johor Bahru Welfare Department. Following this, she was employed as Secretary of the Social Department at the University of Malaya Singapore. She continued as Secretary in the Malay Studies Department at University of Malaya.

=== Journalist and Author ===
Azah Aziz was the founder and President of the Malaysian Women's Journalists Association (1971–1978) and the University Women's Association.

She was among the first women pioneering for the fate and rights of women, especially the issues of salary equality between men and women, and the issue of separate taxes for working wives. She also advocated the Non-Muslim Marriages and Muslim Family Amendments.

From 1957 to 1973, she wrote for several magazines, including Berita Harian. From 1973-1978 she was the editor of Utasan Malaysia and a consultant for women's magazines. She is the first person to introduce the haiku, a short Japanese poem, to Malaysian society.

Azah is also among the first women in Malaysia to publish books and children's songs through her own company, 'Akaz'.

Azah Aziz attended the Asia-Pacific Women's Writers Conference in East West Center, Honolulu, Hawaii (1972), Afro-Asian Women Symposium in Alexandria, Egypt, in conjunction with the International Women's Day (1975). She was a member of the national library advisory board and a member of the advisory board of The Encyclopaedia of Malaysia.

== Art ==
Azah is known as 'Tokoh Budayawan Melayu', or a 'Malay cultural figure', because of her hobbies and interests collecting traditional textiles, jewelry, traditional clothes and traditional Malay handicrafts. Since the 1950s, she has written and lectured on Malay culture and arts and introduced dance drama clothing in the Asean University Arts Festival.

She was additionally a talented poet herself and her 'pantun', a Malay poetic form, has been featured in Mastika magazine.

== Philanthropy ==
She became a member of the board of trustees of the Tun Abdul Razak Foundation (1977-), a FINAS board member (1981–1984), a member of the national cultural advisory council (dissolved) (1978–1983) (1987–1990), and a member of KARYANEKA advisory board (1987 - until dissolved). She was also a member of the Malaysian handicraft development board member and a member of the Copyright Tribunal (1987–1989).

She is also one of the founders of the Islamic Women's Action Organization (Pertiwi), which actively defends the fate of women and children in Malaysia.

== Death ==
On July 9, 2012, Azah Aziz died at the age 84 from a stroke. The funeral was held at Saidina Mosque, Abu Bakar As-Siddiq, Bangsar and there was a funeral ceremony at Bukit Kiara Islamic Cemetery. Among the attendants were former Prime Minister of Malaysia, Tun Dr. Mahathir Mohamad and his wife, Tun Dr. Siti Hasmah Mohd Ali, as well as family members and close acquaintances.
