= Asia School of Business =

University in Bukit Tunku, Kuala Lumpur, Malaysia

Coordinates: 3.15758°N 101.69103°E

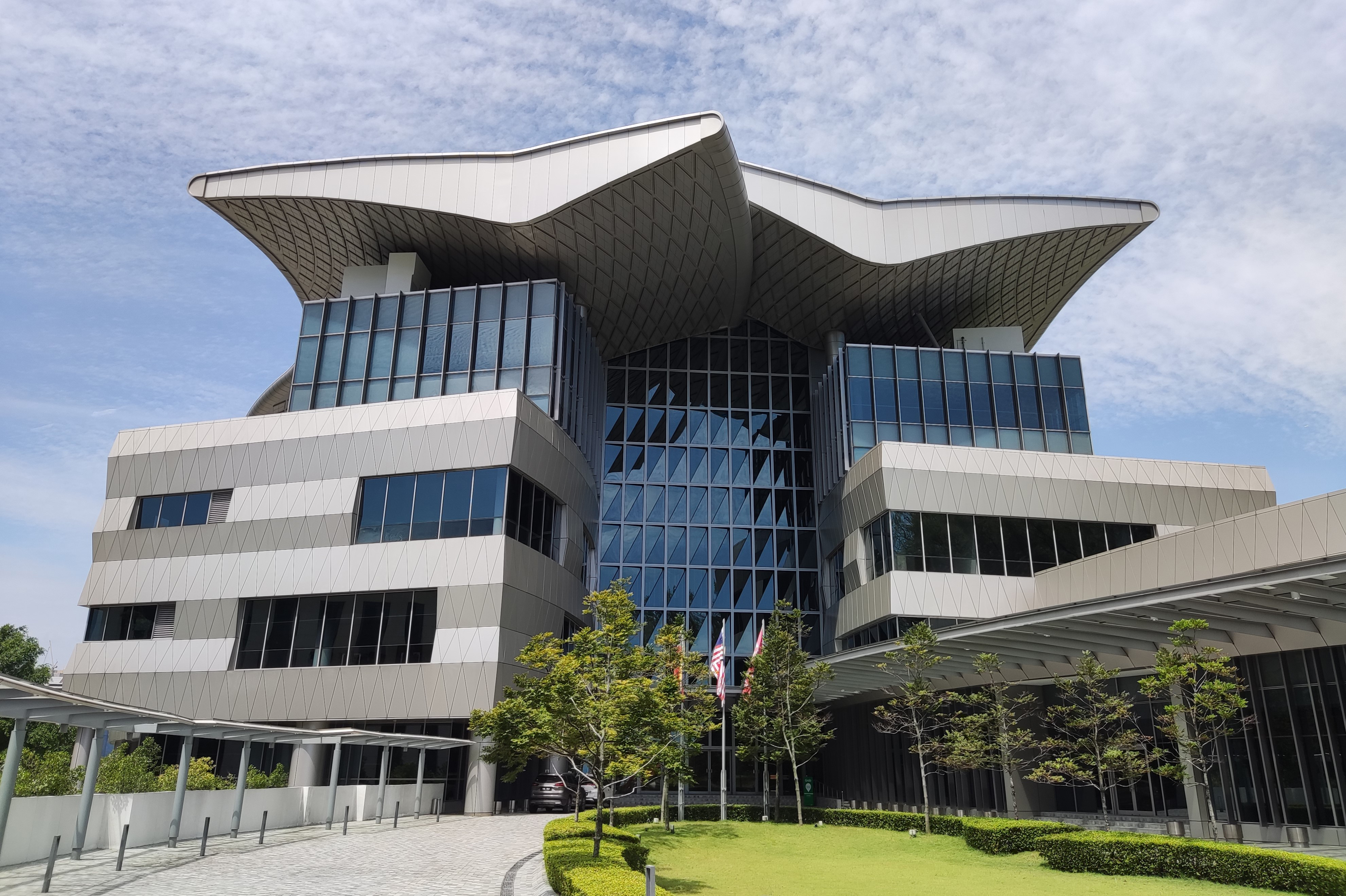
- Type: Private graduate
- Established: 2015
- Affiliations: MIT Sloan School of Management; Bank Negara Malaysia; AACSB; Association of Asia Pacific Business Schools (AAPBS); EFMD Global
- Dean: Joseph Cherian (CEO/ President)
- Faculty: 50 (includes full-time MIT Sloan International Faculty Fellows and engaged MIT Sloan faculty)
- Postgraduates: ~80 full-time MBA students
- Location: Kuala Lumpur, Malaysia
- Language: English
- Website: asb.edu.my

Asia School of Business (ASB) is a graduate business school in Kuala Lumpur.

Established as a collaboration between MIT Sloan School of Management and Bank Negara Malaysia, the central bank of Malaysia, ASB offers a 12-month full-time MBA program and executive education classes for local and international students. Through the partnership, MIT Sloan and Bank Negara collaborate on academic program design, curriculum design, organizational design, admissions, and the school's administration.

ASB offers MBA, EMBA and Master in Central Banking programs. Students study primarily at the ASB campus located in Kuala Lumpur, with programmes also offering short-term residentials at MIT Sloan, which is located in Cambridge, Massachusetts.

ASB Graduates are granted Affiliate Alumni status at MIT Sloan.

== History ==
ASB was founded in 2015 by Zeti Akhtar Aziz, the former governor of Bank Negara Malaysia, and Professor Richard Schmalensee, Dean Emeritus of MIT Sloan. The school opened in 2016, offering a full-time MBA degree. The first cohort, the Class of 2018, arrived in Kuala Lumpur for orientation in Fall 2016. The inaugural graduation ceremony was held in Spring 2018.

In 2019, ASB launched its MBA for Working Professionals program, a 22-month program designed in modular format for working professionals.

In 2020, ASB merged with The Iclif Leadership and Governance Centre, forming the ASB Iclif Executive Education Center (Iclif).

ASB moved into its new 30-acre campus in Kuala Lumpur in the second half of 2020.

== Degree Programs and Curriculum ==
=== MBA Program ===
ASB's main program is its one-year MBA program where students study primarily at the ASB campus located in Kuala Lumpur, with a three-week residential experience at MIT.

Admissions have 40 to 45 slots available in each year's MBA intake, and all enrolled full-time residential MBA students receive some form of scholarships and financial aid, including full scholarships. Approximately 80% of ASB's students come from outside of Malaysia, and around 43% of the students are female (while other business schools in the region have student bodies that range from 35% women to 40% women). Upon graduation, students receive a Certificate of Completion issued from the Massachusetts Institute of Technology and become affiliate members of the alumni organization of MIT Sloan.

=== MBA Program for Working Professionals ===
The Asia School of Business (ASB) MBA for Working Professionals Program (MBA-WP) is a 16-month program designed in modular format for working professionals.

The program includes a 3-weeks immersion at MIT Sloan in Cambridge, Massachusetts, and 3 hands-on business practicums with the students' respective employers.

=== Master of Central Banking Program ===
The Master of Central Banking (MCB) is a year-long residential program designed especially for central bankers.

== Non-Degree Programs and Executive Education ==
=== Executive Education ===
The Iclif Executive Education Center (Iclif) at Asia School of Business (formerly The Iclif Leadership and Governance Centre) provides corporate governance training and non-degreed programs to support the professional development of C-Suites and senior management. Iclif was established by Bank Negara Malaysia in 2003 as an Asia-based independent non-profit organization. Since its inception, Iclif has also branched out to offer programs and research opportunities in the areas not only on leadership development, but also in corporate governance. In 2020, Iclif merged with ASB to extend its set of offerings in executive education, and now offers additional courses in general management and finance.

Currently, Iclif offers a set of Open-Enrollment Programs and Custom-Built programs. Participants in Open-Enrollment courses can upgrade their participation credits into an Executive Certificate in one of the four available Tracks: Leadership, Finance & Global Economy, Corporate Governance, and General Management. In addition to the Open-Enrollment programs, Iclif also offers a set of mandatory programs for Malaysian board members of listed companies (Mandatory Accreditation Program (MAP)) and for Malaysian directors of financial institutions (Financial Institutions Directors’ Education (FIDE)).

== Campus ==
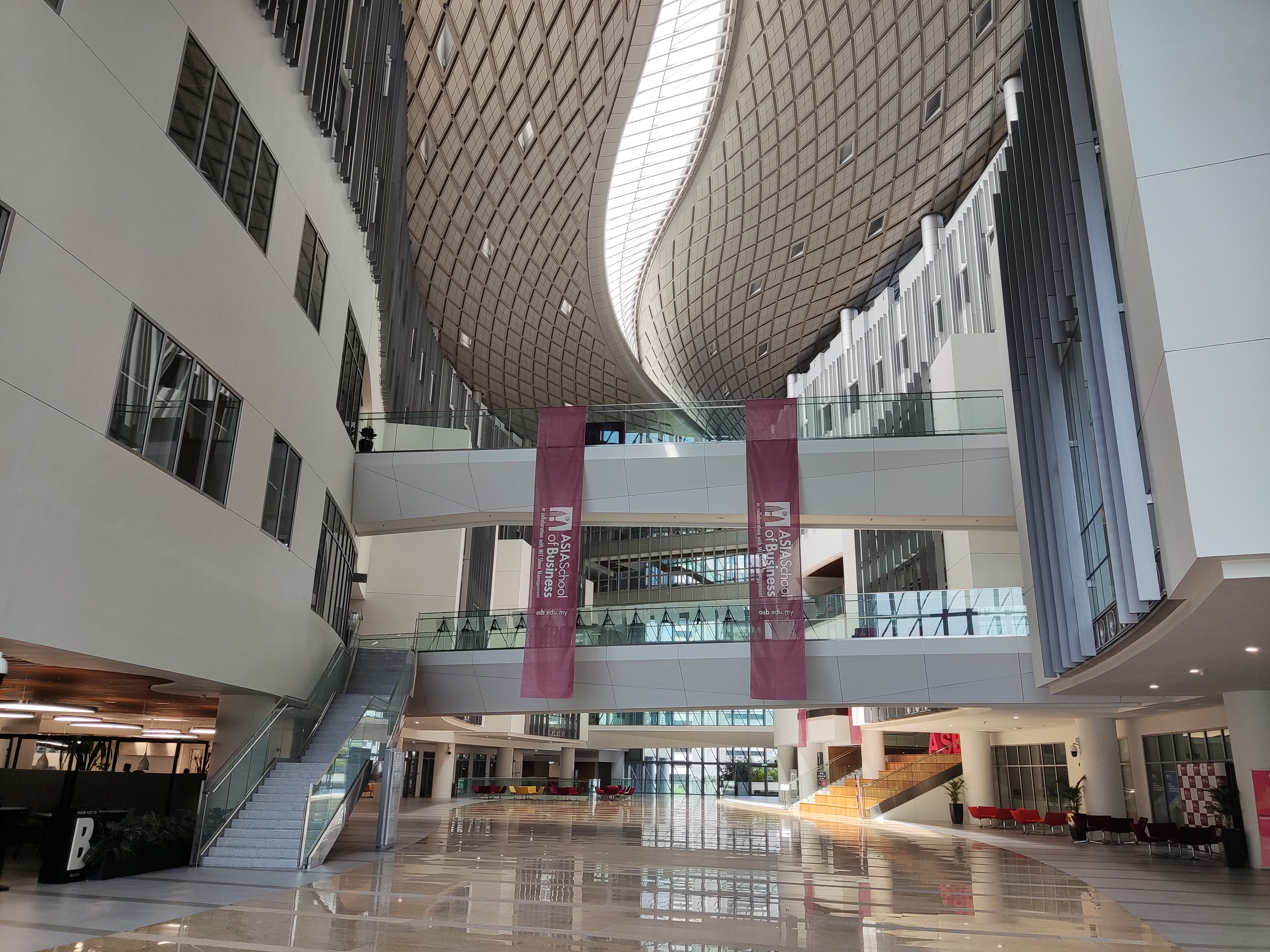
Interior of Asia School of Business

ASB's campus is located on a 30-acre plot of land in Kuala Lumpur beside Bank Negara Malaysia headquarters.

ASB's campus consists of an academic village designed to host the MBA, Master of Central Banking, executive education courses, and other events, as well as a residential quad that has the capacity to house 700 students, visiting faculty, and short-term students.

ASB’s sprawling 22.2-acre residential and academic campus is located near the central business district and can accommodate over 1,200 students, faculty, and staff.

=== Academic Building ===
The academic building spans six levels. The ground level (Level G) and first floor (Level 1) are public areas. Levels 2 and 3 are designed around learning and education – housing classrooms, research centers, study spaces, and a library. Levels 4 and 5 are built around faculty collaboration, scholarship, and innovation.

== Research centers ==
- Maybank Center for ASEAN Research, research center endowed by Maybank
- Sapura Energy Center for Technology and Strategy, research center endowed by Sapura Energy
- AirAsia Innovation and Entrepreneurship Center (IEC), research center endowed by AirAsia
- The Central Banking Research Center (CBRC)
- Center for Sustainable Small-Owners (CSS)

== Research faculty staffs ==
- Michael Frese
- Sanjay Sarma

== See also ==
- MIT Sloan School of Management, American institutional partner
- Bank Negara Malaysia, Malaysian Institutional partner
- Massachusetts Institute of Technology, American institutional partner
