= Malaysian Re =

Malaysian Reinsurance Berhad
- Industry: Reinsurance; Retakaful
- Founded: 1973; 53 years ago
- Headquarters: Bangunan Malaysian Re; 17 Lorong Dungun, Kuala Lumpur, Malaysia
- Key people: Dato' Sulaiman Mohd Tahir (Chairman); Ahmad Noor Azhari (President & CEO); Rafliz Ridzuan (Chief Underwriting Officer)
- Revenue: ▼RM1.32 Billion (2018)
- Net income: ▲RM86 Million (2018)
- Total assets: ▲RM3.83 Billion (2018)
- Total equity: ▲RM1.44 Billion (2018)
- Parent: MNRB Holdings Berhad (100%); Permodalan Nasional Berhad (Ultimate Parent)
- Subsidiaries: Labuan Re (20%)
- Website: www.malaysian-re.com.my

Malaysian Reinsurance Berhad (known as Malaysian Re) is a Malaysian reinsurance company. It is Malaysia's largest reinsurer, commanding more than 60% of reinsurance accepted premium in the country. In the ASEAN market, Malaysian Re is currently the region's largest national reinsurer by asset size. The company also has a strong market presence in Asia and the Middle East.

In 2005, as a result of a restructuring exercise within the MNRB Group, the company's reinsurance license, business and assets were transferred to its subsidiary company, Malaysian Reinsurance Berhad. Pursuant to the restructuring, Malaysian National Reinsurance Berhad became an investment holding company and changed its name to MNRB Holdings Berhad (MNRB). Today, MNRB is listed on the Bursa Malaysia.

== Company's Structure ==
Malaysian Re is a wholly owned subsidiary of MNRB Holdings Berhad which is listed on the Main Market of Bursa Malaysia Securities Berhad. MNRB's other subsidiaries include Takaful Ikhlas and Malaysian Re (Dubai) Ltd which serves Malaysian Re's Middle East market. MNRB is one of strategic companies under the portfolio of Malaysia's sovereign wealth fund, Permodalan Nasional Berhad (PNB).

== Corporate Developments ==
In 2015, Malaysian Re received approval from Bank Negara Malaysia to conduct family and general retakaful business.

Fitch Ratings upgraded Malaysian Re's Insurer Financial Strength (IFS) rating to ‘A’ (Strong) from ‘A−’ (Strong) with a Stable Outlook on 24 January 2019. A.M. Best also affirmed the Financial Strength Rating of “A−“ (Excellent) and an Issuer Credit Rating of “a-“ to Malaysian Reinsurance Berhad or Malaysian Re, with Stable outlook for both ratings.
