= Personal initiative =

Behavior that overcomes barriers to achieve a goal

Personal initiative (PI) is self-starting and proactive behavior that overcomes barriers to achieve a goal. The concept was developed by Michael Frese and coworkers in the 1990s.

The three facets of PI – self-starting, future oriented, and overcoming barriers form a syndrome of proactive behaviors relating to each other empirically. Self-starting implies that the goals are set by an individual themselves and not by someone else. These self-started goals are often related to future orientation that involves having long-term focus and preparation for future demands and problems. Future demands can be met by proactive actions – 'pro' meaning preparatory or beforehand in Greek. Thus, a proactive approach attempts to get pre-signals signifying future obstacles and developing plans to prevent them. Implementation of long-term goals often leads to new setbacks. Initiative, therefore, implies that one will overcome these barriers actively and persistently.

PI stands in contrast to a passive approach, which is characterized by doing what one is told, giving up when faced with difficulties, and reacting to environmental demands. Proponents of PI have argued that it may become more important in future workplaces as they require a high degree of self-reliance.

PI is often conceptualized as the behavioral component of the general proactivity concept; it is also related but not identical to work engagement.

== Relevance ==
PI is developed as a performance outcome within the action (regulation) theory tradition. While PI is consistently linked to higher work performance and innovativeness of individuals, it also interacts with other types of constructs of intrinsic motivation. The PI concept was used to create an effective training tool, which is now being used to help thousands of entrepreneurs and organisations in developing countries to improve their businesses.

== Climate ==
PI Climate refers to formal and informal organizational practices which guide and support a proactive, self-starting, and persistent approach toward work. Studies have shown that individual personal initiative is related to idea generation, entrepreneurial success, and innovation implementation behavior. Similarly, a climate that fosters personal initiative helps to predict radical innovation as well as profitability of firms. As problems appear during the implementation of an innovation, innovation paired with a low level of climate for initiative may negatively affect company performance.

There may be higher uncertainty with new production systems leading to unexpected problems and barriers that need to be overcome; PI climate helps here to avoid production breakdowns. For firm performance there is an interaction between process innovation and climate for personal initiative - climate for personal initiative functions as a moderator. Organizations that display a work environment characterized by personal initiative have a higher chance of promoting the effectiveness of process innovations.

== Facets of PI ==
PI suggests a model for training with action sequence goal setting, information gathering and prognosis, plan development and execution, plan monitoring, and feedback processing. The facet theory of PI depicted in the table provides a general concept of active performance from an action theory perspective. Every step of the action sequence can be supported by PI.

Facets of Personal Initiative
Action sequence	Self-starting	Future oriented	Persistence
Goals / redefinition of tasks	Develop goals that are unique and creative, rather than merely replicating those of others.	Predict future opportunities and problems and set goals to address them.	Even when frustrated, maintain existing goals.
Information collection and prognosis	Active labour market research and outreach.; Analyse the environment in search of relevant innovations and technologies.	Find out about upcoming potential problems or opportunities.; Accrue information on alternative actions.	Continue to seek out relevant information, even if it is challenging, complex or frustrating.
Planning and execution	Develop plans that demand one's own actions.	Develop contingency plan (Plan B).; Develop plans for potential opportunities	Go back to plan as quickly as possible in case of difficulties.
Monitoring and feedback	Actively search for feedback.	Use feedback and pre-signals to prepare for problems and opportunities	Keep looking for feedback even when it gets difficult (esp. negative feedback).

== Training entrepreneurs ==
PI was used to create an effective training tool for entrepreneurs and micro-businesses in developing countries to improve their effectiveness. PI training has been studied with randomized controlled trials and shown to be successful. It leads to a proactive entrepreneurial mindset. Participants learn ways to set themselves apart from other businesses, as well as to anticipate problems, overcome setbacks, improve opportunity planning skills, and do other long-term planning. Not every experiment on PI training was successful, however the impact of personal initiative training was higher in a large randomised controlled filed experiment than Traditional Business training.

== Consequences ==
=== Positive outcomes ===
Higher PI workers benefit positively in their careers via several avenues including:

- Increased innovativeness in their goals, clearer career plans, and a higher degree of execution in these goals and plans.
- Increased employability.
- Increased political savviness, innovation, and likelihood to take the initiative advancing their careers.
- Increased career proactivity, initiative, and progression.
- Increased performance, both in the role of an employee as well as in the role of an entrepreneur.
- Increased and continuous education resulting in individuals being able to work more effectively.

=== Potentially negative outcomes ===
PI can also have negative outcomes for employees. Showing PI can be harmful on different levels: for the employees themselves, for teammates, and for the entire organization. If management expects employees to be proactive, it may burden employees with extreme aspirations. On the organizational level, high PI among employees may reduce the possibility of the organizations to control and to socialize members of the organization.
