= Ungku Abdul Aziz =

Malaysian economist (1922–2020)

Yang Mulia Royal Professor Datuk Ungku Abdul Aziz PGDK
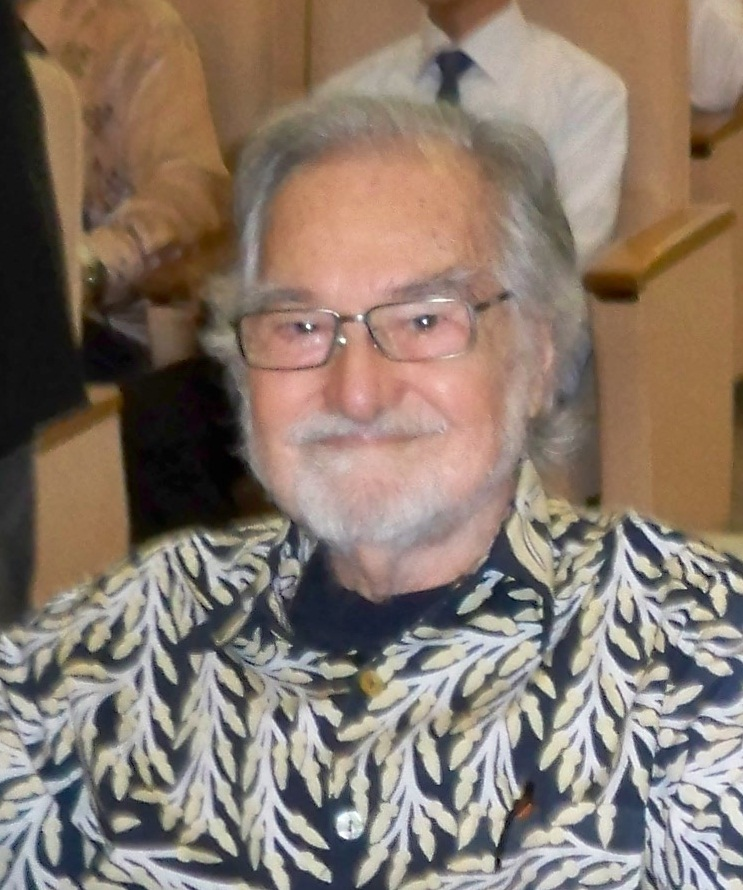

3rd Vice-Chancellor of University of Malaya
- In office October 1968 – February 1988
- Preceded by: J. H. E. Griffiths
- Succeeded by: Syed Hussein Alatas

1st Director of Dewan Bahasa dan Pustaka
- In office 1956–1957
- Preceded by: Position established
- Succeeded by: Syed Nasir Ismail

Personal details
- Born: Ungku Abdul Aziz bin Ungku Abdul Hamid; 28 January 1922 London, England
- Died: 15 December 2020 (aged 98) Prince Court Hospital, Kuala Lumpur, Malaysia
- Resting place: Bukit Kiara Muslim Cemetery, Kuala Lumpur, Malaysia
- Spouses: Sharifah Azah Mohamed Alsagoff (m. 1946; died 2012) Rahaiah Baheran (m. 2014)
- Children: Zeti Akhtar Aziz
- Education: English College Johore Bahru
- Alma mater: University of Malaya (DipArts, BA in Economics); Waseda University (DEcon)
- Occupation: Economist, lecturer
- Known for: The first person to hold the title of Royal Professor in Malaysia
- House: Temenggong

Ungku Abdul Aziz bin Ungku Abdul Hamid (28 January 1922 – 15 December 2020) was a Malaysian economist and university professor. He was the 3rd Vice-Chancellor of the University of Malaya from 1968 to 1988 and the 1st General Director of the Council on Language and Literature of Malaysia from 1956 until 1957. He was the first to be awarded the title of Royal Professor (Profesor Diraja) in 1978.

== Early life, family and education ==
He was born into the Johor Royal Family. His father, Ungku Abdul Hamid Ungku Abdul Majid was a Malayan prince and military officer. He was a cousin of Syed Muhammad Naquib al-Attas and Syed Hussein Alatas as well as Sultan Ibrahim of Johor on his father's side. His father was of Malay and Turkish descent, while his mother was English.

He graduated from the English college at Johore Bahru and the Malay school in Batu Pahat. He received Diploma in Arts from Raffles College, Singapore (now University of Malaya) and Bachelor of Arts in economics at University of Malaya, Singapore (now University of Malaya in Kuala Lumpur) in 1951. He then defended his doctoral dissertation in Waseda University (Tokyo, Japan) in 1964.

His daughter, Zeti Akhtar Aziz, was the former governor of Bank Negara Malaysia, Malaysia's central bank.

== Academic career ==
He worked in the state administration of Johore, in 1952–1961 as a lecturer at the University of Malaya (Singapore), with a one-year break, when he headed the Council on Language and Literature of Malaysia.

In the years 1962–1965, he was a professor and dean of the Faculty of Economics of the University of Malaya (Kuala Lumpur), while in 1968–1988, he was promoted to vice-chancellor of this university. He was the first Malaysian to become the vice-chancellor of University of Malaya. On his initiative, the university created the Botanical Garden, the Museum of Asian Art, the cooperative bookstore. He is the author of the economic justification of a number of industrial projects, more than 50 books and monographs on social and economic problems of Malaysia, consultant to UN specialized organizations (ILO, UNESCO, UN Economic Commission for Asia and the Far East).

On 17 June 1978, he was awarded the rank and title of Royal Professor (Profesor Diraja) by the Yang di-Pertuan Agong of Malaysia. Prior to 2025, he was the only person in Malaysia to hold that rank, until Syed Muhammad Naquib al-Attas, who was also his half-cousin, awarded in the same rank.

== Honours and awards ==
=== Honours of Malaysia ===
- Sabah
  - Commander of the Order of Kinabalu (PGDK) – Datuk (1973)

=== Foreign honours ===
- Japan
  - First Class of the Order of the Sacred Treasure (1989)

=== Awards ===
- Rank of the Royal Professor (1978) (awarded by the Yang di-Pertuan Agong of Malaysia) (only in Malaysia)
- Japan Foundation Award (1981)
- Honorary Doctorate from the University of Bath (1992).
- The Fukuoka Prize (1993)
- The title of "Outstanding Figure of the Islamic era" (Malay: Tokoh Maal Hijrah) (1997) (awarded by the Yang di-Pertuan Agong of Malaysia)
- The title of "Outstanding Figure of the National Cooperative Movement" (Malay: Tokoh Koperasi Negara) (2002)
- The Outstanding Malay Figure Award (Malay: Anugerah Melayu Terbilang) (2005)
- National Academic Award (Malay: Anugerah Akademik Negara) (2006)
- National Merdeka Award (2008)
- Rochdale Award (2009)

== Death ==
Ungku Aziz died in Prince Court Medical Centre, Kuala Lumpur at 4:30 in the evening due to old age. He was 98 and was survived by his wife, Rahaiah Baheran and his only daughter, Zeti Akhtar Aziz. He was laid to rest at the Bukit Kiara Muslim Cemetery, Kuala Lumpur.

== Namesakes ==
Several places were named after him, including:

- Sekolah Menengah Kebangsaan Ungku Aziz (SMKUA), Sabak Bernam, Selangor
- Balai Ungku Aziz, Faculty of Dentistry, University of Malaya
- Kolej Kediaman Ungku Aziz, 11th residential college at the University of Malaya
- Jalan Prof Diraja Ungku Aziz, formerly known as Jalan Universiti and named in his honour in late 2020

== Bibliography ==
- Abu Bakar A. Hamid, K. T. Joseph. The University at Pantai Valley: Glimpses of the past. Kuala Lumpur: UM Press, 2009 ISBN 9831004744
