= Sime Darby Property =

Malaysian real estate developer

Sime Darby Property Berhad
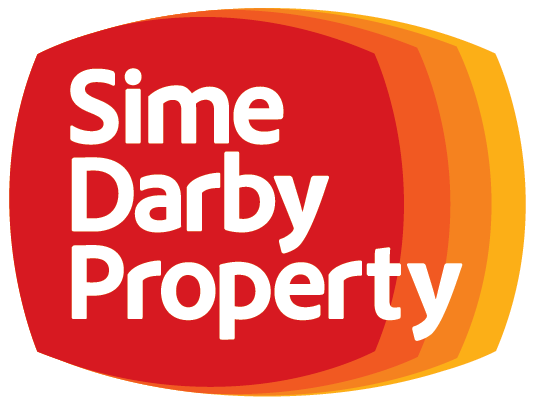
- Type: Publicly traded government-linked company (GLC) & state-owned enterprise (SOE)
- Traded as: MYX: 5288
- Industry: Property Development; Investment Holding and Provision of Management Services
- Founded: 1973; 53 years ago
- Headquarters: Ara Damansara, Petaling Jaya, Malaysia
- Key people: Dato’ Rizal Rickman Ramli (Chairman); Dato’ Seri Azmir Merican (Group Managing Director)
- Revenue: ▲RM3,436.9 million (2023)
- Operating income: ▲RM606.4 million (2023)
- Total assets: ▲RM15,928.7 million (2023)
- Website: www.simedarbyproperty.com

Sime Darby Property Berhad 197301002148 (15631-P) is a Malaysian real estate developer with operations in Malaysia and the United Kingdom. Incorporated in 1973, as Sime Darby Property Sdn. Bhd., the group was created through the integration of the property arms under the former Golden Hope Plantations Berhad, Kumpulan Guthrie Berhad, and Sime Darby Berhad. The property arm of Sime Darby traces back to United Estates Projects Berhad, a property development company established in 1964. In 1985, Sime Darby purchased a large stake in United Estates Projects Berhad and the company was renamed Sime UEP Properties Berhad. Sime UEP was used to develop former oil palm plantation lands belonging to Sime Darby.

Apart from its 20,763 acres of landbank spanning from Selangor to Johor, Sime Darby Property also has assets and operations across the Asia Pacific region and the United Kingdom. It is one of the largest property developers in the country by revenue and gross development value (GDV) of current projects. The division was formed through the integration of the property arms of Golden Hope, Guthrie and Sime Darby during the 2007 Synergy Drive merger.

Sime UEP was the developer of Subang Jaya (which commenced in 1974), which has become one of the most populated townships in the Klang Valley. This was followed by the developments of USJ and Putra Heights in the surrounding areas by Sime UEP. Bukit Jelutong was developed by Guthrie beginning in 1994 on its former plantation lands. The 299-hectare Ara Damansara development by Sime UEP was launched in 2000.

Aside from its developments in the Klang Valley, Sime Darby Property has residential projects in Negeri Sembilan, Johor and Singapore. It also owns TPC Kuala Lumpur which has hosted the Malaysian Open, CIMB Classic and Sime Darby LPGA Malaysia tournaments. Sime Darby Property is also a 40-percent joint venturer in the Battersea Power Station redevelopment project.

As of September 2014, the company has a land bank of 19,000 acres (7,689 hectares), not including plantation land owned by Sime Darby Plantations which could be converted for development in the future.

As of December 2022, Sime Darby Property has built over 100,000 homes and properties across 25 townships and developments. Its portfolio includes residential, commercial, industrial, and logistics properties.

Sime Darby Property is also involved in many other real estate segments, including Investment & Asset Management, with retail, commercial, and industrial logistics assets located within Malaysia, Singapore, and the United Kingdom. Sime Darby Property was also part of an international consortium that redeveloped the Battersea Power Station in Central London. The Group currently operates 5.4 million sq. ft. of net lettable area across commercial, retail, hospitality, education, and industrial segments.

Sime Darby Property's Leisure segment manages the Kuala Lumpur Golf & Country Club (KLGCC).

== Sime Darby demerger ==
In 2017, Sime Darby announced its intention to spin off Sime Darby Property into a separate public company, without a definitive timeline. Analysts had previously speculated on the possibility of an initial public offering of the division or a merger with S P Setia by their common ultimate shareholder, Permodalan Nasional Berhad (PNB).

On 30 November 2017, Sime Darby Property was listed on Bursa Malaysia stock exchange. The company faltered in its debut on the Main Market of Bursa Malaysia by opening at RM1.30 at 9am against the issue price of RM1.50.

The property development business is complemented by investment in 2 other business segments, namely, property investment and, leisure and hospitality.

In May 2018, Sime Darby partnered with Japan's Mitsui & Co Ltd and Mitsubishi Estate Co Ltd.

== Environmental, Social & Governance ==
Sime Darby Property has been a constituent of the MSCI ACWI Small Cap Index with MSCI ESG Rating of BBB, providing disclosure to the Carbon Disclosure Project (“CDP”). The Group has been rated C for Climate Change and B− for Supplier Engagement.

The Group has worked with its philanthropic arm, Yayasan Sime Darby (YSD), to actively implement social welfare initiatives to assist underprivileged communities living within and nearby its townships. It is involved in many social impact activities nationwide, has provided aid relief and entrepreneurial development programs to underprivileged communities during the recent pandemic.

== Awards ==
- The Edge Malaysia's Top Property Developers Awards (2022)
- BCI Asia Awards — Top 10 Developers (Malaysia)
- Putra Brand Awards 2022 — Property Development Category (Platinum)
- FIABCI-Malaysia and Star Media Group's Malaysia Developer Awards 2022 — Top 10 in the ‘Top-of-The-Chart (RM1 billion and above)’ category
- FIABCI Prix D’Excellence Awards 2023 — World Gold Winner, Master Plan category
- Malaysia Landscape Architecture Awards 13 — Best Client Honor
- StarProperty All-Stars Award 2023
- 10th PropertyGuru Asia Awards Malaysia 2023 — Best Housing/Landed development
- The Edge Property Excellence Awards 2023 — Top Three Property

== Townships ==
- Subang Jaya City Centre (SJCC), situated in Subang Jaya, Selangor — 39,982 acres of land. Established in 1974.
- Kuala Lumpur Golf & Country Club (KLGCC) Resort, situated in Bukit Kiara, Kuala Lumpur — 360 acres of land. Established in 1991.
- Ara Damansara, situated in Petaling Jaya, Selangor — 739 acres of land. Established in 1999.
- Putra Heights, situated in Subang Jaya, Selangor — 1,796 acres of land. Established in 1999.
- Bandar Universiti Pagoh (BUP), situated in Muar, Johor — 4,141 acres of land. Established in 2011.
- Serenia City, situated in Sepang, Kuala Lumpur — 1,775 acres of land, winner of the Malaysian Landscape Architect Award 2018 (Best Landscape Master Plan) and the Star Property Awards 2020 (The Neighbourhood Award). Established in 2022.
- City of Elmina, situated in Shah Alam, Selangor — 5,000 acres of land, contains Malaysia's first Inclusive Playground. Established in 2022.
- Planters’ Haven, situated in Nilai, Negeri Sembilan — 246 acres of land. Established in 2022.
- Chemara Hills, situated in Sembilan, Negeri Sembilan — 43.68 acres of land.
- Nilai Impian, situated in Nilai, Negeri Sembilan — 680 acres of land.
- Bandar Ainsdale, situated in Sembilan, Negeri Sembilan — 562 acres of land.
- Bandar Bukit Raja, situated in Klang, Selangor — 4,333 acres of land. Winner of The Edge Top Property Developers Awards 2019, Star Property Awards 2019, and Malaysian Landscape Architecture Award.
- KL East, situated in Desa Melawati, Kuala Lumpur — 153 acres of land.
- Bukit Jelutong, situated in Shah Alam, Selangor — 2,200 acres of land. Winner of Best Town Planning Scheme Award, MIP (1997) and the Best Neighbourhood Landscape in Selangor, Selangor State Government (2001). Established in 1996.
- Melawati, situated in Ulu Klang, Kuala Lumpur — 882 acres of land.
- Taman Pasir Putih, situated in Zone D of Iskandar Malaysia, Johor — 356 acres of land.
- SJ7, situated in Subang Jaya, Selangor — 34.7 acres of land.

== Retail ==
- KL East Mall, situated in Ampang, Kuala Lumpur
- Elmina Lakeside Mall, situated in City of Elmina, Shah Alam, Selangor
