= Permodalan Nasional Berhad =

Malaysian investment company

Permodalan Nasional Berhad (PNB)
- Type: Government-owned investment company
- Industry: Investment
- Founded: 17 March 1978; 48 years ago
- Headquarters: Level 91, Menara Merdeka 118, Presint Merdeka 118, 50118 Kuala Lumpur, Malaysia
- Key people: YM Raja Arshad Raja Uda (Chairman); Rizal Rickman Ramli (President & Group Chief Executive (PGCE))
- Revenue: ▲RM 16.42 billion (2023); RM 14.53 billion (2022)
- Net income: ▲RM 13.04 billion (2023); RM 10.38 billion (2022)
- Total assets: ▼RM 337 billion (2023); RM 341.61 billion (2022)
- Number of employees: 1,500
- Subsidiaries: Sime Darby; S P Setia; UMW Holdings; Malaysian Re; PROLINTAS; Malaysian Industrial Development Finance (MIDF)
- Website: pnb.com.my

Permodalan Nasional Berhad (PNB) is a state-owned Malaysian investment management company. One of the largest fund management companies in Malaysia, it was established on 17 March 1978 as one of the instruments of the government's New Economic Policy.

PNB's two notable projects are located in Kuala Lumpur. They are the megatall skyscraper Merdeka 118 on Jalan Hang Jebat, and the PNB 1194 Hotel (formerly MAS Building) on Jalan Sultan Ismail.

In June 2023, PNB announced that it planned to move its corporate headquarters from PNB Tower, Jalan Tun Razak, where it had operated since 1985, to Merdeka 118 by the year-end.

== Leadership ==
=== Chairpersons ===
- Ismail Mohamed Ali (1978–1996)
- Ahmad Sarji Abdul Hamid (1996–2016)
- Abdul Wahid Omar (2016–2018)
- Zeti Akhtar Aziz (2018–2021)
- Arifin Zakaria (2021–2023)
- YM Raja Arshad Raja Uda (2023–present)

=== Chief Executive Officers (CEOs) ===
- Desa Pachi (1978–1979)
- Khalid Ibrahim (1979–1994)
- Hilmey Taib (1995–1997)
- Hamad Kama Piah Che Othman (1998–2016)
- Abdul Rahman Ahmad (2016–2019)
- Abdul Jalil Abdul Rasheed (2019–2020)
- Ahmad Zulqarnain Onn (2020–2024)
- Abdul Rahman Ahmad (2024–2026)
- Rizal Rickman Ramli (2026–present)

== Subsidiaries ==
- Amanah Saham Nasional Berhad (ASNB)
- Pelaburan Hartanah Nasional Berhad (PHNB)
- Property Management Services Sdn Bhd (PMSSB)
- PNB Commercial Sdn Berhad (PNBC)
- PNB Development Sdn Bhd (PNBD)
- PNB Merdeka Ventures Sdn Bhd (PNBMV)
- PNB Research Institute Sdn Bhd (PNBRi)
- Projek Lintasan Kota Holdings Sdn Bhd (Prolintas)
