= Michael Frese =

German psychologist

- Born: Munich, Germany
- Education: Free University of Berlin
- Known for: Error management theory Action Theory; Personal initiative
- Awards: Global Award for Entrepreneurship Research (2024)
- Scientific career
- Fields: Psychology; Management; Organizational behaviour
- Workplaces: Asia School of Business; Leuphana University of Lüneburg

Michael Frese is a German psychologist specializing in work and organizational psychology, organizational behavior, and entrepreneurship research. He is Distinguished Professor and Faculty Chair at the Asia School of Business and holds a professorship at Leuphana University of Lüneburg. Frese's research has addressed stress at work, error management in organizations, personal initiative and proactive behavior, innovation and leadership, and the psychology of entrepreneurship.

== Education and career ==
Frese completed his Master of Science degree in psychology at the Free University of Berlin. After his studies, he worked as a scientific assistant at the chair for educational and social sciences at the Technical University of Berlin, where he received his doctorate in 1978.

Frese began his academic career as a visiting professor at the University of Bremen In 1980, and from 1981 until 1983 at the University of Pennsylvania. In 1984, Frese received a professorship for work psychology at LMU Munich. From 1991 to 2009, he held the chair for work and organizational psychology at Justus Liebig University Giessen. In the period from 1995 to 2000, he also held a chair at the University of Amsterdam.

Frese has held a dual appointment at Leuphana University of Lüneburg since 2009. From 2009 to 2020, he was affiliated with the Business School at the National University of Singapore, where he served as Head of Department and was appointed to the Provost’s Chair in 2016.

In 2020, while still serving as a visiting professor at the National University of Singapore, Frese took up a position as professor of management and entrepreneurship at the Asia School of Business. In 2025, he was appointed Distinguished Professor and Faculty Chair and became PhD Program Director.

== Awards and honors ==
Frese served as president of the International Association of Applied Psychology from 2002 to 2006.

In 2013, Frese was elected a fellow of the German National Academy of Sciences Leopoldina. He was subsequently elected a fellow of the International Association of Applied Psychology in 2014, the Academy of Management (2014), and the Society for Industrial and Organizational Psychology.

=== Awards ===
- Distinguished Scientific Contributions Award, Society for Industrial and Organizational Psychology (2015)
- Dedication to Entrepreneurship Award, Academy of Management (2016)
- Joyce and Robert Hogan Award for Personality and Work Performance, Society for Industrial and Organizational Psychology (2016, 2023)
- Distinguished Scientific Contributions Award, International Association of Applied Psychology (2018)
- Lifetime Achievement Award, Academy of Management (2021)
- Global Award for Entrepreneurship Research (2024)
