= The Iclif Leadership and Governance Centre =

- Formation: 2003
- Type: Not-for-profit, executive education
- Location: Kuala Lumpur, Malaysia
- Board of directors: Dr. Zeti Akhtar Aziz (Chairman); Megat Zaharuddin; Shaik Abdul Rasheed Bin Abdul Ghaffour
- Website: iclif.org

The Iclif Leadership and Governance Centre (Iclif) is a non-profit organisation in Kuala Lumpur, Malaysia, dedicated to executive education, research, coaching, and advisory services in the areas of leadership development and corporate governance.

== Background ==
Iclif was created and funded by Bank Negara Malaysia (The Central Bank of Malaysia) in 2003 as an independent non-profit organisation. In 2010, It received a significant funding boost from Bank Negara to RM800mil. Iclif's goal is to provide practical and relevant executive development and advisory services in Malaysia and globally across industry and government sectors. In 2017, it was reportedly the only organisation in the region that focused both on leadership and corporate governance.

Iclif has international faculty members who come from well regarded academic institutions and Fortune 500 companies. They are mostly based in Asia and conduct applied research in the Asian world.

Originally, Iclif was focused on the financial services industry in Malaysia. As national and global economies became more connected, Iclif has since expanded into additional economic sectors.

In 2020, The Iclif Leadership and Governance Centre merged with the Asia School of Business, forming the ASB Iclif Executive Education Center (Iclif). The mission of Iclif is to provide a broader set of business education offerings to the region and beyond, offered through in-person and online modes.

== Programs ==
Iclif promotes leadership development and corporate governance, although it has evolved beyond its initial charter to conduct programs for Malaysian financial institutions only. It now conducts programs for all corporations in Malaysia and neighboring countries, including Indonesia, Thailand, Singapore, Hong Kong, India, and the Middle East. It also offers custom-built programs to help organizations close knowledge gaps.

Iclif publishes Asia-related research used to develop targeted programs and advisory services. Some notable research efforts include interviews with executives to explore leadership and motivation challenges, employee interviews across the Asia-Pacific region to study expectations of leaders and their effectiveness, studies of leadership energy, and employee engagement research.

The organization also hosts leadership summits and conferences in Asia.
