= Islamic Financial Services Board =

International standard-setting body for Islamic financial services

- Abbreviation: IFSB
- Formation: November 3, 2002; 23 years ago in Malaysia.
- Type: Independent international not-for-profit organization
- Purpose: Sets standards for regulatory and supervisory agencies of the Islamic financial services industry
- Headquarters: Kuala Lumpur, Malaysia
- Location: Level 5, Sasana Kijang, Bank Negara Malaysia 2, Jalan Dato' Onn, Kuala Lumpur, 50480
- Region served: Worldwide
- Members: 180
- Official language: English, Arabic
- Secretary-General: Bello Lawal Danbatta
- Main organ: General Assembly
- Staff: 11-50
- Website: ifsb.org

The Islamic Financial Services Board (IFSB) is an international standard-setting body of regulatory and supervisory agencies that aims to promote the soundness and stability of Islamic financial services. It studies and recommends standards consistent with Sharî'ah principles to financial institutions covering the areas of banking, capital market and insurance.

The IFSB was originally established to serve banking sector regulators and central banks, extending its mandate to include supervisors and regulators of insurance and securities markets in 2004 and 2005 respectively.

== History ==
The IFSB was founded by "a consortium of central banks" and the Islamic Development Bank in 2002 and began operations on 10 March 2003. The country of its location, Malaysia, passed a special law the same year —the Islamic Financial Services Board Act 2002—giving the IFSB the usual "immunities and privileges" international organizations receive.

The Nine Founding Members that signed the Articles of Agreement on 3 November 2002 are the following:

1. Central Bank of Bahrain (formerly known as Bahrain Monetary Authority)
2. Bank Indonesia
3. Central Bank of the Islamic Republic of Iran
4. Central Bank of Kuwait
5. Bank Negara Malaysia
6. State Bank of Pakistan
7. Saudi Arabian Monetary Agency
8. Central Bank of Sudan (formerly known as Bank of Sudan)
9. Islamic Development Bank

In its 15th Meeting held on 23 November 2009 in Kuala Lumpur, Malaysia, the Council of the IFSB resolved to establish the Islamic Financial Stability Forum as a platform for the IFSB member countries to discuss issues relating to the financial stability of the Islamic financial services industry. Prominent industry experts, senior leadership of national and international institutions and thought leaders have presented their papers at the Islamic Financial Stability Forum.

== Mission ==
The mission of the IFSB is to promote the stability and resilience of the Islamic financial services industry. The IFSB seeks to achieve its mission through the issuance, and facilitating the implementation, of global and prudential and supervisory standards and other initiatives that foster knowledge sharing and cooperation.

== Membership ==
As of June 2020, the 187 members of the IFSB comprise 79 regulatory and supervisory authorities, 9 international inter-governmental organisations, and 99 market players (financial institutions, professional firms, industry associations and stock exchanges) operating in 57 jurisdictions.

== Standards and Guiding Principles, Technical Notes and Guidance Notes ==
As of October 2020, the IFSB has issued 32 Standards & Guiding Principles, Technical Notes and Guiding Principles for various sectors of Islamic financial services industry.

== See also ==
- Islamic banking and finance
- Accounting and Auditing Organization for Islamic Financial Institutions
