= Economy of Malaysia =

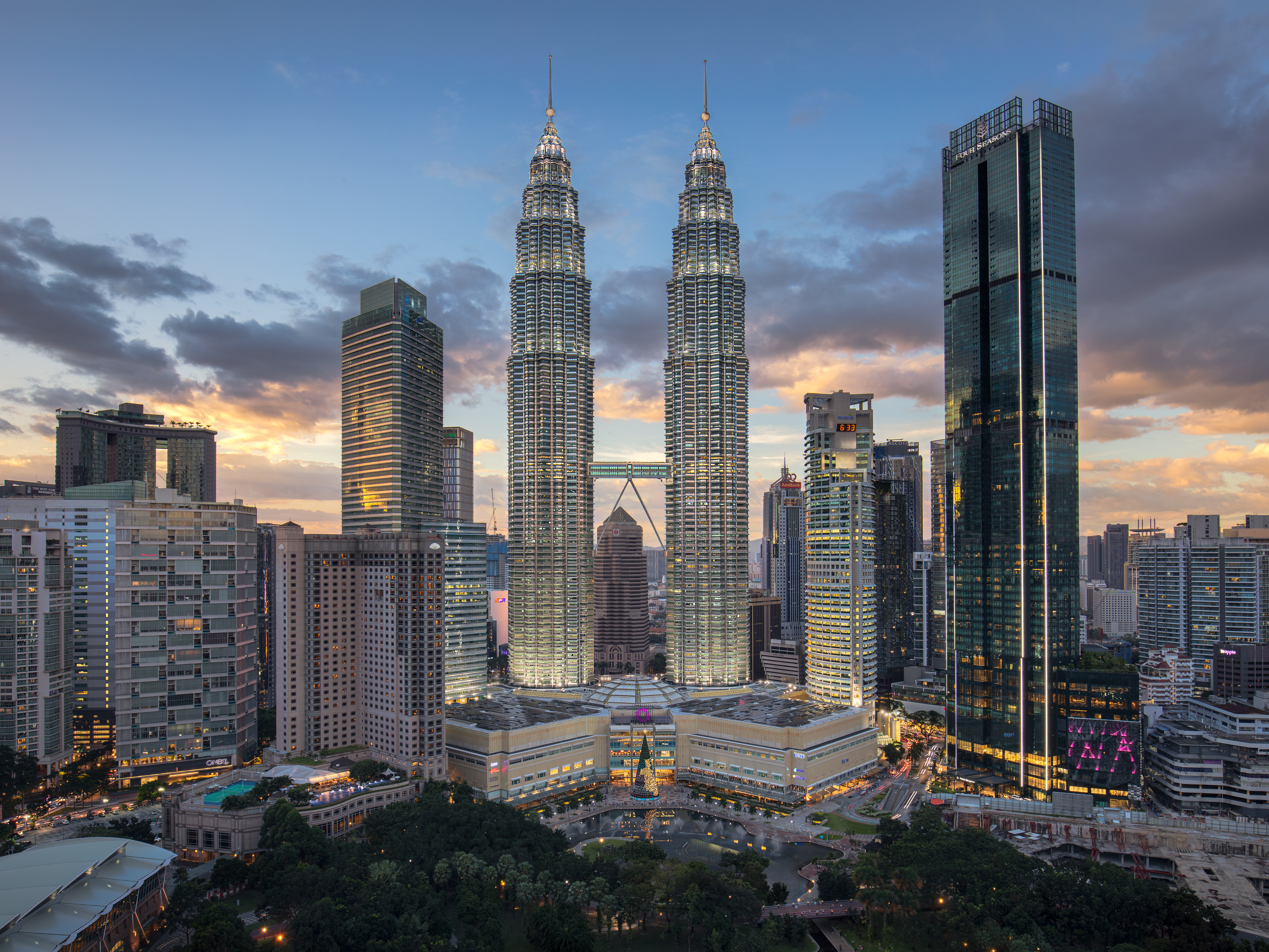
- Kuala Lumpur, Malaysia's capital city and the country's major financial hub.
- Currency: Ringgit (MYR, RM)
- Fiscal year: Calendar year
- Trade organisations: APEC, ASEAN, IOR-ARC, WTO, JETRO, RCEP, CPTPP, EAS, AFTA
- Country group: Upper-middle income economy; Newly industrialised country

Statistics
- Population: ▲34,400,000 (2026)
- GDP: ▲$547.1 billion (nominal; 2026 est.); ▲$1.620 trillion (PPP; 2026 est.)
- GDP rank: 33th (nominal; 2026); 28th (PPP; 2026)
- GDP growth: 5.1% (2024); 5.2% (2025)
- GDP per capita: ▲$15,980 (nominal; 2026 est.); ▲$47,450 (PPP; 2026 est.)
- GDP per capita rank: 69th (nominal; 2026); 50th (PPP; 2026)
- GDP per capita growth: 5.2% (2026 est.)
- GDP by sector: agriculture: ▲7.7%; industry: ▲37.7%; services: ▼53.5%; (2023 est.)
- GDP by component: Household consumption: 60.4%; Government consumption: 12.0%; Investment in fixed capital: 19.2%; Investment in inventories: 3.3%; Exports of goods and services: 68.4%; Imports of goods and services: -63.4%; (2023 est.)
- Inflation (CPI): ▼1.9% (June 2026)
- Population below national poverty line: 5.1% (2024 est.); 1.2% on less than $6.85/day (2025)
- Gini coefficient: 39.0 medium (2024)
- Human Development Index: ▲0.819 very high (2023) (58th); ▲0.707 high IHDI (2023, 59th)
- Corruption Perceptions Index: 52 out of 100 points (2025, 54th rank)
- Labour force: ▲17.61 million (2025); 75.1% employment rate (2024)
- Labour force by occupation: agriculture: 10.0%; industry: 28.13%; services: 61.87%; (2022)
- Unemployment: ▼2.9% (2025)
- Average gross salary: RM8,000/ $1,958 monthly (2026)
- Main industries: Electronics, semiconductors, microchips, integrated circuits, rubber, oleochemicals, automotive, optical devices, pharmaceuticals, medical equipment, smelting, timber, wood pulp, Islamic finance, petroleum, liquified natural gas, petrochemicals, telecommunications

External
- Exports: $345 billion (2025); $340 billion (2024)
- Export goods: Electrical & electronic products, palm oil & palm oil based agriculture products, petroleum products, chemicals & chemical products, machinery, equipment & parts, manufactures of metal, optical & scientific equipment, liquified natural gas, palm oil-based manufactured products, processed food
- Main export partners: Singapore 17.38%; United States 14.60%; China 13.30%; Hong Kong 6.77%; Japan 5.91%; (2025)
- Imports: $314.3 billion (2025)
- Import goods: Electrical & electronic products, petroleum products, machinery, equipment & parts, chemicals & chemical products, manufactures of metal, crude petroleum, transport equipment, processed food, optical & scientific equipment, iron & steel products
- Main import partners: China 30.29%; Singapore 16.18%; United States 14.18%; Taiwan 13.86%; Japan 10.23%; (2025)
- FDI stock: ▲$234 billion (2024 est.)
- Current account: ▲$13.148 billion (2024)
- Gross external debt: ▲$319 billion (2024 est.)

Public finance
- Government debt: ▼66.86% of GDP (2024)
- Foreign reserves: ▲US$124.1 billion (November 2024)
- Budget balance: ▼ −4.36% of GDP (2024)
- Revenue: 66.44 billion (2024 est.)
- Spending: 104 billion (2025 est.)
- Economic aid: $4.4 billion (2025 est.)
- Credit rating: Standard & Poor's: A−; Outlook: Stable; Moody's: A3; Outlook: Stable; Fitch: BBB+; Outlook: Stable
- All values, unless otherwise stated, are in US dollars.

Malaysia has an upper-middle income, newly industrialised, developing economy, which is relatively open and state oriented. It ranks as the 34th largest in the world in terms of nominal GDP and 28th largest by purchasing power parity (PPP). It has a labour workforce of 17.51 million with the labour productivity of Malaysian workers being the 62nd highest in the world and significantly higher than China, Indonesia, Vietnam, and the Philippines. Using GDP per hour worked (GDP constant 2021 international $ at PPP) in 2025 from International Labour Organisation statistic, when compared to its regional peers, a Malaysian worker is nearly 100% more productive than an average South East Asian worker, generating GDP output per hour at US$30.41 per Malaysian worker compared to US$15.57 per hour for an average South East Asian worker.

The Malaysian economy has developed vertical and horizontal integration across several export linked industries while capturing a significant global market share for manufactured products and commodities ranging from integrated circuit, semiconductor, and palm oil to liquefied natural gas.

Malaysia is the 35th most trade intensive economy globally; higher than countries such as Denmark, Norway, Germany, and Sweden with total trade activities at 132% of its GDP, while recording consistent trade surpluses since 1998. Its economy being highly robust and diversified, has achieved improved export value especially for high-tech products which made up around US$66 billions of the country's exports, the third highest in ASEAN. The country also exports the second largest volume and value of palm oil products globally, after Indonesia.

Malaysia holds a significant position in the global semiconductor market and was a major exporter of semiconductor devices in 2024. To support this position, the Malaysian government has announced a strategy targeting over US$100 billion in investment for its semiconductor industry, aiming to develop the country into a global manufacturing hub.

According to International Monetary Fund in the World Economic Outlook for July 2026, Malaysia is among the top four net exporter of artificial intelligence (AI) related hardware alongside Taiwan and South Korea. Malaysia has benefited from data center activity and the upturn in the global technology cycle. The country had attracted large foreign direct investment centred on the global AI boom with foreign technology companies like Google, Microsoft and ByteDance flocking to the country and investing US$2 billion, US$2.2 billion, and US$2.1 billion, respectively, to capitalise on Malaysia's competitive advantage in the data centre and hyperscale construction industries due to its highly educated workforce, cheap land acquisition, low water and electricity cost, and the absence of natural disasters. This is expected to consolidate Malaysia's position as a cloud computing hub for wider Asia, increasing its high value sector and propelling its economy to meet the governments high-income economy goal.

Positioning Malaysia as a business hub, it excels above similar income group peers in terms of business competitiveness and innovation. The Global Competitiveness Report (2026) ranks the Malaysian economy as the 15th most competitive in the world and the second most competitive in Southeast Asia after Singapore while Global Innovation Index (2024) ranks Malaysia as the 33rd most innovative nation globally.

Overall, Malaysians enjoy a relatively affluent lifestyle compared to many of its neighbours in Southeast Asia. This is due to a fast-growing export-oriented economy, a relatively low national income tax, highly affordable local food and transport fuel, with recent government initiatives such as reducing fuel prices further. Malaysians also benefit from a fully subsidized single-payer public healthcare system, with its health infrastructure contributing to fast-growing medical tourism rates.

== History ==
As one of three countries that control the Strait of Malacca, international trade plays a very significant role in Malaysia's economy. At one time, it was the largest producer of tin, rubber and palm oil in the world. Manufacturing has a large influence in the country's economy, accounting for over 40% of the GDP.

In the 1980s, Malaysia began to imitate the four Asian Tiger economies (Hong Kong, Singapore, South Korea, and Taiwan) and committed itself to a transition from being reliant on mining and agriculture to an economy that depends more on manufacturing. The predominantly mining and agricultural based Malaysian economy began a transition towards a more multi-sector economy. Since the 1980s the industrial sector has led Malaysia's growth. High levels of investment played a significant role in this. With Japanese investment, heavy industries flourished and within several years, Malaysian exports became the country's primary growth engine. Malaysia consistently achieved more than 7% GDP growth along with low inflation in the 1980s and the 1990s.

In 1991, Prime Minister Mahathir Mohamad outlined his idea, Vision 2020 in which Malaysia would become a self-sufficient industrialised nation by 2020. In 2013, Minister in the Prime Minister's Department Tan Sri Nor Mohamed Yakcop said Malaysia could attain developed country status in 2018 if the country's economic growth remains constant or increases. In 2023, the Malaysian government unveiled an industrial policy, the New Industrial Master Plan (NIMP) 2030, a guideline for the nation's manufacturing sector to grow and achieve macroeconomic targets, aiming for RM587.5 billion (from RM364.1 billion) contribution to Malaysia's GDP, 3.3 million (from 2.7 million) employed persons and a median salary of RM4,510 (from RM1,976) by 2030.

Malaysia experienced an economic expansion and underwent rapid development during the late 20th century and had a GDP per capita (nominal) of US$11,648.70 in 2023, and is considered a newly industrialised country. In 2009, the GDP (PPP) was US$378.5 billion and GDP per capita (PPP) was US$13,468.00, about one third of the 2023 figures.

In 2022, the Household Income Survey undertaken by the government indicated that there were 7.9 million households in Malaysia, with an average of 3.8 members in each household. In the latest Household Income Survey 2024, the mean monthly household income of Malaysia was RM9,155 with an annual growth rate of 3.8%. The federal territories, Selangor and Johor were the three regions with the highest average household income in Malaysia, all of them surpassed the threshold of RM10,000 that year.

According to a HSBC report in 2012, Malaysia is expected to become the world's 21st largest economy by 2050, with a GDP of $1.2 trillion (Year 2000 dollars) and a GDP per capita of $29,247 (Year 2000 dollars). The report also stated, "The electronic equipment, petroleum, and liquefied natural gas producer will see a substantial increase in income per capita. Malaysian life expectancy, relatively high level of schooling and above average fertility rate will help in its rapid expansion." Viktor Shvets, the managing director in Credit Suisse, has said "Malaysia has all the right ingredients to become a developed nation."

In early 2020, the Malaysian economy was severely afflicted by the COVID-19 pandemic that eventually expanded to the rest of the world, causing an economic shutdown and downturn in the country, the worst since 2008. In early December 2020 during the pandemic, Fitch Ratings downgraded the country's rating from A− to BBB+. Some, such as Hoo Ke Ping at the Kingsley Strategic Institute, suggested that this was because of a lack of communication between the new government and the ratings agency. Others, such as Carmelo Ferlito, from the Centre for Market Education, said it might require something more substantial as the recent budget lacked a strategy for the recovery as well as addressing the political tensions, and also, Shan Saeed at Juwai IQI suggested that the agency had lost its relevance as the analysis was "behind the curve". However, the COVID-19 recession in the country ended by 1 April 2022 as the COVID-19 Omicron infection rate continued to fall ahead of the endemic phase.

== Economic policies ==
=== Budget ===
In Malaysia, federal budgets are presented annually by the Government of Malaysia to identify proposed government revenues and spending and forecast economic conditions for the upcoming year, and its fiscal policy for the forward years. The federal budget includes the government's estimates of revenue and spending and may outline new policy initiatives. Federal budgets are usually released in October, before the start of the fiscal year. All of the Malaysian states also present budgets. Since state finances are dependent on money from the federal government, these budgets are usually released after the federal one.

The federal budget is a major state financial plan for the fiscal year, which has the force of law after its approval by the Malaysian parliament and signed into law by the Yang di-Pertuan Agong.

Revenue estimates detailed in the budget are raised through the Malaysian taxation system, with government spending representing a sizeable proportion of the overall economy. Besides presenting the government's expected revenues and expenditures, the federal budget is also a political statement of the government's intentions and priorities, and has profound macroeconomic implications.

=== Monetary policy ===
Prior to the 1997 Asian Financial Crisis, the Malaysian Ringgit (MYR) was a floating currency that traded at RM2.50 at the dollar. As speculative activities spread across the region, the Ringgit fell to as much as RM4.10 to the dollar in matter of weeks.

An executive decision led by the then Prime Minister Mahathir Mohamad decided to peg the MYR to the dollar and impose capital controls to prevent excessive outflow of the Ringgit in the open market. The Ringgit became was pegged at RM3.80 to the US dollar and a traveller had to declare to the central bank if taking out more than RM10,000 out of the country and the Ringgit itself .

The fixed exchange rate was abandoned in favour of the floating exchange rate in July 2005, hours after China announced the same move. At this point, the Ringgit was still not internationalised. The Ringgit continued to strengthen to 3.18 to the dollar by March 2008 and appreciated as low as 2.94 to the dollar in May 2011. Meanwhile, many aspects of capital control have been slowly relaxed by Bank Negara Malaysia. However, the government continues to not internationalise the Ringgit. The government stated that the Ringgit will be internationalised once it is ready.

Bank Negara Malaysia for the time being, uses interest rate targeting. The Overnight Policy Rate (OPR) is their policy instrument, used to guide the short term interbank rates which is designed to target a desired inflation and economic growth rate.

=== Affirmative action ===
Tun Abdul Razak, who was then Prime Minister, implemented the affirmative action policy named as New Economic Policy (NEP) soon after 13 May Incident in 1969. Prior to the incident, the poverty rates among Malays were extremely high (65%) as was discontent between races, particularly towards the Chinese, who controlled 74% of the economy at the time. Through NEP, the Bumiputeras majority were given priority and special privileges in housing developments, scholarship admission and also for ownership of publicly listed companies.

The NEP was created in 1971 with the aim of bringing Malays a 30% share of the economy of Malaysia and eradicating poverty amongst Malays, primarily through encouraging enterprise ownership by Bumiputera's. After 40 years of the program, bumiputra equity ownership rose to 23% worth RM167.7 billion in 2010 against 2.4% in 1970.

The NEP was accused of creating an oligarchy, and creating a 'subsidy mentality'. Political parties such as Parti Keadilan Rakyat and Democratic Action Party proposed a new policy which will be equal for every Malaysian, regardless of race. When the Democratic Action Party was elected in the state of Penang in 2008, it announced that it would do away with the NEP, claiming that it "... breeds nepotism, corruption and systemic inefficiency".

Wolfgang Kasper, a professor of economics at University of New South Wales, and once an adviser to Malaysia's Finance Ministry, criticised the NEP, saying that "NEP handouts (are) making Malays lazy, corrupt & swell-headed. Worst of all, it keeps them poor." He also criticised the Federal Government giving cash-handouts and financial aid instead of providing equal access to education to help the marginalised poor to lift their income status.

On 21 April 2009, the prime minister Najib Tun Razak announced the liberalisation of 27 services sub-sector by abolishing the 30% bumiputera requirement. The move was seen as a government effort to increase investment in the service sector of the economy. According to the premier, many more sectors of the economy would be liberalised.

On 30 June 2009, the prime minister announced further liberation moves including the dismantling of the Bumiputera equity quotas and repealing the guidelines of the Foreign Investment Committee, which was responsible to monitor foreign shareholding in Malaysian companies. However, any Malaysian companies that wished to list in Malaysia would still need to offer 50 per cent of public shareholding spread to Bumiputera investors.

=== Subsidies and price controls ===
The Malaysian government subsidises and controls prices on many essential items to keep the prices low. Prices of items such as palm oil, cooking oil, petrol, flour, bread, rice and other essentials have been kept under market prices to keep cost of living low. As of 2022, government expenditure on subsidies stood at RM70.3 billion (US$15.96 billion), with fuel alone taking up RM52 billion (US$11.8 billion) or 74% of total subsidies.

Since 2010, the government has been gradually reforming Malaysia's subsidy system, via a series of reductions in subsidies for fuel and sugar to improve government finances and to improve economic efficiency. As a result, in December 2014, the government officially ended all fuel subsidies and implemented a 'managed float' system, taking advantage of low oil prices at the time, potentially saving the government almost RM20 billion ringgit (US$5.72 billion) annually.

On 10 June 2024, the Malaysian government ended the previously reimplementation of blanket subsidies on diesel fuel. Instead, a more selective, targeted subsidy was implemented, where cash assistance was directly disbursed to qualified individuals or fleet cards to eligible logistics vehicles. Plans for removal of petrol subsidies have yet to be announced but it is expected to take place in 2025. The withdrawal of said subsidies will target the top 15% of income earners, while the remaining 85% will continue to enjoy the status quo.

=== Sovereign wealth funds ===
The government owns and operates several sovereign wealth funds that invest in local companies and also foreign companies. One such fund is Khazanah Nasional Berhad, established in 1993, and as of 31 December 2023, had an asset size of RM126.2 billion (US$27.46 billion). The fund invests in major companies in Malaysia such as CIMB in the banking sector, UEM Group in the construction sector, Telekom Malaysia and Axiata in the communications industry, Malaysia Airports and Malaysia Airlines in the aerospace industry, as well as Tenaga Nasional in the energy sector

Another fund owned by the Malaysian government is the Employees Provident Fund, a retirement fund that as of 31 March 2024, had an asset size of RM1.19 trillion (US$251.61 billion), of which overseas investments account for 38% of total assets, making it the 4th largest pension fund in Asia and 13th largest in the world. Like Khazanah Nasional, EPF invests and owns several major companies in Malaysia such as RHB Bank. EPF investment is diversified over a number of sectors but almost 40% of their investment are in the services sector.

Permodalan Nasional Berhad is another major state investment fund controlled by the Malaysian Government. It offers capital guaranteed mutual funds such as Amanah Saham Bumiputera and Amanah Saham Wawasan 2020 which are open only to Malaysian and in some cases, Bumiputeras.

=== Government influence ===
Although the federal government promotes private enterprise and ownership in the economy, the economic direction of the country is heavily influenced by the government through five years development plans since independence. The economy is also influenced by the government through agencies such as the Economic Planning Unit and government-linked wealth funds such as Khazanah Nasional Berhad, Employees Provident Fund and Permodalan Nasional Berhad.

The government's development plans, called the Malaysian Plan, currently the Twelfth Malaysia Plan, started in 1950 during the British colonial rule. The plans were largely centred around accelerating the growth of the economy by selectively investing in sectors of the economy and building infrastructure to support said sectors. For example, in the current national plan, three primary aspects of the nation are being focused, consisting of strategies to energise and maintain economic empowerment, environmental sustainability and social reengineering.

Government-linked investment vehicles such as Khazanah Nasional Berhad, Employees Provident Fund and Permodalan Nasional Berhad invest in and own companies in major sectors of the Malaysian economy.

== Data ==
The following table shows the main economic indicators in 1980–2021 (with IMF staff estimates in 2022–2027). Inflation below 5% is in green.

Year	GDP (in Bil. US$PPP)	GDP per capita (in US$ PPP)	GDP (in Bil. US$nominal)	GDP per capita (in US$ nominal)	GDP growth (real)	Inflation rate (in Percent)	Unemployment (in Percent)	Government debt (in % of GDP)
1980	46.3	3,337.8	26.8	1,927.0	▲7.4%	▲6.7%	n/a	n/a
1981	▲54.3	▲3,813.0	▲27.3	▼1,920.1	▲6.9%	▲9.7%	n/a	n/a
1982	▲61.0	▲4,182.4	▲29.3	▲2,006.5	▲5.9%	▲5.8%	n/a	n/a
1983	▲67.4	▲4,505.6	▲32.7	▲2,189.6	▲6.3%	▲3.7%	n/a	n/a
1984	▲75.2	▲4,908.0	▲37.1	▲2,419.5	▲7.8%	▲3.9%	n/a	n/a
1985	▲76.9	▼4,862.0	▼34.1	▼2,154.5	▼-0.9%	▲2.6%	6.9%	n/a
1986	▲79.4	▲4,883.2	▼30.3	▼1,864.0	▲1.2%	▲0.4%	▲8.3%	n/a
1987	▲85.7	▲5,139.6	▲34.5	▲2,070.0	▲5.4%	▲0.7%	▼8.2%	n/a
1988	▲97.6	▲5,708.0	▲37.8	▲2,213.9	▲9.9%	▲0.3%	▼8.1%	n/a
1989	▲110.6	▲6,316.4	▲41.7	▲2,380.5	▲9.1%	▲2.6%	▼6.7%	n/a
1990	▲125.1	▲6,846.2	▲47.2	▲2,585.8	▲9.0%	▲3.0%	▼5.1%	74.1%
1991	▲141.6	▲7,636.5	▲53.5	▲2,885.1	▲9.5%	▲4.3%	▼4.3%	▼67.3%
1992	▲157.7	▲8,272.5	▲64.5	▲3,380.2	▲8.9%	▲4.8%	▼3.7%	▼59.1%
1993	▲177.5	▲9,053.0	▲72.9	▲3,717.4	▲9.9%	▲3.5%	▼3.0%	▼51.1%
1994	▲197.9	▲9,827.3	▲81.1	▲4,028.4	▲9.2%	▲3.7%	▼2.9%	▼43.7%
1995	▲222.0	▲10,731.8	▲96.6	▲4,672.1	▲9.8%	▲3.5%	▲3.1%	▼38.2%
1996	▲248.6	▲11,715.0	▲109.9	▲5,176.3	▲10.0%	▲3.5%	▼2.5%	▼32.8%
1997	▲271.4	▲12,469.0	▼108.8	▼4,997.0	▲7.3%	▲2.7%	▼2.4%	▼29.6%
1998	▼254.3	▼11,386.4	▼78.6	▼3,520.9	▼-7.4%	▲5.3%	▲3.2%	▲33.6%
1999	▲273.7	▲11,946.7	▲86.2	▲3,762.8	▲6.1%	▲2.7%	▲3.4%	▲34.4%
2000	▲304.2	▲12,945.8	▲102.1	▲4,347.7	▲8.7%	▲1.6%	▼3.1%	▼32.5%
2001	▲312.6	▲12,959.3	▼101.1	▼4,189.1	▲0.5%	▲1.4%	▲3.7%	▲38.1%
2002	▲334.6	▲13,532.2	▲109.8	▲4,441.8	▲5.4%	▲1.8%	▼3.5%	▲39.5%
2003	▲361.0	▲14,256.3	▲120.0	▲4,740.3	▲5.8%	▲1.1%	▲3.6%	▲41.4%
2004	▲395.8	▲15,278.8	▲135.9	▲5,244.9	▲6.8%	▲1.4%	▼3.6%	▲42.0%
2005	▲428.5	▲16,184.8	▲150.4	▲5,678.7	▲5.0%	▲3.0%	3.6%	▼40.8%
2006	▲466.4	▲17,383.1	▲170.5	▲6,355.0	▲5.6%	▲3.6%	▼3.3%	▼39.7%
2007	▲509.2	▲18,789.4	▲202.9	▲7,485.9	▲6.3%	▲2.0%	▼3.2%	▼39.3%
2008	▲544.0	▲19,711.4	▲242.1	▲8,771.0	▲4.8%	▲5.4%	▲3.3%	▲39.4%
2009	▼539.2	▼19,202.1	▼212.0	▼7,550.3	▼-1.5%	▲0.6%	▲3.7%	▲50.4%
2010	▲586.8	▲20,525.5	▲258.8	▲9,054.1	▲7.5%	▲1.7%	▼3.3%	▲51.2%
2011	▲630.7	▲21,701.7	▲302.6	▲10,413.7	▲5.3%	▲3.2%	▼3.1%	▲51.9%
2012	▲677.6	▲22,963.3	▲319.2	▲10,815.1	▲5.5%	▲1.7%	▼3.0%	▲53.8%
2013	▲701.7	▲23,224.6	▲328.1	▲10,858.4	▲4.7%	▲2.1%	▲3.1%	▲55.7%
2014	▲745.4	▲24,273.0	▲343.1	▲11,172.4	▲6.0%	▲3.1%	▼2.9%	▼55.4%
2015	▲750.8	▼24,074.1	▼301.4	▼9,663.3	▲5.0%	▲2.1%	▲3.2%	▲57.0%
2016	▲783.9	▲24,779.9	▲301.9	▼9,544.2	▲4.5%	▲2.1%	▲3.5%	▼55.8%
2017	▲829.3	▲25,897.2	▲319.2	▲9,969.5	▲5.8%	▲3.8%	▼3.4%	▼54.4%
2018	▲890.2	▲27,491.3	▲359.0	▲11,086.1	▲4.8%	▲1.0%	▼3.3%	▲55.6%
2019	▲946.1	▲29,091.6	▲365.3	▲11,231.5	▲4.4%	▲0.7%	3.3%	▲57.1%
2020	▼904.6	▼27,760.7	▼337.6	▼10,361.3	▼-5.5%	▲-1.1%	▲4.5%	▲67.7%
2021	▲971.3	▲29,702.4	▲373.0	▲11,407.7	▲3.1%	▲2.5%	▲4.7%	▲69.0%
2022	▲1,096.5	▲33,112.7	▲434.1	▲13,107.9	▲5.4%	▲3.2%	▼4.5%	▲69.6%
2023	▲1,185.3	▲35,353.6	▲467.5	▲13,942.6	▲4.4%	▲2.8%	▼4.3%	▲70.0%
2024	▲1,269.7	▲37,416.1	▲503.1	▲14,826.0	▲4.9%	▲2.4%	▼4.2%	70.0%
2025	▲1,350.5	▲39,335.8	▲539.6	▲15,717.8	▲4.4%	▲2.4%	4.2%	▲70.2%
2026	▲1,437.2	▲41,395.7	▲577.2	▲16,623.9	▲4.4%	▲2.4%	4.2%	70.2%
2027	▲1,522.7	▲43,387.1	▲615.0	▲17,523.6	▲3.9%	▲2.5%	4.2%	▲70.6%

== Currency ==
The only legal tender in Malaysia is the Malaysian ringgit. As of December 2025, the ringgit traded at MYR 4.12 to the US dollar. This was a significant change from the rate of MYR 4.80 to the dollar recorded in February 2024, an appreciation of 16.5%.

The ringgit is not internationalised. Since September 1998, due to the 1997 Asian financial crisis in which then Prime Minister Mahathir Mohamad imposed capital controls on the currency, due to speculative short-selling of the ringgit. Due to a series of capital controls, the currency was pegged between September 1998 and July 2005 at MYR 3.80 to the dollar after dropping from MYR 2.50 to the dollar, and at one point, MYR 4.80 to the dollar.

In recent years, Bank Negara Malaysia has begun to relax certain rules on capital controls, although the currency itself is still not traded internationally. According to the Bank Governor, the ringgit will be internationalised when it is ready.

In September 2010, in an interview with CNBC, Dato' Seri Najib Tun Razak, who was then Prime Minister of Malaysia and also held the position of Finance Minister, said that the government was open to enabling the ringgit to offshore trading if the move would help the economy. He added that before such a move could be made, it would ensure that rules and regulation were in place to avoid abuse of the currency.

== Natural resources ==
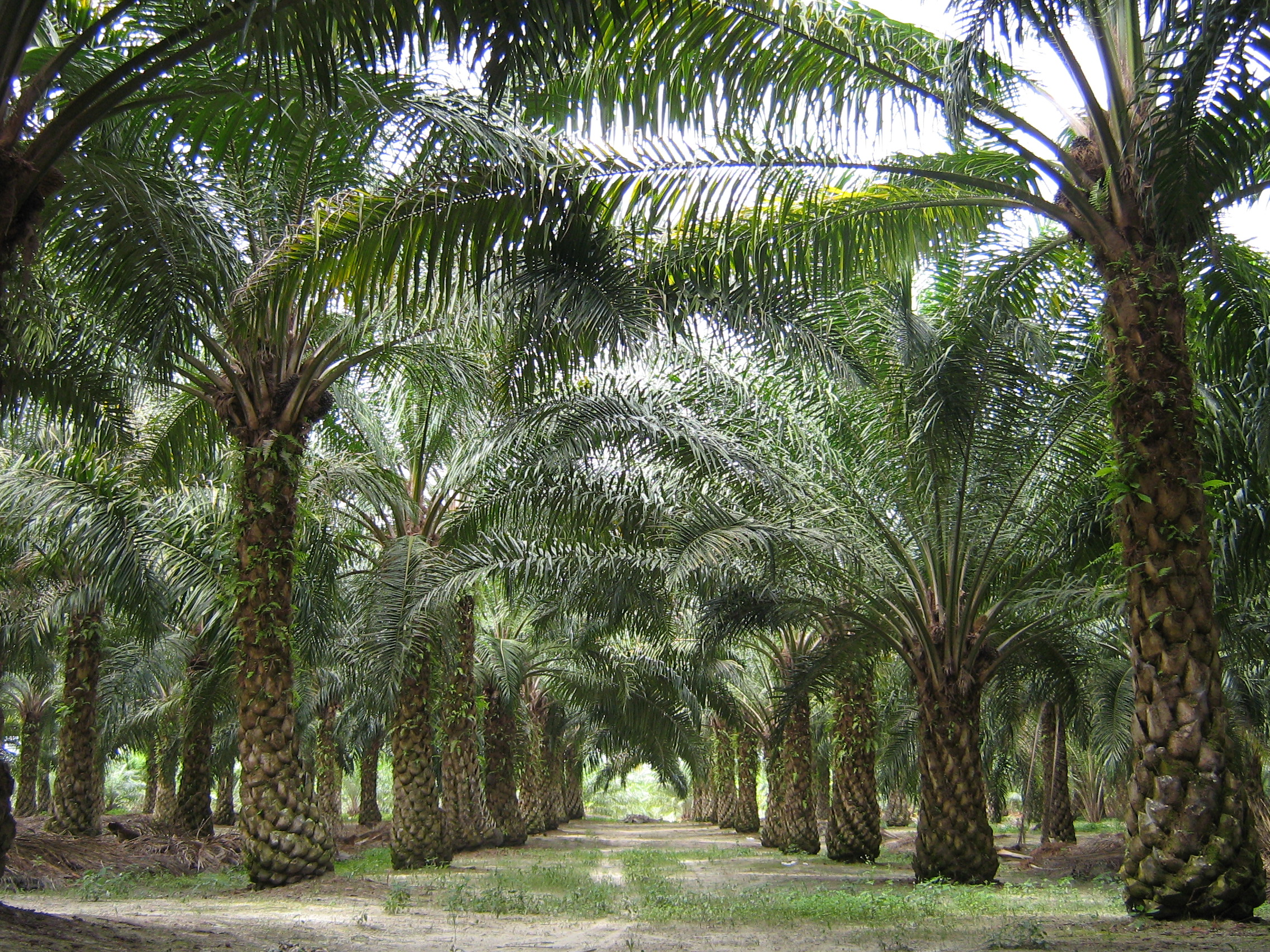
Palm oil estate in Malaysia.

Malaysia is well-endowed with natural resources in areas such as agriculture, forestry and minerals. It is an exporter of natural and agricultural resources, the most valuable exported resource being petroleum. In the agricultural sector, Malaysia is one of the top exporters of natural rubber and palm oil, which together with timber and timber products, cocoa, pepper, pineapple and tobacco dominate the growth of the sector. As of 2023, the percentage arable land in Malaysia was 9.7%. Croplands consists of 17.49% while other land uses consists of 77.07%. As of 2009, irrigated land covered 3,800 km^{2}. Total renewable water resources made up 580 cubic km as of 2011.

Tin and petroleum are the two main mineral resources that are of major significance in the Malaysian economy. Malaysia was once the world's largest producer of tin until the collapse of the tin market in the early 1980s. In the 19th and 20th century, tin played a predominant role in the Malaysian economy, with Malaysia accounting for over 31% of global output. It was only in 1972 that petroleum and natural gas took over from tin as the mainstay of the mineral extraction sector. Other minerals of some importance or significance include copper, bauxite, iron-ore and coal together with industrial minerals like clay, kaolin, silica, limestone, barite, phosphates and dimension stones such as granite as well as marble blocks and slabs. Small quantities of gold are produced.

In 2019, the country was the 11th largest world producer of manganese; the 11th largest world producer of tin, the 12th largest world producer of bauxite, and the 19th largest world producer of lime.

=== Energy resources ===
Malaysia held probable and proven oil reserves of 6.9 billion barrels as of January 2022, the fourth-highest reserves in Asia-Pacific after China, India, and Vietnam. Nearly all of Malaysia's oil comes from offshore fields. The continental shelf is divided into three producing basins: the basin offshore Eastern Peninsular Malaysia in the west and the Sarawak and Sabah basins in the east. Most of the country's oil reserves are located in the Peninsular basin and tend to be light and sweet crude. Malaysia's benchmark crude oil, Tapis Blend, is a light and sweet crude oil, with an API gravity of 42.7° and a sulphur content of 0.04% by weight.

At the end of 2023, Malaysia had proven natural gas reserves of 32 trillion cubic feet (Tcf). Although lower than the 2014 peak of 101 Tcf, reserves have increased since 2018 as a result of new discoveries. More than half of the country's natural gas reserves are located in its eastern areas, predominantly offshore Sarawak. Most of Malaysia's gas reserves are associated with oil basins, although Sarawak and Sabah have an increasing amount of non-associated gas reserves that have offset some of the declines from mature oil and gas basins offshore Peninsular Malaysia.

== Business environment ==
In 2025, Malaysia's economy was one of the most competitive in the world, ranking 23rd in the world and 8th for countries with a population of over 20 million, higher than countries like the United Kingdom and South Korea.

In the same year, Malaysia was the third most attractive country for foreign investors, ranked in the Baseline Profitability Index (BPI) published by Foreign Policy Magazine.

The government is moving towards a more business friendly environment by setting up a special task force to facilitate business called PEMUDAH, which means "simplifier" in Malay. Highlights includes easing restrictions and requirement to hire expatriates, shorten time to do land transfers and increasing the limit of sugar storage (a controlled item in Malaysia) for companies.

Malaysia was additionally ranked 34th in the Global Innovation Index in 2025, and second within the upper-middle income bracket, behind China.

== Corruption ==
According to a 2013 public survey by Transparency International, a majority of the surveyed households perceived corruption in Malaysia to be a significant problem. A quarter of the surveyed households consider the government's efforts in the fight against corruption to be ineffective. Corruption in Malaysia generally involves political connections still playing an important role in the outcome of public tenders.

Government contracts are sometimes awarded to well-connected companies, and the policies of awarding huge infrastructure projects to selected Bumiputera companies without open tender continue to exist.

In February 2016, Malaysia made an appearance in Time Magazine with the dubious distinction of being among a list of five countries whose corruption scandals are being highlighted. The magazine zoomed in on the 1Malaysia Development Berhad scandal (1MDB) and Prime Minister Najib Razak's corruption.

On 28 July 2020, Najib was convicted on seven counts of abuse of power, money laundering and criminal breach of trust by a Malaysian High Court in relation to the 1MDB scandal. He was sentenced to 12 years' imprisonment and fined RM210 million.

== Poverty and income inequality ==
Poverty in Malaysia is a controversial economic issue. The definition of poverty and the poverty line for Malaysians has been disputed, and government policies to address poverty such as the Malaysian New Economic Policy have been met with political protest.

Malaysia's total population is 31 million as of 2015, of which 0.6% live below the national poverty line. Malaysia has grown rapidly in terms of economic development. An indicator is that in 2014, 65.6% of the population aged 15 years and above were employed.

== Taxation ==
In 2016, the Inland Revenue Board of Malaysia lowered the effective tax rate to 24% for businesses with capital exceeding RM2.5 million (approximately US$550,000). For smaller companies, the rate was 15%.

The Malaysian government also imposes government taxes such as the Sales and Services tax (SST) and real estate taxes. The current rate of SST is at 6% while disposal of property is subject to a schedule of period holding the property.

=== Statistics ===
Year	Goods exports (billion US$)	Goods imports (in billion US$)	Net trade (in billion US$)
2023	▲$231.4	▲$201.5	▲$30.0
2020	▲$186.1	▲$153.2	▲$32.8
2015	▲$174.6	▲$146.7	▲$27.9
2010	▲$187.3	▲$148.9	▲$28.4
2005	▲$141.6	▲$108.7	▲$33.0
2000	▲$98.2	▲$77.5	▲$20.7
1990	▲$28.8	▲$26.3	▲$2.5
1980	▲$13.0	▲$10.6	▲$2.3
1975	$3.8	$3.6	▲$0.2

== Agriculture sector ==
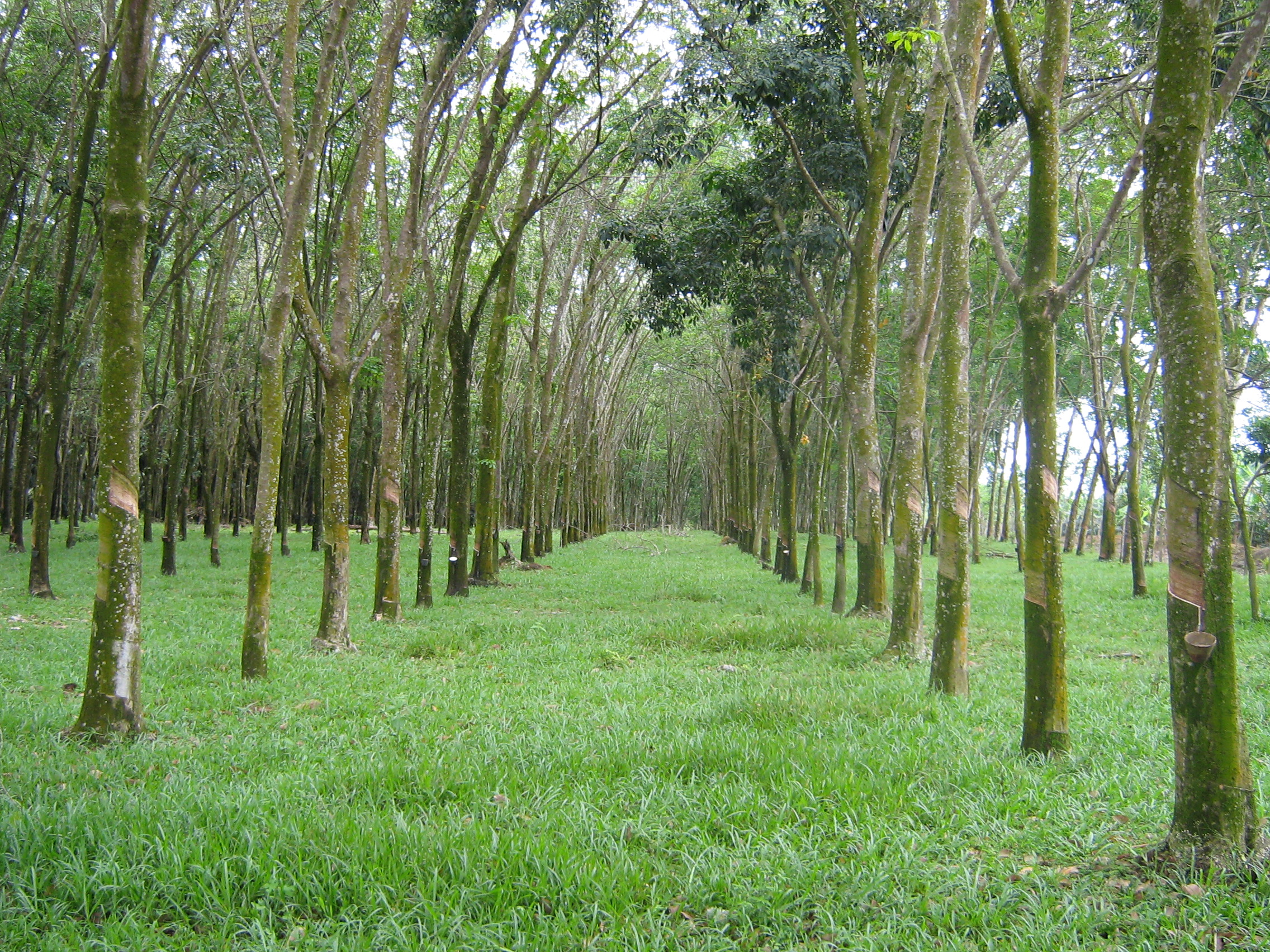
Rubber plantation in Malaysia

Agriculture is now a minor sector of the Malaysian economy, accounting for 7.1% of Malaysia's GDP in 2014 and employing 11.1% of Malaysia's labour force, contrasting with the 1960s when agriculture accounted for 37% of Malaysia's GDP and employed 66.2% of the labour force. The crops grown by the agricultural sector has also significantly shifted from food crops like paddy and coconut to industrial crops like palm oil and rubber, which in 2005 contributed to 83.7% of total agricultural land use, compared to 68.5% in 1960.

=== Palm Oil ===
Despite its minor contribution to Malaysia's GDP, Malaysia has a significant foothold in the world's agricultural sector, being the world's second largest producer of palm oil in 2012 producing 18.79 million tonnes of crude palm oil on roughly 5,000,000 hectares (19,000 sq mi) of land. Though Indonesia produces more palm oil, Malaysia is the world's largest exporter of palm oil having exported 18 million tonnes of palm oil products in 2011.

In March 2019, the European Commission concluded that palm oil cultivation results in excessive deforestation and its use in transport fuel should be phased out by 2030. In response, Mahathir Mohamad alleged that the European Union is at risk of starting a trade war with Malaysia regarding its "grossly unfair" policies geared towards decreasing the use of palm oil, which Mahathir stated was "unfair" and an example of "rich people...[trying] to impoverish poor people".

In July 2024, Hong Wai Onn from the Research Institute for Sustainable Excellence and Leadership asserted that the European Union's classification of palm oil as a high indirect land use change (ILUC) risk biofuel is flawed. He called for a reevaluation of ILUC factors to ensure more accurate carbon intensity measurements. He argued that ignoring this issue unfairly limits palm oil's potential as a low ILUC-risk biofuel and its role in supporting global climate efforts.

=== Rubber ===
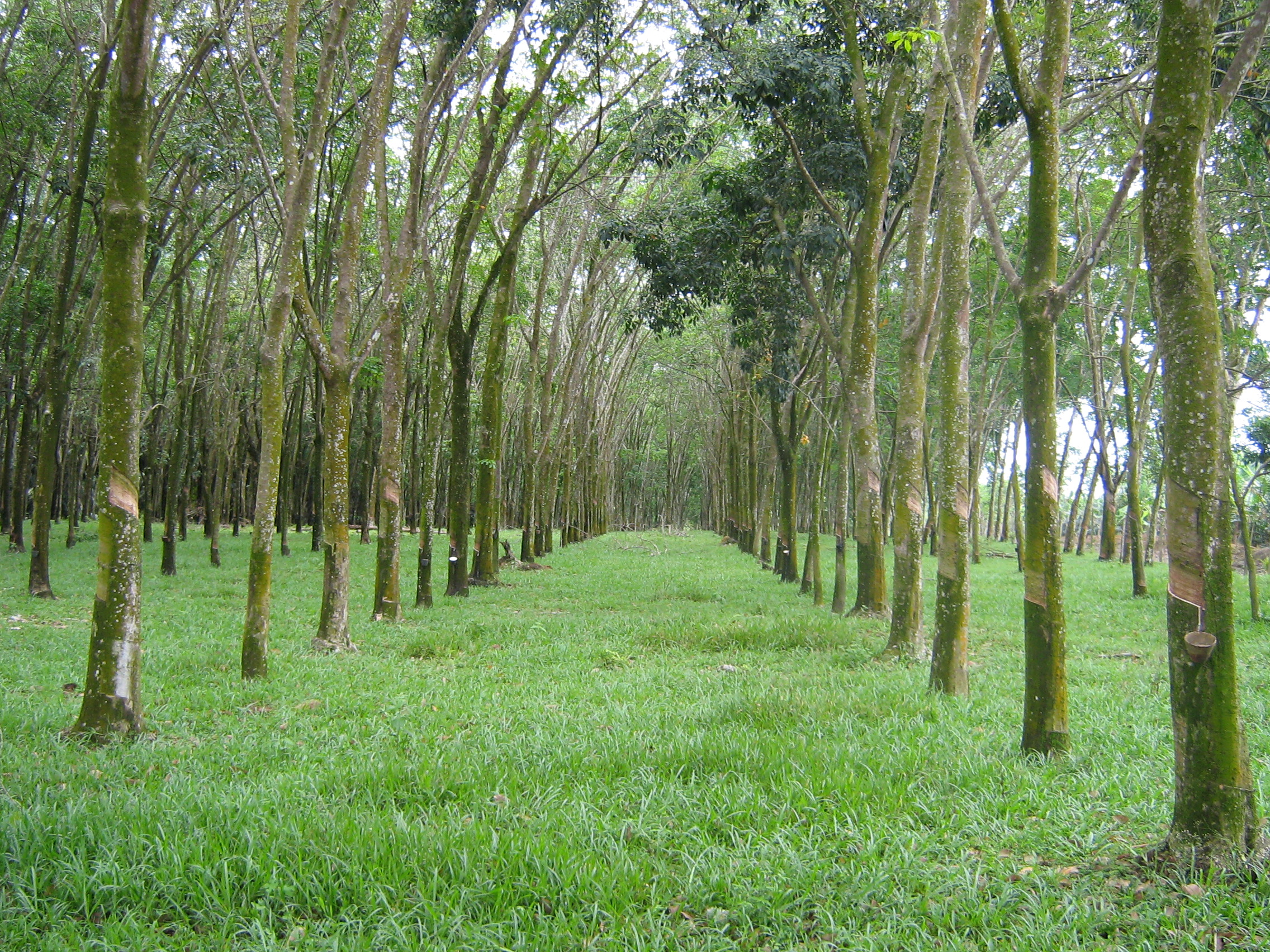
Rubber Tree Farm, Malaysia

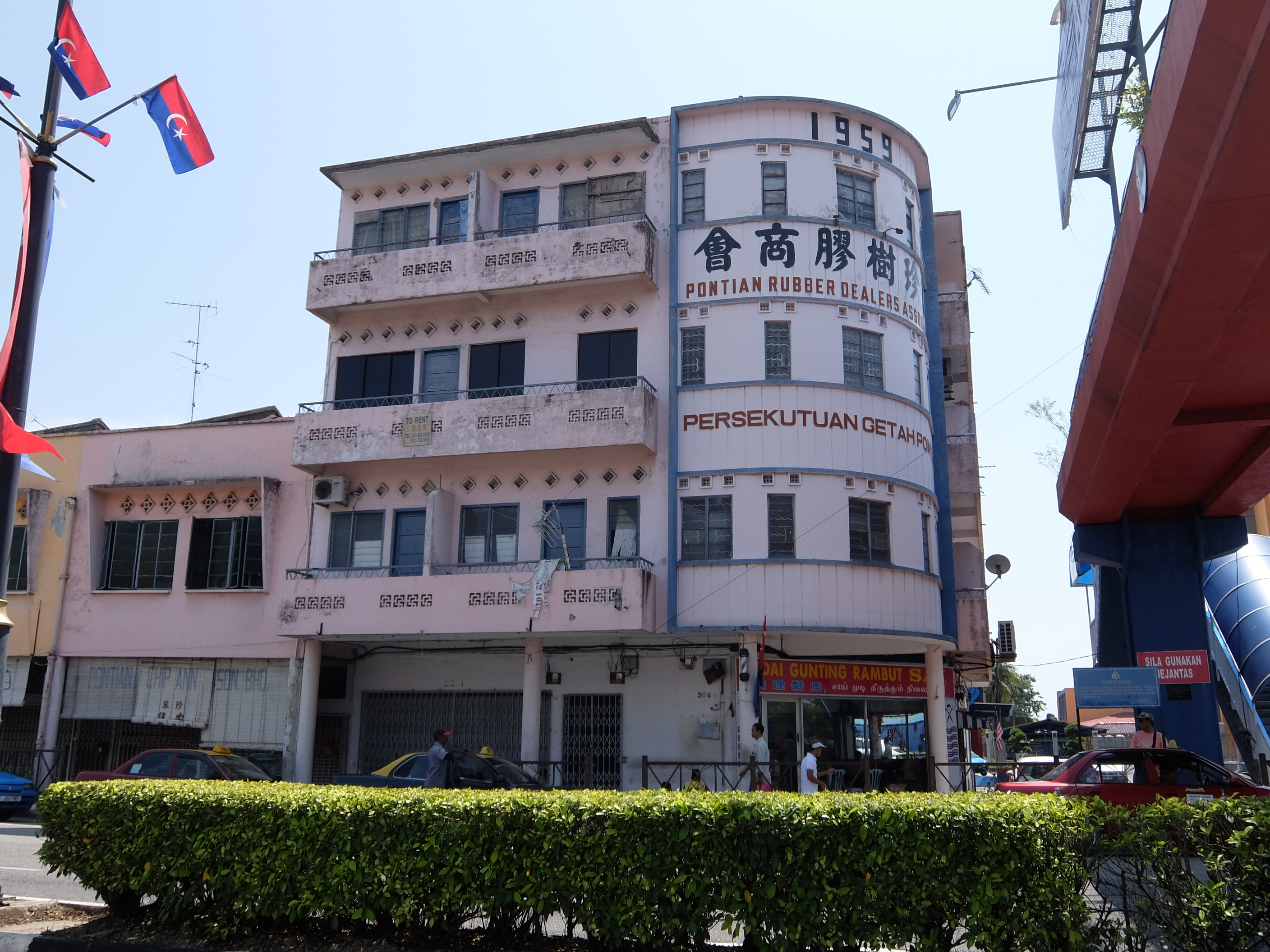
A rubber dealer association office in Pontian Kechil, Johor.

Rubber trees were first planted in British Malaya in 1876. The first commercial rubber planting was in 1896. In 1903, 20,000 acres were dedicated to rubber production in Malaya. By 1922, this number had risen to 2,260,000 acres. Two political restrictions on rubber production – the Stevenson Plan (1922-1928) and the International Rubber Regulation Agreement (1934-1942) – harmed the Malayan economy over the long run, as the rubber restrictions were most stringently enforced there.

Malaysia has earned a good reputation around the world for its high quality and well priced rubber products. Rubber manufacturers in Malaysia supply several rubber products such as medical gloves, components for automobiles, belts, and hoses to several countries such as the United States, Japan, China, and many countries in Europe.

As of 2019, Malaysia ranks as the sixth largest producer and exporter of Natural Rubber, and is a leading producer of rubber products. It is also the largest consumer of natural rubber and the world's largest rubber gloves producer. In 2020, Malaysia's annual rubber gloves exports were valued at US$7.3 billion (RM29.8 billion).

The COVID-19 pandemic led to an increased demand for rubber gloves, reporting an annual growth of 12% year over year. However, an outbreak at top glove factories on 25 November 2020 had a negative effect on their trade.

Malaysia contributes to 46 percent of total rubber production in the world and produces about 1-5 million tons of rubber annually. The production of rubber has declined from the 1990s, when it used to be 615,222 tonnes.

Rubber manufacturers in Malaysia include local smallholders, plantations, multinationals and joint ventures with the United States, Europe, and Japan. Malaysia has a total rubber area of 1.07 million hectares, out of which 7.21 percent is owned by plantation companies. Ninety percent of production is accounted by smallholders who generally hold less than 40 acres of agricultural land. These statistics remain a major concern for the industry as these smallholders tend to move to other economic activities when the rubber price goes down.

The R&D infrastructure developed by Rubber Research Institute of Malaysia and Malaysian Rubber Board has made significant contributions and serves as a comprehensive R&D set up for a single commodity. Malaysia also produces specialty rubber such as the epoxidized natural rubber (Ekoprena) and deproteinized natural rubber (Pureprena) that can be used in green tires and engineering products. It was made to capitalize on the growing preference for natural and renewable materials.

Rubber grades supplied by Malaysia include:

- SMR - Standard Malaysian Rubber
- ENR, DPNR, and TPENR
- Low Protein Latex

== Industry sector ==
Science policies in Malaysia are regulated by the Ministry of Science, Technology, and Innovation. The country is one of the world's largest exporters of semiconductor devices, electrical devices, and IT and communication products.

Malaysia's industrial sector accounts for 36.8%, over a third of the country's GDP in 2014, and employs 36% of the labour force in 2012. The industrial sector mostly contributed by the electronics industry, automotive industry and construction industry.

=== Electrical and electronics ===
The electrical & electronics (E&E) industry is the leading sector in Malaysia's manufacturing sector, contributing significantly to the country's exports and employment. The E&E industry produces 13% of global back-end semiconductors, driving 40% of the nation's export output and contributing about 5.8% to the GDP in 2023. Malaysia benefits from the global demand in the usage of mobile devices (smartphones, tablets), storage devices (cloud computing, data centres), optoelectronics (photonics, fibre optics, LEDs) and embedded technology (integrated circuits, PCBs, LEDs).

==== Electronic components ====
Products/activities which fall under this sub-sector include semiconductor devices, passive components, printed circuits and other components such as media, substrates and connectors.

Within the electronic components sub-sector, the semiconductor devices is the leading contributor of exports for the E&E industry. Exports of semiconductor devices were nearly RM800 billion or 65% of the total E&E products exported in 2026.

Malaysia is a major hub for electrical component manufacturing, with factories of international companies like Intel, AMD, Freescale Semiconductor, ASE, Infineon, STMicroelectronics, Texas Instruments, Fairchild Semiconductor, Renesas, X-Fab and major Malaysian-owned companies such as Green Packet, Silterra, Globetronics, Unisem and Inari which have contributed to the steady growth of the semiconductor industry in Malaysia. To date, there are more than 50 companies, largely MNCs producing semiconductors devices in Malaysia.

==== Photovoltaics ====
Malaysia is a major hub for solar equipment manufacturing, with factories of companies like First Solar, Panasonic, TS Solartech, Jinko Solar, JA Solar, SunPower, Hanwha Q Cells, and SunEdison in locations like Kulim, Penang, Malacca, Cyberjaya and Ipoh.

First Solar's factory in Kulim

In 2013, Malaysia's total production capacity for solar wafers, solar cells and solar panels totalled 4,042 MW. By 2014, Malaysia was the world's third largest manufacturer of photovoltaics equipment, behind China and the European Union.

Many international companies have the majority of production capacity located in Malaysia, such as the American company First Solar which has over 2,000 MW of production capacity located in Kulim and only 280 MW located in Ohio, and formerly German-based Hanwha Q Cells which produces 1,100 MW worth of solar cells in Cyberjaya while producing only 200 MW worth of solar cells in Germany. SunPower's largest manufacturing facility with a capacity of 1,400 MW is also located in Malacca.

=== Automotive ===
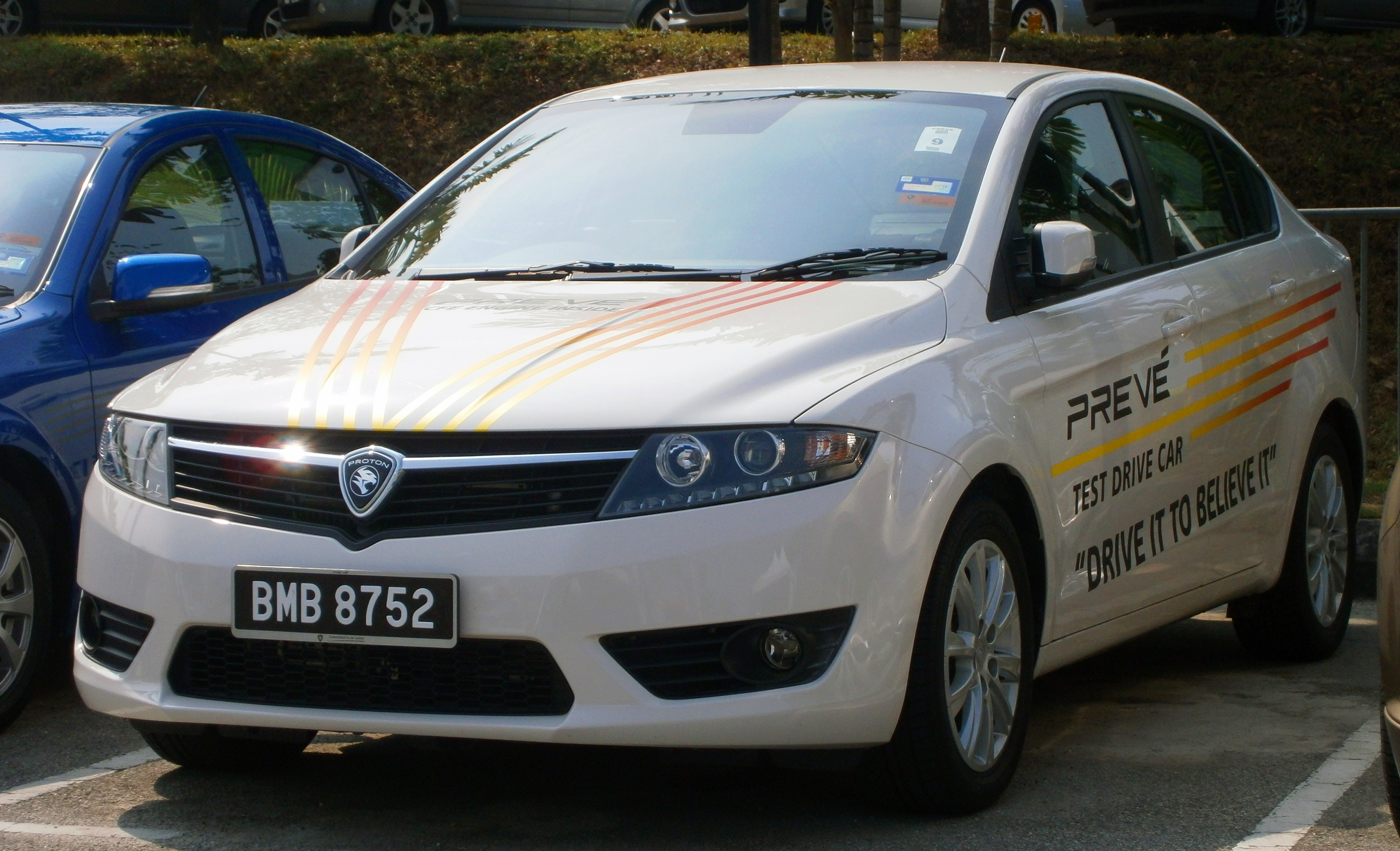
The Proton Prevé, a car made by Malaysian car company Proton.

The automotive industry in Malaysia consists of 27 vehicle producers and over 640 component manufacturers. The Malaysian automotive industry is the third largest in Southeast Asia, and the 23rd largest in the world, with an annual production output of over 500,000 vehicles. The automotive industry contributes 4% or RM 40 billion to Malaysia's GDP, and employs a workforce of over 700,000 throughout a nationwide ecosystem.

The Malaysian automotive industry is Southeast Asia's sole pioneer of indigenous car companies, namely Proton and Perodua. In 2002, Proton helped Malaysia become the 11th country in the world with the capability to fully design, engineer and manufacture cars from the ground up. The Malaysian automotive industry also hosts several domestic-foreign joint venture companies, which assemble a large variety of vehicles from imported complete knock down (CKD) kits.

Malaysia's first tech unicorn startup, automotive e-commerce platform Carsome, raised $290 million in a Series E funding round to expand its product, technology and infrastructure in Malaysia, Indonesia and Thailand. This latest funding round values the used-car online marketplace at $1.7 billion.

=== Construction ===
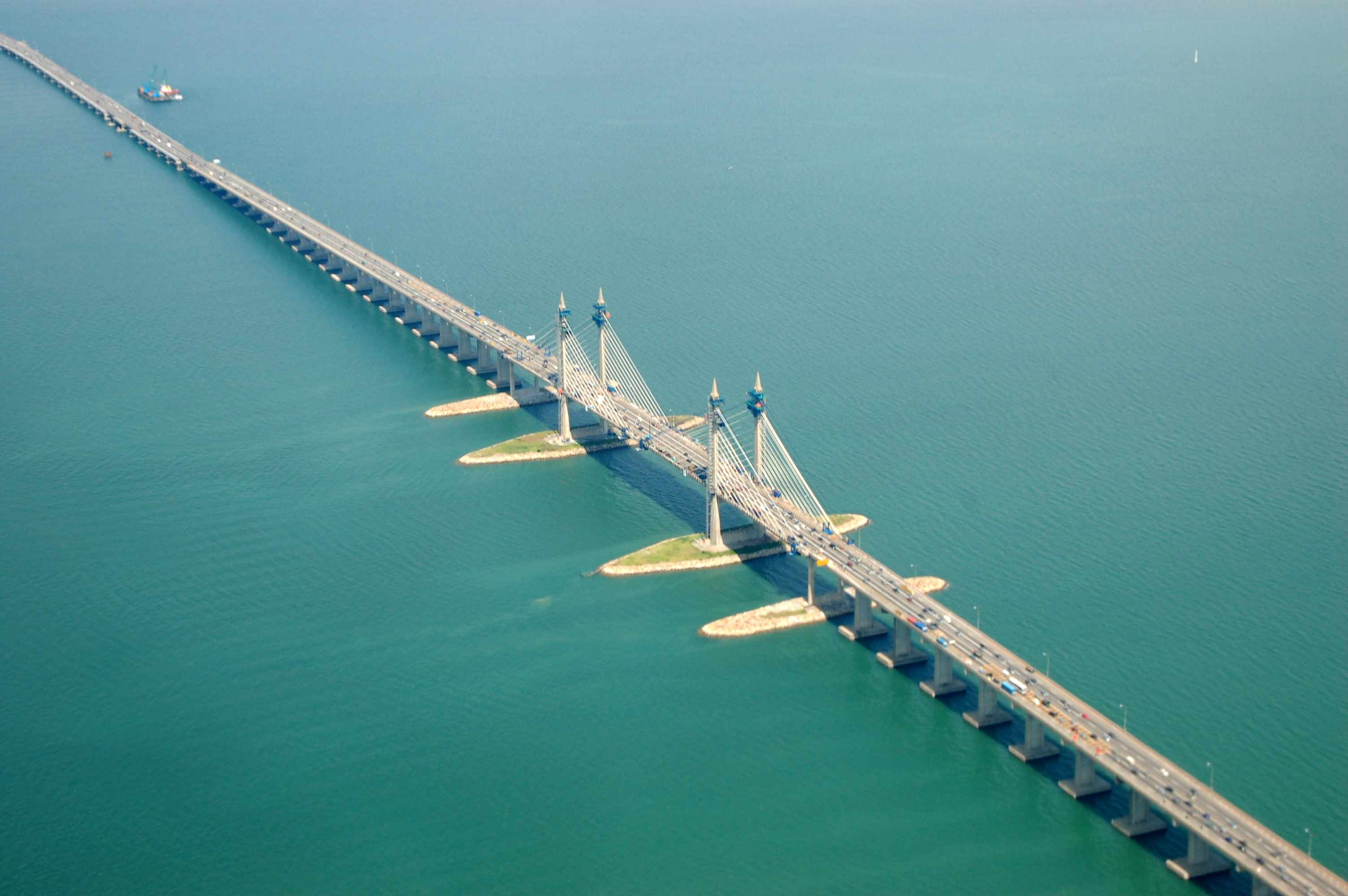
Penang Bridge

Malaysia has a large construction industry of over RM102.2 billion (US$32 billion). The highest percentage share was contributed by construction of non-residential buildings which recorded 34.6 per cent. This was followed by civil engineering sub-sector (30.6%), residential buildings (29.7%), and special trades (5.1%).

Selangor recorded the highest value of construction work done at 24.5% among the states, followed by Johor at 16.5%, Kuala Lumpur at 15.8%, Sarawak at 8.6% and Penang at 6.4%. The contribution of these five states accounted for 71.8% of the total value of construction work in Malaysia.

The expansion of the construction industry has been catalysed by major capital expenditure projects, and a key factor has been the government's Economic Transformation Programme (ETP) and public-private partnership (PPP) mega-projects like Tun Razak Exchange, KVMRT and Iskandar Malaysia.

=== Defence ===
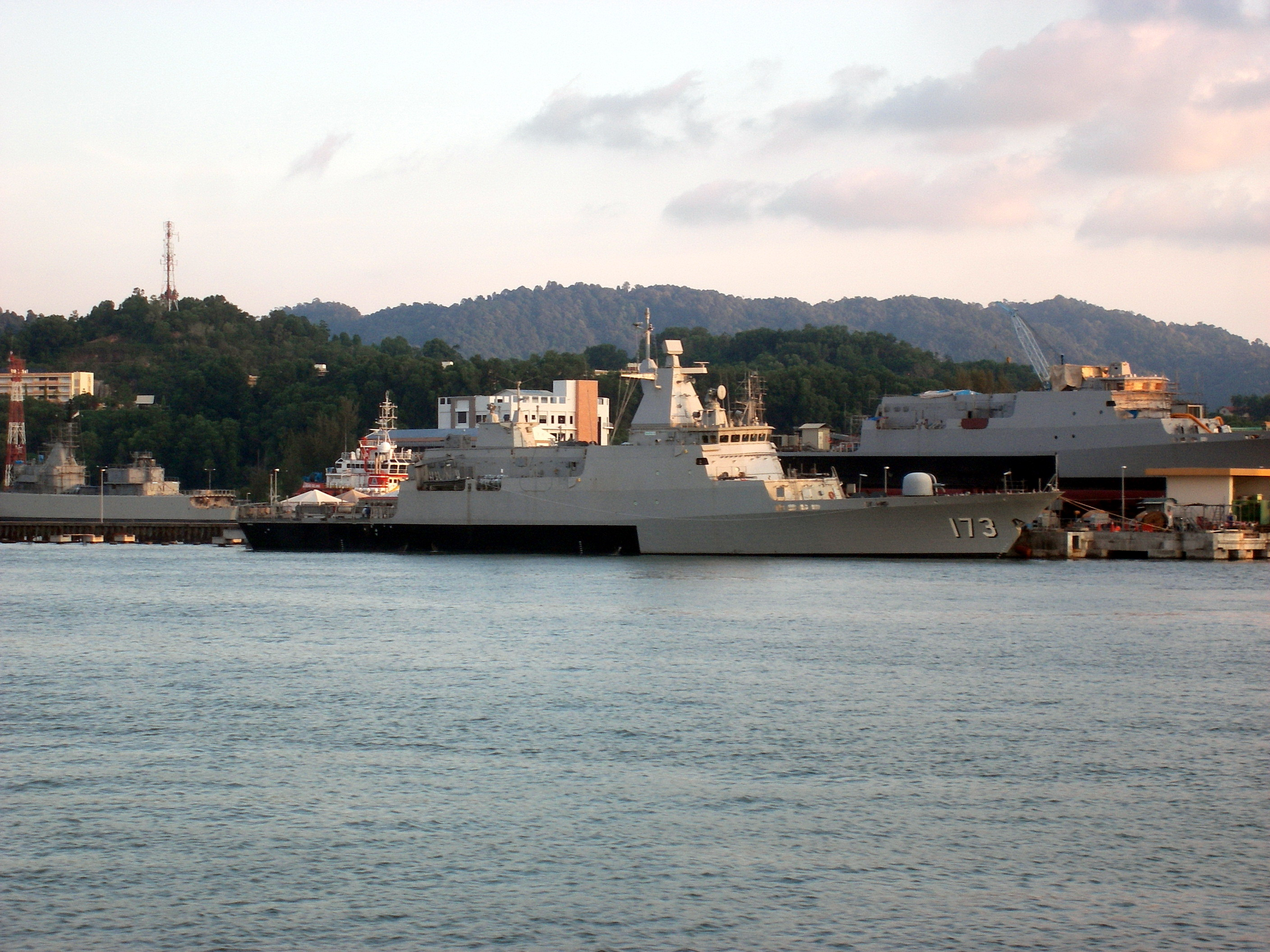
A Kedah-class warship, with another unit being built in the background

Malaysia has a relatively new defence industry that was created after the government created the Malaysia Defence Industry Council to encourage local companies to participate in the country's defence sector in 1999.

The land sector of the defence industry is dominated by DefTech, a subsidiary of Malaysia's largest automotive manufacturer, DRB-HICOM. The company focuses on manufacturing armoured vehicles and specialised logistics vehicles. The company has supplied ACV-15 infantry fighting vehicles to the Malaysian Army in the past and is currently supplying the DefTech AV8 amphibious multirole armoured vehicle to the Malaysian Army.

The sea sector of the defence industry is dominated by Boustead Heavy Industries, who builds warships for the Royal Malaysian Navy (RMN) through transfer of technology with foreign companies. The company has built 4 Kedah-class offshore patrol vessels for the RMN in the past and is currently undertaking a project to build 6 more Second Generation Patrol Vessels for the RMN.

=== Mining ===
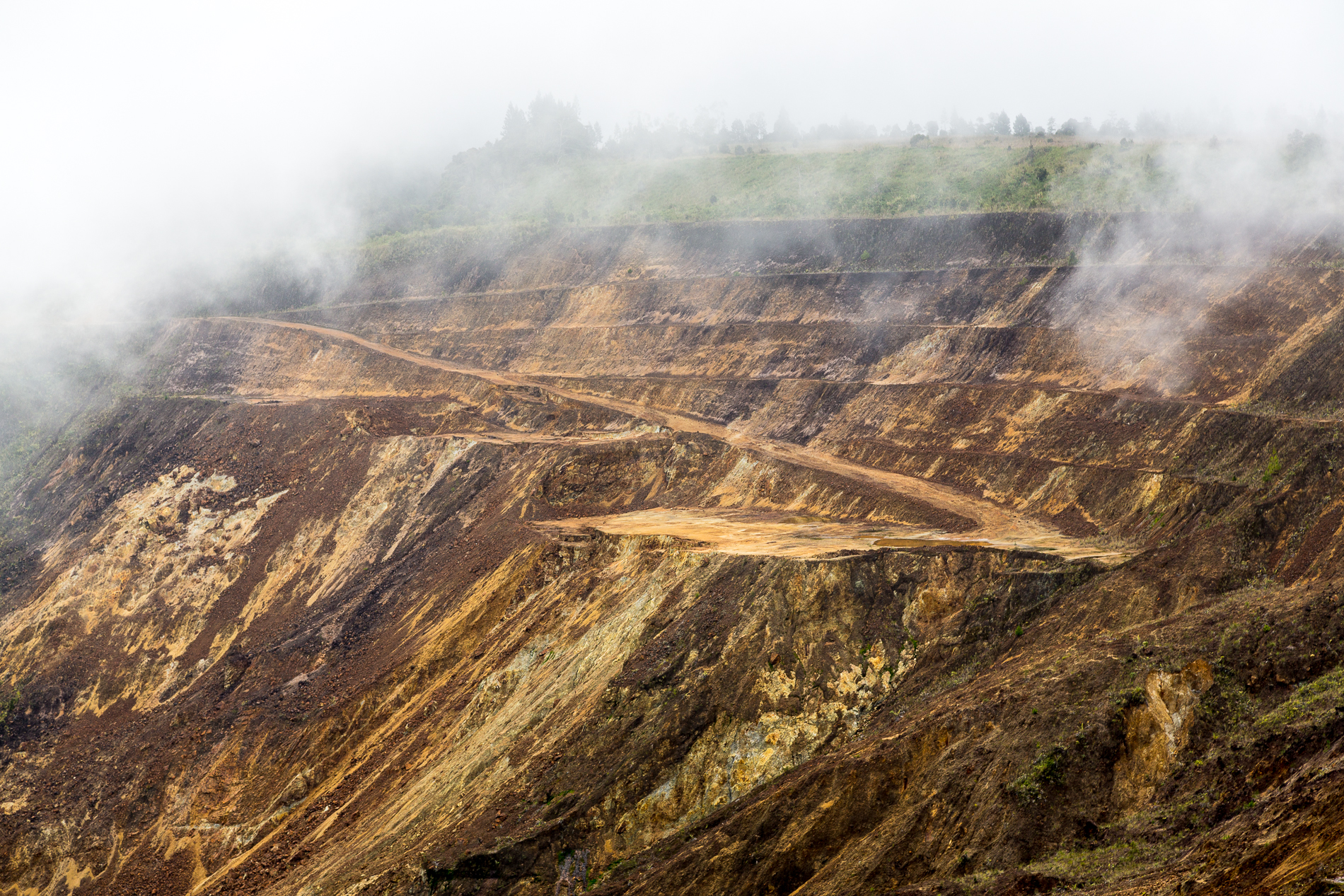
Copper mine in Sabah.

Mining is one of the main industries in Malaysia. Malaysia produces aggregate, bauxite, clay, coal, copper, feldspar, gold, gravel, ilmenite, iron ore, kaolin, limestone, manganese, mica, monazite, sand, silica sand, struverite and tin.

=== Oil and gas ===
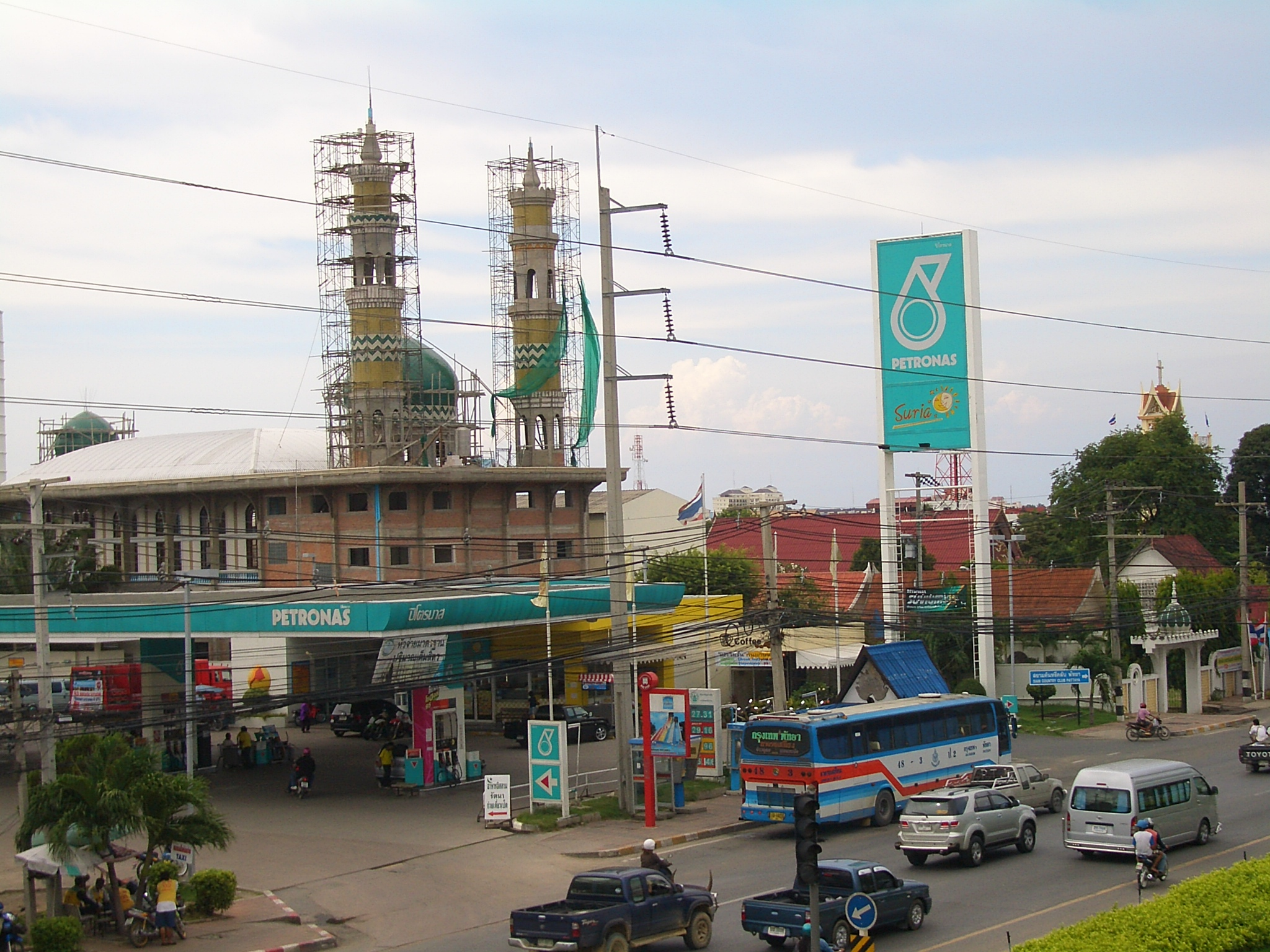
Petronas petrol station in Thailand

Malaysia has a vibrant oil and gas industry. The national oil company, Petronas was ranked 216th in the Fortune 500 list in 2022, generating revenue of over RM171 billion (US$36.5 billion) and possessing total assets of over RM798 billion (US$169 billion) in the first half of 2024. Petronas accounted for more than 20% of the Malaysian government's revenue from 2018 to 2023. The Malaysian government has been actively cutting down on its reliance of petroleum with an expected contribution of approximately RM32 billion (around US$7 billion) from Petronas and RM64 billion (US$13.9 billion) from petroleum-derived revenues, with the latter figure down from RM69.8 billion (US$15.2 billion).

Petronas is also the custodian of oil and gas reserves for Malaysia. Hence, all oil and gas activities are regulated by Petronas. Malaysia encourages foreign oil company participation through production sharing contracts, in which significant amount of oil will be given away to the foreign oil company until it reaches a production milestone. Currently, many major oil companies such as ExxonMobil, Royal Dutch Shell, Nippon Oil, and Murphy Oil are involved in such contracts. As a result, 40% of oil fields in Malaysia are developed.

There are over 3,500 oil and gas (O&G) businesses in Malaysia comprising international oil companies, independents, services and manufacturing companies that support the needs of the O&G value chain both domestically and regionally. Many major global machinery & equipment (M&E) manufacturers have set up bases in Malaysia to complement home-grown M&E companies, while other Malaysian oil and gas companies are focused on key strategic segments such as marine, drilling, engineering, fabrication, offshore installation and operations and maintenance (O&M).

== Services sector ==
=== Finance and banking ===
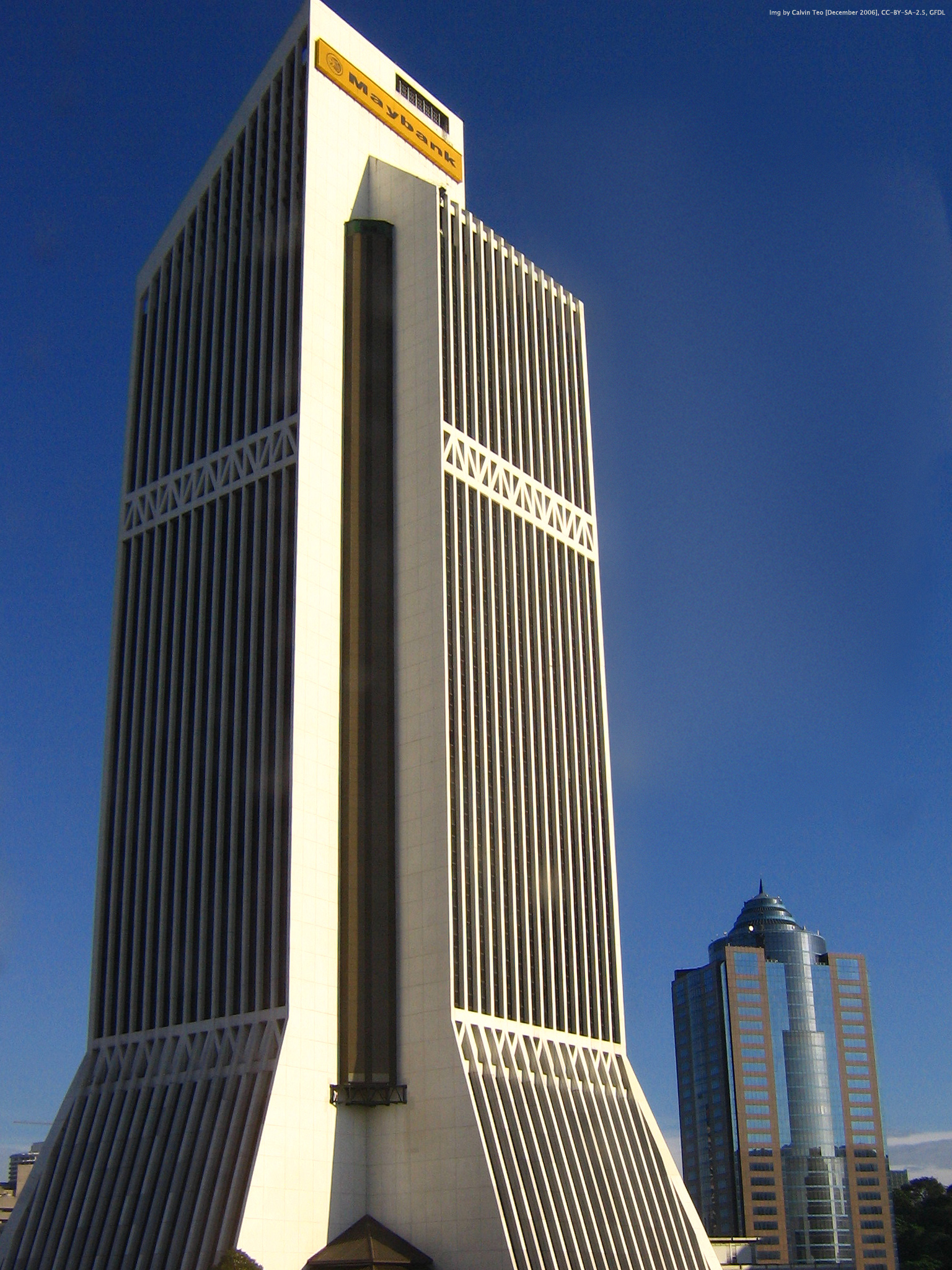
Headquarters of Maybank, Malaysia's largest bank

Kuala Lumpur has a large financial sector, and in the year 2015 is ranked the 22nd in the world in the Global Financial Centres Index. There are currently 27 commercial banks (8 domestic and 19 foreign), 16 Islamic banks (10 domestic and 6 foreign), 15 investment banks (all domestic) and 2 other financial institutions (both domestic) operating in Malaysia.

Commercial banks are the largest and most significant providers of funds in the banking system. The largest banks in Malaysia's finance sector include Maybank, CIMB, Public Bank, RHB Bank, and Hong Leong Bank.

Malaysia is currently also the world's largest centre of Islamic Finance. Malaysia has 16 fully-fledged Islamic banks including five foreign ones, with total Islamic bank assets of US$168.4 billion, which accounts for 25% of the Malaysia's total banking assets. This in turn accounts for over 10% of the world's total Islamic banking assets. In comparison, Malaysia's main rival UAE, has US$95 billion of assets.

Malaysia is the global leader in terms of the sukuk (Islamic bond) market, issuing RM62 billion (US$17.74 billion) worth of sukuk in 2014 - over 66.7% of the global total of US$26.6 billion Malaysia also accounts for around two-thirds of the global outstanding sukuk market, controlling $178 billion of $290 billion, the global total.

The Malaysian government is planning to transform the country's capital Kuala Lumpur into a major financial centre in a bid to raise its profile and spark greater international trade and investment through the construction of the Tun Razak Exchange (TRX). The government believes the project will allow Malaysia to compete with regional financial superpowers such as Singapore and Hong Kong, by leveraging on the country's established strength in the rapidly growing Islamic financial marketplace.

Based in Kuala Lumpur, Bursa Malaysia serves as the country's sole national stock exchange. Trading of shares started in 1960 and it is today one of the largest bourses in Southeast Asia.

=== Education ===
Education in Malaysia is overseen by the Ministry of Education (Malay: Kementerian Pendidikan). Although education is the responsibility of the Federal Government, each state and federal territory has an Education Department to co-ordinate educational matters in its territory. The main legislation governing education is the Education Act 1996.

Education spending usually makes up about 14 per cent of the annual national budget, the biggest allocation among all. The education system in Malaysia is divided into five stages: preschool education, primary education, secondary education, post-secondary education and tertiary education. It is further divided into national and private education. Education may be obtained from the multilingual national school system, which provides free education for all Malaysians, or private schools, or through homeschooling. International and private institutions charge school fees. By law, primary education is compulsory since 2003. Secondary education is expected to be compulsory, with the relevant amendment bill tabled in July 2025. Standardised tests are a common feature as in many Asia-Pacific countries such as the Republic of Korea, Singapore and Japan. Currently, there are 20 public universities, 54 private universities, 39 private university colleges, 10 foreign university branch campuses, 331 private colleges, 36 polytechnics and 105 community colleges in Malaysia.

=== Healthcare ===
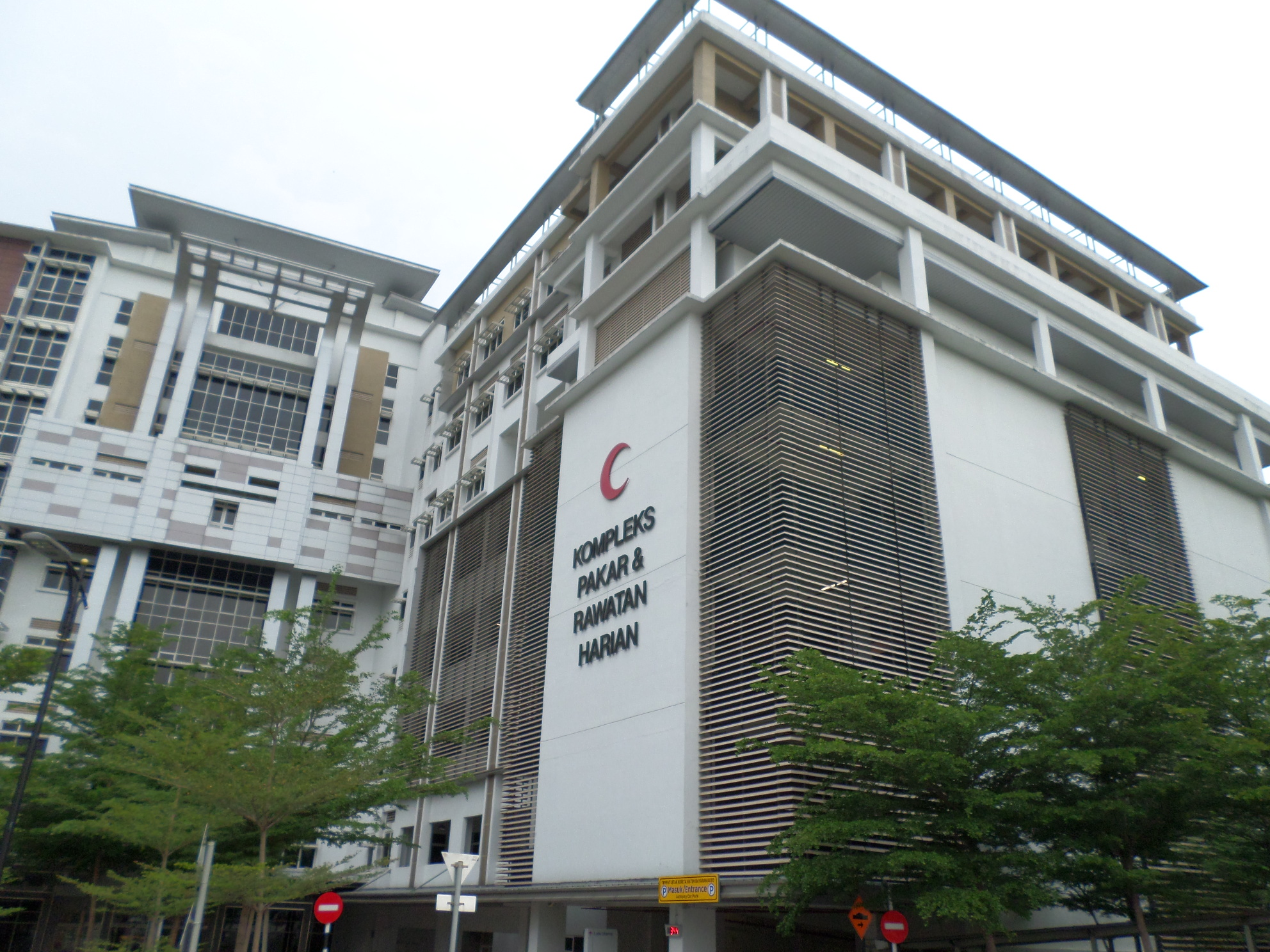
Kuala Lumpur Hospital

Healthcare in Malaysia is under the purview of the Ministry of Health of the Government of Malaysia. Malaysia generally has an efficient and widespread system of health care, operating a two-tier health care system consisting of both a government-run public universal healthcare system along with private healthcare providers. Within the public universal healthcare system, specialist services are either free or have low user fees for procedures (however, appliances are fully self-funded out of pocket by the patient, even within the public healthcare system); as such the public healthcare system suffers from high demand, routine congestion, long wait lists, chronic widespread delays along with persistent shortages in healthcare personnel, medical equipment and healthcare supplies. Therefore, private healthcare providers play a pivotal role in providing specialist consultants and general practitioner (GP) services to the Malaysian population; the private healthcare providers complements or supplants the public healthcare system in terms of availability, types of treatments provided and types of materials used.

Public healthcare in Malaysia is solely funded by general taxation; there are no mandatory national insurance contributions to fund the public universal healthcare system. Due to the issues aforementioned regarding the public universal healthcare system, adoption of private health insurance is widespread among the populace, in order for individuals to pay for the high treatment costs charged at Malaysian private hospitals for medical procedures. Governments from both sides of the political spectrum since under Mahathir Mohamad's time in 1988 has also contemplated on shifting towards a residuals-based system limiting universal coverage only to lower income groups while middle and above classes are relegated to a privatised insurance-based system entirely.

=== Telecommunications ===
Telecommunications in Malaysia fall under the oversight of the Malaysian Communications and Multimedia Commission (MCMC). Established under the Communications and Multimedia Act 1998, the MCMC issues licences for broadcasting, postal, and digital signature services, and enforces industry standards nationwide. The commission is also responsible for implementing the regulations set out in the Postal Services Act 2012 and the Digital Signature Act 1997.

At the state level, Sarawak's telecommunications sector is co-regulated by the Sarawak Multimedia Authority (SMA), established under Section 3 of the Sarawak Multimedia Authority Ordinance 2017. Since its establishment, the SMA and MCMC have cooperated on developing and implementing digital economy initiatives and overseeing the rollout of telecommunications infrastructure in Sarawak. In 2022, Sarawak's Ministry of Public Utilities (later renamed the Ministry of Utility and Telecommunication) created a dedicated Telecommunication Division to manage sector reporting directly to the Sarawak Legislative Assembly.

=== Tourism ===
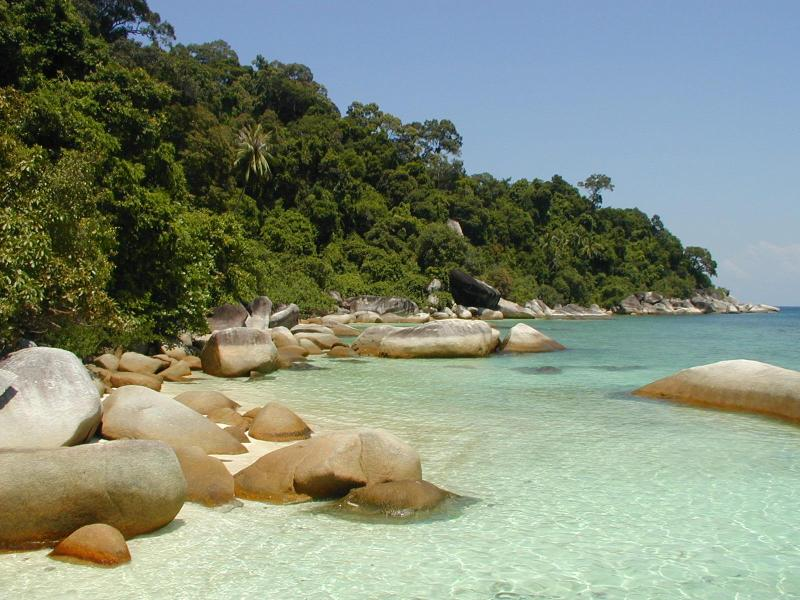
South Beach at Perhentian Besar

Tourism is a huge sector of the Malaysian economy, with 20.14 million tourists generating RM71.3 billion (US$15.5 billion) in tourist receipts in 2023, Total tourist receipts increased by 9% when compared to the 2013 figure of RM65.4 billion (US$20 billion).

Malaysia is ranked 14th of the most visited country in the world in 2024 at 26.1 million tourists.

Malaysia has diverse natural attractions which became an asset to the country's tourism industry. This was recognised by the World Travel & Tourism Council (WTTC), who declared Malaysia as "a destination full of unrealised potential" with the main strength as the availability of a vast range of diverse attractions to suit many tastes at relatively affordable prices and; largely unspoilt destination.

Malaysia's top tourist destinations are the Mulu Caves, Perhentian Islands, Langkawi, Petronas Towers and Mount Kinabalu.

==== Medical tourism ====
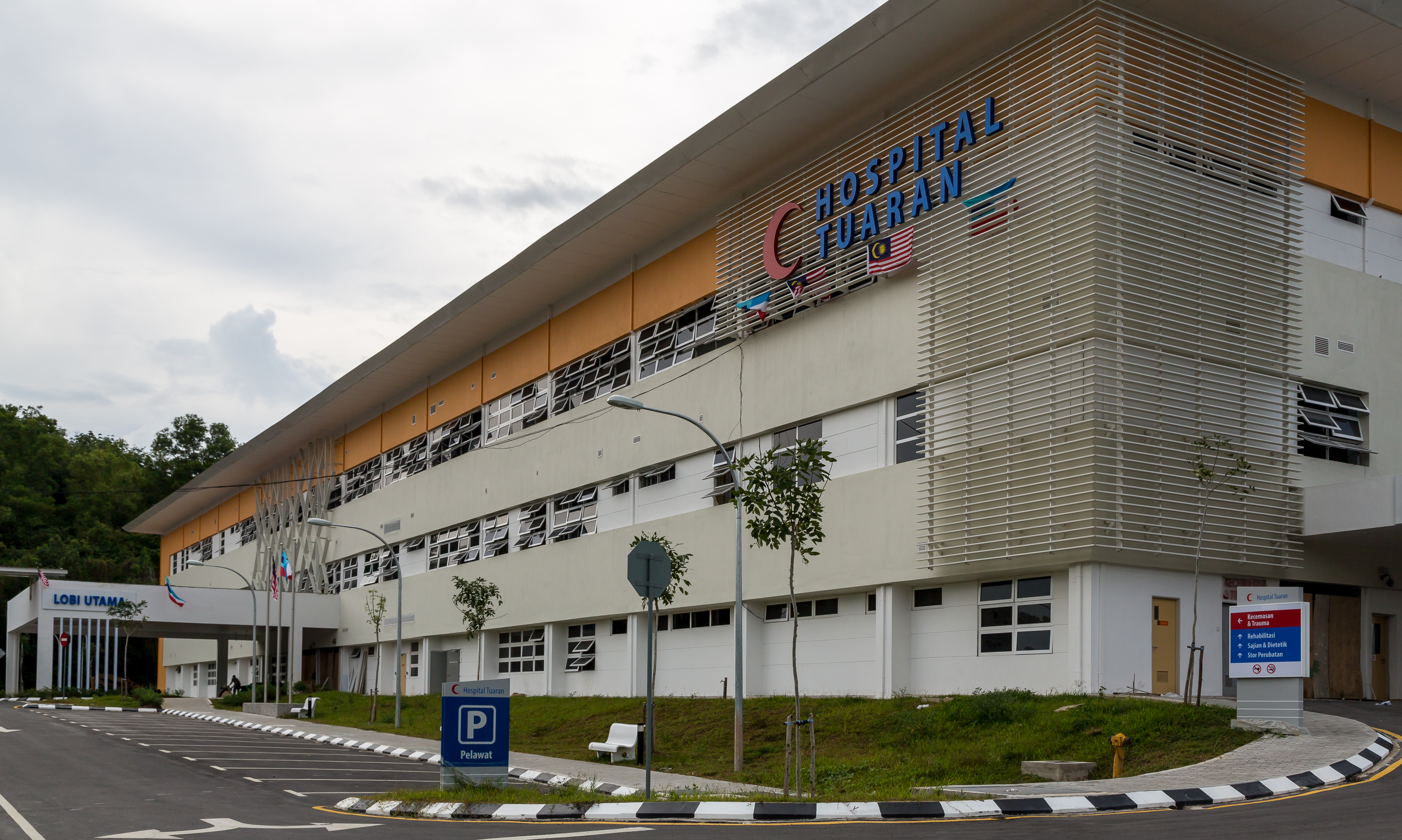
Tuaran Hospital in Sabah

Medical tourism is a significant sector of Malaysia's economy, with around 850,000 individuals travelling to Malaysia specifically for medical treatments alone in 2022, contributing RM1.3 billion (US$295 million) in revenue to the economy. This is down from pre-pandemic numbers of 1.2 million individuals and a total contribution of RM1.7 billion (US$416 million) but the Malaysia Healthcare Travel Council (MHTC) already expects the figures to surpass by 2024, with an expected revenue of RM2.4 billion (US$558 million).

Malaysia is reputed as one of the most preferred medical tourism destinations with modern private healthcare facilities and highly efficient medical professionals. In 2014, Malaysia was ranked the world's best destination for medical tourism by the Nomad Capitalist. Malaysia was also included in the top 10 medical tourism destinations list by CNBC.

In 2014, Prince Court Medical Centre, a Malaysian hospital, was ranked the world's best hospital for medical tourists by MTQUA. MHTC announced that two Malaysian Hospitals were recognised in the Newsweek & Statista's World's Best Hospitals 2024, Gleneagles Kuala Lumpur and Sunway Medical Centre.

== Infrastructure ==
Malaysia's infrastructure is one of the most developed in Asia. In 2016, Malaysia was ranked 18th out of 140 countries in the World Economic Forum's Global Competitiveness Report, the highest among of all developing economies in Asia. Its telecommunications network is second only to Singapore's in Southeast Asia, with 4.5 million fixed-broadband subscribers, 8.4 million fixed-line subscribers and 50.1 million cellular subscribers in 2023. The country has 7 international ports, the major one being the Port Klang. There are 200 industrial parks along with specialised parks such as Technology Park Malaysia and Kulim Hi-Tech Park. Fresh water is available to over 95% of the population. During the colonial period, development was mainly concentrated in economically powerful cities and in areas forming security concerns. Although rural areas have been the focus of great development, they still lag behind areas such as those in the west coast of Peninsular Malaysia. The telecommunication network, although strong in urban areas, is less available to the rural population.

=== Energy ===
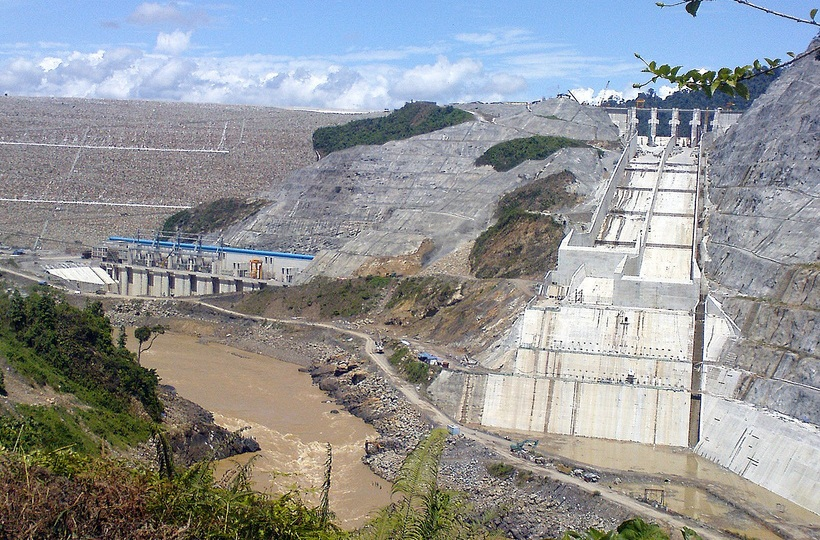
Bakun Dam under construction in 2009

Malaysia's energy infrastructure sector is largely dominated by Tenaga Nasional, the largest electric utility company in Southeast Asia, with over RM99.03 billion in assets. Customers are connected to electricity through the National Grid, with more than 420 transmission substations in the Peninsular linked together by approximately 11,000 km of transmission lines operating at 132, 275 and 500 kilovolts.

In 2013, Malaysia's total power generation capacity was over 29,728 MW. Total electricity generation was 140,985.01 GWh and total electricity consumption was 116,087.51 GWh.

Energy production in Malaysia is largely based on oil and natural gas, owing to Malaysia's oil reserves and natural gas reserves, which is the fourth largest in Asia-Pacific after China, India and Vietnam.

Malaysia has also significant renewable energy resources and has high potential for the development of large-scale solar power and it has one of the most advanced legal frameworks in the ASEAN region for promoting renewables. The country set a 20% target of renewable energy in its energy mix by 2025 and to achieve this the government will need to improve its renewable energy governance, investment policy and market entry for foreign investors as well to develop a framework for easier grid connection and use. As of 2021, Malaysia is one of the major producers of solar panels for the international market, but paradoxically it has yet to fully capitalize on this for domestic electricity generation.

=== Transport network ===
==== Road network ====
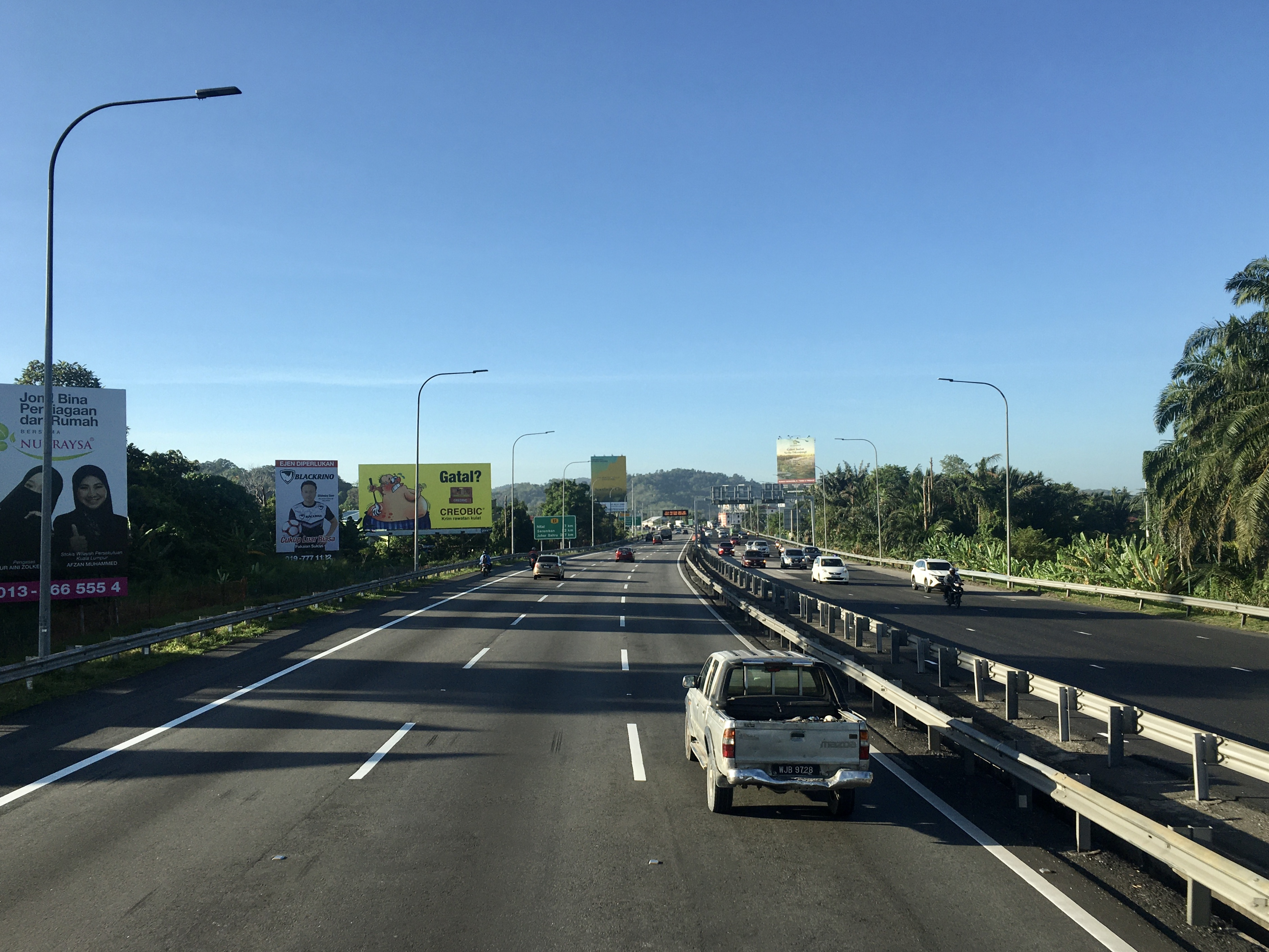
The North–South Expressway, the longest highway in Malaysia

Malaysia's road network is one of the most comprehensive in Asia and covers approximately 280,000 kilometres (173,984 mi).

The main national road network is the Malaysian Federal Roads System, which spans over 41,930 km (26,050 mi). Most of the federal roads in Malaysia are 2-lane roads. In town areas, federal roads may become 4-lane roads to accommodate to increased traffic. Nearly all federal roads are paved with tarmac except parts of the Skudai–Pontian Highway which is paved with concrete, while parts of the Federal Highway linking Klang to Kuala Lumpur, is paved with asphalt.

Malaysia has approximately 5,027 kilometres (3,124 mi) of highways and the longest highway, the North–South Expressway, extends 772 kilometres (480 mi) on the West Coast of Peninsular Malaysia, connecting major urban centres like Kuala Lumpur and Johor Bahru. The Pan-Borneo Highway, which connects Sabah and Sarawak on Borneo Island of East Malaysia, is undergoing a major upgrade to dual carriageway since 2015. A total of 1,663 kilometres (1,033 mi) of the road length is being reconstructed, bringing the standard of East Malaysian highways to the same level of quality of Peninsular highways.

==== Rail network ====
There is currently more than 2,900 kilometres (1,800 mi) of railway in Malaysia, 767 km (477 mi) are double tracked and electrified.

Rail transport in Malaysia comprises heavy rail (KTM), light rapid transit and monorail (Rapid Rail), and a funicular railway line (Penang Hill Railway). Heavy rail is mostly used for intercity passenger and freight transport as well as some urban public transport, while LRTs are used for intra-city urban public transport. There two commuter rail services linking Kuala Lumpur with the Kuala Lumpur International Airport. The sole monorail line in the country is also used for public transport in Kuala Lumpur, while the only funicular railway line is in Penang. A rapid transit project, the KVMRT, is currently under construction to improve Kuala Lumpur's public transport system.

The railway network covers most of the 11 states in Peninsular Malaysia. In East Malaysia, only the state of Sabah has railways. The network is also connected to the Thai railway 1,000 mm (3 ft 3 3/8 in) network in the north. If the Burma Railway is rebuilt, services to Myanmar, India, and China could be initiated.

==== Air network ====
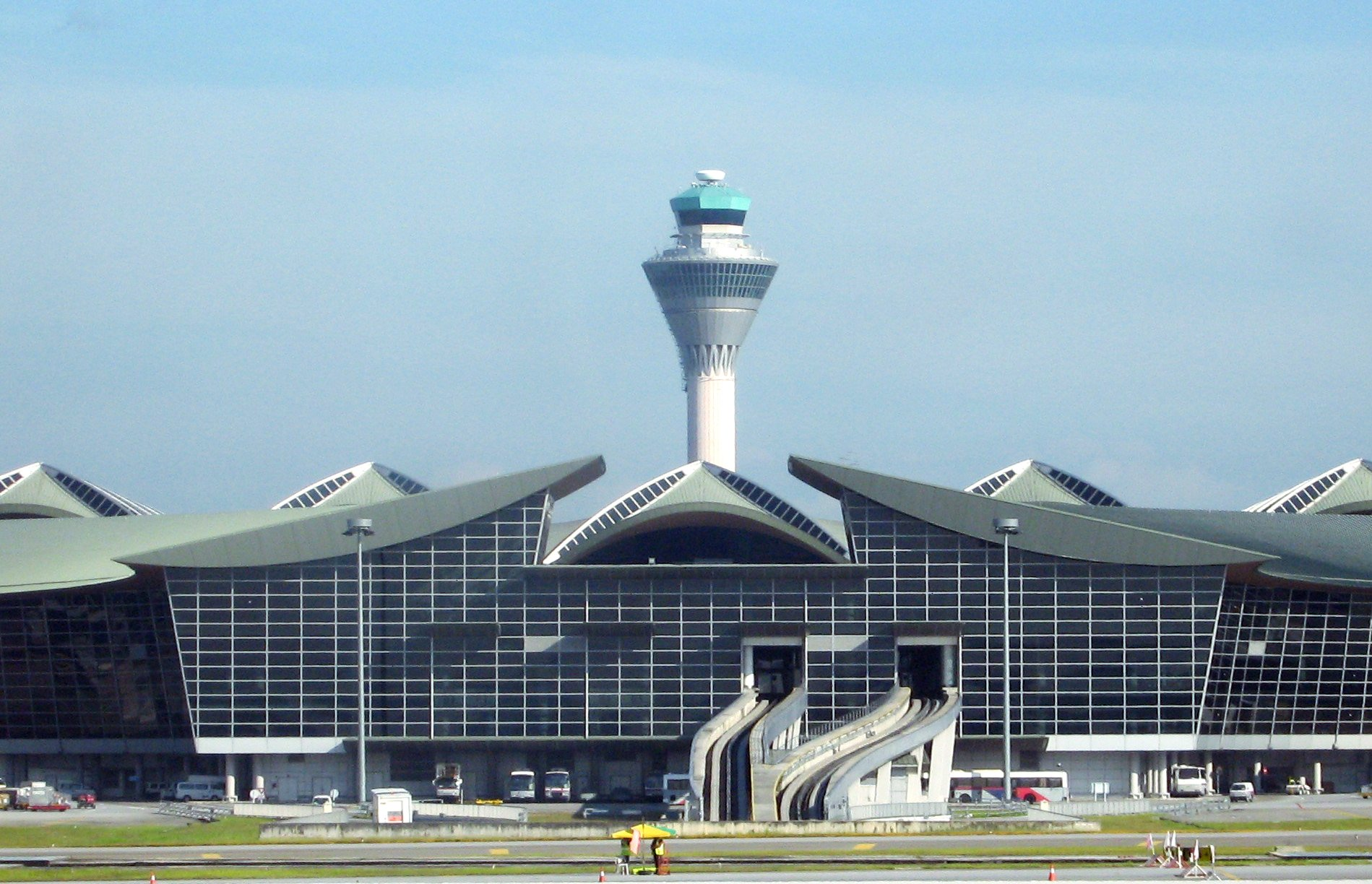
Kuala Lumpur International Airport

Malaysia has 118 airports, of which 38 are paved. Most of the airports are managed by Malaysia Airports Holdings Berhad (MAHB). The national airline is Malaysia Airlines, providing international and domestic air services. Major international routes and domestic routes crossing between West Malaysia and East Malaysia are served by Malaysia Airlines and AirAsia while smaller domestic routes are supplemented by smaller airlines like MASwings, Firefly and Berjaya Air. Major cargo airlines include MASkargo and Transmile Air Services.

Kuala Lumpur International Airport (KLIA) is the main and busiest airport of Malaysia. In 2019, it was the world's 12th busiest airport by international passenger traffic, recording over 44.8 million international passengers. In 2023, it was the world's 35th busiest airport by passenger traffic, recording over 47.2 million passengers. As of 2024, KLIA is the second most connected airport globally, following London Heathrow Airport and preceding Haneda Airport in terms of international connectivity.

Other major airports include Kota Kinabalu International Airport, which is also Malaysia's second busiest airport and busiest airport in East Malaysia with over 9 million passengers in 2019, and Penang International Airport, with approximately 6.8 million passengers in 2023.

==== Sea network ====
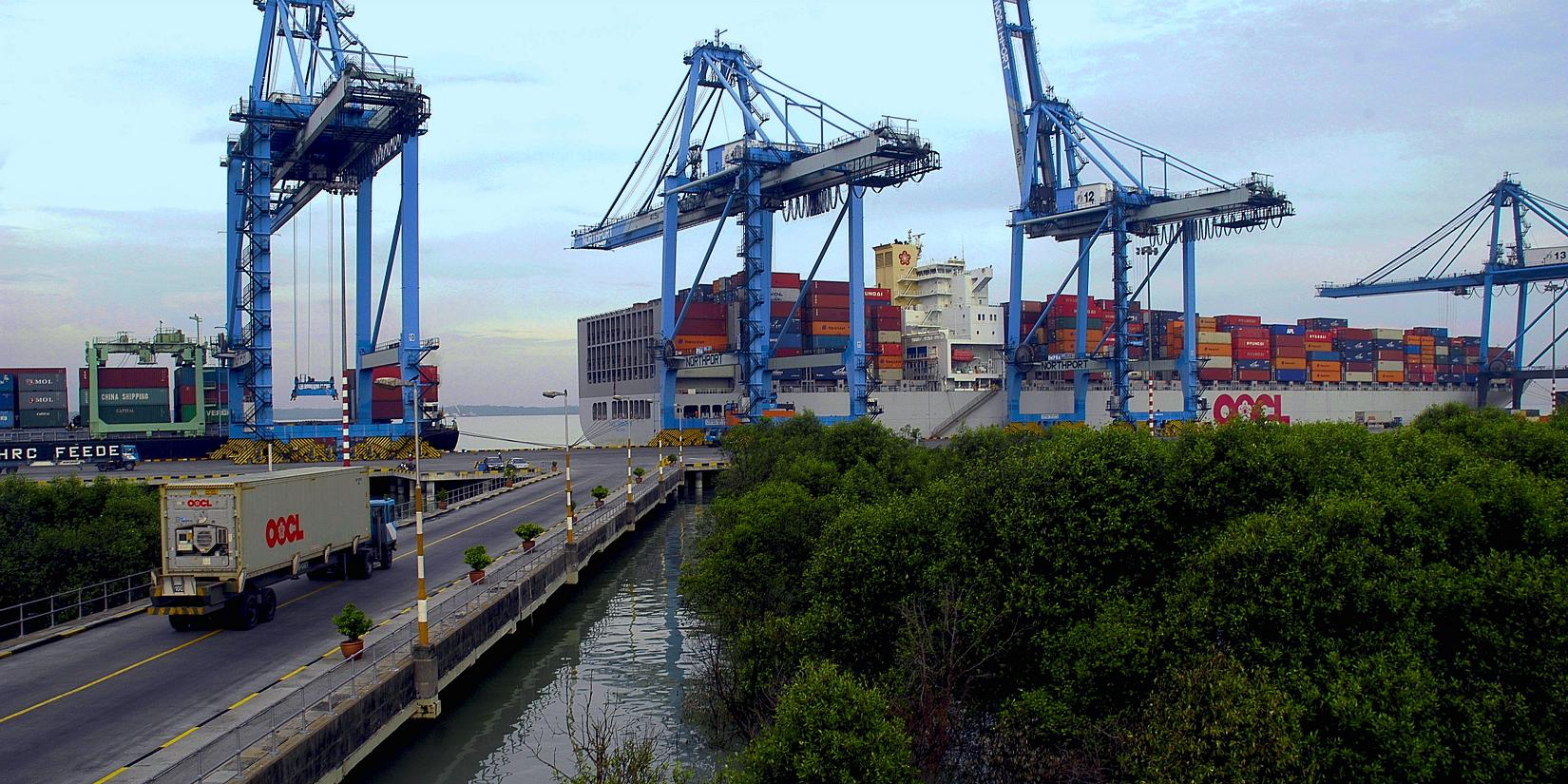
Port Klang

Malaysia is strategically located on the Strait of Malacca, one of the most important shipping lanes in the world. Boasting a highly developed maritime shipping sector, Malaysia has been ranked by UNCTAD as the fifth-best linked country in the world, in terms of shipping trade route connectivity, better than the developed economies of Germany and the Netherlands.

Malaysia has 2 ports that are listed in the top 20 busiest ports in the world, Port Klang and Port of Tanjung Pelepas, which are respectively the second and third busiest ports in Southeast Asia after the Port of Singapore.

Port Klang is Malaysia's busiest port, and the 12th busiest port in the world, handling over 14 million TEUs. Port of Tanjung Pelepas is Malaysia's second busiest port, and the 16th busiest port in the world, handling over 10.4 million TEUs.

=== Water supply and sanitation ===
Water supply and sanitation in Malaysia is characterised by numerous achievements, as well as some challenges. Universal access to water supply at affordable tariffs is a substantial achievement. The government has also shown a commitment to make the sector more efficient, to create a sustainable funding mechanism and to improve the customer orientation of service providers through sector reforms enacted in 2006. The reform creates a modern institutional structure for the water sector, including an autonomous regulatory agency, an asset management company and commercialised state water companies that have to reach certain key performance indicators that will be monitored by the regulatory agency. The government has also stated its intention not to embark on new private sector contracts for water provision, after a bout of such contracts during the 1990s showed mixed results.

A number of challenges remain, only some of which have been addressed by the reforms. First, tariffs are low, thus making cost recovery impossible at current levels so that the sector continues to depend on government subsidies. Second, water losses as well as per capita water use remain high despite efforts at water demand management. Third, a large-scale water transfer project from the Pahang River to Kuala Lumpur is controversial because of its negative social and environmental impacts. Fourth, the development of sewerage and wastewater treatment has lagged behind the development of water infrastructure. For example, much of the collected wastewater is not yet being treated. The sanitation sub-sector has been excluded in the 2006 reforms of the water supply sub-sector.

== External trade ==
Exports of Malaysia by product category (2019) Chemical products Transportation Machines Mineral products Plastics and rubbers Metals Foodstuffs Precious metals Textiles Instruments Animal products Vegetable products Paper goods Footwear and headwear Miscellaneous Stone and glass Wood products Animal and vegetable bi-products Animal hides Arts and antiques Weapons

In 2024, Malaysia's total external trade totalled RM2.879 trillion (approximately US$680 billion), made up of RM1.5 trillion (approximately US$350 billion) of exports and RM1.4 trillion (approximately US$330 billion) of imports, making Malaysia the world's 21st largest exporter and the world's 25th largest importer.

Malaysia's largest trading partner is China. Malaysia has been one of China's top trading partners within ASEAN along with Vietnam. On 31 May 2014, during Najib Razak's visit to China where he was welcomed by China's Premier Li Keqiang, China and Malaysia pledged to increase bilateral trade to US$160 billion by 2017. They also agreed to upgrade economic and financial co-operation, especially in the production of halal food, water processing and railway construction. By 2024, the two-way trade volume between China and Malaysia had reached $212 billion, making Malaysia an important trading partner.

Malaysia's second largest trading partner is Singapore while Malaysia is also Singapore's second largest trading partner, with bilateral trade totalling roughly US$90 billion in 2024.

Malaysia's third largest trading partner is the United States. In 2024, two-way bilateral trade between the US and Malaysia totalled US$86.5 billion, with US exports to Malaysia totalling US$27.6 billion and US imports from Malaysia increasing to US$52.5 billion.

Malaysia is an important trading partner of Japan, amounting RM137.45 billion (US$42 billion) of trade in 2014, an increase of 1.4% compared with to 2013. Out of this, exports totalled RM82.71 billion (US$25.6 billion), a growth of 4.4% cent while imports contracted 2.9% to RM54.75 billion (US$16.74 billion). Malaysian Ambassador to Japan Datuk Ahmad Izlan Idris said the main exports from Malaysia to Japan were liquefied natural gas (LNG), electrical and electronics as well as chemical-based products. He said Malaysia's main imports from Japan were electrical and electronics, machines and equipment as well as spare parts and accessories for vehicles and cars.

== Free trade efforts ==
=== International trade agreements ===
Economy	Agreement	Abbreviation	Concluded	Signed	Effective	Legal Text
Japan	Malaysia–Japan Economic Partnership Agreement	MJEPA	13 December 2005	13 December 2005	13 July 2006	
Pakistan	Malaysia–Pakistan Closer Economic Partnership Agreement	MPCEPA	8 November 2007	8 November 2007	1 January 2008	
New Zealand	Malaysia–New Zealand Free Trade Agreement	MNZFTA	30 May 2009	26 October 2009	1 August 2010	
India	India–Malaysia Comprehensive Economic Cooperation Agreement	MICECA		18 February 2011	1 July 2011	
Chile	Malaysia–Chile Free Trade Agreement	MCFTA	May 2010	13 November 2010	25 February 2012	
Australia	Malaysia–Australia Free Trade Agreement	MAFTA	30 March 2012		1 January 2013	
Turkey	Malaysia–Turkey Free Trade Agreement	MTFTA	15 January 2014	17 April 2014	1 August 2015	
China	ASEAN–China Free Trade Agreement	ATFTA		November 2002	1 January 2010	
Japan	ASEAN–Japan Comprehensive Economic Partnership Agreement	AJCEP		14 April 2008	1 February 2009	
South Korea	ASEAN–Korea Free Trade Agreement	AKFTA			1 January 2010	
India	ASEAN–India Free Trade Agreement	AIFTA		13 August 2009	1 January 2010	
Australia; New Zealand	ASEAN–Australia-New Zealand Free Trade Area Agreement	AANZFTA		27 February 2009	1 January 2010	
Hong Kong	ASEAN–Hong Kong Free Trade Agreement	AHKFTA		12 November 2017	13 October 2019	
ASEAN; China; Japan; South Korea; Australia; New Zealand	Regional Comprehensive Economic Partnership	RCEP		15 November 2020	18 March 2022	

=== Trade agreements under negotiation ===
- Malaysia–United States Free Trade Agreement
- Malaysia-EFTA Economic Partnership Agreement since 2012
- Malaysia–European Union Free Trade Agreement (MEUFTA)
- Trans-Pacific Partnership Agreement (TPP)
- Trade Prefential System-Organisation of Islamic Conference (TPS-OIC)
- Developing Eight (D-8) Preferential Tariff Agreement (PTA)

== Investment ==
Malaysia's total accumulated investments in 2014 was RM235.9 billion, with 72.6 per cent (RM171.3 billion) being contributed by domestic sources and 27.4 per cent (RM64.6 billion) coming from foreign sources.

According to A.T. Kearney, a global management consulting firm, Malaysia was ranked 15th in the 2014 Foreign Direct Investment Confidence Index, 9th in 2012, 16th in 2007 and 21st in 2010. The index assesses the impact of political, economic and regulatory changes on the FDI intentions and preferences of the leaders of top companies around the world.

Rank 2007	Rank 2010	Rank 2012	Rank 2014	Country	FDI Confidence Index
3	2	4	1	United States	2.16
1	1	1	2	China	1.95
–	9	20	3	Canada	1.93
4	10	8	4	United Kingdom	1.91
6	4	3	5	Brazil	1.91
10	5	5	6	Germany	1.84
5	3	2	7	India	1.81
11	7	6	8	Australia	1.76
7	24	7	9	Singapore	1.75
8	13	17	10	France	1.74
20	11	15	11	United Arab Emirates	1.74
19	8	–	12	Mexico	1.72
18	–	11	13	South Africa	1.70
–	–	22	14	Switzerland	1.68
16	21	10	15	Malaysia	1.65
–	–	–	16	Sweden	1.64
–	–	–	17	Chile	1.64
-	–	24	18	Spain	1.63
–	–	21	19	Japan	1.62
–	–	–	20	Italy	1.61
12	–	16	21	Belgium	1.61
6	6	23	22	Netherlands	1.61
–	–	18	23	Denmark	1.61
13	–	19	24	Turkey	1.60
18	23	13	25	Indonesia	1.60

=== Special economic zones ===
- East Coast Economic Region (ECER)
- Iskandar Malaysia (IM)
  - Johor-Singapore Special Economic Zone (JS-SEZ)
  - Forest City Special Financial Zone (SFZ)
- Malaysia Vision Valley (MVV)
- MSC Malaysia
- Northern Corridor Economic Region (NCER)
- Labuan International Business and Financial Centre (IBFC)
- Port Klang Free Zone (PKFZ)

== Largest public Malaysian companies ==
=== Fortune Global 500 ===
Malaysia has 1 company that rank in the Fortune Global 500 ranking for 2022.

World Rank	Company	Industry	Sales ($M)	Profits ($M)	Assets ($M)	Employees
216	Petronas	Oil and gas	59,873	10,091	152,498	46,884

=== Forbes Global 2000 ===
Malaysia has 8 companies that rank in the Forbes Global 2000 ranking for 2022.

World rank	Company	Industry	Sales (billion $)	Profits (billion $)	Assets (billion $)	Market value (billion $)
485	Maybank	Banking	9.2	2.0	213.2	24.7
837	Tenaga Nasional	Utilities	12.7	0.883	43.8	11.8
751	Public Bank Berhad	Banking	4.5	1.4	111.1	21.2
895	CIMB Group Holdings	Banking	5.7	1.0	149.3	12.2
1525	RHB Capital	Banking	2.6	0.631	69.5	5.7
1641	Hong Leong Financial Group	Business services & supplies	1.9	0.567	66.7	5.1
1448	Top Glove	Health care equipment & services	3.6	1.6	3.1	10.8
1236	Petronas Chemicals	Chemicals	5.6	1.8	11.5	19.1

== See also ==
- Economy of Johor
- Economy of Penang
- Economy of Sarawak
- List of companies of Malaysia
- List of largest companies in Malaysia
- List of Malaysians by net worth
- List of Malaysian states by GDP
- List of Malaysian states by household income
- List of Malaysian states by mean wage and median wage
- Bamboo network
- BIMP-EAGA
- Indonesia–Malaysia–Singapore Growth Triangle
- Indonesia–Malaysia–Thailand Growth Triangle
- Malaysian Green Transition
- Malaysian national projects
- Shared Prosperity Vision 2030
- Tiger Cub Economies
- Wawasan 2020
