= MDIC =

MDIC may refer to:

- Malaysia Defence Industry Council, government agency of Malaysia
- Ministry of Development, Industry and Foreign Trade (Ministério do Desenvolvimento, Indústria, e Comércio Exterior), former ministry of Brazil
