= Malaysian Green Transition =

Malaysian governmental sustainable development strategy

The Malaysia Green Transition refers to the sustainable development strategy implemented by the Malaysian government to combat climate change, stimulate economic growth, and improve societal well-being. The shift towards a greener economy began in earnest in the early 2020s, with ambitious targets set to drastically reduce greenhouse gas emissions and incorporate renewable energy sources into the national grid.

== Overview ==
Following global trends and increasing environmental concerns, Malaysia recognized the pressing need for a transition to a green, sustainable economy. The Malaysian government announced a comprehensive plan that centered on sustainable development, green technology, biodiversity preservation, and climate change mitigation. This shift, known as the Malaysia Green Transition, aims to decarbonize various sectors, promote renewable energy sources, and establish a circular economy.

In 2024, the Malaysian government launched the Energy Exchange Malaysia (Enegem), a platform designed to facilitate the cross-border trade of green electricity within the ASEAN region, aligning with global sustainability efforts and the Asean Power Grid Initiative aimed at integrating regional power systems. Enegem initiated with a 100-megawatt pilot auction to supply green electricity from Peninsular Malaysia to Singapore, targeting licensed Renewable Energy (RE) Bidders in the Singapore Electricity Market. This initiative enhances regional energy cooperation and promotes the development of renewable energy sources across Southeast Asia.

== Policy framework and initiatives ==
=== Green Technology Master Plan (2021–2030) ===
The Green Technology Master Plan was one of the first significant policy frameworks laid out by the government to guide the green transition. This blueprint highlights six sectors: energy, manufacturing, building, transport, waste, and water. The plan set specific goals, including achieving 40% renewable energy in the electricity mix by 2035 and enhancing energy efficiency in the manufacturing and building sectors.

=== National Biodiversity Policy (2022–2030) ===
The National Biodiversity Policy seeks to protect and manage Malaysia's rich biodiversity while harnessing its potential for sustainable economic development. The policy aims to integrate biodiversity considerations into all relevant sectors and decision-making processes.

=== Sustainable and Circular Economy Roadmap (2023-2040) ===
The government introduced the Sustainable and Circular Economy Roadmap to transition the country towards a circular economy. The approach promotes the efficient use of resources, waste minimization, and the regeneration of natural systems.

== Progress and achievements ==
Since the onset of the Malaysia Green Transition, notable progress has been made in several sectors.

The country made significant strides in expanding its renewable energy portfolio, particularly in solar and hydroelectric power. By 2023, the share of renewable energy in the national grid rose to 22%, a significant increase from the previous decade.

Energy efficiency measures have been implemented across various sectors, with considerable progress in the building and industrial sectors. Mandatory energy audits, green building index certifications, and efficient energy management systems have reduced the energy intensity of these sectors.

Malaysia has implemented several waste-to-energy projects, transforming municipal waste into energy. An increase in recycling rates and the introduction of policies targeting single-use plastics have contributed to a shift towards a circular economy.

== Challenges and future directions ==
While the Malaysia Green Transition has seen significant achievements, it faces several challenges, including economic restructuring, financing green technologies, and public awareness and participation.

The Malaysian government plans to continue strengthening its green policies and initiatives, focusing on a just transition that ensures equitable opportunities and benefits for all citizens. Future directions include greater emphasis on nature-based solutions, blue economy, and digitalization in the green economy.

== See also ==
- Environmental issues in Malaysia
- Renewable energy in Malaysia
- Economy of Malaysia
- Circular economy
