= India–Malaysia Comprehensive Economic Cooperation Agreement =

Free trade agreement between Malaysia and India

The Comprehensive Economic Cooperation Agreement (CECA) is a free trade agreement between Malaysia and India to strengthen bilateral trade. The agreement is in line with the recommendations given by the Joint Study Group which contained members from both the parties. This was signed by Dr. Manmohan Singh, the then Prime Minister of India and Mr. Najib Razak, the Malaysian Prime Minister on 27 October 2010 at Kuala Lumpur, Malaysia.

== Aims ==
The aims of the agreement is to enhance economic and social benefits, improve living standards and ensure high and steady growth in real incomes in their respective territories by expansion of trade and investment flows, to promote economics development and to promote investment between Malaysia and India.
