= Education Act 1996 (Malaysia) =

Parliament of Malaysia
- Long title: An Act to provide for education and for matters connected therewith.
- Citation: Act 550
- Territorial extent: Throughout Malaysia
- Passed by: Dewan Rakyat
- Passed: 20 December 1995
- Passed by: Dewan Negara
- Passed: 28 December 1995
- Royal assent: 15 July 1996
- Commenced: 1 August 1996
- Effective: 31 December 1997, P.U. (B) 541/1997

Legislative history

Initiating chamber: Dewan Rakyat
- Bill title: Education Bill 1995
- Bill citation: D.R. 35/1995
- Introduced by: Najib Razak, Minister of Education
- First reading: 7 December 1995
- Second reading: 18 December 1995
- Third reading: 20 December 1995

Revising chamber: Dewan Negara
- Bill title: Education Bill 1995
- Bill citation: D.R. 35/1995
- Member(s) in charge: Mohd. Khalid Mohd. Yunus, Deputy Minister of Education
- First reading: 21 December 1995
- Second reading: 27 December 1995
- Third reading: 28 December 1995

Amended by
- Education (Amendment) Act 2002 [Act A1152] Education (Amendment) Act 2009 [Act A1341]

Related legislation
- Education Act 1961; Education (Amendment) Act 1963 [Act 32 of 1963] Education Act (Extension to Sarawak) Order 1975 [P.U. (A) 425/1975] Education Act (Extension to Sabah) Order 1976 [P.U. (A) 176/1976]

Keywords
- Education
- Status: In force

The Education Act 1996 (Malay: Akta Pendidikan 1996) is an Act of the Parliament of Malaysia, which was enacted to provide for education and for matters connected therewith.

== Preamble ==
Preamble of the Act provides the following acknowledgements:

1. WHEREAS acknowledging that knowledge is the key determinant of the destiny and survival of the nation:
2. AND WHEREAS the purpose of education is to enable the Malaysian society to have a command of knowledge, skills and values necessary in a world that is highly competitive and globalized, arising from the impact of rapid development in science, technology and information:
3. AND WHEREAS education plays a vital role in achieving the country's vision of attaining the status of a fully developed nation in terms of economic development, social justice, and spiritual, moral and ethical strength, towards creating a society that is united, democratic, liberal and dynamic:
4. AND WHEREAS it is the mission to develop a world-class quality education system which will realize the full potential of the individual and fulfill the aspiration of the Malaysian nation:
5. AND WHEREAS the National Education Policy is based on the National Philosophy of Education which is expressed as follows:
  1. “Education in Malaysia is an ongoing effort towards further developing the potential of individuals in a holistic and integrated manner so as to produce individuals who are intellectually, spiritually, emotionally and physically balanced and harmonious, based on a firm belief in and devotion to God. Such an effort is designed to produce Malaysian citizens who are knowledgeable and competent, who possess high moral standards, and who are responsible and capable of achieving a high level of personal well-being as well as being able to contribute to the betterment of the family, the society and the nation at large”:
6. AND WHEREAS the above policy is to be executed through a national system of education which provides for the national language to be the main medium of instruction, a National Curriculum and common examinations; the education provided being varied and comprehensive in scope and which will satisfy the needs of the nation as well as promote national unity through cultural, social, economic and political development in accordance with the principles of Rukunegara:
7. AND WHEREAS it is considered desirable that regard shall be had, so far as is compatible with that policy, with the provision of efficient instruction and with the avoidance of unreasonable public expenditure, to the general principle that pupils are to be educated in accordance with the wishes of their parents

== Structure ==
The Education Act 1996, in its current form (1 January 2012), consists of 16 Parts containing 156 sections and 1 schedule (including 2 amendments).

- Part I: Preliminary
- Part II: Administration
- Part III: National Education Advisory Council
- Part IV: Education System
  - Chapter 1—The National Education System
  - Chapter 2—Pre-School Education
  - Chapter 3—Primary Education
  - Chapter 4—Secondary Education
  - Chapter 5—Post Secondary Education
  - Chapter 6—Other Educational Institutions
  - Chapter 7—Technical Education and Polytechnics
  - Chapter 8—Special Education
  - Chapter 9—Teacher Education
  - Chapter 10—Religious Teaching in Educational Institutions
  - Chapter 11—Management of Educational Institutions
  - Chapter 12—Provision of Facilities and Services
- Part V: Assessment and Examination
- Part VI: Higher Education
- Part VII: Private Educational Institutions
- Part VIII: Registration of Educational Institutions
  - Chapter 1—Registration of Educational Institutions
  - Chapter 2—Cancellation of Registration
  - Chapter 3—Registration of Governors and Employees
  - Chapter 4—Registration of Pupils
  - Chapter 5—Inspection of Educational Institutions by the Registrar General
- Part IX: Registration of Teachers
  - Chapter 1—Registration of Teachers
  - Chapter 2—Permits to Teach
  - Chapter 3—Miscellaneous
- Part X: The Inspectorate of Schools
  - Chapter 1—The Inspectorate
  - Chapter 2—General
- Part XI: Finance
- Part XII: Appeals
- Part XIII: Regulations
- Part XIV: Offences and Penalties
- Part XV: Miscellaneous
- Part XVI: Transitional and Repeal
- Schedule

== See also ==
- Education Act
