= Malaysia–European Union Free Trade Agreement =

MEUFTA
Malaysia-European Union Free Trade Agreement
- Type: Proposed Free trade agreement
- Parties: Malaysia; European Union

The Malaysia-European Union Free Trade Agreement (MEUFTA) is a proposed free trade agreement between Malaysia and the European Union (EU). The negotiations were restarted in January 2025 after the first attempt was put on hold in 2012.

As of 2025, Malaysia ranks as the EU's 22nd-largest global trade partner in goods and the third-largest trading partner within ASEAN, with total trade reaching €48.9 billion (RM233.16 billion). As of 2022, the EU as a bloc was Malaysia's second-largest source of foreign direct investment with a total investment position of €25.88 billion (RM121.6 billion), mainly in manufacturing.

== History ==
Negotiations for a Free Trade Agreement between the EU and Malaysia were launched in 2010 and put on hold after seven rounds in 2012, after the parties failed to find common ground. While the EU had requested the liberalisation of the service sector, the removal of caps on foreign equity holdings, and clear rules on government procurement and intellectual property rights, Malaysia rejected these terms, asking for concessions and exceptions. This divergence, combined with the 2013 Malaysian general election and the rise of the U.S.-led Trans-Pacific Partnership talks, ultimately led to the parties interrupting the negotiations. A stocktaking exercise took place in 2016–17 to conclude a Partnership and Cooperation Agreement (MEUPCA) as an umbrella to push the resumption of the FTA negotiations, but talks stalled for the same precedent reasons.

The revival of negotiations was actively supported during the 2020–2024 period, when efforts to re-engage on the Malaysia–EU FTA were publicly encouraged by EU representatives, including then EU Ambassador to Malaysia, Michalis Rokas. Optimism regarding the resumption of talks was expressed through various platforms, emphasising the agreement’s relevance to strengthening trade relations and supporting sustainable development goals.

On January 20, 2025, during a working visit by Malaysian Prime Minister Anwar Ibrahim to Brussels, Malaysia and the EU announced the resumption of the negotiations on the free trade agreements. The first round of negotiations was held in Brussels from June 30 to July 4, 2025, followed by the second round in November 2025 (in Kuala Lumpur) and the third in January 2026 (in Brussels). The negotiation topics include: market access, digital trade, energy, raw materials, sanitary and phytosanitary (SPS) procedures, sustainable food systems, intellectual property rights (including Geographical Indications), and trade and sustainable development (TSD) regulations. A fourth round took place in Kuala Lumpur from 8 to 12 June 2026 and closed the chapters on customs and trade facilitation, trade remedies and good regulatory practices. In October 2026 Malaysian trade minister Johari Abdul Ghani said the talks would likely be finished by June 2027, although a few issues were still open.

== See also ==
- Malaysia–European Union relations
