= Malaysia Defence Industry Council =

- Logo of the Malaysian Defence Industry Council.
- Abbreviation: MDIC
- Formation: 1999
- Legal status: Government Bodies
- Region served: Malaysia
- Website: mip.mod.gov.my

The Malaysia Defence Industry Council (MDIC), formed in August, 1999, is tasked with coordinating the orderly development of the Malaysia Defence Industry Sector. It is chaired by the Malaysian Minister of Defence, and involves 56 members from the private sector as well as from the Government. It functions to not only support the local development sector, but to market it to overseas buyers and help companies access foreign markets. It also aims to build relationships with other defence industries.

To try and further enhance the local defence industry, the Malaysian Government has decided to broaden the goals of the council. It has been renamed in 2010 the Malaysian Industry Council for Defence Enforcement and Security (MIDES), in line with its new functions.
