= List of Malaysian inventions and discoveries =

This is a list of Malaysian inventions details the indigenous arts and techniques, Malaysian inventions, Malaysian discoveries and contributions of the people of Malaysia — both ancient and modern state of Malaysia.

== Architecture ==
- Attap dwelling
- Five-foot way
- Malay house – A traditional Malay house prior to the arrival of foreign or modern influences.
- Rumah Panjang – A traditional Bornean house prior to the arrival of foreign or modern influences.
- Sino-Portuguese architecture – Colonial architecture of Malaysia, incorporating Malay, Chinese and European architectural styles.
- Surau – A building used by Malay people for worship and religious instruction. Generally smaller physical structures than a mosque but has similar functions.

== Clothing ==
- Baju Kurung
- Baju Melayu
- Kebaya
- Malaysian batik
- Pua Kumbu
- Sarong
- Songket
- Songkok
- Tengkolok
- Tudung

== Game ==
- Batu Seremban – A popular Malay game
- Congkak – A Malay traditional mancala that is often played as indoor activities. Congkak may have been spread from Malacca, as Malacca was once an important trading port of the Malay Archipelago.
- Gasing – A popular Malay game since the time of the Sultanate of Malacca in the 15th century. The game was usually played at the end of the rice harvest.
- Gasing Pangkah – A competitive Malay game of gasing in which two or more players compete to strike each other's gasing out of a circle or to make it fall over and stop spinning.
- Rimau – A Malay abstract strategy board game.
- Wau – An intricately designed kite that is traditionally flown in Kelantan, and one of the national symbols of Malaysia.

== Literature ==
- Dunging script – An alternative script for Iban language that was invented by Dunging Anak Gunggu in 1947.
- Hikayat Hang Tuah – Classical Malay literature that tells the tale of the legendary Malay warrior, Hang Tuah and his four warrior companions – Hang Jebat, Hang Kasturi, Hang Lekir and Hang Lekiu – who lived during the height of the Sultanate of Malacca in the 15th century.
- Jawi script – An alternative script for Malay language and several other languages of Malay world, such as Acehnese, Banjarese, Minangkabau and Tausūg. The oldest remains of Malay using the Jawi script have been found on the Terengganu Inscription Stone, dated 702 AH (1303 CE).
- Pantun – Pantun is a form of traditional oral expression. The first examples to be recorded appear in Sejarah Melayu and Hikayat Hang Tuah.
- Sejarah Melayu – Classical Malay literature that tells the romanticised history of the origin, growth and collapse of the Sultanate of Malacca.

== Medicine ==
- Bomoh
- Pawang
- Ramuan
- Susuk

== Music ==
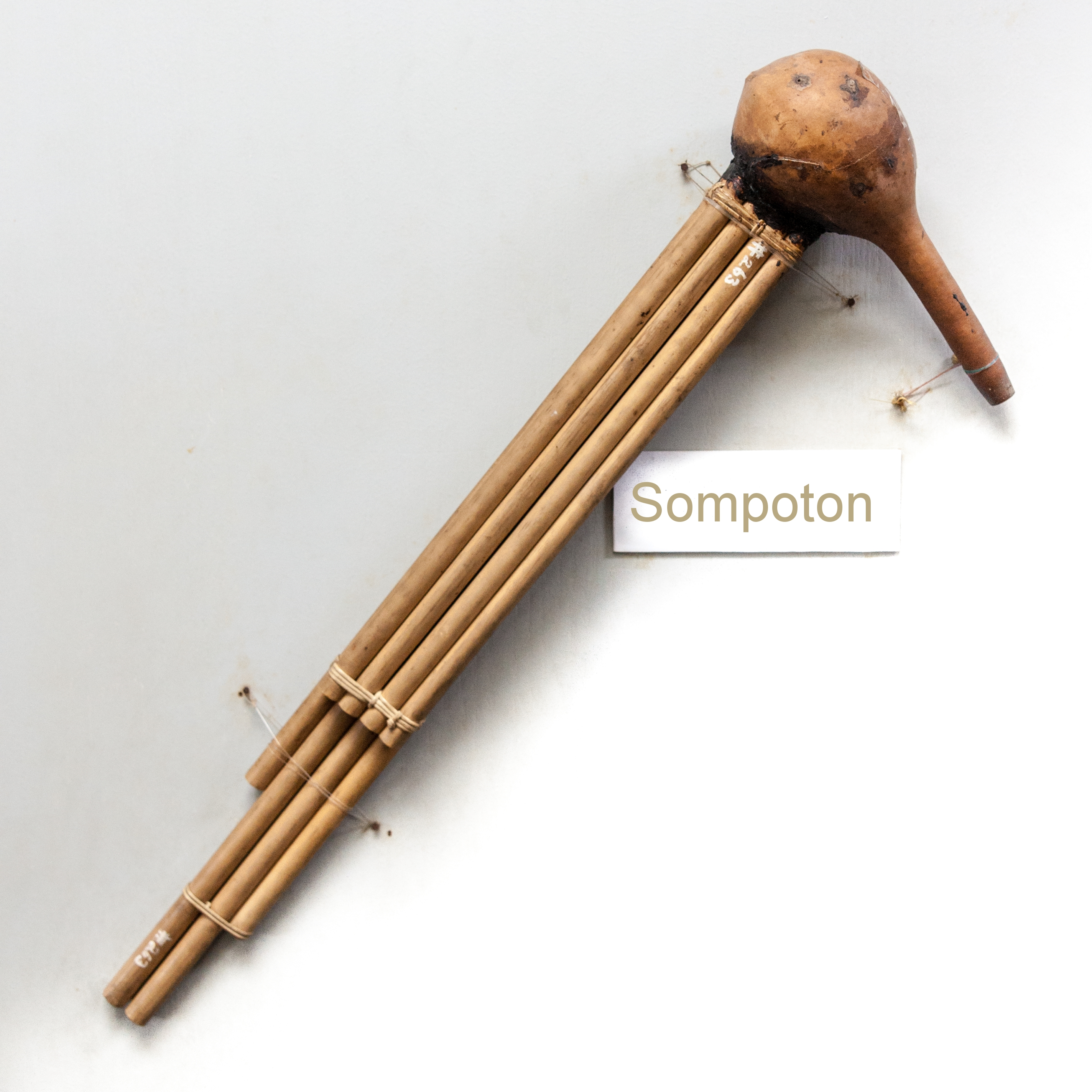
A sompoton

- Bungkau – Invented by the indigenous people of Dusun in Sabah, a type of jaw harp instruments.
- Dondang Sayang
- Gambus – Invented by the Malay people in Johor.
- Gendang
- Kertok
- Krem
- Kulintangan
- Mak Yong
- Malay ghazal
- Rebana
- Sapeh – Invented by the indigenous people of Orang Ulu in Sarawak, a type of traditional string instrument.
- Seruling
- Sompoton – Invented by the indigenous people of Dusun in Sabah, a type of mouth organ instruments.

== Philosophy ==
- Adat – Adat Temenggung and Adat perpatih, two variants of Malay customary practices and tradition observed in Malaysia.
- Duit Raya – A custom of giving out money to the guests during the festival of Hari Raya.
- Gawai – Gawai Dayak is an annual festival celebrated by the Dayak people in Sarawak, Malaysia and West Kalimantan, Indonesia on 1 and 2 June. It is a public holiday in Sarawak and is both a religious and a social occasion recognised since 1957.
- Islam Hadhari – A modern idea that emphasises the importance of progress with an Islamic perspective in terms of economic, social, and political fields, as well as diversity and tolerance.
- Kaamatan – Kaaamatan or Pesta kaamatan is a form of harvest festival celebrated annually in the state of Sabah in Malaysia. It is normally celebrated by the ethnic Kadazan-Dusuns, as well as by other related ethnic groups in the state, and lasts for the whole of the month of May, ending with a public holiday on a date selected by a priestess known as the bobohizan.
- Rukun Negara – A Malaysian declaration of national allegiance.
- Sembah – A Malay greeting and gesture as a way of demonstrating respect and reverence towards the royalties.
- Tajul Muluk – A system of geomancy that was practiced by the Malays. Dukun and bomoh who practice this knowledge would apply the principles of metaphysical and geomantic in the planning, development and construction of buildings.

== Ships ==
- Bajak – A type of sailing vessels of the Iban people of Sarawak.
- Bangkong – A type of war boats used by the Iban people of Sarawak.
- Bedar – A type of traditional sailing vessels from Terengganu.
- Buggoh – A type of small dugout canoe of the Sama-Bajau people of Sabah.
- Birau – A type of small dugout canoe of the Sama-Bajau people of Sabah.
- Jong – A type of ancient sailing vessels used by Malay sailors.
- Ghali – A type of galley-like ships in Malay Archipelago.
- Ghurab – A type of merchant and warship in Malay Archipelago.
- Kakap – A narrow river or coastal fishing boat in Malay Archipelago.
- Kolek – A traditional fishing boat from Kelantan.
- Lancang – A type of sailing vessels used in Malay Archipelago.
- Lancaran – A type of sailing vessel used in Malay Archipelago.
- Lepa – A traditional boat used by Sama-Bajau people in Sabah.
- Pelang – A traditional boat in Malay Archipelago.
- Pencalang – A traditional merchant ship from Malay Peninsula.
- Penjajap – A type of boats used to carry goods along rivers and coastline in Malay Archipelago.
- Perahu payang – A traditional fishing boat from Terengganu.
- Perahu tambangan
- Pinas – A type of traditional sailing vessels from Terengganu.
- Sampan panjang – A type of fast boats used by Orang Laut in Malay Archipelago.
- Tongkang – A type of boats used to carry goods along rivers and coastline in Malay Archipelago.

== Sports ==
- Rugby Tens – A Malaysian variant of the rugby union.
- Sepak Takraw – It was known as Sepak Raga and was mostly played by the royal court of Sultanate of Malacca in the 15th century. By 1940, the net version of the game was popularised by Malaysia and spread across Southeast Asia and formal rules and regulations were formed for the game.
- Silat – A combative art of self-defence originated in the Malay Archipelago. Silat also has evolved into a practice of physical and spiritual training also encompassing traditional Malay attire, musical instruments and customs.
- Jombola – A racket sport similar to pickleball developed by Sukdev Singh from Kuala Lumpur in 2006.

== Technology ==
- Automatic egg boiler – Invented by Hew Ah Kow, a detachable 4-piece plastic ware.
- Bakakuk – Invented by indigenous people in the state of Sabah, a homemade shotgun used for hunting wild animals and protect traditional farms of the local natives.
- Flipper toothbrush cover – Invented by Goo Yock Tee and Tang Peng Kee, a unique and globally-patented one-touch mechanism flips open/close automatically in response to the gentle tug or push of the toothbrush.
- Greener/cheaper water dispensers – Invented by Ooi Seng Chye, a water dispensing machine which processes raw sewage water into clean drinking water through reverse osmosis method.
- Lytro camera – Invented by Ren Ng, a camera technology to solves the problem of unfocused photos.
- Nehemiah walls – Nehemiah Lee hailed from Kluang, Johor. He completed his civil engineering degree in Malaysia before he went on to complete his master's degree in the United States. In 1977, Nehemiah went back to Malaysia to serve in the irrigation and drainage department. In 1993, he started a company that design, construct its own patented reinforced soil retaining wall system which he named as "Nehemiah walls". As of 2015, the company constructed 1.5 million square metres of walls in Malaysia, occupying 60% of the Malaysian market share with annual sales ranging from RM 30 million to RM 60 million from 2010 to 2015. His business also expanded to Singapore, Sri Lanka, Bangladesh, and India.
- Rainbow Loom – Cheong Choon Ng was born in Taiping, Perak. He emigrated to United States and graduated as a mechanical engineer. He also obtained a US citizenship. During his stay at the United States, he invented and commercialised a plastic device for turning small rubber bands into jewelry and other products.
- Rubber stamp machine – Robest Yong was born and raised in Georgetown, Penang. He went on to become a technician with a Japanese company from 1976 to 1989 before he resigned and venture into business. In 1991, he patented a machine to make rubber stamp faster which only takes five minutes when compared to the plaster molds method which can take weeks to make a rubber stamp. He brought the invention to Geneva International Invention Exhibition, Switzerland and won a gold medal. He received 100 orders immediately after the exhibition. The machine cost around RM 3,800 and was marketed in Russia, Japan, the United States, and Africa.
- Single chip USB flash drive – Pua Khein-Seng was born and raised in Sekinchan, Selangor. He graduated from a Taiwanese university as an electrical engineer and co-founded a Taiwanese company named Phison with four other colleagues in 2000. In 2001, the company developed a USB system on a chip (SoC) design that uses a single chip instead of multiple chips used by its competitors. In 2012, the company also opened an electronics research and development (R&D) centre in Penang. For his contribution to the electronics industry in the state of Penang, Pua was awarded the title Datuk by the governor of Penang in the same year. However, the centre stopped all R&D activities by 2016. In 2019, Pua decided to close the research centre. Pua attributed the failure to lack of talents in Malaysia and lack of enthusiasm by local engineers. Apart from Pua Khein-Seng, other companies such as M-Systems from Israel, Shimon Shmueli, an employee from IBM, Trek 2000 International from Singapore, and Netac Technology from China also staked the claim as the inventor of flash drive.
