= Innovation in Malaysia =

Innovation in Malaysia describes trends and developments in innovation in Malaysia. Malaysia ranked 34th among 139 countries in Global Innovation Index 2025.

== Background ==
In 1971, Malaysia transitioned to export-oriented industrialisation. This policy change led multinational companies to relocate to Malaysia, causing Malaysia to become one of the leading exporters of electrical and manufactured goods in the world, and is highly integrated in global trade, accounting for 6.6% of the world's export of integrated circuits and other electrical components in 2014, according to the World Trade Organization (WTO). Manufacturing contributed 60% of Malaysia's total exports in 2010. followed by oil and gas and palm oil. Malaysia is the world's second-biggest producer of palm oil. From 2010 to 2015, the share of manufacturing and high-tech industries in Malaysian GDP has declined gradually due to concomitant growth in services, which is a natural consequence of the growth of the electronics industry in Malaysia. However, high-tech services was neglected during the process, with less value being added to manufactured goods over time. As a result, the Malaysian trade surplus reduced from 2009 to 2013 from RM 144,529 to RM 91,539 with a reduction in high-tech exports. Malaysian share of global added value in high-tech manufacturing has slipped from 0.8% in 2007 to 0.6% in 2013. Over the same period, Malaysia's global share of high-tech exports (goods and services) contracted from 4.6% to 3.5%.

Malaysia is heavily reliant on revenues from oil and gas, which contributed 32% to the federal government's coffers. A sharp drop in oil prices in 2014 forced the Malaysian government to maintain a 3% budget deficit in 2015.

Income inequality is also a major concern in Malaysia. Therefore, the Malaysian government introduced the Subsidy Rationalisation programme from 2010 to 2014, where natural gas subsidies were removed in stages. Meanwhile, Goods and Services Tax was introduced in 2015. Social and environmental risks include health-related problems such as a rise in Dengue cases in 2013, water shortages due to pollution and overuse, natural disasters such as landslides due to land clearing, low farm productivity, environmental problems and monetary inflation. According to the World Resources Institute, Malaysia contributed about 0.9% of global greenhouse gas emissions in 2012, taking into account land-use changes and forestry. Recurrent crises have pushed the government to shift expenditure towards addressing socio-economic problems. Other issues include governance issues and weak institutional capabilities in science and technology.

The ratio of students enrolled in Science, technology, engineering, and mathematics (STEM) and non-STEM subjects has increased from 25:75 in 2000 to 42:58 in 2013. However, the quality of education has declined over the years. Programme for International Student Assessment (PISA) assessment in 2012 revealed that the performance of 15-year-olds in Malaysia in Mathematics and Science is below average. Only one out of 100 15-year-olds in Malaysia can solve complex problems, compared to one out of five students in Singapore, the Republic of Korea and Japan.

In 2015, the Malaysian government estimated that 6% annual growth would be necessary to reach high-income status by 2020. Thus, a higher focus on innovation is necessary to achieve this goal. It's more than the average for the previous decade and average for 2016–2019 (4.8%), according to the World Bank. The National Transformation Programme (NTP) was introduced in 2009, followed by the Economic Transformation Programme (ETP) in 2010. ETP laid the foundation for the implementation of the Tenth Malaysia Plan (2011 to 2015). ETP seeks to improve public sector efficiency, improve governance, strengthen industrial competitiveness and raise investment. It focused on 12 growth areas, including electronics and electrical goods, oil and gas, palm oil and rubber and other sectors. The private sector would finance 92% of the ETP programme.

Malaysia's National Transformation Policy 2050 was introduced in 2017. It placed greater emphasis on science and technology, especially (STEM), and Industry 4.0 technologies like nanotechnology. It also emphasised a shift towards the use of green energy, such as solar, biomass and wind. In 2018, the Ministry of International Trade and Industry published its "Industry4WRD: National Policy on Industry 4.0". This policy aims to digitise manufacturing and services and adopt smart manufacturing. Amid COVID-19 pandemic in July 2020, "Smart Automation Grant" was launched to help firms digitalise their business processes. In February 2021, 66 SMEs and mid-tier firms in various sectors were awarded the grant. Malaysia's 2020 budget incentivises e-wallets and other cashless payment systems to boost e-commerce in the country. A total of RM 1.1 billion (US$270 million) was allocated in the 2020 budget to five economic development corridors in the country. Artificial intelligence roadmap (2021–2025) was introduced in August 2022, followed by AITalent Roadmap (2024–2030) in May 2024.

== Research ==
"Average GDP per capita" (purchasing power parity, PPP) versus "gross domestic expenditure on R&D" (GERD) as a share of GDP [GERD/GDP] in Malaysia and other countries from 2010 to 2013. Malaysia's average GDP per capita (PPP) stood at 21,829.3 US dollars. Meanwhile, the GERD/GDP ratio stood at 1.13%. Source: UNESCO Science Report: towards 2030 (2015), Figure 12.4

Basic research falls under the purview of Ministry of Education (MoE) while applied research falls under the Ministry of Science, Technology and Innovation (MosTI). There is no mechanism for coordinating basic and applied research. MoSTI monitors innovation through surveys, number of grant applications, but lacks the exposure to monitor the coordination of industrial grants. The Malaysian government had created various funds and grant schemes since 1997, covering all stages of product development from pre-seed funding, research and development (R&D) to commercialisation. In 2014, cross-disciplinary research grants were introduced to promote innovation not only in scientific sectors but also in terms of achieving Sustainable Development Goals (SDG). However, there was no systematic approach to monitoring the fund disbursement, progression and performance of R&D and prevention of duplication, although National Science Research Council proposed a central independent agency to coordinate R&D activities in 2014.

The Malaysian government had produced several policies related to science, technology and innovation (STI), such as "First Science and Technology Policy" in 1986, "Action Plan for Industrial Technology Development" in 1991, "Second Science and Technology Policy" (2002–2010), and "Third Science and Technology Policy" (2013–2020). However, the latest policy is still addressing many of the targets outlined in the first policy.

In 2008, the Malaysian government established the International Centre for South–South Cooperation in Science, Technology and Innovation, under the purview of UNESCO which focuses on institutional building in the Global South. The creation of the ASEAN Economic Community in 2015 aims to encourage scientific co-operation among member countries in Southeast Asia. Newton-Ungku Omar fund was established in 2015 as a result of co-operation between Malaysia and United Kingdom for funding energy-efficient and renewable energy assets.

=== Public investment ===
Between 2008 and 2012, research spending rose from 0.79% to 1.13% of GDP. GDP grew steadily over the same period. Malaysia plans to raise this ratio to 2% of GDP by 2020. However, research spending to GDP ratio reduced to 0.95% in 2020 due to COVID-19 pandemic.

Although research spending increased to 1.44% of GDP in 2016, the government has since trimmed or eliminated several funding schemes, including the Long Term Research Grant Scheme, the Transcendental Research Grant Scheme and the Fundamental Research Grant Scheme for universities.

In February 2021, the Ministry of Science, Technology and Innovation launched the Malaysia Grand Challenge to encourage disruptive innovation and reduce reliance on foreign technologies. This body allocates funds to start-ups and SMEs through the following five new mechanisms to help them commercialize their products and services: the Strategic Research Fund, Technology Development Funds 1 and 2 (TeD 1 and TeD 2), a Bridging Fund and an Applied Innovation Fund (Yunus).

=== Private investment ===
Research and development (R&D) are conducted predominantly in large-scale enterprises in the electronics, automotive and chemical industries. Small and medium-sized enterprises, which make up 97% of all private firms, contribute little. This is because most of the small and medium-sized enterprises that work as subcontractors for multinational firms have remained confined to the role of original equipment manufacturers.

Foreign multinational firms are generally engaged in more sophisticated R&D than national firms. However, even the R&D conducted by foreign firms tends to be confined to process and product improvements, rather than pushing the boundaries of the technology frontier. Moreover, foreign multinationals are heavily dependent on their parent and subsidiary firms based outside Malaysia for personnel, owing to the lack of qualified human capital and research universities within Malaysia to call upon.

A group of ten multinationals has decided to address these shortcomings. To satisfy the research needs of the electrical and electronics industries, Agilent Technologies, Intel, Motorola Solutions, Silterra and six other multinationals established a platform in 2012 to promote Collaborative Research in Engineering, Science and Technology (CREST). These multinational firms spend nearly MYR 1.4 billion on research and development. They also utilized government research grants extensively after the Malaysian government decided to open up grant applications for these multinational companies in 2005.

=== Endogenous research ===
In 2006, the Malaysian government established five research universities namely: Universiti Malaya, Universiti Sains Malaysia, Universiti Kebangsaan Malaysia, Universiti Putra Malaysia, and Universiti Teknologi Malaysia, in "Higher Education Strategic Plan beyond 2020". These universities received 71% increase in government funding. As of 2011, the Malaysian government allocated 2.2% of its GDP to higher education. Between 2008 and 2011, 30.3% of scientific publications focused on engineering, followed by biological sciences (15.6%), chemistry (13.4%), medical sciences (12.0%) and physics (8.7%). Scientific publications from Malaysia generated an average of 0.8 citations per paper in 2010. Malaysia occupies 8.4% of the top 10% most cited papers from 2008 to 2012.

By financing graduate study, the government helped to double the enrolment in PhD programs between 2007 and 2010 to 22,000. The number of international university students has been increasing from 2007 to 2012 to more than 56,000. The majority of the international students come from China, Indonesia, Iran, and Pakistan. According to the UNESCO Institute for Statistics, the number of full-time equivalent (FTE) researchers in Malaysia tripled between 2008 and 2012 (from 16,345 to 52,052), carrying the researcher density to 1 780 per million inhabitants in 2012, which was well above the global average for 2013 (1,083 per million). By 2016, there were 2,397 researchers per million inhabitants in Malaysia, almost double the global average (1,368 per million). However, Singapore absorbs 57% of the Malaysian diaspora, with a skilled labour force being three times higher than 20 years ago in the diaspora pool in 2007. The Malaysian government launched Talent Corp and targeted the "Returning Expert Programme" in 2009. From 2011 to 2015, a total of 2,500 returnees registered for the scheme.

=== Rate of return on research ===
Even though patent applications with the Malaysian patent office have increased steadily over the years to 7,205 in 2013, the number of patents still insufficient when compared to competitors such as the Republic of Korea (204,589 patents in 2013). Besides, there is little return on investment in R&D. The low commercialization rate can largely be attributed to a lack of university–industry collaboration, rigidities in research organizations, and problems with coordinating policies. Universities seem to confine the commercialization of their research results to specific areas, such as health and information and communication technologies. Domestic applications also seem to be of lower quality than those of foreign applicants, with a cumulative grants-to-application ratio of 18% between 1989 and 2014, against 53% for foreign applicants over the same period. The Malaysian Institute of Micro-electronic Systems, Malaysia's forefront public R&D institute, which was corporatized in 1992, contributed 45–50% of Malaysia's patents filed in 2010 but the low citations that have emerged from those patents suggest that the commercialization rate is low.

In 2010, the government established the Malaysian Innovation Agency to spur the commercialization of research. Five years after its inception, the Malaysian Innovation Agency had made a limited impact on commercialization thus far, owing to the unclear delineation of its role in relation to the Ministry of Science, Technology and Innovation and the agency's limited resources. Nevertheless, there are some successes in driving commercialisation as evidenced by a survey done by Malaysian Science and Technology Information Centre in 2012 where 82% of companies in the manufacturing sector and 80% of companies in the services sector engaged in in-house R&D while the remaining firms engaged in R&D joint ventures with other firms.

Malaysian Technology Development Corporation helps companies to translate research output into viable products. However, only a few players achieved commercial success, such as the Malaysian Palm Oil Board, the Rubber Research Institute of Malaysia, Universiti Putra Malaysia, and Universiti Sains Malaysia.

Malaysian Palm Oil Board is a public body born of the merger of the Palm Oil Research Institute of Malaysia and the Palm Oil Registration and Licensing Authority in 2000, by act of parliament. Through a tax levied on every tonne of palm oil and palm kernel oil produced in the country, the oil palm industry funds many of the research grants provided by the Malaysian Palm Oil Board. These grants amounted to MYR 2.04 billion (circa US$565 million) between 2000 and 2010. Its research into biomass has led to the development of wood and paper products, fertilizers, bio-energy sources, polyethylene sheeting for use in vehicles, and other products made of palm biomass.

== Sectors ==
=== High-tech ===
Over 2016–2019, the direct contribution of nanotechnology to the economy was estimated at MYR 3.5 billion (ca US$ 800 million). The volume of scientific publications on nanotechnology rose by 14% over the 2012–2019 period. Malaysia contributed 0.64% of global output in this field in 2011 and 0.67% in 2019.

As of 2026, Malaysia has 13% market share in the global Outsource Semiconductor Assembly and Testing (OSAT) market. However, there is lack of Malaysian representation in the global advanced packaging market. Therefore, in March 2026, Malaysian government provided RM 92 million in R&D funding through the Malaysia Science Endowment (MSE) trust fund for five local companies that form the "Malaysia Advanced Packaging Consortium". An additional matching contribution from the industry, valued at RM93.8 million, brought the total contribution to RM185.8 million, covering the 2-year research programme. This initiative aims to capture 7% of the global advanced packaging market by 2035.

=== Sustainability ===
Over 2018–2020, the government launched four large-scale solar projects with capacity of 500–1 228 MW, two of which were operational by 2020. Contractors hired as part of all three projects were bound to include at least one national player. In 2019, the Sustainability Energy Development Authority began implementing the MySuria programme to install 3-kW solar photovoltaic systems in 1,620 households from the bottom-40% income group.

In 2018, the government launched a campaign to eliminate the use of plastics and actively support the recycling of biowaste. The government also committed to reviewing the construction of new dams, owing to environmental concerns.

== Sources ==
This article incorporates text from a free content work. Licensed under CC-BY-SA IGO 3.0. Text taken from UNESCO Science Report: towards 2030, UNESCO Publishing.

== See also ==
- Economy of Malaysia
- Science and technology in Malaysia
- List of Malaysian inventions and discoveries
