= French submarine Ouessant (S623) =

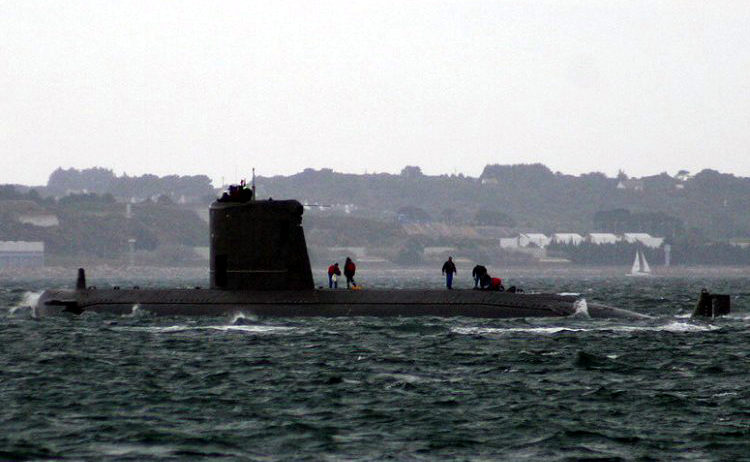
- Ouessant at Brest in 2005

History

France
- Name: Ouessant
- Namesake: Ushant, an island in the English Channel
- Builder: Arsenal de Cherbourg
- Launched: 23 October 1976
- Decommissioned: 2001
- Fate: Training submarine, 2005–2009
- Status: Submarine museum, 2011-present

General characteristics
- Class & type: Agosta-class submarine (Agosta 70A)
- Displacement: 1,500 long tons (1,524 t) surfaced; 1,760 long tons (1,788 t) submerged
- Length: 67 m (219 ft 10 in)
- Beam: 6 m (19 ft 8 in)
- Speed: 12 knots (22 km/h; 14 mph) surfaced; 20.5 knots (38.0 km/h; 23.6 mph) submerged; 10.5 knots (19.4 km/h; 12.1 mph) submerged (snort)
- Test depth: 300 m (984 ft 3 in)
- Complement: 5 officers; 36 enlisted
- Sensors & processing systems: Thomson CSF DRUA 33 Radar; Thomson Sintra DSUV 22; DUUA 2D Sonar; DUUA 1D Sonar; DUUX 2 Sonar; DSUV 62A towed array
- Armament: SM 39 Exocet; 4 × 550 mm bow torpedo tubes; ECAN L5 Mod 3 & ECAN Fl7 Mod 2 torpedoes

Ouessant (S623) is an Agosta-class submarine built for the French Navy.

== Construction and career ==
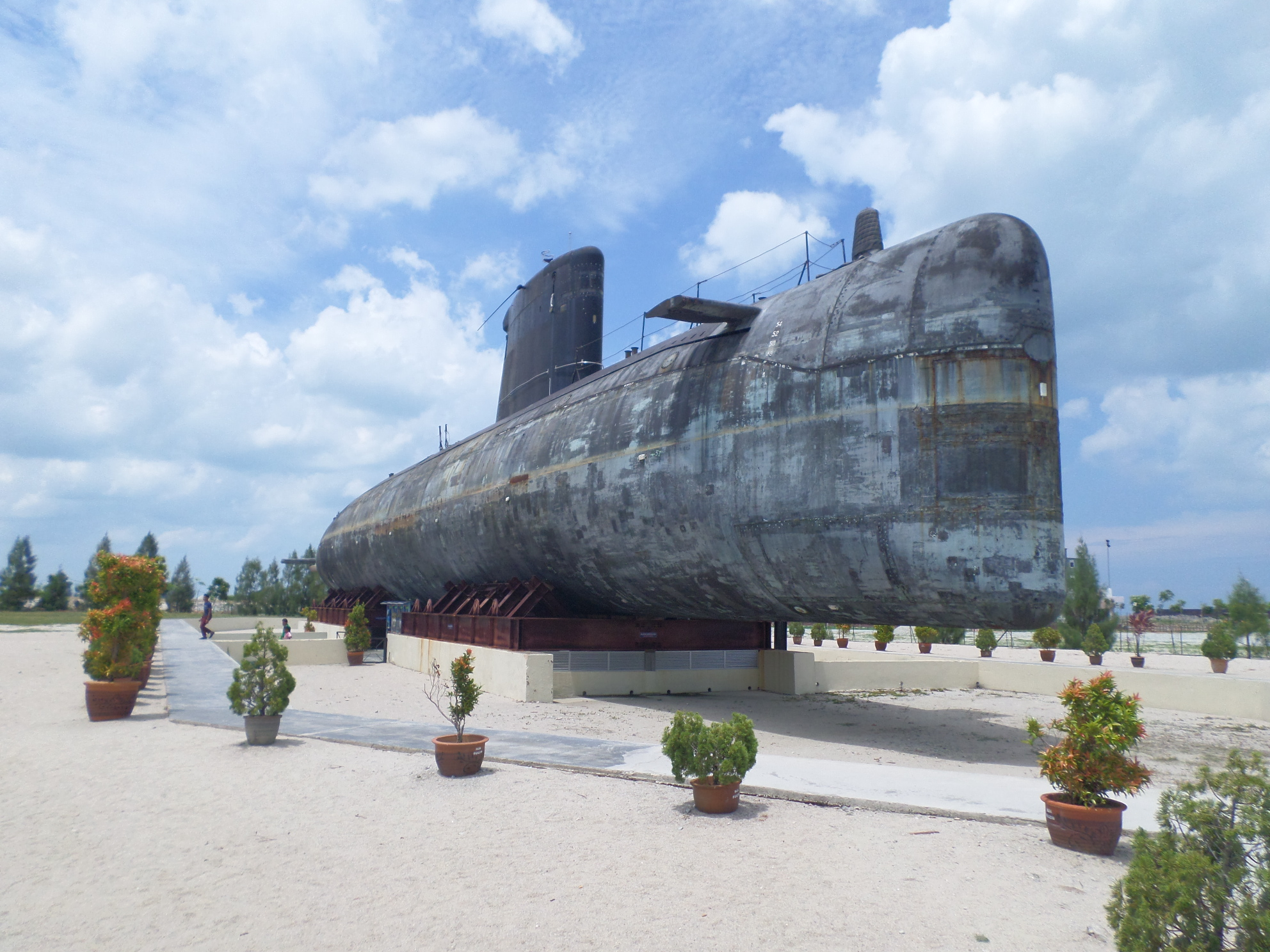
Submarine Museum, ex-Ouessant (S623)

She was completed at the Arsenal de Cherbourg in 1978 and served the French Navy until her 2001 decommissioning. From 2005 to 2009, Ouessant was employed as a training vessel to train Royal Malaysian Navy personnel who will operate the two French-built Scorpène-class submarines planned for the Royal Malaysian Navy. Despite official statements in 2009 that Ouessant had been sold to Malaysia, the position remained unclear. Because of Ouessant's role in the establishment of the Malaysian submarine forces, plans to return the vessel to Malaysia to serve as a museum ship were announced in July 2009.; Ouessant was formally transferred to the Malaysian Government on 23 September 2011 to be transported to Klebang, Malacca to become a submarine museum.

== See also ==
- List of submarines of France
