= Impian kite =

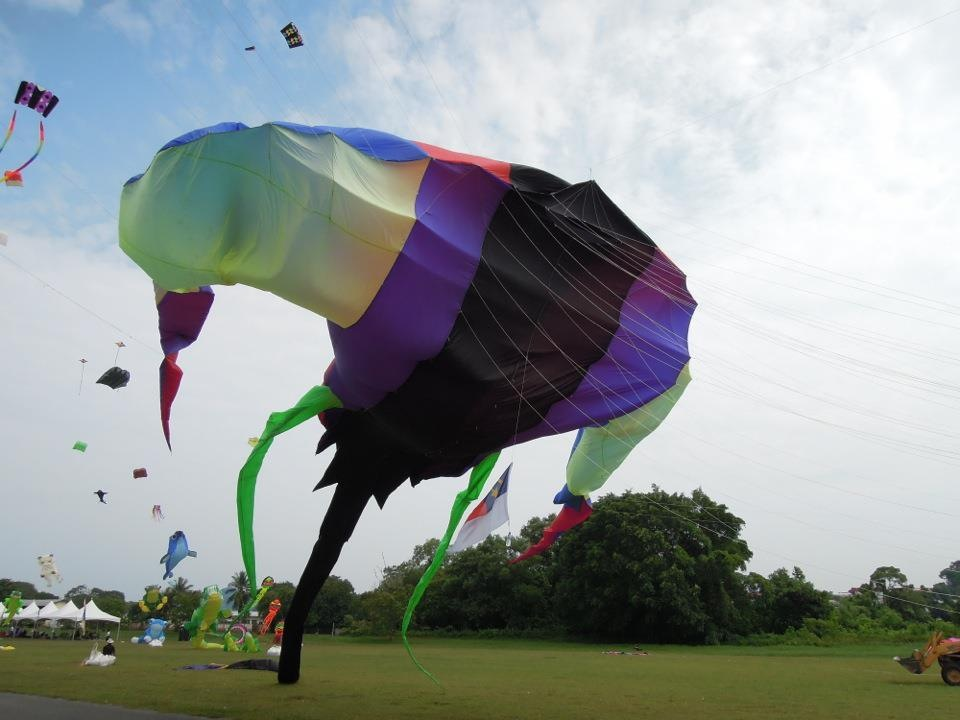
Malaysia's largest inflatable kite

Impian Kite is Malaysia’s largest hand-made inflatable kite. Since 2004, it has been listed as such in Malaysia's Book of Records, measuring 16.7 by 36.4 metres (55 ft × 119 ft).

The kite was made by a group of friends in Melaka and Malacca.

Unable to buy a super-sized kite, this group sewed one themselves using a small automatic Singer sewing machine. Designed by only pieces of papers and imagination, and majority sewn by the main person, Edmund Cheong. Part of the team at that time, Lim Kok Tiong, Koh Hong Guan, Chong Swee Ching, Lee Poh Choon and Nicholas Cheong contributed in part of the idea, sewing and materials, space and also time.

Today, the team is known as Team Impian, a group of kite flying friends, flies regularly at Pantai Klebang. The team regularly flies at Bintulu Kite Festival, also known as Borneo International Kite Festival, Bintulu.

== Gallery ==
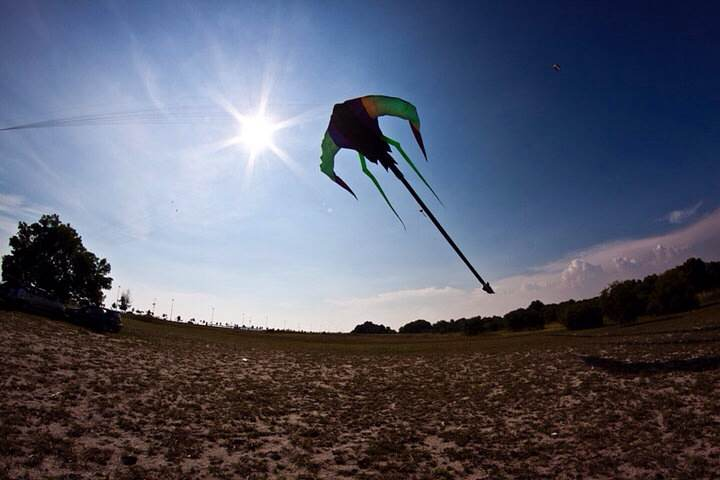
flying at impian kite flying field

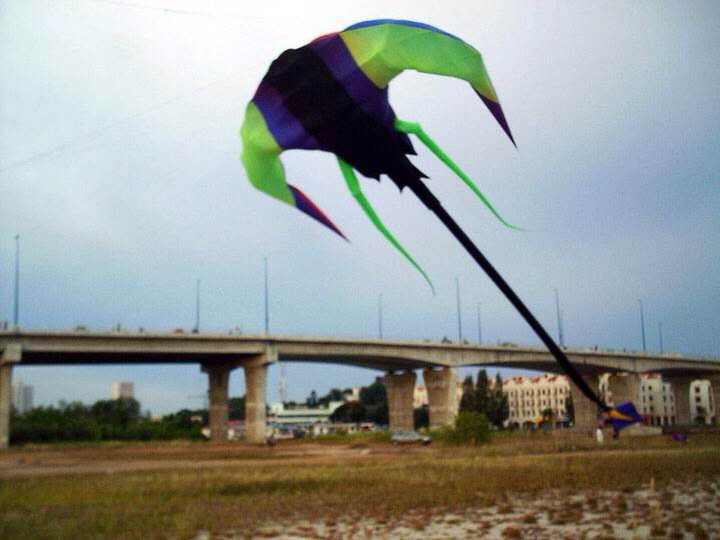
flying at impian kite flying field

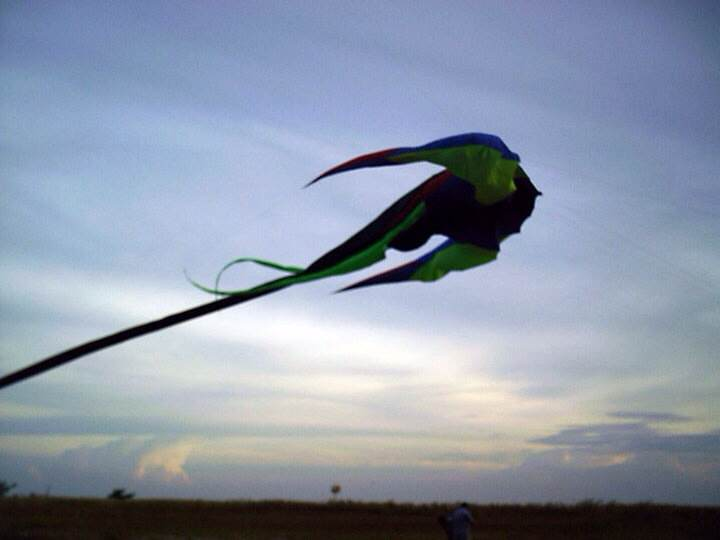
flying at impian kite flying field

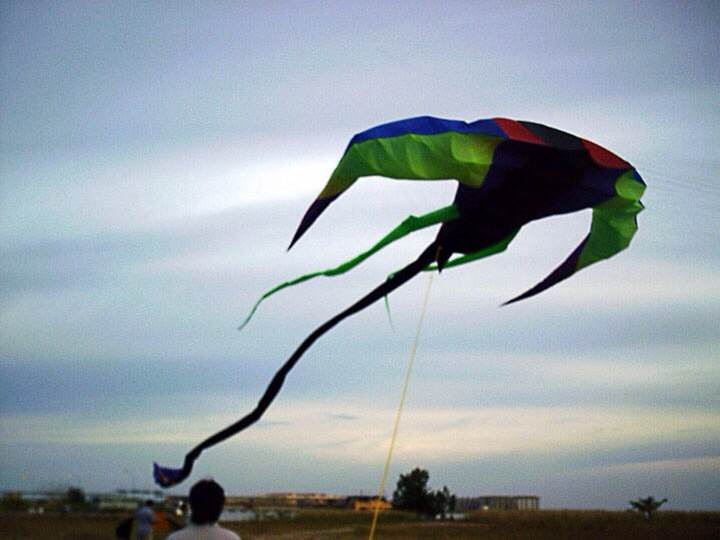
flying at impian kite flying field

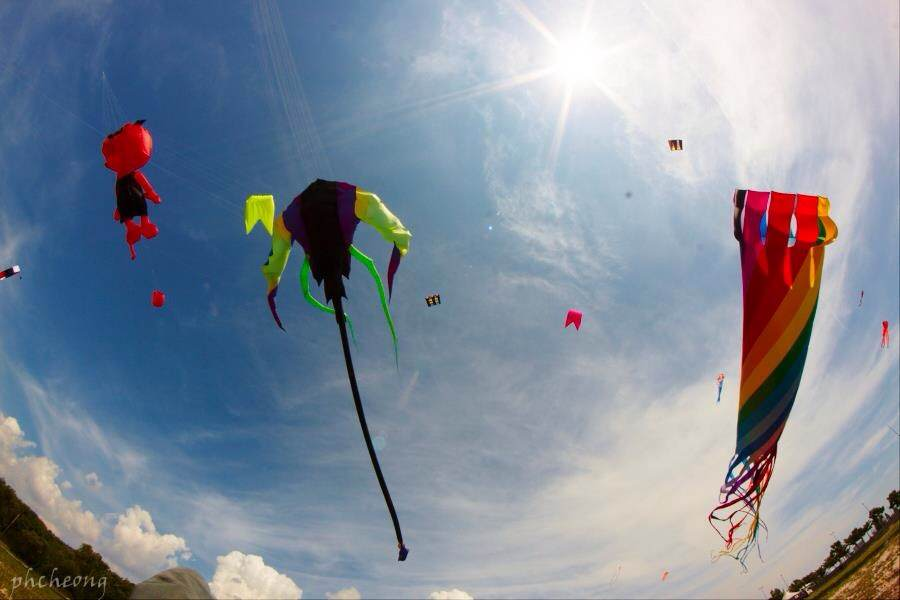
flying at impian kite flying field

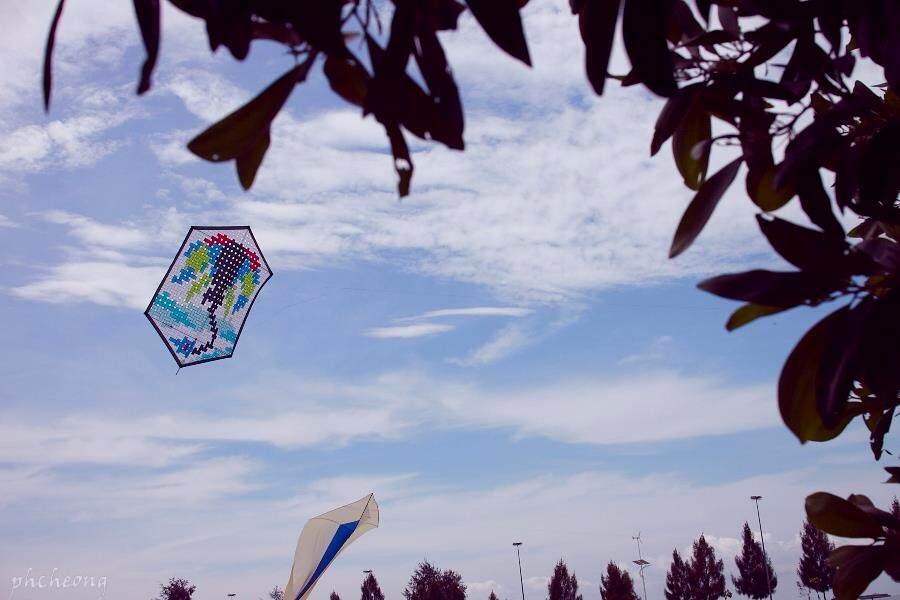
Design by Koh Hong Guan, Crafted by Eric Siaw

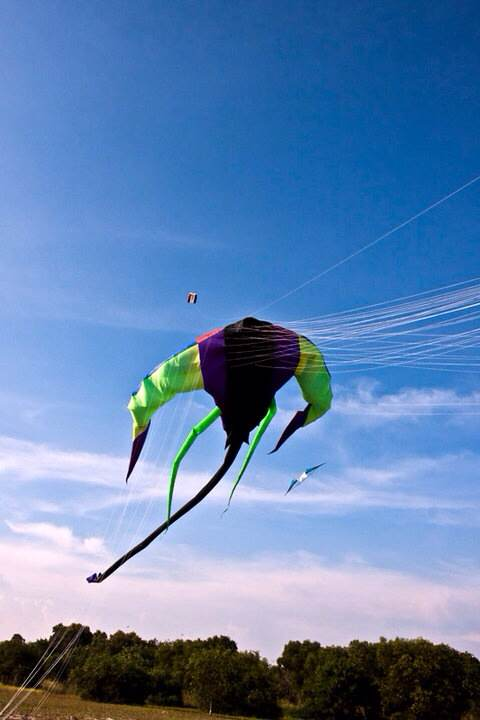
flying at impian kite flying field

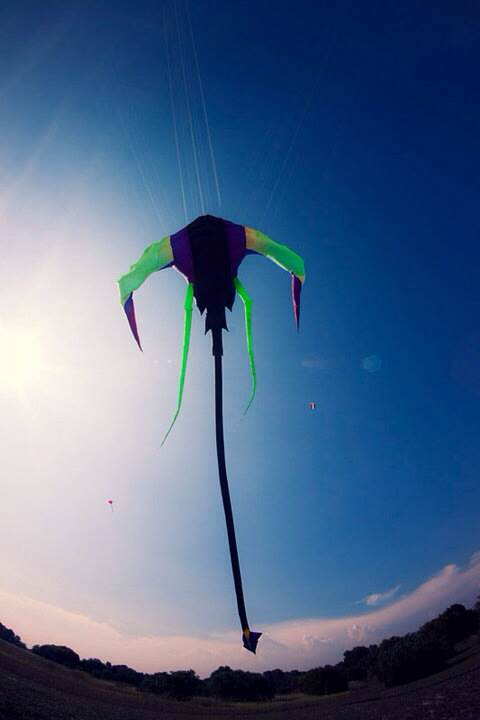
flying at impian kite flying field

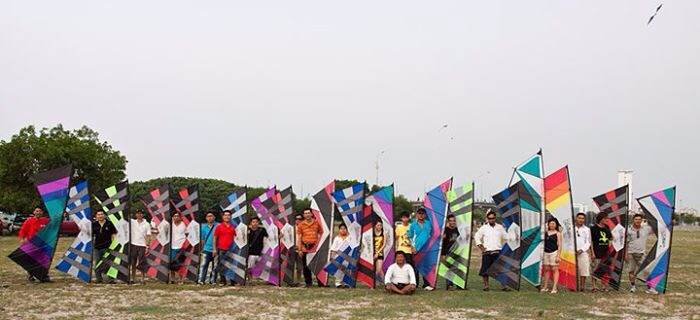
flying at impian kite flying field
