= Limbongan–Klebang Highway =

Road in Malacca, Malaysia

Melaka Route {{{route}}}

Route information
- Length: 5.7 km (3.5 mi)

Location
- Country: Malaysia

Highway system
- Highways in Malaysia; Expressways; Federal; State

Limbongan–Klebang Highway is a major road in Malacca, Malaysia.

== Background ==
The highway is part of the Malacca Coastal Highway as the second phase.

On 23 July 2022, the parliament member of Kota Melaka, Khoo Poay Tiong, and state assembly member of Kota Laksamana, Low Chee Leong, demanded explanation from the Malacca state government over the no progress of last kilometer of the road for seven years. In 2015, the Chief Minister of Malacca at the time gave the developer the land title before the developer build the road.

== History ==
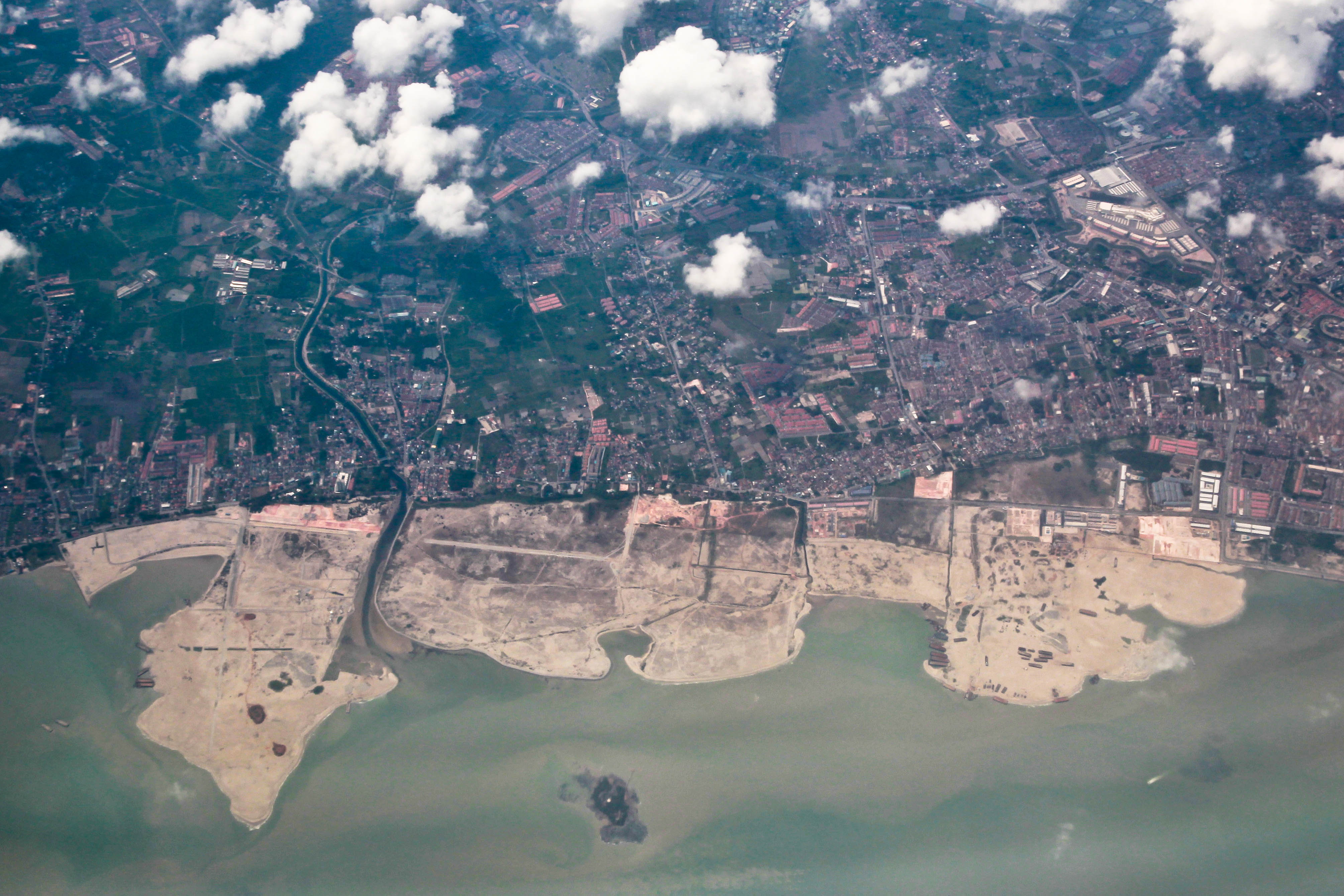

On 5 January 2012, the groundbreaking of the project was officiated by Chief Minister of Malacca, Mohd Ali Rustam. He said that the project costs 50 million ringgit and will be borne by private sector.

On 16 April 2015, the construction of the bridge which crosses the Klebang River was started. The bridge cost around 20 million ringgit.

On 17 July 2015, the road was opened access for vehicles, but with a few warning signs that mentioned driver's own risks for accidents on this road. On 20 July 2015, the state assembly member of Bachang pointed out that since the road had not been commissioned and had not been transferred to the local government, the insurance companies had the right not to compensate drivers for accidents on the road. On his visit, at the entrance from 1Malaysia Square roundabout, there was a warning sign which mentioned it is a private road and the developer is not responsible for accidents. He pointed out he road was not listed in the Malaysian Public Works Department's roads blueprint.

On 12 June 2025, a 1.5 kilometer road was opened for access.
