= Eugster/Frismag =

Swiss home appliance producer

- Type: Aktiengesellschaft
- Industry: Home appliances
- Founded: Amriswil, Switzerland, (1978)
- Founder: Arthur Eugster; Markus Eugster
- Headquarters: Amriswil (TG), Switzerland
- Key people: Arthur Eugster (CEO and head of the supervisory board)
- Products: Espresso machines
- Revenue: CHF 583,000,000 (2018)
- Number of employees: 3000 (2018)
- Website: www.eugster.ch

Eugster/Frismag AG, headquartered in Amriswil, Switzerland, is an OEM producer of home appliances, especially coffee machines which are sold under many international brand names. Eugster/Frismag manufactures around 20% of all Nestle machines as well as other machines for brands such as Jura, Keurig, Melitta, KitchenAid or Moulinex. The annual production totals 5 million coffee machines. Alongside Saeco, Eugster/Frismag is one of the world's largest producers of coffee machines.

Besides its three development and production locations in Switzerland (around 1,600 jobs) the company has a production facility in Portugal with 1100 jobs. An additional part is produced in China through a joint venture company. Eugster/Frismag is active solely as an OEM and doesn't sell products under its own brand. The family-owned company employs more than 3,000 individuals overall and had a revenue of 583 million Swiss francs in 2018.

== History ==
In 1976 Arthur Eugster started manufacturing electric home appliances such as egg cookers and waffle irons. In 1978, Arthur Eugster and his brother Markus founded the Frismag AG in Amriswil and began producing coffee machines. A commercial breakthrough came with a low-budget espresso machine that sold very well in the United States in 1984. In 1989 they established a subsidiary in Portugal for the assembly of automatic coffee machines. In the early 1990s additional production facilities were established in Switzerland, and in 1994 their first fully automatic coffee machine was launched. In 1995 the separate companies merged to form Eugster/Frismag AG and the group's headquarters relocated to Romanshorn. In 1997, Eugster/Frismag entered into a partnership in China for the production of drip brew machines, which was transferred to a joint venture company in 2005.
