= Capresso =

Swiss coffee-making equipment company

- Founded: United States, (1994)
- Headquarters: Montvale, New Jersey
- Key people: Richard Boynton, President; David Shull, Senior Vice President of Sales and Marketing
- Products: Coffeemakers, espresso machines, grinders, electric water kettles, frothers
- Website: www.capresso.com

Capresso markets high-end coffeemakers, espresso machines, grinders, electric water kettles, and frothers. The company is owned by Jura AG of Switzerland.

== History ==
Capresso, Inc. was founded in 1994 to introduce the American consumer to high-end Euro-style coffeemakers.

In 2002, Capresso, Inc. entered into a joint venture to market automatic coffee centers with Jura AG of Switzerland. Jura is a Swiss developer and distributor of automatic coffee centers, which it sells in over 50 countries.

In 2008, Jura AG became the sole owner and parent of all U.S. Capresso and Jura Capresso operations.

Richard Boynton became the President of Jura Capresso in 2008. In 2011, he was named the Chairman of the Board of Directors for the International Housewares Association for the 2011/2012 term of October 2011 through September 2012.

The name “Capresso” combines “cappuccino” and “espresso.”

== Company Firsts ==
Capresso is responsible for many industry firsts, including:

The first programmable coffeemaker/conical burr grinder combination.

The first automatic drip coffeemaker with a stainless steel thermal carafe and on-tap milk frother.

The first semi-automatic espresso machine designed for unprecedented convenience and ease.

The first burr grinder for home use with completely vertical grinding and a special design to minimize noise during grinding.

The first coffeemaker/conical burr grinder combination, with a stainless steel vacuum carafe.

The first automatic coffeemaker with a high-gloss metallic body, stainless-steel thermal carafe and stainless-steel lined heating system.

The first stand-alone automatic milk-frother on the consumer market.

The first burr grinder to feature a new and exclusive electronic sensor.

== See also ==
- Bialetti
