= Jura Elektroapparate =

Swiss manufacturer and distributor of espresso machines

- Type: Aktiengesellschaft
- Industry: Home appliances
- Founded: Niederbuchsiten, Switzerland in 1931
- Founder: Leo Henzirohs
- Headquarters: Niederbuchsiten, Switzerland
- Key people: Emanuel Probst (CEO)
- Products: Espresso machines
- Revenue: CHF 579.9 million (2020)
- Number of employees: 808 (2020)
- Website: www.jura.com

Jura, registered as Jura Elektroapparate AG is a Swiss developer and distributor of home appliances, mainly espresso machines, headquartered in Niederbuchsiten, Canton of Solothurn. The company was founded in 1931 by Leo Henzirohs. Formerly, Jura ran its own factory, but it has outsourced production since the 1990s.

Jura today focuses on fully automatic espresso machines. This core area originated in the early 1980s. A strong focus is laid on design and there are no low-budget machines.

The espresso machines are produced by Eugster/Frismag in Romanshorn, which also manufactures machines for other brands such as Siemens, Bosch and AEG.

Jura used to be well known as a producer of other home appliances too, especially clothes irons. At the end of 2008, Jura has generally ceased distributing its ironing product range.

The automatic espresso machines are distributed worldwide. In Germany, Austria, the Netherlands, France, Sweden, Spain, Poland, Russia, the United Kingdom, the United States, Canada, Australia, South Africa and China Jura has its own distribution companies or joint ventures. This is also the case for Central Eastern Europe. Jura's brand ambassador is Roger Federer. In 2006, Jura inaugurated the visitor's centre "JURAworld of Coffee" at the Niederbuchsiten headquarters.

== Subsidiaries ==
- Capresso - since 2008
