= 1Malaysia =

Former political slogan and programme

1Malaysia official logo

1Malaysia (pronounced One Malaysia in English and Satu Malaysia in Malay) was a political slogan coined by former Prime Minister Najib Razak in 2009. The Initiative was intended to promote ethnic harmony, national unity, and governance reform. Over time, the concept became the subject of public debate and controversy.

After the 2018 Malaysian general election, in which the Barisan National government was defeated by Pakatan Harapan in the 2018 Malaysian general election, Najib Razak was removed from office. The concept was abolished and replaced with Sayangi Malaysiaku, a concept created by Mahathir Mohamad, alongside other significant changes made by his government during his premiership.

== Overview ==
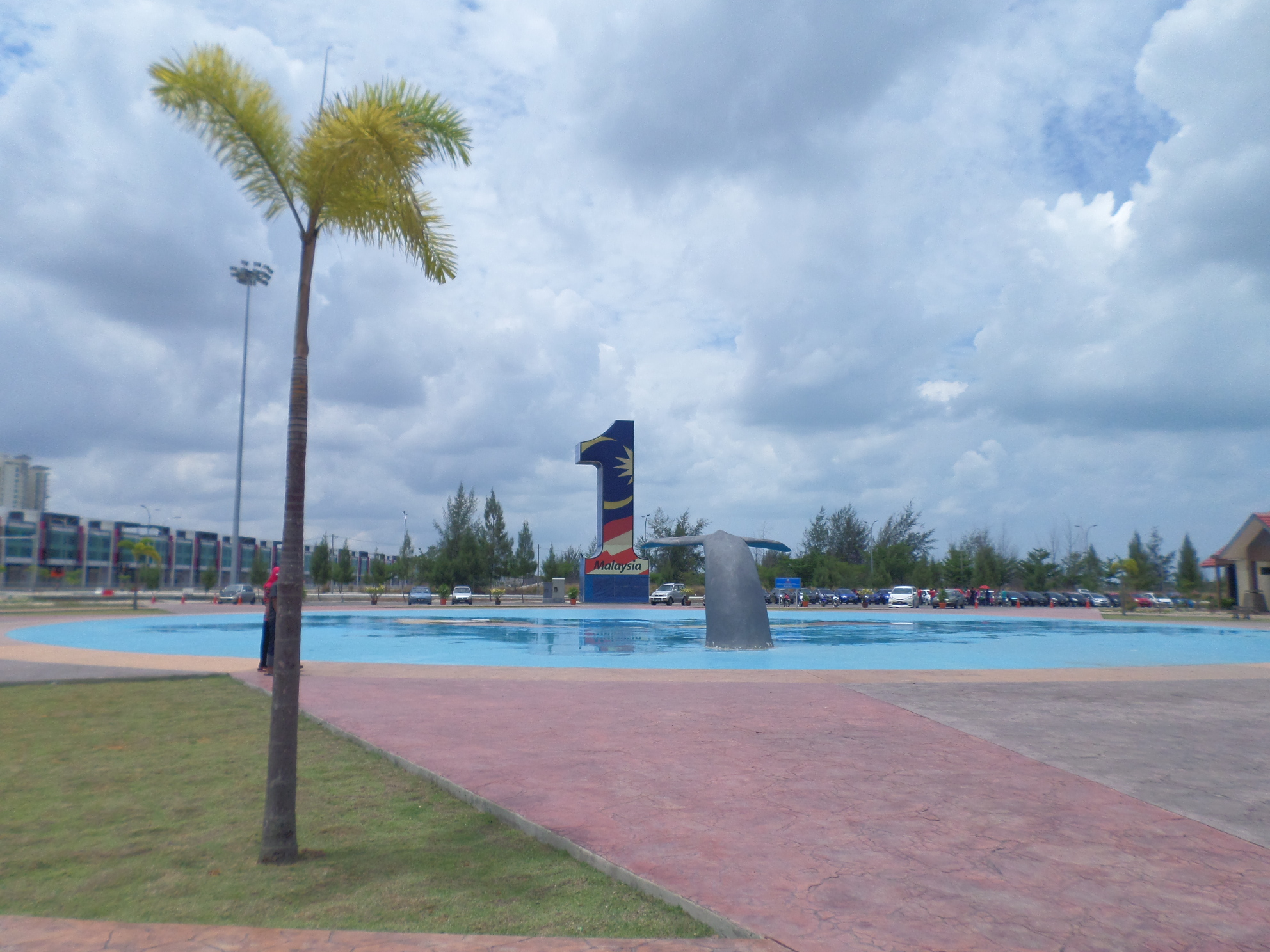
1Malaysia Square in Malacca.

1Malaysia is a concept introduced by Prime Minister Najib Razak to promote national unity. According to Razak, the concept is based on eight values: high performance, culture, accuracy, knowledge, innovation, integrity, strong will, loyalty, and wisdom.

=== Logo and slogan ===
An official logo and slogan have been introduced alongside the launch of the 1Malaysia concept. The logo features the number '1', incorporating the national Jalur Gemilang flag and the word "Malaysia". According to the Deputy Minister in the Prime Minister's Department, the government spent RM38 million (approximately US$8 million) to promote the concept in 2010.

==== Slogan ====
Year	Theme
2009	Rakyat Didahulukan, Pencapaian Diutamakan (People First, Performance Now)
2010	Menjana Transformasi (Generating Transformation)
2011	Transformasi Berjaya, Rakyat Sejahtera (Transformation Successful, People Prosperous)
2012	Janji Ditepati (Promises Fulfilled)
2013	Rakyat Didahulukan (People Come First)
2015	Sehati Sejiwa (One Heart, One Soul)

=== Introduction of KPIs ===
The 1Malaysia initiative introduced the use of Key Performance Indicators (KPIs) and National Key Result Areas (NKRAs) to improve government efficiency. KPIs were used to evaluate ministries and government agencies, with performance reviews conducted every six months. Each ministry was required to establish specific KPIs, focusing on policy outcomes rather than traditional input-based assessments.

The NKRAs focused on six policy areas: crime prevention, reducing government corruption, increasing access to quality education, improving the standard of living for low-income groups, upgrading rural infrastructure, and enhancing public transportation.

To support the implementation of the KPI system, a new cabinet position was created. Idris Jala, the former CEO of Malaysia Airlines, was appointed Minister Without a Portfolio and CEO of the Performance Management and Delivery Unit (PEMANDU). He worked alongside Koh Tsu Koon, the minister in charge of National Unity and Performance Management, to train over 500 government officers in the KPI system.

== Initiatives of 1Malaysia ==
=== Government Transformation Programme ===
The Government Transformation Programme (GTP) was created to address seven key areas concerning the people of the country. The programme was unveiled on 28 January 2010 to support the 1Malaysia concept and motto "People First, Performance Now" and is expected to contribute in making the country a developed and high-income nation as per its Vision 2020.

=== 1Malaysia F1 ===
Founded as Lotus Racing, the team was operated by 1Malaysia Racing Team Sdn. Bhd., a privately funded project jointly owned by Tune Group and Naza Group, in partnership with the Malaysian Government and a consortium of Malaysian entrepreneurs. Proton, the Malaysian car company which owns Lotus Cars, gave permission for the team to use the Lotus brand in Formula One. The Malaysian Government emphasised that the government itself is not going to invest in the team and that the Malaysian government's investment is only through Proton. Dubbed as 1Malaysia F1 team, the project is part of the 1Malaysia initiative, intended to promote unity amongst Malaysians.

=== 1Malaysia clinics ===
In the 2010 budget, the Malaysian government allocated funding to establish 50 medical clinics under the 1Malaysia initiative. These clinics provided basic medical services for conditions such as fever, coughs, colds, wounds, cuts, diabetes, and hypertension. Malaysian citizens were charged RM1 (approximately US$0.22) for treatment and medication, while non-citizens were charged RM15. These clinics were later renamed Klinik Komuniti (lit. 'Community Clinics').

=== 1Malaysia People's Housing Programme ===
The 1Malaysia Housing Programme or Perumahan Rakyat 1Malaysia (PR1MA) is a housing development programme in Malaysia. Launched on 4 July 2011 by former Prime Minister Najib Razak, the project is currently managed by the government-owned company Perbadanan PR1MA Malaysia under the Ministry of Local Government Development. PR1MA mission is to plan, develop and provide affordable and high-quality homes inspired by modern living concepts for middle-income Malaysians.

=== 1Malaysia Wireless Village ===
As part of the 1Malaysia campaign, free Wi-Fi services were introduced in rural areas under the Kampung Tanpa Wayar (lit. 'Wireless Villages') initiative. The services were later rebranded as WiFi Komuniti (lit. 'Community WiFi').

=== 1Malaysia email ===
The 1Malaysia email project was introduced as part of the Malaysian government's social networking initiative to provide free email accounts for official communication between the public and the government. A contract worth RM50 million (approximately US$11 million) was awarded to Tricubes Bhd. to manage and implement the project. Announced in April 2011 under the Economic Transformation Program (ETP), the initiative was projected by then-Prime minister Najib Razak to generate a gross national income (GNI) impact of RM39 million (approximately US$14.4 million) by 2015. However, there were conflicting statements regarding its funding. While some government officials and Tricubes Bhd. provided differing accounts on whether the project was privately funded or a government initiative, the Performance Management and Delivery Unit (PEMANDU) stated that "not a single cent of public money is or will be spent" on the project.

=== 1Malaysia Development Berhad ===
1Malaysia Development Berhad (1MDB) is a government-owned investment fund launched in 2009, originally established as the Terengganu Investment Authority (TIA) before being renamed. The fund later became involved in controversies related to financial mismanagement and corruption allegations, leading to multiple investigations, arrests, and legal proceedings, including those involving former Prime Minister Najib Razak.

=== Kedai Rakyat 1Malaysia ===
Kedai Rakyat 1Malaysia (KR1M) was a convenience store chain launched in 2011, with its first outlet located at the Kelana Jaya Line Light Rail Transit (LRT) station in Kuala Lumpur. The initiative aimed to provide affordable groceries to low-income groups. However, KR1M faced criticism for selling goods at prices higher than market value and for the poor quality of some products. By 2017, the stores ceased operations due to financial and operational challenges.

=== 1Malaysia Foundation ===
The 1Malaysia Foundation (Yayasan 1Malaysia, Y1M) was established in 2009 to promote and support the 1Malaysia concept. Y1M aims to coordinate and support government and private-sector initiatives related to 1Malaysia agenda. According to Dr. Chandra Muzaffar, the chairman of the Y1M Board of Trustees, the foundation seeks to "expand and strengthen the commitment from all Malaysians towards national unity through various activities to increase public awareness and community development.

=== 1Malaysia for Youth ===
1Malaysia for Youth (1M4U) was created to encourage the volunteerism among Malaysian youth. 1M4U also launched iM4U fm radio station on 8 January 2014 and began broadcasting in 15 September via its frequency 107.9 FM until it ceased broadcasting on 29 June 2018. iM4U fm was rebranded to Rakita in January 2019.

=== 1Malaysia Youth Fund ===
The 1Malaysia Youth Fund was established to provide financial support for young people to undertake creative projects aimed at fostering national unity. A total of RM20 million (US$4.4 million) was allocated to the fund under Malaysia's 2010 budget. The initiative was proposed by the Barisan Nasional Youth Lab.

=== Negaraku 1Malaysia ===
In conjunction with the 60th National Day celebration in 2017, the 'Negaraku' initiative was launched. It was used alongside the 1Malaysia concept, rebranded as the "Negaraku 1Malaysia" concept and logo. The term 'Negaraku' was also incorporated into greetings by coalition politicians during official events, including the National Day parade. Following the victory of Pakatan Harapan in the 2018 Malaysian general election, both the "Negaraku" initiative and the 1Malaysia concept were discontinued.

== Controversies ==
=== Interpretation ===
A year after the introduction of the 1Malaysia concept, former Prime Minister Mahathir Mohamad, who also served as Najib Razak’s mentor, reportedly stated that he "still doesn't understand" the concept. In July 2010, an opinion poll highlighted public scepticism about the initiative. According to The Malaysian Insider, the survey revealed that the non-Malay respondents were "almost split" on the Najib administration's national unity agenda. The poll found that 46% of respondents believed the 1Malaysia concept was a political strategy to win non-Malay votes, while only 39% felt it was a sincere effort to promote unity among all races in Malaysia.

=== Criticism of poor public services ===
Various 1Malaysia initiatives have faced criticism over the years. The 1Malaysia clinics were particularly criticised for their lack of equipment, poor-quality medications, unqualified staff, and reports of unprofessional behaviour by nursing personnel towards patients. Similarly the 1Malaysia Wireless Village was heavily criticised by the rural community for its frequent malfunctions and slow Wi-Fi services, with many labelling the project a "failure."

The 1Malaysia email initiative also drew public backlash, especially from the opposition Pakatan Rakyat, due to concerns about the substantial spending involved and Tricubes financial difficulties. In response to public outcry, Prime Minister Najib Razak clarified that it was a private-sector initiative and that the acceptance of email accounts was voluntary. Protests were organised on Facebook, and the initiative was parodied on a website.

1Malaysia Development Berhad company faced multiple controversies, including the purchase of overpriced land from Tadmax Resources, a company linked to the Port Klang Free Zone scandal, and its involvement in the 1Malaysia Development Berhad scandal.

KR1M also faced significant criticism. Complaints were raised about the pricing of groceries, with many customers noting that items were more expensive than those sold by other supermarkets. In addition, there were allegations of poor product quality, particularly regarding children’s milk formula, fresh milk, condensed milk, sweetened condensed creamer, oyster sauce, fruit jam, and other products. In response, KR1M conducted periodic laboratory tests on their products to address these concerns.

=== Criticism of undermining Malay rights ===
Najib's efforts to liberalise government policies and create a more inclusive approach to all races with 1Malaysia led the Malay rights group Perkasa to seek further clarification on the policy. They feared that 1Malaysia might undermine the rights of the Malays or Bumiputera in favour of minorities in Malaysia.

=== Anwar Ibrahim's suspension from parliament ===
On 22 April 2010, Anwar Ibrahim, the leader of Malaysia's opposition, was condemned by the Parliament of Malaysia for remarks he made during a press conference in the parliament on 30 March 2010. Anwar claimed to have documents linking One Israel and the public relations firm APCO Worldwide to the 1Malaysia initiative, but he refused to provide access to these documents when challenged.

As it is against Malaysia's foreign policy to have dealings with Israel, the appointment of APCO garnered a significant criticism from the majority Muslim population, who demanded that Prime Minister Najib Razak terminate the contract with the company. Both the Malaysian government and APCO strongly denied Anwar's allegations. The censure motion passed by the House of Representatives referred Anwar's case to the Rights and Privileges Committee, which was tasked with recommending punishment for approval by the full chamber. Potential punishments included expulsion from Parliament. In response, Anwar produced two documents to support his claims and counter the government's denials.

Anwar was subsequently suspended from Parliament by the Parliamentary Rights and Privileges Committee, based solely on a letter from APCO, without the opportunity to defend himself against the allegations. This decision led to a walkout by opposition MPs. On 16 December 2010, Anwar and three opposition MPs—Karpal Singh, Azmin Ali, and Sivarasa Rasiah—were suspended from Parliament. Anwar has since blamed APCO Worldwide for the suspension of himself and the other opposition parliamentarians.

=== 1MDB scandal and downfall ===
Since the revelation of the 1MDB scandal in 2015, the slogan 1Malaysia adopted a negative connotation in relation to Najibs Razak's administration. The scandal involved allegations of massive embezzlement and corruption, with billions of dollars missing from a state investment fund. Investigations into the scandal were launched in multiple countries, including the United States, Switzerland, and Singapore. The 1MDB scandal had a profound impact on Malaysia's political and economic landscape, eroding public trust in the government and becoming a focal point for political opposition.

Following the defeat of the Barisan Nasional in the 2018 Malaysian general election, the 1Malaysia slogan and the "Salam 1Malaysia" greeting were gradually phased out by the new administration. They were eventually replaced by Sayangi Malaysiaku, a slogan introduced by Mahathir Mohamad, who succeeded Najib after winning the 2018 election.

== See also ==
- Bangsa Malaysia
- Malaysian Malaysia
- 1Malaysia Development Berhad scandal
