= Submarine Museum =

Museum in Melaka Tengah, Malacca, Malaysia

- Muzium Kapal Selam
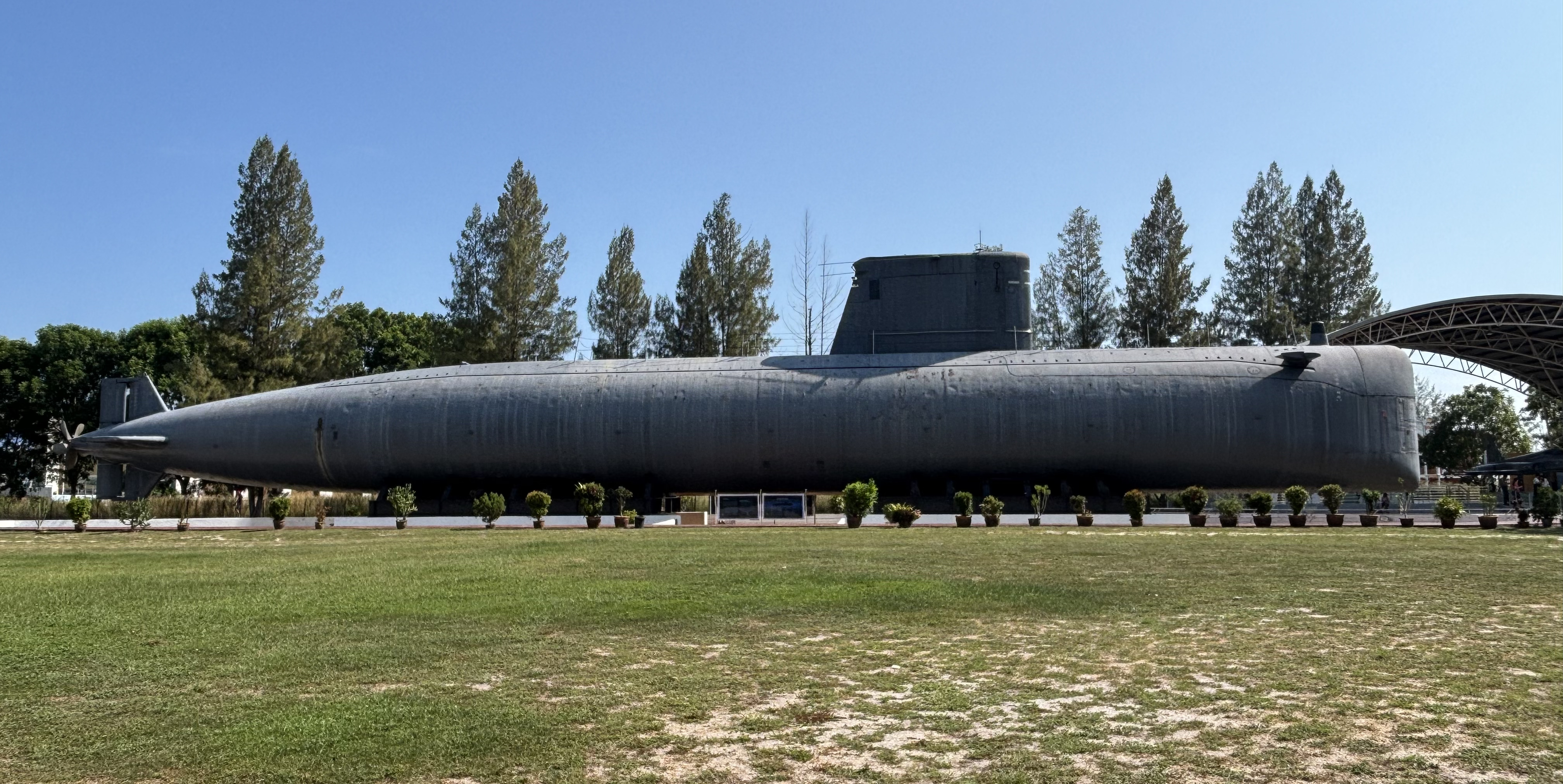
- Established: 22 November 2011
- Location: Klebang, Malacca, Malaysia
- Coordinates: 2°12′50.4″N 102°11′54.5″E
- Type: museum

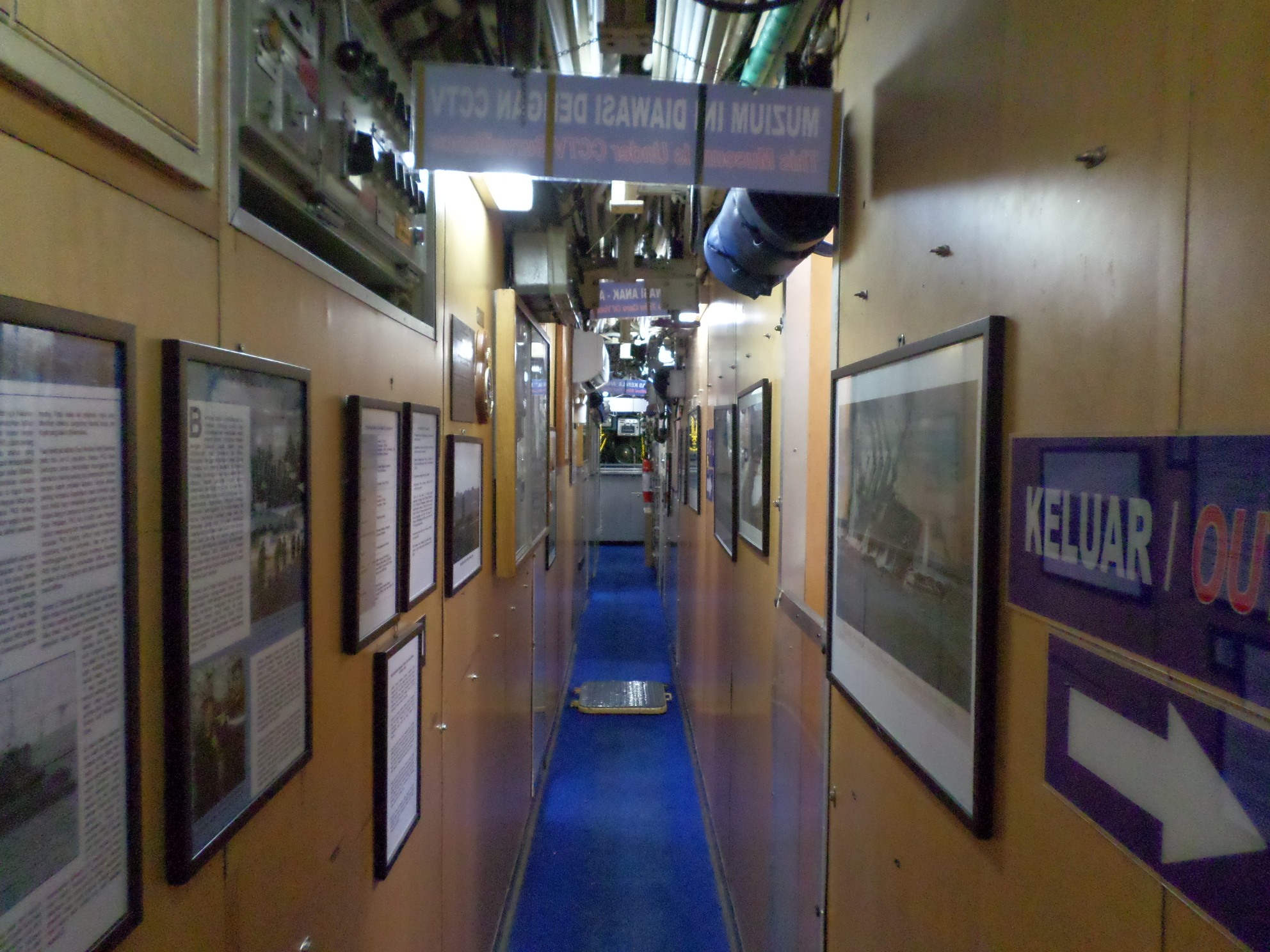
Submarine interior

Submarine Museum (Malay: Muzium Kapal Selam) is a museum made out of a decommissioned submarine situated in Klebang, Malacca, Malaysia. The decommissioned submarine is a France-made Agosta class 70 submarine named Quessant (S623), which was used to train the first Royal Malaysian Navy crews from 2005 to 2009. It measures 67.5 meters in length, 11.7 in height and 6.5 meters in width, with a displacement of 1,300 tonnes, and was last used by the Royal Malaysian Navy and French Navy in July 2009, when journey through the Atlantic Ocean was made. On 23 September 2011, Malaysian Ambassador to France Tan Sri Abdul Aziz Zainal signed an agreement for the ownership of the unused submarine with French Defence Minister.

The decommissioned submarine was transported by sea by Felda Transport Services Sdn. Bhd. and Jumbo Shipping. It departed from French Naval Base in Brest, France on 9 October 2011. It reached Malaysia on 13 November 2011, and arrived in Klebang on 17 November 2011. The museum was opened to the public on 22 November 2011 for 10 days as a promotional preview. A total of 25,000 visitors flocked into the museum, including the Governor of Malacca Mohd Khalil Yaakob.

It was then closed for refurbishment and painting work and it was reopened again on 17 December 2011. It was officiated on 4 March 2012 by Malacca Chief Minister Mohd Ali Rustam and Defence Minister Ahmad Zahid Hamidi when the submarine was handed over from the Ministry of Defence to Malacca State Government. In March 2015, it was decided that the museum would be upgraded by adding prayer room and shops over the next two years. The overall cost of the museum is MYR12.6 million, which also includes the cost for transportation, harbor, road, renovation, foundation work and visitor facilities.

== See also ==
- List of museums in Malaysia
- List of submarine museums
- List of tourist attractions in Malacca
