= Shared Prosperity Vision 2030 =

Shared Prosperity Vision 2030 (Malay: Wawasan Kemakmuran Bersama 2030), (abbreviated SPV 2030 or WKB 2030) was a government blueprint released in 2020 by the Government of Malaysia for the period of 2021 to 2030 to increase the incomes of all ethnic groups, particularly the Bumiputera comprising the B40 (lower income group), the hardcore poor, the economically poor, those in economic transition, Orang Asli, Sabah and Sarawak bumiputeras, disabled people, youths, women, children and senior citizens.

== Background ==
The plan for the shared prosperity vision had been addressed and officially launched on 5 October 2019 by Prime Minister Mahathir Mohamad following the unsolved large economic gap among the Bumiputera with the failure of fair development and distribution towards the country's demographics due to widespread corruption practices and abuse of power among Bumiputera politicians and state servants which subsequently hindered many past visions for the country's development. The blueprint also created to upskill Bumiputera Malaysians in various sectors of the country with the country's Prime Minister ensuring that any development taken under the blueprint in both Sabah and Sarawak will not violate native customary rights (NCR) land in the respective territories.

== Reception ==
According to the executive director of Socio-Economic Research Centre Lee Heng Guie, Malaysia is positioned at a critical juncture as the country's aspiration of becoming a developed high-income country by 2023 is being challenged by many structural impediments and weaknesses domestically as well as increasing complexity in the external environment, with decisive and bold reforms needed in ensuring sustainable and inclusive economic growth in the longer term - where he added that the success can be achieved only if the plan is executed efficiently.

Nevertheless, the blueprint which emphasises equal opportunities for all Malaysians (including non-Bumiputeras) has sparked concern among some Bumiputeras as to whether their interests and rights would still be protected, while some other quarters questioning PH's earlier promise of equal rights when affirmative action is still implemented. This was subsequently responded by the Economic Affairs Deputy Minister Senator Dr Mohd Radzi Md Jidin who explained that the new policy does not sideline the Bumiputera agenda at all but emphasises the outcome for Bumiputeras although the Senator still declined the policy is solely a race-based policy where he still claimed it is based on needs and narrowing the economic gap in the context of income irrespective of race. Home Minister Muhyiddin Yassin also assured that under the blueprint, the government will takes a more inclusive approach in addressing economic disparity unlike previous race-based economic policies. Meanwhile, former Prime Minister Najib Razak criticise the PH's government over the alleged miscalculation for the target of Malaysia's gross domestic product (GDP) to reach RM3.4 trillion by 2030 under the vision although it was debunked by Economic Affairs Minister Mohamed Azmin Ali who said it was Najib "confusion".

Rural Development Minister of Sabah, Ewon Benedick said the federal government's blueprint should be translated into return of revenue and autonomy to Sabah as enshrined in the 1963 Malaysian Agreement and Federal Constitution especially the return of two-fifths or 40% net revenue received by the federal government from Sabah as provided in Article 112C and the 10th Schedule of the Federal Constitution. He added that the Prime Minister, Deputy Prime Minister, Cabinet and Dewan Rakyat members having taken their oath and declared to uphold, safeguard and defend the constitution in discharging their duties therefore it is not only their moral responsibility, but the duty of the entire federal cabinet to carry out the oath and pledge as contained in the constitution by returning what is owed to the state.

== See also ==
- Vision 2020
- National Transformation 2050
