= Klebang Beach =

Beach in Klebang, Malacca, Malaysia

Klebang Beach Pantai Klebang
- beach
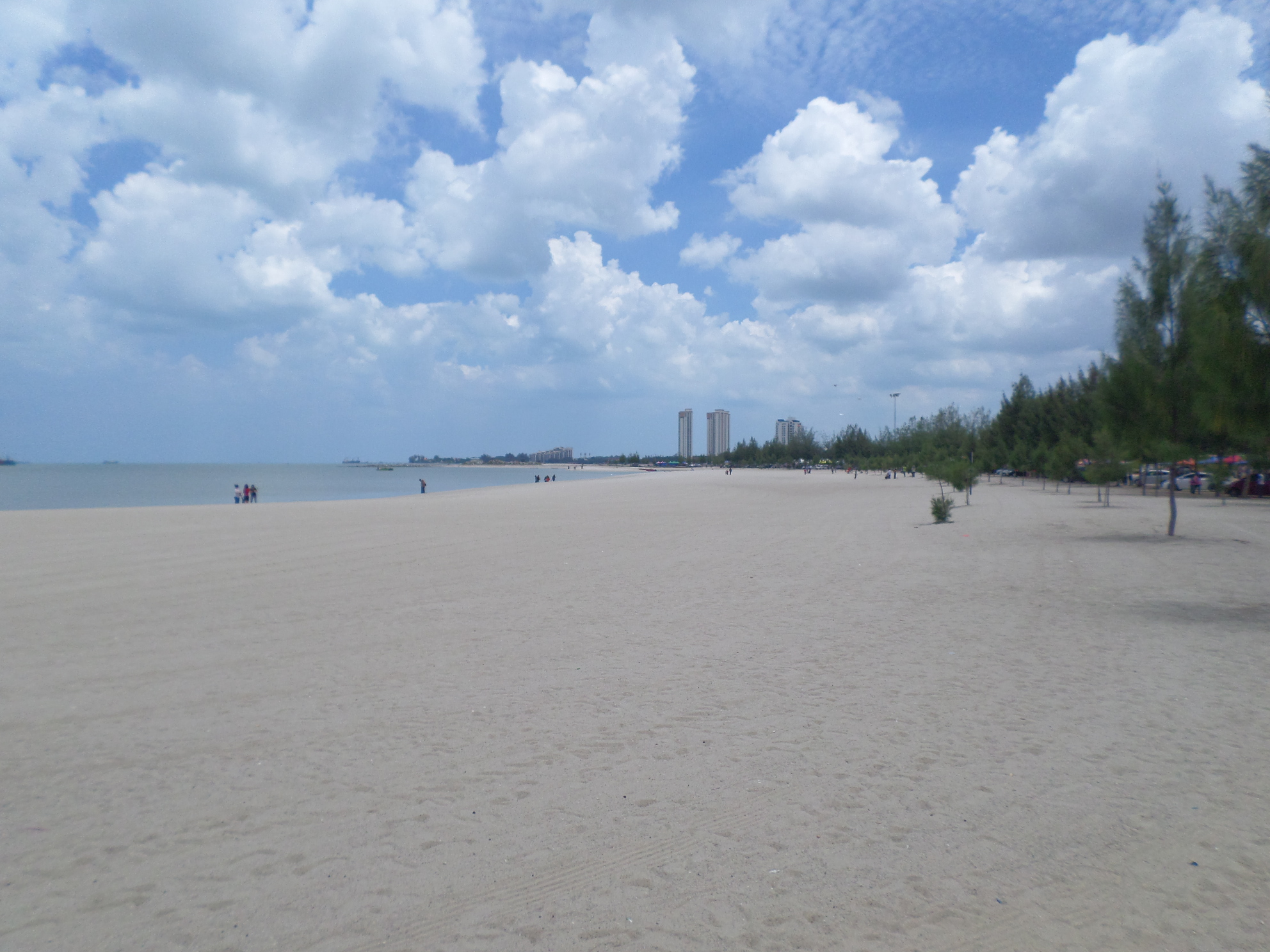

- Coordinates: 2°12′59.1″N 102°11′32.0″E
- Location: Klebang, Melaka Tengah District, Malacca, Malaysia

Klebang Beach (Malay: Pantai Klebang) is a beach in the town of Klebang, in the Malaysian state of Malacca. It faces directly to the Strait of Malacca at the end of Klebang Peninsula and is located next to the 1Malaysia Square.

== See also ==
- Geography of Malaysia
- List of tourist attractions in Malacca
