= Upeh Island =

Island in Malacca, Malaysia

Native name: Pulau Upeh
- Interactive map of Upeh Island

Geography
- Location: Strait of Malacca
- Coordinates: 2°11′31.6″N 102°12′9.3″E
- Area: 0.038 km^{2} (0.015 sq mi)

Administration
- Malaysia
- State: Malacca
- District: Melaka Tengah
- Mukim: City centre

Upeh Island (Malay: Pulau Upeh) is an islet located 600 metres off the coast of the town of Klebang in the Malaysian state of Malacca (2 kilometres before land reclamation). It used to be one of the places in the state with the highest number of hawksbill turtle landings and nesting sites. But a series of ongoing land reclamation projects near the island cause rapid coastal erosion, degradation of its beach and a dwindling number of turtle landings at the islet for nesting and egg laying. A now-abandoned resort can be seen within the islet's dense forest.

== See also ==
- List of islands of Malaysia
