= Science and technology in Malaysia =

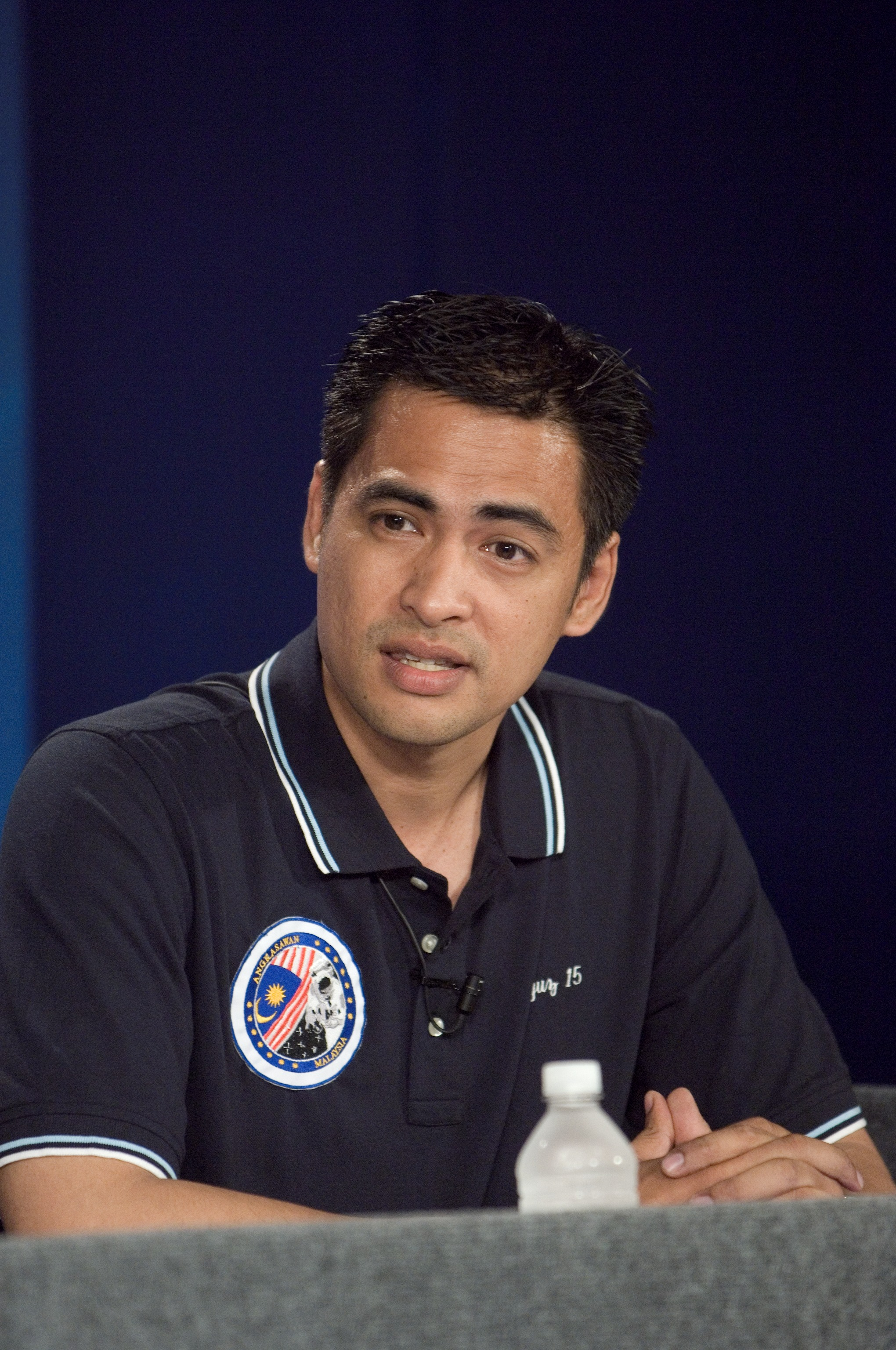
Sheikh Muszaphar Shukor, the first Malaysian in space

Science policy in Malaysia is regulated by the Ministry of Science, Technology, and Innovation. The ministry focuses on five areas: biotechnology, ICT policy, industry, sea to space and core science and technology. Other ministries, such as the Ministry of Agriculture and the Ministry of Health also have science departments. Training in scientific areas was promoted during the 1970s and 1980s. From 1987 to 1997 research and development used 0.24% of GNP, and in 2023 high-tech exports made up 59% of Malaysia's manufactured exports.

Malaysia is one of the world's largest exporters of semiconductor devices, electrical goods, information and communication technology products. Innovation in Malaysia is dominated by large foreign multinational companies.

Malaysia was ranked 34th in the Global Innovation Index in 2026, and 32nd in the Global Competitiveness Report in 2022.

== History ==
In an effort to create a self-reliant defense capability and support national development, Malaysia privatised some of its military facilities in the 1970s. This has created a defence industry, which was brought under the Malaysia Defence Industry Council in 1999. The government continues to promote and market this sector and its competitiveness.

The first satellite operated by Malaysia was during 1996 when a private company, MEASAT Satellite Systems Sdn. Bhd (formerly known as Binariang Satellite Systems Sdn. Bhd) bought 2 communications satellites from Boeing Satellite Systems named them MEASAT-1 and MEASAT-2. MEASAT-3 and MEASAT-3A was launched on 2006 and 2009 respectively. Malaysia successfully designed and built its first remote sensing satellite named TiungSAT-1 through collaboration between Astronautic Technology Sdn Bhd in Malaysia and Surrey Satellite Technology Ltd. in the United Kingdom. The satellite was launched into low Earth orbit on 26 September 2000 at Baikonur Cosmodrome, Kazakhstan. Malaysia's second remote sensing satellite, RazakSAT was launched on 14 July 2009 and RazakSAT-2 was planned to be launched in 2015.

In 2002 the Malaysian National Space Agency (Angkasa) was formed to deal with all of Malaysia's activities in space, and to promote space education and space experiments. It is focused on developing the "RazakSAT" satellite, which is a remote sensing satellite with charge-coupled device cameras. In early 2006, Sheikh Muszaphar Shukor and three other finalists were selected for the Angkasawan spaceflight programme. This programme came about when Russia agreed to transport one Malaysian to the International Space Station as part of a multibillion-dollar purchase of 18 Russian Sukhoi Su-30MKM fighter jets by the Royal Malaysian Air Force.

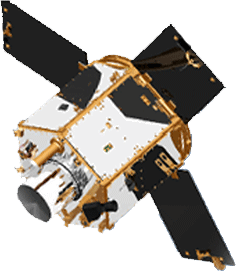
Malaysian remote sensing satellite, RazakSAT

In an effort to create a self-reliant defensive ability and support national development Malaysia privatised some of its military facilities in the 1970s. This has created a defence industry, which in 1999 was brought under the Malaysia Defence Industry Council. The government continues to try and promote this sector and its competitiveness, actively marketing the defence industry. One way it does this is through the Langkawi International Maritime and Aerospace Exhibition, one of the largest defence and civil showcases in the Asia Pacific, regularly attended by over 500 companies. The Malaysian Armed Forces relies heavily on local military technology and high-tech weapons systems designed and manufactured by foreign countries.

The Malaysian Antarctic Research Programmer began in 1997 following an invitation from New Zealand to use Scott Base and Malaysian cabinet approval. A task force created by the Academy of Sciences Malaysia sent their first expedition in 1999. On 5 August 2002 the University of Malaya established the National Antarctic Research Centre. The Antarctic Research Programmer's area of interest was extended to the arctic in 2006. On 31 October 2011 Malaysia became a party to the Antarctic Treaty.

In July 2011, a group of Malaysian scientists founded the Scientific Malaysian network, a non-profit initiative to connect Malaysian scientists across the globe.

== Scientific Malaysian network ==
Scientific Malaysian network was formed by the local and overseas Malaysian scientists. Most Malaysian scientists are employed in public universities or governmental research institutions and partially in the private universities and private R&D departments with commercialisation pressure. A significant number of Malaysian scientists have established their research career overseas, which some of them stay in the country completed their PhD. Local and oversea Malaysian scientists are connected through various research activities via conferences, forums, publications and joint research funding applications. Connecting the local and oversea Malaysian scientists are important to unite the country scientific forces to contribute the country development.

== Malaysian scientists abroad ==
Malaysian scientist abroad or overseas Malaysian scientist are the common terms for Malaysian scientists residing abroad who are active in the research and development in the scientific community. A number of the Malaysian scientists continue their research career after finishing their Ph.D. overseas, particularly in the US, UK, European Union, China, Ireland, Australia, New Zealand, Canada, Singapore, and Hong Kong. Malaysian scientists abroad have strong connection with home country and inherit the linguistic strength in the multicultural community with Malays, Chinese and India.

== Science policies in Malaysia ==
The Malaysian government establishes science policies to push forward the science and technology development in the country under the Ministry of Science, Technology and Innovation. The government helps actively connect the local and overseas scientists to push forward the Transformasi Nasional 2050 (TN50), but this initiative of national development was abandoned in 2018 with some aspirations maintained by the Pakatan Harapan (PH)'s Malaysia Baharu government after the 2018 Malaysian general election.
