= Kuriding =

Indonesian bamboo ring flute

Woodwind instrument
- Inventor(s): Banjarese
- Developed: Indonesia

Kuriding also known as the gurinding, uriding, turiding or kubing is a traditional musical instrument of the Banjar people originating from South Kalimantan, Indonesia. Although small in size, this instrument can produce a loud and melodious sound. Kurinding measures about 15 centimeters long and 1.5 centimeters wide. This musical instrument consists of two parts, namely the inside and the outside. The inside is the part that is attached to the mouth when it is sounded. While the outside is facing the outside.

Kurinding can be made from palm fronds, bamboo, or wood. Rectangular shape. Both ends are rounded, in addition to beautifying, the round shape at the end of the curd also serves as a safety so as not to hurt the mouth when played. On the Kurinding musical instrument there is a vibrating instrument, namely a rope made of palm fibers or tree wood strings. The vibrating tool is divided into two parts, namely the right side and the left side. At the right and left ends there are holes for putting a rope connected to a vibrating device.

This musical instrument is played by placing it on the lips while pulling the handle of the vibrating rope that will produce a sound. With a certain rhythm, the resulting sound will sound very beautiful and melodious.

== See also ==
- Suling
- Music of Indonesia
