= Jombola =

Malaysian racket sport

Jombola (currently known as DragonShot) is a racket sport combining several features of other racket sports, similar to pickleball in United States and padel in Europe. It was independently developed by Sukdev Singh from Malaysia in 2006.

== History ==
Sukdev Singh, Director of Sri Dasmesh International School, Kuala Lumpur, Malaysia, conceived the game using a wooden racquet, balls made of foam, and a badminton court. The net height differs from Badminton. It is 4 ft 4in above the court surface. The game uses a 11 and 15 points scoring system for Singles and doubles respectively. The net height is 4.4 feet (1.32 metres).

As the game grew in popularity in the country, Jombola Association Malaysia (JAM) was founded in 2014 to promote and manage the development of Jombola sport. The sport was introduced to Malaysia's Ministry of Education in 2014. Malaysian Ministry of Education included this sport under 1 Student 1 Sport programme in 2017 for secondary schools. First Jombola open tournament was completed in November 2017. On August 2025, the name Jombola was changed to DragonShot.

Jombola was introduced to east Malaysian states of Sabah in 2020 and Sarawak in 2022.

Sukdev also planned to make Jombola an Olympics demonstration sport between 2028 and 2032.

Today, DragonShot Jombola is quickly making its way into Indonesia, Philippines, India, Spain, Italy and Canada.

== Order of play ==
A "serve" is defined as the player's action of starting a ball when the game begins or the game is resumed after either player obtains a point. Each serve should start with the server and opponent in diagonally opposite courts. The ball must be served diagonally and landed within the opposite rectangle in which the opponent is standing. Landing in the "short" or "long" service lines is a "fault" while landing in the other court is a "wrong court" In these cases, the server will lose points to his opponent. The opponent is obliged to return the ball to the server if the ball passes over the net and in his view, the ball will be landed in the appropriate rectangle.

== See also ==
- Pickleball
- Padel
