= Klebang =

Town in Malacca, Malaysia

Klebang Klebang
- Suburb of Malacca City
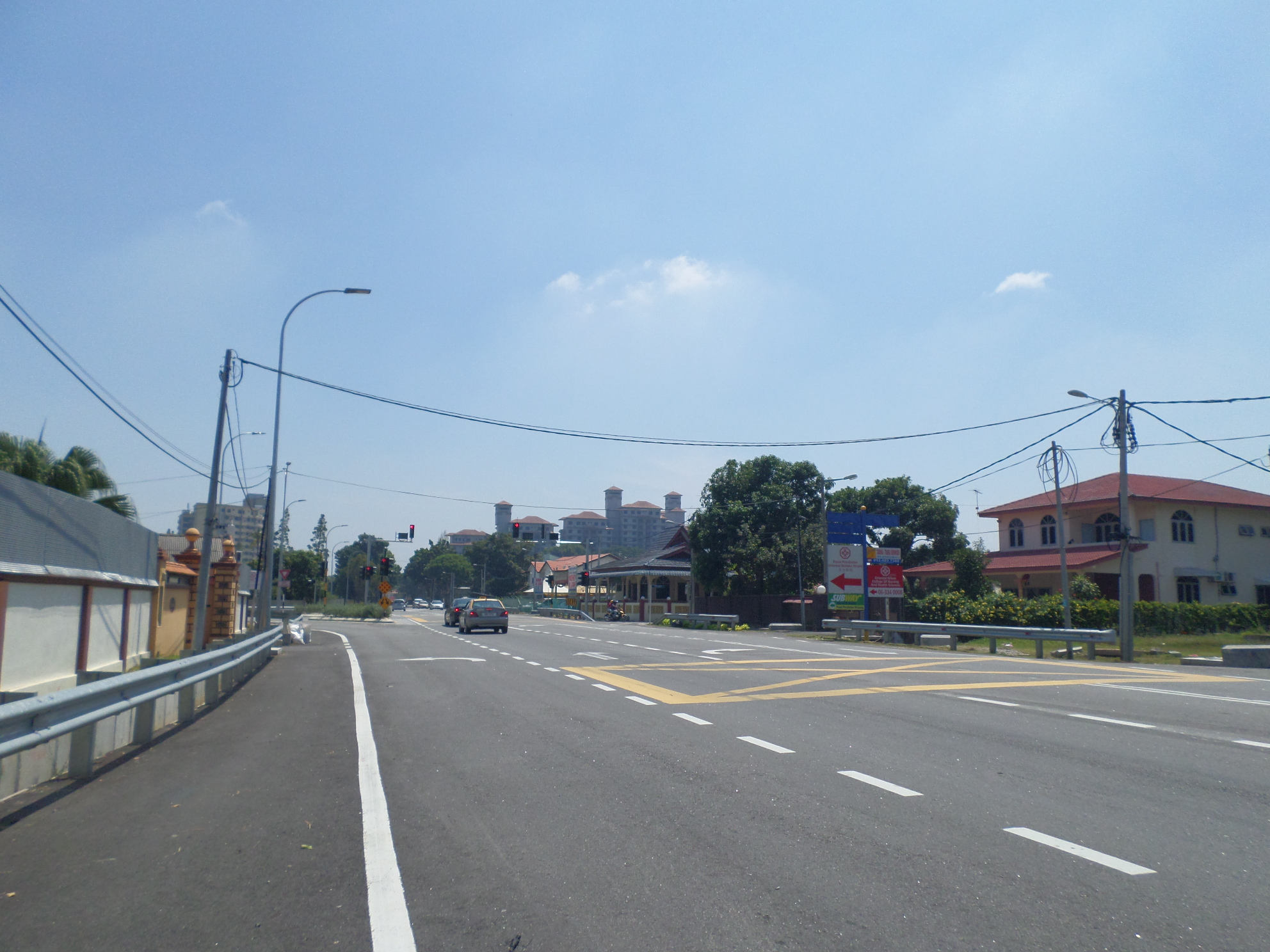

- Location within Malacca
- Coordinates: 2°13′12″N 102°12′0″E
- Country: Malaysia
- State: Malacca
- District: Melaka Tengah

Area
  - Total: 1.721 km^{2} (0.664 sq mi)

Population (2020)
  - Total: 6,915
  - Density: 4,018/km^{2} (10,410/sq mi)
  - Summer (DST): Not observed

Klebang is a suburb of Malacca City and a mukim of Melaka Tengah District in the Malaysian state of Malacca. Located along the Strait of Malacca, the town is rapidly developing due to a series of ongoing land reclamation projects in and around the town since the late 1990s. However, these projects have negative impacts on the town's coastal environment and the livelihood of the fishermen.

== Tourist attractions ==
- 1Malaysia Square – A town square near Klebang Beach and Submarine Museum, which was officiated by sixth Prime Minister of Malaysia Najib Razak in February 2012.
- Klebang Beach – A beach facing directly to the Strait of Malacca at the end of Klebang Peninsula.
- Submarine Museum – A museum made out of a decommissioned submarine.
- Upeh Island – An islet located near the town famous as a site for hawksbill turtles landing to lay their eggs.

== See also ==
- Geography of Malaysia
