= Transformasi Nasional 2050 =

Malaysian national development initiative

Transformasi Nasional 2050 logo.

Transformasi Nasional 2050 (TN50, National Transformation 2050); was an initiative of national development that spans 30 years, from 2020 to 2050. It was launched by the 6th Prime Minister of Malaysia, Najib Razak. The initiative was planned to be driven by clear goals and targets for the span of 30 years, which were to be developed through a consultative process in the preparatory phase from 2017 to 2019.

Policy documents of TN50 were to be published in 2020. However following the changes of government in Malaysia in 2018, the new Youth and Sports Minister Syed Saddiq Syed Abdul Rahman announced the TN50 was officially dismantled with some aspirations maintained by the Pakatan Harapan (PH)'s Malaysia Baharu government after 2018 general election (GE14).

== History ==
The Ministry of Youth and Sports led by its minister Khairy Jamaluddin was put in-charge of the program and to start the process by leading the ‘TN50 Discussion’, involvement series and activities discourse.

The 2017–2019 preparation phase included other activities that related to the development of TN50 policy documents such as engagement with policy stakeholders, domain experts and leaders in specific areas.

=== Prime dialogue ===
The TN50 Prime Dialogue (Dialog Perdana TN50) was held in Dewan Tunku Canselor, Universiti Malaya on 19 January 2017. The event was attended by 500 youths voicing their aspirations for Malaysia for 2050.

In his speech, Najib said the approach was chosen because he wanted the TN50 to be the people's vision for the future of the nation.

== Criticism ==
The TN50 was allegedly initiated by Najib to undermined Mahathir Mohamad's Wawasan 2020 legacy that had fallen through due to the 2018 general election (GE14) results. Mahathir had claimed TN50 was due to Najib's BN government failure then to achieve the Wawasan 2020.

== See also ==
- Vision 2020
- Shared Prosperity Vision 2030
- 1Malaysia
