= Wawasan 2020 =

1991 Malaysian ideal

Wawasan 2020: logo and theme of the 1991 Merdeka Day

Wawasan 2020 or Vision 2020 is a Malaysian ideal introduced by the fourth and seventh Prime Minister of Malaysia, Mahathir Mohamad during the tabling of the Sixth Malaysia Plan in 1991. The vision calls for the nation to achieve a self-sufficient industrialised nation by the year 2020, encompasses all aspects of life, from economic prosperity, social well-being, educational worldclass, political stability, as well as psychological balance. To achieve Vision 2020, Mahathir lamented that the nation required an annual growth of 7% (in real terms) over the thirty-year period 1990–2020, so that the economy would be eightfold stronger than its 1990 GDP of RM115 billion. This would translate to a GDP of RM920 billion (in 1990 Ringgit terms) in 2020. Under Vision 2020 from 1991 to 2020, there are 3 sub 10 year development policy namely National development Policy 1991-2000 with OPP2, National Vision Policy 2001-2010 with OPP3 and New Economic Model 2011-2020 with National Transformation Programme (NTP).

Wawasan 2020 is also the title of an article by William Greider about globalisation in Malaysia.

== Strategic challenges ==
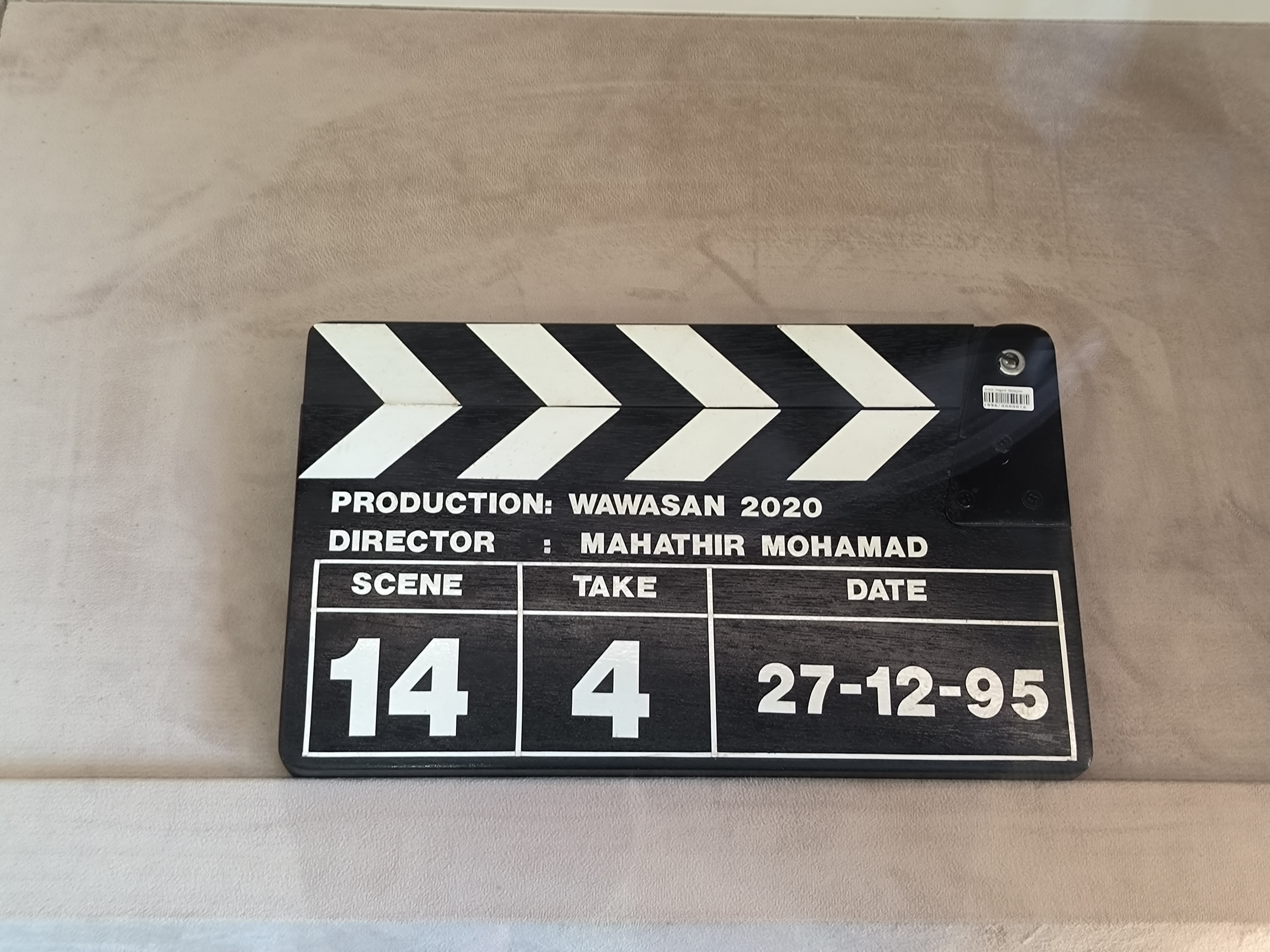

Mahathir outlined nine strategic challenges that Malaysia must overcome to achieve Vision 2020.

- Challenge 1: Establishing a united Malaysian nation made up of one Bangsa Malaysia (Malaysian Race).
- Challenge 2: Creating a psychologically liberated, secure and developed Malaysian society.
- Challenge 3: Fostering and developing a mature democratic society.
- Challenge 4: Establishing a fully moral and ethical society.
- Challenge 5: Establishing a matured liberal and tolerant society.
- Challenge 6: Establishing a scientific and progressive society.
- Challenge 7: Establishing a fully caring society.
- Challenge 8: Ensuring an economically just society, in which there is a fair and equitable distribution of the wealth of the nation.
- Challenge 9: Establishing a prosperous society with an economy that is fully competitive, dynamic, robust and resilient.

== Song ==
Wawasan 2020 is also a patriotic song on the same idea sung in Malay. The song was composed by Farish Daniel.

== Revisions to the vision ==
Due to economic slowdown during the 2008 financial crisis, Prime Minister of the then ruling Barisan Nasional government, Najib Razak in August 2009, stated that in order for Malaysia to achieve a developed nation status by 2020, the country has to grow at an annual rate of 8% over the next 10 years. He cited that a lower hypothetical growth of 6% per annum would delay Malaysia's vision to become a developed country by 10 years to 2030. Malaysia’s GDP growth rate averaged 7.2% per annum in the 1990s, and slowed to 5.4% per annum in the following decade. Najib also stated the need to redefine and recalibrate the vision in terms of how to achieve it, as well as its timeline. Besides, Malaysia has to undertake bold economic reforms, and Najib had tasked the National Economic Advisory Council (NEAC) to carry out a review of the vision. The NEAC is expected to publish its report by end 2009, with a second report on implementation 6 months after that.

Just before the downfall of BN federal government in the 2018 general election, Najib had launched the National Transformation 2050 or Transformasi Nasional 2050 (TN50) initiative, where by 2050 Malaysia will be "a nation of calibre, with a new mindset". The TN50 was allegedly initiated by Najib to undermine Mahathir's Wawasan 2020 legacy. The TN50 had somehow fallen through and was officially dismantled with some aspirations maintained by the Pakatan Harapan (PH)'s Malaysia Baharu government after the GE14.

== Outcome ==
In 2020, Mahathir Mohamad, the prime minister of Malaysia after Pakatan Harapan coalition came to power in 2018, officially announced the failure of the vision to achieve the status of developed nation. Although Wawasan 2020 did not fully achieve its objectives, Mahathir argued that other aspects of the vision had been achieved such that Malaysia has become more prosperous and with better infrastructure. Mahathir blamed his handpicked successors Abdullah Ahmad Badawi and Najib Razak for failing to properly implement his plan.

In terms of GDP growth, Malaysia last achieved yearly GDP growth of more than 7% in 2000. Since then, the Malaysian GDP only averages between 4% and 5% until 2018.

In terms of how well Malaysians are meeting the nine challenges listed by Mahathir in 1990, "The Full Frontal" website stated that challenges no 4 and no 7 are almost fully met while other challenges still have lots of room for improvement.

== See also ==
- Shared Prosperity Vision 2030
- First premiership of Mahathir Mohamad
