= Egg boiler =

Kitchen appliance

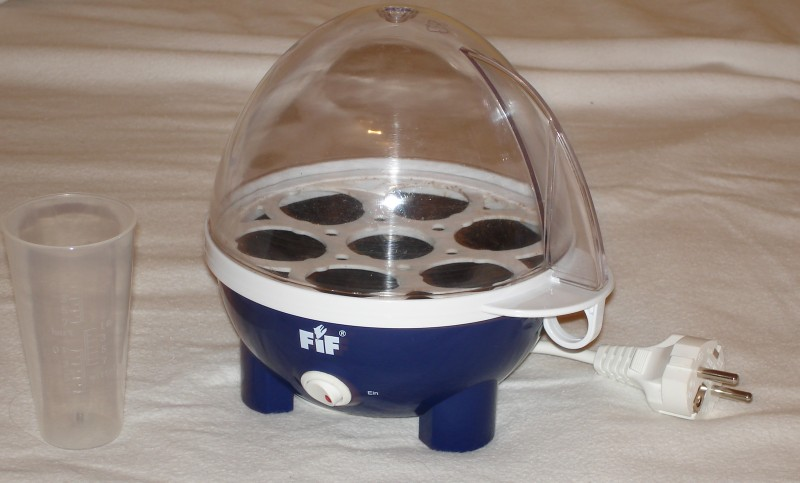
Electric egg boiler from 2007 for up to seven eggs (with associated water measuring cup)

An egg boiler, also known as an egg cooker or egg steamer, is a kitchen appliance used to cook eggs. While commonly called a boiler, the device actually cooks eggs using steam rather than immersion in boiling water.

== Design and operation ==
The dominant type among the modern cookers is the electric egg boiler, which consists of a heating plate to hold water, an egg holder (insert) to suspend the eggs, and a lid with a steam vent. The lid also serves as protection against splashing hot water. The device operates by evaporating a defined amount of water; the released enthalpy of condensation from the steam cooks the eggs.

Cookers typically control the cooking time (and thus the doneness of the egg) either directly via a timer, or by limiting the water quantity. In the latter case, the hardness of the egg is determined by the amount of water added. When the water has completely evaporated, the temperature of the heating plate rises above 100 °C, triggering a temperature switch that turns off the heating element or activates a buzzer. This method is energy efficient as it heats only the necessary amount of water and leaves no residual water in the device. If a built-in timer is used, the amount of water does not need to be measured precisely, provided there is enough to generate steam for the full cycle. This allows for eggs of different hardness levels to be removed at different times during the same cycle, though the timer must be adjusted based on egg size and starting temperature.

=== Types ===
Tools for cooking eggs assist in preparing them to a specific degree of hardness. Historically, these included simple egg timers and semi- or fully automatic cookers powered by spirit burners or gas stoves. Modern devices are typically electrically powered or designed for microwave use.

Egg cookers designed for microwaves also utilize steam cooking. These are considered highly energy-efficient due to the low water and energy requirements, making them suitable for preparing even a single egg quickly. Models exist for single eggs or multiple eggs (e.g., four at a time).

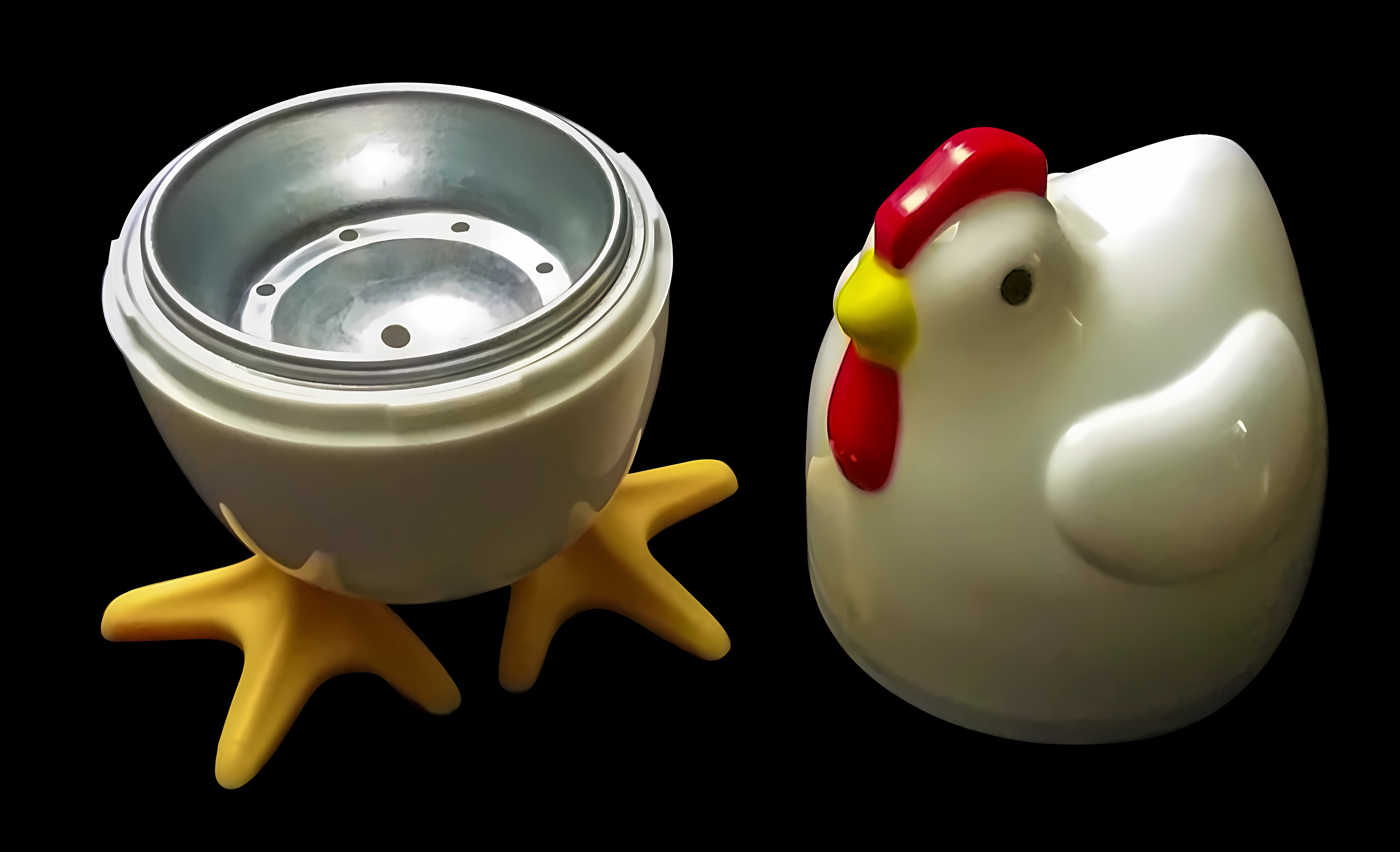
Microwave egg boiler (single egg model)

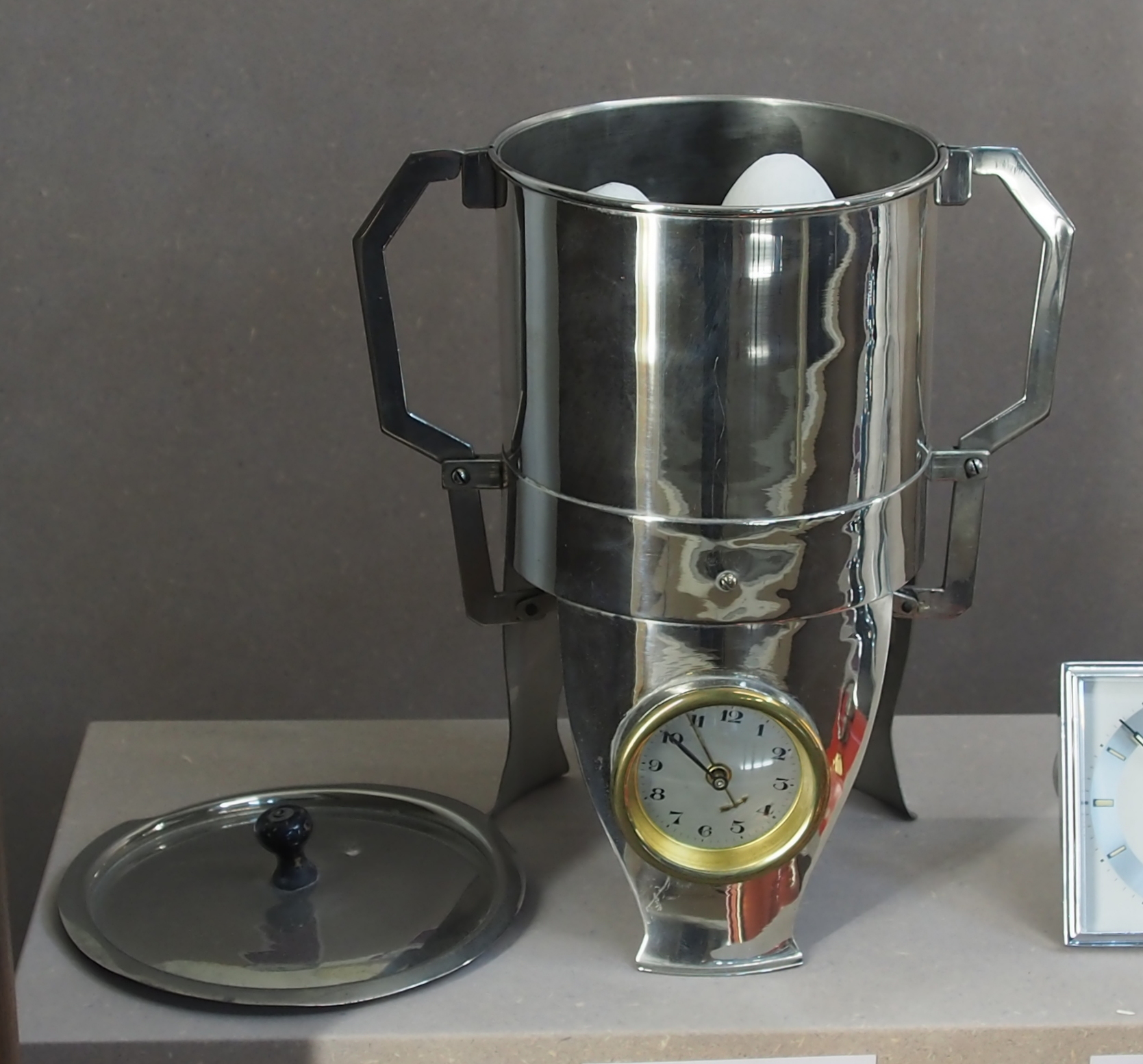
Egg cooking pot from 1932 with built-in timer

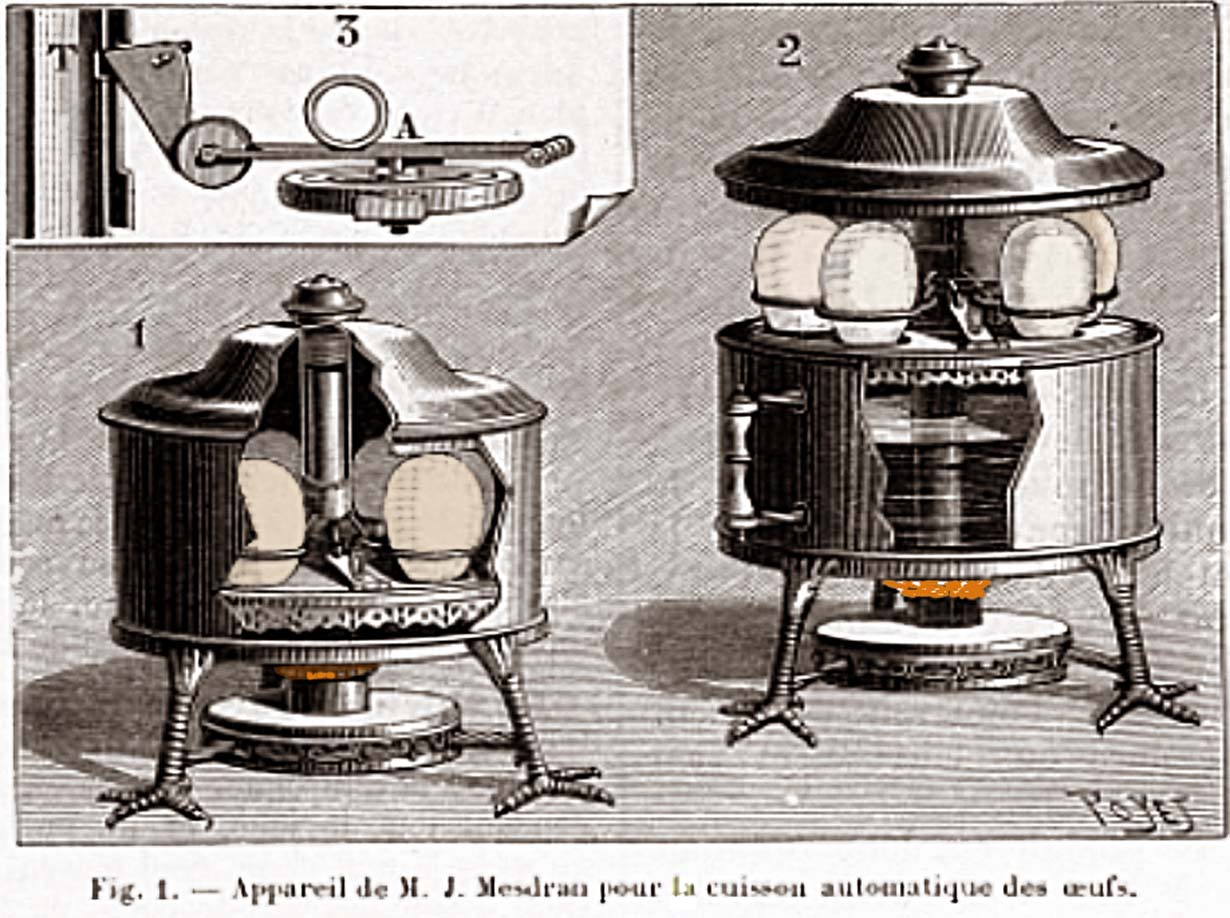
Automatic egg boiler from 1892 with spirit flame

== Physics of cooking ==
=== Heat transfer ===
Unlike traditional boiling, where heat is transferred via thermal conductivity through liquid water, an egg boiler relies on the condensation of steam. The primary mechanism for heat transfer is the release of latent heat during the phase transition of water from vapor to liquid on the colder surface of the eggshell.

Alternative heat transfer mechanisms are ineffective in this context:

- Thermal conductivity: The density of steam at 100 °C is approximately 1,600 times lower than that of water, making thermal conductivity through gas insufficient to cook the eggs in the observed time.
- Convection: Effective convection would require air flow velocities high enough to displace the lid.
- Thermal radiation: The temperatures involved are too low for significant radiative heat transfer.

Because of this mechanism, the surface temperature of the egg during steaming is lower than in traditional boiling. Measurements indicate the eggshell reaches approximately 87 °C in a steamer, compared to 100 °C in boiling water. Consequently, cooking times in a steamer are generally longer; for example, a soft-boiled egg may take 7–8 minutes to steam compared to 4–5 minutes to boil.

=== Water quantity paradox ===
A counter-intuitive feature of the egg boiler is the "reciprocal law" regarding water quantity: cooking a larger number of eggs requires a smaller amount of initial water to achieve the same degree of "doneness".

This phenomenon occurs because water vapor condenses on the cold surfaces of the eggs and drips back onto the heating plate to be recycled.

- A larger number of eggs provides a larger total surface area for condensation.
- This increases the rate of water recycling, which would extend the total time required to evaporate all the water if the initial volume were held constant.
- Extended exposure to heat would result in overcooked eggs.

To maintain a constant cooking time appropriate for the desired consistency (e.g., soft-boiled or hard-boiled), the initial volume of water must be reduced as the number of eggs increases. For hard-boiled eggs, the water reduction is estimated to be approximately 9–12 g per additional egg.

== Efficiency ==
Egg boilers controlled by water quantity are particularly energy-efficient because they heat the minimum amount of water required. The energy efficiency of an electric steamer is estimated to be around 25% when cooking six hard-boiled eggs. The theoretical energy required to hard-boil a single egg (raising its temperature from 5 °C to 100 °C) is approximately 20 kJ.

== See also ==
- Egg coddler
- Electric water boiler
- List of cooking appliances

== Sources ==
- ETM Testmagazin (2019). "Stets der gewünschte Härtegrad" [Always the desired degree of hardness] (in German).
- Flach, S.; Parnovsky, S.; Varlamov, A. A. (2022). "The egg steamer paradox". Physics Education. 57 (2): 025002. arXiv:2304.11441. doi:10.1088/1361-6552/ac3930.
- "Ein neuer Elektro-Eierkocher" [A new electric egg boiler]. Illustrierte Technik (in German) (13): 406. 13 January 1930.
- Mikrowelle.com (n.d.). "Mikrowellen-Eierkocher" [Microwave egg boilers] (in German).
- Vattenfall (2021). "Eier energiesparend kochen: Diese Methode ist die beste" [Cooking eggs to save energy: This method is the best] (in German).
