= Klebang Square =

Town square in Klebang, Malacca, Malaysia

Klebang Walk
- Town square
- Dataran Klebang
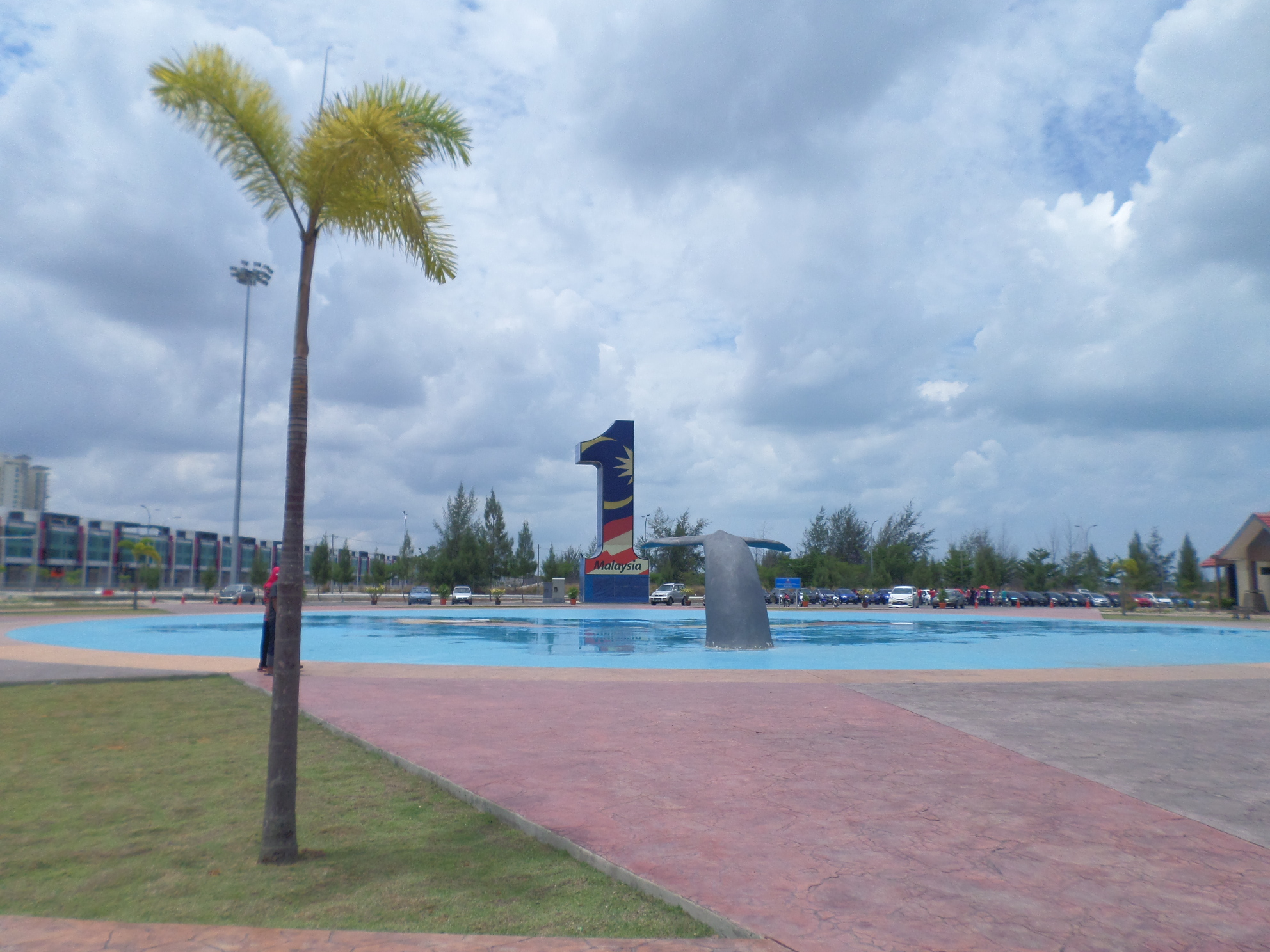
- Then-1Malaysia Square in 2015
- Opened: February 2012
- Location: Klebang, Malacca, Malaysia
- Location within Malacca
- Coordinates: 2°13′04.0″N 102°11′33.3″E

Klebang Walk (Malay: Dataran Klebang) is a town square in Klebang town in the Malaysian state of Malacca, featuring a whale fin sculpture. Formerly the 1Malaysia Square (Dataran 1Malaysia) which featured the 1Malaysia signage, the square was officiated by Prime Minister Najib Razak in February 2012. In December 2016, more than 20,000 peoples visited 1Malaysia Square to celebrate 755 years of Malacca. Following the defeat of the Najib-led Barisan Nasional political coalition in the 2018 Malaysian general election, the 1Malaysia signage was removed from the square. Following this, the square was rebranded as Klebang Walk in November 2023.

== See also ==
- List of tourist attractions in Malacca
- 1Malaysia
