= List of states and federal territories of Malaysia by Human Development Index =

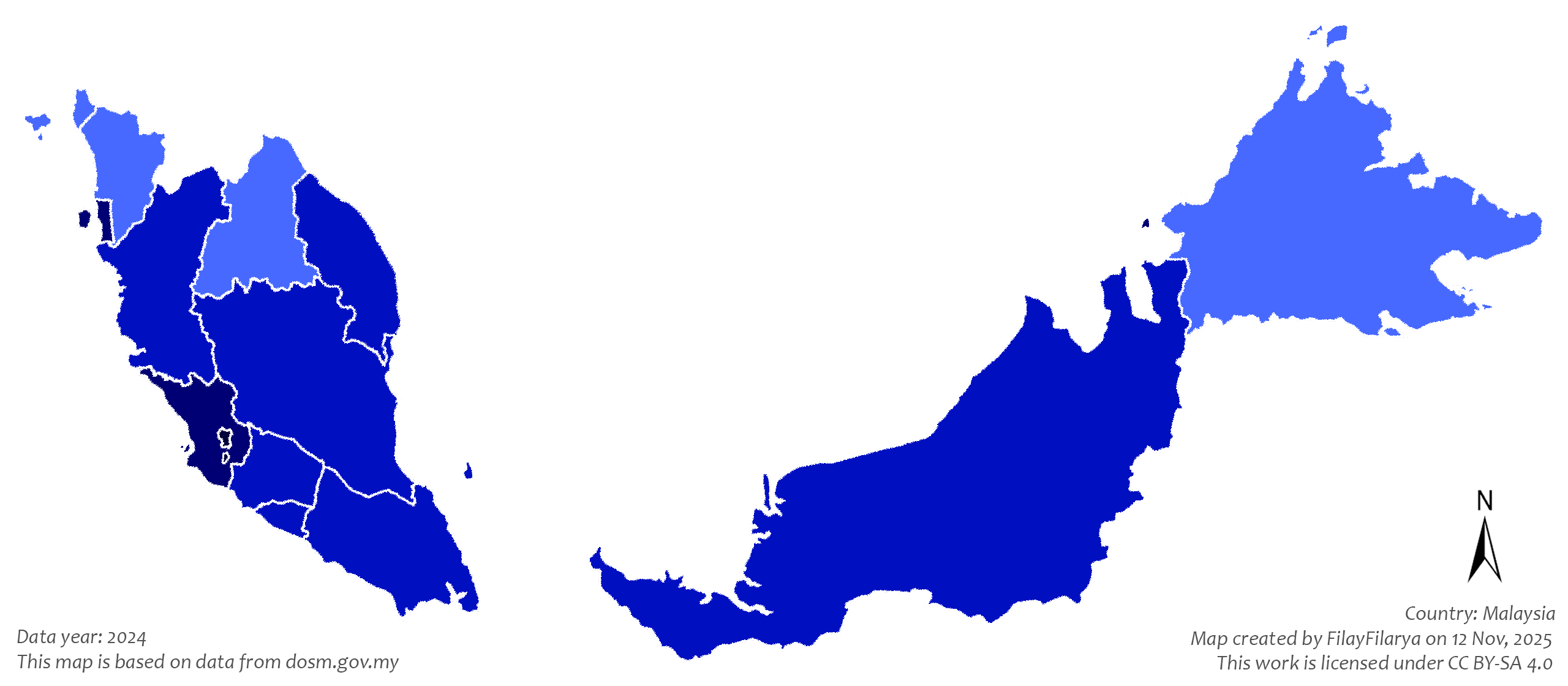
Map of Malaysian states and federal territories by Human Development Index in 2025. Legend: > 0.870 0.830 - 0.870 0.790 - 0.830 < 0.790

This is a list of Malaysian states and federal territories by Human Development Index (HDI) as of 2025.

This article uses the Malaysia Human Development Index (MHDI), which is an index developed by the Department of Statistics Malaysia (DOSM) to evaluate the level of human development which is the main criteria in measuring the progress of a country aside from economic aspects. The MHDI comprises three dimensions, namely: long and healthy life, access to knowledge, and a decent standard of living. The measure is developed based on the Human Development Index report from the United Nations Development Programme (UNDP).

Rank	State or federal territory	HDI (2025)
Very High Human Development
1	Kuala Lumpur	0.883
2	Putrajaya	0.878
3	Labuan	0.852
4	Selangor	0.849
4	Penang	0.849
6	Malacca	0.830
7	Negeri Sembilan	0.827
8	Sarawak	0.822
-	Malaysia (average)	0.819
9	Pahang	0.810
10	Johor	0.808
High Human Development
11	Perak	0.798
12	Terengganu	0.794
13	Perlis	0.784
14	Kedah	0.779
15	Sabah	0.767
16	Kelantan	0.765

== See also ==
- List of Malaysian states by household income
- List of Malaysian states by GDP
- List of countries by Human Development Index
