= David Allen =

David or Dave Allen may refer to:

== Film and television ==
- Dave Allen (comedian) (1936–2005), Irish comedian
- David W. Allen (1944–1999), American film and television stop-motion animator
- David Allen (special effects artist), American 1940s special effects artist
- Dave Allen (actor) (born 1958), American television and film actor
- David Allen, creator of BBC TV series Micro Live, 1980s

== Music ==
- Daevid Allen (1938–2015), Australian guitarist, founder of progressive rock bands Soft Machine and Gong, 1960s
- Rockin' Dave Allen (1941–1985), American blues guitarist and singer
- Dave Allen (born 1952), flautist in Australian rock band Flake and Galadriel
- Dave Allen (bassist) (1955–2025), bassist for 1970s rock band Gang of Four
- David M. Allen (born 1953), British record producer
- David Clark Allen, singer and founder of rock band Carmen
- Dave Allen (died 1986), guitarist and vocalist for punk band NOFX
- Dave Allen, American bassist for rock band Glassjaw
- Dave Allen, lead singer and guitarist for Irish rock band Hal

== Sports ==
- David Allen (baseball) (1858–1931), American baseball player
- David Allen (cricketer) (1935–2014), Gloucestershire cricketer
- David Rayvern Allen (1938–2014), cricket writer and historian
- David Allen (canoeist) (born 1943), British slalom canoeist
- David Allen (American football) (born 1978), American football running back
- Dave Allen (rugby league), rugby league pro footballer during 1980s
- David Allen (rugby union) (born 1981), English rugby union player
- David Allen (rugby league) (born 1985), Irish rugby league footballer of the 1980s
- Dave Allen (football executive) (born 1942), British sports businessman
- David Allen (boxer) (born 1992), British boxer

== Other entertainment ==
- David Allen (playwright) (born 1936), Australian playwright
- David Allen (game designer) (born 1972), video game designer

== Other people ==
- David Oliver Allen (1800–1863), American missionary
- William Edward David Allen (1901–1973), Irish-born English scholar, politician, and businessman
- David Allen (politician) (1937–2011), Irish politician
- David Allen (Royal Navy officer) (1933–1994), British Royal Navy officer, Defence Services Secretary 1988–1991
- David Allen (botanist) (1939–2023), British botanist working on East African legumes and UK conservation
- David Allen (author) (born 1945), productivity trainer and consultant
- David Allen (police commissioner), British politician and police commissioner

== See also ==
- Scott-David Allen (born 1973), American musician
- David Allan (disambiguation)
- Allen (surname)
- David Allyn (born 1969), American author, educator, and consultant to nonprofit organizations
