= List of states and federal territories of Malaysia by mean wage and median wage =

This article contains lists of Malaysian states and federal territories by annual mean wage and annual median wage.

The first table contains a list of Malaysian states and federal territories by annual mean wage. The second table contains a list of Malaysian states and federal territories by annual median salary.

As of 1 December 2025, 1 Malaysian ringgit (symbol: RM, currency code: MYR) was equivalent to 0.56 US dollar or 0.40 Euros. In 2025, Malaysia's mean wage stood at RM5,373 (US$1,316). Median salary in Malaysia within the same year was RM4,991 (US$1,223).

== Mean wage map ==
Map of Malaysian states and federal territories by annual mean wage as of 2025.

Light Blue	Above national mean
Orange	Below national mean

== Mean wage by state and federal territory ==
State or federal territory	Mean wage (RM)
State or federal territory	2025
Kuala Lumpur	10,931
Putrajaya	10,164
Selangor	9,507
Johor	9,228
Penang	8,603
Sarawak	8,295
Labuan	7,089
Malaysia	5,373
Melaka	5,068
Negeri Sembilan	4,776
Pahang	4,510
Terengganu	4,132
Kedah	4,025
Sabah	3,386
Perak	3,101
Perlis	2,643
Kelantan	1,708
Source: Department of Statistics Malaysia

== Median wage by state and federal territory ==
State or federal territory	Median wage (RM)
State or federal territory	2025
Kuala Lumpur	9,915
Putrajaya	9,340
Selangor	8,761
Johor	7,812
Labuan	6,431
Penang	5,820
Sarawak	5,076
Malaysia	4,991
Melaka	4,750
Pahang	4,201
Terengganu	4,008
Negeri Sembilan	3,893
Kedah	3,605
Perak	3,107
Perlis	2,870
Sabah	1,954
Kelantan	1,015
Source: Department of Statistics Malaysia

== See also ==
- Economy of Malaysia
