= David Allan =

David, Davie or Dave Allan may refer to:

- David Allan (broadcaster) (born 1940), British television announcer and radio presenter
- David Allan (cricketer) (born 1937), West Indian cricketer
- David Allan (cyclist) (1951–1989), Australian cyclist
- David Allan (footballer) (1863–1930), Scottish international footballer
- David Allan (painter) (1744–1796), Scottish painter
- David Allan (police officer) (1879–1961), British police officer
- David W. Allan (born 1936), American atomic clock physicist
- Dave Allan (racing driver) (1965–2012), British auto racing driver
- Davie Allan, American rock guitarist, 1960s

== See also ==
- David Allan Coe (born 1939), American country music singer
- David Allen (disambiguation)
