= List of states and federal territories of Malaysia by GDP =

This is a list of Malaysian states and federal territories sorted by their gross domestic product (GDP).

In 2025, Selangor, Kuala Lumpur and Johor are the top three contributors to Malaysia's GDP, generating more than 50% of the country's total economic output. GDP per capita varied widely across the country, with Kuala Lumpur, Labuan, Penang and Sarawak classified as high-income economies as of 2022.

== Gross Domestic Product by state ==
The following table is the list of the GDP of Malaysian states with current prices released by the Department of Statistics Malaysia.

Data for 2025 estimates (US$ 1 = MYR 4.28 at 2025 average market exchange rate, international $ (I$) using 2025 PPP conversion factor from World Bank (I$ 1 = MYR1.36)).

GDP by state or federal territory (2025)
<$10 billion $10 billion - <$40 billion $40 billion - <$80 billion >$80 billion

#	State or federal territory	GDP Nominal / PPP in US$ / Int$ (RM)										
#	State or federal territory	2025	2024	2023	2022	2021	2020	2019	2018	2017	2016	2015
Malaysia		473,219 / 1,489,249 (2,025,379)	421,898 / 1,380,208 (1,932,291)	399,760 / 1,274,758 (1,822,904)	407,127 / 1,133,771 (1,791,358)	374,129 / 1,025,760 (1,548,898)	337,735 / 933,217 (1,418,491)	365,395 / 969,703 (1,512,738)	358,356 / 916,303 (1,447,760)	319,141 / 852,366 (1,372,310)	301,132 / 806,256 (1,249,698)	301,007 / 764,247 (1,176,941)
1.	Selangor	123,435 / 388,458 (528,303)	105,960 / 346,642 (485,299)	98,744 / 314,875 (450,271)	95,827 / 243,589 (421,641)	83,087 / 227,803 (343,983)	77,810 / 215,003 (326,805)	83,335 / 221,158 (345,008)	80,003 / 204,566 (323,215)	70,275 / 187,693 (302,186)	67,913 / 181,831 (281,839)	68,753 / 174,561 (268,825)
2.	Kuala Lumpur	74,794 / 235,382 (320,120)	65,138 / 213,096 (298,334)	60,859 / 194,069 (277,519)	59,711 / 151,779 (262,730)	53,069 / 145,500 (219,706)	51,773 / 143,057 (217,447)	56,471 / 149,867 (233,794)	54,544 / 139,467 (220,359)	47,947 / 128,058 (206,174)	46,178 / 123,639 (191,641)	46,257 / 117,444 (180,865)
3.	Johor	47,433 / 149,274 (203,013)	40,914 / 133,846 (187,385)	31,401 / 120,163 (148,205)	47,537 / 89,909 (142,056)	31,715 / 86,955 (131,303)	30,493 / 84,259 (128,074)	32,421 / 86,042 (134,226)	32,323 / 82,649 (130,586)	28,735 / 76,745 (123,561)	28,116 / 75,278 (116,682)	28,133 / 71,429 (110,002)
4.	Sarawak	45,632 / 143,607 (195,305)	40,370 / 132,067 (184,894)	30,158 / 127,075 (142,352)	45,405 / 88,709 (140,161)	31,780 / 87,133 (131,572)	30,370 / 83,918 (127,556)	33,033 / 87,666 (136,759)	32,923 / 84,183 (133,010)	30,271 / 80,850 (130,169)	30,003 / 80,330 (124,513)	31,095 / 78,951 (121,585)
5.	Penang	34,887 / 109,790 (149,315)	29,889 / 97,779 (136,890)	24,567 / 89,925 (115,957)	27,535 / 70,966 (121,154)	23,939 / 65,636 (99,111)	22,069 / 60,980 (92,691)	22,861 / 60,669 (94,645)	22,582 / 57,743 (91,234)	20,178 / 53,893 (86,768)	19,877 / 53,221 (82,493)	19,986 / 50,744 (78,146)
6.	Sabah	28,358 / 89,243 (121,371)	25,007 / 81,807 (114,530)	24,541 / 78,256 (111,906)	27,758 / 77,938 (122,138)	19,081 / 52,317 (78,999)	18,533 / 51,210 (77,840)	20,686 / 54,898 (85,642)	21,042 / 53,805 (85,012)	19,486 / 52,045 (83,793)	18,679 / 50,011 (77,518)	18,868 / 47,906 (73,776)
7.	Perak	26,078 / 82,070 (111,615)	21,878 / 71,573 (100,202)	20,708 / 66,023 (94,427)	21,161 / 50,768 (93,112)	18,580 / 50,942 (76,923)	17,681 / 48,857 (74,264)	18,355 / 48,713 (75,993)	18,076 / 46,814 (73,031)	16,124 / 43,066 (69,337)	15,893 / 42,553 (65,958)	16,157 / 41,023 (63,176)
8.	Pahang	20,698 / 65,138 (88,587)	18,072 / 59,122 (82,771)	16,602 / 52,939 (75,703)	17,289 / 38,858 (76,075)	13,382 / 36,690 (55,403)	13,067 / 36,108 (54,885)	14,114 / 37,457 (58,434)	13,933 / 35,626 (56,290)	12,695 / 33,907 (54,591)	12,259 / 32,822 (50,875)	12,647 / 32,110 (49,450)
9.	Negeri Sembilan	16,450 / 51,768 (70,404)	14,602 / 47,768 (66,875)	13,883 / 44,271 (63,308)	13,684 / 32,177 (60,213)	11,541 / 31,644 (47,783)	11,032 / 30,484 (46,336)	11,602 / 30,791 (48,034)	11,310 / 28,920 (45,694)	10,189 / 27,214 (43,816)	10,065 / 26,949 (41,771)	10,277 / 26,094 (40,186)
10.	Kedah	15,393 / 48,442 (65,881)	13,198 / 43,190 (60,466)	12,397 / 40,312 (57,646)	12,812 / 32,239 (56,373)	11,476 / 31,464 (47,511)	10,962 / 30,290 (46,042)	11,314 / 30,026 (46,841)	11,090 / 28,356 (44,804)	10,015 / 26,749 (43,067)	9,917 / 26,552 (41,156)	10,115 / 25,681 (39,550)
11.	Malacca	14,379 / 45,251 (61,541)	12,472 / 40,800 (57,120)	12,150 / 38,745 (55,4050	11,544 / 28,790 (50,795)	10,120 / 27,748 (41,900)	9,769 / 26,993 (41,030)	10,527 / 27,937 (43,583)	10,489 / 26,820 (42,376)	9,495 / 25,360 (40,830)	9,087 / 24,330 (37,713)	9,226 / 23,426 (36,077)
12.	Terengganu	10,011 / 31,505 (42,847)	8,728 / 28,551 (39,972)	8,251 / 26,311 (37,625)	8,686 / 23,613 (38,221)	8,511 / 23,336 (35,238)	8,093 / 22,364 (33,994)	8,695 / 23,077 (36,001)	8,623 / 22,049 (34,838)	7,902 / 21,104 (33,979)	7,742 / 20,730 (32,133)	7,960 / 20,210 (31,124)
13.	Kelantan	8,131 / 25,588 (34,800)	7,161 / 23,427 (32,798)	6,859 / 21,871 (31,275)	6,887 / 17,022 (30,306)	6,231 / 17,084 (25,797)	5,997 / 16,571 (25,188)	6,154 / 16,332 (25,479)	5,975 / 15,280 (24,143)	5,465 / 14,596 (23,501)	5,415 / 14,500 (22,476)	5,475 / 13,901 (21,408)
14.	Putrajaya	3,439 / 10,824 (14,720)	Still merged with Kuala Lumpur data									
15.	Labuan	2,227 / 7,008 (9,531)	1,916 / 6,267 (8,774)	1,823 / 5,814 (8,314)	1,882 / 5,034 (8,285)	1,847 / 5,066 (7,650)	1,812 / 5,008 (7,613)	1,841 / 4,886 (7,623)	1,793 / 4,585 (7,245)	1,579 / 4,217 (6,790)	1,545 / 4,136 (6,412)	1,534 / 3,895 (5,999)
16.	Perlis	1,875 / 5,901 (8,026)	1,600 / 5,236 (7,330)	1,541 / 4,913 (7,026)	1,522 / 3,924 (6,701)	1,417 / 3,886 (5,868)	1,377 / 3,805 (5,785)	1,485 / 3,942 (6,151)	1,456 / 3,724 (5,885)	1,324 / 3,537 (5,695)	1,342 / 3,593 (5,570)	1,369 / 3,475 (5,353)

== Gross Domestic Product per capita by state ==
The following table is a list of the GDP per capita of Malaysian states released by the Department of Statistics Malaysia. Data for 2025 estimates (US$ at 2025 average market exchange rate, international $ (I$) using 2025 PPP conversion factor from World Bank)

GDP per capita by state or federal territory (2025)
<$10,000 $10,000 - <$15,000 $15,000 - <$20,000 >$20,000

#	State or federal territory	GDP per capita Nominal / PPP in US$ / Int$ (RM)										
#	State or federal territory	2025	2024	2023	2022	2021	2020	2019	2018	2017	2016	2015
1.	Kuala Lumpur	33,831 / 106,542 (144,898)	29,774 / 97,404 (136,365)	28,736 / 91,634 (131,038)	28,909 / 80,506 (127,199)	26,882 / 73,703 (111,292)	28,833 / 79,671 (121,100)	31,273 / 82,995 (129,472)	30,023 / 76,768 (121,293)	25,888/ 69,143 (111,321)	24,438 / 65,432 (101,420)	24,225 / 61,507 (94,722)
2.	Putrajaya	29,523 / 92,911 (126,359)	26,091 / 85,355 (119,498)	Still merged with Kuala Lumpur data								
3.	Labuan	20,739 / 65,267 (88,764)	18,996 / 62,145 (87,003)	18,332 / 58,459 (83,596)	18,557 / 51,678 (81,652)	19,648 / 53,870 (81,345)	18,309 / 50,590 (76,898)	18,791 / 49,871 (77,798)	18,400 / 47,048 (74,337)	15,336 / 40,962 (65,949)	14,899 / 39,892 (61,833)	14,981 / 38,037 (58,577)
4.	Penang	18,828 / 59,451 (80,584)	16,601 / 54,309 (76,033)	15,918 / 50,759 (72,586)	15,837 / 44,104 (69,684)	14,416 / 39,526 (59,685)	13,279 / 36,693 (55,774)	13,344 / 35,412 (55,243)	12,969 / 33,162 (52,397)	11,598 / 30,977 (49,873)	11,402 / 30,530 (47,322)	11,469 / 29,121 (44,847)
5.	Sarawak	17,233 / 54,233 (73,757)	16,032 / 52,447 (73,426)	15,880 / 50,637 (72,411)	18,377 / 51,175 (80,857)	15,935 / 43,689 (65,971)	13,316 / 36,796 (55,931)	12,888/ 34,204 (53,358)	12,945 / 33,101 (52,301)	11,471 / 30,637 (49,327)	10,682 / 28,601 (44,333)	11,256 / 28,579 (44,012)
6.	Selangor	16,440 / 51,736 (70,362)	14,390 / 47,076 (65,907)	13,704 / 43,701 (62,492)	13,615 / 37,916 (59,908)	12,543 / 34,390 (51,930)	11,573 / 31,978 (48,607)	13,284 / 35,253 (54,995)	12,754 / 32,612 (51,528)	11,183 / 29,870 (48,091)	10,750 / 28,784 (44,616)	10,897 / 27,669 (42,611)
Malaysia		13,824 / 43,505 (59,167)	12,387 / 40,524 (56,734)	11,976 / 38,190 (54,612)	12,469 / 34,723 (54,863)	11,458 / 31,416 (47,439)	10,351 / 28,601 (43,475)	11,219 / 29,775 (46,450)	11,059 / 28,279 (44,682)	9,820 / 26,228 (42,228)	9,370 / 25,088 (38,887)	9,489 / 24,093 (37,104)
7.	Malacca	12,986 / 40,867 (55,580)	11,911 / 38,966 (54,553)	11,825 / 37,708 (53,922)	11,456 / 31,903 (50,407)	10,775 / 29,543 (44,610)	10,205 / 28,198 (42,861)	11,877 / 30,960 (49,172)	11,871 / 30,354 (47,960)	10,701 / 28,580 (46,015)	9,966 / 26,685 (41,363)	10,192 / 25,878 (39,853)
8.	Negeri Sembilan	12,945 / 40,739 (55,406)	11,775 / 38,520 (53,928)	11,340 / 36,160 (51,709)	11,319 / 31,522 (49,804)	10,747 / 29,466 (44,495)	9,822 / 27,140 (41,254)	10,960 / 29,085 (45,373)	10,655 / 27,244 (43,047)	9,677 / 25,847 (41,615)	9,291 / 24,876 (38,559)	9,385 / 23,830 (36,699)
9.	Pahang	12,153 / 38,245 (52,014)	10,833 / 35,441 (49,617)	10,106 / 32,227 (46,084)	10,722 / 29,859 (47,177)	9,978 / 27,359 (41,313)	9,050 / 25,006 (38,010)	8,831 / 23,436 (36,560)	8,806 / 22,517 (35,577)	9,058 / 24,193 (38,952)	8,733 / 23,383 (36,244)	7,760 / 19,703 (30,343)
10.	Johor	11,222 / 35,316 (48,031)	9,773 / 31,973 (44,762)	9,189 / 29,302 (41,902)	9,331 / 25,986 (41,058)	8,810 / 24,154 (36,474)	8,070 / 22,300 (33,896)	9,020 / 23,937 (37,342)	9,008 / 23,034 (36,394)	7,991 / 21,342 (34,362)	7,699 / 20,614 (31,952)	7,554 / 19,181 (29,539)
11.	Perak	9,804 / 30,852 (41,960)	8,514 / 27,854 (38,996)	8,151 / 25,993 (37,170)	8,391 / 23,370 (36,924)	8,294 / 22,740 (34,338)	7,530 / 20,806 (31,626)	7,662 / 20,333 (31,719)	7,500 / 19,179 (30,303)	6,796 / 18,152 (29,226)	6,565 / 17,578 (27,246)	6,500 / 16,505 (25,418)
12.	Terengganu	7,630 / 24012 (32,657)	7,083 / 23,173 (32,442)	6,823 / 21,756 (31,111)	7,318 / 20,379 (32,199)	7,464 / 20,464 (30,901)	7,006 / 19,359 (29,426)	7,472 / 19,829 (30,933)	7,479 / 19,124 (30,216)	6,971 / 18,620 (29,347)	6,570 / 17,592 (27,268)	6,784 / 17,226 (26,529)
13.	Sabah	7,272 / 22,886 (31,125)	6,682 / 21,861 (30,605)	6,830 / 21,781 (31,147)	8,186 / 22,797 (36,020)	7,236 / 19,841 (29,960)	5,869 / 16,218 (24,652)	6,117 / 16,235 (25,326)	6,401 / 16,367 (25,861)	5,576 / 14,893 (23,979)	5,079 / 13,600 (21,081)	5,047 / 12,814 (19,734)
14.	Kedah	6,668 / 20,983 (28,537)	5,954 / 19,477 (27,268)	5,779 / 18,429 (26,353)	5,902 / 16,435 (25,967)	5,694 / 15,612 (23,575)	5,402 / 14,928 (22,693)	5,414 / 14,367 (22,412)	5,299 / 13,550 (21,410)	4,727 / 12,625 (20,327)	4,614 / 12,356 (19,152)	4,667 / 11,850 (18,249)
15.	Perlis	5,862 / 18,448 (25,089)	5,392 / 17,639 (24,695)	5,264 / 16,786 (24,004)	5,256 / 14,637 (23,126)	5,195 / 14,243 (21,508)	5,023 / 13,880 (21,099)	6,197 / 16,446 (25,656)	6,050 / 15,469 (24,442)	5,435 / 14,516 (23,372)	5,416 / 14,502 (22,479)	5,471 / 13,892 (21,394)
16.	Kelantan	4,225 / 13,297 (18,085)	3,792 / 12,406 (17,368)	3,692 / 11,773 (16,836)	3,765 / 10,485 (16,567)	3,764 / 10,320 (15,584)	3,559 / 9,836 (14,951)	3,464 / 9,193 (14,341)	3,383 / 8,650 (13,668)	3,161 / 8,442 (13,593)	3,087 / 8,265 (12,812)	3,088 / 7,840 (12,075)

== See also ==
- Economy of Malaysia
- List of ASEAN country subdivisions by GDP
- List of Malaysian states by household income
