= States and federal territories of Malaysia =

Malaysia is a federation of thirteen states and three federal territories, which form the primary administrative divisions of the country. Eleven states and two federal territories are located in Peninsular Malaysia, while two states and one federal territory are located in East Malaysia. Nine of the states in Peninsular Malaysia have monarchies, with the other four having appointed governors. State governments are led by chief ministers, who are appointed by the monarch or governor, provided they have the support of a majority in the state legislative assembly. The federal territories are directly governed by the federal government.

Malaysia was formed through the union of various territories ruled by the United Kingdom in British Malaya and British Borneo. The federal system was created to preserve the status of the Malay rulers, who governed the British protectorates in the Malay Peninsula. The Federation of Malaya was created in 1948, uniting these protectorates with two directly ruled British colonies. Malaya became independent in 1957. In 1963, Sabah and Sarawak, along with Singapore, joined with Malaya to form Malaysia, although Singapore was expelled in 1965. The three federal territories—Kuala Lumpur, Labuan and Putrajaya—were created later from land separated from existing states.

Under the national constitution, the national government wields unusually expansive powers for a federal system, including control over economic development and internal security. State laws must align with federal law, and with limited means to generate revenue, states remain heavily dependent on federal funding. Decades of uninterrupted rule by the Barisan Nasional coalition led to the further centralisation of power, and the national government has various ways to exert formal and informal control over state governments. Federal institutions with overlapping mandates allow the national government to influence areas constitutionally reserved for the states, and the national government controls the civil services of most state governments.

Sabah and Sarawak differ significantly from the other states, being geographically separate and having distinct demographics, economies, and politics. Both have more extensive autonomy than the other states, which was negotiated as part of the federation process and set out in the Malaysia Agreement. Both states thus maintain control over a number of competencies that in Peninsular Malaysia are assumed by the national government. They also have greater fiscal powers, independent legal and judicial systems, and their own immigration regimes.

== States and federal territories ==
Eleven states and two federal territories are located on the Malay Peninsula, collectively called Peninsular Malaysia or West Malaysia. Two states and one federal territory lie on the island of Borneo; they are collectively referred to as East Malaysia or Malaysian Borneo. Of the 13 states in Malaysia, 9 are monarchies.

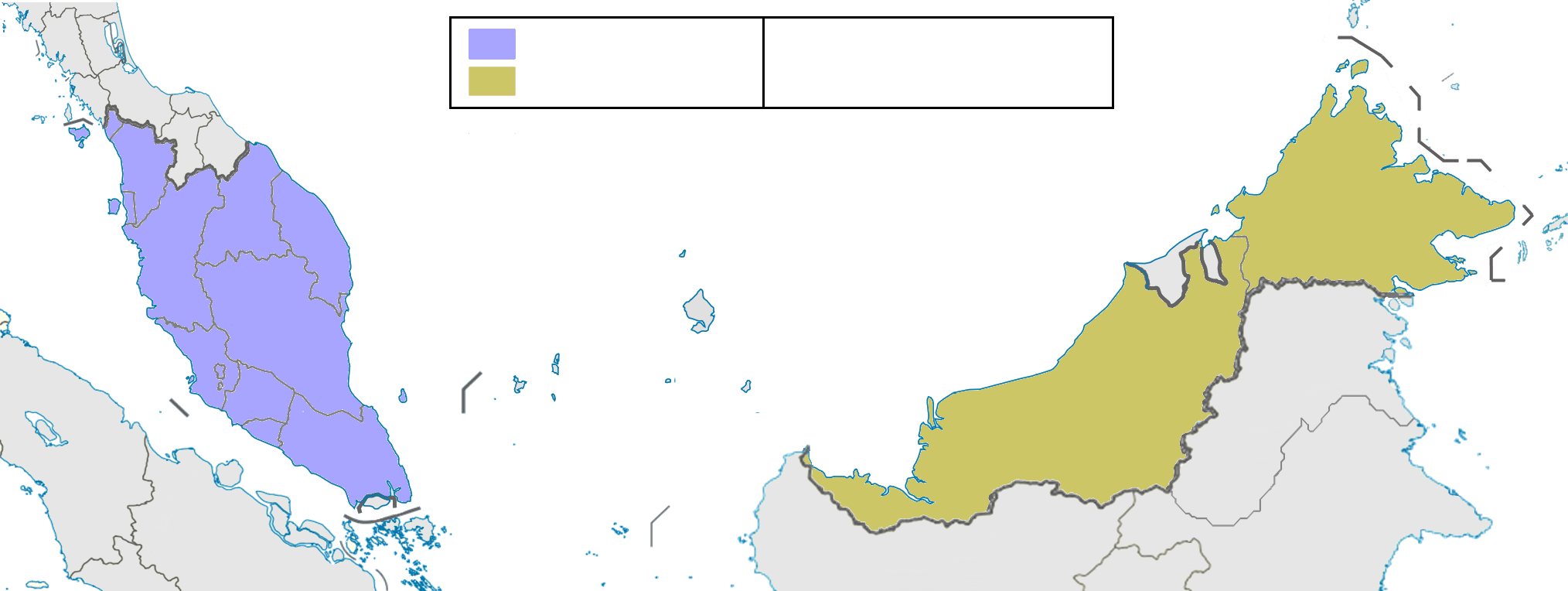

=== States ===
Flag	Emblem	State	Capital	Royal capital	Pop.	Area (km^{2})	Licence plate	Area code	ISO	HDI	Head of state	Head of government
Flag of Johor	Coat of arms of Johor	Johor	Johor Bahru	Muar	4,186,300	19,210	J	07, 06 (Muar & Tangkak)	MY-01	0.821	Sultan	Menteri Besar
Flag of Kedah	Coat of arms of Kedah	Kedah	Alor Setar	Anak Bukit	2,217,500	9,500	K	04	MY-02	0.804	Sultan	Menteri Besar
Flag of Kelantan	Coat of arms of Kelantan	Kelantan	Kota Bharu	Kubang Kerian	1,888,500	15,099	D	09	MY-03	0.774	Sultan	Menteri Besar
Flag of Malacca	Coat of arms of Malacca	Malacca	Malacca City	—	1,047,100	1,664	M	06	MY-04	0.831	Governor	Chief Minister
Flag of Negeri Sembilan	Coat of arms of Negeri Sembilan	Negeri Sembilan	Seremban	Seri Menanti	1,240,100	6,686	N	06	MY-05	0.825	Yang di-Pertuan Besar	Menteri Besar
Flag of Pahang	Coat of arms of Pahang	Pahang	Kuantan	Pekan	1,668,200	36,137	C	09, 03 (Genting Highlands), 05 (Cameron Highlands)	MY-06	0.801	Sultan	Menteri Besar
Flag of Penang	Coat of arms of Penang	Penang	George Town	—	1,800,400	1,048	P	04	MY-07	0.841	Governor	Chief Minister
Flag of Perak	Coat of arms of Perak	Perak	Ipoh	Kuala Kangsar	2,569,600	21,035	A	05, 04 (Pengkalan Hulu)	MY-08	0.812	Sultan	Menteri Besar
Flag of Perlis	Coat of arms of Perlis	Perlis	Kangar	Arau	296,800	821	R	04	MY-09	0.801	King	Menteri Besar
Flag of Sabah	Coat of arms of Sabah	Sabah	Kota Kinabalu	—	3,742,200	73,631	S	08	MY-12	0.772	Governor	Chief Minister
Flag of Sarawak	Coat of arms of Sarawak	Sarawak	Kuching	—	2,518,100	124,450	Q	08	MY-13	0.824	Governor	Premier
Flag of Selangor	Coat of arms of Selangor	Selangor	Shah Alam	Klang	7,363,400	8,104	B	03	MY-10	0.859	Sultan	Menteri Besar
Flag of Terengganu	Coat of arms of Terengganu	Terengganu	Kuala Terengganu		1,232,100	13,035	T	09	MY-11	0.796	Sultan	Menteri Besar

=== Federal territories ===
Flag	Emblem	Federal territory	Pop.	Area (km^{2})	License plate	Area code	ISO	HDI	Head of government
Flag of Kuala Lumpur	Seal of Kuala Lumpur	Kuala Lumpur	2,067,500	243	W / V	03	MY-14	0.863	Mayor
Flag of Labuan	Seal of Labuan	Labuan	100,800	91	L	087	MY-15	0.782	Chief Executive Officer of Labuan Corporation
Flag of Putrajaya	Seal of Putrajaya	Putrajaya	120,300	49	F	038	MY-16	N/A	President of Putrajaya Corporation

== Federal–state relations ==
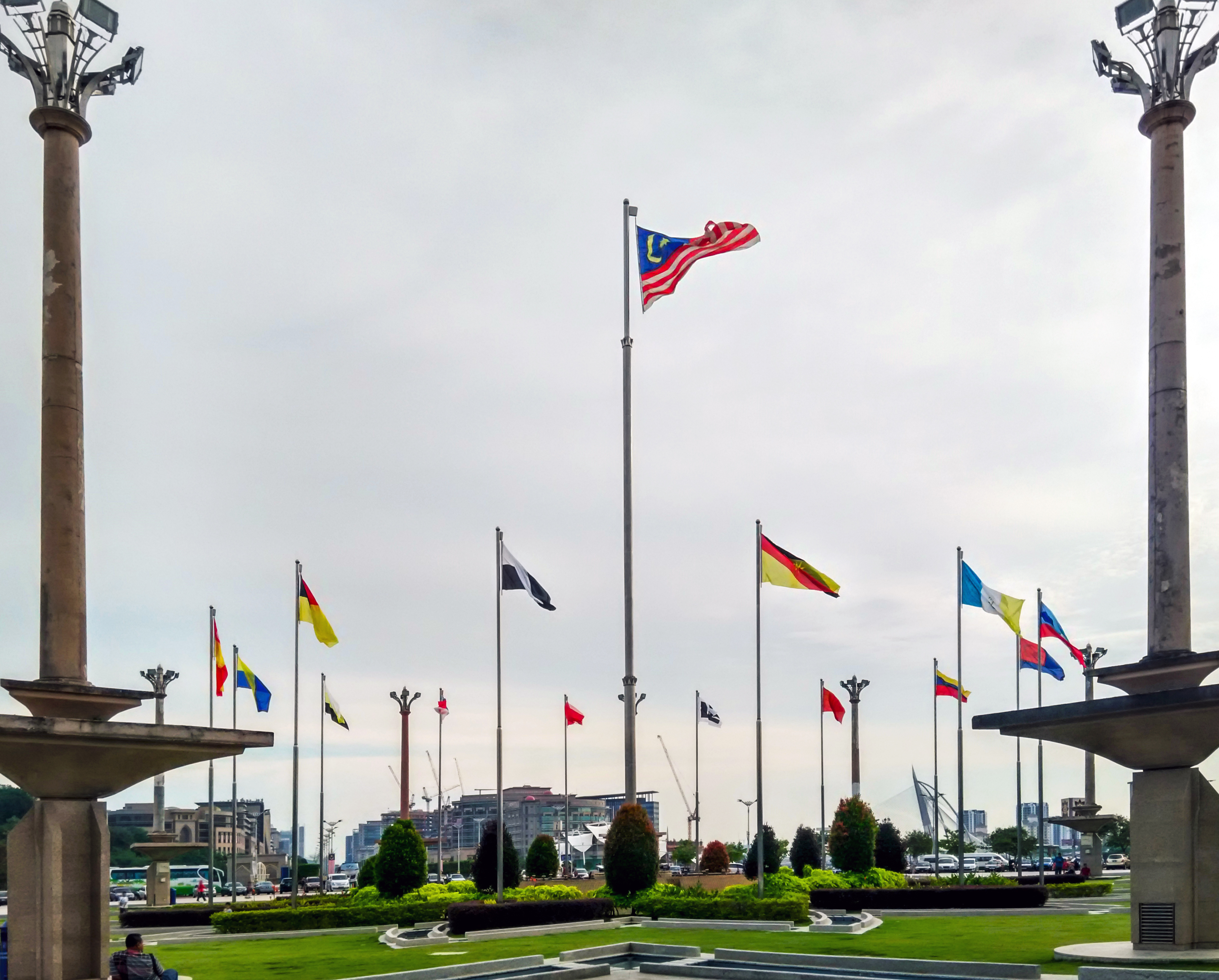
Malaysia and its states' flags at Putra Square, Putrajaya

While the population of Malaysia is ethnically and religiously diverse, such diversity is spread throughout the country and not inherently reflected by the borders of the states (however, there is a significant distinction between the peninsular states and Sabah and Sarawak, which have large indigenous populations). Instead, the establishment of a federal system preserved the identity of the pre-existing Malay sultanates and provided a constitutional role for their Sultans. In practice, the central government exercises the vast majority of power. This is not only due to the Constitution of Malaysia providing significant powers to the Government of Malaysia, but also to its power in practice exceeding constitutional expectations. The power of the national government compared to the states, especially during the uninterrupted decades of rule by the UMNO-dominated Barisan Nasional (BN) coalition, has seen the political system sometimes described as unitary with "federal features", "quasi-federal", or "minimalist" federalism. One former state chief minister of Malacca, Mohd Adib Mohamad Adam, opined that states in Malaysia have less power than the local governments of other federations. Prominent differences between the states are mostly limited to the governance of Islam, and in the functioning of their particular monarchy. In states without Sultans, the King fills the usual role of a Sultan regarding Islam.

While states have no power over the federal constitution, the central government can amend state constitutions. Where laws conflict, federal law takes precedence, although the constitution does contain provisions for judicial review upon a conflict arising between state and federal government, or between states. The Federal Court of Malaysia adjudicates such conflicts. Both the Prime Minister and the Conference of Rulers (made up of the heads of all states) advise the King on the appointment of judges.

The approval of the Conference of Rulers is needed for any changes affecting royalty, state borders (although not the admittance of new states), freedom of expression, citizenship, privileges given to federal and state parliaments, and federal guarantees regarding state constitutions. Aside from that, their role, and that of the King, is mostly symbolic and ceremonial. It is through their role in the states, and their representation in the Conference of Rulers, that the Sultans are able to wield informal influence.

The federal parliament can make state law to promote consistency between states, and amend state constitutions to align with the federal one. State rights can be suspended by the central government through the use of an Emergency Ordinance. The state of emergency gives the federal parliament sweeping powers under which even most federal constitutional constraints do not apply. The only limits are that changes cannot be made to the "sensitive issues" (customs of Malays and natives of East Malaysia, and also to religion, citizenship, or language). In some past federal-state disputes, such as in the 1966 Sarawak constitutional crisis and the 1977 Kelantan Emergency, the national government has seized control of state administration. The Internal Security Act 1960 and its replacement, the Security Offences (Special Measures) Act 2012, provide broad power to the national government to make detentions in the name of security, which has been used to target political opponents.

While the formal powers of states have remained mostly the same since independence, and while states retain similar administrative bodies, their power and capacity has been informally curtailed through various direct efforts of the national government, as well as being practically constrained by fiscal limitations. During the period of BN dominance, state branches of UMNO were often controlled by the central government, effectively meaning states could be controlled through party management. Many of the central government's powers are directly under the control of the Prime Minister's Department (PMD), which controls the Election Commission of Malaysia, the state-owned oil company Petronas, and the Federal Land Development Authority, among other departments. In multiple administrations, the Prime Minister has also held the position as Minister of Finance, further strengthening their fiscal control.

The legislature of each state selects two individuals to represent the state in the national Senate. The federal territories are altogether represented by four senators, who are appointed by the King on the advice of the federal government, along with the other 40 senators. State electoral boundaries do not cross national parliamentary boundaries used for the lower house, creating a direct geographical hierarchy between state and national parliament. Historically, most state elections (Sarawak being a notable consistent exception) have occurred alongside national elections, strengthening the electoral influence of the national government campaign. Beginning in 2020, many state electoral calendars began to diverge from the national one, meaning state issues were more widely discussed and state political leaders have gained larger public profiles. The diminishment of state power reflected similar losses of power elsewhere, such as in the national legislature, the judiciary, the media, and civil society, as the power of the executive government grew.

=== Division of powers ===
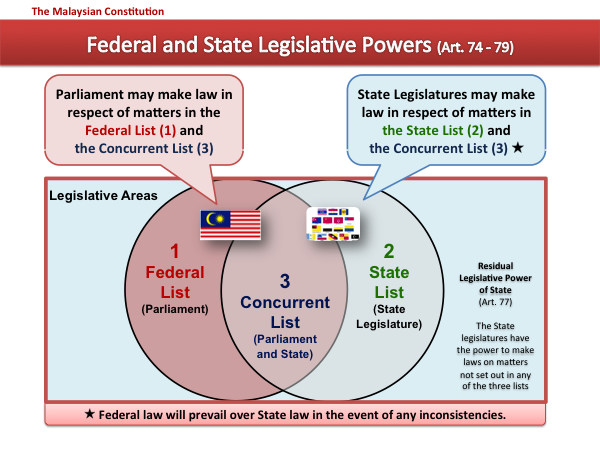
Federal and state competencies are laid out in the Ninth Schedule of the Constitution of Malaysia.

The Ninth Schedule of the Constitution of Malaysia divides powers into three lists: exclusively federal competencies, exclusively state competencies, and a concurrent list where both have input. The federal list includes trade, industry and development, foreign affairs, law, internal security and policing, and education. The state list includes Islamic law, native administration, local government, and land and natural resource use. The concurrent list includes welfare, water and irrigation, planning, culture, sports, and health. Per the constitution, laws affecting the concurrent list do not take effect for four weeks (unless the matter is declared urgent), theoretically to allow time for federal-state consultation on their implementation.

Administration of the law and courts is a federal matter. However, an exception is made for Islamic law, for which a separate Syariah Court system exists in each state. Since 1988, Syariah rulings cannot be appealed in the federal courts, and as there are no courts higher than the state courts, Malaysia has 14 (one for each state and one for all federal territories) distinct Syariah law systems. In Peninsular Malaysia, Syariah courts also rule on Malay customary law (adat), a pragmatic merger of these systems resulting from the constitutional association of Malay ethnicity and the Islamic religion. In Sabah and Sarawak, there are separate customary court systems for Malay customary law and for the customary law of other bumiputera. The central government does apply pressure on states to adopt similar Syariah laws, often through the Department of Islamic Development Malaysia, however differences remain in areas such as polygamy and female-initiated divorce. Kelantan has passed strong hudud laws mandating punishments under Islamic law. However, as Syariah courts may only enforce civil law and punishments are considered criminal law, such rulings are unenforceable.

Theoretically, any matter not set out in the Ninth Schedule can be legislated on by the individual states. However, legal scholars generally view this as a "pauper's bequest" because of the large scope of the matters listed in the Ninth Schedule. The courts themselves have generally favoured a broad interpretation of the language of the Ninth Schedule, thus limiting the number of possible subjects not covered. The Parliament of Malaysia is permitted to legislate on issues of land, Islamic religion, and local government to provide for a uniform law between different states, or on the request of the state assembly concerned. The law in question must also be passed by the state assembly as well, except in the case of certain land law-related subjects. Issues that fall under the purview of the state may also be legislated on at the federal level for the purpose of conforming with international treaty obligations. While states must be consulted before laws are introduced for this purpose, they have no right to veto, and resulting law becomes both federal and state law. However, the "sensitive issues" of Islamic law, Malay customs, and native laws and customs in Sabah and Sarawak cannot be modified for international treaty purposes.

=== Financing ===
The Tenth Schedule of the constitution sets out federal and state financing. States have very limited revenue generating powers, and thus limited funding. With most taxes, customs, and licensing controlled by the federal government, states mostly rely on natural resource revenue, and returns from entertainment and religious institutions. The management of land and its resources is the primary generator of state funding. These funding streams are highly dependent on geography, creating significant inter-state inequality, although even relatively rich states remain dependent on the federal government and unable to provide many services on their own. All states combined raised a tenth of what the federal government raised in 2016, and state expenditures amount to perhaps only 7% of overall government expenditure (another 3% comes from local government). (The federally funded Universiti Sains Malaysia, based in Penang, has double the budget of the entire Penang government.)

Federal grants are distributed to states to provide funding, usually tied to very specific purposes that have been approved by the federal government. Federal approval is also needed for state governments to borrow money, which is only allowed for capital expenditure. As the national government oversees economic development and has the authority to deny borrowing, it is effectively able to exercise control over major infrastructure projects. Some state funding is provided by the central government from revenues, allocated according to a constitutionally-mandated formula related to state population. Other grants are ad hoc. From 2013 to 2022, transfers to state governments fluctuated around 2.5% of total federal expenditure. Overall, states fund about 80% of their activities. Insufficient funds to meet their needs means many states take on debt from the central government. Existing imbalances between state contributions to GDP and fiscal transfers to states have led to calls for increased funding from states contributing relatively more than they receive in grants.

In some states, especially smaller ones, state government composition is influenced by the composition of the national government. This may help secure funding for the state. Many states have ceded some authority in order to balance their budgets, and the provision of subsidies as decided by the National Finance Council offers another method for the national government to influence state policy. While states appoint one representative each to the council, the federal government appoints others to the council, and council decisions are not binding on the Prime Minister.

=== Other federal influence ===
While the civil services of the former Unfederated Malay States (Johor, Perlis, Kedah, Kelantan, and Terengganu) are controlled by those states, those of other states are led by central government appointees. (Johor also uniquely possesses its own military forces.) Despite civil servant salaries being paid for by state governments, states lacking control over their civil service have no veto over appointments, and civil service activities can be directed by the federal government. This has led to state civil services at times being uncooperative with opposition governments. The federal government can establish joint services to manage matters relating to both the federal government and one or more states, or to two or more states. The federal government appoints local council mayors, and can directly fund local activities, thus bypassing state governments.

The creation of the overlapping institutions duplicated state government services, providing the federal government mechanisms for formal control over what are constitutionally state competencies. The constitutional mechanism whereby state parliaments can request the national parliament to legislate for them was used to create the National Land Code 1966 and the Local Government Act 1976, which were requested by all states (although they do not apply to Sabah and Sarawak). These laws provide uniformity across Peninsular Malaysia for what are constitutionally state competencies. Their operative institutions, the National Land Council and the National Council for Local Government (NCLG), create national-level policies that must be implemented by federal and state governments, thus facilitating national government control. Forestry outside of Sabah and Sarawak has also become uniform, as the National Land Council created the National Forestry Council in 1971, leading to the National Forestry Act 1984. Sabah and Sarawak have distinct local government systems, although both send non-voting representatives to the NCLG. The National Finance Council acts as a third overlapping institution, which increases central government control over state budgets.

State control over oil and natural gas has been appropriated through law by the federal government. The federal government also has direct control over six local authorities designated as "development authorities". While some were converted into federal territories (Labuan and Putrajaya), two remain in Johor, one in Pahang, and one in Kedah. Similar to its creation of overlapping institutions, the federal government also creates national economic corridors, which create mechanisms for federal control of land competencies formally assigned to states.

Outside of the three overlapping bodies and the Conference of Rulers, there is little coordination between state governments. The national government can request that a state government exercise executive or administrative powers constitutionally assigned to the federal government. Federalism is thus often a cooperative exercise between the central and state governments. If the federal government requests such actions, it must provide funding to the state for this purpose.

=== Sabah and Sarawak ===
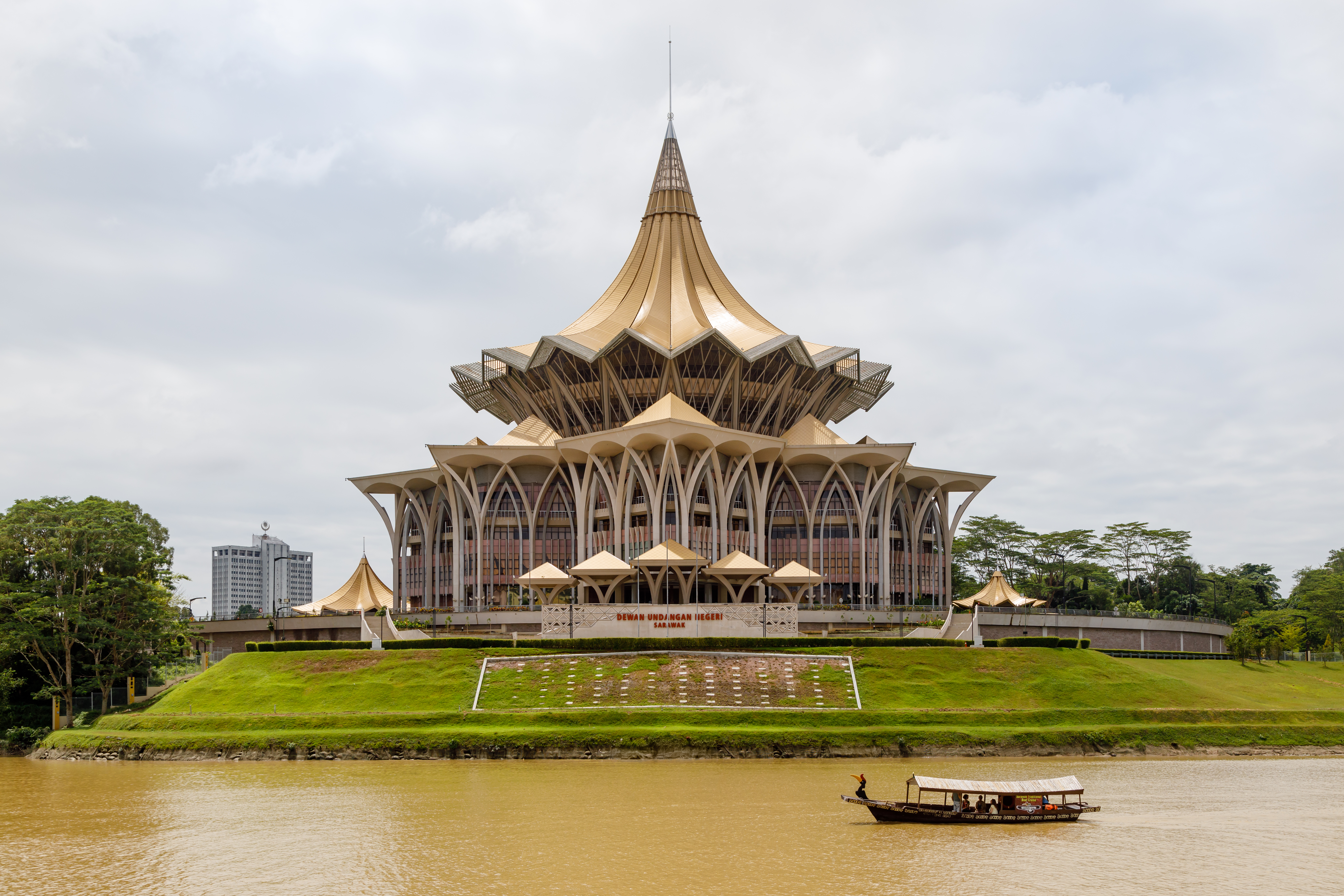
The building hosting the Sarawak State Legislative Assembly

The East Malaysian states of Sabah and Sarawak have greater autonomy that those on the peninsula, with lists of state power supplemental to those that apply to all states. This includes greater control of their land, development, immigration, native customs, religious affairs, historical sites, and ports and harbours. Water remains a state competency in Sabah and Sarawak, despite being shifted to the concurrent list for other states. Some federal laws, such as those relating to land and local government, do not apply in these states. Both also have greater fiscal powers, their own legal systems, and vetos on constitutional changes. They are not required to have Islam as an official religion, and can determine their own official language. Safeguards protect the appointment of judges in those states, and the provision of citizenship. Both states have a greater ability to borrow money, introduce tax (although this was not used until 1998), and apply export duties to natural resources. Sabah also has control over its railways. Their Governors have vetos over constitutional changes that affect their states, namely changes to the High Court in Sabah and Sarawak, to their state legislation, and to the rights of their indigenous people. Lawyers require a connection to either state to practice in its courts, unless given an exception by the state government. The greater autonomy granted to Sabah and Sarawak compared to other states renders Malaysian federalism asymmetric.

The Malaysia Agreement codified the terms by which Malaya, North Borneo, Sarawak, and Singapore became Malaysia.

Sabah and Sarawak did not have strong historical, cultural, or demographic links to Malaya at the time of federation. They also had vastly different economic needs. Their admittance to the federation came with agreements that they would retain a larger ability to managed their own affairs to reflect this. While both merged with the existing states of the Federation of Malaya and Singapore pursuant to the Malaysia Agreement in 1963, this was done by amendment to the Malayan constitution rather than creating a new legal basis for federation. Sabah and Sarawak still retained a higher degree of autonomy than the peninsular states in areas such as immigration, state revenue, and legislative power over land and local government. However, federal influence over their politics increased over time, including direct interference in the state assemblies.

Sabah and Sarawak control immigration themselves, as laid out in the Immigration Act 1959/63. This was intended to prevent West Malaysian immigration, but has at times been used to reduce federal government scrutiny. Malaysians of Sabahan and Sarawakian origin have unique residency rights and benefits. Peninsular Malaysians generally require passports to enter Sabah or Sarawak, or if using their biometric MyKad ID card or other approved identity document can obtain a special document upon arrival to Sabah or Sarawak. Both methods usually limit stays to a maximum of 90 days. A special document is required for longer stays.

Political relations between the Bornean states and the central government are often fraught, with the state governments fearing West Malaysian dominance, while the national government fears separatism. The historical erosion of autonomy has been linked to occasional calls for secession in both East Malaysian states, where such discussion is more common than it is in West Malaysian states. This is linked to the demographic and cultural differences already distinguishing these states from the others. While this discontent has sometimes been used by leaders in both states to extract concessions from the federal government, these concessions have often been directly associated with particular East Malaysian politicians, rather than producing structural improvements.

== State governance ==
The governance of the states is divided between the federal government and the state governments, while the federal territories are directly administered by the federal government. The nine peninsular states which joined the country as sultanates are known as the Malay states, and all have a monarch as their head of state. The rulers of Johor, Kedah, Kelantan, Pahang, Perak, Selangor and Terengganu are styled Sultans. Negeri Sembilan's elective ruler holds the title of Yang di-Pertuan Besar, whereas the ruler of Perlis is titled King. The federal head of state, the Yang di-Pertuan Agong (commonly referred to as "King" in English), is elected (de facto rotated) among the nine hereditary rulers to serve a 5-year term. Despite being constitutional monarchs, the rulers have significant informal influence, and are symbols of both the Malay ethnicity and Islam. The four states without monarchies (Malacca, Penang, Sabah, and Sarawak) instead have Governors (styled Yang di-Pertua Negeri) appointed by the Yang di-Pertuan Agong.

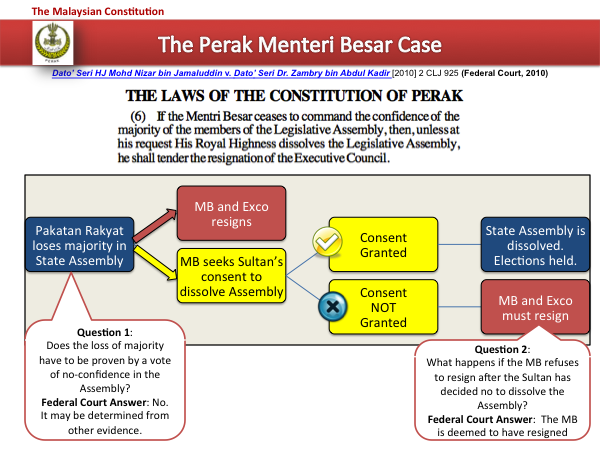
The 2009 Perak constitutional crisis, resolved in court through the Nizar v Zambry case, found that a chief minister could be replaced without a vote of no confidence.

Each state has its own constitution, which must conform with the principles of the national constitution. Each state also has a Westminster-style unicameral legislature called the Dewan Undangan Negeri (DUN), which vary in size between states from 15 members (Perlis) to 82 members (Sarawak). As with the federal parliament, members of DUN are elected through first-past-the-post voting in single-member constituencies. The average population represented within each state constituency differs between states. State constituencies are divisions of national constituencies. Thus, like the national constituencies, they are generally based on having similar populations, albeit with rural constituencies sometimes deliberately smaller. This urban-rural disparity is largest in Sabah and Sarawak. The term of DUN members is five years unless the assembly is dissolved earlier by the Ruler or Governor on the advice of the Chief Minister. Rulers and Governors hold discretionary powers in withholding consent to dissolve the DUN. While historically state elections mostly aligned with national elections, electoral calendars began to significantly diverge around 2020. Each state sends two senators elected by the DUN to the Dewan Negara (Senate), the upper house of the federal parliament. While the main court system is organised at the national level, each state has its own Syariah Court system.

States have an executive chief minister as politically responsible head of government. In the Malay states chief ministers are known as menteri besar, while in Malacca, Penang, and Sabah they are referred to as ketua menteri. In Sarawak, the title "premier" has been used since 2022. These are appointed by the relevant ruler or governor from the DUN if they have the support of the majority of the state legislature. The chief minister heads an executive council (known as the Council of State in Peninsular Malaysia, Supreme Council in Sarawak, and Cabinet in Sabah). State departments either report to the state government, or to the state government and the federal government. The latter includes the chief ministers department, except for those of Sabah and Sarawak (other historically state-run departments in those two states have become more similar to those of the Peninsular states).

Each peninsular state is divided into districts, which are in turn divided into sub-districts (mukim). The lowest level is the village (kampung), whose chief receives and allowance but is not considered a public servant. In Sabah and Sarawak, districts are grouped into "Divisions" (also called a "Residency" in Sabah), and these states have their own local government systems.

== Federal territory governance ==
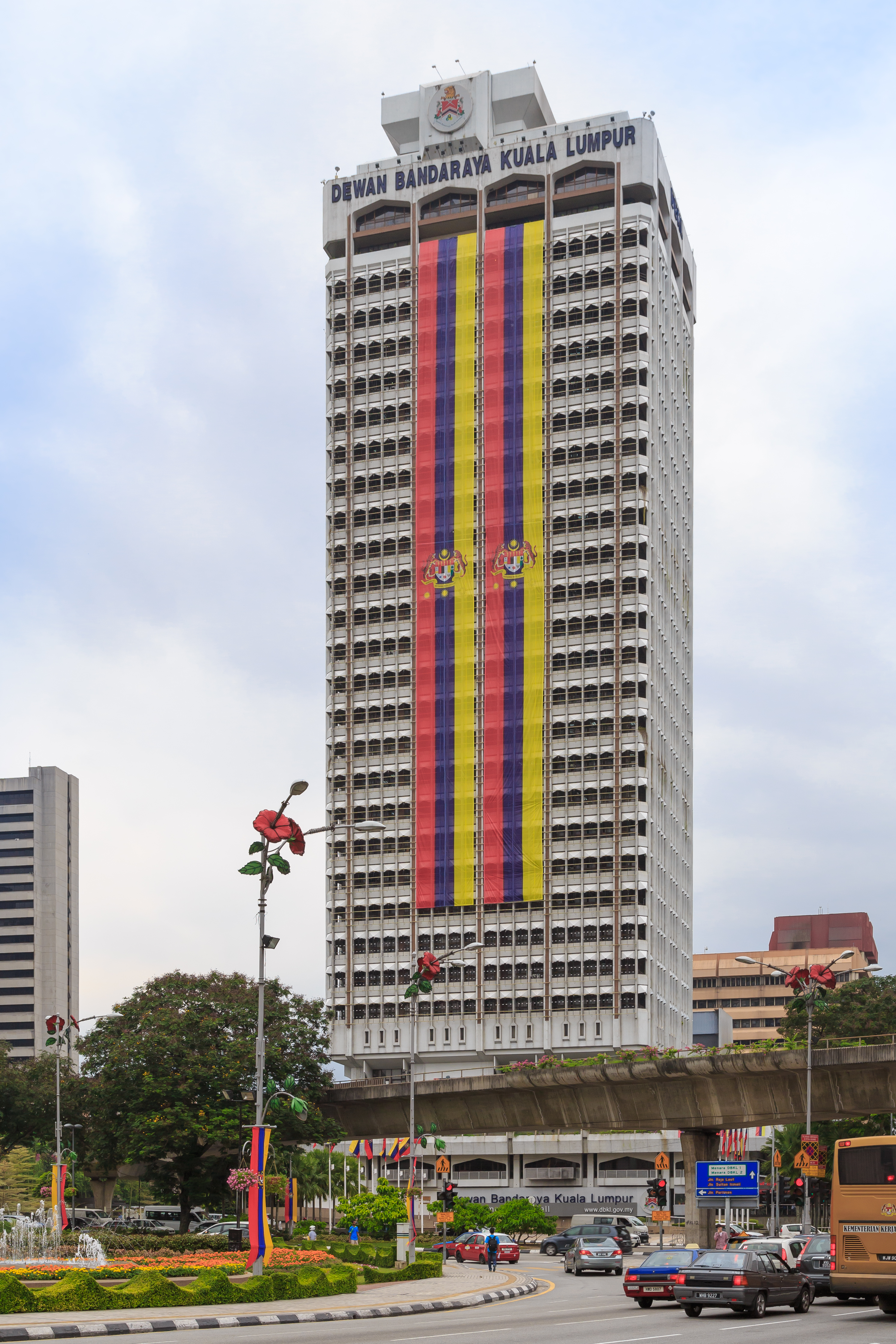
Kuala Lumpur City Hall decorated with the flag of the Federal Territories

The 3 federal territories were formed for different purposes: Kuala Lumpur was separated from Selangor to move Malaysia's national capital outside of any one state, Putrajaya was separated from Selangor as the administrative centre of the federal government, and Labuan was separated from Sabah to serve as an offshore financial centre. The territories fall under the purview of the Ministry of Federal Territories, and the Parliament of Malaysia legislates on all matters concerning the territories. Each federal territory elects representatives from single-member constituencies to the Dewan Rakyat (House of Representatives) of the Parliament: 11 for Kuala Lumpur, and 1 each for Labuan and Putrajaya. The Yang di-Pertuan Agong appoints senators to represent the territories in the Dewan Negara: two for Kuala Lumpur, and one each for Labuan and Putrajaya.

The federal government has jurisdiction over what would be state competencies in federal territories. There are no subnational elections in the federal territories, even in Kuala Lumpur, whose governmental budget exceeds that of most states. A joint Syariah legal system applies to all three territories. The local governments for the territories varies: Kuala Lumpur is administered by the Kuala Lumpur City Hall (Dewan Bandaraya Kuala Lumpur), headed by an appointed mayor (Datuk Bandar), while Putrajaya is administered by the Putrajaya Corporation (Perbadanan Putrajaya), headed by an appointed president, and Labuan by the Labuan Corporation (Perbadanan Labuan), headed by an appointed chief executive officer.

== History ==
=== Creation of the federation ===
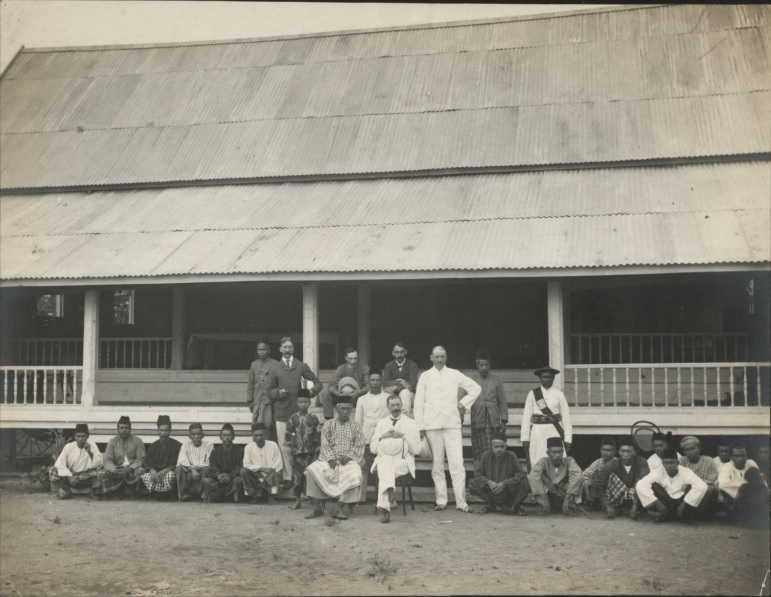
The Sultan of Pahang Ahmad Muʽazzam, and Acting Resident of Pahang, Frederic Duberly

Malaysia's federal system arose due the preservation of sultanates on the Malay Peninsula who came under British control. The initial British possessions in the region, Penang in 1786, Singapore in 1819, and Malacca in 1825, were directly controlled by the United Kingdom. However, later expansion was carried out through the establishment of protectorates. The 1826 Burney Treaty between the Rattanakosin Thailand and the United Kingdom saw the former relinquish its claims over Pahang, Perak, and all territory to their south, although the latter did not at the time claim this territory. In 1873, policy changes under John Wodehouse, 1st Earl of Kimberley, led to British intervention in the Larut Wars in Perak, the Klang War in Selangor, and in Sungei Ujong (now part of Negeri Sembilan). Beginning in 1874, Andrew Clarke forced the rulers of these sultanates to accept British oversight, establishing the residency system and creating the first formal protectorates.

Influence over the other small states that would form Negeri Sembilan, considered too small to host Residents themselves, was initially exercised through Abu Bakar of Johor, who British authorities in Singapore viewed as an amenable ally. By 1878, he had an official role in all these states except Sungei Ujong. However, ongoing disputes, and concerns about whether his heirs could maintain this influence, led the British to gradually expand their control from 1881 onwards. British Officers sent to these states played similar but informal roles to Residents. In 1889, several small states formally united into Negeri Sembilan. In 1898, a Resident was appointed, and in 1895 Sungei Ujong and Jelubu became part of the confederacy. A Resident was installed in Pahang in 1888, while the Anglo-Siamese Treaty of 1909 brought Kedah, Kelantan, Perlis, and Terengganu under British control. A protectorate over Johor was established in 1914, bringing all territory south of Siam under British control. The sultans who had moved from Thai to British sovereignty, along with Johor, resisted a full Resident, instead accepting less powerful Advisors. The establishment of such residents and advisors brought the sultans under indirect British rule, however it also strengthened their domestic strength, as British influence led to the development of new administrative structures that were headed by these sultans.

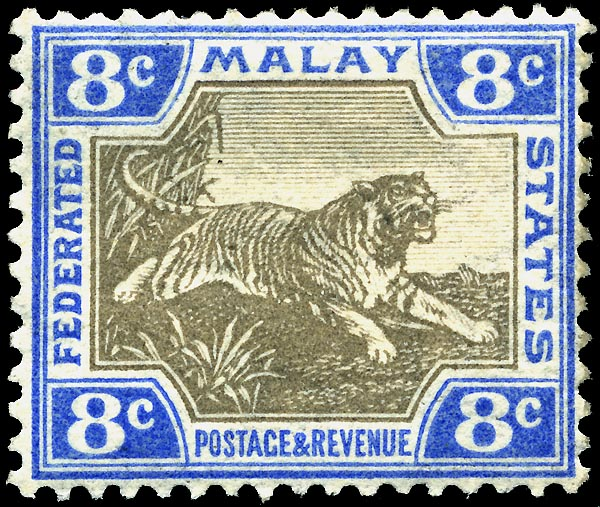
The Federated Malay States, consisting of Negeri Sembilan, Pahang, Perak, and Selangor, issued stamps as a single entity.

In 1895, the Federated Malay States was created, bringing Negeri Sembilan, Pahang, Perak, and Selangor under a shared governmental structure. The power of this new body over the individual sultanates was kept limited, to ensure the United Kingdom remained on good terms with the sultans. This set a precedent for later attempts at unification. The remaining five sultanates became known as the Unfederated Malay States, while the directly-ruled Penang, Malacca, and Singapore became known as the Straits Settlements. The demographics and economies of these groups diverged, with the Straits Settlements turning into cosmopolitan cities, while the Federated Malay States saw Chinese and Indian immigration to urban areas. In rural areas, and among the Unfederated Malay States, the population remained mostly Malay, and economies grew more slowly. The civil services of each of the Federated Malay States were merged with that of the Straits Settlements, creating a single Malayan Civil Service. Other services, including police, health, education, and law, also saw consolidation across borders.

However, efforts to further unite these separately governed territories faced resistance until the Japanese invasion during the Second World War in 1942. Shortly after the end of Japanese occupation, the nine sultanates under British protection, along with Malacca and Penang, were merged into the Malayan Union in 1946. This was highly unpopular among the Malay population, due to factors such as the Union's strong central government removing most power from the sultans. British hopes that Malay loyalties would shift from the sultans to the newly proposed nation were not realised. The reduction of the sultans' powers was viewed as a threat to Malay sovereignty and became intertwined with the Union's proposal to grant citizenship to non-Malays. Opposition coalesced under the ethnic Malay UMNO party. In some cases, Malay anger even affected the sultans, who were blamed for signing the treaty that founded the Union.

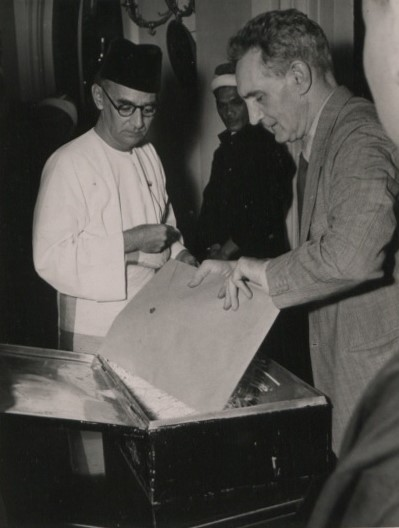
Johor chief minister Onn Jaafar and British official William Linehan preparing the Federation of Malay Agreement, 1948, for signing by the Sultan of Johor

In 1948, the Union was replaced with the 11-state Federation of Malaya, which was more closely modelled on the Federated Malay States, meaning sovereignty lay with the sultans. This federation was structured to preserve the identity of the component states, and included consultation mechanisms for when there was disagreement between state and central government. The agreement of the sultans (who formed the Conference of Rulers) was needed for any constitutional change. The new federation also reduced the inclusion of non-Malays. Resulting discord led to a State of Emergency being declared in June 1948, which would last until 1960. This mostly ethnic Chinese communist rebellion for independence was not supported by Malay leaders, but did provide pressure to move Malaya towards independence.

The Alliance coalition, made up of the Malay UMNO, the Malayan Chinese Association, and the Malayan Indian Congress, decisively won the 1955 Malayan general election. This gave Alliance significant input into the development of a constitution. However, Alliance was forced to negotiate with the sultans as it established governmental structures. While Alliance was led by the Malay UMNO, it incorporated Chinese and Indian parties whose members were less concerned with preserving the power of the sultans. The eventual constitution gave the central government significant power, in part influenced by a desire to grow the economy and to combat the ongoing rebellion. It also entrenched the idea that the federation would give greater privileges to Malays than to other ethnic communities.

The new constitution was completed by the Reid Commission in 1957, with its federal system inspired by the Constitution of India.Malaya became independent under its new constitution in 1957, overcoming independence movements in Johor, in Kelantan, and in Penang. Alliance convincingly won the first post-independence election in 1959, winning 9 of the then-11 states.

=== Creation of Malaysia ===
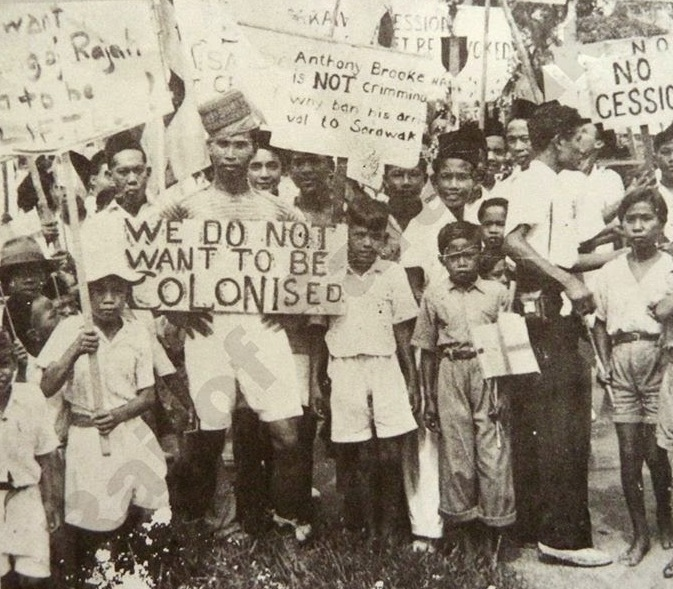
Protestors in Sarawak objecting to the territory becoming a British crown colony

In 1888, Brunei, North Borneo (today Sabah), and Sarawak–all located on the island of Borneo–became British protectorates. This was initially a loose arrangement, with the territories not receiving Residents. After the Japanese occupation during the Second World War, North Borneo and Sarawak came under direct British control as crown colonies in 1946. These territories shared little historical, demographic, or economic connection with Malaya, and also differed significantly from one another. Sarawak developed a distinct political identity in the mid-19th century, while Sabah remained only loosely administered. Brunei was led by a sultan who was reluctant to join a federation. British officials doubted that these territories could survive independently, given their limited development and vulnerability to neighbouring powers, and thus sought to establish a larger union to ease the process of decolonisation. However, feeling unable to impose this unilaterally, the British instead worked to secure support from urban elites in North Borneo and Sarawak.

Ideas for constitutionally linking Britain's various Southeast Asian territories, including the concept of closer links within Borneo or within Malaya, had been on occasion raised since the late 19th century. However, such ideas did not receive serious consideration until the end of the Second World War and the growing importance of decolonisation. While Singapore was maintained as a naval base, a future merger with Malaya was widely thought optimal. One proponent for an even broader federation was the Commissioner-General for Southeast Asia, Malcolm MacDonald, who undertook discussions on the idea as early as 1951. He achieved tentative support from the Governors of North Borneo and Sarawak in 1954, and also placed the issue on the agenda of a committee set up that same year to provide a venue for bilateral coordination between Malaya and Singapore. Other British officials were less favourable to MacDonald's "grand design". While MacDonald ended his term in July 1955, the idea of merger was adopted by Singaporean politicians who continued to seek discussion with Malaya on the concept. Views in North Borneo and Sarawak were thought to be slightly but not strongly favourable to a merger, and while it was thought the Sultan of Brunei would be interested in a merger with Malaya, he would be less interested in a merger with the other Bornean territories.

British authorities were reluctant to grant Singapore independence on its own, yet wished to maintain good relations with its leadership. Consequently, rather than imposing a decision, Britain aimed to facilitate negotiations among all parties to establish some form of union. Malayan politicians, led by Prime Minister Tunku Abdul Rahman, were reluctant to unite Malaya with the ethnically-Chinese dominated Singapore. The potential inclusion of North Borneo and Sarawak, both with large non-Chinese populations, helped assuage Malayan concerns about incorporating Singapore. Singaporean leaders also acted to show acceptance of special position for Malays, including adopting Malay as its official language and adopting a Malay-language national anthem in 1959.

Serious discussions on a merger began in the early 1960s. In January 1960, UK Prime Minister Harold Macmillan gave his "Wind of Change" speech, envisioning more British colonies becoming independent. The already independent Malaya was seen as an economic success. Singaporean leader Lee Kuan Yew, under whom Singapore became self-governing in 1959, saw union with Malaya as crucial not only for Singapore's economic interests, but for its security. Although the Malayan Emergency had ended, the ongoing Cold War and continued regional insurgencies sustained fears of potential communist takeovers. Indonesia was also seen as a threat, with its leader, Sukarno, viewing Malaya as a neo-colonial project, and believing Malaya supported the 1958 PRRI/Permesta rebellion in Indonesia. In July 1960, Indonesia began dedicated efforts to annex Western New Guinea, which it achieved in August 1962. Its relations to China grew closer, and there were concerns it would seek further territorial expansion. In January 1960, the Deputy Commissioner-General for Southeast Asia Dennis Allen held a meeting in Singapore to discuss the "grand design" of a potential large federation. While it was thought that the people of North Borneo and Sarawak would resist a potential replacement of British officials with Malay or Chinese ones, Brunei was viewed as more Malay-leaning and thus a potential offset to Singapore's ethnic Chinese population. Potential configurations considered following this discussion were a union of just North Borneo and Sarawak, a union of all three Bornean territories, a union of Malaya and Brunei, and a wider union of all five territories.

Tunku, concerned by potential Indonesian intentions in Borneo, separately approached Minister of State for Colonial Affairs, Lord Perth, in June 1960, to suggest either a merger of all five territories, or a limited merger of Malaya, Brunei, and Sarawak. In October, the Commissioner-General for Southeast Asia Lord Selkirk held a meeting in Kuching, which agreed the British government should be advised to open discussions about a merger with Tunku, Lee, and the Sultan of Brunei, but that the process should be gradual and not be seen as being forced by Britain. With the political interests of leaders in Malaya and Singapore having converged with British strategic interests, the federation of Malaya with Brunei, North Borneo, Sarawak, and Singapore moved forward. Lee met with Tunku in April 1961, and while Tunku did not agree with the idea of a merger, he requested further information from Lee. With Lee receiving encouragement from British officials, Lee sent a paper to the Malayan government in May. Lee believed that Razak was in favour, and could win over Tunku to the idea.Secretary of State for Commonwealth Relations Duncan Sandys also sought to covince Tunku of the merits of a larger federation. A by-election in Singapore in which Lee's PAP lost a seat also raised Tunku's concern about political instability on the island.

Tunku Abdul Rahman first publicly proposed the idea of a larger union in May 1961, as his concern of a potentially hostile communist Singapore outweighed his earlier reluctance to integrate it into Malaya. This concern was sharpened by the Cuban Missile Crisis. Malayan Deputy Prime Minister Abdul Razak Hussein believed a merger would help counter growing leftist politics in Singapore. In June Tunku wrote to Macmillan suggesting Brunei, North Borneo, and Sarawak be added as states to Malaya as an immediate step, and a federation with Singapore coming soon afterwards. As Singapore's constitution was due for revision in 1963, Tunku suggested negotiations finish before that point. In August, a meeting in Jesselton, North Borneo, saw the formation of the Malaysian Solidarity Consultative Committee. This committee, led by Donald Stephens, met four times between then and February 1962, and on 3 February expressed unanimous support for merger. The question of federation was seen as urgent in 1962, as defections from those opposed to union brought Lee close to losing power in Singapore. Domestic opposition to merger emerged in Sarawak and Malaya as well, often for different reasons. Opponents included the Malayan Communist Party, Pan Malayan Islamic Party, Malayan Peoples' Socialist Front, and Sarawak United Peoples' Party.

Sarawakian authorities, concerned with public opinion, advised radio stations to stop referring to the proposed federation as Melayu Raya, due to the term's focus on ethnic Malays. Sarawak's parties were divided not only on federation, but on the process, including whether there should be a period of independence first. In January 1962, the Sarawakian government issued a document titled "Sarawak and Malaysia" and sent versions in the local language to each district, where officials were tasked with discussing the document with the public. Local leaders were brought to the more developed Malaya to highlight the economic possibilities following federation. While some officials opposed the concept, on 15 February 51 of the 54 Dayak penghulu (leaders) led by Jugah Barieng agreed on 13 initial conditions under which they would support federation. Tunku, when visiting Miri in Sarawak in 1962, apologised for describing Sarawak native groups as Malays.

The British and Malayan Cobbold Commission surveyed North Borneo and Sarawak, determining there was overall support for the idea of federation, albeit with a desire "for conditions and safeguards varying in nature and extent". Macmillan and Tunku met in July 1962, where they agreed on a joint path forward and an expected federation date of 31 August 1963. North Borneo and Sarawak were offered various safeguards and areas of additional autonomy to secure their support. The offer to North Borneo became known as the 20-point agreement. A referendum in Singapore supported the PAP's goal of federation.

The December 1962 Brunei revolt accelerated movement towards a federation. In Singapore, security countermeasures included the detaining of political opposition. In Sarawak, which bordered Brunei, the revolt sharpened public perception of the threat of Indonesia. This was especially significant among the Dayak people, many of whom resigned from the then anti-federation Sarawak United Peoples' Party. The Sarawakian government's argument that Malaysia was needed for security was reinforced by an Indonesian attack on a police station, which began the Konfrontasi. Elections in North Borneo and in Sarawak confirmed support for federation. Negotiations with Brunei foundered, and Brunei pulled out in June 1963.

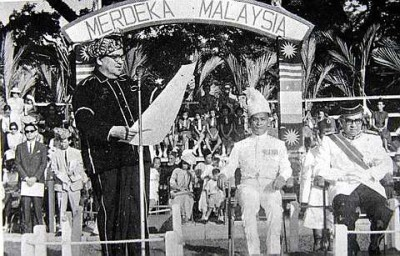
Sabahan chief minister Fuad Stephens declaring the formation of Malaysia on 16 September 1963

In September 1963, Malaya joined with three new states: Sabah, Sarawak, and Singapore, establishing Malaysia. This expansion, sometimes also described as the creation of a new federation, was confirmed with the Malaysia Agreement, under which the new states had greater autonomy than the 11 existing states. Sabah and Sarawak were given outsize electoral influence in the national parliament, compared to their populations. This was partially an enticement to join the federation, and partially to reduce the electoral influence of the mostly-Chinese Singapore (although the expulsion of Singapore from the federation did not affect Sabah and Sarawak's seats). The two states were also not included in the periodic review of electoral constituencies that covered the other states, instead being granted separate processes.

External opposition to the federation from Indonesia and the Philippines was assuaged in the July 1963 Manila Accord, under which Malaya committed to verify support from the populations of North Borneo and Sarawak. A United Nation mission began its survey on 16 August, and on 14 September the United Nations announced that federation was acceptable under the principle of self-determination. Initially planned to occur on 31 August (the date of Malaya's independence), federation was delayed until 16 September to allow the United Nations mission to finish its work. It was expected that the winner of the April 1963 Miss World Malaysia would be part of the ceremonies, however the winner was from Brunei and so did not participate due to Brunei's withdrawal.

The Malaysia Agreement saw the original Constitution of Malaya amended, rather than the creation of a new constitution. Constitutional changes were agreed by the Inter-Governmental Committee led by Lord Lansdowne, with Abdul Razak Hussein as his deputy. While the new states received some different accommodations through the amendments, the constitution was substantially similar to its previous form. Of the existing 181 articles in the constitution, 81 were amended. Many of the autonomy provisions were included through 35 newly created articles. 10 of the 13 constitutional schedules were also modified. It is not known if the Conference of Rulers gave its approval for the expansion of the country, indicating the early dominance of the central government. A late legal action by Kelantan (governed by the Pan Malayan Islamic Party), which argued the expansion effectively abolished the previous federation and thus that it should not bind Kelantan, was dismissed by the Supreme Court two days before merger.

While politics in Sabah and Sarawak were new and developing within the context of the new federation, politics in Singapore was more established. Singapore's People's Action Party (PAP) agreed with the new constitution, but quickly found its power limited due to Alliance dominance of the federation. In the 1964 Malaysian general election the PAP decided to contest a small number of seats at both the state and federal level (15 and 9 respectively) outside of Singapore, in opposition to the MCA. The PAP won only one seat, and ended up in conflict with not just the MCA, but UMNO, who openly supported MCA candidates. Subsequently, the PAP positioned itself in opposition to the whole Alliance, under the slogan of "Malaysian Malaysia", challenging the racial provisions of the constitution. The PAP joined with other opposition parties to form the Malaysian Solidarity Convention, and sought not only ethnic Chinese votes but directly sought Malay ones. Escalating disagreements between Alliance and PAP included not only race relations but other issues such as revenue sharing. Singapore was expelled from the Federation to become an independent state in 1965, leaving the current 13 states. The expulsion was kept secret from the British government until it occurred. Singaporean minister E. W. Barker created a mutual agreement to ensure the separation was smooth, based on the dissolution of the British West Indies. Malaysia recognised Singapore immediately, and the agreement continued water arrangements already in place between Singapore and Johor.

External pressure on the federation coincidentally ended at this time, as Sukarno was overthrown and the Indonesia–Malaysia confrontation ended. The sudden departure of Singapore caused tensions with Sabah and Sarawak, whose leaders saw this as a signal to reassess their own relationships with Kuala Lumpur. Discussion even emerged of finding a way for Sabah and Sarawak to maintain links with Singapore rather than Malaya. However, the national government began to exercise more power in Sabah and Sarawak. Sabahan former chief minister Fuad Stephens was removed from the federal government after requesting a renegotiation. Sarawakian Chief Minister Stephen Kalong Ningkan was later forced out by the federal government due to his support for state rights. Foreign civil servants in Sarawak were requested to leave by 1967. Local parties in Sabah and Sarawak later closely aligned themselves with Alliance.

=== Dominant party rule ===
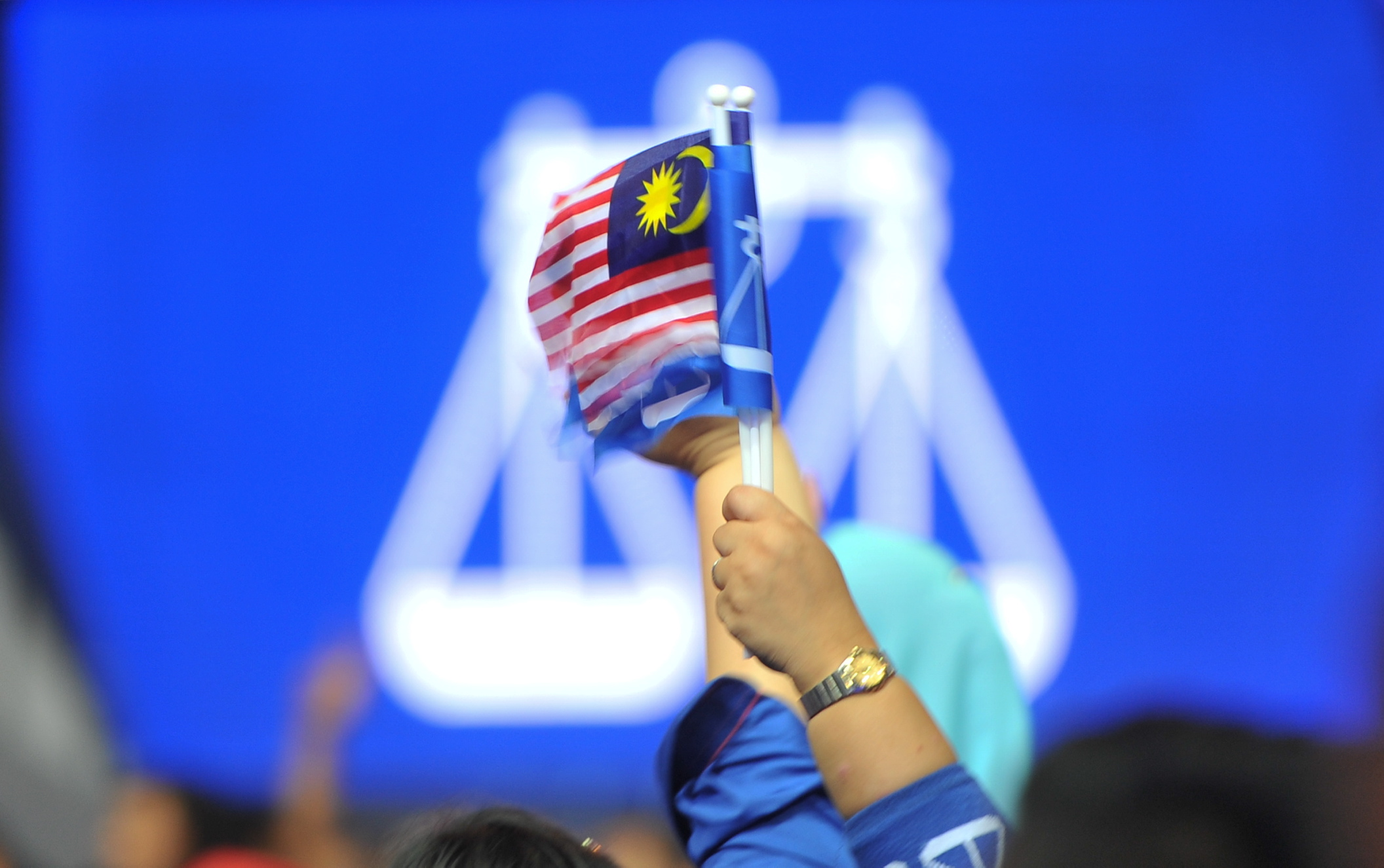
The Barisan Nasional coalition, and its predecessor Alliance, ruled Malaysia from independence until 2018, and held a two-thirds majority in parliament for much of this period.

The UMNO-dominated Alliance coalition, later renamed later the Barisan Nasional (BN), controlled the national government from independence until 2018. In particular, control of government gradually consolidated under UMNO party leadership and the Prime Minister's Department (PMD). The continuous rule of BN shifted power towards the central government. Party loyalists were appointed to federal and state positions. Institutional checks, such as the veto power of the Senate, were weakened. New national laws and institutions circumvented the formal powers of the states. This control could allow for quite granular interventions: the Commercial Vehicles Licensing Board, for example, can be used by the federal government to manage local-level bus routes. The National Council for Local Government was created in 1960, formalising federal influence at the local level. Local council elections were suspended in 1965. In 1964, the Senate was expanded to include 32 appointees of the central government, increasing from 22. This meant that central government appointees outnumbered senators appointed by states (two from each state).

Following independence, two main opposition groups emerged. The Malaysian Islamic Party (PAS) gained support in the northeast, especially in Kelantan and Terengganu, while non-Malay opposition parties gained support in parts of the west coast. PAS won in Kelantan and Terengganu in 1959, although in 1961 defections in the Terengganu parliament gave control to UMNO. The national government arrested some PAS leaders, charging them with supporting Indonesia in the Konfrontasi. However, BN was still unable to win Kelantan in the 1964 or 1969 elections. The popularity of PAS was seen as a rejection by Malay voters of the racial compromises made by Alliance, while at the same time Alliance faced growing opposition in non-Malay constituencies. The 1969 Malaysian general election also saw UMNO lose Penang to Parti Gerakan Rakyat Malaysia, and hung parliaments emerged in Perak and Selangor. While PAS did not win another state, it won almost 24% of the popular vote nationally. These disruptive political results were followed by race riots. In response, the national government suspended the constitution and parliament. While emergency rule was ended after 20 months, BN gained a consistent two-thirds parliamentary majority afterwards. Gerakan, PAS, and other opposition parties made agreements with UMNO, and Alliance was reformed into the broader Barisan Nasional (BN). The constitution was amended to remove control of electoral constituencies, including the number allocated to each state, from the Electoral Commission. Instead, it became determined by the constitution, and thus could be amended by BN through their parliamentary supermajority. The relative allocation of seats within Peninsular Malaysia remained roughly proportional to population, although Malay-majority states received a slight advantage.

Control over the economy was centralised through the 1971 New Economic Policy. The Petroleum Development Act 1974 shifted control of oil and natural gas production in Sabah, Sarawak, and Teregganu to the national government, with states instead receiving 5% of the national government's profit. The Local Government Act 1976 conferred some powers over local government to the national government. That year also saw the national constitution amended to symbolically list Sabah and Sarawak as equivalent to the other states. State Economic Development Corporations became effectively controlled by the federal government in the mid-1970s, despite being initially established by states. Privitisation efforts in the 1980s and 1990s saw control of public services removed from states in favour of private companies. The central government imposed bureaucratic barriers to give it control over some state decisions, and withheld funding from state governments that disagreed with it, such as halting general subsidies to Kelantan during periods when it was governed by the opposition, and halting oil proceeds to Terengganu in a similar situation.

The constitution was amended to make tourism a federal responsibility in 1994 without consulting the states, although in practice states still promote their own tourism. It was also amended to make water management a concurrent responsibility rather than a state one in 2006. Over time, the Senate has slowly become more dominated by appointments by the central government, reducing the power of those appointed by states. National government control of Islam has also grown. The creation of Malaysia Economic Corridors, which operate under the PMD, brought three quarters of land under a parallel structure of government control to that of the states.

The proportion of revenue that went to the national government became even more lopsided, increasing from 80.5% after the formation of Malaysia to 90.7% in the late 2000s. The national government began to fund states more through loans than through grants. With state funding dependent not only on their own revenue but on federal government favour, there was unequal development, with the public sector growing in some states and decreasing in others. Relative to GDP, the public sector was consistently small in Sabah and Sarawak. Kedah saw relatively high growth in the late 20th century, coinciding with the long rule of Prime Minister Mahathir Mohamad, who was from that state.

Due to the many mechanisms of federal control, state governments were heavily influenced by the national government, reducing the theoretical impact of the federal system. The national government was effectively able to select the Chief Ministers of each state. Until 2008, UMNO also led almost all of the state governments, never losing control of more than 2 at a time. In Sabah and Sarawak, local parties often aligned themselves with BN, and the central government intervened to shape the development of the politics of its new states. The expulsion of Singapore from Malaysia in 1965 was an early example of central government power. The Chief Ministers of Sabah and Sarawak, Fuad Stephens and Stephen Kalong Ningkan respectively, were not consulted on the expulsion. In 1966, the federal government engineered the removal of Stephen Kalong Ningkan as Chief Minister of Sarawak, eventually declaring a state of emergency to resolve the constitutional crisis that had emerged in its favour. Both the federal and Sarawak constitutions were amended to enable the dismissals of chief ministers. In 1970, an UMNO-friendly government was elected in Sarawak.

The autonomy of Sabah and Sarawak gradually diminished in practice, despite the assurances of the Malaysia Agreement, although their indigenous populations were granted bumiputera status in 1971. Upon the formation of Malaysia, the constitution was changed to list the new states separately from the existing ones, however a later amendment combined this into one list. The federal government facilitated the spread of Islam in the new states, and it became the official religion of Sabah in 1973. The civil service in Sabah and Sarawak is dominated by individuals from West Malaysia, and both states received only 5% of the royalties derived from natural resource exploitation in their territory. The national Electoral Commission controlled state constituency boundaries. The independence of East Pakistan led to the use of "Peninsular Malaysia" becoming officially preferred to "West Malaysia", and "Sabah and Sarawak" replacing "East Malaysia", to reduce links between the two Bornean states.

Overall, the federal government clashed more with the Sabahan government than the Sarawakian one. Sarawakian politics was heavily influenced by Parti Pesaka Bumiputera Bersatu, an UMNO-aligned party that included large numbers of Malays and other Muslim bumiputera. It and other parties have maintained a stable and dominant coalition that kept on good relations with the federal government while maintaining autonomy. Sabahan politics has been more fractious. Sabah saw Malayisation and Islamisation under Datu Mustapha Datu Harun, but he was removed after seeking greater autonomy. The successor Sabah People's United Front-led government initially continued such policies, but after a breakaway group defeated the original party in 1985, Kadazan-Dusun identity was more heavily promoted. Development grants allocated to both states lessened over time. While they were higher per capita than those given to other states, the relative underdevelopment of those two states has persisted since federation, with a net transfer of wealth away from the two states. The percentage of seats in the national parliament allocated to both states was reduced, although they retained a larger share than their proportion of the population.

In 1993, the constitution was amended to remove full legal immunity from the royalty. To overcome objections from the Conference of Rulers, the central government withdrew all support from the royals that it was legally able to, while undertaking a public relations campaign to damage public perceptions of the royals. The 1997 Asian financial crisis led to the national government to take on further control of public services. Some companies that had taken over utilities from states were nationalised under the federal government. Some that were not became supervised by federal commissions, which lacked state representatives.

After independence, the country's capital city, Kuala Lumpur, grew significantly. At this time, the city was part of Selangor, limiting the ability of the federal government to develop the capital as the federal capital was controlled by a single state. The 1974 Federal Territory of Kuala Lumpur Agreement saw the city separated from Selangor to become a separate territory directly controlled by the federal government. This was partly a response to the a race riot that occurred in the city in 1969. The removal of Kuala Lumpur, with its large ethnic Chinese population, from Selangor secured BN's control of that state. Labuan, a British territory since 1847 that was joined to North Borneo in 1946, was split from Sabah in 1984 to become an offshore financial centre. A third territory, Putrajaya, was split from Selangor in 2001 to serve as the administrative capital. The cession of Labuan was seen as a symbol of decreasing Sabahan autonomy.

==== Opposition-run states ====
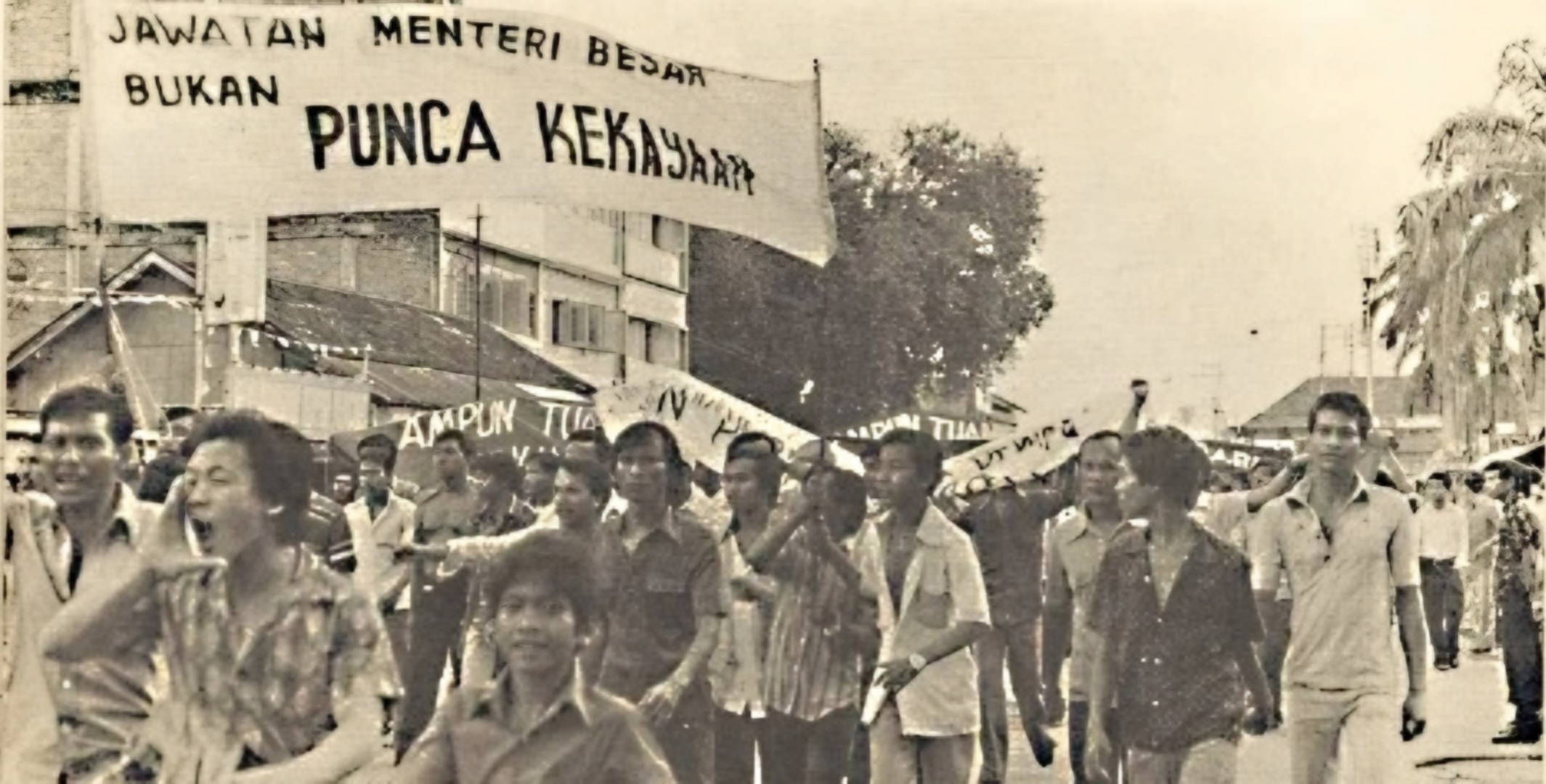
Protestors during the 1977 Kelantan Emergency

Kelantan elected the opposition Malaysian Islamic Party (PAS) in 1959, and they governed until 1978. That year, the chief minister was effectively removed by the federal government. This crisis, precipitated by a split in PAS between those who supported and opposed an alliance with the federal government, led to UMNO expelling PAS from BN. A February 1978 snap election, in which campaigning was banned, saw PAS lose the state to UMNO and its allies, being reduced to two of the 36 seats in the Kelantan parliament. PAS recovered only in 1988, when a member of the Kelantan royal family left UMNO after losing a leadership election, and formed an electoral alliance with PAS which won the state's 1990 election, returning the state to opposition control. In 1991, when two Kelantan lawmakers defected to UMNO, Kelantan amended its constitution to require by-elections following defections. This change would remove the ability of UMNO to entice defectors, which it had done in several states before this point. The amendment was however struck down by the Supreme Court. After the initial PAS victory in Kelantan, the state received fewer grants from the central government, outside of a brief period where PAS joined BN. From 1990, development funding to Kelantan was again reduced, with the state receiving the second-smallest allocation. The federal government also stopped providing oil royalties to the state.

Outside of Kelantan, opposition parties did not see much electoral success. Notable periods of opposition rule occurred in Sabah (1985–1994) and Terengganu (1999–2004). After the United Sabah Party, which governed Sabah at the time, defected from BN in 1990, development funding was shifted to other states. Timber exports, which were a source of state funding, were banned by the federal government in 1992. The central government worked directly with local authorities, bypassing the state government, and encouraged voting for BN as a way to receive investments. In the 1990s some Sabahan politicians calling for autonomy were accused of fostering secession and detained. The 1990s also saw UMNO officially start operating in Sabah. Its activities there sought to undermine local parties, and its Sabahan branch even accepted non-Muslims as party members. After taking control of the state government in 1994 by engineering defections from PBS, UMNO instituted a system of rotating chief ministers, meaning none served a full term. The rise of UMNO ended Sabah's autonomy in practice, and its relations with the national government became similar to those of the Peninsular states. The United Sabah Party rejoined BN in 2002.

In the 1999 Malaysian state elections, PAS took control of Terengganu and increased its electoral influence in Kedah and Pahang. In 2000, the national government shifted petroleum royalties paid by Petronas from Terengganu to the federal government, replacing it with a smaller direct transfer from the federal to state government. Royalties were restored upon the return of UMNO to power in 2004, but in 2015, Petronas ceased all payments to the state government. The tensions created by these changes exacerbated existing inequality, with Kelantan and Terengganu being relatively poor states. The general strength of the Malaysian Islamic Party (PAS) in these northeastern states and their neighbours was a result of both rising political Islam and continued poverty.

=== Revival of federalism ===
Ahead of the 2008 Malaysian general election, the opposition formed the broad Pakatan Rakyat (PR) alliance, united primarily by opposition to BN rather than by ideology. The election saw BN lose its two-thirds majority in the national parliament. Concurrent state elections saw Penang, Perak, Kedah, and Selangor elect opposition governments, while the government of the opposition-led Kelantan increased its majority. The opposition wins in the relatively wealthier west coast states limited the leverage of tools BN had previously used in poorer states. In Perak, the BN induced three state legislators to defect, creating a constitutional crisis when the Sultan then appointed an UMNO-led government. While this was initially reversed by the Malaya High court, it was endorsed by the Court of Appeal.

Nonetheless, continued control of other economically important states provided a new political platform for the opposition, and created a visible alternative to BN rule. The national government responded to the loss of these states by further strengthening central power. The budget of the PMD was expanded, and by 2012 its budget was 10 times larger than the budget of Selangor, and 15 times the budget of Penang. New agencies within the PMD gained increased control over economic planning, with the PMD controlling 25% of economic planning by 2015. The Ministry of Tourism ended cooperation with opposition-led states, and shifted Tourist Action Councils in those states under federal control. Civil servants and workers for federal ministries in opposition-run states were instructed not to attend state government functions, and Village Development and Safety Committees and Residents' Representation Committees began reporting directly to the federal government, as opposed to BN-run states where they reported to state governments. The 2011 Tenth Malaysia Plan dropped all mention of cooperating with the states regarding economic development, contrasting with previous plans. The federally-run State development offices of Penang and Selangor began operating from outside of those states, and stopped sending reports to the state governments. New economic growth corridors were set up, extending federal control over the 76% of the country they covered. In 2014, the federal government softened its longstanding opposition to the introduction of Hudud punishments in Kelantan. This may have been politically influenced, to split the Islamist Malaysian Islamic Party from others in PR, and to shore up support among rural Malays. PR dissolved in 2015.

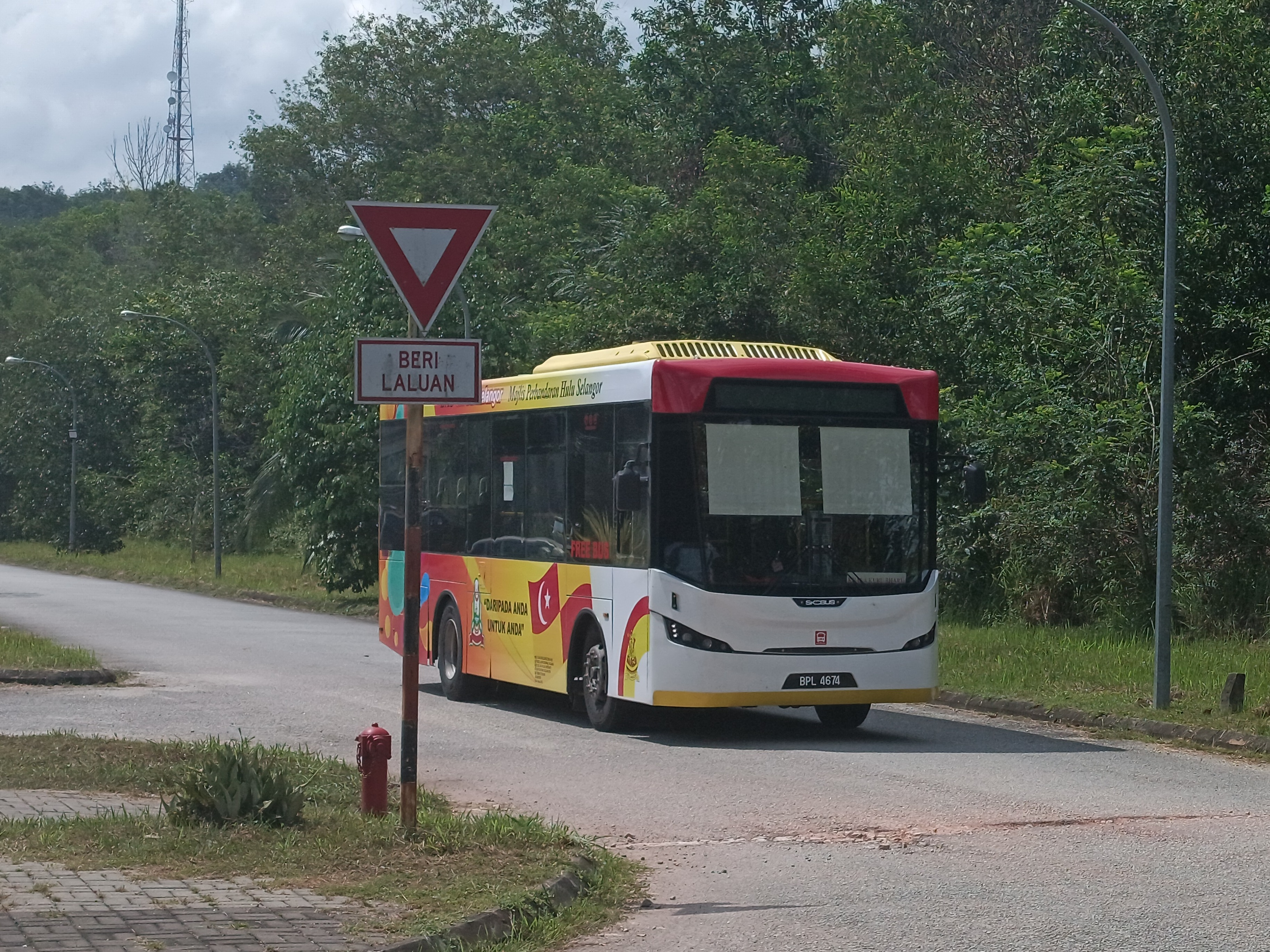
The Smart Selangor Bus initiative, initiated by the opposition-led government of Selangor, inspired the federal government to improve bus services.

Penang and Selangor went on to join Kelantan in becoming opposition strongholds. In 2010, Selangor and Penang appealed to the Electoral Commission for the reinstatement of local elections. This was denied, with the Commission stating that approval was needed from the NCLG. In 2012, Penang tried again to reintroduce local elections, however this was ignored by the Electoral Commission and blocked by the courts. Selangor unsuccessfully tried to regain control of water infrastructure privatised by the previous state government, and both states tried to regain control of waste management. Selangor also sought to amend its constitution to gain control of its civil service, which did not reach the required two-thirds majority required. PR used its ability to dissolve state legislatures to apply pressure on the national election timetable. The persistence of such opposition governments influenced changes in BN rule, such as UMNO's commitment to running more female candidates, imitating the opposition. Efforts by the Selangor government to improve bus services and subsidise housing were imitated by the federal government.

Disputes with the national government also emerged in BN-led states. Oil revenue distribution was raised by Kelantan, Sabah, Sarawak, and Terengganu. Sarawak used its importance to the small BN majority in parliament to extract concessions from Petronas, and set up its own oil company. It also maintained English as an official language after the language's transitional status ended in Peninsular Malaysia, explicitly declared this in 2015, and sought to increase the percentage of teachers hired locally. In 2016, Mukhriz Mahathir was removed from his position as Chief Minister of Kedah after criticising the Prime Minister, despite Mahathir being an UMNO member. In 2017, the Minister of the Federal Territories proposed converting Penang, Langkawi (part of Kedah), and parts of Malacca into federal territories, a symbolic assertion of national government power. The rise of the opposition, and thus the weakening of BN, also provided political space for the Sultans to reassert their influence. In 2015, the Crown Prince of Johor asserted Johor had the right to secede if its autonomy was infringed upon.

=== End of Barisan Nasional dominance ===
State government changes following the 2018 election
State	Government change (E=election, C=other change)	Coalition in government
Johor	May 2018 (E); March 2020 (C); March 2022 (E)	PH; BN-PN; BN
Kedah	May 2018 (E); February 2020 (C); May 2020 (C); August 2023 (E)	PH; PH-Bersatu; PN-BN; PN
Kelantan	May 2018 (E); March 2020 (C); August 2023 (E)	PAS; PN; PN
Malacca	May 2018 (E); March 2020 (C); November 2021 (E); April 2023 (C)	PH; BN-PN; BN; BN-PH
Negeri Sembilan	May 2018 (E); August 2023 (E)	PH; PH-BN
Pahang	May 2018 (E); November 2022 (E)	BN; BN-PH
Penang	May 2018 (E); August 2023 (E)	PH; PH-BN
Perak	May 2018 (E); March 2020 (C); November 2022 (E)	PH; BN-PN; BN-PH
Perlis	May 2018 (E); November 2022 (E)	BN; PN
Sabah	May 2018 (E); May 2018 (C); September 2020 (E)	BN; Warisan-PH-UPKO; GRS
Sarawak	December 2021 (E)	GPS
Selangor	May 2018 (E); August 2023 (E)	PH; PH-BN
Terengganu	May 2018 (E); March 2020 (C); August 2023 (E)	PAS; PN; PN

The Pakatan Harapan (PH) opposition alliance was formed to contest the 2018 Malaysian general election. Its election manifesto explicitly called for a revival of "the true spirit of federalism", as well as the promise to restore the autonomy of Sabah and Sarawak. The 2018 election saw BN lose power at the national level for the first time, and it further lost power in 8 of the 10 states it governed. State governments entered a period of shifting coalitions and much more complex party politics, and discussions about state power, including the status of Sabah and Sarawak, became active political topics. Sabah returned to opposition control, while in Sarawak the dominant political parties, until that point part of BN, withdrew and established themselves as an independent coalition. The PH government formed a Parliamentary Special Select Committee to discuss Federal–State relations which met until the end of their government.

In conjunction with the celebration of Malaysia Day in 2018 under the new PH government, prime minister Mahathir Mohamad promised the government "will restore the status of equal partners to Sabah and Sarawak". However, the proposed amendment failed to reach the required two-thirds majority (148 votes). While 138 parliamentarians voted in support, 59 abstained. Nevertheless, the Malaysian federal government agreed to review the 1963 Malaysia Agreement to remedy breaches of the treaty with the "Special Cabinet Committee To Review the Malaysia Agreement" and directed a Special Task Force Team (Taskforce MA63) to prepare a final report on the 1963 agreement before 31 August 2019. In 2019 Sarawak took its claim for oil sales tax payments to court. This case was won in 2020, and in 2022 an agreement was also reached for Sabah to receive this sales tax revenue.

The Sheraton Move of February 2020 saw the PH government replaced by the Perikatan Nasional (PN) coalition through a shift in parliamentary alliances. This was followed by similar coalition realignments that changed governments in four states. The resulting instability meant that for the first time outside of Sarawak, state electoral calendars fell out of alignment with national elections. The national committee on Federal-State relations was not re-established by the 2020 government, however discussion continued on the relationship with Sabah and Sarawak. Prime Minister Ismail Sabri Yaakob agreed to increase parliamentary representation for Sabah and Sarawak to 35% (up from 25%), however this did not occur before the next national election. (The combined population of both states was 17.4% of the national population.) The political instability increased the importance of the King and other rulers, as they undertook active roles in resolving political disputes.

On 16 September 2021, two years after the failed attempt to amend the constitution to distinguish Sabah and Sarawak, prime minister Ismail Sabri Yaakob pledged to look into issues relating to Sabah and Sarawak via the Special Council on Malaysia Agreement 1963. Negotiations were chaired by the prime minister, joined by the chief ministers of Sabah and Sarawak, as well as eight federal ministers. On 19 October 2021, Minister in the Prime Minister's Department (Sabah and Sarawak Affairs) Maximus Ongkili announced a Bill to be tabled in the coming Parliament sitting after the Special Council on Malaysia Agreement 1963 agreed to Articles 1(2) and 160(2) of the Federal Constitution to restore Sabah and Sarawak as equal partners to Peninsular Malaysia. The proposed law differed from the 2019 proposal, being tabled by Minister in the Prime Minister's Department (Law and Parliament) Wan Junaidi. The same meeting also saw the council agree to empower both the Sabah and Sarawah governments to issue deep fishing licences, previously issued by the federal government.

Four constitutional amendments were tabled on 3 November 2021: listing the "Borneo States" of Sabah and Sarawak in a separate group to the 11 "states of Malaya", defining Malaysia Day as the day when Sabah and Sarawak joined, defining "Federation" as the formation of Malaysia rather than Malaya, and changes to the inheritance of Sarawak native status. On 14 December 2021, the proposed amendment was passed in the Parliament unanimously with 199 votes in favour, and 21 MPs absent from the 6-hour long debate. The amendments went into effect on 11 February 2022. Shortly after the national constitutional amendments, Sarawak amended its state constitution, renaming its "Chief Minister" a "Premier" to symbolically differentiate the state from those on the peninsula.

On 6 January 2022, Minister Ongkili announced the setting up of a joint technical committee to study Sabah's proposal for increased annual grants in addition to a counteroffer from the Federal Government. This committee met monthly, and in the 2023 budget Sabah was allocated more funding than any other state. While there was some cooperation between Sabah and Sarawak post-2018 towards seeking enhanced autonomy, cooperation has been limited, in part because of Sarawakian parties being unwilling to work too closely with what are seen as federally-influenced Sabahan parties. Both states have been pushing for increased control over their continental shelf, greater representation in the national parliament, and increased revenue collection. Sarawak's bid to obtain MASwings, which is part of an ambition to establish a state airline, was approved by the federal government. However, new state laws asserting state control over oil and gas resources have led to legal disagreements with the federal government, which asserts that ultimate authority resides with Petronas at the national level.

After the 2022 Malaysian general election, the PH and BN coalitions formed a national government, and many PH- or BN-led state governments followed suit by bringing the other coalition into their state administrations. In Johor, the concept of an official opposition was replaced by the idea of a "balancing force", and the PH-affiliated former opposition adopted this role instead of joining the UMNO government. In Terengganu, PN won every seat, leaving the state parliament without an opposition. Many states did not dissolve their assemblies to align with the national election, and in the end only three states (Perlis, Perak, and Pahang) held simultaneous elections. Another impact of the election was the resulting ruling coalition relying on East Malaysian parliamentarians to maintain a majority, increasing the influence gained by both states in the 2018 election. This has been matched by increasing assertiveness by the Sabah and Sarawak governments for greater political and economic power, and increasing political focus within the two states of their unique identities.

Neither BN or PH campaigned on federal issues in general, although both had specific promises for Sabah and Sarawak. Continuing the trend of prior governments, a government body was established to facilitate discussions about Sabah and Sarawak. Through this body it has been agreed, among other things, that gas regulation will come under the control of both states, and that some federal land previously appropriated from the state governments will be returned. The national government also included significant numbers of East Malaysian ministers, including Fadillah Yusof, the first East Malaysian deputy prime minister. The PH-BN government set up a parallel system of village governance, mostly but not entirely in opposition-led states. These often relied on BN appointees from the pre-2018 period. During this administration, Penang, Johor, Terengganu, Sabah, and Sarawak all sought larger fiscal transfers. Oil revenue came under further dispute, with Sabah and Sarawak seeking control of all oil produced from the continental shelf extending from their states. Terengganu has also sought such control, although Terengganu lacks the same legal basis, and its claim was rejected by the federal government. Sarawak has gained some control over its educational system, despite education being constitutionally a federal competency. The Regent of Johor called in June 2024 for his state to be treated as an equal to the federal government. Johor has also sought to retain more tax. Kedah has sought to increase the money it receives from the federal government for the Penang lease payments. One area where the PH-BN administration has given greater grants that previous administrations is Ecological Fiscal Transfers, which are given to states to ensure the conservation of natural forest areas.

Sarawak also gained further control over fisheries, determining who counted as a Sarawak native, and control over natural gas. Further negotiations regarding the powers of Sabah and Sarawak continued in 2025, on topics including the number of seats given to the states in parliament, control over tourism, and control over the state civil services. Sabah has obtained greater control over electric utilities. On 17 October the Kota Kinabalu High court ruled that the national government's former policy of not providing 40% of revenue from Sabah to Sabah was unlawful and unconstitutional, and ordered that an agreement be reached on the lack of such funding from 1974 to 2021. The 29 November 2025 Sabah state election saw all national coalitions lose seats to various Sabah-based regional parties.

== Brunei and Singapore ==
=== Brunei ===
After the Second World War, the United Kingdom sought to integrate Brunei with North Borneo and Sarawak, as an interim step to unifying the Borneo territories with Malaya and Singapore. However, the Sultan of Brunei was reluctant to cede political control or share oil revenues. British authorities continued to envision Brunei as part of the eventual federation of its territories in the region. In March 1956, with the independence of Malaya imminent, the then Sultan of Brunei, Omar Ali Saifuddien III, publicly rejected federation. Brunei's first political party, the Brunei People's Party (PRB), was formed in August 1956 by A. M. Azahari. Azahari had a range of views, but was generally anti-British and did not wish for Brunei to be in a Malayan-dominated federation. While his political party was popular, he had a complicated relationship with the Sultan. When the British rejected proposed moves towards greater autonomy, the Sultan began building political and economic ties with Malaya in 1958.

In 1959, Brunei gained domestic autonomy, and in February 1960, Azahari courted politicians in North Borneo and Sarawak, proposing the idea of the North Borneo Federation. After Tunku Abdul Rahman proposed the Federation of Malaysia in 1961 without consulting Brunei, the PRB leveraged these ties to foster opposition across all three territories. Tunku had difficulties negotiating with Brunei, with poor relationships both with the Sultan and with the PRB. He proposed to British authorities that Brunei be offered part of Sarawak as inducement to join, but British officials vetoed this idea, for Sarawak would never join the federation in that case. While the PRB proposed independence, Malayan authorities assumed the Sultan was in favour of a merger. A joint currency already existed, and the Sultan's sons studied in Malaya. A palace for the Sultan of Brunei was constructed in Kuala Lumpur in preparation for the Federation, to match those of the Malayan sultans.

On 5 December 1961, the Sultan of Brunei made a public statement that spoke positively about the Federation of Malaysia, and Brunei began to participate in meetings of the Malaysian Solidarity Consultative Committee. A January 1962 public inquiry found almost unanimous opposition to the idea of federation in Brunei. The results of this inquiry were suppressed, including in Singapore, where Lee Kuan Yew feared it would shift public opinion there. Despite the results of the inquiry, the Sultan went on to sign a preliminary memorandum at a committee meeting in February. Azahari sought support for his alternative North Borneo Federation proposal in the Legislative Council of Brunei, but was unsuccessful and resigned in April. In June of the same year, the Sultan announced his acceptance of the Federation of Malaysia to the legislative council, subject to the guarantee of Bruneian interests. Azahari began a public campaign of opposition, and PRB won all but one seat in the August election. Azahari courted the support of Indonesia and the Philippines, while the Sultan sought the return of Limbang from Sarawak to generate domestic support for the Federation. In December, political opposition to the union culminated in the Brunei revolt. While the revolt was suppressed with the assistance of the Malayan police and British military forces, it demonstrated wide-ranging opposition in Bruneian society towards the Federation.

Publicly stating he did not support the revolt, the Sultan declared an emergency and suspended the constitution. A new constitution in May strengthened the Sultan's power, and negotiations with Malaya resumed. By June 1963, there were four points of disagreement: oil revenues, financial contributions, oil taxation, and Brunei's expected position at the end of the order of precedence for all Malaysian sultans (due to it being the last to join). Tunku Abdul Rahman issued an ultimatum on these issues during a meeting in Kuala Lumpur; the Sultan rejected the terms, and left the city on 21 June. Following the creation of Malaysia, border posts were established with Brunei in October 1963, and in 1964, Malaysia recalled its officials working in Brunei and shifted teacher training slots allocated to Bruneians to Singapore and the UK. Relations between Brunei and Malaysia began to improve in April 1965, after Brunei backed Malaysia in the North Borneo dispute.

=== Singapore ===
External image
- Map of Malaysia, illustrating the flags and coats of arms of the 14 member states including Singapore. via roots.gov.sg

Singapore was a Malaysian state from the formation of Malaysia on 16 September 1963, until its expulsion from the Federation on 9 August 1965. In the 1962 Singaporean integration referendum, an overwhelming majority chose Option A, which granted Singapore the highest level of autonomy with special status. Singaporeans would also automatically become Malaysian citizens. The constitutional arrangements of the federation were designed to give the island autonomy while limiting the impact of Singapore's Chinese-majority population on national politics. Singapore was given just 15 seats in the national parliament, despite holding 16.9% of Malaysia's population at the time, which, if seats were allocated evenly by population, would have given it 27. This was the converse of Sabah and Sarawak, who received 16 and 24 seats with 4.6% and 7.5% of the population respectively. Singaporeans were not allowed to run for or vote in elections elsewhere in Malaysia. In turn, non-Singaporeans could not run in Singapore. As a state, Singapore had additional autonomy in the areas of education and labour.

Following Singapore's independence, it established a close relationship with Brunei. Malaysia, Brunei, and Singapore had maintained a common currency through the Malayan Currency Board. After Malaysia was formed, its government sought to shift currency control to its new central bank, which was resisted by Brunei. The three states created new currencies beginning in June 1967. Following the split of the currency, Brunei and Singapore have continued to maintain their currencies at par, whereas Malaysia unilaterally broke the peg in May 1973. When Malaysia–Singapore Airlines broke up, Brunei gave preference to Singapore Airlines over Malaysia Airlines. While Malaysia and Singapore joined the Five Power Defence Arrangements in 1971 with Australia, New Zealand, and the United Kingdom, Brunei did not. Malaysia continued to support political opposition in Brunei until the 1970s, receiving support in this from other ASEAN members but not Singapore. However, a change in policy by Malaysia in the late 1970s was part of a process leading to eventual Bruneian independence and membership of ASEAN.

== See also ==
- List of current heads of states and governments of Malaysia
- List of Malaysian states by GDP
- List of Malaysian states by exports
- List of Malaysian states by household income
- List of Malaysian states by salary
- State emblems of Malaysia
- List of districts in Malaysia
- Divisions of Malaysia
