= List of states and federal territories of Malaysia by household income =

This article contains lists of Malaysian states and federal territories by monthly household income, based on the latest survey conducted by Department of Statistics Malaysia in 2024.

As of 30 November 2024, 1 Malaysian ringgit (symbol: RM, currency code: MYR) was equivalent to 0.25 US dollar or 0.20 Euros. In 2024, Malaysia's mean monthly household income stood at RM8,479 (US$1,781). Median monthly household income in Malaysia within the same year was RM6,338 (US$1,331).

== Background ==
The Department of Statistics Malaysia (DOSM) has been conducting the Household Income Survey (HIS) since 1973, and then twice in every five years. Apart from determining the economic well-being of the population in all Malaysian states through this survey, HIS plays a role in collecting information on income distribution patterns of Malaysian households. DOSM highlights that the collection of household income statistics shows a better economic indicator in determining the country's economic policies, rather than individual wages as majority of Malaysians live as households.

== Mean household income map ==
Map of Malaysian states and federal territories by the latest monthly mean household income statistics, as of 2024.

Light Blue	Above national mean
Orange	Below national mean

== Mean monthly household income by state and federal territory ==
State or federal territory	Mean monthly household income (RM)
State or federal territory	2024
Kuala Lumpur	14,795
Putrajaya	13,816
Selangor	12,850
Johor	10,342
Sarawak	8,915
Labuan	8,730
Malaysia	8,479
Penang	8,267
Melaka	8,057
Terengganu	7,248
Negeri Sembilan	6,788
Perak	5,779
Pahang	5,777
Perlis	5,664
Kedah	5,550
Sabah	5,102
Kelantan	3,906
Source: Department of Statistics Malaysia

== Median monthly household income by state and federal territory ==
State or federal territory	Median monthly household income (RM)
State or federal territory	2024
Putrajaya	11,583
Kuala Lumpur	10,742
Selangor	10,128
Labuan	9,170
Johor	8,814
Penang	8,026
Malaysia	6,338
Sarawak	6,307
Melaka	6,122
Terengganu	5,878
Negeri Sembilan	5,226
Perak	4,920
Sabah	4,861
Pahang	4,753
Perlis	4,713
Kedah	4,402
Kelantan	3,195
Source: Department of Statistics Malaysia

== See also ==
- Economy of Malaysia
- Economy of Johor
