= David Allen (botanist) =

Tropical agriculture and UK conservation botanist

David John Allen
- Born: November 1942 (age 83); Guildford
- Education: University of Cambridge
- Spouses: Janet (divorced); Leonora (m. 1992)
- Children: 3
- Parents: Sir William Denis Allen (father); Della Williams (mother)
- Scientific career
- Fields: tropical agriculture; botany; social history
- Doctoral advisors: Alice Evans

David John Allen is a botanist and author, specialising in tropical legumes in Africa and habitat conservation in East Devon, UK.

== Education and personal life ==
He was born in Guildford, UK in 1942. His parents were Della (née Williams) and Denis Allen, a diplomat. In 1946 the family moved to Washington in the USA returning to the UK in 1951. Allen was subsequently sent to boarding school in the UK. He became interested in natural history at a young age.

In 1963 he enrolled at Wye College, University of London. His B.Sc. degree in horticulture included a year at the University Botanic Garden in Cambridge. He subsequently took a M.Sc. at Exeter University in Plant Pathology, including a project with S. A. J. Tarr, followed later by a Ph.D. at University of Cambridge supervised by Alice Evans about genetic resistance to rust disease in the common bean.

== Botanical career ==
Allen had a career in tropical agriculture for over 20 years, concentrating on plant health and yield in legumes. From 1969 he was employed for 2 years at the government Sisal Research Station near Tanga, Tanzania. He left to study for a doctorate and to change direction to legume crops, dividing his time between Cambridge in the UK and Bunda College of Agriculture in Malawi. He then continued research at the International Institute of Tropical Agriculture in Nigeria before returning to Cambridge. This resulted in a book about tropical legumes, focusing on crop improvements and disease resistance. Allen subsequently led a national programme of research on legumes in Zambia until in 1984 he moved to a post in northern Tanzania organised through the International Center for Tropical Agriculture in Cali, Colombia.

In 1993 Allen returned permanently to the UK. He continued to visit East Africa and led tours there and to the Galapagos. However, his focus changed direction to local ecology and conservation around where he lived in East Devon. He became an active member of several local natural history organisations. Allen was a UK national expert on the genus Rubus. He was involved in management and maintenance of the Blackdown Hills Area of Outstanding Natural Beauty, including as a member of the management group until 2015. This included an area of turbary where management was changed to increase its wildlife value.

David J. Allen should not be confused with David Elliston Allen (1932–2023), who was the president from 1985 to 1987 of the Botanical Society of the British Isles (renamed in 2013 the Botanical Society of Britain and Ireland).

== Awards ==
In 2016 David J. Allen was given an award at the National Association for Areas of Outstanding Natural Beauty Landscapes for Life Conference 2016.

== Publications ==
His books include:

- David J. Allen (2008) A Travellers Guide to the Wildflowers and Common Trees of East Africa Camerapix Publishers International LCCN 2011-342383 ISBN 9781904722281
- David J. Allen (2000) Wild flowers of the East Devon coast Quantock Nature, 90 pages. ISBN 9780953768806
- David J. Allen and Jillian M. Lenné (eds) (1997) The Pathology of Food and Pasture Legumes CABI Publishing, 768 pages. ISBN 978-0851991665
- D.J. Allen (1983) The Pathology of Tropical Food Legumes John Wiley and Sons, Chichester, England.
