= David Allen (baseball) =

American baseball player (1858–1931)

- First baseman
- Born: February 15, 1858; Madison, Virginia, U.S.
- Died: October 21, 1931 (aged 73); Pittsburgh, Pennsylvania, U.S.

Negro league baseball debut
- 1887, for the Pittsburgh Keystones

Last appearance
- 1887, for the Pittsburgh Keystones

Teams
- Pittsburgh Keystones (1887)

David Allen (February 15, 1858 – October 21, 1931) was an American Negro league first baseman in the 1880s.

A native of Madison, Virginia, Allen played for the Pittsburgh Keystones in 1887. In seven recorded games, he posted ten hits in 35 plate appearances. Allen died in Pittsburgh, Pennsylvania in 1931 at the age of 73.
