= Denis Allen (diplomat) =

British diplomat

Sir William Denis Allen, GCMG, CB (24 December 1910 – 20 May 1987) was a New Zealand-born British diplomat. His father taught at Whanganui Collegiate School. Allen came to the UK to study for a degree at the University of Cambridge. He entered the UK Diplomatic Service, and his first posting was to the British Embassy in China, accompanied by his wife Della (née Williams). They managed to return to the UK ahead of the Japanese army in the early years of the Second World War. Allen then worked in the Foreign Office in London and in 1946 was posted to the British Embassy in Washington in the USA with his family, returning to the UK in 1951 to continue diplomatic work in London. Their son is the botanist David Allen.

He was knighted in the 1950s. In 1959 he served as United Kingdom Commissioner for Singapore and was subsequently British ambassador to Turkey, and Deputy Under-Secretary of State, Foreign Office.

In January 1960, as the Deputy Commissioner-General for Southeast Asia, Allen held a meeting in Singapore to discuss the "grand design" of the potential federation of some or all of the British territories in Southeast Asia: Brunei, Malaya, North Borneo, Sarawak, and Singapore. While it was thought that the people of North Borneo and Sarawak would resist a potential replacement of British officials with ethnic Malay or Chinese ones, Brunei was viewed as more Malay-leaning and thus a potential offset to Singapore's ethnic Chinese population. Potential configurations considered following this discussion were a union of just North Borneo and Sarawak, a union of all three Bornean territories, a union of Malaya and Brunei, and a wider union of all five territories.
