= Department of Statistics Malaysia =

Malaysian government agency

- Jabatan Perangkaan Malaysia جابتن ڤراڠكأن مليسيا
- Coat of arms of Malaysia

Agency overview
- Formed: 1949; 77 years ago
- Preceding agency: Bureau of Statistics
- Jurisdiction: Government of Malaysia
- Headquarters: Block C6, Complex C, Federal Government Administrative Centre, 62514 Putrajaya, Malaysia.
- Employees: 3,190 (2020)
- Annual budget: MYR 193,488,000
- Agency executive: Mohd Uzir Mahidin, Chief Statistician
- Parent ministry: Ministry of Economy
- Key document: Statistics Act 1965
- Website: dosm.gov.my

The Department of Statistics Malaysia (DOSM; Malay: Jabatan Perangkaan Malaysia) is a government agency in Malaysia that operates under the Ministry of Economy. It is responsible for the collection and interpretation of reliable statistics related to the economy, population, society and environment of Malaysia which the government primarily uses to assess, review and implement national public policies.

DOSM data are publicly accessible on the OpenDOSM website.

== Responsibilities and activities ==
=== MyCensus ===
The department conducts the Population and housing census of Malaysia (MyCensus) every 10 years. As of the most recent census in 2020, DOSM had implemented 5 censuses since the establishment of Malaysia.

=== Economic statistics ===
The department supplies a wide variety of financial information. Through its various divisions, the department is responsible for the production and compilation of national accounts such as quarterly and annual gross domestic product (GDP), national income, consumption, savings, balance of payments (BOP). Other economic statistics such as services statistics, the balance of payments, economic indicators, international trade statistics, industrial production and construction statistics as also frequently compiled by the department.

== History ==
=== Establishment ===
The DOSM was established in 1949 under the Statistics Ordinance 1949. It was then known as the Bureau of Statistics and mainly produced statistics related to external trade and estate agriculture

In 1965, the Bureau of Statistics was renamed to its current name as provisioned by the Statistics Act 1965. The department's function and role had also been expanded to include data on the economy and society. Under the act, the Sabah and Sarawak statistics office became a branch of the DOSM. The establishment of state offices in Peninsular Malaysia was done in stages from 1971 to 1982.
