= Responses to the COVID-19 pandemic in February 2021 =

Aspect of viral disease pandemic

This article documents the chronology of the response to the COVID-19 pandemic in February 2021, which originated in Wuhan, China in December 2019. Some developments may become known or fully understood only in retrospect. Reporting on this pandemic began in December 2019.

== Reactions and measures in Africa ==
=== 8 February ===
- South Africa suspends the use of the Oxford–AstraZeneca COVID-19 vaccine following a trial that it did not have an effect on South African variants of the virus.

== Reactions and measures in the Americas ==
=== 11 February ===
- Ontario Minister of Education Stephen Lecce announced that the province will postpone its March break from 15 March to 19 March 2021, to 12 April to 16 April 2021.

=== 24 February ===
- On 24 February the City of Toronto extended the cancellation of event permits and festival until July 1st.
- On 24 February Fry's would be closed all stores immediately to a difficult ever-changing retail environment for 35/36 years.

== Reactions and measures in South, Southeast and East Asia ==
=== 1 February ===
- The Malaysian state of Selangor's "State Investment, Industry and Commerce, and Small and Medium Entreprises" (SMEs) chairman Teng Chang Khim has announced that the state's Chinese New Year celebration will be held online via social media.
- Malaysian Director-General of Health Noor Hisham Abdullah has announced that Malaysia will receive its first batch of the Pfizer–BioNTech COVID-19 vaccine on 26 February 2021, which will be distributed nationwide over a period of two weeks.

=== 4 February ===
- Malaysian Senior Minister Ismail Sabri Yaakob announced that three business activities night markets, hair salons, and car wash services would be allowed to operate under the country’s movement control order from 5 February onwards.
- Malaysian Senior Minister Ismail Sabri Yaakob announced that Chinese New Year family reunion dinners would only be allowed at their residences among family members from the same household. These "standard operating procedures" were criticised by several politicians and public figures including Deputy national unity minister Ti Lian Ker and Member of Parliament Ong Kian Ming as "culturally tone-deaf and unnecessary."

=== 5 February ===
- The Malaysian National Unity Ministry has revised standard operating procedures (SOPs) to allow Chinese New Year family reunions of 15 family members living within a 10km radius that did not involve inter-state or inter-district travel.

=== 7 February ===
- Malaysian Senior Minister (Security) Ismail Sabri Yaakob confirmed that 312,363 foreign workers had been screened for COVID-19 since 1 December last year. Of those screened, 6,093 tested positive for COVID-19 while 306,530 tested negative. This screening involved 13,533 employers and 1,268 clinics.

=== 10 February ===
- The Malaysian Government has allowed retail businesses to resume operations, ending a 28 day restriction on business operations under the Malaysian movement control order.

=== 11 February ===
- The Malaysian Cabinet has confirmed that COVID-19 vaccines would be distributed freely to both Malaysians and foreigners residing in Malaysia. However, Malaysian nationals will receive priority.
- Malaysian Senior Minister Ismail Sabri Yaakob confirmed that gym activities, golf, table tennis, badminton and tennis would be allowed from 12 February.

=== 13 February ===
- The Malaysian National Unity Ministry confirmed that non-Muslim places of worship would be allowed to start reopening from 12 February for the remainder of the Malaysian movement control order, which is scheduled to end on 18 February.

=== 15 February ===
- Tokyo local government officials said that COVID-19 cases in Tokyo were underreported by 838 between 18 November 2020 and 31 January 2021. They said that an increased workload resulted in the error: the local government's health department was understaffed

given the fact that the number of COVID cases were surging and new daily cases hit a record high on 7 January 2021.

=== 16 February ===
- Malaysian Senior Minister Ismail Sabri Yaakob extended the Movement Control Order for Selangor, Johor, Penang and Kuala Lumpur. Meanwhile, Kedah, Perak, Negri Sembilan, Terengganu, Kelantan, Melaka, Pahang and Sabah as well as the federal territories of Putrajaya and Labuan entered into the less restrictive Conditional Movement Control Order (CMCO).

=== 17 February ===
- The Indonesian Government has announced that it would make COVID-19 vaccination compulsory for citizens and will seek the private sector's help in inoculating the population.

=== 20 February ===
- Malaysian Education Minister Mohd Radzi Md Jidin has announced that school pupils will be returning to school in stages between 1 March and 4 April. Primary school students will return to class in staggered phases on 1 and 8 March. Secondary school pupils in will return between 4 and 5 April.

=== 25 February ===
- Malaysian Senior Minister Ismail Sabri Yaakob announced that the meetings, incentives, conferencing and exhibitions (MICE) sector in states under the Malaysian movement control order would be allowed to resume from 5 March.

== Reactions and measures in the Western Pacific ==
=== 3 February ===
- New Zealand Prime Minister Ardern has provisionally approved the use of the Pfizer-BioNTech COVID-19 vaccine in New Zealand. The initial batches of the vaccine are scheduled to arrive in late March 2021, with frontline workers and the vulnerable being given priority.

=== 5 February ===
- Immigration New Zealand has confirmed that New Zealand's refugee resettlement programme, which had been suspended in 2020 as a result of the COVID-19 pandemic, would resume. The Government intends to resettle 210 refugees by 30 June 2021, with refugees undergoing the mandatory two-week stay in managed isolation.

=== 8 February ===
- The New Zealand Government announced the launch of the "Short-Term Absence Payment" (STAP) initiative which comes into effect the following day. STAP allows self-isolating employees to receive a lump sum of NZ$350 from their employers if they are unable to work from home.

=== 10 February ===
- The New Zealand Government has formally authorised the Pfizer-BioNTech COVID-19 vaccine for use in New Zealand. The vaccine will be limited to people over the age of 16 years.

=== 11 February ===
- Victorian Premier Daniel Andrews has announced that the Australian state of Victoria will go into a five-day lockdown from 11:59 pm local time in response to an outbreak at the Holiday Inn that has claimed 13 cases. This is the city's third lockdown since the start of the pandemic and comes in response to community transmission of the Lineage B.1.1.7 UK variant.

=== 14 February ===
- New Zealand Prime Minister Jacinda Ardern Ardern announced that Auckland will enter an Alert Level 3 lockdown from 11:59pm that night for a period of three days. The rest of New Zealand will move into a Alert Level 2 lockdown for the same time period. The three-day lockdown is meant for the Government to get more information about a new community outbreak in Papatoetoe, South Auckland. Under the Level 3 lockdown, people will be encouraged to work from home and limits will be imposed on public gatherings and travel from Auckland. Schools and daycare centers will be open to the children of essential workers. Under Level 2, gatherings are restricted to 100 people and travel to Auckland is restricted.

=== 17 February ===
- New Zealand Prime Minister Jacinda Ardern announced that Auckland's Alert Level 3 lockdown would be downgraded to an Alert Level 2 since testing indicated minimal risk of widespread transmission. In addition, the rest of New Zealand would move back into an Alert Level 1 lockdown where only border restrictions will remain.

=== 19 February ===
- In New Zealand, 100 nurses were the first people in the country to receive the Pfizer–BioNTech COVID-19 vaccine. Healthcare workers, essential workers and those most at risk will be vaccinated in the second quarter of the year. The general population will be vaccinated in the second half of the year.

=== 22 February ===
- New Zealand Prime Minister Jacinda Ardern has announced that Auckland's lockdown level would be lowered to Level 1 at midnight. However, it will still be compulsory to wear face masks on public transportation throughout the country.

=== 24 February ===
- The Australian state of Queensland, New South Wales and Victoria have suspended their travel bubble arrangements with New Zealand in response to a recent community outbreak in South Auckland. As a result, New Zealanders traveling to these states have to undergo quarantine.

=== 27 February ===
- New Zealand Prime Minister Jacinda Ardern has announced that Auckland will enter into an Alert Level 3 lockdown for the next seven days after a new community transmission was detected. In addition, the rest of the country will go into an Alert Level 2 lockdown.

== See also ==
- Timeline of the COVID-19 pandemic
