= Taman Taynton View =

- Township
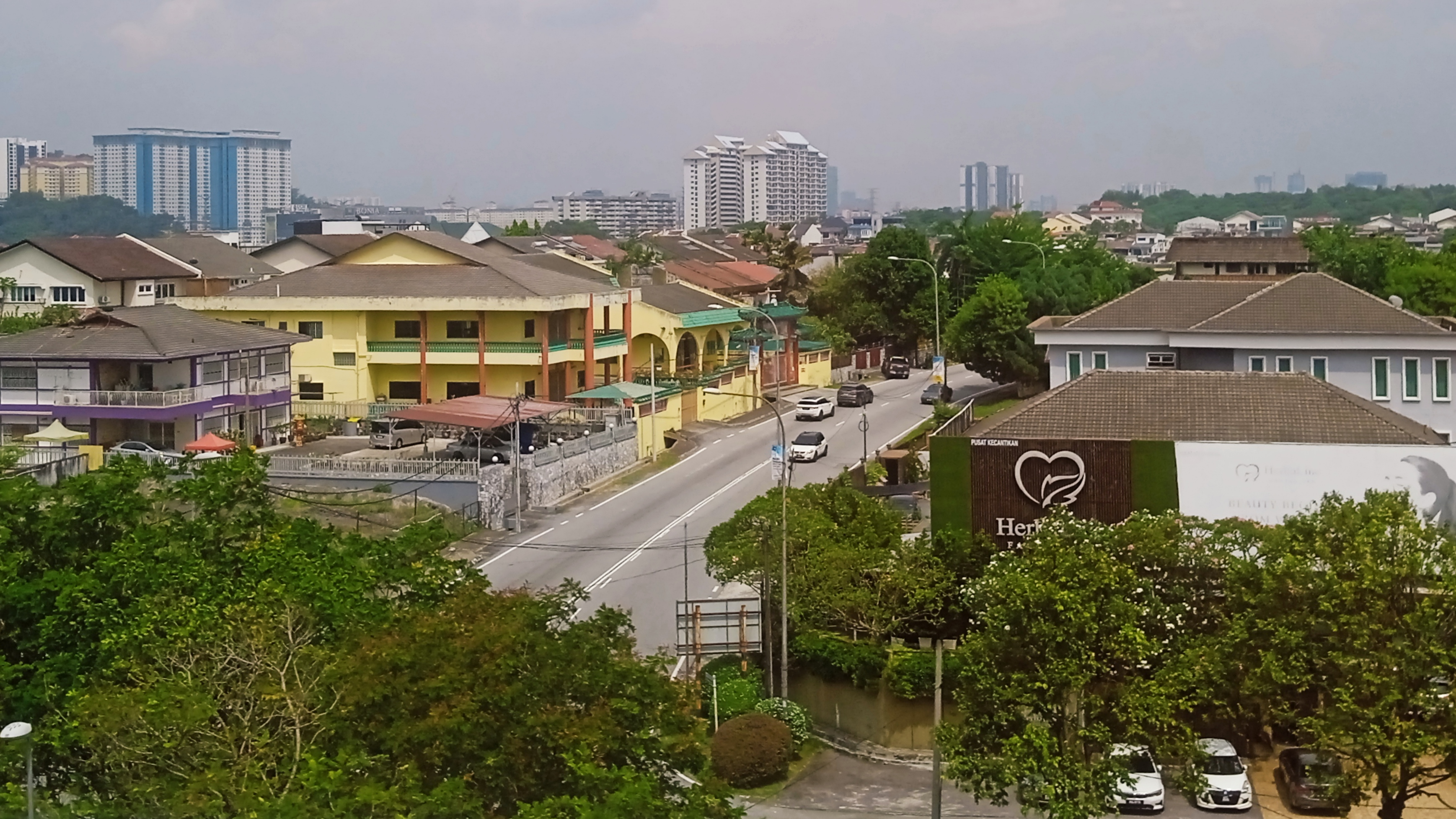
- Country: Malaysia
- State: Federal Territory of Kuala Lumpur
- Constituency: Cheras

Government
  - Local Authority: Dewan Bandaraya Kuala Lumpur
  - Mayor: Kamarulzaman Mat Salleh
- Time zone: UTC+8 (MST)
- Postcode: 56000
- Dialling code: +603

Taynton View is the first residential hub in Cheras, Kuala Lumpur, Malaysia. The former Taynton Rubber Estate was developed back in 1967 as a residential estate by N. Kamala Devi, a lawyer-cum-developer.

== Roads ==
N. Kamala Devi named the roads after family members and friends. There are:-

- Jalan Nadchatiram (N. Kamala Devi's father)
- Jalan Dato' Haji Harun (N. Kamala Devi's long time friend)
- Jalan Bee Eng (N. Kamala Devi's secretary)
- Jalan Arasakesari
- Jalan Choo Lip Kung
- Jalan Lawrence Law
- Jalan Goh Boon Hong
- Jalan Tham Loy
- Jalan Dhana Pakia Devi (N. Kamala Devi's sister)
