= Malaysian movement control order =

COVID-19-related measures, 2020–2021

Malaysia Movement Control Order
- Part of the COVID-19 pandemic in Malaysia
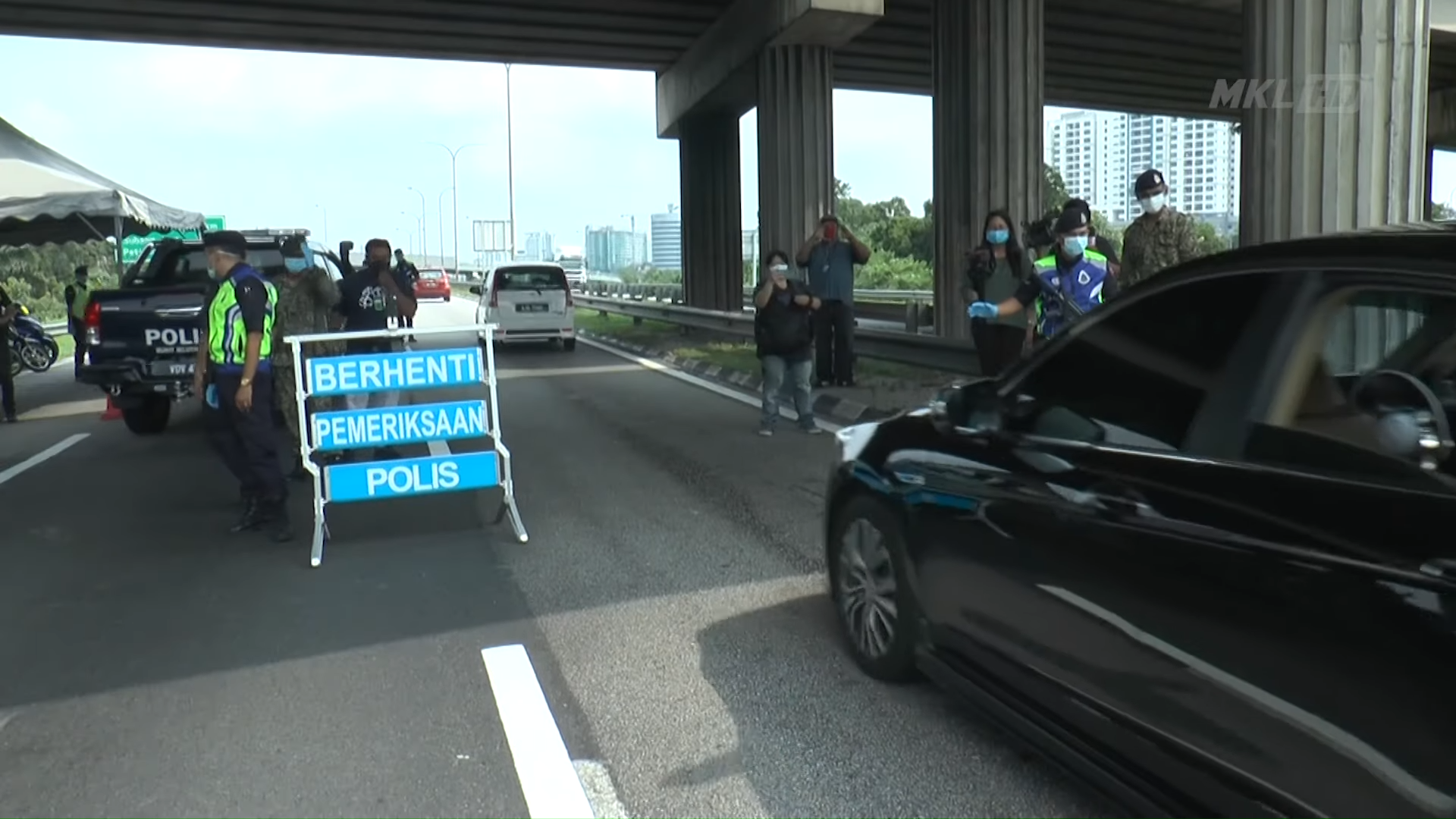
- Police checkpoint in Shah Alam, 22 March 2020
- Date: 18 March 2020 – 31 December 2021 (1 year, 9 months, 1 week and 6 days)
- Location: Malaysia
- Caused by: COVID-19 pandemic in Malaysia
- Goals: Containment of the pandemic
- Methods: Prohibition of movement and mass assembly nationwide, including all religious, sports, social and cultural activities.; All religious activities in mosques suspended, including Friday prayers; Malaysians barred from leaving the country, and restrictions placed on the entry of non-Malaysians into the country; All industries local or federal are closed except for infrastructure services and supermarkets, wet markets, grocery stores and multi-functional stores selling daily necessities; All nurseries, government and private schools, including boarding schools, international schools, tahfiz centres, primary, secondary and pre-university education institutions, public and private universities, and vocational training centres closed
- Status: Completely lifted
- Result: Restrictions towards Malaysians in Malaysia

Casualties
- Arrested: 24,081 (As of 3 May 2020)

The Movement Control Order (Malay: Perintah Kawalan Pergerakan Kerajaan Malaysia), commonly referred to as the MCO or PKP, was a series of national quarantine and cordon sanitaire measures implemented by the federal government of Malaysia in response to the COVID-19 pandemic. The orders were commonly referred to in local and international media as "lockdowns".

Beginning on 18 March 2020, the MCO was enforced nationwide and encompassed restrictions on movement, assembly and international travel, and mandated the closure of business, industry, government and educational institutions to curb the spread of SARS-CoV-2, the virus that causes COVID-19. These measures were periodically relaxed and strengthened throughout the following 19 months in response to the changing epidemiology of the disease. Movement control orders were also localised to specific states and federal territories or smaller areas. The Movement Control Order was included in the National Recovery Plan (Malay: Pelan Pemulihan Negara, shortened to NRP/PPN) launched in June 2021.

In October 2021, the Malaysian government lifted movement control restrictions for vaccinated people and announced its intention to treat COVID-19 as an endemic disease.

== Progress timetable by phase ==
Movement Control Order by phase
Phase	Date
Movement Control Order (MCO/PKP, 18 March 2020 – 3 May 2020)
Phase 1	18 March 2020 – 31 March 2020
Phase 2	1 April 2020 – 14 April 2020
Phase 3	15 April 2020 – 28 April 2020
Phase 4	29 April 2020 – 3 May 2020
Conditional Movement Control Order (CMCO/PKPB, 4 May 2020 – 9 June 2020)
Phase 1	4 May 2020 – 12 May 2020
Phase 2	13 May 2020 – 9 June 2020
Recovery Movement Control Order (RMCO/PKPP, 10 June 2020 – 31 March 2021)
Phase 1	10 June 2020 – 31 August 2020
Phase 2	1 September 2020 – 31 December 2020
Phase 3	1 January 2021 – 31 March 2021
MCO by states (13 January 2021 – 31 May 2021)
Each states switch between MCO, CMCO, RMCO, EMCO, and semi-EMCO depending on the COVID-19 condition in each states.
Total lockdown (1 June 2021 – 28 June 2021)
National Recovery Plan (NRP/PPN, 15 June 2021 – 31 December 2021)
Phase 1	1 June 2021 – 1 October 2021
Phase 1 (FMCO)	1 June 2021 – 28 June 2021
Phase 2	5 July 2021 (began early with Perlis, Kelantan, Terengganu, Pahang, and Perak)
Phase 2	7 July 2021 (Penang)
Phase 2	10 July 2021 (Sabah)
Phase 2	14 July 2021 (Sarawak)
Phase 2	26 August 2021 (Negeri Sembilan)
Phase 2	4 September 2021 (Malacca)
Phase 2	10 September 2021 (Selangor, Kuala Lumpur, and Putrajaya)
Phase 2	24 September 2021 (Johor)
Phase 2	1 October 2021 (Kedah)
Phase 2	Period: 5 July 2021 – 18 October 2021 Note: No official announcement was made for Labuan.
Phase 3	4 August 2021 (began early with Perlis, Sarawak and Labuan)
Phase 3	4 September 2021 (Negeri Sembilan)
Phase 3	17 September 2021 (Terengganu)
Phase 3	24 September 2021 (Pahang)
Phase 3	1 October 2021 (Selangor, Kuala Lumpur, Putrajaya, Malacca)
Phase 3	8 October 2021 (Johor)
Phase 3	18 October 2021 (Kelantan, Perak, Penang, Sabah, Kedah)
Phase 3	Period: 4 August 2021 – 3 January 2022
Phase 4	26 August 2021 (began early with Labuan)
Phase 4	24 September 2021 (Negeri Sembilan)
Phase 4	8 October 2021 (Pahang)
Phase 4	18 October 2021 (Kuala Lumpur, Selangor, Putrajaya, Malacca)
Phase 4	25 October 2021 (Johor, Terengganu)
Phase 4	8 November 2021 (Sabah, Perlis, Kedah, Penang, Perak)
Phase 4	3 January 2022 (Sarawak, Kelantan)

== Chronology ==
On 16 March 2020, Prime Minister Muhyiddin Yassin made an official speech and officially promulgated the movement control order under the Prevention and Control of Infectious Diseases Act 1988 and the Police Act 1967. The order included the following restrictions:

1. General prohibition of mass movements and gatherings across the country including religious, sports, social and cultural activities. To enforce this prohibition, all houses of worship and business premises would be closed, except for supermarkets, public markets, grocery stores and convenience stores selling everyday necessities. Specifically for Muslims, the adjournment of all religious activities in mosques including Friday prayers would be in line with the decision made on 15 March 2020 by the Special Muzakarah Meeting of the National Council for Islamic Affairs.
2. Sanctions covering all Malaysians travelling abroad. For those who have just returned from overseas, they would be required to undergo a health check and a 14-day quarantine (or self-quarantine).
3. Restrictions on the entry of all tourists and foreign visitors into the country.
4. Closure of all kindergartens, government and private schools including daily schools, boarding schools, international schools, tahfiz centres and another primary, secondary and pre-university institutions.
5. Closure of all public and private higher education institutions (IPTs) and skills training institutes nationwide.
6. Closure of all government and private premises except those involved in essential services (water, electricity, energy, telecommunications, postal, transportation, irrigation, oil, gas, fuel, lubricants, broadcasting, finance, banking, health, pharmacy, fire, prison, port, airport, safety, defence, cleaning, retail and food supply).

On 18 March, Malaysia began the implementation the movement control order. On 25 March, the prime minister through a live national broadcast announced a first extension of the MCO to last until 14 April.

There were, however, considerations of a further lockdown until late April or May as the number of cases in Malaysia is expected to peak in mid-April, according to the World Health Organization (WHO). On 8 April, Health Director-General Noor Hisham Abdullah said that the health ministry was having a discussion with the nation's cabinet regarding the possible extension of the MCO, with the decision of the MCO's duration to be announced no later than Friday. On 10 April, the prime minister announced a second extension of the MCO by another fortnight until 28 April, noting that his decision was to give space to the healthcare personnels battling the COVID-19 outbreak, apart from preventing the virus from spreading again and to avoid another increase of cases if the MCO is lifted too early. On the night of 23 April, Muhyiddin announced a third extension of the MCO by two weeks till 12 May, with the possibility of further extensions.

The Royal Malaysia Police (PDRM) initially warned that violators of the MCO's regulation may be subjected to various penalties under the Penal Code. However, on 18 March, the chamber of the Attorney General released a federal gazette specific to the control order, where violations can be fined up to RM1,000 (US$229) and/or jailed not more than six months or both. On 14 April, Senior Minister Datuk Seri Ismail Sabri Yaakob stated that compounds will no longer be issued by the police from the next day as the penalties were ineffective on reducing MCO violations, and offenders will be arrested and remanded instead.

Except for travel to Sarawak, a written police permit with a valid reason was originally planned to be required for interstate travel during the MCO. As a result, large crowds were reported to have gathered at police stations for permits hours before the travel restriction was in effect. Concerned that the crowding will exacerbate the spread of COVID-19, PDRM called off the permit plan a few hours before the MCO, until further notice.

During the MCO, PDRM conducted road blocks operations (codenamed "Ops COVID-19") along key points across the country, to monitor travellers and warn them to stay home and abide by the order. From 22 March, Malaysia's military forces were mobilised to augment PDRM's MCO operations; as of April, approximately 7,000 military personnel were deployed to assist. From 4 May, in line with the Conditional MCO, PDRM is planning to reduce roadblocks nationwide to focus on social distancing enforcements as well as curbing the entry of illegal immigrants and smuggling activities.

On 20 March, RapidKL trains had an extended waiting time of 10 minutes, from the previous duration of 3–8 minutes.

On 30 March, the national government designated that all businesses such as supermarkets and restaurants, including food delivery services can only be operated from 8 am till 8 pm starting from 1 April. Sarawak, however, insisted on its operation time of 7 am till 7 pm, citing that Sarawak's daylight is earlier than in West Malaysia. Further measures were instilled starting from 1 April; a person must not be accompanied with other people during travel, a 10 km travel radius for all travellers and the banning of all types of gatherings except for funerals, however the attendees must be kept to a minimum. People who travel for medical purposes are exempted from companion rule and the travel radius.

All levels of supply chains regarding agricultural and fishing industries are allowed to be in operation throughout the order. On 10 April, the Malaysian government gave permissions to certain businesses to operate during the order to ensure the sustainability of the country's economy, to prevent the loss of jobs among Malaysians and to ensure continuous access to basic needs and critical products.

The Malaysian Government had eased lockdown restrictions on 4 May under a "conditional MCO," which allowed certain business sectors to resume operations. On 10 May Prime Minister Muhyiddin announced in a live broadcast, that the CMCO will be extended until 9 June, the fourth extension since 18 March. Muhyiddin Yassin clarified that all rules and standard operating procedures (SOPs) introduced during the conditional MCO would remain in force until 9 June and that any changes to the SOPs or the list of sectors allowed to operate will be announced. There will be a ban on interstate movement during the Hari Raya Aidilfitri, the Kaamatan Feast and Hari Gawai holiday periods.

=== Enhanced Movement Control Order ===
From 27 March 2020, specific locations were subjected to a stay-at-home order, known as the "Enhanced Movement Control Order" (EMCO or Enhanced MCO), for 14 days if a large cluster was detected within the area for the government to conduct a thorough COVID-19 test towards all residents, and to curb the spread of the virus out of the areas. The orders included:

- All residents and visitors within the area are forbidden from exiting their homes during the order;
- non-residents and visitors outside the area cannot enter into the area subjected to the order;
- All businesses are shut down;
- adequate food supplies will be given by the authorities during the 14 day-order to all residents;
- a medical base will be established within the area;
- All roads into the area are blocked.

On 27 March, two areas in Simpang Renggam, Johor were subjected to the order till 9 April as those areas alone contributed to a high 61 positive cases. On 30 March, this order is applied to a few hamlets in Sungai Lui, Hulu Langat District, Selangor due to a detection of a cluster involving a madrasa with 71 positive cases. City One, a residential complex in Jalan Munshi Abdullah, Kuala Lumpur which its residents are mainly foreign workers was subjected to the extended order on 31 March as 17 cases involving residents of the tower were detected. Selangor Mansion and Malayan Mansion, apartment buildings located at Jalan Masjid India, Kuala Lumpur, were subjected to EMCOs on 7 April, as 15 positive cases were detected within the two buildings, while Jalan Masjid India and its surrounding areas were subjected to EMCOs on 14 April. Similarly, an EMCO order was placed for over 15,000 residents living around the Kuala Lumpur Wholesale Market in Selayang on 20 April until 3 May, following the detection of 20 cases and one fatality from the area.

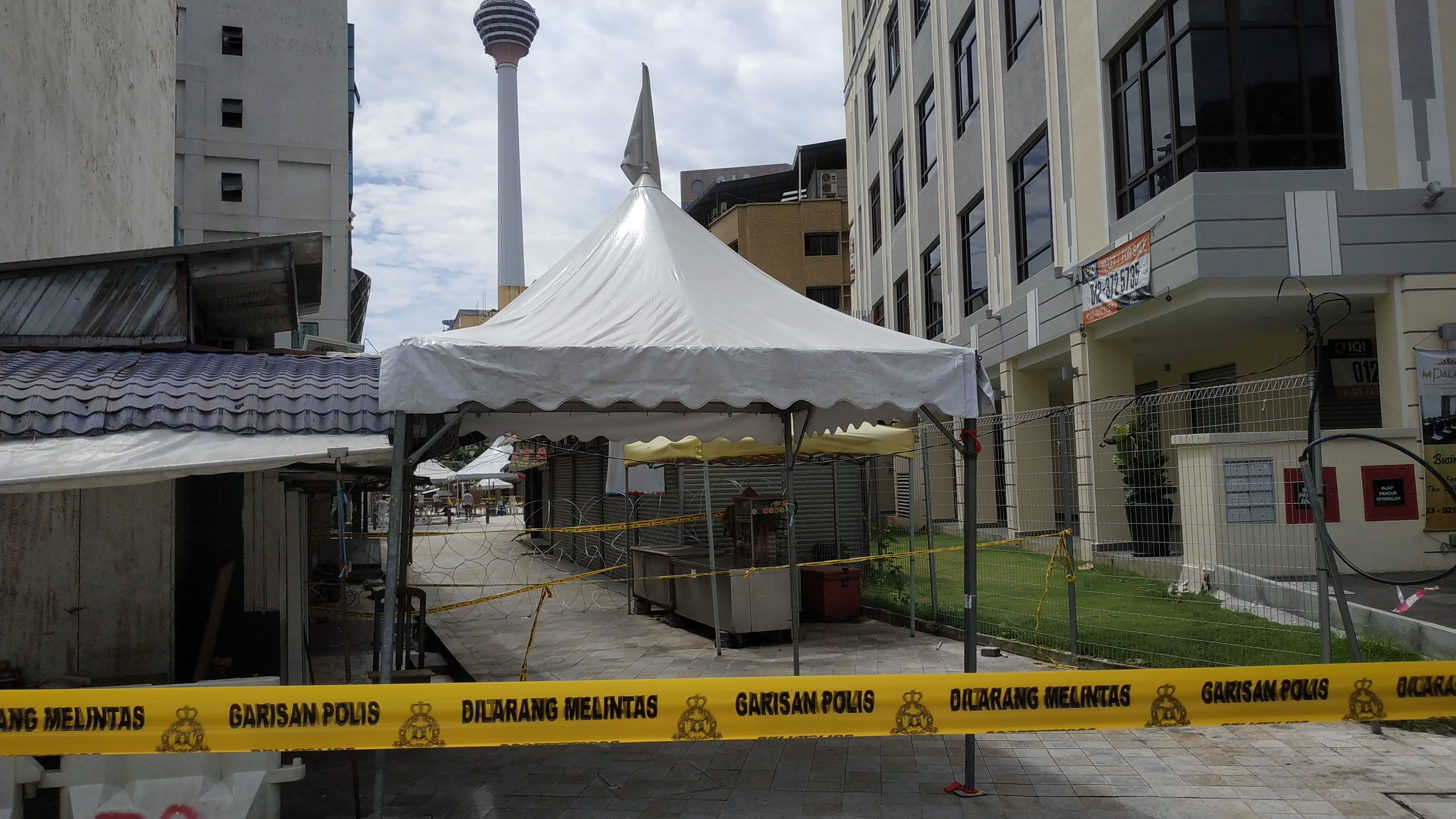
Masjid India of Kuala Lumpur completely sealed off during EMCO

On 6 April, Malaysia's Defence Minister, Datuk Seri Ismail Sabri Yaakob, suggested that the government is planning for a new standard operating procedure regarding the EMCO and the government tried to not impose an excessively wide radius towards areas subjected to the EMCO.

On 9 November, the Government extended the Enhanced Movement Control Order over several areas in Sabah, Selangor, Negeri Sembilan and Sarawak in response to a spike in cases nationwide.

=== Semi Enhanced Movement Control Order ===
From 14 May 2020, Pudu area in Kuala Lumpur comes under semi enhanced movement control order (SEMCO). Soldiers and police put up barbed wire fences at road exits. It is understood that besides Jalan Pudu, the affected roads are Jalan Kancil, Jalan Pasar, Jalan Landak, Lorong Brunei 2 and Lorong Brunei 3. Several busy commercial districts in the Klang Valley have been put under various lockdowns, including the enhanced movement control order (EMCO).

=== Relaxation of restrictions ===
As the number of daily cases and active cases of COVID-19 reduced in Malaysia by mid-April 2020, the government had relaxed several measures of the MCO. Transport Minister Dr Wee Ka Siong confirmed that all public transportation services would resume on 4 May but would abide by social distancing measures. On 30 April, the Government announced that two family members will be allowed to buy food and other daily essentials as part of the relaxation of MCO restrictions.

On 21 June, Senior Minister Ismail Sabri Yaakob announced that couples whose marriage registration had been delayed as a result of the Movement Control Order could not complete the process at all permitted NGOs in the country including clan organisations, temples, churches, and religious bodies.

==== Conditional Movement Control Order (CMCO) ====
Muhyiddin Yassin in his Labour Day speech on 1 May 2020 announced a plan named the Conditional Movement Control Order (CMCO or Conditional MCO), a relaxation of regulations regarding the MCO, with its main goal was to reopen the national economy in a controlled manner. The CMCO was scheduled to start from 4 May. The regulations of the CMCO as stated in his speech included:

- most economic sectors and activities are allowed to operate while observing the business standard operating procedures such as social distancing and recording the names and telephone numbers of customers and the dates of their visit;

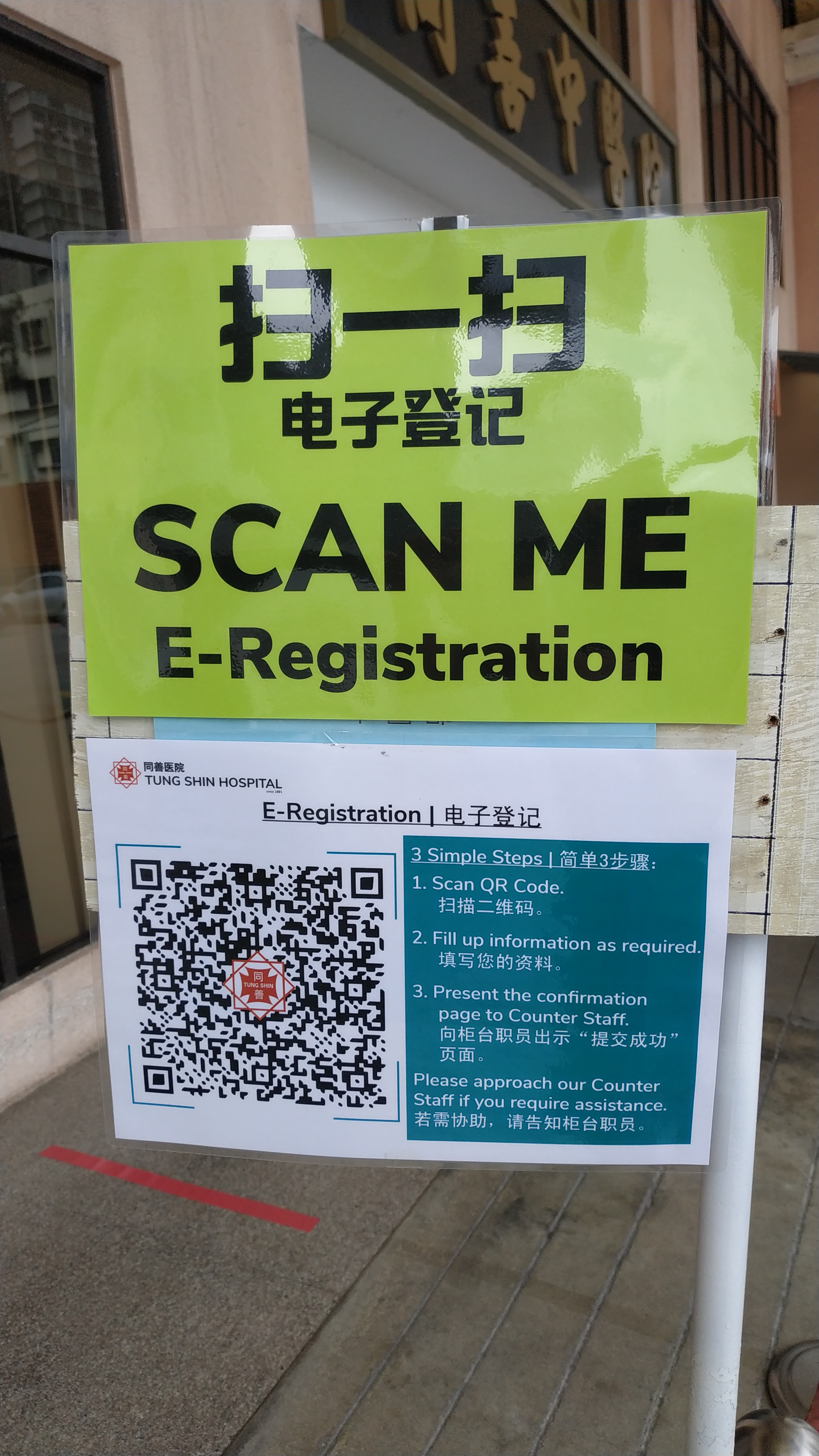
QR Code to be scanned before entering Tung Shin Hospital Kuala Lumpur (Code leads to this online form)

- sports activities involving large gatherings, body contact and other risks of infection are not allowed, including all indoor and stadium sports events. Outdoor sports activities which do not involve body contact, in small groups without an audience and involving not more than 10 persons are allowed on the condition that social distancing is practised;
- social, community and cultural events which involve large gatherings as well as all types of official events and assemblies are not permitted. Religious activities and all congregational or assembly activities in houses of worship are not allowed;
- interstate travel, including the balik kampung tradition for the oncoming Eid al-Fitr is not allowed except for work purposes and to return home after being stranded in the hometowns or elsewhere.

However, the CMCO received mixed reactions among state governments around Malaysia. The states of Kedah, Kelantan, Pahang, Sabah and Sarawak decided to not implement the CMCO by 4 May, either to give way to discussions regarding the implications of reopening economic sections towards the future trend of Malaysia's pandemic or to secure the positive development of the pandemic. The governments of Selangor and Perak restricted some business sectors operating during the CMCO while Negeri Sembilan only allowed economic sectors to reopen. The government of Penang on the other hand had implemented a three-phase gradual reopening till 13 May.

The CMCO received backlash by politicians, health experts and the general public over concerns of a possible resurgence of COVID-19 cases in Malaysia due to the seemingly reckless and unnecessary relaxation of the MCO; the federal government responded by stating that the CMCO is stricter than relaxation measures taken in other countries. By 3 May, over 420,000 members of the public had signed a petition of objection to the conditional MCO and urging the government to stay with the MCO.

On 7 November, Senior Minister Ismail Sabri Yaakob announced that the Malaysian Government would be reinstating the CMCO throughout most of Peninsular Malaysia except Kelantan, Perlis, and Pahang between 9 November and 6 December 2020. Besides, CMCO measures for Sabah, Selangor, Kuala Lumpur, and Putrajaya, which were scheduled to end on 9 November, were extended until 6 December. Under these new CMCO measures, all educational institutions, social and cultural activities will be required to cease but economic activities can continue under set standard operating procedures.

On 13 November, Senior Minister Ismail Sabri Yaakob announced that the Malaysian Government would allow three people from the same household per car, easing an earlier CMCO restriction limiting cars to just two people following a public backlash.

On 20 November, Senior Minister Ismail Sabri Yaakob approved a domestic travel bubble programme within green zones. He also announced the elimination of CMCO restrictions in the states of Johor, Kedah, Malacca, and Terengganu with the exception of certain districts.

On 5 December, Senior Minister Ismail Sabri Yaakob confirmed that the Conditional Movement Control Order would end for most states except Sabah, Kuala Lumpur, most of Selangor, and parts of Johor, Negeri Sembilan, Kelantan and Perak; where the CMCO would be extended until 20 December.

On 7 December, the National Security Council lifted the cap on the number of diners allowed to share tables at restaurants in areas under the Conditional Movement Control Order (CMCO) including Kuala Lumpur.

On 18 December, Senior Minister Ismail Sabri Yaakob extended the CMCO in Kuala Lumpur and much of Selangor with the exception of Sabak Bernam, Hulu Selangor, and Kuala Selangor from 21 December to 31 December 2020. In addition, the CMCO was extended in Sabah and several districts in Negri Sembilan, Johor, Penang, and Perak until 31 December. Meanwhile, the CMCO in certain districts of Kedah and Kelantan will revert to Recovery Movement Control Order on 20 December.

On 28 December, the National Security Council extended the CMCO in Kuala Lumpur and Selangor from 1 January until 14 January in response to a surge in cases and clusters in those areas.

==== Recovery Movement Control Order (RMCO) ====
On 7 June 2020, Prime Minister Muhyiddin Yassin announced that the Conditional Movement Control Order would end on 9 June, with the country entering into the Recovery Movement Control Order (RMCO) phase between 10 June and 31 August. The Prime Minister also announced that interstate travel would be allowed from 10 June under the RMCO except in areas remaining under the Enhanced Movement Control Order (EMCO).

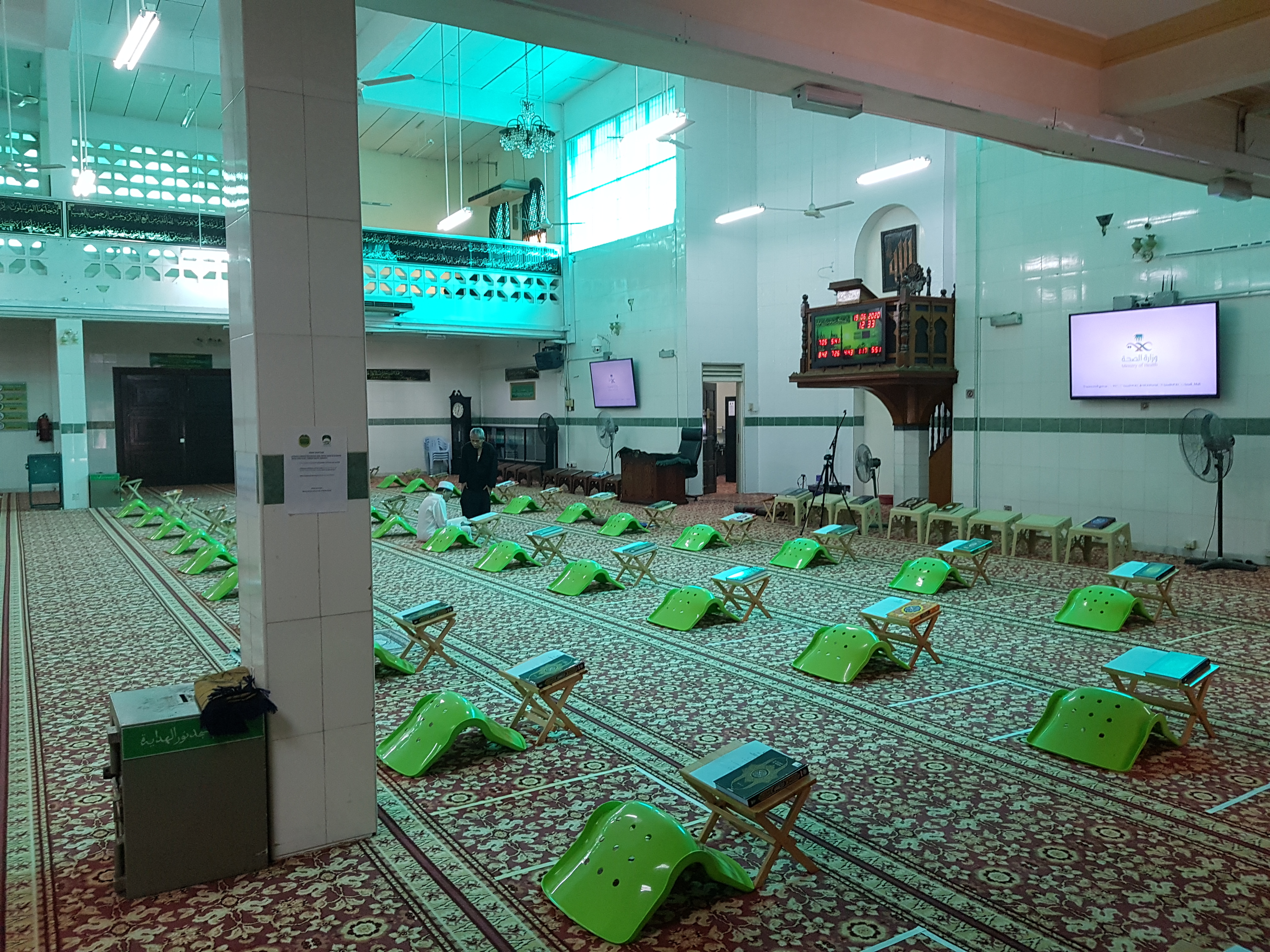
Praying spots for prayer attendees are marked with masking tapes and placed a metre away from each other at the Kampung Pandan Dalam Nurul Hidayah Mosque, Selangor.

In most areas, certain religious activities at mosques are allowed again, but with many restrictions. In Selangor, for example, Muslims are only allowed to go to certain mosques for Friday prayers after receiving an invitation from the mosque authorities, or after having their application accepted by the religious authorities. The number of attendees is also restricted to 40, and then later to 150 people only, as they are instructed to bring their own prayer mats and only sit within their own prepared spaces, distanced a metre away from each other. In Kuala Lumpur, several mosques operated on a 'first-come, first-served' policy.

On 26 June, Senior Minister Ismail Sabri Yaakob announced that sectors under the purview of the Ministry of Tourism, Arts and Culture such as meetings, incentives, conventions and exhibitions, travel and trade fairs, as well as a spa, wellness and reflexology centres would be allowed to open from 1 July. However, tourism businesses are required to abide by social distancing measures, limit crowds to 200–250 people, check customers' temperatures, wear face masks, and provide hand sanitizer. While reflexology centres provided by the blind are allowed to reopen, only Malaysians can work in spas, wellness, and reflexology centres. Ismail Sabri also announced that tuition centres, special education schools and private schools would be allowed to operate soon.

On 29 June, it was reported that both government and private pre-schools, kindergartens, nurseries and daycare centres would resume operations from 1 July. Under the RMCO, a range of businesses and activities have been allowed to resume operations including spas, wellness and foot massage centres, cinemas, meetings, seminars, weddings, birthdays, and religious gatherings. Besides, swimming in public, hotel, condominium, gated community and private pools have also been allowed.

On 3 July, Religious Affairs Minister in the Prime Minister's Department Dr Zulkifli Mohamad Al-Bakri clarified that foreigners would not be allowed to attend congregational prayers at mosques and surau until the department had studied reports from the Federal Territories Islamic Religious Department regarding the situation. Zulkifli expressed hope that the situation would be resolved within a month or two.

On 10 July, Senior Minister Ismail Sabri Yaakob announced that family entertainment centres including game arcades, karaoke centres, indoor funfairs, edutainment centres for children, and kids' gymnasiums could resume operations from 15 July.

On 28 August, Prime Minister Muhyiddin Yassin announced the extension of the RMCO by a further 4 months until 31 December 2020.

On 1 January 2021, Senior Minister Dato Seri Ismail Sabri Yaakob announced that the RMCO has been extended to 31 March 2021 as cases are still high.

==== Travel ====
On 5 December 2020, Senior Minister Ismail Sabri Yaakob announced that the Government would allow unrestricted interstate travel across states and districts from 7 December with the exception of areas under an Enhanced Movement Control Order (EMCO), which will still require a police permit.

=== Reinstatement of MCO restrictions, January–February 2021 ===
On 11 January 2021, Prime Minister Muhyiddin Yassin announced that Movement Control Order restrictions would be re-introduced to the states of Malacca, Johor, Penang, Selangor, Sabah and the federal territories of Kuala Lumpur, Putrajaya, and Labuan between 13 until 26 January 2021. It was dubbed as MCO 2.0 widely. These restrictions include:

- Banning travel between states and districts;
- Limiting travel 10 km away from homes;
- Stay at home orders;
- Only allowing two people per household to travel in cars and buy groceries;
- Banning social gatherings including weddings, seminars, and sports;
- Eateries and hawker stalls can only provide takeaway services and deliveries;
- Only five essential economic sectors allowed to operate: manufacturing, construction, services (including supermarkets, banks and health services), trade and distribution and plantations;
- Outdoor recreational activities limited to people from the same household;
- Non-essential workers must conduct remote work; and
- Five person limit at mosques and other places of worship.

On 15 January, Prime Minister Muhyiddin announced that MCO restrictions would be reimposed on Kelantan and Sibu, Sarawak between 16 and 29 January in response to a surge of cases. On 21 January, several betting outlets in peninsular Malaysia and Sabah announced they were closing until 4 February to comply with the Government's new Movement Control Order.

On 21 January, Senior Defence Minister Ismail Sabri Yaakob announced that the Government would be allowing restaurants, food stalls and food deliveries in states under the MCO to operate until 10 pm starting 22 January, easing a week-long rule of only allowing operations to run until 8 pm. On 21 January, the Malaysian Government extended the country's MCO restrictions in Selangor, Penang, Johor, Malacca, Sabah and the federal territories of Kuala Lumpur, Putrajaya and Labuan until 4 February due to a continuation of rising cases and deaths.

On 2 February, Senior Minister Ismail Sabri Yaakob extended MCO restrictions over all states except Sarawak from 5 to 18 February 2021. On 4 February, Ismail Sabri Yaakob announced that three business activities night markets, hair salons, and car wash services would be allowed to operate under a strict operating procedure from 5 February onwards as Phase One together with some businesses.

On 9 February, Senior Minister Ismail Sabri Yaakob confirmed that dining in and retail shops are allowed to open, subject to rule of 5 per table; which is being implemented from 10 February 2021, moving from Phase One to Phase Two. However, the Phase Two will only exist until July 2021.

On 11 February, Senior Minister Ismail Sabri Yaakob confirmed that gym activities, golf, table tennis, badminton and tennis would be allowed from 12 February with social distancing and time restrictions.

On 13 February, the National Unity Ministry confirmed that non-Muslim places of worship would be allowed to start reopening from 12 February for the remainder of the Movement Control Order, which is scheduled to end on 18 February 2021.

On 16 February, Senior Minister Ismail Sabri Yaakob announced that the government would extend the MCO for Selangor, Johor, Penang and Kuala Lumpur until 4 March 2021. Meanwhile, Kedah, Perak, Negeri Sembilan, Terengganu, Kelantan, Melaka, Pahang and Sabah as well as the federal territories of Putrajaya and Labuan transitioned back into the Conditional Movement Control Order (CMCO) from 19 February 2021.

On 25 February, Senior Minister Ismail Sabri Yaakob announced that the meetings, incentives, conferencing and exhibitions (MICE) sector in states under the Movement Control Order would be allowed to resume from 5 March 2021.

=== Transition to CMCO, March 2021 ===
On 5 March 2021, Selangor, Johor, Penang and Kuala Lumpur exited the Movement Control Order lockdown and entered the Conditional Movement Control Order (CMCO). This coincided with the launch of Malaysia National COVID-19 Immunisation Programme, which commenced the previous week.

On 12 March, Deputy Chief Minister Datuk Amar Douglas Uggah Embas confirmed that the CMCO in Sarawak would be extended by a further two weeks from 16 March to 29 March.

The CMCO in Sarawak was extended for two more weeks from 13 April until 26 April 2021. The Sarawak Disaster Management Committee subsequently extended the CMCO until 10 May and then 17 May.

The Conditional MCO (CMCO) has been extended to 28 April 2021 in Johor, Kelantan, Kuala Lumpur, Selangor and Penang. The Recovery MCO (RMCO) has been extended in Sabah, Melaka, Negeri Sembilan (except Seremban district under CMCO), Kedah (except Kuala Muda district under CMCO), Pelis, Perak, Terengganu, W.P Putrajaya and W.P Labuan from 13 to 28 April 2021.

=== Reinstatement of MCO 3.0 ===
Movement Control Order restrictions were reimposed in Kelantan from 16 April until 29 April 2021, before being extended until 17 May 2021.

From 3 May 2021, the Malaysian Government reimposed a two-week Movement Control Order in Johor, Kuala Lumpur, Penang, Sarawak, and Selangor in response to a spike in COVID-19 cases. Schools were closed and social and religious activities were banned. While some economic activities were allowed, eateries can only provide takeaway services.

From 6 May until 17 May 2021, the Malaysian Government re-imposed a two-week Movement Control Order in Selangor (except Sabak Bernam, Hulu Selangor, Kuala Selangor), in response to a spike in COVID-19 cases. MCO restrictions were also reimposed on Kuala Lumpur, Johor (Johor Bahru, Kulai, Kota Tinggi), Terengganu (Besut), and Perak (Larut Matang & Selama, Mukim Taiping) between 7 and 20 May 2021. The government has also imposed a nationwide ban on inter-district travel from 10 May until 6 June 2021.

On 8 May, Senior Minister (Security) Ismail Sabri Yaakob confirmed that the Malaysian Government would not implement a nationwide movement control order but will instead use targeted movement restrictions in response to local outbreaks. That same day, Ismail also confirmed that all interstate and inter-district travel without police approval would be banned nationwide from 10 May to 6 June 2021.

On 10 May, Prime Minister Muhyiddin Yassin announced that a nationwide Movement Control Order lockdown would be reinstated from 12 May to 7 June. Dining in, social activities and shopping areas will be banned, although workers are allowed to go to work and come back home. Inter-district and inter-state travel are banned.

A stricter form of the Movement Control Order lockdown was suggested by the government on 22 May. It was imposed on 25 May and lasts for two weeks. Under the updated form of the Movement Control Order, shoppers are only allowed to visit shopping malls and restaurants for only two hours. Shopping malls and eateries can only operate until 8 pm, and all sea and land transport services can only operate up to 50% of their capacity.

In May 2021, RapidKL trains' frequency times were extended to 10 minutes during peak hours, and 30 minutes during normal hours.

Sabah used a slightly different form of the Movement Control Order from 25 May onwards. Under its modified MCO, food and beverage outlets, grocery shops, self-service laundromats, and other businesses can only operate until 9 pm; all restaurants can only operate until 10 pm; customers visiting shopping malls, restaurants, grocery stores, hypermarkets, and mini-markets may be inside the premises for one hour; and said premises can only operate up to 50% of their capacity, with at least 200 square feet per customer. That ended with the nationwide lockdown on 1 June.

=== Total lockdown (FMCO) ===
On 28 May 2021, Prime Minister Muhyiddin announced that a nationwide "total lockdown" or Full Movement Control Order (FMCO) will be imposed on all social and economic sectors in Malaysia from 1 June to 14 June 2021. Under this lockdown, only essential economic and social services listed by the National Security Council will be allowed to operation. This will be followed by a second phase lasting four weeks from 14 June under which more sectors will be allowed to reopen, provided these activities do not involve large gatherings. The new master plan for exiting the lockdown will be announced in July 2021.

On 12 June 2021, the Malaysian Government extended the country's total lockdown (FMCO) by another two weeks until 28 June since daily new cases are still averaging over 5,000.

On 27 June 2021, the Malaysian government announced that country-wide lockdowns will be extended indefinitely until daily cases fall below 4,000. Restaurants are also allowed to operate from 6 am until 10 pm from 28 June onwards.

Due to the lockdown, more and more lower-income households are running out of food and income. Several activists organised the #benderaputih movement, calling the affected households to raise white flags or pieces of cloth to alert their neighbours and receive aid. At the same time, people raised red flags to ask for aid for their pets, and black flags to protest the government's poor handling of the pandemic.

As Perlis, Perak, Kelantan, Terengganu, and Pahang have met the conditions needed, the government has allowed these states to move to Phase 2 of the lockdown on 5 July. This allows more businesses to be opened up, such as stationary and book shops, computer and telecommunication outlets, barberstores (only for haircuts), farmers' markets, and morning markets.

On 7 July, Pulau Pinang entered into Phase 2 of the lockdown.

On 24 July, Prime Minister Muhyiddin announced that the construction sector was allowed to operate under strict compliance to the SOP, along with the construction of roads and other public infrastructures. He also stated that all workers in the construction sector must be vaccinated.

=== National Recovery Plan (NRP) ===
On 15 June 2021, Prime Minister Tan Sri Muhyiddin Yassin introduced a four-phase National Recovery Plan (NRP) to help the country emerge from the COVID-19 pandemic and its economic fallout.

As each phase is based on the number of new cases, people requiring ICU treatment, and vaccination rates (by having two shots), it can be extended, or moved on to the next phase, whenever possible. From 7 August onwards, the number of new Covid cases with serious symptoms were used to indicate whether a state was ready to move up to Phases 2 and 3. Asymptomatic cases were no longer counted, as over 40 percent of the adult population had been vaccinated by the time the policy was changed.

From 10 August onwards, fully-vaccinated people in Phase 2 and 3 states had more freedoms: they were required to wait for 14 days after their second dose (or 28 days for single-dose vaccines). Fully-vaccinated people were also able to be quarantined at home after returning, instead of being sent to a quarantine centre, provided they showed that they had no signs of infection within three days, and they presented their vaccination certificates From 20 August onwards, fully-vaccinated people were no longer affected by the 10-kilometre limit when travelling.

As around 66% of the country's population were vaccinated, and to make them more easier for the people to understand and follow, the government reduced the number of SOPs from 181 to just 10 in two weeks from 14 September 2021.

On 23 September 2021, petrol stations, restaurants, eateries, and convenience stores were allowed to operate from 6 am to 12 midnight, to aid the economic recovery of the country. Prime Minister Ismail Sabri Yaakob also announced that when 90% of Malaysia's population had been fully-vaccinated, interstate travel will be allowed again.

On 24 September 2021, the government planned to permit interstate travel within three weeks in early October, which would be when 90% of the adult population will have been fully-vaccinated. Home Minister Hamzah Zainudin also announced that foreign tourists will be allowed against when the country enters the endemic phase of the Covid outbreak.

On 27 September 2021, husbands were allowed to accompany mothers who were in labour, if they were fully-vaccinated. Muhyiddin Yassin, who headed the National Recovery Council, also announced that State Recovery Councils were set up in each state in Malaysia. From 4 October 2021, immediate family members were also allowed to accompany mothers or relatives who were giving birth.

From 1 October 2021, Genting Highlands, Melaka, and Tioman Island will have their own travel bubbles and get reopened for tourists. States under Phases 2 and 3 were also permitted to hold state and private functions, such as opening ceremonies and workshops, on the condition that all the guests were vaccinated and the number of people present were less than 50% of the venue's capacity. People who were not vaccinated were required to do saliva tests, or self-tests before the host or medical practitioners to check if they had the virus or not. Sports spectators and supporters were allowed to attend sports games or recreational venues, but they were not allowed to eat or drink.

On 15 October 2021, higher learning institutions were allowed to reopen. On 31 October, schools in Kedah and Kelantan were allowed to reopen; and on 1 November 2021, schools in Perak, Pulau Pinang, and Sabah were allowed to reopen.

Theme parks across the country are planned to be reopened on November, when 90% of Malaysia's adult population will be fully-vaccinated.

Industries Unite (a coalition of 110 local trade groups) has criticised the National Recovery Plan as being unclear.

==== Phase 1 ====
The conditions are the same as "total lockdown" launched from 1 June 2021. The phase ended on October 1 as Kedah, the last state to remain under the phase, moved to Phase 2.

- Gatherings of up to 2 people are only allowed at all times.
- No dine-in is allowed, until August 2021, and fully vaccinated persons are only allowed to dine-in up to 2 persons.
- All non-essential services were opened from 16 August 2021.
- Office attendance in the public sector is 40%
- Accounting services may operate with 60% capacity
- Operation hours for daily and public markets had been extended from 6 am to 4 pm
- Cycling and individual physical activities can be done within 2–3 metres in one's own neighbourhood
- Ports, airports, and the logistic sector can operate 24 hours a day
- Mines and quarries may operate with up to 60% capacity

Fully vaccinated people were allowed to attend prayers at mosques, temples, churches, and other houses of worship. Mosques in red zones were only able to take in 50 people, while mosques in orange, yellow, or green zones were able to take in 100 people.

On 19 August 2021, Muhyiddin had announced that dine-ins were allowed again in Phase 1 states and Kuala Lumpur, but only for fully-vaccinated individuals. The revised rule took effect on 20 August. Children under the age of 17 may follow their parents, but were required to follow SOPs. The government also allowed daily and night markets, camping, picnics, and various outdoor individual sports and recreational activities such as jogging, taichi, exercise, cycling, fishing, equestrian riding, skateboarding, archery, hiking, singles tennis and badminton, and golf.

On 21 August 2021, the 10 km travel radius limit was dropped in Phase One states for fully-vaccinated people, although interstate and interdistrict restrictions remained.

On 9 September 2021, cinemas were permitted to be reopened for fully-vaccinated people, but only at 50% capacity. Other activities related to the creative industry were allowed, including indoor busking, theatrical and lounge performances, art galleries, museums, and showrooms. All of them except for indoor busking were subjected to a 30% capacity rule.

On 10 September 2021, RapidKL reduced its waiting times for trains and buses to support the growing number of workers going back to their reopened workplaces. On peak hours, trains arrived at around 4 to 10 minutes, on non-peak hours, trains arrived from 7 to 12 minutes, and on weekends they arrived on 7 minutes (central business district for LRT Ampang/Sri Petaling) or 15 minutes.

On 1 October 2021, Kedah and Johor became the last states to leave Phase 1.

==== Phase 2 ====
The majority of the states are currently in this phase. Under this phase:

- Gatherings of up to 5 people are allowed for fully vaccinated, gatherings of up to 2 people are allowed for non-vaccinated
- More economic sectors will be reopened
- Non-essential services are opened from 16 July, and second batch on 17 August.
- Dine-in is allowed, and any mask-off activities are allowed (only for fully vaccinated persons)
- Some sectors may now permit up to 80% of their workers

Due to improving conditions, Perlis, Kelantan, Terengganu, Pahang, and Perak are the first states to enter into Phase 2 on 5 July.

On 7 July, Pulau Pinang moved to Phase 2.

On 10 July, Sabah moved to Phase 2. It also allowed dining-in at restaurants on the same day.

On 14 July, Sarawak moved to Phase 2. It allowed dining-in at restaurants on 15 July.

On 20 July, two more changes to Phase 2 SOPs were announced due to the increasing vaccination rate. Business premises and petrol stations were allowed to operate from 6 am to 10 pm. Only earlier film projects about drama, advertisements, and documentaries that were postponed due to MCO were allowed to resume, and they would only film outside the studio and away from residential areas with health screenings before, during, and after the filming.

On 20 August 2021, the state government of Sarawak banned dining-in at restaurants, restricted businesses to operate from 5 am to 8 pm, and prohibited anyone from leaving their homes after 10 pm except for emergencies. Those rules affected the southern districts of Kuching, Bau, Lundu, Samarahan, Asajaya, Simunjan, Serian and Tebedu, due to a wave of Covid infections. They were implemented from 21 to 28 August.

On 26 August 2021, Negeri Sembilan moved to Phase 2, due to dropping ICU hospitalisation rates (less than 40 percent) and 72.3 percent of the adult population completing two vaccine doses.

On 4 September 2021, Melaka moved to Phase 2.

On 10 September 2021, Selangor, Kuala Lumpur, and Putrajaya moved to Phase 2, with interdistrict travel permitted for fully-vaccinated individuals.

On 16 September 2021, Golden Screen Cinemas reopened several cinemas in the Klang Valley. It also reopened more locations on September 23.

On 18 September 2021, gyms were opened for fully-vaccinated people in Phase 2 and 3 states.

On 24 September 2021, Johor moved to Phase 2, allowing gatherings of up to 5 for fully vaccinated.

On 1 October 2021, Kedah moved to Phase 2.

On 18 October 2021, Kelantan, Perak, Pulau Pinang, Sabah, and Kedah became the last states to leave Phase 2.

==== Phase 3 ====
The country will move onto Stage 3 gradually by 26 October 2021 when 60 per cent of the population above 12 are fully vaccinated, new COVID cases are dropped into less than 1,000 and ICU bed usage has been dropped to 10.

- Gatherings of up to 8 people are allowed for fully vaccinated, gatherings of up to 5 people are allowed for non-vaccinated
- All economic sectors will be allowed, except those with large crowds (such as conventions, bars, salons, spas)
- Education and sports will be allowed in stages
- All manufacturing activities will be permitted, and capacity limits will be relaxed when all the workers in a place are vaccinated.
- Dining in restaurants and cafes will be allowed.
- Gym, swimming, jetski will be allowed from 6 am to 12 pm

This phase began early on August 4 as Sarawak, Perlis, and Labuan met the criteria.

On 4 September 2021, Negeri Sembilan moved to Phase 3, most likely due to the high number of vaccinations there.

On 24 September, Pahang moved to Phase 3, allowing gatherings of up to eight for fully vaccinated.

On 1 October, Selangor, Kuala Lumpur, Putrajaya, Melaka, and Kedah moved to Phase 3, as the overall R-naught, daily infections, and ICU COVID-19 patient rates had dropped in those states.

==== Phase 4 ====
The country will move onto Stage 4 gradually by 31 December 2021 when 80–90 per cent of the population above 12 are fully vaccinated, new COVID cases are dropped into single digits and ICU bed usage has been dropped to the bare minimum. Under this phase:

- No gathering limit, all economic sectors will be reopened
- Social activities will resume to some degree
- Interstate travel will be allowed according to SOPs.

Although this phase was initially expected to start in late-October, Labuan was the first state to reach this stage on 26 August, as 92.4 percent of the adult residents of the island were vaccinated, new Covid cases had dropped to single digits, and ICU bed usage in local hospitals had dropped to zero.

In September 2021, the government decided to suspend Islamic religious teachers and school teachers who refuse to get vaccinated. Children of unvaccinated parents will not be allowed to physically attend schools when they will reopen next year.

On 24 September, Negeri Sembilan moved to Phase 4, with no gathering limits and all economic sectors to be reopened.

On 8 October 2021, Pahang moved to Phase 4.

On 9 October, Prime Minister Ismail Sabri Yaakob confirmed that interstate travel will be allowed to resumed within the next few days once 90% of the adult population has been fully vaccinated. As of 7 October, 89.1% of the adult population has been fully vaccinated. On 10 October, all interstate and international restrictions for residents fully vaccinated against COVID-19 were lifted since 90% of Malaysia's adult population had been fully vaccinated.

On 18 October 2021, Kuala Lumpur, Selangor, Putrajaya, and Melaka moved to Phase 4.

On 25 October 2021, Johor, Terengganu moved to Phase 4.

On 7 November 2021, the government stated that they might close the borders of states with an RT rate that crosses 1.0.

On 8 November 2021, Perlis, Kedah, Penang, Perak and Sabah moved to Phase 4.

On 3 January 2022, Sarawak and Kelantan moved to Phase 4, ending movement restrictions in Malaysia.

== Measures by state and territories ==
=== Johor ===
On 2 November 2020, the Ministry of Health's Training Institute in Johor Bahru was placed under an Enhanced Movement Control Order (EMCO) after 46 trainees tested positive for COVID-19. This EMCO will affect 1,559 people including students, teachers, and their families.

=== Kedah ===
On 3 August 2020, four sub-district in Kubang Pasu were placed under EMCO due to increased new cases caused by Nasi Kandar restaurant in Napoh town.

On 10 September 2020, Senior Minister Ismail Sabri Yaakob placed an enhanced movement control order (MCO) on the district of Kota Setar from midnight 11 September to 23 September following an increase in COVID-19 cases. Residents will not be allowed to leave the area and outsiders will not be allowed to enter.

On 16 September 2021, Langkawi was reopened under a travel bubble for fully-vaccinated tourists from any state, including Phase One states. Children who visit the island must be accompanied by fully-vaccinated adults.

=== Kelantan ===
CMCO in the whole of Kelantan is launched on 21 November until 6 December 2020. It is then extended for Kota Bharu, Machang, Pasir Mas and Tanah Merah from 7 December until 20 December 2020. Kubang Kerian in Kota Bharu & Kusial in Tanah Merah will continue the CMCO from 12 December until 20 December 2020, while other districts' CMCO is lifted and change back to RMCO.

MCO 2.0 in Kelantan started from 16 January until 18 February 2021. Then, it is changed from MCO 2.0 back to CMCO from 19 February to 15 April 2021.

But, due to the sudden rapid surge in new cases in Kelantan areas, the government had announced that 7 districts in Kelantan involving Tumpat, Kota Bharu, Pasir Mas, Machang, Bachok, Pasir Puteh and Tanah Merah will enter MCO 3.0 from 16 April until 29 April 2021. After that, the remaining district in Kelantan, which are Jeli, Kuala Krai, and Gua Musang will start implementing MCO3.0 together with the remaining districts from 22 April to 29 April 2021. As what government announced on 27 April in his press conference, MCO3.0 in whole Kelantan is extended again from 30 April to 17 May 2021.

During this period, primary and secondary schools in all 7 districts stated will be changed to online classes temporarily from 24 April until 12 June 2021.

=== Kuala Lumpur ===
On 7 June 2020, the Mayor of Kuala Lumpur Nor Hisham Ahmad Dahlan announced that the Kuala Lumpur City Hall will allow open markets, morning markets, night markets and bazaars to reopen in stages following the implementation of the Recovery Movement Control Order on 15 June.

On 1 October 2021, mosques in Kuala Lumpur were allowed to have full capacity. Zoo Negara was also reopened to the public.

=== Labuan ===
On 15 October 2020, Senior Minister for Security Ismail Sabri Yaakob placed the federal territory of Labuan under a conditional movement control order, which would run from 17 October to 30 October. Under this lockdown, all economic activities will be allowed to operate but religious, cultural, and social sectors including schools and kindergartens will remain close. The conditional movement control order in Labuan was subsequently extended from 31 October until 13 November.

=== Negeri Sembilan ===
On 30 September 2020, Negeri Sembilan's Human Resources, Plantation and Non-Islamic Affairs committee chairman J. Arul Kumar announced that the annual ten-day Deepavali carnival, which had been scheduled to be held between 4 and 13 November, had been cancelled due to the COVID-19 pandemic following advice from the National Security Council.

=== Pahang ===
From 21 to 31 March 2020, the state of Pahang has enacted that all business stores in Kuantan, Pekan, Bentong, Jerantut and Temerloh (Cameron Highlands had already begun to implement the measure on 16 March) must only operate during the day up to 12 hours, and need to close after 7 pm to 7 am. According to the measurement, all shops that were originally allowed to operate during the period of the control order, including drive-thru restaurants, fast food restaurants, and petrol stations, are no longer allowed to operate between 7 pm and 7 am. From 1 April, PDRM's state division tightened state borders and set up roadblocks on the state's major highways.

=== Perak ===
Wholesale market operating hours in Perak during the MCO were designated from 4 am to 10 am, however, from 6 April 2020, wet food-related businesses such as poultry and seafood were designated from 4 am to 10 am, while businesses for vegetables and fruits were designated from 11 am to 4 pm. The closure from 10 am till 11 pm was dedicated for cleaning processes.

=== Sabah ===
On 10 September 2020, Senior Minister Ismail Sabri Yaakob announced that an enhanced MCO would be placed around Tawau prison from 11 September till 23 September, affecting prisoners, inmates and their families. During this period, visitations will not be allowed.

On 28 September 2020, Senior Minister Ismail Sabri Yaakob announced that an enhanced MCO would be enforced in Lahad Datu, Tawau, Kunak, and Semporna between 29 September and October 12. During that period, residents will not be allowed to leave the four districts, non-residents and visitors would be barred from entering, and all business activities except those providing essential goods and services would have to cease.

On 5 October 2020, Senior Minister Ismail Sabri Yaakob announced that the state capital Kota Kinabalu, Penampang, and Putatan would be placed under a Conditional Movement Control Order (CMCO) commencing 7 October. Under the conditional MCO, travel into these districts will be limited, express and transit buses will not be allowed to operate, and only essential services such as food and health services will be allowed to operate. The following day, Senior Minister Ismail announced that the federal government would ban most interstate travel to and from Sabah with the exceptions of emergencies, deaths, and essential services subject to approval from the Ministry of Health. Travel would be limited to Sabah natives, essential workers, civil servants working in Sabah, and permanent residents residing in Sabah.

On 2 November 2020, Senior Minister Ismail Sabri Yaakob announced that the EMCOs at the Kepayan Prison and Taman Mat Salleh Prison Quarters in Kota Kinabalu would be extended by two weeks until 16 November.

On 7 May 2021, the Sabah state government banned any non-essential inter-district travel for the duration of a CMCO lockdown between 10 and 16 May. For the duration of the CMCO, Kota Kinabalu, Putatan and Penampang would be considered to be one district.

On 3 July 2021, the city council of Sandakan allowed dining-in at restaurants for only two people per table, following the orders of Chief Minister Hajiji Noor.

On 13 August 2021, Sabah's government decided that only fully-vaccinated people can enter into supermarkets and restaurants, due to the high number of cases. This is to rush the people of Sabah into being completely vaccinated within a month.

On 1 October 2021, Sabah allowed grocery stores, convenience stores, mini markets, and hypermarkets to be opened from 6 am to 10 pm. Petrol stations and their convenience stores were allowed to be opened from 5 am to midnight. Restaurant operators including hotels, sports and recreation club houses, eateries, food stalls, food trucks, roadside hawkers, circulating hawkers, food courts, hawker centers, roadside food stalls or kiosks were able to operate from 6 am to midnight.

=== Sarawak ===
On 27 July 2020, Senior Minister Ismail Sabri Yaakob announced that the Malaysian government will limit inter-zone (Zone 1: Kuching, Samarahan and Serian division. Zone 2: Sri Aman, Betong, Sibu, Sarikei, Mukah, Kapit, Bintulu, Miri and Limbang division) movement in Sarawak between 1 and 14 August at the request of the Sarawak Government to curb the spread of COVID-19 within that state, particularly around the state capital Kuching.

On 6 December 2020, the Sarawak Disaster Management Committee (SDMC) allowed spas, wellness and reflexology centres in the state to resume operations effective from 7 December.

On 29 May 2021, Sarawak's government imposed a stricter lockdown for two weeks until June 11. Under the lockdown's rules, movement from 10 pm to 5 am was not allowed except in emergencies, and children under the age of 12 were not allowed to go to crowded places like shopping malls.

After Sarawak was placed under Phase 1 of the nationwide lockdown, it was moved to Phase 2 on 14 July 2021. Its state government originally planned to permit dining-in in restaurants on 7 June, but due to repeated surges in Covid cases, it banned dining-in in restaurants until 16 July, and ordered that only restaurant owners and workers who received their first vaccination were allowed to resume their work

On 19 July 2021, the Disaster Management Committee of Sibu has ordered that all business operators and their workers must be fully-vaccinated in order to continue working, and they must show a vaccination certificate at their shops' entrance.

On 20 August 2021, the state government of Sarawak banned dining-in at restaurants, restricted businesses to operate from 5 am to 8 pm, and prohibited anyone from leaving their homes after 10 pm except for emergencies. Those rules affected the southern districts of Kuching, Bau, Lundu, Samarahan, Asajaya, Simunjan, Serian and Tebedu, due to a wave of Covid infections. They were implemented from 21 to 28 August.

On 6 October 2021, interdistrict travel was allowed without needing a permit.

=== Selangor ===
On 10 October 2020, Senior Minister Ismail Sabri Yaakob announced that weddings would be limited to 250 people in the Klang District. An earlier announcement had limited weddings to 500 people.

On 14 October 2020, the Klang Valley was placed under a Conditional Movement Control Order (CMCO) with inter-district movement prohibited until 27 October. 96 roadblocks were set up to enforce this movement restriction with only workers with valid passes and authorisation letters being able to travel between districts. While offices, restaurants, and shopping malls remain open, they are subject to stricter health and social distancing rules. The CMCO also affects the Federal Territories of Kuala Lumpur and Putrajaya, which lie within the boundaries of Selangor.

On 20 October 2020, employees in the private and public sectors, at the management and supervisory levels, in areas under the Conditional Movement Control Order (CMCO) were instructed to conduct remote work starting Thursday, 22 October.

On 1 February 2021, the "State Investment, Industry and Commerce, and Small and Medium Entreprises" (SMEs) chairman Teng Chang Khim announced that Selangor's Chinese New Year celebration will be held online via social media due to the ongoing pandemic.

On 17 May 2021, the Malaysian Health Ministry indicated that it may order a total shutdown in Selangor if current Movement Control Order restrictions are unable to curb a sharp spike in cases in that state. Due to recent daily cases rising up to over 2,000, the government has enacted an Emergency Movement Control Order on July 3 for two weeks on most of the state, except for several districts in the north.

On 3 July 2021, the Works Ministry ordered all construction work in EMCO areas to be stopped. Only critical maintenance, repair, and wiring works are allowed if they have appointments.

On 17 July 2021, the EMCO placed over eight districts in Selangor ended. Only four locations in Damansara, Ampang, Klang, and Batu remained under EMCO until July 31.

=== Terengganu ===
The Royal Malaysia Police in Terengganu planned to impose traffic control based on vehicle registration numbers, where vehicles with odd or even registration numbers are only allowed to travel during odd- or even-numbered days, respectively, starting 1 April 2020. The plan was later postponed the day before the rollout to allow a detailed study of the proposed control.

== Effects ==
=== Arrests and crime ===
Despite the past condemnation, the Malaysian authorities have arrested hundreds of people for violating the Movement Control Order since mid-April. Violators are fined, jailed or sent to perform community service as part of their punishment. The sentence jail term ranges from 2 days to several months. Violators unable to pay their fines will have to serve prison sentences.

According to a Human Rights Watch report, 15,000 people had been arrested by 18 March for breaching the movement control order. On 2 April 2020, Minister of Defence Ismail Sabri Yaakob reported that 4,189 individuals had been arrested over the past two weeks for flouting the movement control order. Of these, 1,449 individuals have been charged in court. On 3 May, Nurul Hidayah Ahmad Zahid, the daughter of President of UMNO, Ahmad Zahid Hamidi her husband, Saiful Nizam Mohd Yusoff were caught for flouting the MCO.

After the director-general of the Malaysian Prison Department raised concerns about prison overcrowding, the Malaysian Government shifted to fine violators. On 15 April, the Defence Minister Ismail Sabri Yaakob announced that the police would be criminally prosecuting violators and detained them in thirteen police academies that had been converted into makeshift detention centres. Human rights organisations condemned the move as it further promotes the spread of coronavirus due to overcrowding in prisons. In late April, Human Rights Watch's Asia Director Phil Robertson called on the Malaysian government to stop jailing people who had flouted the movement control order, but recommended the use of the newly built facilities to keep lockdown violators.

The MCO has led to a decrease in the national crime rate by around 70%. Data from the Ministry of Women, Family and Community Development suggested a slight increase of domestic violence nationwide during the MCO, however in control.

On 20 June, Senior Minister Ismail Sabri Yaakob confirmed that 48 individuals had been arrested by the Royal Malaysian Police's Compliance Operations Task Force for violating the Recovery Movement Control Order (RMCO). Ten of these were arrested for engaging in reflexology and massaging activities while 38 were charged with violating social distancing rules. 3,774 compliance teams are consisting of 16,675 personnel.

On 4 July, Senior Minister Ismail Sabri Yaakob confirmed that 77 people had been arrested as of 3 July for violating the RMCO including initiating contact sports activities (15), pub and night club activities (12) and violating standard operating procedures (SOPs). 495 constructions sites were reported to have violated standard operating procedures while 2,738 have complied with SOPs.

=== Economy ===
With the country known as the world's top rubber glove maker, concerns have risen especially from the European Union (EU) over the impacts of the movement control to Malaysia's glove exports especially with the increasing glove shortages among European healthcare sectors. This subsequently led the EU to send a letter on 25 March to the Malaysian counterpart for the relaxation of the movement control order on the glove sectors. Through a positive replied made by the Malaysian Ministry of International Trade and Industry to allowing continuous operations, a letter was subsequently distributed by the Malaysia Rubber Glove Manufacturers Association on 27 March to glove manufacturers in the country to allowing their factories to remain open from 1 April. The U.S. Customs and Border Protection (CBP) also had removed a ban on glove exports to the United States by a Malaysian glove company previously accused of using forced labour as part of the American government efforts to boost supplies of their healthcare sectors due to the increasing shortages of medical equipment caused by the pandemic.

=== Education ===
The Prime Minister had instructed the Ministry of Education to implement home-based learning initiatives throughout the duration of MCO as schools nationwide were closed during the period. Assessments and examinations for various national higher education programmes were cancelled as some institutes were converted into temporary surveillance and quarantine centres, and students' performance evaluations were replaced by continuous assessment scores. Also, the national examination, SPM was delayed to January 2021 from the originally scheduled November 2020.

On 10 June, Education Minister Mohd Radzi Md Jidin confirmed that schools throughout Malaysia would begin reopening in stages from 24 June, with priority being given to students taking secondary and equivalent international leaving exams. As part of social distancing measures, students will have their temperatures tested, will have to sit at least one-metre apart, and schools will serve pre-packaged food.

On 23 June, the Ministry of Education announced changes to school term holidays in order to help schools better plan lessons that had been disrupted by the pandemic and Movement Control Order. The mid-term holidays would be reduced from nine days to five days. In addition, the end of the year holidays in schools in Group A states (Johor, Kedah, Kelantan, and Terengganu) would be reduced from 42 days to 14 days. The end of the year holidays in Group B states (Malacca, Negri Sembilan, Pahang, Perak, Perlis, Penang, Sabah, Sarawak, Selangor, Kuala Lumpur, Labuan and Putrajaya) would be reduced from 41 days to 13 days. The Education Ministry confirmed that the school year for 2020 will now total 168 days. In response, former Education Minister Maszlee Malik criticised the Ministry for not consulting with teachers and teachers' unions including the National Union of the Teaching Profession and West Malaysia Malay Teachers Union prior to amending the school term.

=== Essential supplies ===
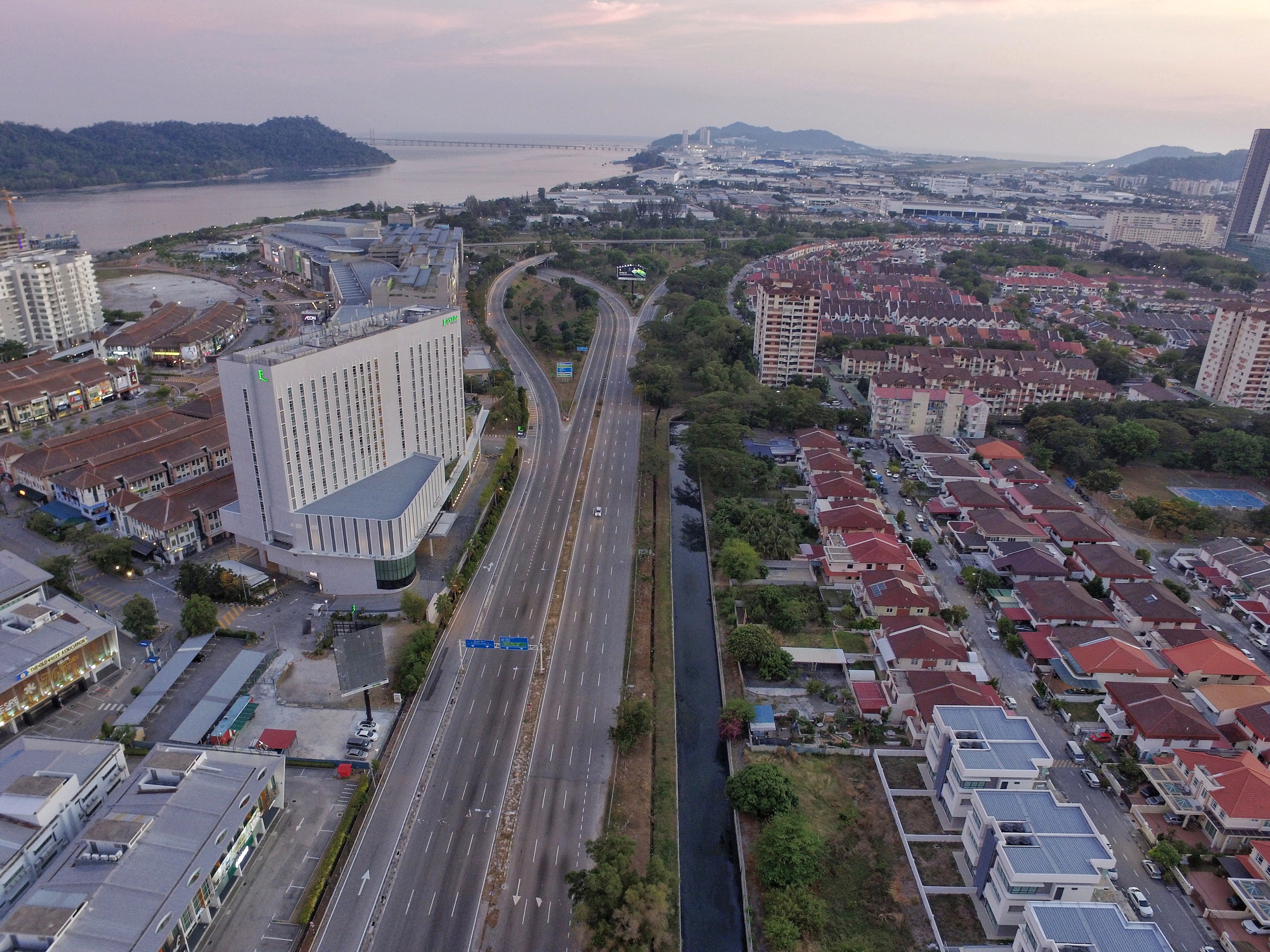
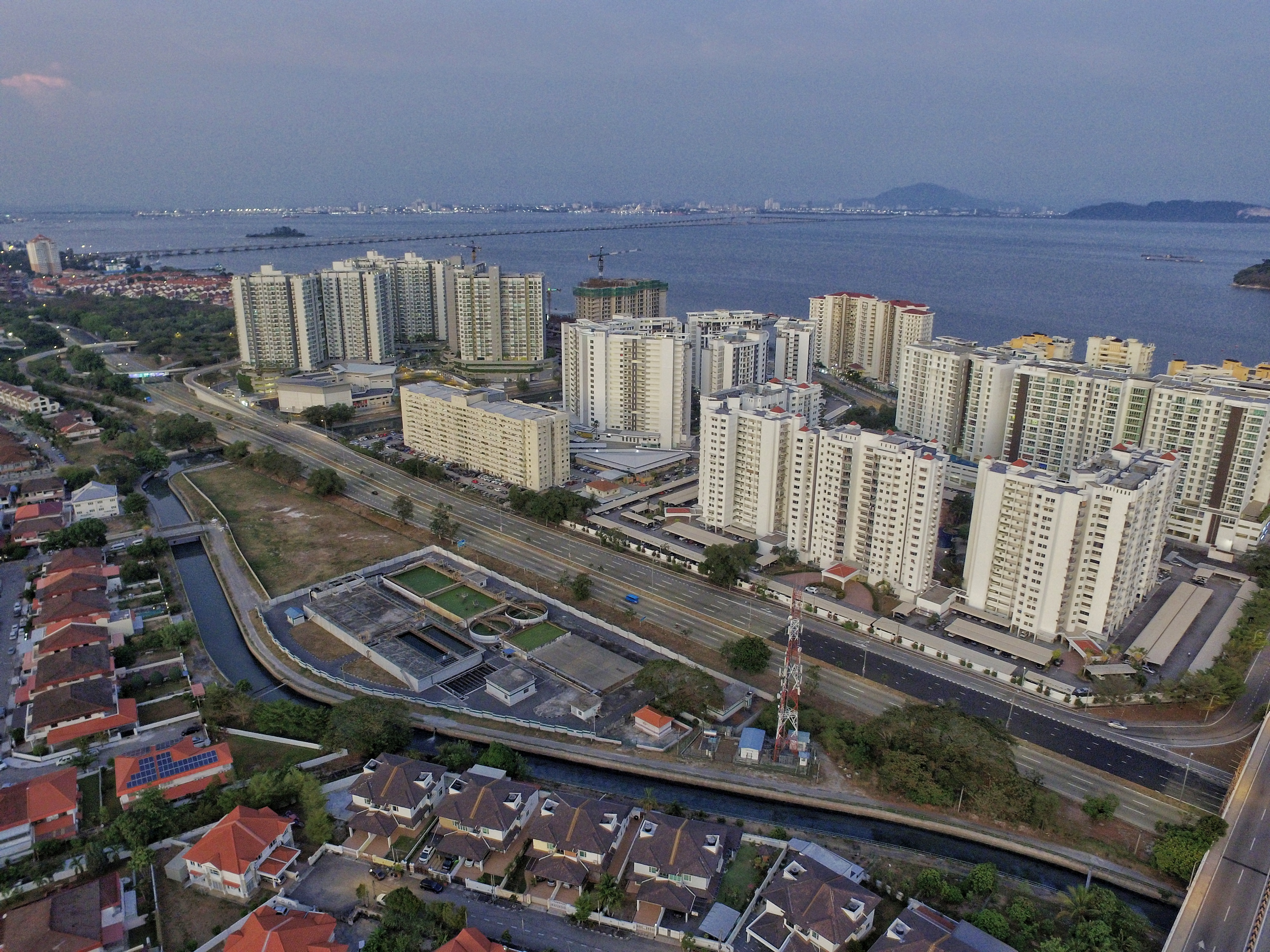
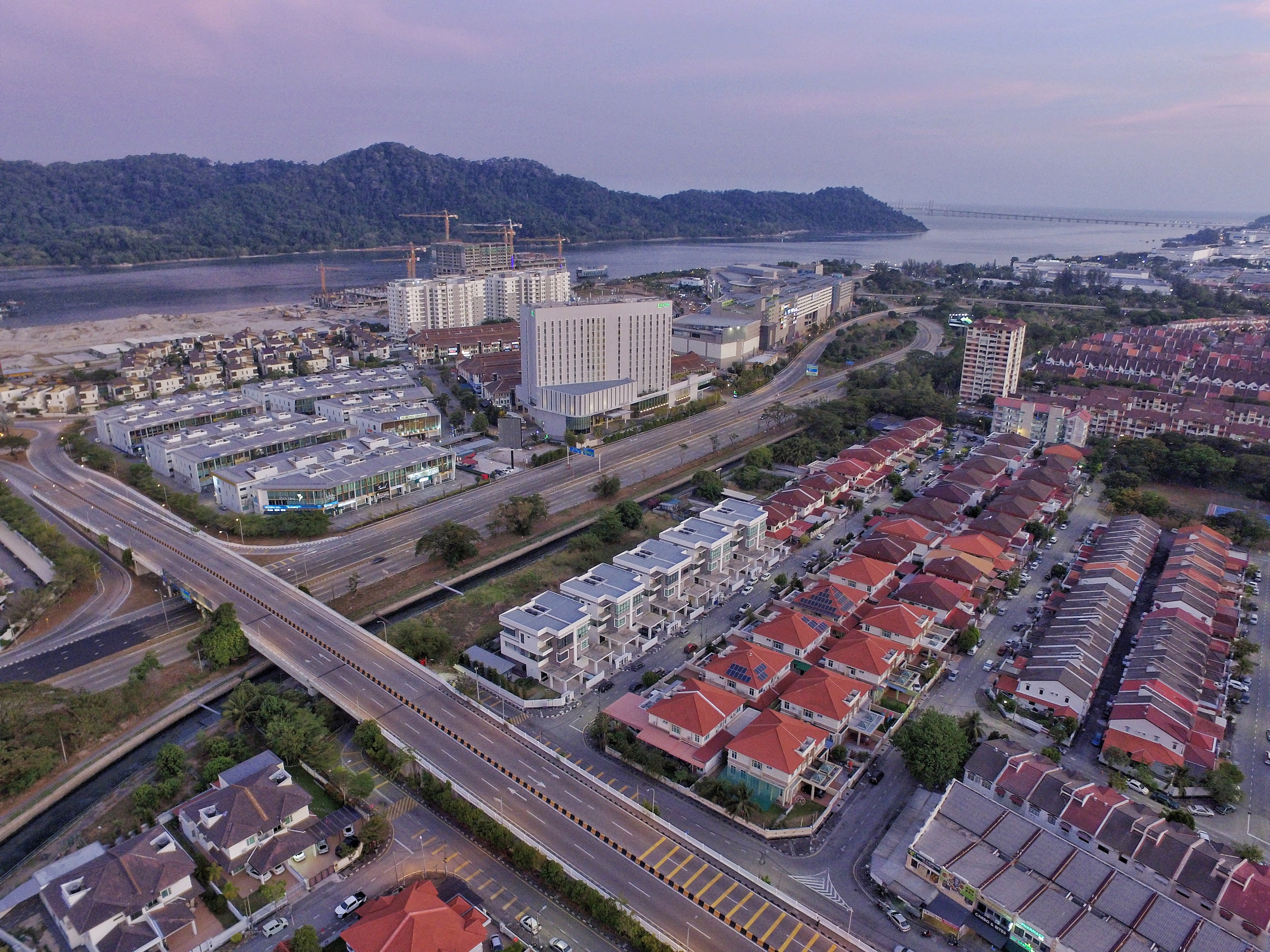
The usually crowded Lim Chong Eu Expressway and its surroundings (Queensbay Mall) in Penang deserted throughout the movement control order as seen on 22 March 2020.

Before Malaysia announced the movement control order, supermarkets across the country began to see a surge in panic buying, and the supply of surgical masks everywhere was out, causing prices to skyrocket. In response, the Prime Minister of Malaysia assured people in a televised speech on 16 March that the supply of food, daily essentials and healthcare (including surgical masks), were sufficient nationwide, adding that the Ministry of Domestic Trade and Consumer Affairs would be monitoring the food supply and the daily demand of markets during the control order.

=== Travel and transportation ===
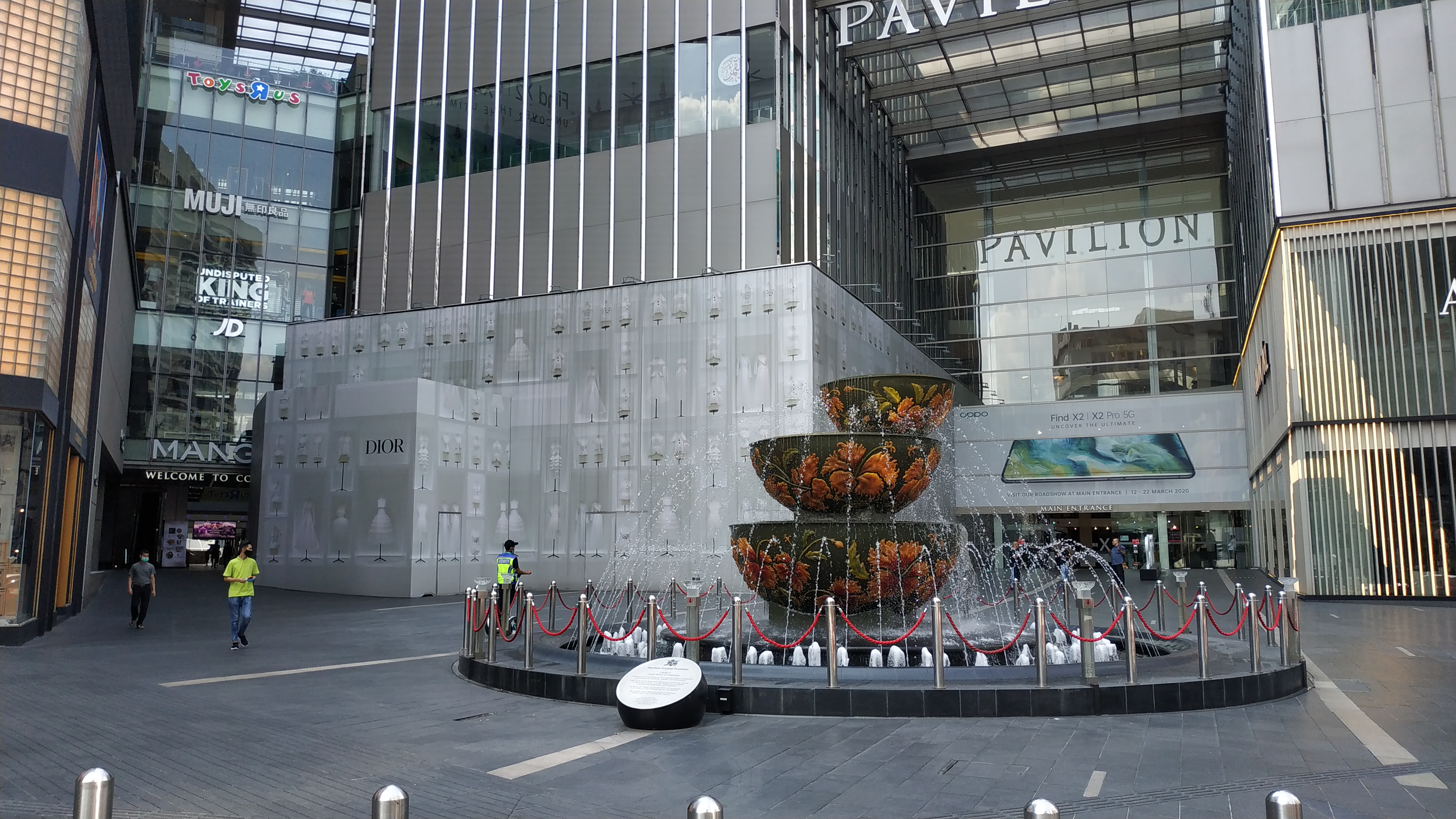
Square in front of the Pavilion Kuala Lumpur shopping mall on 20 March 2020 during the movement control order.

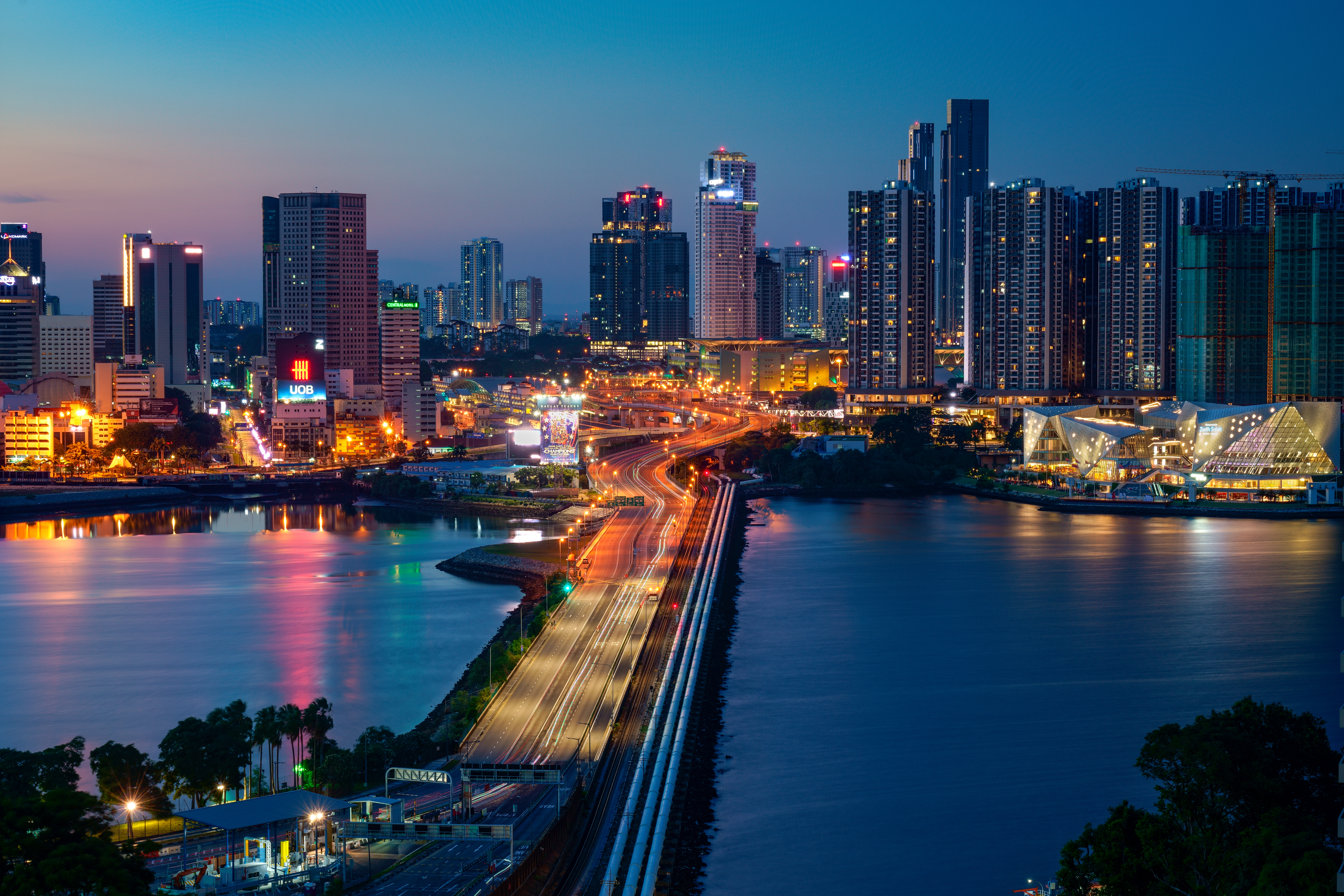
Empty view of Johor–Singapore Causeway

Scores of Malaysians working in Singapore and foreigners rushed back to the immigration checkpoints in the hope to return to Singapore before the order became effective. Singapore-based public transport operators had arranged temporary accommodation at several hotels to accommodate the affected Malaysian Bus Captains. Scheduled bus services travelling between Singapore and Johor Bahru were suspended as well. The announcement of the movement control order reportedly caused some anxiety among Singaporean residents over their food supplies, of which a significant portion came from Malaysia. Panic buying briefly returning in Singapore as Singaporeans rushed to supermarkets to stock basic necessities, and Singapore's ministers and Prime Minister had to assure them that there would be enough supplies for the country, and that the flow of goods between the two countries would continue.

Moments after the order was announced in Malaysia, With the announcement of the movement control, various diplomatic missions such as the United States and France have ceased issuing visas, while India prohibited Malaysian citizens from travelling to its country. Thai residents headed out of Malaysia in large numbers while the large community of Indonesians in Malaysia also prepared for the situation as reported by their embassy. Other diplomatic missions were closely monitoring the situation of the restrictive movement order and awaited further instructions both from their government and the Malaysian government.

As the number of passengers decreased significantly during the movement control order and to reduce the risk of infection of passengers and employees, Malaysia's main bus operator, Rapid Bus readjusted the frequency of all its buses starting from 20 March where it also encouraged the people to plan their trips. Rapid Ferry also made adjustments by reducing to two ferries each day to operate starting from 20 March. Each shift was changed from the original 20 minutes to 30 minutes. After 10 pm, the frequency of the ferry service will be changed to 1 hour. As for the last ferry ride time, it will depend on the arrival time of the last bus in Penang Sentral.

On 4 April 2020, all Express Rail Link rail services were to be suspended until the end of the control period due to significant reductions in passenger flow.

On 16 April 2020, Defence Minister Ismail Sabri Yaakob clarified that any form of mass movements and interstate travel would be prohibited during Ramadan as long as the Movement Control Order remains in force until 28 April. Many Muslim Malaysians visit their families and hometowns during the Ramadan period.

=== Social gatherings ===
On 5 November 2020, Senior Minister Ismail Sabri Yaakob has announced that Malaysians living in areas under both Enhanced Movement Control Order (EMCO) and Conditional Movement Control Order (CMCO) restrictions would not be allowed to cross borders during the upcoming Deepavali holiday on 14 November. It is customary for people to travel home and visit families during the Deepavali holiday.

On 18 December 2020, Senior Minister Ismail Sabri Yaakob announced that Christmas gatherings on 25 December will be limited to 20 people at landed properties and 10 people at apartments and condominiums within areas under recovery and conditional movement control orders. Within areas under enhanced MCO, only household Christmas gatherings will be allowed. In addition, church masses will be allowed between 5 pm and 9:30 pm on 24 December for a maximum of two sessions.

On 29 April 2021, the Higher Education Ministry permitted students from higher learning institutions to return to their families to celebrate Hari Raya Aidilfitri from May 7 to 12. They will return to campus from May 15 to 20. They were only allowed to use their own vehicles, be picked up by their parents or guardians, travel by air, or board buses provided by their institutions.

=== Politics ===
President of United Malays National Organisation (UMNO) Ahmad Zahid Hamidi announced that the party would withdraw its support for Prime Minister Muhyiddin Yassin and his government over the government's handling of the pandemic, including the indefinite extension of the MCO, in July 2021.

== National Security Council's Power ==
Yusramizza Md Isa, Senior Law Lecturer at Universiti Utara Malaysia, noted that the government's actions in issuing the MCO are under the auspices of the Prevention and Control of Infectious Diseases Act 1988. Under Section 5 of the Prevention and Control of Infectious Diseases Act 1988, the Health Ministry is the main authority in charge.

However, on 6 April 2020, Minister of Defence Ismail Sabri Yaakob reported that only the National Security Council (NSC) can issue directives during the MCO.

Yusramizza further noted that unless "disaster emergency" or "a security area" is declared by the Prime Minister based on Section 18 of the National Security Council Act 2016 and Article 25 of the Malaysia National Security Council Directive 20, the military is not empowered to arrest, seize and search.

Kuala Lumpur lawyers Haeme Hashim and CK Lew from Messrs. Haeme Lew suggested that the government ought to declare a "disaster emergency" according to Article 25 of the Malaysia National Security Council Directive 20 and for the entirety of Malaysia to be declared as a "security area" under Section 18 of the National Security Council Act 2016, failing which the NSC and military do not have full power in administering this Movement Control Order. Only the police have full power and the military only works to assist the police in strengthening control over the order.

Civil society organisation Malaysians Against Death Penalty and Torture (Madpet) has stated that a special task force may be formed to assist health ministry, but not the NSC. A spokesperson for Madpet Charles Hector noted that the Malaysian government may have quietly and wrongly resorted to using the draconian National Security Council Act 2016 in the combat to curb and defeat the coronavirus threat as the NSC, under the NSC Act, seemed to be making decisions and issuing orders on coronavirus-related issues. Hector notes that the Ministry of Health's authority may be ousted by the NSC, and that the NSC may be wrongly taking overpower and control from the Ministry of Health, which is really the responsible Ministry under the Prevention And Control Of Infectious Diseases Act 1988.

== See also ==
- 2020–21 Singapore circuit breaker measures
- COVID-19 lockdowns
- COVID-19 community quarantines in the Philippines
- COVID-19 lockdown in China
- COVID-19 lockdown in India
- COVID-19 lockdowns in Italy
- COVID-19 vaccination in Malaysia
- Indonesia large-scale social restrictions
