= Mahadi Che Ngah =

Malaysian civil servant

Yang Berbahagia Datuk Seri Mahadi Che Ngah SMW PMW SMP JMW
- مهدي چئ ڠه

13th Mayor of Kuala Lumpur
- In office 1 October 2020 – 31 March 2023
- Preceded by: Nor Hisham Ahmad Dahlan
- Succeeded by: Kamarulzaman Mat Salleh

Personal details
- Born: 1959 (age 66–67)

Mahadi bin Che Ngah is a Malaysian retired civil servant who served as the 13th Mayor of Kuala Lumpur from October 2020 to his retirement in March 2023.

== Honours ==
- Federal Territory (Malaysia) :
  - Grand Commander of the Order of the Territorial Crown (SMW) – Datuk Seri (2021)
  - Commander of the Order of the Territorial Crown (PMW) – Datuk (2014)
  - Companion of the Order of the Territorial Crown (JMW) (2008)
- Pahang :
  - Companion of the Order of the Crown of Pahang (SMP) (2005)
