= Kamarulzaman Mat Salleh =

Malaysian civil servant

Yang Berbahagia Datuk Seri Haji Kamarulzaman Mat Salleh SMW PMW AMN AMW
- قمرالزمان مت صالح

14th Mayor of Kuala Lumpur
- In office 17 April 2023 – 14 August 2024
- Preceded by: Mahadi Che Ngah
- Succeeded by: Maimunah Mohd Sharif

Personal details
- Born: 1964 (age 61–62) Malaysia
- Party: Independent
- Education: University of Technology Malaysia (Bachelor's degree in Surveying (Property Management))
- Occupation: Civil servant

Datuk Seri Kamarulzaman bin Mat Salleh is a Malaysian civil servant who served as the 14th Mayor of Kuala Lumpur from April 2023 to August 2024. He was the Executive Director (Project Management) of the Kuala Lumpur City Hall (DBKL) prior to his promotion to the Mayor of Kuala Lumpur. He has worked with DBKL since 1991.

== Honours ==
- Malaysia :
  - Member of the Order of the Defender of the Realm (AMN) (2015)
- Federal Territory (Malaysia) :
  - Grand Commander of the Order of the Territorial Crown (SMW) – Datuk Seri (2024)
  - Commander of the Order of the Territorial Crown (PMW) – Datuk (2021)
  - Member of the Order of the Territorial Crown (AMW) (2018)
