= Nor Hisham Ahmad Dahlan =

Malaysian civil servant

Yang Berbahagia Datuk Seri Nor Hisham Ahmad Dahlan SMW DPMS SMS
- نور هشام أحمد دحلان

12th Mayor of Kuala Lumpur
- In office 2 October 2018 – 30 September 2020
- Preceded by: Mhd Amin Nordin Abdul Aziz
- Succeeded by: Mahadi Che Ngah

Personal details
- Born: 1957 (age 68–69)

Nor Hisham bin Ahmad Dahlan (born 1957) is a Malaysian retired civil servant who served as 12th Mayor of Kuala Lumpur from 2018 to 2020.

== Honours ==
- Federal Territory (Malaysia)
  - Grand Commander of the Order of the Territorial Crown (SMW) – Datuk Seri (2021)
- Selangor :
  - Knight Commander of the Order of the Crown of Selangor (DPMS) – Dato' (2012)
  - Companion of the Order of the Crown of Selangor (SMS) (2008)
