= Administrative and Diplomatic Officer =

Administrative officers who working for Malaysian government

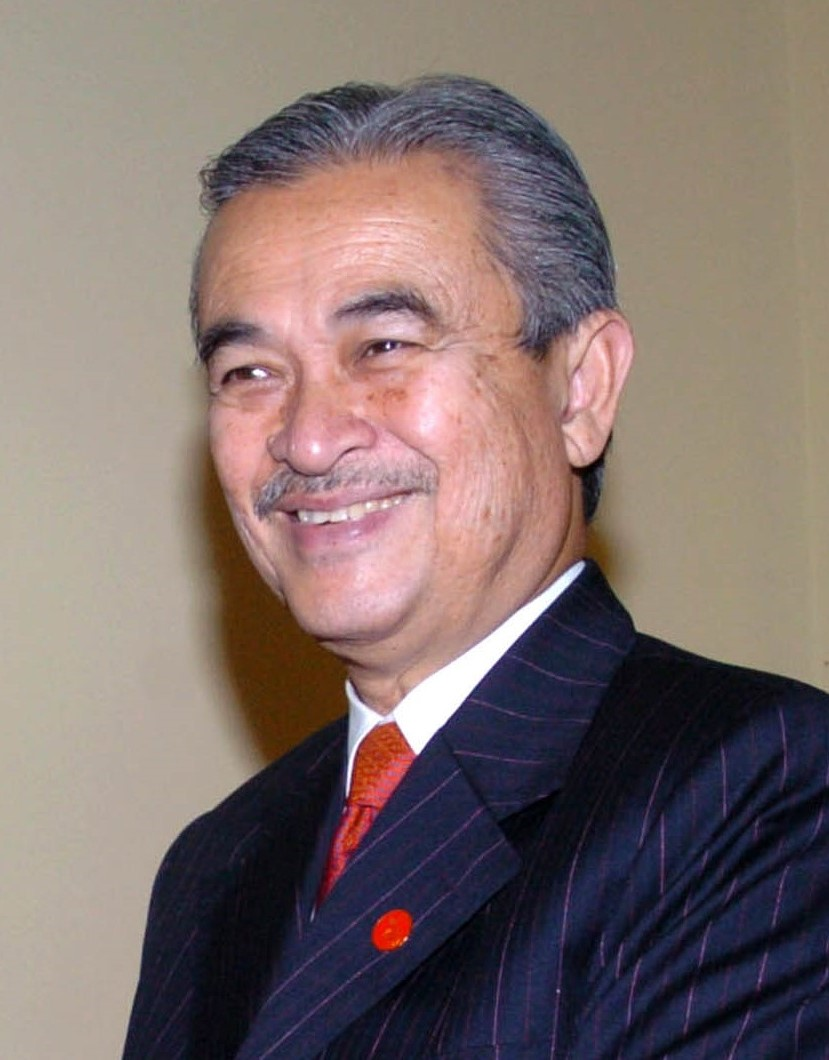
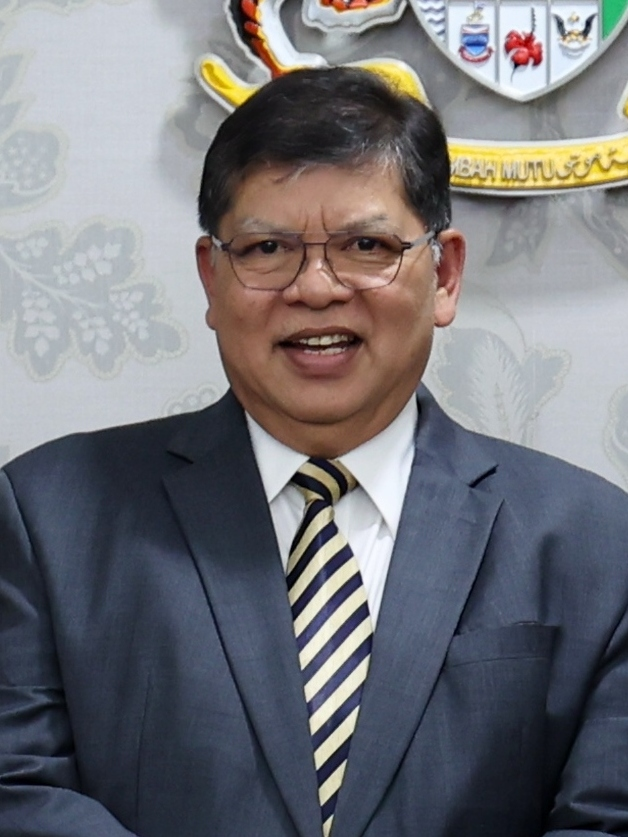
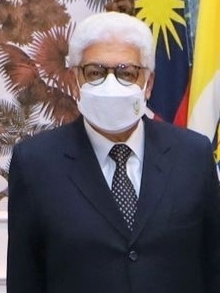
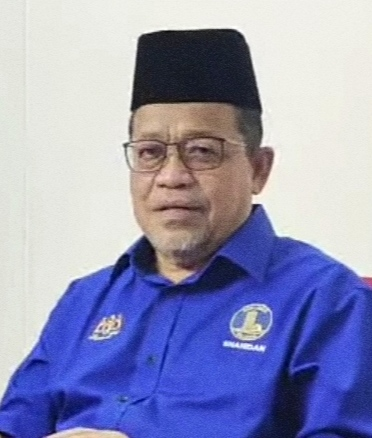
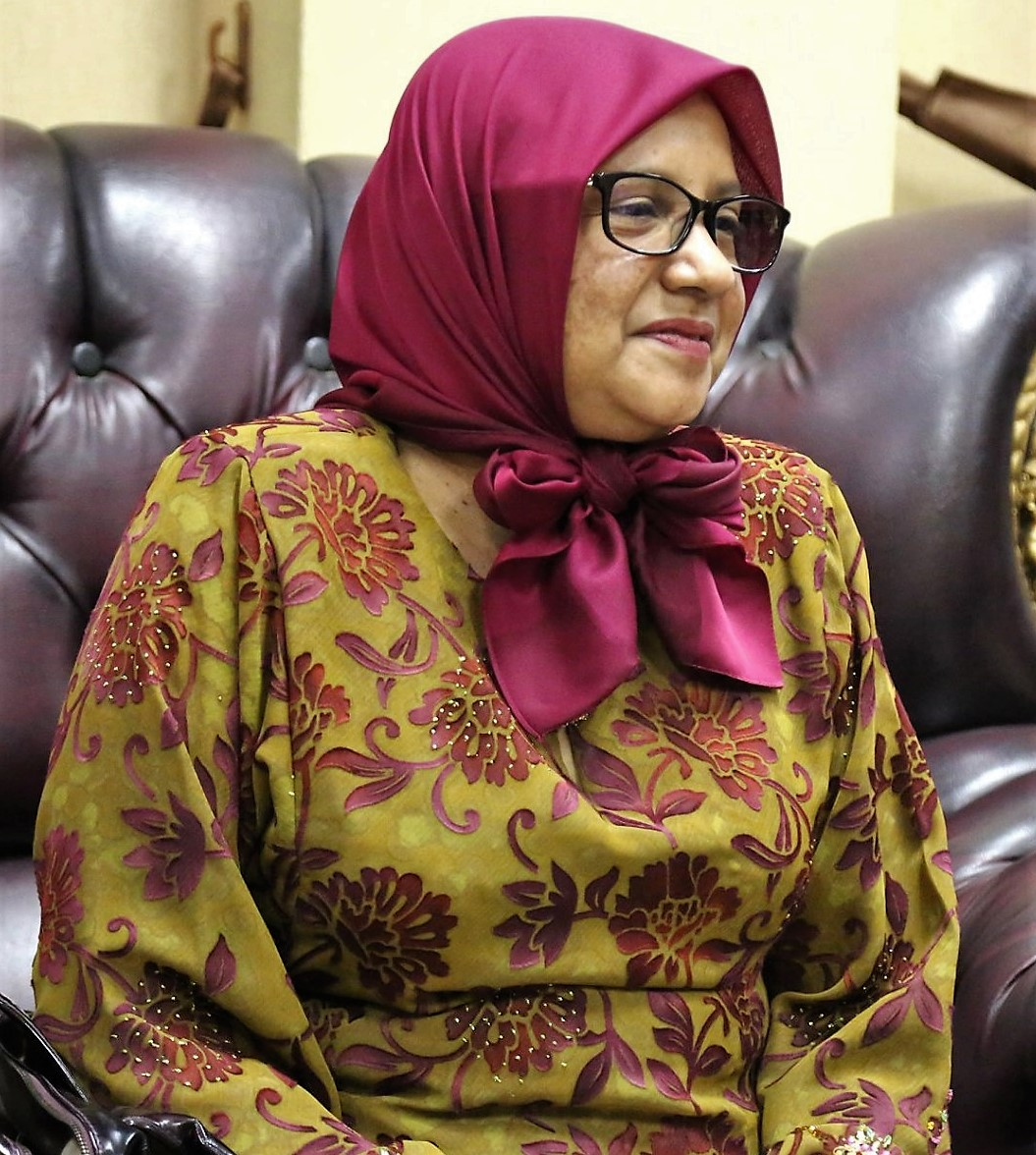
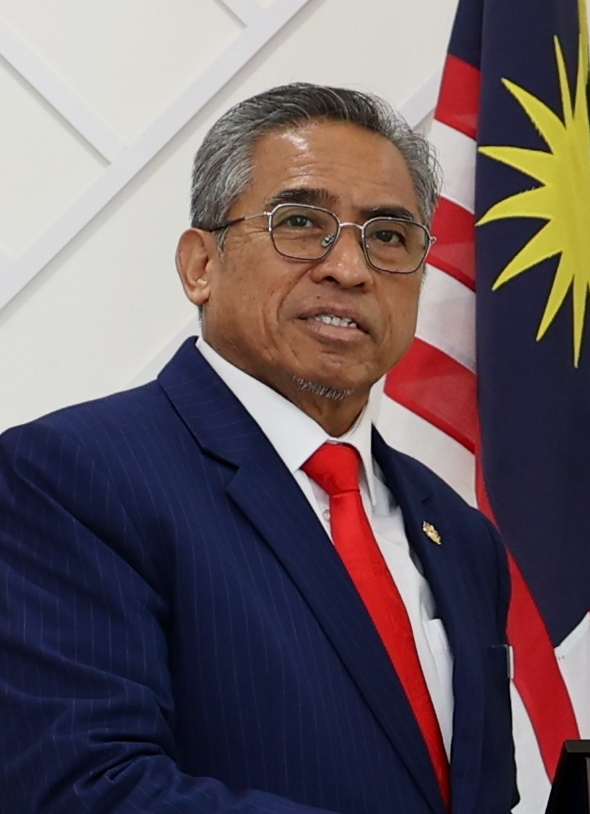
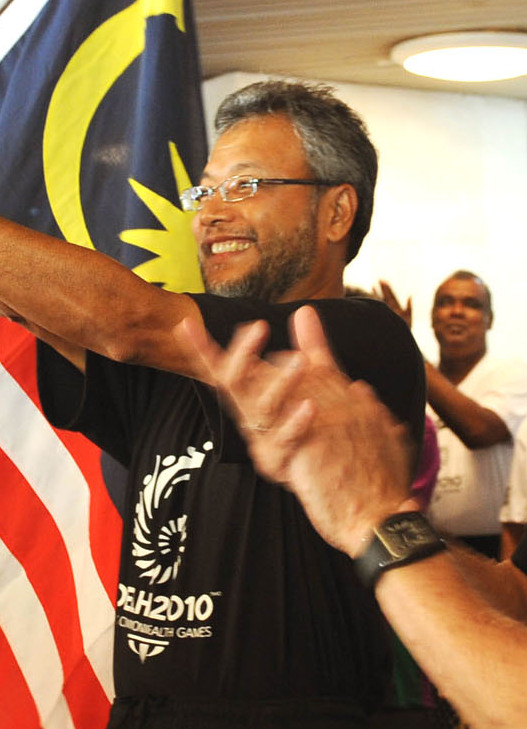
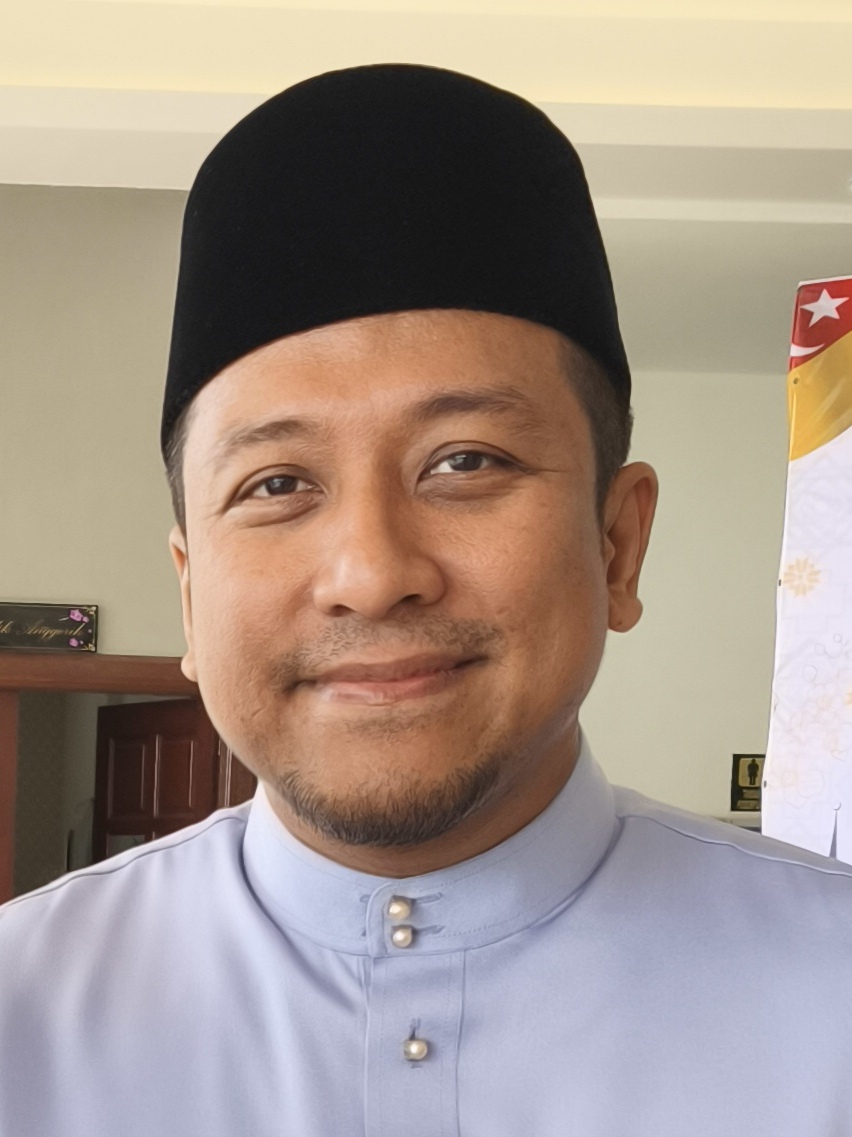
From left to right, top to bottom:
Notable officers include Abdullah Ahmad Badawi, 5th Prime Minister of Malaysia; Johari Abdul, 11th Speaker of the Dewan Rakyat; Ahmad Fuzi Abdul Razak, 8th Yang di-Pertua Negeri of Penang; Shahidan Kassim, 7th Menteri Besar of Perlis; Sarimah Akbar, 12th Ambassador of Malaysia to Sweden; Ramlan Ibrahim, Secretary-General of the Malaysian Ministry of Foreign Affairs; Shamsul Azri Abu Bakar, 16th Chief Secretary to the Government of Malaysia; Ku Jaafar Ku Shaari, 5th Secretary General of the D-8 Organization for Economic Cooperation; and Najwan Halimi, Member of the Selangor State Executive Council for the Youth, Sports and Entrepreneurship, and Disaster Management.

In Malaysia, the Administrative and Diplomatic officers (Malay: Pegawai Tadbir dan Diplomatik or PTD) are civil servants from the Management and Professional groups who hold a university degree and receive training at the National Institute of Public Administration (INTAN). The PTD's (INTAN graduates) usually become frontline workers in Malaysia, such as district officers, embassy officers, ambassadors and so on. They are tasked with formulating and implementing national policies across various ministries and agencies in Malaysia. Graduates who hold at least a bachelor's degree, must obtain a Postgraduate Diploma in Public Management (Malay: Diploma Pascasiswazah Pengurusan Awam or DPA) from INTAN before becoming an officer.

== Duties and responsibilities ==
The duties of an Administrative and Diplomatic officer as referred to in the Public Services Commission of Malaysia (SPA) website are: "Planning, formulating and implementing public policies on human and organizational resource management, financial resources, economy, regional/district/local/land administration and development, social planning and administration, international relations and foreign affairs (including foreign service), national security/resilience and information technology management."

fields of specialization for the PTD's including: Human Resources Management; Finance Management; Government and Services Management; International Relations and Foreign Affairs; Science, Technology and Environment; Housing, Urbanization, Local Government and Land Administration; Social and Community Development; Security and Defence; and Economy.

== Requirements ==
Appointment requirements to become an Administrative and Diplomatic officer:

- Graduated and hold the Bachelor's Degree with Honours recognized by the government from local higher education institutions or qualifications recognized as equivalent (starting salary: MYR 2,253.00); or
- Graduated and hold the Master's Degree recognized by the government from local higher education institutions or qualifications recognized as equivalent (starting salary: MYR 2,564.14); or
- Graduated and hold the Doctor of Philosophy recognized by the government from local higher education institutions or qualifications recognized as equivalent (starting salary: MYR 2,875.48); and
- Pass the prescribed examination to enter the Administrative and Diplomatic service;
- Attend and pass the Postgraduate Diploma in Public Management (DBA) course organized by the National Institute of Public Administration (INTAN); and
- ~~Possess a Postgraduate Diploma in Public Management from local higher education institutions or qualifications recognized as equivalent; and~~
- Candidates for appointment must have a credit in the Malay Language subject at the Sijil Pelajaran Malaysia (SPM) or a qualification recognized as equivalent by the government.

For those who want to hold this position, they must apply to the SPA and then must appear for the online examination for Administrative and Diplomatic officers.

== Examinations and tests ==
Starting in 2014, the SPA has introduced an online examination system for candidates for Administrative and Diplomatic officers. With the introduction of this online examination system, more candidates have the opportunity to sit for the examination to fill this position.

Consistent with the introduction of this system, the new question section breakdown has also been composed as follows:

1. Section A: General Knowledge
2. Section B: Problem Solving Ability
3. Section C: Psychometric Test

Candidates are allocated a certain time to answer all sections. The break time between each section is 15 minutes.

On Session 16 May 2019, the SPA has changed the Online Examination Format for Section C from the Psychometric Test to the English Comprehension Test.

== Controversies and issues ==
=== Allegations of conflict management styles ===
Studies on the PTD's conflict-handling behaviors indicate a tendency towards dominance in interpersonal conflicts. The study finds that they predominantly use a dominance style—asserting authority to resolve conflicts without seeking consensus. While effective for quick decision-making, this approach can lead to strained relationships and reduced collaboration. This approach may impact collaborative efforts and the overall work environment within the civil service in Malaysia.

=== Diplomatic and administrative oversight ===
An audit have revealed administrative oversights in the PTD-managed diplomatic missions. For instance, the Malaysian High Commission in New Delhi was found to have unpaid fees and staffing issues, raising concerns about the efficiency and accountability of the PTDs in managing diplomatic affairs. They revealed that premium and rental fees totaling INR 216,240.00 (MYR 11,933.00) and INR 5,406.00 (MYR 298.00) per year respectively, remain unpaid to the Indian government.

=== Allegations of operational disconnect ===
In January 2025, former Health Minister Khairy Jamaluddin criticized the PTDs for being detached from the practical realities of hospital operations, suggesting they were overly reliant on data analysis without understanding on-the-ground challenges. The Administrative and Diplomatic Officers Alumni Association (PPTD) swiftly rebutted these claims, asserting that the PTDs collaborate closely with professionals in the health sector to develop balanced and sustainable policies.

== Notable officers ==
- Abdullah Ahmad Badawi, 5th Prime Minister of Malaysia
- Johari Abdul, 11th Speaker of the Dewan Rakyat
- Ahmad Fuzi Abdul Razak, 8th Yang di-Pertua Negeri of Penang
- Shahidan Kassim, 7th Menteri Besar of Perlis
- Abu Hassan Omar, 12th Menteri Besar of Selangor
- Shamsul Azri Abu Bakar, 16th Chief Secretary to the Government of Malaysia
- Mohd Zuki Ali, 15th Chief Secretary to the Government of Malaysia
- Ismail Bakar, 14th Chief Secretary to the Government of Malaysia
- Ali Hamsa, 13th Chief Secretary to the Government of Malaysia
- Mohd Sidek Hassan, 12th Chief Secretary to the Government of Malaysia
- Ku Jaafar Ku Shaari, 5th Secretary General of the D-8 Organization for Economic Cooperation
- Sarimah Akbar, 12th Ambassador of Malaysia to Sweden
- Ahmad Badri Mohamad Zahir, Secretary-General of the Malaysian Ministry of Finance
- Ramlan Ibrahim, Secretary-General of the Malaysian Ministry of Foreign Affairs
- Muhammad Shahrul Ikram Yaakob, Secretary-General of the Malaysian Ministry of Foreign Affairs
- Bung Moktar Radin, Deputy Chief Minister III and Minister of Works of Sabah
- Najwan Halimi, Member of the Selangor State Executive Council for the Youth, Sports and Entrepreneurship, and Disaster Management
- Ayman Rashdan Wong, winner of the Anugerah Buku Negara 2019

== See also ==
- Indian Administrative Service
- Pakistan Administrative Service
- Bangladesh Administrative Service
- United States Senior Executive Service
- Grand Corps of the French State
