= Order of the Life of the Crown of Kelantan =

Honorific order of the Sultanate of Kelantan

Order of the Life of the Crown of Kelantan Darjah Kebesaran Jiwa Mahkota Kelantan Yang Amat Mulia

Awarded by Sultan of Kelantan
- Type: Order
- Established: 21 July 1925
- Royal house: House of Long Yunus
- Ribbon: Light sky blue
- Status: Currently constituted
- Founder: Ismail of Kelantan
- Sovereign: Muhammad V of Kelantan
- Grades: Knight Grand Commander; Knight Commander; Companion
- Post-nominals: SJMK; DJMK; JMK

Precedence
- Next (higher): Order of the Crown of Kelantan
- Next (lower): Order of the Noble Crown of Kelantan
- (2006-present) (1925-2005); Ribbon bar of the order

The Most Illustrious Order of the Life of the Crown of Kelantan or the Star of Ismail (Malay: Darjah Kebesaran Jiwa Mahkota Kelantan Yang Amat Mulia or Bintang Al-Ismaili) is an honorific order of the Sultanate of Kelantan.

It is awarded in three classes:

- Knight Grand Commander (Seri Paduka-S.J.M.K.),
- Knight Commander (Dato' Paduka-D.J.M.K.) and
- Companion (Taulan-J.M.K.).

Male and female recipients of these royal awards, the Seri Paduka Jiwa Mahkota Kelantan (SJMK) and the Dato' Paduka Jiwa Mahkota Kelantan (DJMK) are entitled to be addressed with the honorary title “Dato'” and their female spouse “Datin”. There is no accompanying title for their male spouse.

== Notable recipients ==
=== Knight Grand Commander (SJMK) ===
- 1959: Lee Kong Chian
- 1965: ~~Tengku Abdul Aziz~~ (revoked on 8 February 2014)
- 1984: Harris Salleh
- 1986: Tengku Sulaiman Shah
- 1989: Eusoffe Abdoolcader
- 1989: Othman Saat
- 1991: Eric Chia
- 1995: Nik Abdul Aziz Nik Mat
- 1998: Mohtar Abdullah
- 1999: Tengku Mohamad Rizam
- 2000: Mustapa Mohamed
- 2002: Rais Yatim
- 2003: Abdul Gani Patail
- 2003: Abdul Kadir Sheikh Fadzir
- 2003: Ahmad Fairuz Abdul Halim
- 2003: Samsudin Osman
- 2003: Tengku Adnan Tengku Mansor
- 2004: Jamaluddin Jarjis
- 2004: Mohd Khalil Yaakob
- 2004: Nor Mohamed Yakcop
- 2005: Mohd Bakri Omar
- 2005: Rosmah Mansor
- 2005: Vincent Tan
- 2006: Shafie Salleh
- 2007: Mohd Anwar Mohd Nor
- 2007: Musa Hassan
- 2009: Ahmad Zahid Hamidi
- 2010: Ahmad Yakob
- 2010: Mohd Sidek Hassan
- 2011: Khalid Abu Bakar
- 2012: Ali Hamsa
- 2015: Mohd Amar Abdullah
- 2016: ~~Abdul Azeez Abdul Rahim~~ (revoked on 2 April 2019)
- 2016: Muhammad Ibrahim
- 2018: Mukhriz Mahathir
- 2018: Takiyuddin Hassan
- 2018: Mohd Nassuruddin Daud
- 2018: Raja Shah Zurin
- 2022: Tengku Zafrul Aziz
- 2022: Tuan Ibrahim Tuan Man
- 2024: Farhash Wafa Salvador
- 2025: Shamsul Azri Abu Bakar
- 2026: Ramanan Ramakrishnan
- 2026: Saifuddin Nasution Ismail
- Unknown: Nik Ahmad Kamil
- Unknown: Abdullah Ahmad

=== Knight Commander (DJMK) ===
- 1962: Tengku Abdul Aziz
- 1964: Benjamin Sheares
- 1986: Senu Abdul Rahman
- 1986: Eric Chia
- 2003: ~~Ibrahim Ali~~ (revoked on 13 October 2010)
- 2003: Awang Adek Hussin
- 2003: Anuar Tan Abdullah
- 2004: ~~Wan Abdul Rahim Wan Abdullah~~ (revoked on 6 February 2018)
- 2006: ~~Husam Musa~~ (revoked on 6 February 2018)
- 2006: Mohamad Fatmi Che Salleh
- 2006: Mohamad Norza Zakaria
- 2007: Takiyuddin Hassan
- 2009: Tengku Putra
- 2009: Mohd Amar Abdullah
- 2010: Md Anizam Ab Rahman
- 2010: Mohd Nassuruddin Daud
- 2011: Abdul Fattah Mahmood
- 2011: Mohamed Nazri Abdul Aziz
- 2011: Sh Mohmed Puzi Sh Ali
- 2012: Mohamed Fadzli Hassan
- 2012: Che Abdullah Mat Nawi
- 2013: Abdullah Ya'kub
- 2013: Hanifa Ahmad
- 2013: Mohd Adhan Kechik
- 2016: Ramli Mamat
- 2017: Ahmad Jazlan Yaakub
- 2017: Mohamad Awang
- 2018: Azami Mohd Nor
- 2019: Mumtaz Md Nawi
- 2019: Siti Zailah Mohd Yusoff
- 2019: Xavier Jayakumar Arulanandam
- 2022: Adeeba Kamarulzaman
- 2022: Izani Husin
- 2022: Shamsul Anuar Nasarah
- 2023: Mohd Apandi Mohamad
- 2024: Tuan Saripuddin Tuan Ismail
- 2024: Wan Roslan Wan Hamat
- 2025: Rohani Ibrahim
- 2025: Mohamed Farid Mohamed Zawawi
- 2025: Mohd Syahbuddin Hashim
- Unknown: Murad Ahmad
- Unknown: Abdul Aziz Zain
- Unknown: ~~Mohd Annuar Zaini~~ (revoked on 1 March 2019)

=== Companion (JMK) ===
- 2005: Husam Musa
- 2006: Md Anizam Ab Rahman
- 2006: Mohd Amar Abdullah
- 2007: Mohd Nassuruddin Daud
- 2011: Siti Zailah Mohd Yusoff
- 2010: Mohamed Fadzli Hassan
- 2010: Che Abdullah Mat Nawi
- 2016: Luqman Abdullah
- 2016: Mumtaz Md Nawi
- 2018: Izani Husin
- 2018: Mohd Syahbuddin Hashim
- 2019: Ahmad Marzuk Shaary
- 2019: Md Yusnan Yusof
- 2022: Abdul Latiff Abdul Rahman
- 2022: Tuan Saripuddin Tuan Ismail
- 2022: Wan Roslan Wan Hamat
- 2025: Ahmad Fadhli Shaari
- 2025: Wan Ahmad Fayhsal
- 2026: Hilmi Abdullah

== See also ==
- Orders, decorations, and medals of the Malaysian states and federal territories
- Orders, decorations, and medals of Kelantan
- List of post-nominal letters (Kelantan)
