= Ramlan Ibrahim =

Malaysian civil servant

Yang Berbahagia Dato' Seri Ramlan Ibrahim PJN DGPN SSAP DSDK

Secretary-General of the Ministry of Foreign Affairs (Malaysia)
- In office 1 January 2017 – 5 January 2019
- Monarchs: Muhammad V Abdullah
- Prime Minister: Najib Razak; Mahathir Mohamad
- Minister: Anifah Aman; Saifuddin Abdullah
- Deputy Minister: Reezal Merican Naina Merican; Marzuki Yahya
- Preceded by: Othman Hashim
- Succeeded by: Muhammad Shahrul Ikram Yaakob

Personal details
- Born: 6 January 1957 (age 69) Penang, Federation of Malaya (now Malaysia)
- Spouse: Hafipah Mohd Shah

Ramlan bin Ibrahim (born 6 January 1957) is a current member of the Election Commission of Malaysia and a former Secretary-General of the Ministry of Foreign Affairs of Malaysia. He is the 15th person to hold the post since the establishment of the Ministry in 1956.

A career diplomat, Ramlan was previously the country's Permanent Representative to the United Nations in New York. His stint in New York coincided with Malaysia's membership to the United Nations Security Council, as one of its ten non-permanent members.

== Early life and education ==
Ramlan was born in Penang, a state in Northern Malaysia, in 1957.

He obtained a bachelor's degree from the National University of Malaysia (UKM), and a Masters in International Relations from Webster University.

== Career ==
Ramlan entered the Administrative and Diplomatic Service of Malaysia in 1983. His first posting was as Second Secretary to the Embassy of Malaysia in Jakarta in 1988. Two years later, he was reassigned to the Embassy of Malaysia in the Netherlands, but as First Secretary. In 1994, Ramlan returned to the headquarters and was assigned to the Europe Division. It was not long before the Ministry sent him on another posting, this time as the chargé d'affaires ad interim in the Embassy of Malaysia in Zagreb, Croatia.

He returned three years later, in 2000, to become the Principal Assistant Secretary at the Division of South East Asia. The following year, Ramlan was appointed as Deputy High Commissioner to Singapore. His first posting as an ambassador was to Bosnia and Herzegovina in 2004. When he returned to the Ministry in mid-2006, he was appointed as the Undersecretary of the Americas Division before becoming Undersecretary of the South East Asia Division in quick succession.

In 2009, Ramlan was again appointed Ambassador of Malaysia, this time to the Republic of Korea. In Korea, he headed the Bilateral Department, the second-highest post in the Malaysian foreign service, in 2013. In April 2015, Ramlan was appointed as Malaysia's Permanent Representative to the United Nations in New York. Malaysia was at the time a member of the Security Council, thus Ramlan was also Malaysia's Permanent Representative in the Council, the highest decision-making organ of the United Nations.

=== At the UNSC ===
Ramlan's first task upon taking up the post in New York in April 2015 was to preside over the UN Security Council. Ramlan's arrival in New York as Permanent Representative of Malaysia to the United Nations coincided with Malaysia's first tenure as President of the Security Council in April 2015. Ramlan was also Chair of the Security Council's Working Group on Children and Armed Conflict and held open debates on the subject on 18 June 2015 and 2 August 2016. UN Resolution 2225 on 'children and armed conflict' was adopted with a unanimous vote during Malaysia's Chairmanship in 2015.

In the closing days of Malaysia's tenure at the UN Security Council in December 2016, a draft resolution on the issue of Palestine was circulated. The draft condemned the illegal Israeli settlement in the occupied territories and was tabled by Egypt, on behalf of other sponsors. The draft resolution was put to a vote on 23 December 2016. The UN Security Council adopted the resolution, which is now known as United Nations Security Council Resolution 2334, with a vote of 14 in favour and one abstention (the United States). The adoption of Resolution 2334 is seen as a victory for Malaysia, and particularly for Ramlan, who was supported by Malaysian Prime Minister Najib Razak and Minister Anifah Aman, who supported a non-veto resolution.

=== As MFA Secretary General ===
Ramlan was appointed as Secretary General of the Ministry of Foreign Affairs on 1 January 2017 and received his letter of appointment from the Chief Secretary to the Government, Tan Sri Dr Ali Hamsa. Barely two months into his stewardship, Ramlan's was tasked with spearheading the negotiations to free the 11 Malaysians held captive by the Pyongyang regime because of the death of a North Korean citizen, rumored to be Kim Jong-nam, the estranged brother of Kim Jong-il.

== Awards and honours ==
- Malaysia :
  - Commander of the Order of Meritorious Service (PJN) – Datuk (2017)
- Kedah :
  - Knight Companion of the Order of Loyalty to the Royal House of Kedah (DSDK) – Dato' (2008)
- Pahang :
  - Knight Grand Companion of the Order of Sultan Ahmad Shah of Pahang (SSAP) – Dato' Sri (2017)
- Penang :
  - Commander of the Order of the Defender of State (DGPN) – Dato' Seri (2017)

=== Foreign honours ===
- South Korea :
  - Honorary Citizen of Seoul (2012)
