= List of recipients of the Order of Sultan Mizan Zainal Abidin of Terengganu =

This is a list of recipients of the Order of Sultan Mizan Zainal Abidin of Terengganu.

== Supreme Class of the Order of Sultan Mizan Zainal Abidin of Terengganu (SUMZ) ==

- Mizan Zainal Abidin of Terengganu, 26 May 2005
- Abdullah Ahmad Badawi
- Mohd Khalil Yaakob

== Knight Grand Companion of the Order of Sultan Mizan Zainal Abidin of Terengganu (SSMZ) ==

- Mizan Zainal Abidin of Terengganu, 6 July 2001
- Sultanah Nur Zahirah
- Idris Jusoh
- Ahmad Said
- Ahmad Razif Abdul Rahman
- Ali Hamsa
- Ahmad Samsuri Mokhtar
- Mohammad Zuki Ali
