= Retirement Fund (Incorporated) =

Malaysian civil service pension management body

Kumpulan Wang Persaraan (Diperbadankan) Retirement Fund (Incorporated)
- Type: Statutory body
- Industry: Pension fund; Investment management
- Predecessor: Pensions Trust Fund (Kumpulan Wang Amanah Pencen)
- Founded: 1 March 2007; 19 years ago
- Headquarters: Integra Tower, The Intermark; Jalan Tun Razak, Kuala Lumpur, Malaysia
- Key people: Ahmad Badri Mohd Zahir (Chairman); Tuan Syed Hamadah Othman (CEO)
- AUM: ▲RM140.8 billion (2017)
- Website: www.kwap.gov.my/en/

Retirement Fund (Incorporated) (Malay: Kumpulan Wang Persaraan (Diperbadankan); KWAP) is a statutory body which manages the pension scheme for Malaysia's public employees. KWAP is the investment manager of the Retirement Fund, which is applied towards financing the government's pension liability, and is responsible for the administration and payment of pension to public sector retirees. KWAP is one of three main bodies in Malaysia's pension system, the others being the Employees Provident Fund (for private sector employees) and Armed Forces Fund Board (for military personnel). It is also regarded as one of Malaysia's government-linked investment companies (GLICs).

== History ==
Prior to KWAP's establishment, the public pension fund in Malaysia was managed by the Pensions Trust Fund (Malay: Kumpulan Wang Amanah Pencen), whose operations fell under the responsibility of the Accountant General. The Pensions Trust Fund grew from an initial government grant of RM500 million in 1991 to RM42 billion in 2007. In March 2007, KWAP was established under the Retirement Fund Act and assumed all powers, functions, activities, assets and liabilities of the Pensions Trust Fund. In November 2015, KWAP was appointed as agent to the government for overall pension management and payment operation, taking over this role from the Public Services Department's Post Pension Services Division.

In August 2018, KWAP acquires two properties in the United Kingdom from IP Investment Management (HK) Ltd and Maven Capital Partners for RM280 million in order to boost its presence in foreign markets. The fund launches its online app called MyPesara in November 2018 to help retirees to planning their future effectively. In August 2022, KWAP launches the Teras 5 that based on its five main cores as part of its long-term plan to strengthening its basis in facing the future challenges.

== Operations ==
The fund receives contributions from the Federal Government of Malaysia, statutory bodies and local authorities. The contributions are invested by the fund in a mix of equities, bonds, property, private equity and infrastructure, with the investment returns used to finance the government's pension liabilities. The fund's Investment Panel determines the fund's investment policy and asset allocation strategy.

KWAP also operates the Pension Services Department (PeSD) in Cyberjaya which processes payment of pensions and other benefits to public pensioners.
