= Shamsul Azri Abu Bakar =

Malaysian public servant

Yang Berbahagia Tan Sri Shamsul Azri Abu Bakar PMN SJMK SPMS SPMP SPCM SSAP SSMZ DPPN DGSM DIMP AMS PPT
- شمس الأزرى أبو بكر
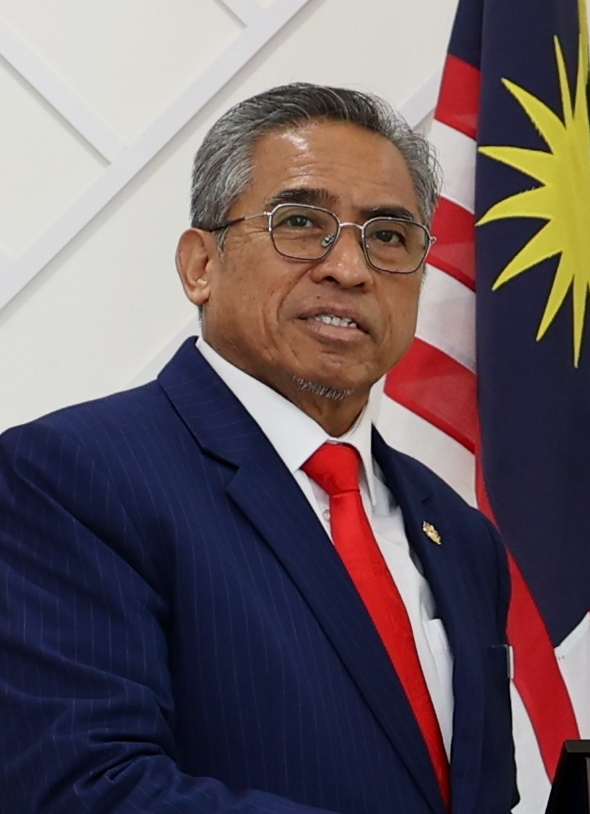
- Shamsul Azri in 2025

16th Chief Secretary to the Government of Malaysia
- Incumbent
- Assumed office 12 August 2024
- Monarch: Ibrahim
- Prime Minister: Anwar Ibrahim
- Preceded by: Mohd Zuki Ali

Personal details
- Born: Shamsul Azri bin Abu Bakar; 27 January 1969 (age 57) Pekan, Pahang, Malaysia
- Spouse: Maheran Jamil
- Education: University of Tulsa (BBA); National Institute of Public Administration (DPA)
- Profession: Public servant

Shamsul Azri bin Abu Bakar (Jawi: شمس الأزرى بن أبو بكر; born 27 January 1969) is a Malaysian public servant who is the 16th and current Chief Secretary to the Government since August 2024.

== Early life and education ==
Shamsul Azri was born in Pekan, Pahang, Malaysia. He holds a bachelor's degree in Business Administration (BBA) from the University of Tulsa, Oklahoma. He also attended the National Institute of Public Administration (INTAN) to train as an Administrative and Diplomatic Officer (PTD). He has also received exposure from several international institutions, including the University of Cambridge and the European Institute of Business Administration (INSEAD).

== Civil service ==
Shamsul Azri's career includes positions at the Ministry of Finance, the Public Service Department, and various state government administrations. On 1 November 2015, he served as Deputy Secretary of the Division of Development and Administration Sector, Compensation and Management Policy Division in the Ministry of Finance. On 20 February 2020, He served as Division Secretary of the Remuneration and Management Policy Division in the Ministry of Finance.

On 22 March 2021, he served as Division Secretary of the Government Investment Company Division in the Ministry of Finance. On 4 October 2022, he was appointed the Director General of the Public-Private Partnership Unit (UKAS) in the Prime Minister's Department.

On 7 August 2024, Shamsul Azri was appointed the Chief Secretary to the Government of Malaysia with the consent of Sultan Ibrahim, Yang di-Pertuan Agong upon the advice of Prime Minister Anwar Ibrahim. He officially assumed the role on 12 August, replacing Mohd Zuki Ali, whose contract ended on 10 August. Mohd Zuki served as Chief Secretary from 2019 and was reappointed on a contract basis in 2022 for an additional two years.

== Honours ==
=== Honours of Malaysia ===
- Malaysia
  - Commander of the Order of the Defender of the Realm (PMN) – Tan Sri (2024)
  - Recipient of the 17th Yang di-Pertuan Agong Installation Medal
- Kelantan
  - Knight Grand Commander of the Order of the Life of the Crown of Kelantan (SJMK) – Dato' (2025)
- Malacca
  - Grand Commander of the Exalted Order of Malacca (DGSM) – Datuk Seri (2024)
- Pahang
  - Knight Grand Companion of the Order of Sultan Ahmad Shah of Pahang (SSAP) – Dato' Sri (2024)
  - Knight Companion of the Order of the Crown of Pahang (DIMP) – Dato' (2010)
- Penang
  - Knight Commander of the Order of the Defender of State (DPPN) – Dato' Seri (2025)
- Perak
  - Knight Grand Commander of the Order of Cura Si Manja Kini (SPCM) – Dato' Seri (2025)
- Perlis
  - Knight Grand Commander of the Order of the Crown of Perlis (SPMP) – Dato' Seri (2026)
  - Recipient of Tuanku Syed Sirajuddin Jamalullail Silver Jubilee Medal (2025)
- Selangor
  - Knight Grand Commander of the Order of the Crown of Selangor (SPMS) – Dato' Seri (2025)
  - Member of the Order of the Crown of Selangor (AMS) (2009)
  - Recipient of the Distinguished Conduct Medal (PPT)
- Terengganu
  - Knight Grand Companion of the Order of Sultan Mizan Zainal Abidin of Terengganu (SSMZ) – Dato' Seri (2025)
  - Recipient of Sultan Mizan Zainal Abidin Silver Jubilee Medal (2023)

Political offices
Preceded by Mohd Zuki Ali	Chief Secretary to the Government; 2024–present	Incumbent
