= Civil service in Malaysia =

The civil service in Malaysia is pivotal around Article 132 of the Constitution of Malaysia which stipulates that the public services shall consist of the Federal and State General Public Service, the Joint Public Services, the Education Service, the Judiciary and the Legal Service and the Armed Forces.

For all intents and purpose, Statutory Bodies and the Local Authorities are also considered as parts of the Public Services. This is because both these autonomous bodies resemble the Public Services in many respects since they adopt the procedures of the Public Services pertaining to appointments, terms and conditions of service and the remuneration system. Besides that, their officers and staff also receive pension and other retirement benefits similar to the employees in the Public Services.

However, with the implementation of the separation concept under the Remuneration System which became effective on 1 January 1993, several public sector agencies were given the freedom to institute their own policies and procedures. These agencies, whose activities were akin to that of businesses and were in good financial stead, were allowed to determine their own policies and procedures pertaining to appointments, terms and conditions of service.

== History ==
The current civil service was created in the 1950s but trace its lineage to the 1700s:

- Malayan Public Service of the British East India Company, from 1771 to 1874
- Federated Malay States Civil Service, from 1874 to 1941
- Malay Administrative Service, from 1910 to 1957

After Malaysia's independence in 1957, the current service was created.

== Public agencies ==
Public agencies are agencies in public service at the Federal, State and the Local Government levels. Federal agencies consist of Ministries, Federal Departments and Federal Statutory Bodies. Each ministry is headed by a Minister and assisted by deputy minister(s) and the chief executive officer that is known as the Secretary General. The Prime Minister's Department is also a ministry. Typically there will be a number of departments and possibly one or more statutory bodies as well under a ministry. Head of departments are given the title Director General.

Head of statutory bodies are called chairman while the chief executive officer who is a civil servant is called the General Manager. There are statutory bodies headed by the executive chairman who also functions as the General Manager as is the case in the Employees Provident Fund.

State Agencies consist of state departments, state statutory bodies and local governments (City, Municipal and District Councils).

The term Public Services does not include special institutions such as the Judiciary, Public Services Commissions, the Election Commission and like institutions whose members are appointed by the King. Nevertheless, the organisations providing support or secretarial services to these institutions are public agencies whose officers and staff are from the Public Services. The Public Services also excludes off-budget agencies which are formed under the Companies Act or the Society Act and do not follow policies and procedures of personnel management in the public sector.

== Central agencies ==
Central Agency in Malaysia is important, as it assists the government in formulating policies, co-ordinating, controlling and monitoring the various development programs and projects. Among the main responsibilities (objectives) of the Central Agency are:

- To formulate public policies with regard to economic planning of the state.
- To formulate and provide the basis and needs of various government agencies and departments, such as, formulating and providing public servants and positions,
- To provide the basis for public budget (or public funding) for the various development programs and projects.
- To provide necessary services that is required by the Operation Agency.
- To ensure that public policy are implemented and executed accordingly by the Operation Agency, and the smooth running of various development programs and projects.

As such, the co-ordination and control by the Central Agency, tend to encompass a few crucial aspects or functions:

- Examine and scrutinise the estimate annual budget of state.
- Examine public servant services scheme, public servant grades, and positions.
- Examine and scrutinise the annual economic development programs and projects of state, and also the Five-yearly economic policy of state.
- Enforce financial regulations and public services.
- Coordinate the formulation of public policy, programs, and projects, and also its implementation.
- To analyse and investigate public complaints and feedback, with regard to the various governmental programs and projects.

Central Agencies are also Federal agencies responsible for formulating the national financial and economic policies, the public sector human resource policies, and the monitoring and supervising the implementation of these policies. The central agencies are:

- The Treasury
- The Economic Planning Unit (EPU)
- The Implementation Coordination Unit (ICU JPM)
- The Malaysian Administrative Modernisation and Management Planning Unit (MAMPU)
- Malaysia Public Service Department

== Civil service and ethnic relations in Malaysia ==
In 2010 Senator Datuk T. Murugiah, a Deputy Minister in the Prime Minister's Department, denied in a parliamentary press conference that the government was only focusing on hiring ethnic-Malay civil servants. “People always criticise us for hiring only those from one race to work in the service but it is not true. The percentage of non-Bumiputeras hired by the Public Service Commission has increased in the past few years,” he stated. According to Murugiah 58.2% of the 1,559 Chinese applicants interviewed as of 15 June 2010 have been hired and that the number of Chinese employed in 2010 shows an increase of 9 percent over 2008. 1,833 ethnic Indians were interviewed as of 15 June 2010 and 42.7% of them hired. In 2008 6,106 ethnic Indians were interviewed of which 38.8 percent were hired.“There is no bias there. All races are given opportunity for top management positions. There is no quota system,” added Murugiah.

== Criticisms and reforms ==
=== Bureaucracy ===
Malaysia’s bureaucracy is one of the biggest in the world, with 1.7 million civil servants to a population of 32 million, a ratio of 4.5% compared with Singapore’s ratio of 1.5% civil servants to total population, Hong Kong’s 2.3% and Taiwan’s ratio of 2.3%. Some critics have called for the civil service to be trimmed, arguing that the COVID-19 pandemic proved that the Government was able to function just as well at a lower capacity.

A consequence of the size of the civil service is the burgeoning cost of civil service emoluments. Civil service emoluments, including the pension and gratuities bill, which accounts for nearly half of the federal government’s annual revenue. In the past, there have been minimal efforts to reform civil service emoluments as the civil service is typically seen as a vote bank for the government of the day.

Nonetheless, the Congress of Unions of Employees in the Public and Civil Services (Cuepacs) contended the size of country's civil service is still ideal since it includes personnel from the armed forces, police, education and health personnel, which are typically excluded from other countries' definition of public sector.

=== Diversity ===
A 2023 report found that ethnic Malays, comprising 57 per cent of Malaysian citizens, account for 78 per cent of federal government staff — and 80 per cent of top decision-making positions

This has led to assertions that a highly unrepresentative bureaucracy may run counter against efforts to strengthen national unity and also against the popular support for the government itself. According to another observer, the Malay dominance in the military and police serves as the ultimate deterrent to any challenge to the status quo and is intended to demonstrate to the Malay community that political power lies firmly in the hands of "the Malays". Some have posited that the reason civil service is centered on Malays due to the patronage policy practised by the government.

Over the years, opponents have challenged the government to prove that the civil service hires on merit. Some have posited that the reason civil service is centered on Malays due to the patronage policy practised by the government. Opponents are still unhappy at the administrative reforms in the civil service, and warrant that more change, such as, the inclusion of the Non-Malays and Bumiputeras of Sabah and Sarawak, and even ethnic Orang Asli, should all be given a fair chance in the civil service.

== Appointing authorities ==
Each of the services have their respective appointing authorities as follows:-

Service / Agency	Appointing authority
Federal Public Services	Public Services Commission
Education Service	Education Service Commission
Judicial and Legal Service	Judicial and Legal Service Commission
Police Service	Police Service Commission
Armed Forces	Armed Force Council
Parliament of Malaysia	Parliament Service Commission (Beginning 1 October 2026)
Public Services in the states of Melaka, Pulau Pinang, Negeri Sembilan & Perlis	Public Services Commission
Other state public services	Respective State Public Services Commissions
Federal and state statutory bodies	Respective Board of Directors
Local governments	Respective local government

== See also ==
- Chief Secretary to the Government of Malaysia
- List of federal agencies in Malaysia
