= Samsudin Osman =

Malaysian public servant

Yang Berbahagia Tan Sri Samsudin Osman PMN PSM SJMK SPMS SSAP DPPN SPDK SUMW DGSM SPMP PNBS DHMS SMW DPMJ DPMS PGDK JSM PMP AMN

11th Chief Secretary to the Government of Malaysia
- In office 1 February 2001 – 2 September 2006
- Monarchs: Salahuddin; Sirajuddin
- Prime Minister: Mahathir Mohamad; Abdullah Ahmad Badawi
- Preceded by: Abdul Halim Ali
- Succeeded by: Mohd Sidek Hassan

9th President of the International Islamic University Malaysia
- In office 1 July 2022 – 30 June 2025
- Chancellor: Tunku Azizah Aminah Maimunah Iskandariah
- Preceded by: Mohd Daud Bakar
- Succeeded by: Abdul Rashid Hussain

Chairman of the Employees Provident Fund (Malaysia)
- In office 1 February 2007 – 30 April 2020
- Deputy: Siti Zauyah Md Desa
- Chief Executive Officer: Tunku Alizakri Raja Muhammad Alias
- Preceded by: Abdul Halim Ali
- Succeeded by: Ahmad Badri Mohd Zahir

Personal details
- Born: Samsudin bin Osman; 3 March 1947 (age 79) Johor Bahru, Johor, Malayan Union (now Malaysia)
- Education: English College Johore Bahru; Royal Military College
- Alma mater: University of Malaya BA (Hons); Pennsylvania State University MPA

Samsudin bin Osman (born 3 March 1947) is a Malaysian former public servant who served the Malaysian Government from 1969 to 2006. His last office in the public service was Chief Secretary to the Government from 1 February 2001 to 2 September 2006. He formerly served as President of the International Islamic University Malaysia and as Chairman of the Employees Provident Fund.

Prior to being Chief Secretary, Samsudin was the secretary-general for the Ministry of Domestic Trade and Consumer Affairs from 1994 and the Ministry of Home Affairs from 1996.

He obtained his Bachelor of Arts (Hons) from the University of Malaya and Master of Public Administration from Pennsylvania State University. He is also a former student of the renowned English College Johore Bahru and Royal Military College, Sungai Besi.

== Honours ==
=== Honours of Malaysia ===
- Malaysia
  - Commander of the Order of the Defender of the Realm (PMN) – Tan Sri (2001)
  - Commander of the Order of Loyalty to the Crown of Malaysia (PSM) – Tan Sri (1999)
  - Companion of the Order of Loyalty to the Crown of Malaysia (JSM) (1992)
  - Member of the Order of the Defender of the Realm (AMN) (1979)
- Federal Territory (Malaysia)
  - Grand Knight of the Order of the Territorial Crown (SUMW) – Datuk Seri Utama (2018)
  - Grand Commander of the Order of the Territorial Crown (SMW) – Datuk Seri (2008)
- Johor
  - Knight Commander of the Order of the Crown of Johor (DPMJ) – Dato' (2001)
- Kedah
  - Knight Commander of the Order of Loyalty to Sultan Abdul Halim Mu'adzam Shah (DHMS) – Dato' Paduka (2007)
- Kelantan
  - Knight Grand Commander of the Order of the Life of the Crown of Kelantan (SJMK) – Dato' (2003)
- Malacca
  - Grand Commander of the Exalted Order of Malacca (DGSM) – Datuk Seri (2002)
- Pahang
  - Knight Grand Companion of the Order of Sultan Ahmad Shah of Pahang (SSAP) – Dato’ Sri (2001)
- Penang
  - Knight Commander of the Order of the Defender of State (DPPN) – Dato' Seri (2004)
- Perak
  - Knight Grand Commander of the Order of the Perak State Crown (SPMP) – Dato' Seri (2000)
  - Commander of the Order of the Perak State Crown (PMP) (1988)
- Sabah
  - Grand Commander of the Order of Kinabalu (SPDK) – Datuk Seri Panglima (2001)
  - Commander of the Order of Kinabalu (PGDK) – Datuk (1992)
- Sarawak
  - Knight Commander of the Most Exalted Order of the Star of Sarawak (PNBS) – Dato Sri (2003)
- Selangor
  - Knight Grand Commander of the Order of the Crown of Selangor (SPMS) – Dato' Seri (2003)
  - Knight Commander of the Order of the Crown of Selangor (DPMS) – Dato' (1999)

Preceded by Abdul Halim Ali	Chief Secretary to the Government; 2001–2006	Succeeded by Mohd Sidek Hassan
