= Mohd Zuki Ali =

Malaysian public servant

Yang Berbahagia Tan Sri Dato' Seri Mohd Zuki Ali PMN PSD SPMS SPCM SSMZ SPDK DA SMW DIMP JSD AMT PPT
- محمّد ذوقي علي

15th Chief Secretary to the Government of Malaysia
- In office 1 January 2020 – 10 August 2024
- Monarchs: Abdullah (2020–2024); Ibrahim Iskandar (2024)
- Prime Minister: Mahathir Mohamad (2020); Muhyiddin Yassin (2020–2021); Ismail Sabri Yaakob (2021–2022); Anwar Ibrahim (2022–2024)
- Preceded by: Ismail Bakar
- Succeeded by: Shamsul Azri Abu Bakar

Personal details
- Born: 11 August 1962 (age 64) Kuala Terengganu, Terengganu, Federation of Malaya (now Malaysia)
- Spouse: Norizam Che Mohd Nor
- Education: National University of Malaysia (BEcon); Nanyang Technological University (MBA)
- Profession: Public servant

Mohd Zuki bin Ali (Jawi: محمّد ذوقي بن علي; born 11 August 1962) is a Malaysian civil servant who served as the 15th Chief Secretary to the Government from 2020 to 2024.

After retiring from public service, he was appointed as the new Chairman of the Employees' Provident Fund starting on 1 September 2024 replacing Ahmad Badri Mohd Zahir.

== Education ==
An alumnus of National University of Malaysia (UKM), Mohd Zuki received his Bachelor of Economics in 1986 and achieved a Postgraduate Diploma in Public Management from the Malaysian National Institute of Public Administration (INTAN) in 1991. He then furthered his studies at Nanyang Technological University (NTU), where he obtained a Master of Business Administration (MBA) in 1999.

== Career ==
Mohd Zuki joined the federal public service from Administrative and Diplomatic Officer (PTD) corps in December 1992 as an assistant secretary at the Ministry of Finance. He then served various posts at various ministries and agencies. On 17 August 2015, Mohd Zuki Ali served as Director-General of Legal Affairs Division under Prime Minister's Department. He became Sarawak's secretary for federal affairs (a position of the civil service who is in charge ex officio of federal agencies in the East Malaysian states of Sabah and Sarawak) on 13 August 2016 and senior deputy secretary-general at the Prime Minister's Department on 1 August 2017. Prior to ascending to the top of Malaysian public service, he was transferred to the Ministry of Defence to serve as secretary-general on 18 April 2019.

== Honours ==
- Malaysia
  - Commander of the Order of the Defender of the Realm (PMN) – Tan Sri (2020)
  - Commander of the Order of Loyalty to the Royal Family of Malaysia (PSD) – Datuk (2011)
  - Companion of the Order of Loyalty to the Royal Family of Malaysia (JSD) (2007)
- Federal Territory (Malaysia)
  - Grand Commander of the Order of the Territorial Crown (SMW) – Datuk Seri (2018)
- Negeri Sembilan
  - Recipient of the Distinguished Conduct Medal (PPT) (2008)
- Pahang
  - Knight Companion of the Order of the Crown of Pahang (DIMP) – Dato' (2008)
- Perak
  - Knight Grand Commander of the Order of Cura Si Manja Kini (SPCM) – Dato' Seri (2022)
- Sabah
  - Grand Commander of the Order of Kinabalu (SPDK) – Datuk Seri Panglima (2021)
- Sarawak
  - Knight Commander of the Order of the Star of Hornbill Sarawak (DA) – Datuk Amar (2020)
  - Gold Medal of the Sarawak Independence Diamond Jubilee Medal (2024)
- Selangor
  - Knight Grand Commander of the Order of the Crown of Selangor (SPMS) – Dato' Seri (2021)
- Terengganu
  - Knight Grand Companion of the Order of Sultan Mizan Zainal Abidin of Terengganu (SSMZ) – Dato' Seri (2021)
  - Member of the Order of the Crown of Terengganu (AMT) (2005)

Political offices
Preceded by Ismail Bakar	Chief Secretary to the Government; 2020 – 2024	Succeeded by Shamsul Azri Abu Bakar
