= Sallehuddin Mohamed =

Malaysian civil servant

Yang Berbahagia Tan Sri Dato' Sri Sallehuddin Mohamed PMN SSAP SSIS PSM DHMS JMN KMN

8th Chief Secretary to the Government of Malaysia
- In office 15 June 1984 – 31 January 1990
- Monarchs: Iskandar; Azlan Shah
- Prime Minister: Mahathir Mohamad
- Preceded by: Hashim Aman
- Succeeded by: Ahmad Sarji Abdul Hamid

Personal details
- Born: 9 September 1932 (age 93) Raub, Pahang, Federated Malay States, British Malaya (now Malaysia)

Sallehuddin bin Mohamed (born 9 September 1932) was a Malaysian civil servant who served as the 8th Chief Secretary to the Government from 1984 to 1990.

== Career ==
Sallehuddin appointed as Chief Secretary to the Government on 15 June 1984, succeeding Hashim Aman, who retired at 55 years of age. After Sallehuddin left office as Chief Secretary to the Government on 31 January 1990 at the age of 58 (optional compulsory retirement), he was later appointed as new Chairman of the Employees Provident Fund Board on 26 May 1990.

== Honours ==
- Malaysia
  - Officer of the Order of the Defender of the Realm (KMN) (1970)
  - Companion of the Order of the Defender of the Realm (JMN) (1976)
  - Commander of the Order of Loyalty to the Crown of Malaysia (PSM) – Tan Sri (1982)
  - Commander of the Order of the Defender of the Realm (PMN) – Tan Sri (1985)
- Kedah
  - Knight Commander of the Order of Loyalty to Sultan Abdul Halim Mu'adzam Shah (DHMS) – Dato' Paduka (1990)
- Pahang
  - Knight Grand Companion of the Order of Sultan Ahmad Shah of Pahang (SSAP) – Dato' Sri (2009)
- Selangor
  - Knight Grand Companion of the Order of Sultan Sharafuddin Idris Shah (SSIS) – Dato' Setia (2009)

Preceded by Hashim Aman	Chief Secretary to the Government; 1984–1990	Succeeded by Ahmad Sarji Abdul Hamid
