= Ayman Rashdan Wong =

Malaysian writer and geopolitics analyzer

Ayman Rashdan Wong 艾曼·拉什丹·黄
- Born: 1988 (age 37–38); Malaysia
- Education: National University of Malaysia; University of Malaya
- Occupations: Writer government official
- Writing career
- Language: Malay; English
- Subjects: Geopolitics, current issues
- Notable awards: Anugerah Buku Negara 2019
- Website: Official website

Ayman Rashdan Wong (also writing under the name A.R.W.; born 1988) is a Malaysian writer and geopolitical analyst. He is also an Administrative and Diplomatic Officer in the Malaysian Government.

== Early life and education ==
Ayman Rashdan Wong was born and raised in a Chinese family. His family practiced traditional religion but his interest in religion led him to convert to Christianity in high school after being a Buddhist during primary school.

While in form two, he read the textbook of Islamic Education and then increased his interest in Islam. When he advanced to form three, he stopped attending church and was not baptized. He still believes in the existence of God as a theism but still faces difficulties in embracing Islam. In the month of Ramadan (August) in 2012, he stopped at the Iron Mosque and was attracted to his surroundings before converting to Islam four months later on Friday, 28 December 2012.

Ayman received his early education at Sekolah Menengah Kebangsaan Seri Selayang in 2001 and graduated in 2005. He continued his education at Sekolah Menengah Kebangsaan Darul Ehsan in 2006 and graduated in 2007. Ayman entered National University of Malaysia (UKM) in International Relations in 2008 and graduated on 2011. He is also a graduate of the University of Malaya (UM) in Defense and Strategic Studies.

== Writing ==
Ayman Rashdan is described as an influential geopolitical writer in Malaysia. His writing got the attention of the local media who took his writing as an opinion related to international affairs. In a letter from Ayman on 29 September 2019, he praised Greta Thunberg, describing her as a brave person but stressed that Greta's outspokenness did not solve any problems in environmental issues due to the gap between developed and developing countries in terms of economic production. His writings on the Uyghurs issue in China were also the focus of December 2019 when Ayman and Islamic geopolitical writer Abdul Muein Abadi exchanged views on the crisis. Harakah Daily writer Alang Ibn Shukrimun argues that Ayman and Abdul Muein each have their own opinions, with Ayman being more focused on the issue of Chinese sovereignty, the dangers of Separatism and Extremism and undermining Western media propaganda in using the conflict in Xinjiang as a weapon of cold war and Abdul Muein on the plight of Muslims who are often used by both the West and the East, exposing China's human rights abuses against the Uyghurs as well as making people aware of China's increasingly aggressive geopolitical agenda to rival the West to challenge the sovereignty of other countries.

In addition to the online writing, he is also a book writer. His book entitled Dunia Tanpa Tembok (World Without Walls) published by the conservative publication The Patriots garnered attention when it was seen being carried and read by former Prime Minister Najib Razak while outside the High Court complex. His book was also encouraged by Foreign Minister Saifuddin Abdullah during an interview on World Book and Copyright Day.

In April 2020 during the peak of COVID-19 pandemic in Malaysia. Ayman in a post on Facebook said that there is a blessing to fast during the MCO period because it will allow Muslims to appreciate Ramadan and reflect on oneself better.

== Bibliography ==
- Wong, Ayman Rashdan (2017). Dunia Tanpa Tembok (in Malay). Ampang, Kuala Lumpur: Patriots Publication. ISBN 978-967-153-940-8. OCLC 1136513895.
- Wong, Ayman Rashdan; Ibn Jawi (2018). Mencabar Teori Konspirasi (in Malay). Ampang, Kuala Lumpur: Patriots Publication. ISBN 978-967-153-944-6.
- Wong, Ayman Rashdan (2019). Dunia Tanpa Tembok II (in Malay). Ampang, Kuala Lumpur: Patriots Publication. ISBN 978-967-165-280-0. OCLC 1136513874.
- Wong, Ayman Rashdan (2020). Dunia Tanpa Tembok III (in Malay). Ampang, Kuala Lumpur: Patriots Publishing. ISBN 978-967-243-700-0.
- Wong, Ayman Rashdan (15 July 2020). 벽이 없는 세계:국경 없는 세계에 필요한 지정학 전략 (in Korean). Translated by Jung, Sang-chun. Busan, South Korea: Sanjini. ISBN 978-896-545-662-9.
