= Lee Kim Yew =

Malaysian entrepreneur

Yang Berbahagia Tan Sri Dato' Seri Lee Kim Yew PSM SSDK DPPN DHMS DSSA
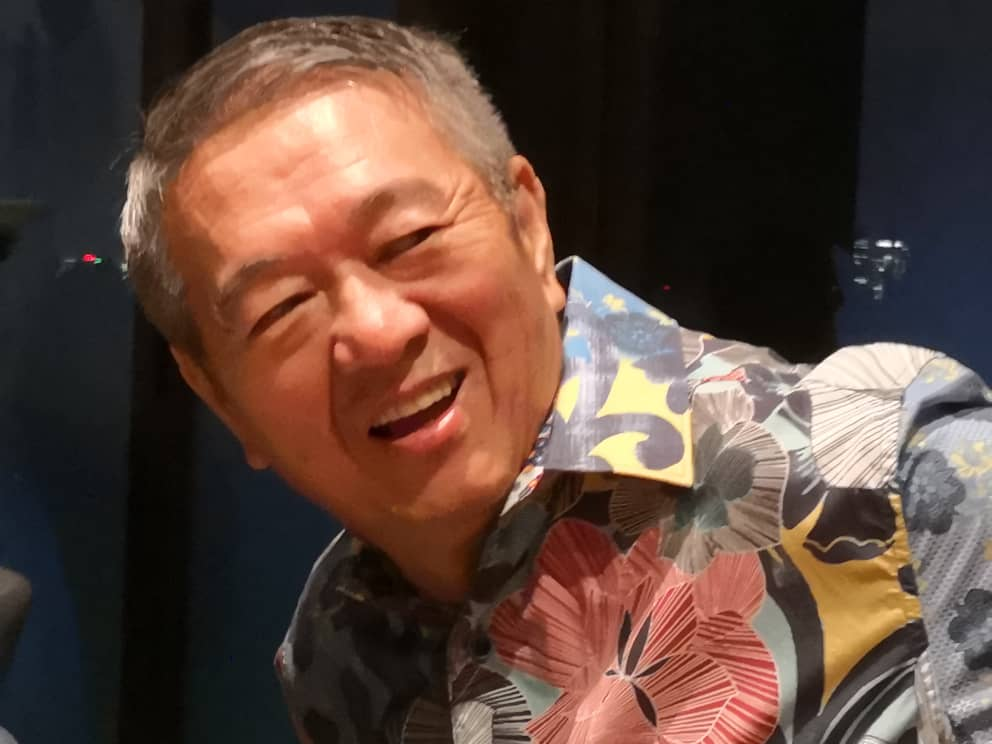
- Born: 19 August 1955 (age 70); Johor, Malaysia
- Occupations: Entrepreneur, investor, philanthropist
- Years active: 1955 - present
- Spouse: Puan Sri Tan Bee Hong
- Website: https://leekimyew.com

Lee Kim Yew (born 19 August 1955) is a Malaysian entrepreneur, investor and philanthropist. He was the founder and chairman of Country Heights Holdings Berhad and was among the first to venture into property development with country-living concept. Under Country Heights Holdings Berhad, he established projects such as the Palace of the Golden Horses, The Mines and GHHS Healthcare.

In early 2023, the Shah Alam High Court declared him to be bankrupt. Subsequently, he stepped down as the chairman of Country Heights Holdings Berhad, and has since become an advisor for the group.

== Career ==
In 1985, Lee started off in property development. He has worked on various sites in North Borneo, Mauritius, Johannesburg and London. Some of his earliest work included turning an abandoned rubber estate into residences and converting an open-cast mining land into the Mines Wellness City.

Other projects that he has undertaken include the Borneo Highlands Resort and the Hornbill Golf & Jungle Club in Sarawak which won the CNBC Award for Best Golf Development Malaysia in 2008.

== Business ventures ==
Founded by Lee, Country Heights Holdings Berhad is an investment holding company listed on the Main Market of Kuala Lumpur Stock Exchange that operates in real estate development and construction, real estate investing and management, hotel, and golf resort. Country Heights also provides educational, computer, leisure, marketing, health screening, exhibition centre and event management services. Projects under Country Heights include the Mines Resort and Golf Club, Country Heights Damansara, Country Heights Kajang, Borneo Highlands, Palace of the Golden Horses, Excel Exhibition Centre (London) and Pecanwood Golf and Country Club (South Africa).

As a Corporate Social Responsibility initiative, Lee expanded his business into the healthcare and wellness industry in 2001 with the establishment of Golden Horses Health Sanctuary (GHHS) Healthcare, a preventive health screening centre within a resort.

In 2021, Lee founded Golden Horse Digital Investment Bank Ltd (GHDIB). GHDIB is a licensed and regulated digital investment bank.

== Other ventures ==
In 2009, Lee and fellow Malaysian entrepreneur Michael Yeoh founded the World Chinese Economic Forum, which was later rebranded into World Chinese Economic Summit. In 2021, it was rebranded again into the Global Chinese Economic & Technology Summit. The summit is an annual international forum that promotes business linkages, connectivity, shared prosperity and sustainability, with the purpose to enhance connections between China, the world and global Chinese diasporas.

Lee is also the patron of the Malaysia Association for Advancement of Functional and Interdisciplinary Medicine (MAAFIM), a national association that facilitates the growth of science, research, education, and continued professional development.

== Philanthropy ==
During Malaysia's Movement Control Order (MCO) in March 2020, Lee initiated Bantu-bantu Malaysia, a non-profit social welfare initiative. The initiative supplied masks and personal protection equipment (PPEs), food baskets and other essentials to the mid to low-income groups.

During the beginning of MCO, the Palace of the Golden Horses initiated a culinary programme for orphans, old folks, single mothers, foreign employees and students within a 5-kilometer radius of the hotel.

== Personal life ==
Lee plays golf. One of his business premises, The Mines Resort & Golf Club, has held golf tournaments and events, such as the 2017 Southeast Asian Games golf competitions, 1999 World Cup of Golf and others

Lee is a Buddhist and frequently holds exhibitions at the Palace of the Golden Horses to celebrate the Guan Yin goddess as well as showcase his collection of Guan Yin statues

Lee is a believer in Chinese philosophy. He practices Confucianism and I-Ching.

== Honours ==
- Malaysia :
  - Commander of the Order of Loyalty to the Crown of Malaysia (PSM) – Tan Sri (1997)
- Kedah :
  - Knight Commander of the Order of Loyalty to Sultan Abdul Halim Mu'adzam Shah (DHMS) – Dato' Paduka (2008)
  - Knight Grand Companion of the Order of Loyalty to the Royal House of Kedah (SSDK) – Dato' Seri (2010)
- Penang :
  - Knight Commander of the Order of the Defender of State (DPPN) – Dato' Seri (2012)
- Selangor :
  - Knight Companion of the Order of Sultan Salahuddin Abdul Aziz Shah (DSSA) – Dato' (1994)
