= Ismail Bakar =

14th chief secretary to the government of Malaysia

Yang Berbahagia Tan Sri Dr. Ismail Bakar PMN SSAP SMW DPSM
- إسماعيل بن حاج بكر

14th Chief Secretary to the Government of Malaysia
- In office 29 August 2018 – 31 December 2019
- Monarchs: Muhammad V Abdullah
- Prime Minister: Mahathir Mohamad
- Preceded by: Ali Hamsa
- Succeeded by: Mohd Zuki Ali

Secretary-General of Treasury (Malaysia)
- In office 12 June 2018 – 28 August 2018
- Monarch: Muhammad V
- Prime Minister: Mahathir Mohamad
- Minister: Lim Guan Eng
- Deputy Minister: Amiruddin Hamzah
- Preceded by: Mohd Irwan Serigar Abdullah
- Succeeded by: Ahmad Badri Mohd Zahir

Secretary-General of Ministry of Agriculture and Agro-based Industry (Malaysia)
- In office 16 December 2015 – 11 June 2018
- Monarchs: Abdul Halim; Muhammad V
- Prime Minister: Najib Razak
- Minister: Ahmad Shabery Cheek
- Deputy Minister: Nogeh Gumbek
- Preceded by: Mohd Arif Abdul Rahman
- Succeeded by: Mohd Sallehhuddin Hassan

Secretary-General of Ministry of Transport (Malaysia)
- In office 18 November 2014 – 15 December 2015
- Monarch: Abdul Halim
- Prime Minister: Najib Razak
- Minister: Hishammuddin Hussein (Acting); Liow Tiong Lai
- Deputy Minister: Aziz Kaprawi
- Preceded by: Long See Wool
- Succeeded by: Saripuddin Kasim

Personal details
- Born: Ismail bin Bakar; 19 January 1960 (age 66) Batu Pahat, Johor, Federation of Malaya (now Malaysia)
- Citizenship: Malaysian
- Education: University of Malaya (BEc.); University of Hull (MBA, Phd)
- Website: Official website

Ismail bin Haji Bakar (Jawi: إسماعيل بن حاج بكر; born 19 January 1960) is the 14th Chief Secretary to the Government of Malaysia from 29 August 2018 until 31 December 2019.

== Education background ==
Ismail holds a Bachelor of Economics (Hons) degree from University of Malaya and a Master of Business Administration degree and a doctorate from the University of Hull, United Kingdom.

== Career ==
Ismail joined the Administrative and Diplomatic Service (PTD) as an Assistant Secretary at the Federal Treasury, Ministry of Finance in July 1983. He had served as budget director at the National Budget Office of the Ministry of Finance and senior advisor at the World Bank headquarters in Washington DC, United States. On 18 November 2014, He served as Secretary-General of Ministry of Transport. On 16 December 2015, he served as Secretary-General of Ministry of Agriculture and Agro-based Industry.

On 12 June 2018, he served as Secretary-General of Treasury to 28 August 2018. On 29 August 2018, he appointed as 14th Chief Secretary to the Government of Malaysia.

== Honours ==
- Malaysia
  - Commander of the Order of the Defender of the Realm (PMN) – Tan Sri (2019)
- Federal Territory (Malaysia)
  - Grand Commander of the Order of the Territorial Crown (SMW) – Datuk Seri (2016)
- Malacca
  - Companion Class II of the Exalted Order of Malacca (DPSM) – Datuk (2012)
- Pahang
  - Knight Grand Companion of the Order of Sultan Ahmad Shah of Pahang (SSAP) – Dato' Sri (2015)

Political offices
Preceded by Ali Hamsa	Chief Secretary to the Government; 2018-2019	Succeeded by Mohd Zuki Ali
