= Eric Chia =

Malaysian businessman

Yang Berbahagia Tan Sri Eric Chia PSM SJMK SSMT SPMT DJMK
- Died: 24 June 2008; Sungai Petani
- Other name: Tan Sri Eric Chia Eng Hock
- Occupation: Businessman

Eric Chia

Chinese name
- Traditional Chinese: 謝英福
- Simplified Chinese: 谢英福
- Hanyu Pinyin: Xiè Yīngfú
- Jyutping: Ze6 Jing1 Fuk1
- Hokkien POJ: Chiā Eng-hok
- Tâi-lô: Tsiā Ing-hok

Tan Sri Eric Chia Eng Hock (simplified Chinese: 谢英福; traditional Chinese: 謝英福; pinyin: Xiè Yīngfú; Jyutping: Ze6 Jing1 Fuk1; Pe̍h-ōe-jī: Chiā Eng-hok) was a prominent Malaysian businessman. He died of a heart attack in Sungai Petani, Kedah, aged 74.

== Eric Chia and Lim Guan Eng ==
On 11 April 1996, Lim Guan Eng had lodged, at the Sentul police headquarters, a police report titled "First Report On Financial Malpractices, Abuse Of Power, Corruption And Fraud in Perwaja Terengganu Sdn Bhd (Perwaja).”

On 2 January 2002, Chia filed a defamation suit against Lim, claiming that Lim had pictured him as corrupt and not qualified to serve the company. In his statement of claim he said the report had severely damaged his reputation as a well-known businessman and sought general and aggravated damages and other relief deemed fit by the court.

On 1 March 2002, Lim entered his statement of defence stating that he relied on qualified privilege.

On 22 April 2009, Jega Kumar & Associates filed a notice of discontinuance of Chia's suit.

On 27 April 2009, almost a year after Chia died, High Court Deputy Registrar, Norazlin Othman, in chambers, granted the application by counsel for the late Tan Sri Eric Chia Eng Hock to withdraw a defamation suit against DAP secretary-general Lim Guan Eng.

== Honour ==
=== Honour of Malaysia ===
- Malaysia
  - Commander of the Order of Loyalty to the Crown of Malaysia (P.S.M.) – Tan Sri (1989)
- Kelantan
  - Knight Commander of the Order of the Life of the Crown of Kelantan (D.J.M.K.) – Dato' (1986)
  - Knight Grand Commander of the Order of the Life of the Crown of Kelantan (S.J.M.K.) – Dato' (1991)
- Terengganu
  - Knight Grand Commander of the Order of the Crown of Terengganu (S.P.M.T.) – Dato' (1990)
  - Member Grand Companion of the Order of Sultan Mahmud I of Terengganu (S.S.M.T.) – Dato' Seri (1991)
