= Ahmad Sarji Abdul Hamid =

Malaysian civil servant (1938–2021)

Yang Amat Berbahagia Tun Ahmad Sarji Abdul Hamid SSM PMN SIMP SSMT SPDK SSSA SPMT DGSM SPMP SPNS DPCM PNBS JMN SMP PJK

9th Chief Secretary to the Government of Malaysia
- In office 1 February 1990 – 16 September 1996
- Monarchs: Azlan Shah; Ja'afar
- Prime Minister: Mahathir Mohamad
- Preceded by: Sallehuddin Mohamed
- Succeeded by: Abdul Halim Ali

Group Chairman of Permodalan Nasional Berhad
- In office 17 October 1996 – 31 July 2016
- Preceded by: Ismail Mohamed Ali
- Succeeded by: Abdul Wahid Omar

Personal details
- Born: Ahmad Sarji bin Abdul Hamid; 16 September 1938 Kampung Batu Tiga, Jalan Temoh, Tapah, Perak, Federated Malay States, British Malaya (now Malaysia)
- Died: 28 August 2021 (aged 82) Kuala Lumpur, Malaysia
- Resting place: Raudhatul Sakinah Bukit Kiara 2 Muslim Cemetery, Kuala Lumpur
- Spouse: Sagiyah Salikin (m. 1962)
- Children: 5
- Parents: Abdul Hamid Mohd Aroop (deceased) (father); Mahani Sidek (deceased) (mother)
- Education: University of Malaya; Institute of Social Studies, The Hague; Harvard University

Tun Ahmad Sarji bin Abdul Hamid (16 September 1938 – 28 August 2021) was a Malaysian civil servant who served as the 9th Chief Secretary to the Government from 1990 to 1996.

== Background and education ==
Ahmad Sarji bin Abdul Hamid was born in Tapah, Perak on 16 September 1938. He was educated at the University of Malaya, the Institute of Social Studies, The Hague and Harvard University.

== Chief Secretary to the Government of Malaysia (1990—1996) ==
On 21 July 1995, Ahmad Sarji announced the restructuring of divisions within the Education Ministry to provide for six new departments - tertiary education; private education; pre-school, primary and secondary education; special education; moral and spiritual education; and technical education.

== Personal life ==
He married Sagiyah Salikin in December 1962. They had five children.

== Death ==
On 28 August 2021, Sarji died, aged 82, from COVID-19 complications at the Hospital Canselor Tuanku Muhriz (HCTM), Universiti Kebangsaan Malaysia (UKM) in Cheras, amid the COVID-19 pandemic in Malaysia. He was earlier confirmed to be COVID-19 positive and was later admitted for treatment at the HCTM's intensive care unit (ICU) since 3 August. He was buried at the Raudhatul Sakinah Bukit Kiara 2 Muslim Cemetery in Kuala Lumpur.

== Honours ==
=== Honours of Malaysia ===
- Malaysia
  - Companion of the Order of the Defender of the Realm (JMN) (1975)
  - Commander of the Order of the Defender of the Realm (PMN) – Tan Sri (1990)
  - Grand Commander of the Order of Loyalty to the Crown of Malaysia (SSM) – Tun (2008)
- Perak
  - Knight Commander of the Order of Cura Si Manja Kini (DPCM) – Dato' (1985)
  - Knight Grand Commander of the Order of the Perak State Crown (SPMP) – Dato' Seri (1990)
- Pahang
  - Grand Knight of the Order of the Crown of Pahang (SIMP) – formerly Dato', now Dato' Indera (1990)
- Selangor
  - Knight Grand Companion of the Order of Sultan Salahuddin Abdul Aziz Shah (SSSA) – Dato' Seri (1992)
- Sarawak
  - Knight Commander of the Most Exalted Order of the Star of Sarawak (PNBS) – Dato Sri (1993)
- Malacca
  - Grand Commander of the Exalted Order of Malacca (DGSM) – Datuk Seri (1994)
- Terengganu
  - Knight Grand Commander of the Order of the Crown of Terengganu (SPMT) – Dato' (1994)
  - Member Grand Companion of the Order of Sultan Mahmud I of Terengganu (SSMT) – Dato' Seri (1995)
- Negeri Sembilan
  - Recipient of the Meritorious Service Medal (PJK) (1966)
  - Knight Grand Commander of the Order of Loyalty to Negeri Sembilan (SPNS) – Dato' Seri Utama (1995)
- Sabah
  - Grand Commander of the Order of Kinabalu (SPDK) – Datuk Seri Panglima (1996)
- Perlis
  - Companion of the Order of the Crown of Perlis (SMP) (1977)

== See also ==
- List of deaths due to COVID-19 - notable individual deaths

Preceded by Sallehuddin Mohamed	Chief Secretary to the Government; 1990–1996	Succeeded by Abdul Halim Ali
