= Order of Loyalty to Sultan Abdul Halim Mu'adzam Shah =

The Illustrious Order of Loyalty to Sultan 'Abdu'l Halim Mu'adzam Shah Darjah Yang Mulia Sri Setia Sultan 'Abdu'l Halim Mu'adzam Shah

Awarded by the Sultan of Kedah
- Type: Order of chivalry
- Status: Obsolete since 2017
- Founder: Sultan Abdul Halim Mu'adzam Shah
- Grand Master: Sultan Sallehuddin
- Grades: Grand Commander (SHMS); Commander (DHMS); Companion; Star (BMS)
- Post-nominals: S.H.M.S; D.H.M.S.; S.M.S.; B.M.S.

Statistics
- First induction: 1983
- Last induction: 2017

Precedence
- Next (higher): State of Kedah Star of Gallantry
- Next (lower): Glorious Order of the Crown of Kedah
- Equivalent: Order of Loyalty to Sultan Sallehuddin of Kedah
- – Ribbon bars

The Illustrious Order of Loyalty to Sultan 'Abdu'l Halim Mu'azzam Shah (Bahasa Melayu: Darjah Yang Mulia Sri Setia Sultan 'Abdu'l Halim Mu'azzam Shah) is an honorific order of the Sultanate of Kedah.

== History ==
It was founded by Sultan Abdul Halim of Kedah on 15 July 1983 in three classes. A further and upper class was added in 2008 : Grand Commander or Darjah Seri Setia Sultan 'Abdu'l Halim Mu'azzam Shah – SHMS.

== Classes ==
It is awarded in four classes:

- Grand Commander or Darjah Seri Setia Sultan 'Abdu'l Halim Mu'azzam Shah – SHMS
  - The male titular has right to the prefix Dato' Seri Diraja and his wife, to the prefix Datin Seri Diraja
- Commander or Datuk Sri Paduka Sultan 'Abdu'l Halim Mu'azzam Shah – DHMS
  - The male titular has right to the prefix Dato' Paduka' and his wife, to the prefix Datin Paduka
- Companion or Setia Sultan 'Abdu'l Halim Mu'azzam Shah – SMS
- Star or Bintang Setia Sultan 'Abdu'l Halim Mu'azzam Shah – BMS

Ribbon
SHMS	DHMS	SMS	BMS

== Award conditions ==
- Knight Commander or Datuk Sri Paduka – DHMS
  The Order is conferred on those in high positions who have performed meritorious services to the State and Nation. Its recipients are dubbed with the title, "Dato' Paduka"

== Insignia ==
- Grand Commander (SHMS). The insignia is composed of a collar, a badge hanging from a sash and a breast star (Photo).
- Commander (DHMS). The insignia is composed of a badge hanging from a sash and a breast star (Photo).
- Companion (SMS)
  The insignia is composed of a badge hanging from a collar sash for a male titular (Photo) and from a breast knot for a female titular (Photo).
- Star (BMS). The insignia is composed of a badge hanging from a ribbon (Photo).

== Recipients ==
=== Grand Commander (S.H.M.S.) ===
- 2008: Sultan Abdul Halim (Founder)
- 2008: Tunku Sallehuddin (later Sultan Sallehuddin)
- 2008: Tunku Abdul Hamid Thani
- 2008: Tunku Soraya
- 2008: Mahdzir Khalid
- 2010: Osman Aroff
- 2014: Muhyiddin Yassin
- 2017: Tengku Maliha Tengku Ariff (later Sultanah Maliha)
- 2017: Ahmad Bashah Md Hanipah

=== Commander (D.H.M.S.) ===
- 1983: Osman Aroff
- 1983: Mohd Ghazali Mohd Seth
- 1988: Abdullah Ismail
- 1988: Ahmad Zainol Abidin
- 1988: Daim Zainuddin
- 1988: Shaari Mohd Daud
- 1990: Mohd Hanif Omar
- 1990: Sallehuddin Mohamed
- 1991: Mohamed Hashim Mohd Ali
- 1995: Ahmad Basri Mohd Akil
- 1995: Ismail Omar
- 1996: Abdul Rahman Ibrahim
- 1996: Syed Mansor Syed Kassim Barakbah
- 1997: Halim Ali
- 1997: Meechai Nugoolgit (Honorary)
- 1997: Khir Johari
- 1997: Morihiko Hiramatsu (Honorary)
- 1997: Shafie Abdullah
- 1997: Ting Phek Khing
- 1997: Tunku Abdul Aziz
- 1998: Mohd Saad Endut
- 1998: Omar Mohamed A Binladin (Honorary)
- 1999: Sallehuddin Mohamed
- 1999: Mohd Hanif Omar
- 1999: Abdul Hamid Othman
- 2000: Mohd Zahidi Zainuddin
- 2001: Ismail Shafie
- 2002: Abdul Kadir Sheikh Fadzir
- 2003: Abdul Halil Mutalib
- 2003: Sheikh Hasbullah Abdul Halim
- 2004: Badruddin Amiruldin
- 2005: Mohd Bakri Omar
- 2006: Abdul Aziz Zainal
- 2006: Abu Bakar Taib
- 2006: Ahmad Bashah Md Hanipah
- 2006: Azizan Ariffin
- 2006: Ilyas Din
- 2007: Nor Mohamed Yakcop
- 2007: Mohd Anwar Mohd Nor
- 2007: Samsudin Osman
- 2007: Khalid Abdullah
- 2007: Azahari Md. Taib
- 2007: William Chek Lin Kwai
- 2008: Mohd Sidek Hassan
- 2008: Syed Unan Mashri Syed Abdullah
- 2008: Kua Sian Kooi
- 2008: Lee Kim Yew
- 2008: Rahmat Abu Bakar
- 2008: Beh Heng Seong
- 2008: Ghazali Ibrahim
- 2008: Md Rozai Shafian
- 2011: Syeikh Muhamad Baderudin Ahmad
- 2011: Rasli Basir
- 2011: Zulkifeli Mohd Zin
- 2011: Ismee Ismail
- 2012: Zulkifli Zainal Abidin
- 2012: Khalid Abu Bakar
- 2012: Lim Kok Wing
- 2013: Mukhriz Mahathir
- 2013: Rodzali Daud
- 2014: Mohd Puat Mohd Ali
- 2014: Syed Ismail Syed Azizan
- 2014: Fng Ah Seng
- 2015: Ali Hamsa
- 2017: Bakar Din
- 2017: Abdul Azeez Abdul Rahim

== See also ==
- Orders, decorations, and medals of the Malaysian states and federal territories#Kedah
- Orders, decorations, and medals of Kedah
- List of post-nominal letters (Kedah)
