= List of ambassadors of Malaysia to Sweden =

Ambassador of Malaysia to Sweden
- Incumbent; Sarimah Akbar since 4 October 2024
- Style: Her Excellency
- Seat: Stockholm, Sweden
- Appointer: Yang di-Pertuan Agong
- Inaugural holder: Dali Mahmud Hashim
- Formation: 1986
- Website: www.kln.gov.my/web/swe_stockholm/home

The ambassador of Malaysia to the Kingdom of Sweden is the head of Malaysia's diplomatic mission to Sweden. The position has the rank and status of an ambassador extraordinary and plenipotentiary and is based in the Embassy of Malaysia, Stockholm.

== List of heads of mission ==
=== Ambassadors to Sweden ===
Ambassador	Term start	Term end
Dali Mahmud Hashim	1986	31 May 1988
Looi Check Hun	13 August 1988	9 August 1990
Yahya Baba	7 October 1990	6 February 1995
Choo Siew Kioh	5 February 1995	28 July 1998
Syeed Sultan Seni Pakir	1 August 1998	22 February 2003
Jasmi Md Yusoff	21 March 2003	25 March 2008
Kamarudin Mustafa	8 December 2008	5 June 2010
Badruddin Ab. Rahman	3 September 2010	9 September 2015
Norlin Othman	18 January 2016	8 October 2018
Nur Ashikin Mohd Taib	7 February 2019	22 January 2023
Hafizah Abdullah	11 April 2023	20 May 2024
Sarimah Akbar	4 October 2024	Incumbent

== See also ==
- Malaysia–Sweden relations
