= Chief Secretary to the Government of Malaysia =

Chief Secretary

- Ketua Setiausaha Negara كتوا ستياءوسها نڬارا
- Coat of arms of Malaysia

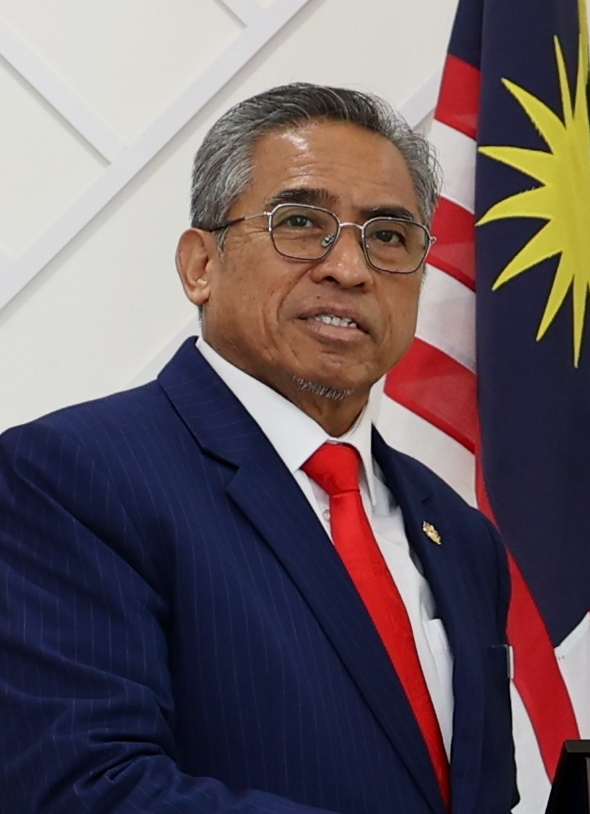
- Incumbent; Shamsul Azri Abu Bakar since 12 August 2024
- Prime Minister's Department
- Style: Yang Berbahagia
- Abbreviation: KSN
- Member of: Cabinet
- Reports to: Prime Minister
- Seat: Level 4 East, Perdana Putra, Putrajaya
- Nominator: Prime Minister
- Appointer: Yang di-Pertuan Agong on the advice of Prime Minister
- Inaugural holder: Abdul Aziz Majid
- Formation: 1 August 1957; 69 years ago
- Salary: MYR 23,577 monthly
- Website: www.ksn.gov.my

The chief secretary to the government (Malay: Ketua Setiausaha Negara; Jawi: كتوا ستياءوسها نڬارا) is the most senior officer in the Malaysian civil service, secretary to the Cabinet of Malaysia and secretary-general of the Prime Minister's Department.

== History ==
The title of "Chief Secretary to the Government" in Malaysia dates back to the Federated Malay States. In 1911, it replaced the office of resident-general as head of the British colonial administration. The inaugural chief secretary was Edward Lewis Brockman. After 1936, the administrative powers of chief secretary was transferred to the British high commissioner.

== Appointment ==
The appointment of the chief secretary to the government is made under Article 144(3) of the Federal Constitution, where it needs to be approved by His Majesty Yang di-Pertuan Agong, on the certificate of the Public Service Commission with the advice of the prime minister. Most chief secretaries are administrative and diplomatic officers (PTD) and must obtain postgraduate diplomas in public management (DPA) from the National Institute of Public Administration (INTAN).

== Role ==
The chief secretary to the government is the head of the civil service of Malaysia and the highest-ranking civil servant in the Federal Government of Malaysia. He attends Cabinet meetings as its secretary and monitors the implementation of its policies. He also heads the large Prime Minister's Department, which is in charge of, among others, supporting the Prime Minister, administration of the civil service, state protocol and Islamic affairs.

In addition, the chief secretary chairs the meetings of ministry secretaries-general and meetings of department directors-general.

== List of chief secretaries ==
The following is the list of chief secretaries:

#	Image	Chief Secretary to the Government	Term of office			Prime Minister
#	Image	Chief Secretary to the Government	Took office	Left office	Time in office	Prime Minister
1.		Tun; Abdul Aziz Majid (1908–1975)	1 August 1957	31 August 1964	7 years, 31 days	Tunku Abdul Rahman (1957–1970); Abdul Razak Hussein (1970–1976); Hussein Onn (1976–1981)
2.		Tan Sri Dato' Seri; Abdul Jamil Abdul Rais (1912–1994)	1 September 1964	6 November 1967	3 years, 67 days	Tunku Abdul Rahman (1957–1970); Abdul Razak Hussein (1970–1976); Hussein Onn (1976–1981)
3.		Tan Sri Dato' Seri; Tunku Mohamad Tunku Besar Burhanuddin (1912–1994)	7 November 1967	31 December 1969	2 years, 55 days	Tunku Abdul Rahman (1957–1970); Abdul Razak Hussein (1970–1976); Hussein Onn (1976–1981)
4.		Tan Sri; Abdul Kadir Shamsuddin (1920–1978)	1 January 1970	30 September 1976	6 years, 274 days	Tunku Abdul Rahman (1957–1970); Abdul Razak Hussein (1970–1976); Hussein Onn (1976–1981)
5.		Tun; Abdullah Mohd Salleh (1926–2006)	1 October 1976	31 December 1978	2 years, 92 days	Hussein Onn (1976–1981)
6.		Tun; Abdullah Ayub (1926–2018)	1 January 1979	30 November 1982	3 years, 334 days	Hussein Onn (1976–1981); Mahathir Mohamad; 1st term (1981–2003)
7.		Tan Sri Dato'; Hashim Aman (1929–2018)	1 December 1982	14 June 1984	1 year, 197 days	Mahathir Mohamad; 1st term (1981–2003)
8.		Tan Sri Dato' Paduka; Sallehuddin Mohamed (b.1932)	15 June 1984	31 January 1990	5 years, 231 days	Mahathir Mohamad; 1st term (1981–2003)
9.		Tun; Ahmad Sarji Abdul Hamid (1938–2021)	1 February 1990	16 September 1996	6 years, 229 days	Mahathir Mohamad; 1st term (1981–2003)
10.		Tan Sri; Abdul Halim Ali (b.1943)	17 September 1996	31 January 2001	4 years, 137 days	Mahathir Mohamad; 1st term (1981–2003)
11.		Tan Sri; Samsudin Osman (b.1946)	1 February 2001	2 September 2006	5 years, 214 days	Mahathir Mohamad; 1st term (1981–2003); Abdullah Ahmad Badawi (2003–2009)
12.		Tan Sri; Mohd Sidek Hassan (b.1952)	3 September 2006	23 June 2012	5 years, 295 days	Abdullah Ahmad Badawi (2003–2009); Mohd. Najib Abdul Razak (2009–2018)
13.		Tan Sri Dato' Sri Dr. Ali Hamsa (1955–2022)	24 June 2012	28 August 2018	6 years, 66 days	Mohd. Najib Abdul Razak (2009–2018); Mahathir Mohamad; 2nd term (2018–2020)
14.		Tan Sri Datuk Seri Dr. Ismail Bakar (b.1960)	29 August 2018	31 December 2019	1 year, 125 days	Mahathir Mohamad; 2nd term (2018–2020)
15.		Tan Sri Dato' Seri; Mohd Zuki Ali (b.1962)	1 January 2020	10 August 2024	4 years, 223 days	Mahathir Mohamad; 2nd term (2018–2020); Muhyiddin Yassin (2020–2021); Ismail Sabri Yaakob (2021–2022); Anwar Ibrahim (since 2022)
16.		Tan Sri; Shamsul Azri Abu Bakar (b.1969)	12 August 2024	Incumbent	2 years, 27 days	Anwar Ibrahim (since 2022)

=== Living former chief secretaries ===
Name	Term of office	Date of birth
Sallehuddin Mohamed	1984–1990	9 September 1932 (age 93)
Abdul Halim Ali	1996–2001	1 July 1943 (age 83)
Samsudin Osman	2001–2006	3 March 1946 (age 80)
Mohd Sidek Hassan	2006–2012	24 June 1952 (age 74)
Ismail Bakar	2018–2020	19 January 1960 (age 66)
Mohd Zuki Ali	2020–2024	11 August 1962 (age 64)

== See also ==
- Chief secretary
