= Hashim Aman =

Malaysian civil servant (1929–2018)

Yang Berbahagia Tan Sri Dato' Seri Utama Hashim Aman PMN SUNS SSSA PSM DCSM DPMJ DPMK DSNS JMN

7th Chief Secretary to the Government of Malaysia
- In office 1 December 1982 – 14 June 1984
- Monarchs: Ahmad Shah; Iskandar
- Prime Minister: Mahathir Mohamad
- Preceded by: Abdullah Ayub
- Succeeded by: Sallehuddin Mohamed

Personal details
- Born: 1 September 1929 Rembau, Negeri Sembilan, Federated Malay States, British Malaya (now Malaysia)
- Died: 21 May 2018 (aged 88) Kuala Lumpur, Malaysia
- Resting place: Bukit Kiara Muslim Cemetery, Kuala Lumpur
- Spouse: Zawiyah Yacob
- Education: University of Malaya
- Profession: Civil servant

Hashim bin Aman (1 September 1929 – 21 May 2018) was a Malaysian civil servant who served as the 7th Chief Secretary to the Government of Malaysia from 1982 to 1984.

== Early life and education ==
He was born on 1 September 1929 in Kampung Chembong, Rembau, Negeri Sembilan. He received his education at King George V Secondary School, Seremban, before furthering his studies at the University of Malaya, Singapore, and graduated with a Bachelor of Science degree in 1957.

== Career ==
Hashim had served in the government sector for 27 years, in various public departments and agencies, including as Secretary General of the Ministry of Health and Ministry of Defense, and as Director General of the Public Service Department before being appointed to the position of Secretary General from 1982 to 1984.

== Kelantan Emergency ==
He served as Director of the State Government of Kelantan when Kelantan was declared an emergency in late 1977. He worked with political leaders and the Kelantan administration as well as the Federation for the development and prosperity of the Kelantan state. After several month, the PAS government under the Menteri Besar has been overthrown by UMNO / Barisan Nasional after getting majority during 1978 election.

== Retirement ==
Hashim Aman retired in 1984 and a farewell ceremony was held at the Banquet Hall, Parliament House, Kuala Lumpur on 14 July 1984 with the special presence of Prime Minister Mahathir Mohamad. Upon his retirement, Hashim was appointed as the chairman of PERNAS.

== Death ==
Hashim Aman died on 21 May 2018 while receiving treatment at the Kuala Lumpur Hospital, aged 89. His funeral prayers was held at the Saidina Umar al-Khattab mosque in Bukit Damansara and he was laid to rest at Bukit Kiara Muslim Cemetery in Kuala Lumpur after Asar prayers.

== Honours ==
- Malaysia
  - Companion of the Order of the Defender of the Realm (JMN) (1973)
  - Commander of the Order of Loyalty to the Crown of Malaysia (PSM) – Tan Sri (1978)
  - Commander of the Order of the Defender of the Realm (PMN) – Tan Sri (1981)
- Negeri Sembilan
  - Knight Companion of the Order of Loyalty to Negeri Sembilan (DSNS) – Dato' (1980)
  - Principal Grand Knight of the Order of Loyalty to Negeri Sembilan (SUNS) – Dato' Seri Utama (2015)
- Selangor
  - Knight Grand Companion of the Order of Sultan Salahuddin Abdul Aziz Shah (SSSA) – Dato' Seri (1985)
- Kelantan
  - Knight Commander of the Order of the Crown of Kelantan (DPMK) – Dato' (1978)
- Johor
  - Knight Commander of the Order of the Crown of Johor (DPMJ) – Dato' (1979)
- Malacca
  - Knight Commander of the Exalted Order of Malacca (DCSM) – Datuk Wira (1983)

Preceded by Abdullah Ayub	Chief Secretary to the Government; 1982–1984	Succeeded by Sallehuddin Mohamed
