= Syed Ismail Syed Azizan =

Retired Malaysian police officer

Datuk Syed Ismail Syed Azizan
- Born: Syed Ismail bin Syed Azizan; 29 January 1954 (age 72); Federation of Malaya (now Malaysia)

Datuk Syed Ismail bin Syed Azizan (born 29 January 1954) is a retired Malaysian police officer who served as Director of Bukit Aman Commercial Crime Investigation Department.

== Police career ==
Syed Ismail joined the Police Force as an Inspector on 1 October 1977. Prior to that he worked as a bank staff first assigned to Kelantan in the Special Branch in 1978 for three and a half years and was involved with intelligence to detect communist militant activities that were still active at the time.

In 1981, he was transferred to Penang for three years in the same branch but the scope of his duties this time was focused on detecting extremist activities. He then worked in Bukit Aman Disciplinary Division (1988–1989) and Kedah Narcotics Branch (1989–1991). Then, he was promoted to Kulim District Deputy Police Chief (1992–1995) and Staff Officer of Perak Criminal Investigation Department (1995–1996).

He was later appointed Head of the International Police Unit (Interpol) Malaysia and was involved in drafting the basic training syllabus for Interpol with the Interpol Secretariat based in Lyon, France. From 2002 to 2004, he was the Deputy Head of Kuala Lumpur Criminal Investigation Department, Syed Ismail is promoted to Senior Assistant Commissioner of Police II and served as Head of Penang Investigation Department (2004–2006) and deputy director of Bukit Aman Criminal Investigation Department (2006) before becoming the Kedah Police Chief in 2007.

On 20 October 2010, he became the Director of the Bukit Aman Commercial Crime Investigation Department. He was retired on 2014.

== Honours ==
- Malaysia :
  - Companion of the Order of the Defender of the Realm (JMN) (2009)
  - Commander of the Order of Meritorious Service (PJN) – Datuk (2013)
- Kedah :
  - Member of the Order of the Crown of Kedah (AMK) (2002)
  - Knight Companion of the Order of Loyalty to the Royal House of Kedah (DSDK) – Dato' (2006)
  - Knight Commander of the Glorious Order of the Crown of Kedah (DGMK) – Dato' Wira (2010)
  - Knight Commander of the Order of Loyalty to Sultan Abdul Halim Mu'adzam Shah (DHMS) – Dato' Paduka (2014)
- Kelantan :
  - Knight Commander of the Order of the Loyalty to the Crown of Kelantan (DPSK) – Dato' (2010)
- Royal Malaysia Police :
  - Courageous Commander of The Most Gallant Police Order (PGPP) (2011)
- Pahang :
  - Grand Knight of the Order of Sultan Ahmad Shah of Pahang (SSAP) – Dato' Sri (2013)
