= Sarimah Akbar =

Malaysian diplomat

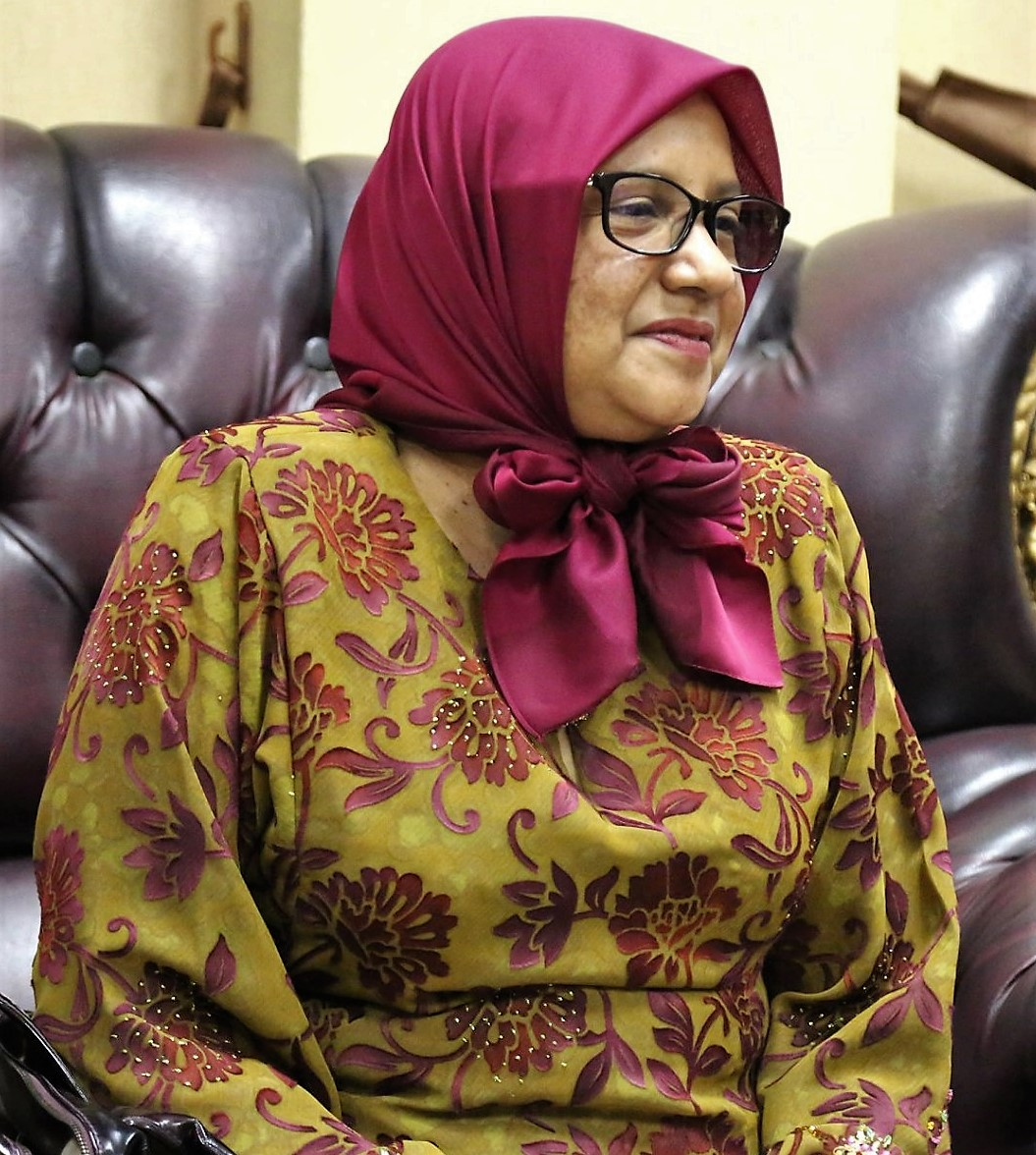
- Akbhar in 2023

Ambassador of Malaysia to Sweden with accreditation to Norway and Iceland
- In office 2024–2024
- Preceded by: Hafizah Abdullah

Ambassador of Malaysia to Timor-Lieste
- In office 2021

Personal details
- Born: 1966; Malaysia

Sarimah Akbar (born 1966) is a Malaysian diplomat who has served as the Ambassador of Malaysia to Iceland, Norway, Sweden and Timor-Leste. She has also worked at the Malaysian Embassy in Japan.

== Career ==
Akbar started her diplomatic career in 1996 in the Malaysian Ministry of Foreign Affairs as an administrative and diplomatic service officer. She was transferred to the finance department of the ministry and later moved to the East Asia department where she served until 1999, when she received her first foreign post to Malaysian Embassy in Tokyo, Japan.

From 2003 to 2004, she was assistant secretary of the Southeast Asia Department in the Malaysian Foreign Affairs Ministry. She served as a consultant at the Malaysian High Commission in London from 2009 to 2012.

From 2017, Akbar served as undersecretary at Malaysian embassies in Cambodia, Lao PDR, Myanmar and Vietnam (CLMV) and Oceania Division, before being appointed Malaysian ambassador to Timor-Leste. As Ambassador, she supported Timor-Leste's ascension to the Association of Southeast Asian Nations (ASEAN) and met with the President of Timor-Leste Taur Matan Ruak to discuss bilateral cooperation, including training officials under the Malaysia Technical Cooperation Programme (MTCP). She also met with Ambassador of the United States of America to Timor-Lieste Kevin Blackstone.

Akbar was appointed Ambassador of Malaysia to Sweden by Sultan Ibrahim Iskandar of Johor, King of Malaysia, in 2024. She presented her credentials to King Harald V in June 2025. To "boost international collaboration in innovation and technology" she has met with Lena Miranda, CEO of Sweden's Linköping Science Park. She has also promoted Malaysia as a tourist destination.

In 2025, Akbar was appointed Ambassador of Malaysia to Iceland, with continued residency in Stockholm, Sweden. She presented her credentials to President of Iceland Halla Tómasdóttir in May 2025.
