= Ahmad Badri Mohd Zahir =

Malaysian politician

Yang Berbahagia Tan Sri Dato' Sri Ahmad Badri Mohd Zahir PSM SSAP DGMK DSDK DPSM

Secretary-General of Ministry of Finance (Malaysia)
- In office 12 September 2018 – 30 April 2020
- Monarchs: Muhammad V; Abdullah
- Prime Minister: Mahathir Mohamad
- Minister: Lim Guan Eng
- Deputy Minister: Amiruddin Hamzah
- Preceded by: Ismail Bakar
- Succeeded by: Asri Hamidon

Chairman of Inland Revenue Board of Malaysia
- Incumbent
- Assumed office 12 September 2018
- Minister: Lim Guan Eng
- Deputy Minister: Amiruddin Hamzah
- Preceded by: Ismail Bakar

Chairman of Retirement Fund (Incorporated)
- Incumbent
- Assumed office 12 September 2018
- Minister: Lim Guan Eng
- Deputy Minister: Amiruddin Hamzah
- Preceded by: Ismail Bakar

Chairman of Public Sector Home Financing Board
- Incumbent
- Assumed office 12 September 2018
- Minister: Lim Guan Eng
- Deputy Minister: Amiruddin Hamzah
- Preceded by: Ismail Bakar

Personal details
- Born: Ahmad Badri bin Mohd Zahir; 1958 (age 67–68) Federation of Malaya (now Malaysia)
- Education: MARA University of Technology; National Institute of Public Administration (Malaysia); University of Hull

Ahmad Badri bin Mohd Zahir (born 1958) is the former Secretary-General of the Treasury of Malaysia. As secretary-general, Ahmad Badri also serves as Chairman of the Inland Revenue Board of Malaysia (LHDN), Retirement Fund (Incorporated) (KWAP) and the Public Sector Home Financing Board (LPPSA). He also currently is the chairman of Employees Provident Fund (EPF) and sits on the board of directors of Permodalan Nasional Berhad (PNB), Central Bank of Malaysia (BNM), Tabung Haji and the Perbadanan Insurans Deposit Malaysia (PIDM) as an ex officio member. He also serves as a non-independent non-executive director at Tenaga Nasional.

== Education ==
Ahmad Badri holds a Master of Business Administration (MBA) from the University of Hull, United Kingdom. He also obtained Diplomas in Land and Property Management from the MARA University of Technology and Public Administration from the National Institute of Public Administration (Malaysia) respectively.

== Career ==
Ahmad Badri had served in various senior posts within the Ministry of Finance (Malaysia) for more than 20 years before being appointed as its secretary-general. His last post before being promoted was as deputy secretary-general (Management), succeeding Ismail Bakar, who was chosen to ascend to the office of Chief Secretary to the Government of Malaysia.

== Honours ==
- Malaysia
  - Commander of the Order of Loyalty to the Crown of Malaysia (PSM) – Tan Sri (2019)
- Kedah
  - Knight Companion of the Order of Loyalty to the Royal House of Kedah (DSDK) – Dato' (2016)
  - Knight Commander of the Glorious Order of the Crown of Kedah (DGMK) – Dato' Wira (2019)
- Malacca
  - Companion Class II of the Exalted Order of Malacca (DPSM) – Datuk (2012)
- Pahang
  - Knight Grand Companion of the Order of Sultan Ahmad Shah of Pahang (SSAP) – Dato' Sri (2020)
