= Mohd Sidek Hassan =

Malaysian civil servant

Yang Berbahagia Tan Sri Mohd Sidek Hassan PMN PSM SJMK SPMS SPCM SSAP SUMW DGSM PNBS DHMS DIMP KMN

12th Chief Secretary to the Government of Malaysia
- In office 3 September 2006 – 24 June 2012
- Monarchs: Sirajuddin; Mizan Zainal Abidin; Abdul Halim
- Prime Minister: Abdullah Ahmad Badawi; Najib Razak
- Preceded by: Samsudin Osman
- Succeeded by: Ali Hamsa

Chairman of Petronas
- In office 1 July 2012 – 30 June 2018
- Preceded by: Tun Azizan Zainul Abidin
- Succeeded by: Ahmad Nizam Salleh

5th President of International Islamic University Malaysia
- In office 2 June 2008 – 1 June 2013
- Chancellor: Ahmad Shah
- Preceded by: Sanusi Junid
- Succeeded by: Rais Yatim

Personal details
- Born: Mohamad Sidek bin Hassan; 24 June 1951 (age 75) Cherok Paloh, Pekan, Pahang, Federation of Malaya
- Education: University of Malaya (B. Econ.); Southern New Hampshire University (MBA)
- Profession: Civil Servant

Mohd Sidek bin Hassan (born 24 June 1951) is a Malaysian former civil servant, who served in the Administrative and Diplomatic Service of the Malaysian Civil Service from 1974 to 2012. From 2006 to 2012, he served as the 12th Chief Secretary to the Government of Malaysia. Upon his retirement as Chief Secretary to the Government, he was appointed as the Chairman of Petroliam Nasional Berhad (Petronas), the national oil and gas corporation of Malaysia, a position he served from July 2012 to June 2018.

== Career ==
Sidek began his career on 15 April 1974 as an assistant director at the International Trade Division, Ministry of Trade and Industry. He has extensive working experience within the Ministry of International Trade and Industry (MITI) including postings at MITI offices in Tokyo, Sydney and Washington, D.C. He was appointed as Deputy Secretary-General (Trade) on 19 January 2001 and as the Secretary-General of the Ministry of International Trade and Industry on 24 October 2004. He was appointed as the Chief Secretary to the Government of Malaysia on 3 September 2006.

Sidek served as President of International Islamic University Malaysia (IIUM) between 2008 and 2013, and was the Pro-Chancellor of Universiti Teknologi Petronas (UTP) from 2012 to 2018.

Sidek is a former board member of Top Glove Corporation Berhad and Malayan Flour Mills Berhad and was Chairman of Malaysia Digital Economy Corporation (MDEC) from 2016 to 2018. He also served as Chairman of the Enforcement Agency Integrity Commission for a 3-year term, effective 1 July 2020.

Sidek holds a Bachelor of Economics (Honours) degree in Public Administration from University Malaya and a Master's of Business Administration (MBA) from New Hampshire College, United States of America (now Southern New Hampshire University).

He also holds an Honorary Doctorate degree in Public Administration from Universiti Tun Abdul Razak (UNITAR), an Honorary Doctorate degree in management from Universiti Putra Malaysia (UPM), an Honorary Doctorate degree in management from Universiti Teknikal Malaysia Melaka (UTeM) and an Honorary Doctorate degree in International Business from IIUM.

== Honours ==
=== Honours of Malaysia ===
- Malaysia
  - Commander of the Order of the Defender of the Realm (PMN) – Tan Sri (2007)
  - Commander of the Order of Loyalty to the Crown of Malaysia (PSM) – Tan Sri (2006)
  - Officer of the Order of the Defender of the Realm (KMN) (1994)
- Federal Territory (Malaysia)
  - Grand Knight of the Order of the Territorial Crown (SUMW) – Datuk Seri Utama (2011)
- Kedah
  - Knight Commander of the Order of Loyalty to Sultan Abdul Halim Mu'adzam Shah (DHMS) – Dato' Paduka (2008)
- Kelantan
  - Knight Grand Commander of the Order of the Life of the Crown of Kelantan (SJMK) – Dato' (2010)
- Malacca
  - Grand Commander of the Exalted Order of Malacca (DGSM) – Datuk Seri (2009)
- Pahang
  - Knight Grand Companion of the Order of Sultan Ahmad Shah of Pahang (SSAP) – Dato' Sri (2006)
  - Knight Companion of the Order of the Crown of Pahang (DIMP) – Dato' (2001)
- Perak
  - Knight Grand Commander of the Order of Cura Si Manja Kini (SPCM) – Dato' Seri (2007)
- Sarawak
  - Knight Commander of the Most Exalted Order of the Star of Sarawak (PNBS) – Dato Sri (2008)
- Selangor
  - Knight Grand Commander of the Order of the Crown of Selangor (SPMS) – Dato' Seri (2011)

=== Foreign Honours ===
- Singapore
  - Recipient of the Darjah Utama Bakti Cemerlang (DUBC) (2012)
- Japan
  - Order of the Rising Sun, Gold and Silver Star (2018)

Preceded by Samsudin Osman	Chief Secretary to the Government; 2006–2012	Succeeded by Ali Hamsa
