= National Institute of Public Administration (Malaysia) =

Training agency based in Kuala Lumpur, Malaysia

- Institut Tadbiran Awam Negara (INTAN)
- Logo of National Institute of Public Administration

Agency overview
- Formed: 1959; 67 years ago
- Jurisdiction: Government of Malaysia
- Headquarters: Public Services Commission of Malaysia, INTAN Kampus Utama Bukit Kiara, Jalan Bukit Kiara, 50480 Kuala Lumpur, Malaysia
- Motto: Memacu Transformasi Melalui Pembelajaran (Driving Transformation Through Learning)
- Agency executives: Datuk Dr. Mohd Zabri bin Yusoff, Director General; Tuan Rusli Harun, Senior Deputy Director General
- Parent agency: Public Services Commission of Malaysia (PSC)
- Website: www.intanbk.intan.my

The National Institute of Public Administration (Malay: Institut Tadbiran Awam Negara) or popularly known as INTAN is a Malaysian government agency responsible for the training of civil servants in management and administration.

== History ==
INTAN was established in 1959 as the 'Training Centre for Civil Servants', which was situated in Port Dickson. The prime objective of the centre was to train civil servants with the necessary knowledge and expertise to face the development challenges of the nation, especially after Independence. In 1963, the Training Centre was relocated to Jalan Ilmu, Petaling Jaya, close to the University of Malaya.

In 1972, the training centre was officially upgraded to an Institute, and is officially known as Institut Tadbiran Awam Negara (INTAN). This change in status coincided with the centre's increasing role and responsibilities under the National Economic Policy (NEP 1971-1990), aimed at socioeconomic development and eradicating poverty in this fledgling nation.

INTAN with the cooperation of the Public Services Department, have played pivotal roles in not only providing civil servants with the necessary facilities and training, but also scholarships, allowances, grants, and so on, for further education and career advancement (Jeong, 2007).

== Organisation ==
INTAN is headed by a Director General, and assists by eight Deputy Directors. Each of the Deputy Director headed a Center. Essentially, there are eight (8) centers under INTAN:

1. Quality Management
2. Financial Management
3. Economic Development and Policy Management
4. Senior Management and Executive Development
5. Case Studies Development and Multi-media
6. Knowledge and Graduate Studies
7. Information Technology
8. Language

These eight centers contributed positively to the relevancy of INTAN as a modern-day training center of the government, in providing the staff with the necessary knowledge, skills and expertise, in fulfilling their roles as practical public servants.

Furthermore, courses in INTAN can comprise short-period courses, such as Computer Competency courses (MS Word, Excel, Excess, Basic Internet skills, and so on), to long-term courses, such as Diploma in Public Administration, Diploma in Strategic Studies, Diploma in Foreign Policy, and other short or long courses. Other courses and trainings are provided in areas such as (Jeong, 2007):

- Management
- Social Development
- Policy Development
- Agricultural Development
- Province and Town Development
- Land Administration
- Local Government Administration
- International Relations
- International Trade and Economy
- Defense and Security
- Office Administration

Seminars, conferences, and workshops are also held from time to time, to update civil servants, which includes top civil officers, with the necessary knowledge, skills, and expertise, and also as a medium to exchange knowledge and expertise, to face the challenges and needs of modern public administration.

== Office and Branch Regions ==
=== Headquarters ===
- Bukit Kiara, Kuala Lumpur (Headquarters) – INTAN Kampus Utama Bukit Kiara

=== Branch Regions ===
- Jalan Ilmu, Petaling Jaya, close to the University of Malaya (Central region) – INTAN Jalan Elmu (IJE)
- Sungai Petani, Kedah (Northern region) – INTAN Kampus Wilayah Utara (INTURA)
- Chukai, Terengganu (East Coast region) – INTAN Kampus Wilayah Timur (INTIM)
- Kluang, Johor (Southern region) – INTAN Kampus Wilayah Selatan (IKWAS)
- Kota Samarahan, Sarawak (Sarawak region) – INTAN Kampus Sarawak (INSARA)
- Kota Kinabalu, Sabah (Sabah region) – INTAN Kampus Sabah (INSABAH)

== See also ==
- Administrative and Diplomatic Officer – One of the programs created by INTAN to provide training to civil servants from the Management and Professional groups
