= Ali Hamsa =

13th Chief Secretary to the Government of Malaysia (1955–2022)

Yang Berbahagia Tan Sri Dato' Seri Ali Hamsa PMN SPMJ SJMK SPDK SUMW SPMP SPCM SSTM SPMS SSMZ SSAP DUPN DGSM PNBS DHMS DCSM DPNS DIMP KMN AMN

13th Chief Secretary to the Government of Malaysia
- In office 24 June 2012 – 28 August 2018
- Monarchs: Abdul Halim; Muhammad V
- Prime Minister: Najib Razak; Mahathir Mohamad
- Preceded by: Mohd Sidek Hassan
- Succeeded by: Ismail Bakar

Personal details
- Born: Ali bin Hamsa; 29 August 1955 Kluang, Johor, Federation of Malaya (now Malaysia)
- Died: 21 April 2022 (aged 66) Dublin, Ireland
- Resting place: Taman Selatan Muslim Cemetery, Precinct 20, Putrajaya
- Spouse: Rohani Abdullah
- Education: University of Malaya (B. Econ.); Oklahoma State University (MS in Economics), (PhD. Environmental Economics)

Ali bin Hamsa (29 August 1955 – 21 April 2022) was a Malaysian civil servant who served as the 13th Chief Secretary to the Government of Malaysia from 24 June 2012 to 28 August 2018.

== Education ==
Ali graduated with a Bachelor of Arts (Honours) from the University of Malaya before furthering his studies at Oklahoma State University, US, where he obtained a master's degree in Economics in 1986, followed by a PhD in Environmental Sciences and Economics in 1997.

== Career ==
Ali joined the Administrative and Diplomatic Service (PTD) as an Assistant Director at the Ministry of Trade and Industry on 5 January 1981. In 1986, he was made Senior Project Manager, Economy and Public Policy Management at the National Institute of Public Administration, where he co-authored two books, namely Dasar-dasar Utama Kerajaan (1997) and Malaysia Kita (1998).

After a short stint at the Ministry of Transport in 1992, Ali furthered his studies and obtained his PhD in 1997. Upon returning from the US, he began serving at the Economic Planning Unit, Prime Minister's Department (PMD). He consecutively held the positions of Director of Disbursement Division and Deputy Director-General of the National Transformation and Advancement Programme.

On 22 April 2009, Ali was appointed the Director-General of the Public-Private Partnership (PPP) Unit, PMD, a central agency created to spearhead PPP initiatives, namely privatisation projects, private finance initiatives, corridor developments, and facilitation funds. He was sworn in as the Chief Secretary to the Government on 23 June 2012, before Prime Minister Najib Razak in Parliament.

As the Chief Secretary, Ali was the Chairman of the Malaysian Integrity Institute, Co-Chair of the Special Task Force to Facilitate Business, and Deputy Chairman of Johor Corporation. Ali was also a non-executive director of Bintulu Port Holdings Berhad, a member of the Penang Port Commission, and a member of the Board of Bumiputera Agenda Coordinating Unit.

In October 2017, Ali became the first Malaysian to receive an honorary science doctorate from the B.S. Abdur Rahman Crescent Institute of Science and Technology in Chennai, India.

== Death ==
Ali died while receiving treatment at a hospital in Dublin, Ireland on 21 April 2022 at the age of 66. He was buried at the Precinct 20 Muslim Cemetery in Putrajaya.

== Honours ==
=== Honours of Malaysia ===
- Malaysia
  - Commander of the Order of the Defender of the Realm (PMN) – Tan Sri (2013)
  - Officer of the Order of the Defender of the Realm (KMN) (2005)
  - Member of the Order of the Defender of the Realm (AMN) (2002)
- Federal Territory (Malaysia)
  - Grand Knight of the Order of the Territorial Crown (SUMW) – Datuk Seri Utama (2014)
- Johor
  - Knight Grand Commander of the Order of the Crown of Johor (SPMJ) – Dato' (2013)
- Kedah
  - Knight Commander of the Order of Loyalty to Sultan Abdul Halim Mu'adzam Shah (DHMS) – Dato' Paduka (2015)
- Kelantan
  - Knight Grand Commander of the Order of the Life of the Crown of Kelantan (SJMK) – Dato' (2012)
- Malacca
  - Grand Commander of the Exalted Order of Malacca (DGSM) – Datuk Seri (2016)
  - Knight Commander of the Exalted Order of Malacca (DCSM) – Datuk Wira (2011)
- Negeri Sembilan
  - Knight Grand Companion of the Order of Loyalty to Tuanku Muhriz (SSTM) – Dato' Seri (2013)
  - Knight Commander of the Order of Loyalty to Negeri Sembilan (DPNS) – Dato' (2011)
- Pahang
  - Knight Grand Companion of the Order of Sultan Ahmad Shah of Pahang (SSAP) – Dato' Sri (2009)
  - Knight Companion of the Order of the Crown of Pahang (DIMP) – Dato' (2006)
- Perlis
  - Knight Grand Commander of the Order of the Crown of Perlis (SPMP) – Dato' Seri (2017)
- Penang
  - Knight Grand Commander of the Order of the Defender of State (DUPN) – Dato' Seri Utama (2014)
- Perak
  - Knight Grand Commander of the Order of Cura Si Manja Kini (SPCM) – Dato' Seri (2014)
- Sabah
  - Grand Commander of the Order of Kinabalu (SPDK) – Datuk Seri Panglima (2012)
- Sarawak
  - Knight Commander of the Order of the Star of Sarawak (PNBS) – Dato Sri (2013)
- Selangor
  - Knight Grand Commander of the Order of the Crown of Selangor (SPMS) – Dato' Seri (2013)
- Terengganu
  - Knight Grand Companion of the Order of Sultan Mizan Zainal Abidin of Terengganu (SSMZ) – Dato' Seri (2012)

| Preceded by Mohd Sidek Hassan | Chief Secretary to the Government; 2012–2018 | Succeeded by Ismail Bakar |
