= Employees Provident Fund (Malaysia) =

National pension fund

Employees Provident Fund (EPF)
- Kumpulan Wang Simpanan Pekerja (KWSP)

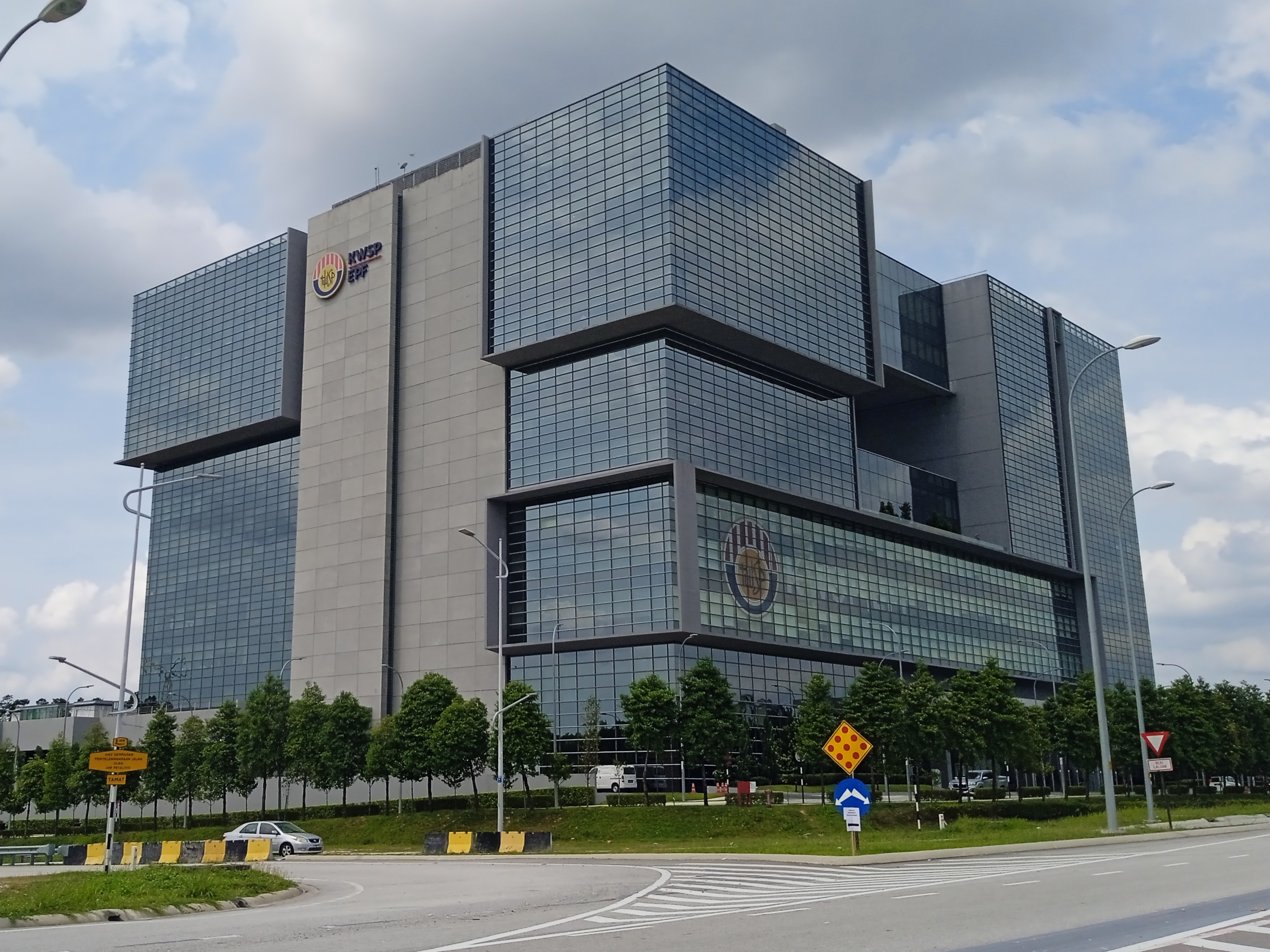
- Menara KWSP, EPF's headquarters in Kwasa Damansara, Selangor

Statutory body overview
- Formed: 1 October 1951; 75 years ago
- Preceding Statutory body: Employees Provident Fund Board (1951)
- Jurisdiction: Government of Malaysia
- Headquarters: Menara KWSP, Kwasa Damansara, 40150, Shah Alam, Selangor, Malaysia
- Employees: 5610
- Statutory body executives: Mohd Zuki Ali, Chairman; Ahmad Zulqarnain Onn, Chief Executive Officer
- Parent ministry: Ministry of Finance
- Key document: EPF Act 1991
- Website: www.kwsp.gov.my

Employees Provident Fund (EPF)
- EPF logo

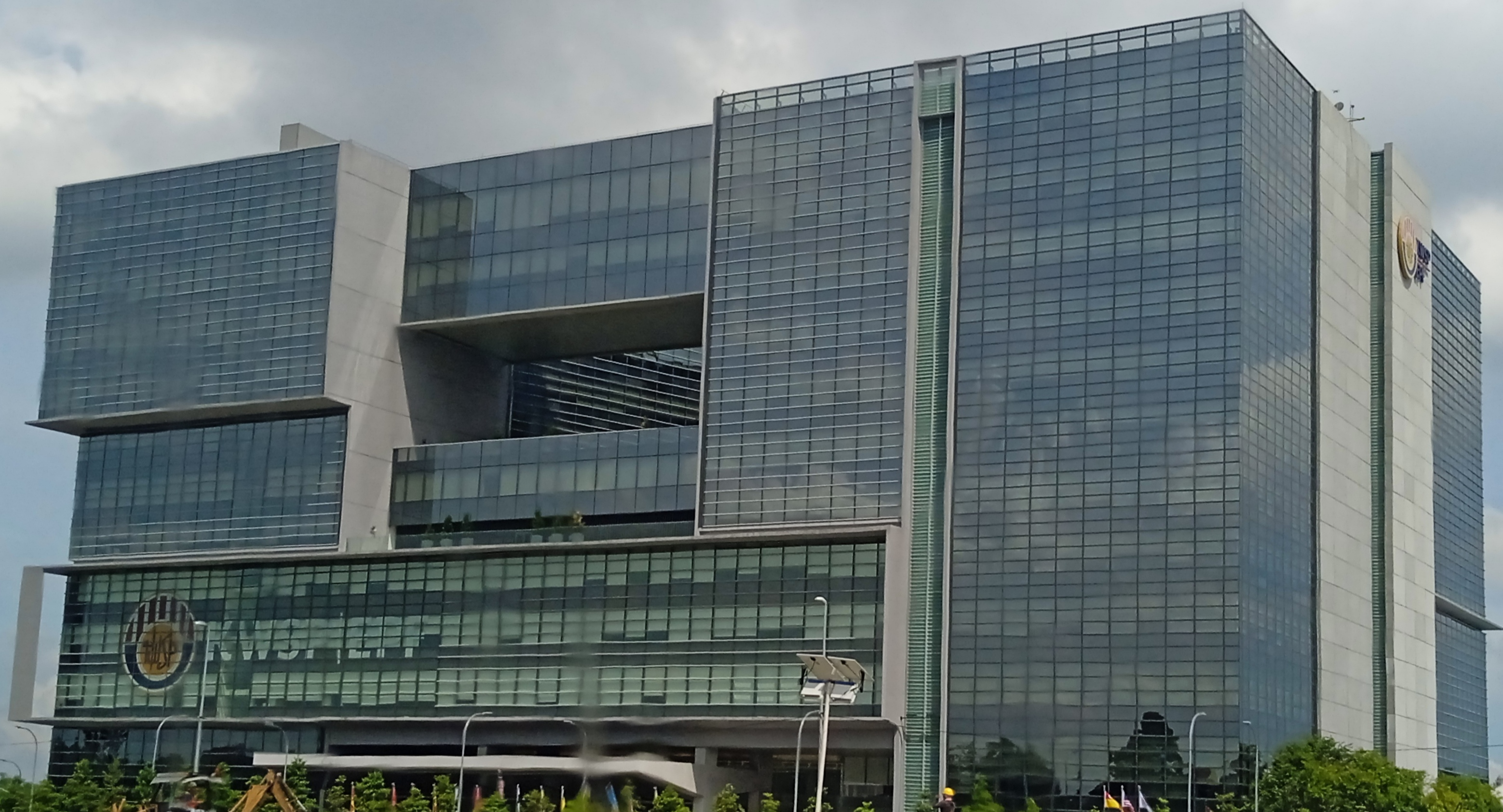
- Menara KWSP, EPF's headquarters in Kwasa Damansara, Selangor
- Native name: كومڤولن واڠ سيمڤنن ڤكرجا
- Romanized name: Kumpulan Wang Simpanan Pekerja (KWSP)
- Type: Statutory body
- Predecessor: Employees Provident Fund Board (1951)
- Founded: 1 October 1951; 75 years ago
- Headquarters: Menara KWSP, Kwasa Damansara, 40150, Shah Alam, Selangor, Malaysia
- Key people: Ahmad Badri Mohd Zahir (chairman); Ahmad Zulqarnain Onn (chief executive officer)
- Revenue: ▼RM 51.91 billion (2022); RM 67.73 billion (2021)
- Net income: ▼RM 48.73 billion (2022); RM 64.43 billion (2021)
- Total assets: ▼RM 1.008 trillion (2022); RM 1.012 trillion (2021)
- Number of employees: 5610
- Parent: Ministry of Finance
- Website: www.kwsp.gov.my

Employees' Provident Fund (EPF; Malay: Kumpulan Wang Simpanan Pekerja, KWSP) is a federal statutory body under the purview of the Ministry of Finance. It manages the compulsory savings plan and retirement planning for private sector workers in Malaysia. Membership of the EPF is mandatory for Malaysian citizens employed in the private sector, and voluntary for non-Malaysian citizens.

== History ==
Malaysian EPF was established on 1 October 1951 pursuant to the Employees Provident Fund Ordinance 1951, under the National Director of Posts. This law became the EPF Act 1951. In 1982, then the EPF Act 1991 in 1991. The EPF Act 1991 requires employees and their employers to contribute towards their retirement savings, and allows workers to withdraw these savings at retirement or for special purposes before then. As of 31 December 2012, EPF had 13.6 million members, of which 6.4 million were active contributing members. As of the same date, EPF had 502,863 contributing employers.

The EPF is intended to help employees from the private sector save a fraction of their salary in a lifetime banking scheme, to be used primarily as a retirement fund but also in the event that the employee is temporarily or no longer fit to work. The EPF also provides a framework for employers to meet legal and moral obligations to their employees.

As of 31 December 2020, the size of the EPF asset size stood at RM998 billion (US$238 billion), making it the fourth largest pension fund in Asia and seventh largest in the world.

As of 2012, the EPF functions by requiring a contribution of at least 11% of each member's monthly salary and storing it in a savings account, while the member's employer is obligated to additionally fund at least 12% of employee's salary to the savings at the same time (13% if salary is below RM5,000).

While in savings, a member's EPF savings may be used as investments for companies deemed profitable and permissible by the organisation, from which dividends are banked to respective members' accounts. Alternately, members may use their EPF savings in their own investments, although such activities are not covered by the EPF and the members are to bear any losses made.

== Dividends ==
The EPF declares an annual dividend on funds on deposit which has varied over time, depending on investment results.

Legally, the EPF is only obligated to provide 2.5% dividends (as per Section 27 of the Employees Provident Fund Act 1991).

The EPF claims that the lowered dividend is the result of its decision to invest in low-risk fixed revenue instruments, which produce lower returns but maintains the principal value of its members' contributions. This is due to the EPF primarily aimed at providing a stable financial security of its members.

In addition, the EPF further elaborates dividend rates and their performances are calculated and influenced based on the full distribution of net EPF revenue, depending on the return on investments that in turn is based on asset allocation.

The EPF also attributes the declining interest market rate since 1996 to the interest market rate. Because 75% of investment funds are concentrated towards bodies closely linked to trends in the interest market rate, including Malaysian Government Securities, loans or bonds, and money market instruments, low interest rates for the past few years had an adverse effect on returns for EPF investments.

In April 2007, criticism was raised at a proposed amendment of EPF guidelines (the EPF Bill (Amendment) 2007) that cuts monthly contributions of members above 55 years by 50% (6.2% from 11% for employees, and 5.7% from 12% for employers). The change was described as a disadvantage to tens and thousands of members compared to those under the pension scheme as the former is not given free medical treatment after retirement, and was described as a form of discrimination towards senior members. Under the proposal, an employer of foreign workers may also optionally contribute RM5 monthly per head, raising concerns of employers' preferences towards foreign employees. The government responded by claiming that the proposal may be studied, and later states that members can contribute at any amount above the slashed contributed amount. The EPF guideline for employers of foreign workers remains unchanged, citing that the policy has been implemented before in 1998.

Dividends by year
Savings type	2025	2024	2023	2022	2021	2020	2019	2018	2017	2016	2015	2014
Conventional	6.15%	6.30%	5.50%	5.35%	6.10%	5.20%	5.45%	6.15%	6.90%	5.70%	6.40%	6.75%
Shariah	6.15%	6.30%	5.40%	4.75%	5.65%	4.90%	5.00%	5.90%	-	-	-	-

== Withdrawal ==
As a retirement plan, money accumulated in an EPF savings can only be withdrawn when members reach 50 years old, during which they may withdraw only 30% of their EPF; members who are 55 years old or older may withdraw all of their EPF. When a member dies beforehand, the EPF fund is withdrawn in favour of a nominated individual. Withdrawals are also possible when a member permanently emigrates, becomes disabled, or requires essential medical treatment. Members above 55 years old can choose not to withdraw EPF savings immediately and withdraw only later, and, under existing guidelines, employers may continue to contribute 12% of the members' salaries at their own discretion.

== Accounts ==
Effective 11 May 2024, a member's EPF savings consists of three accounts:

Akaun Persaraan (Retirement Account or Account 1): 75% of contributions,

Akaun Sejahtera (Well-being Account or Account 2): 15% of contributions,

Akaun Fleksible (Flexible Account or Account 3): 10% contribution.

Akaun Persaraan can be withdrawn at the age of 55. (To note, this is 5 years earlier than the official retirement age, as the full withdrawal age was not increased when the official retirement age was increased to 60).

Akaun Sejahtera can be withdrawn at the age of 50. In addition, Akaun Sejahtera can also be withdrawn (before the age of 50) for the purchase of a house, the repayment of housing loans, education expenses, Hajj and insurance policies sold under the i-Lindung platform.

Akaun Fleksibel can be withdrawn at any time. The introduction of Akaun Fleksibel reflects a shift toward accommodating the short-term financial needs of EPF members while still safeguarding their retirement savings in Accounts I and II.

== See also ==
- The Central Provident Fund, Singapore
- Provident Fund, for other "provident funds" in other countries
- Economy of Malaysia
- List of states and federal territories of Malaysia by household income
