= Public Services Commission of Malaysia =

Government agency

Public Service Commission of Malaysia (PSC)
- Suruhanjaya Perkhidmatan Awam Malaysia سوروهنجاي ڤرخدمتن عوام (SPA)

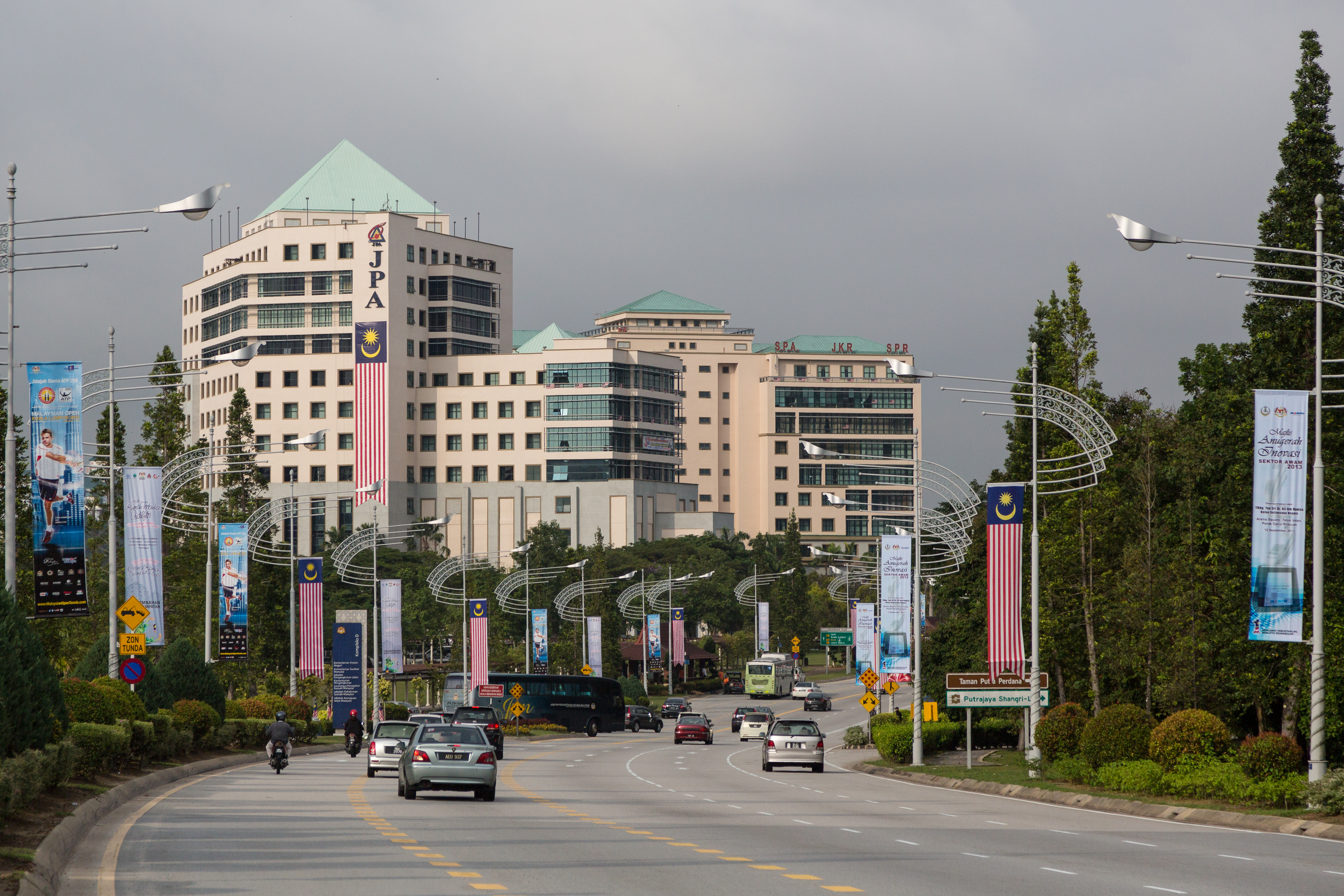

Agency overview
- Formed: 31 August 1957; 68 years ago
- Jurisdiction: Government of Malaysia
- Headquarters: Level 6-10, Block C7, Complex C, Federal Government Administrative Centre, 62520 Putrajaya
- Motto: Convenient, Prompt and Accurate (Mudah, Cepat dan Tepat)
- Employees: 483 (2017)
- Annual budget: MYR 40,320,000 (2017)
- Agency executive: Wan Ahmad Dahlan Abdul Aziz, Chairman
- Key document: Article 144(1) of the Federal Constitution of Malaysia
- Website: www.spa.gov.my

The Public Service Commission of Malaysia (Malay: Suruhanjaya Perkhidmatan Awam Malaysia; Jawi: سوروهنجاي ڤرخدمتن عوام), abbreviated SPA or PSC, is established by Article 139 of the Constitution of Malaysia. It is responsible for the general administration of the Public Services of Malaysia's Federal Government. It establishes the rules and regulations for the conduct of all members of the Federal civil service. The commission has the authority to appoint and dismiss most members of the services. It gives advice to the King of Malaysia regarding appointments to positions that he has designated as Special posts. The Chairman and other members of the Commission are appointed by the King of Malaysia at his discretion, as laid down in Article 139(4) of the Federal Constitution.
