= Malaysia–United States relations =

- Malaysia: United States

Diplomatic mission
- Embassy of Malaysia, Washington DC: Embassy of The United States of America, Kuala Lumpur

Envoy
- His Excellency Muhammad Shahrul Ikram Yaakob: His Excellency Edgard Kagan

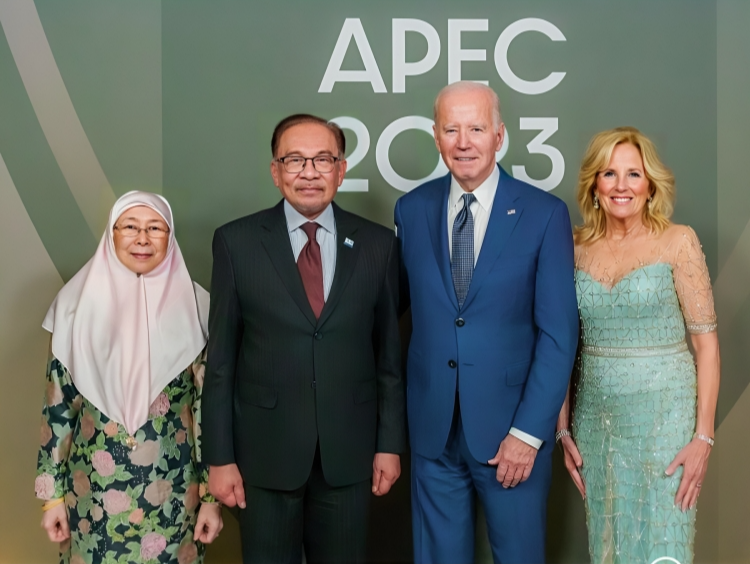
Malaysian Prime Minister Anwar Ibrahim with US President Joe Biden and their spouses Wan Azizah Wan Ismail and Jill Biden during APEC United States 2023 on 11 November.

Bilateral ties between Malaysia and the United States of America were established upon Malayan independence in 1957. The US was, and still is, one of the largest trading partners for Malaysia and is traditionally considered to be Malaysia's oldest and closest ally in military, economic and education sectors. Malaya was the predecessor state to Malaysia, a larger federation formed through the merger of Malaya, North Borneo, Sarawak and Singapore in 1963. Immediately before the merger, the latter three territories were previously part of the British Empire. But the US has had a consular and commercial presence in Malaya since the 1800s. US merchants, especially Joseph William Torrey together with Thomas Bradley Harris, also had commercial interests in the north western coast of Borneo in the 19th century, where they established the American Trading Company of Borneo.

Malaysia has its embassy in Washington, D.C., and consulate-general offices in Los Angeles and New York City. The United States maintains its embassy in Kuala Lumpur. Beginning in April 2014, the US considered Malaysia as a Comprehensive Partner which increased the importance of diplomatic ties as part of President Barack Obama's Pivot to Asia policy. The partnership increased bilateral consultations and co-operation on politics, diplomacy, trade, investment, education, people-to-people ties, security, the environment, science, technology and energy, which continued to be enhanced by President Donald Trump in 2017.

In 2016, the US is Malaysia's third largest export market in terms of value, while Malaysia is the US's 25th largest export destination and among the largest trading partners for the latter.

== History ==
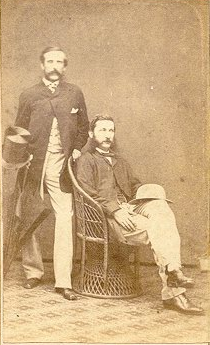
Thomas Bradley Harris (standing left) and Joseph William Torrey (sitting right), both are the first US merchants to establishing presence in present-day Malaysian Borneo.

The United States has a long commercial interest in Malaysia, dating back to the 1800s when the territories now part of the Southeast Asian country were part of the British Empire. While Malaysia through Malaya only established a diplomatic presence in the US beginning in 1957, the US had consular posts in Malaya and commercial interests in northern Borneo since the 1800s. In 1850, the US recognised the status of the Kingdom of Sarawak which was established by an Englishman named James Brooke as an independent state. US merchants Torrey and Harris through the American Trading Company of Borneo had a tract of land in the north west of Borneo, which was however sold to Baron von Overbeck in 1876. The US further appointed a consul in George Town in 1918 and established additional consular posts in Kuala Lumpur in 1948 and Kuching in 1968. The modern ties between Malaysia and the US are generally warm, with the US having supported Malaysia during the Indonesia–Malaysia confrontation, an armed conflict arising from Indonesian opposition to the formation of Malaysia, marking the beginning of US direct involvement in the political affairs of Malaysia. Earlier, during World War II, the US played a role in the liberation of Southeast Asia from Japanese occupation, especially in the liberation of Borneo as the island is located close to the Commonwealth of the Philippines, which is a protectorate of the latter. During the Malayan Emergency, the Malayan government and the British colonialists received aid from the United States to suppress the communist independence rebellion.

Political relations, however became strained, under the Bush administration during the Iraq War. Mahathir Mohamad who ruled from 1981 until 2003 was critical of the foreign policy of the United States at the time, especially the foreign policy of the George W. Bush administration's invasion of Iraq during the Iraq War. Nevertheless, these periods of tensions between the two nations did not prevent the US from being one of the largest trading partners for Malaysia during Mahathir's tenure. The US was, and still is one of the largest trading partners for Malaysia and is traditionally considered to be Malaysia's closest ally. In 2002, Malaysia-US Friendship Council was established to strengthen the friendship between the Malaysian government and the US government. Mohd Noor Amin, Chairman of the International Multilateral Partnership Against Cyber Threats (IMPACT), was appointed as the Secretary-General for this council. The council is headquartered in Washington, D.C. and sponsored by leading Malaysian companies to offer advice on matters relating to bilateral relationship between the two countries.

Under the helm of Prime Minister Najib Razak's administration, the two-way diplomatic ties between the two sovereign nations have since warmed and became normalised once more. Subsequently, US President Barack Obama's made his first official visit to Malaysia in April 2014, the first visit by a sitting US president since 1966. Prime Minister Najib and President Obama issued a joint statement that, among other things, elevated the Malaysia-US relationship to a comprehensive partnership. Malaysia is currently pursuing the Trans-Pacific Partnership (TPP) treaty with the support of the US until January 2017. Both countries continue to enjoy warm relations with the two leaders became close personal friends. On Christmas Eve in 2014, both Najib and Obama are seen playing golf together in Hawaii. Following the victory of Donald Trump in the 2016 US presidential election, the relations continue to be strengthened with Najib was among the international leaders that congratulated Trump and looked forward to continuing a partnership with the US under his presidency. In June 2018, the United States Embassy in Kuala Lumpur hosting a series of programs in Sabah (the former North Borneo) to celebrate the 150+ years of partnership with the people of the territory.

On 13 June 2020, former Prime Minister Mahathir Mohamad endorsed former Vice-President Joe Biden in the 2020 US Presidential Election.

In July 2025, President Trump nominated Nick Adams as the new US ambassador to Malaysia. This appointment was met with much opposition and protest in Malaysia. In late October 2025, Trump undertook his first state visit to Malaysia where he attended the 47th ASEAN summit, met with Prime Minister Anwar Ibrahim and signed multiple trade agreements.

== Economic relations ==
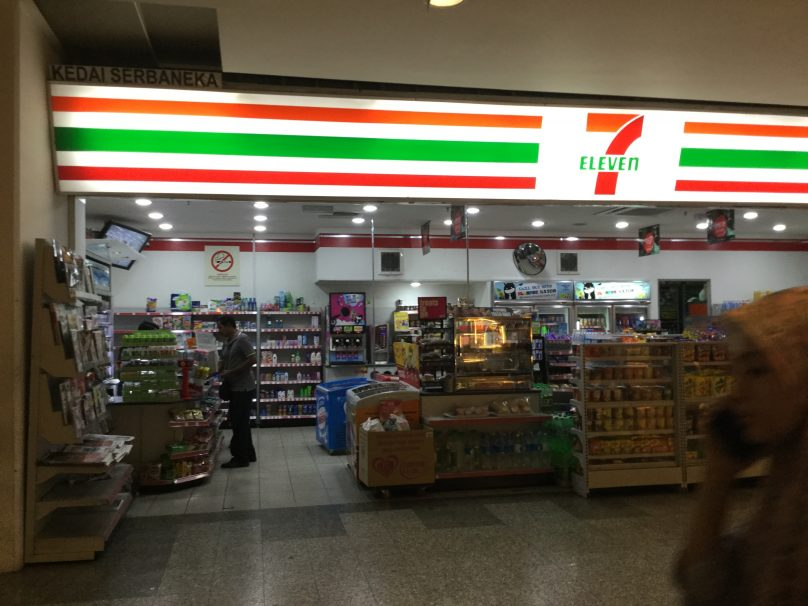
A 7-Eleven store in Kuala Lumpur, Malaysia. The Japanese-owned American chain of convenience store has around 2,000 stores in the country as of 2016.

The earliest significant economic relations between the territories now part of Malaysia, in particular Malaya, was the US involvement in the production and trade of tin and rubber. Malaya at one time was the largest single producer of both commodities and the US was the largest importer of Malayan tin. By 1917, rubber became Malaya's most important exports and the US absorbed 77% of Malaya's total rubber production. The great demand for rubber was due to the rising production of automobile in Malaysia.

In modern days, the US is one of the largest foreign investors in Malaysia. The American Malaysian Chamber of Commerce serves as a business association for collaboration between both countries. While figures capturing the full range of foreign investment (including oil and gas) are not available, American companies are particularly active in the energy, electronics, and manufacturing sectors and employ nearly 200,000 Malaysian workers. The cumulative value of US private investment in the manufacturing sector in Malaysia is roughly $15 billion. In the 1970s, American companies, including Agilent AMD, Fairchild Semiconductor, Freescale Semiconductor, Intel, Texas Instruments and Western Digital pioneered the Malaysian electrical and electronics (E&E) sector, which exports billions of dollars of equipment to global supply chains every year. Major US oil and gas companies, including ExxonMobil, ConocoPhillips, Hess and Murphy Oil, have invested billions of dollars to develop Malaysia's energy resources. Many US-based fast-food/coffeehouse chains such as A&W Restaurants, Burger King, Domino's Pizza, Dunkin' Donuts, KFC, McDonald's, Pizza Hut, Starbucks, Subway, Texas Chicken and Wendy's have already dominated the Malaysian fast food/coffeehouse markets. Recent US investors include Hershey, Kellogg's, Bose and Golden Gate Capital. The US is Malaysia's fourth largest trading partner and Malaysia is the 22nd largest trading partner of the US. Annual two-way trade in goods and services in 2013 amounted to approximately $44 billion.

Malaysia and the US launched negotiations for a bilateral free trade agreement in June 2005 but did not conclude an agreement after eight rounds of talks. Malaysian investment in the US is small but growing, particularly in leisure, gaming and biotechnology. Significant Malaysian companies operating in the US include Genting's Resort World Casino and MOL Global, a New York Stock Exchange listed company. In 2010, Malaysia joined the US, Australia, Brunei, Canada, Chile, Mexico, New Zealand, Peru, Singapore and Vietnam in negotiating the Trans-Pacific Partnership (TPP) (Japan subsequently joined the negotiations in 2013). This agreement seeks to expand market access, strengthen intellectual property protections, and support high labour and environmental standards while fostering greater economic integration among participants. The US however has since left the TPP in 2017.

In early April 2025, the second Trump Administration imposed a 24% reciprocal tariff on Malaysian exports to the United States as part of Donald Trump's global Liberation Day tariffs. In response, Malaysian Finance Minister Amir Hamzah Azizan said that the Malaysian government would seek to resolve differences with the United States through dialogue. Malaysian Prime Minister Anwar Ibrahim said that Malaysia would not face a recession and that ASEAN would coordinate a unified response. In July 2025, the Trump administration announced plans to restrict AI chip shipments to Malaysia due to Chinese smuggling concerns. As a result of the draft US rule to ban AI chip shipments, technology stocks and construction of data centers fell in Malaysia.

In late July 2025, the Trump Administration lowered Malaysia's tariff rate from 24% to 19%, which came into effect on 5 August 2025. On 26 October 2025, the Malaysian and US governments signed a trade agreement that exempted 1,711 Malaysian products from the US tariffs regime while still maintaining the 19% tariff rate on Malaysian exports to the US. On 27 October, the two governments signed a memorandum of understanding to facilitate the development of critical minerals and rare earth minerals in partnership with US companies.

== Education relations ==
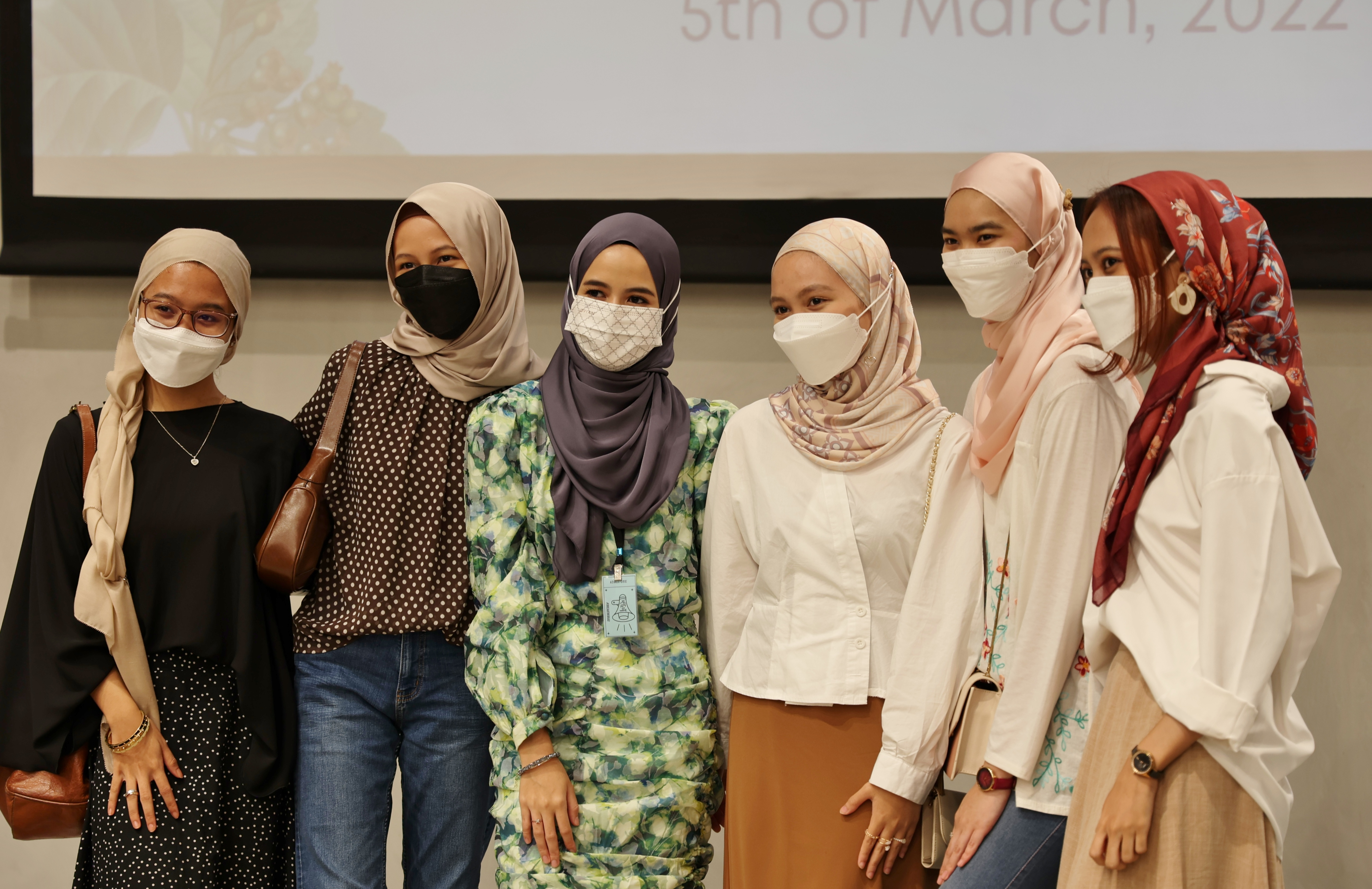
Creating Agents of Change (CAFC) at the US embassy in Kuala Lumpur, 2022

The Fulbright English Teaching Assistant program helping improve the English language skills of thousands of Malaysian secondary school students and there is around 6,000 alumni of United States Department of State-sponsored exchange programs in Malaysia. In 2014, President Obama announced additional exchange programs, grant opportunities and fellowships for youth ages 18–35 under the Young Southeast Asian Young Leaders Initiative (YSEALI). Since 2001, the Ambassadors Fund for Cultural Preservation (AFCP) has supported 10 projects to support the preservation of cultural heritage in Malaysia.

== Security co-operation and relations ==
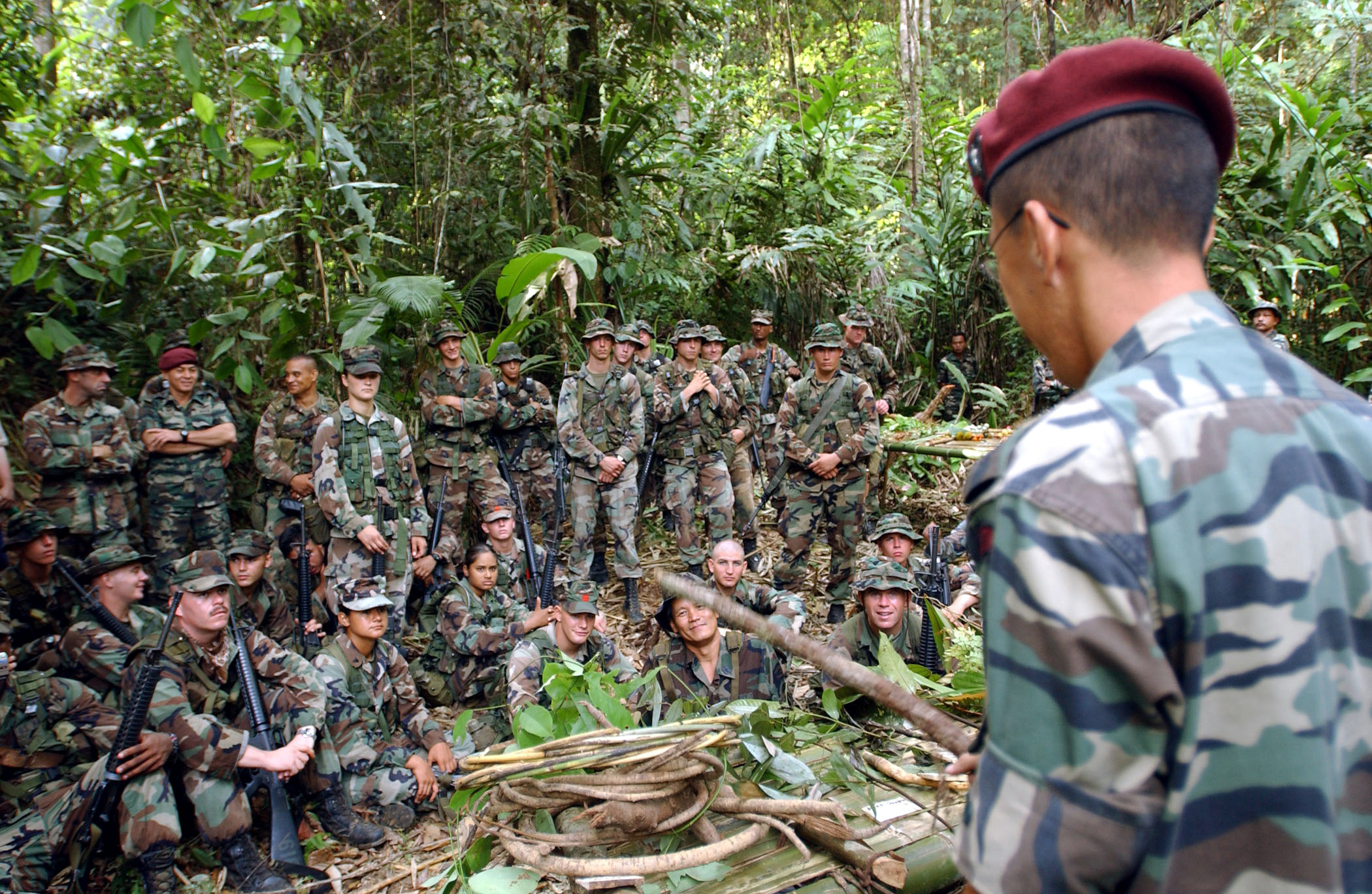
United States Marine Corps (USMC) personnel listening to a class given to them by Commander Lee of the Malaysian Armed Forces during the Cooperation Afloat Readiness and Training (Exercise CARAT) in 2002.

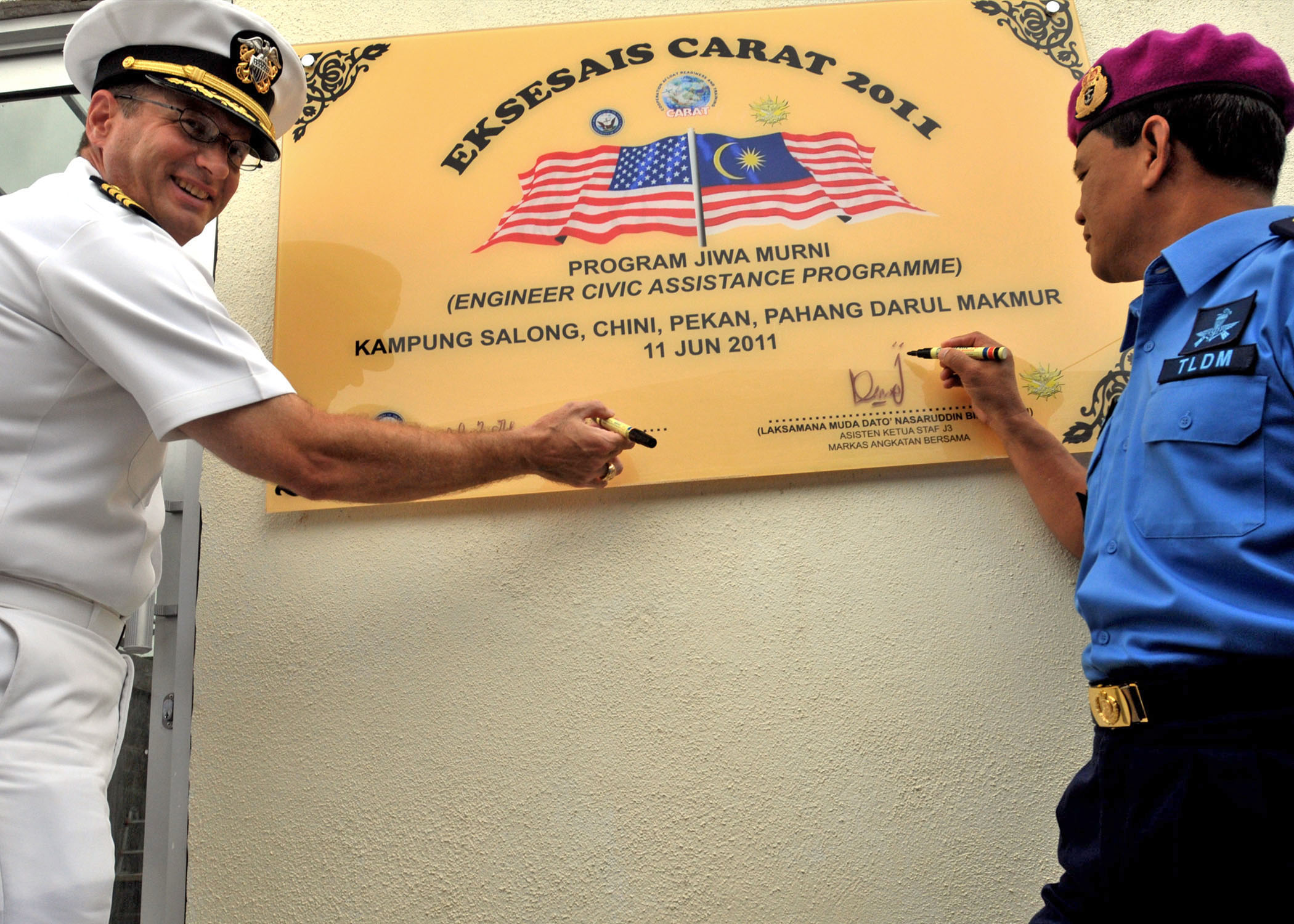
United States Navy Captain and Royal Malaysian Navy Rear Admiral together signing a dedication plaque for a new medical clinic built in Pekan, Pahang through collaboration during Exercise CARAT in 2011.

Malaysia and the US enjoy strong security co-operation, with both have maintained steady defence co-operation and alliance since the 1990s. While Malaysia's security are secured by the Five Power Defence Arrangements (FPDA) with Australia, New Zealand, Singapore and the United Kingdom, the US also has military alliance with both Australia and New Zealand under the Australia, New Zealand, United States Security Treaty (ANZUS) and has established direct military and political co-operation with Singapore and Malaysia, whose armed forces were growing increasingly dependent on American arms shipments, with the M4 carbine and M16 rifle became the major assault rifles for both armed forces. Several US high-technology weapons systems also been purchased by Malaysia, notably the McDonnell Douglas F/A-18D fighter aircraft, and McDonnell Douglas MD 530G attack helicopter.

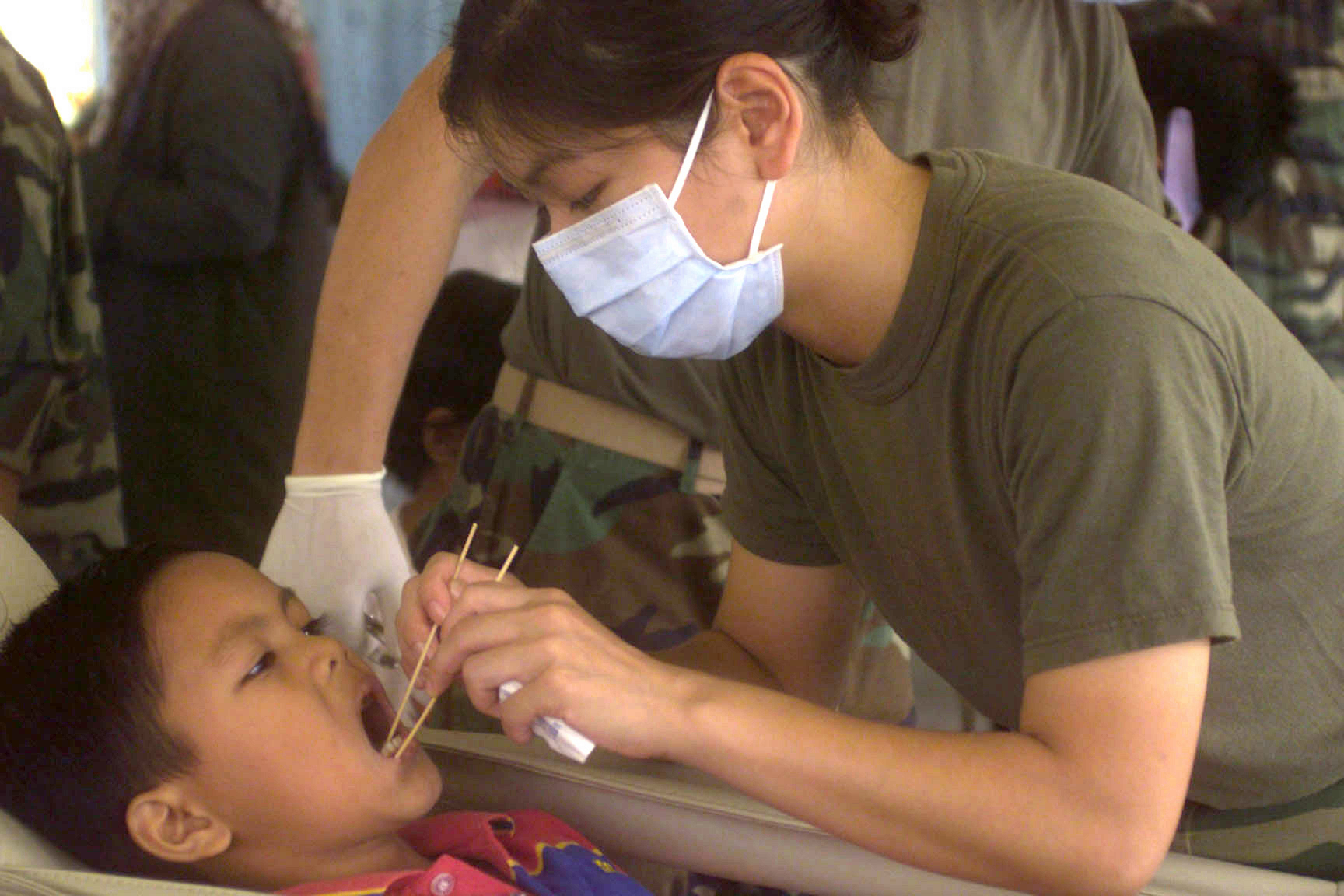
A United States Navy Lieutenant Dental Officer treating the Malaysian townspeople of Nilai, Negeri Sembilan during a medical and dental civic action project of CARAT in 2002.

During the Battle of Mogadishu in October 1993, 113 members of a Malaysian Army battalion was deployed as part of the United Nations Operation in Somalia II to rescue American rangers who were surrounded by Somali militants after two US Sikorsky UH-60 Black Hawk was shot down by the latter. On 1 July 2003, Malaysia established the Southeast Asia Regional Centre for Counter-Terrorism (SEARCCT), where the two countries collaborate in combating terrorist financing. Both Malaysia and the US share a strong military-to-military relationship with numerous exchanges, training, joint exercises, and visits such as the annual participation of both countries in the Cooperation Afloat Readiness and Training (Exercise CARAT) and co-operation in International Military Education and Training (IMET). The US is also among foreign countries that have collaborated with the centre in conducting capacity building programmes. Malaysia's Peacekeeping Centre provides pre-deployment training to Malaysian and other peacekeepers before deployment on United Nations (UN) missions. Through the Global Peace Operations Initiative, the US provided support for the Malaysian Peacekeeping Centre. During President Obama's April 2014 visit, Malaysia endorsed the Proliferation Security Initiative (PSI).

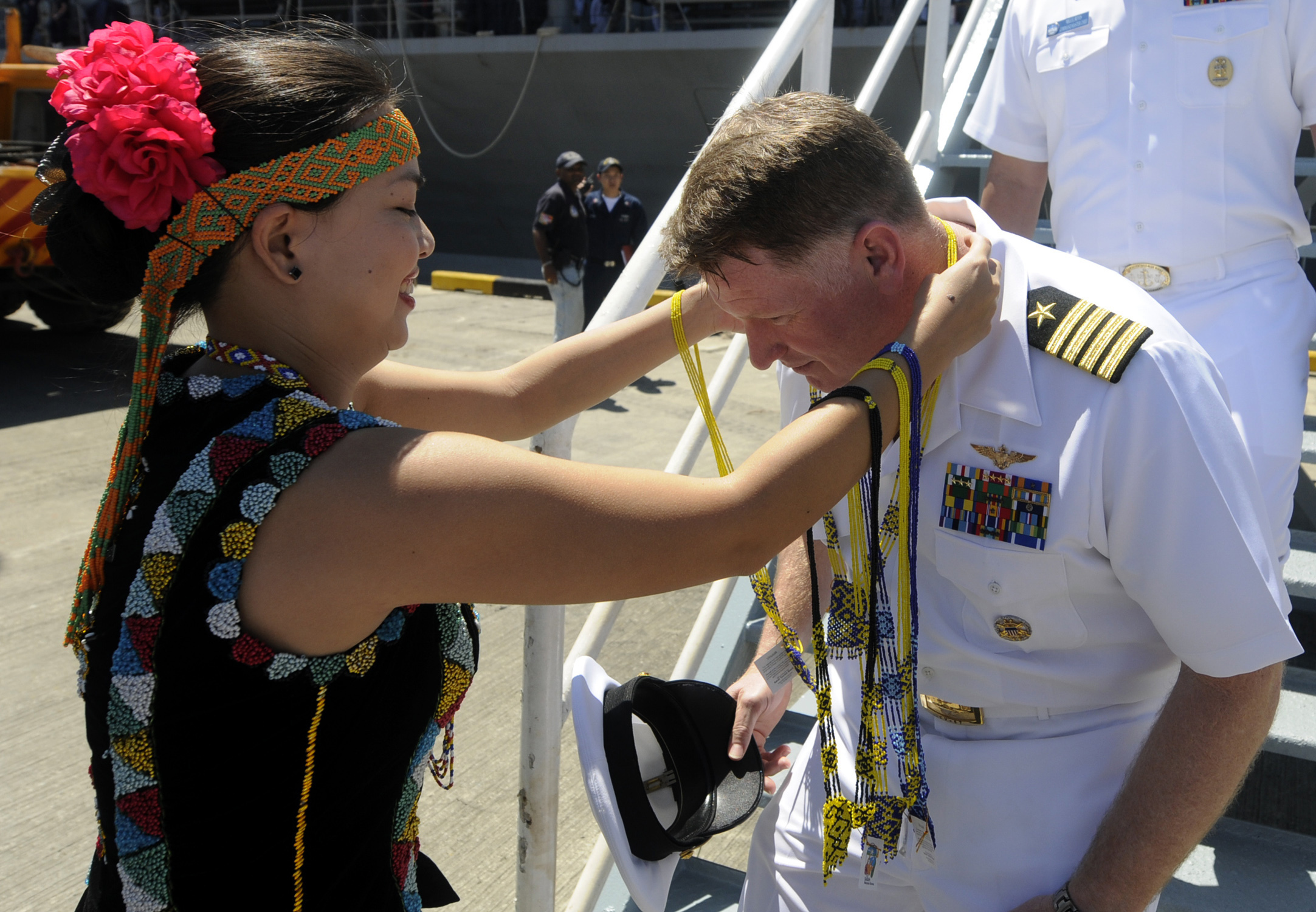
USS Blue Ridge (LCC-19) ship crews including its Captain Rudy Lupton, commanding officer of the US 7th Fleet command ship is welcomed with a litai necklace by the indigenous people of Sabah on the pier during a port visit to the city of Kota Kinabalu.

Throughout the defence relations of both countries, many visits has been made by American military ships including by the Nimitz-class nuclear-powered supercarriers of USS John C. Stennis, and aircraft carrier of USS Abraham Lincoln (CVN-72), Spearhead-class expeditionary fast transport ship USNS Brunswick, America-class amphibious assault ship USS America (LHA-6), Arleigh Burke-class guided-missile destroyer USS Milius, Blue Ridge-class command ship USS Blue Ridge (LCC-19), Wasp-class landing helicopter dock assault ships of USS Essex (LHD-2), and USS Bonhomme Richard (LHD-6), San Antonio-class amphibious transport dock USS Green Bay (LPD-20), Whidbey Island-class dock landing ship USS Ashland (LSD 48), and Avenger-class mine countermeasures ship USS Pioneer (MCM 9). On 12 November 2024, during a historic State Partnership engagement with the Royal Malaysian Air Force at RMAF Subang Air Base in Malaysia, an American KC-135 Stratotanker assigned to the 141st Air Refueling Wing of Washington Air National Guard refuelled three of the Russian made-Sukhoi Su-30MKM aircraft of the RMAF.

== Kuala Lumpur Peace Accord ==
The Kuala Lumpur Peace Accord, brokered both by the President of the United States, Donald Trump and Malaysia's Prime Minister, Anwar Ibrahim, was established as a historic peace declaration and ending the border tension between Thailand and Cambodia. The Accords was signed in Kuala Lumpur Convention Centre, in Kuala Lumpur, the federal capital city of Malaysia on 26th October 2025, in conjunction with the 47th ASEAN Summit.

President Donald Trump delight celebration with Prime Minister Anwar Ibrahim and performers during an arrival ceremony at Kuala Lumpur International Airport. Flag-waiving crowd celebrating the arrival of the United States' President, Donald Trump and Malaysia's Prime Minister Anwar Ibrahim with US flag and Malaysia's Jalur Gemilang. President Donald Trump participates in an arrival ceremony with Malaysian Prime Minister Anwar Ibrahim at Kuala Lumpur International Airport with Air Force One.

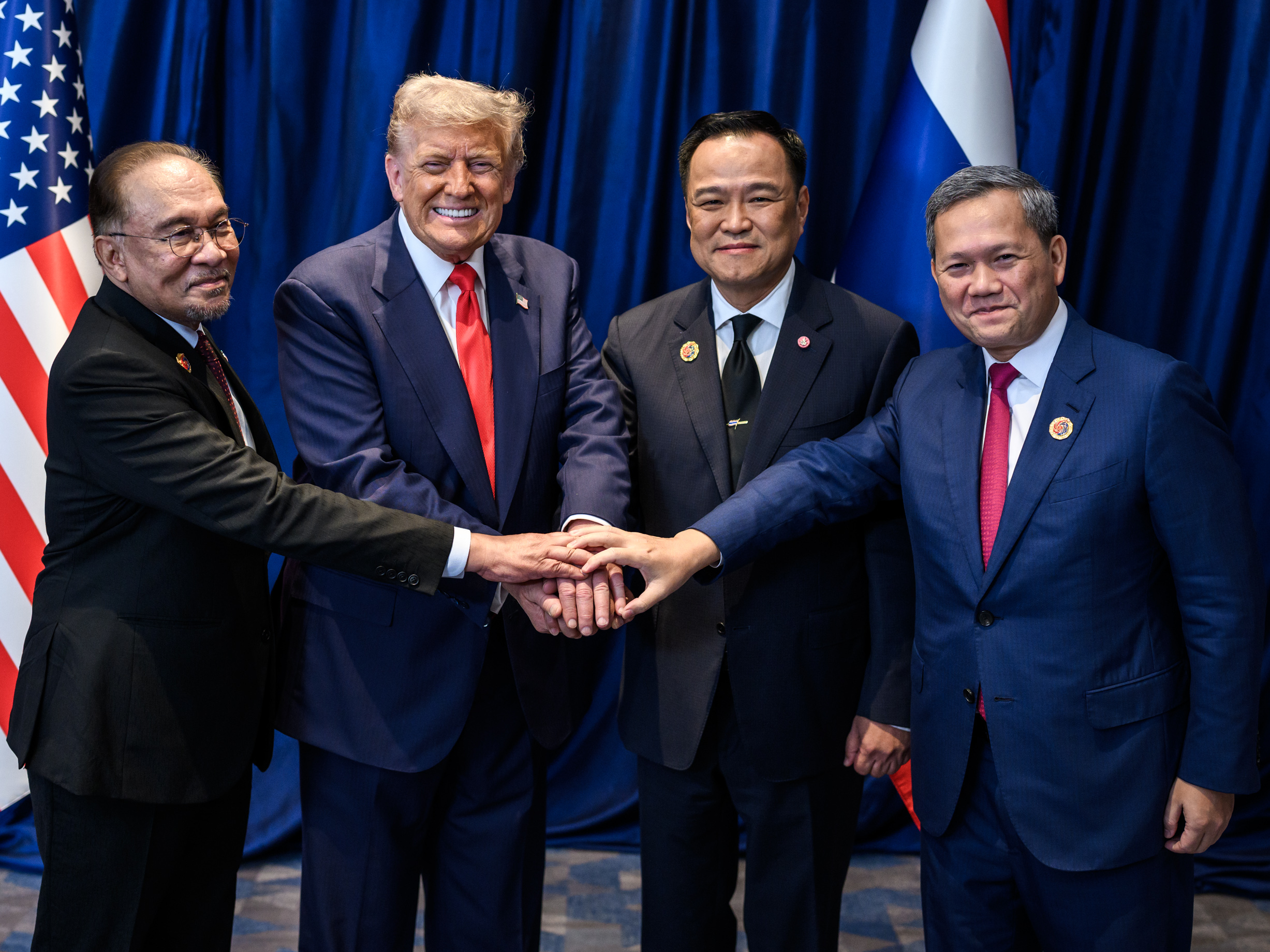
(Right to Left) The Prime Minister of Malaysia Dato' Seri Anwar Ibrahim, President of the United States Donald Trump, Prime Minister of Thailand Anutin Charnvirakul, and Prime Minister of Cambodia Hun Manet before signing the Kuala Lumpur Accord on October 25 at the ASEAN Summit.

== Official visits ==
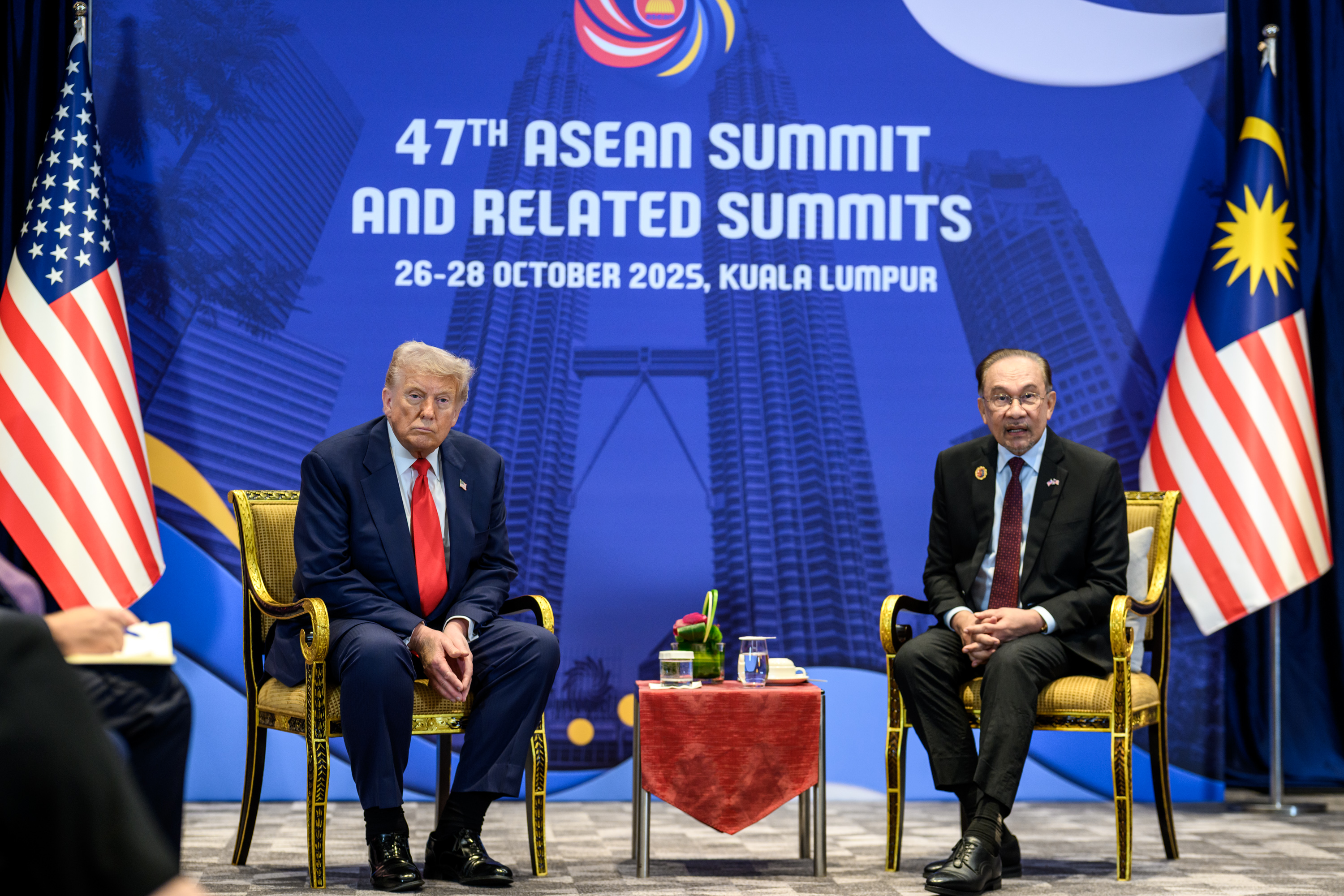
US President Donald Trump and Malaysian Prime Minister Anwar Ibrahim at a bilateral meeting during the 47th ASEAN Summit, 26 October 2025.

Prime Minister Najib Razak and President Barack Obama met just before the Nuclear Security Summit in Washington on 12 April 2010. This meeting was thought by many to represent a significant improvement in Malaysia–United States relations. This was their first one-on-one meeting. During their talk, Obama sought further assistance from Malaysia in stemming nuclear proliferation which Obama described as the greatest threat to world security. In June 2009, Najib and Obama discussed via telephone the 2008 financial crisis, nuclear non-proliferation issues and two Malaysians detained at Guantanamo Bay detention camp. During the summit Najib stressed that Malaysia only supported nuclear programmes designed for peaceful purposes. Najib's attendance at the summit was part of a week-long official visit to the US.

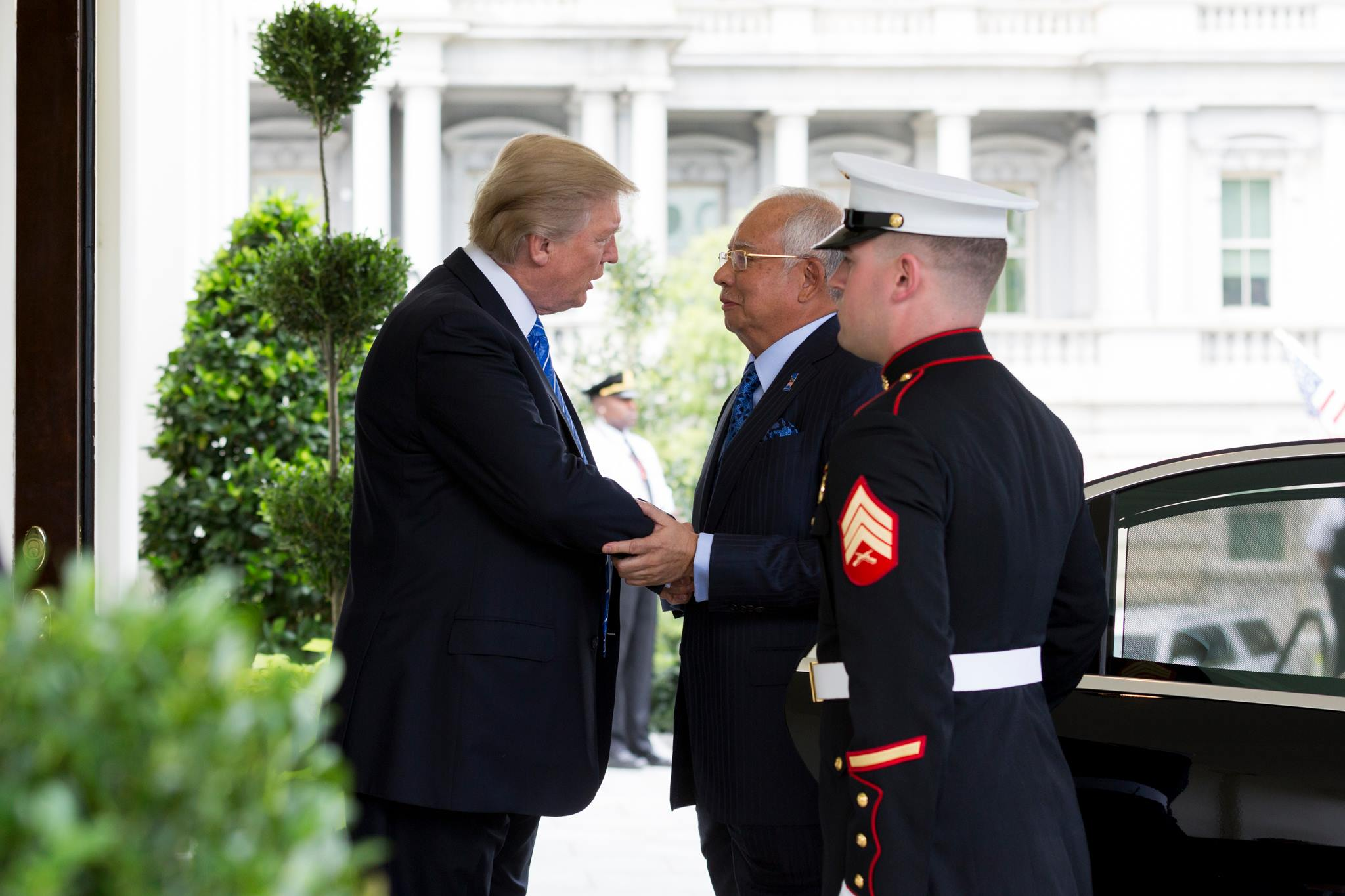
US President Donald Trump welcoming Prime Minister Najib Razak during the latter's visit to the White House in 2017.

On 21 October 2013, Secretary of State John Kerry and Secretary of Commerce Penny Pritzker visited Kuala Lumpur to participate in the Global Entrepreneurship Summit. Secretary Kerry visited Malaysia again from 4 to 6 August 2015 to attend the ASEAN Regional Forum (ARF). On 26 April 2014, President Obama made a state visit to Malaysia. He is the second US president to visit Malaysia since Lyndon B. Johnson in 1966.

From 19 to 26 September 2023, Prime Minister Anwar Ibrahim visited US as part of his prime ministerial trips.

The following are senior US diplomats and politicians who have visited Malaysia:

- US Attorney General Robert F. Kennedy visited Malaysia in January 1964.
- US President Lyndon B. Johnson visited Kuala Lumpur in October 1966.
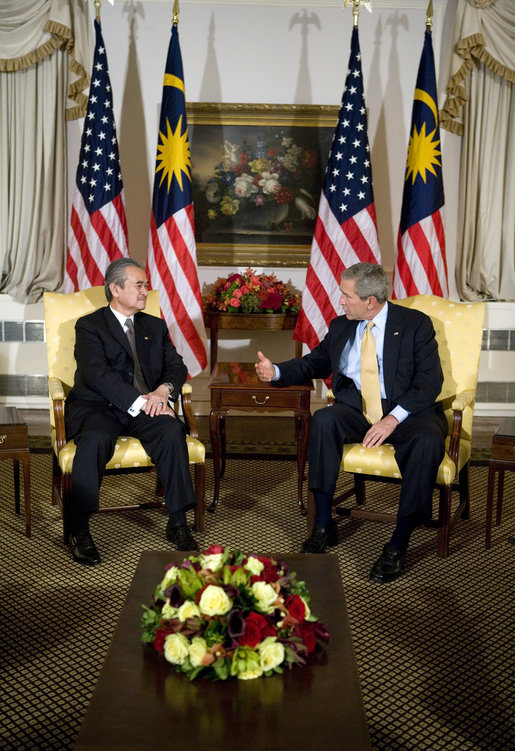
- US President George W. Bush and Prime Minister Abdullah Ahmad Badawi in the White House in September 2006.
  US Secretary of State Condoleezza Rice visited Kuala Lumpur in July 2006.
- Former US President Bill Clinton visited Malaysia in December 2008.
- US Secretary of State Hillary Clinton made a 3-day bilateral visit to Kuala Lumpur in November 2010.
- US Secretary of Defense Robert Gates visited Malaysia in November 2010.
- US Attorney General Eric Holder visited Kuala Lumpur, Malaysia in July 2012.
- US Secretary of Defense Chuck Hagel visited Kuala Lumpur, Malaysia in August 2013.
- US Secretary of the Treasury Jacob Lew visited Kuala Lumpur, Malaysia in November 2013.
- US President Barack Obama visited Malaysia in April 2014.
- US Trade Representative Michael Froman visited Kuala Lumpur, Malaysia on four occasions, most recently in 2015.
- US Congress bipartisan delegation led by Paul Ryan, Chairman of the House Ways and Means Committee visited Kuala Lumpur, Malaysia in February 2015.
- US Secretary of State Mike Pompeo visited Kuala Lumpur, Malaysia in August 2018.
- US Secretary of State Marco Rubio visited Kuala Lumpur in July 2025 to meet with Malaysian Prime Minister Anwar Ibrahim, Malaysian Foreign Minister Mohamad Hasan, and Russian Foreign Minister Sergey Lavrov. He also participated in 15th East Asia Foreign Ministers' meeting and the 32nd ASEAN Regional Forum (ARF).
- US President Donald Trump attended the ASEAN Summit in Kuala Lumpur in late October 2025. He met with Prime Minister Anwar, signed multiple trade agreements, and witnessed a peace accord between Thailand and Cambodia.

== Disapproval of US foreign policy ==
=== Public opinion ===
According to global opinion polls, only 27% of Malaysians viewed the US favourably in 2007, likely due to disapproval of US foreign policy against fellow Islamic nations. However, as of 2013, 55% of Malaysians view the US favourably, declining somewhat down to 51% in 2014. According to the same poll conducted in 2015, 54% of Malaysians had confidence that President Obama would do the right thing in international affairs. According to the 2012 US Global Leadership Report, 34% of Malaysians approved of US leadership, with 31% disapproving and 35% uncertain. According to a 2026 Pew Research Center survey, 19% of Malaysians had a favorable view of the United States, while 80% had a negative view.

=== Palestinian issues ===
Malaysia has been a long-standing supporter of the State of Palestine's right to existence and its statehood. Following the October 7 attacks on Israel and the subsequent Israeli invasion of the Gaza Strip in the Gaza war, with Malaysia's sympathies towards Palestine increasing, the United States has sent three diplomatic démarches to Malaysia over its vocal stance on the issue and support of the Palestinian militant group Hamas. The US also levelled up its sanctions against any foreign supporters of Hamas and other militant groups operating in Palestine through the Hamas International Financing Prevention Act, aimed at cutting off international financing to the groups. Malaysia, through its Prime Minister Anwar, has responded that it will not recognise unilateral US sanctions on the Palestinian plight, with his government closely monitoring the bill, adding that it could affect Malaysia only if Malaysia is proven to provide any material support to Hamas or the Palestinian Islamic Jihad. Malaysia's Prime Minister's Office, despite its continuous support for the Palestinian cause, has stated that it condemns terrorism in all its forms and also categorically condemns the actions of Hamas in killing innocent lives and taking Israeli women and children as hostages. A 2024 Pew Research poll shows that 84 per cent of Malaysians are dissatisfied with the way US President Joe Biden handled Israel's war in Gaza.

=== US sanctions ===
In December 2023, the United States Department of the Treasury sanctioned four Malaysian-based companies that were accused of assisting Iran's production of drones. The United States Government has accused Iran of exporting drones to what it considers "terrorist proxies" in the Middle East and to Russian forces in Ukraine. In early May 2024 Brian E. Nelson, the Under Secretary of the Treasury for Terrorism and Financial Intelligence, alleged that Malaysian operators were using "ship-to-ship" oil transfers to transport Iranian oil in violation of US sanctions on Iran. The US-based watchdog United Against Nuclear Iran also alleged that Malaysian operators were facilitating the export of Iranian oil to China under the "Malaysian blend" brand.

Following US officials' claims that Iran relies on Malaysian service providers to sell oil under US sanctions in the region, a senior government official said, Malaysia does not recognise economic sanctions imposed by the United States or any other individual country.

== Diplomatic missions ==
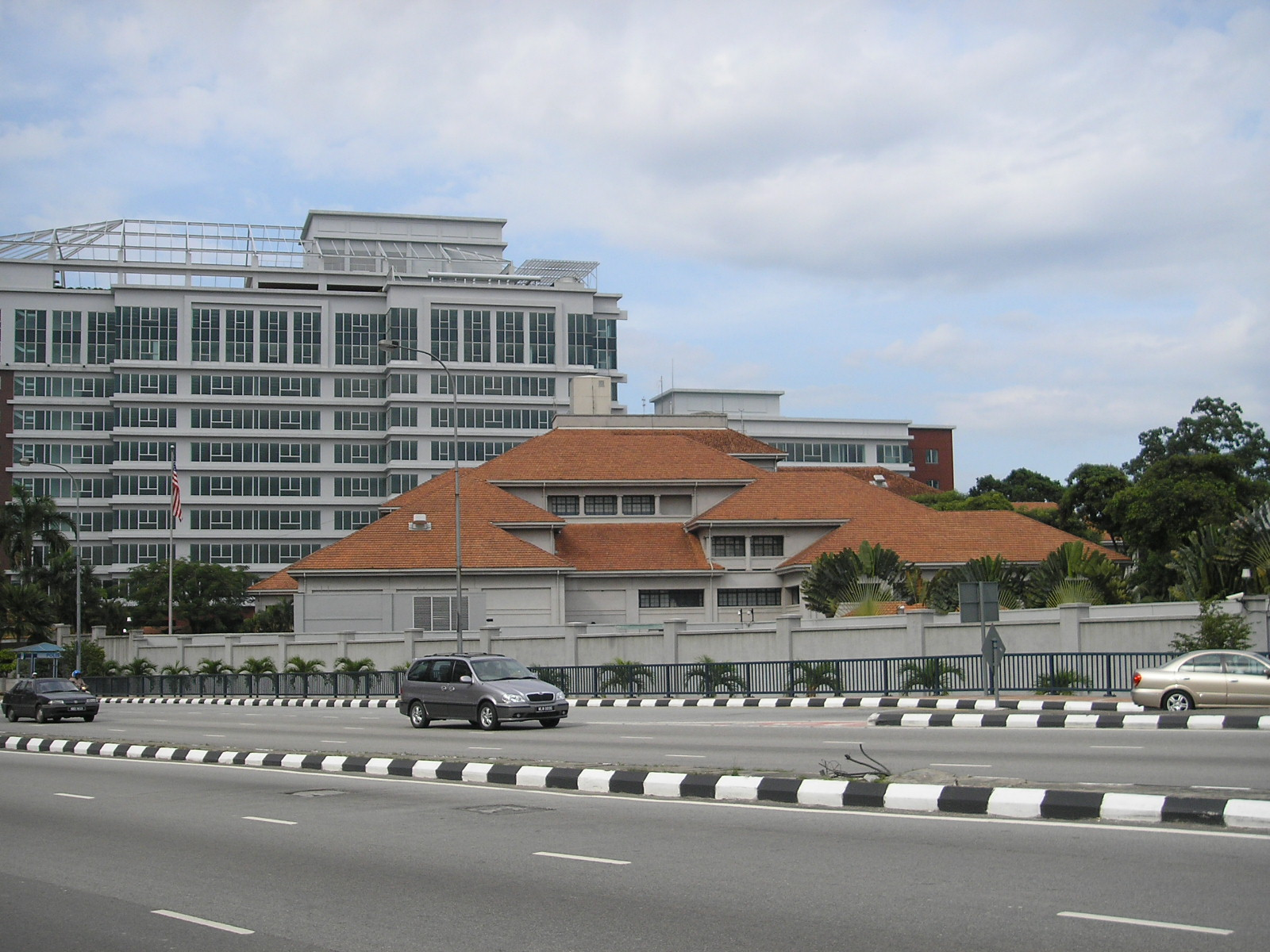
American embassy in Kuala Lumpur.

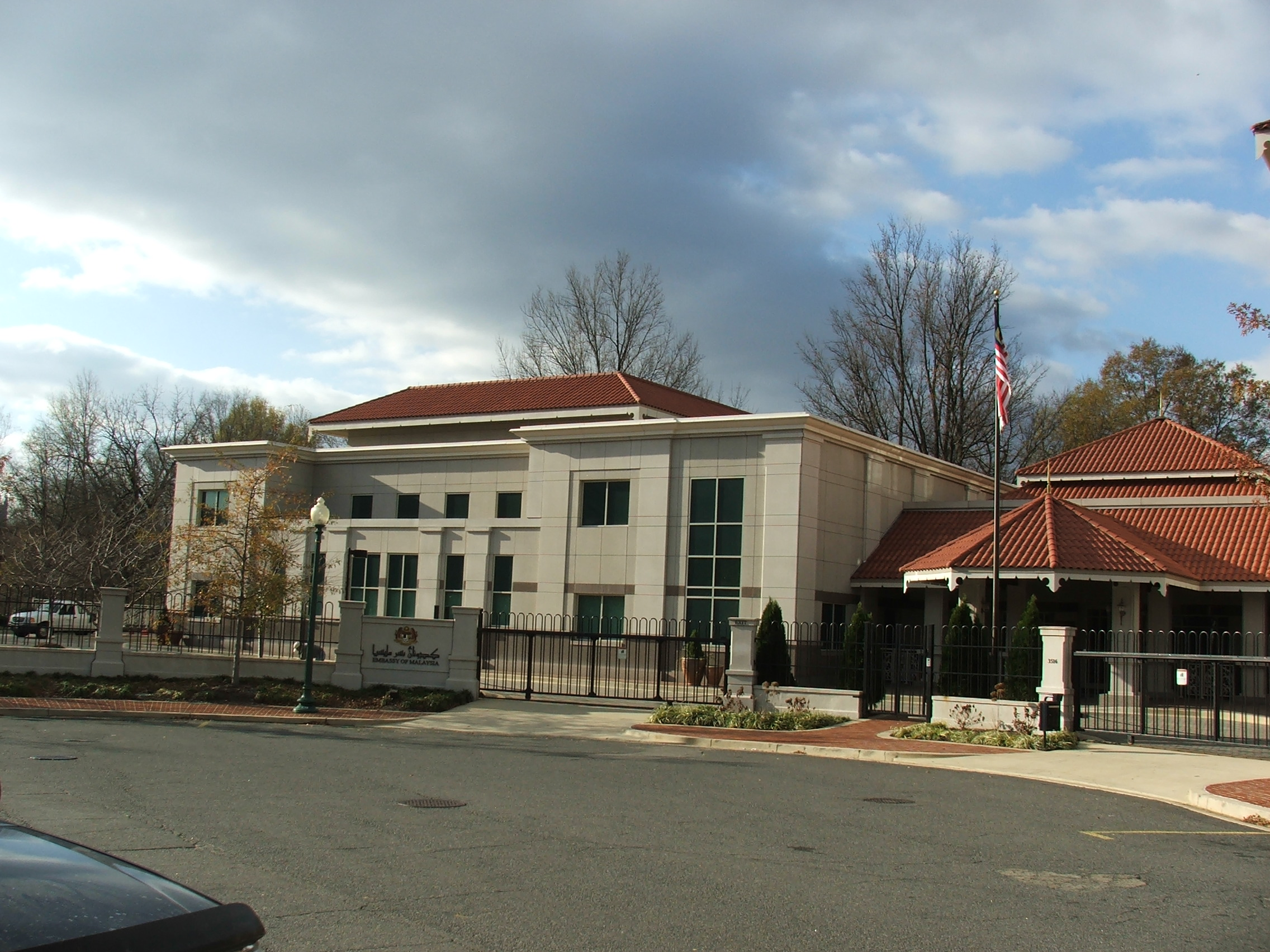
Malaysian embassy in Washington, D.C.

=== American embassy to Malaysia ===
The American embassy in Malaysia is located in Jalan Tun Razak, Kuala Lumpur:

- Ambassador – Edgard D. Kagan

=== Malaysian embassy to the United States ===
- Ambassador – Muhammad Shahrul Ikram Yaakob

== See also ==
- Foreign relations of Malaysia
- Foreign relations of the United States
- Malaysian Americans
