= William Torrey =

There are multiple people named William Torrey:

- William D. Torrey, lawyer and state legislator in Mississippi
- Joseph William Torrey (1828–1885), American merchant
- William Torrey Harris (1835–1909), American educator
- William Torrey (1798–1891) from Manchester Township, New Jersey
- Bill Torrey (1934–2018), Canadian ice hockey executive
