= List of ambassadors of Malaysia to the United States =

Ambassador of Malaysia to the United States
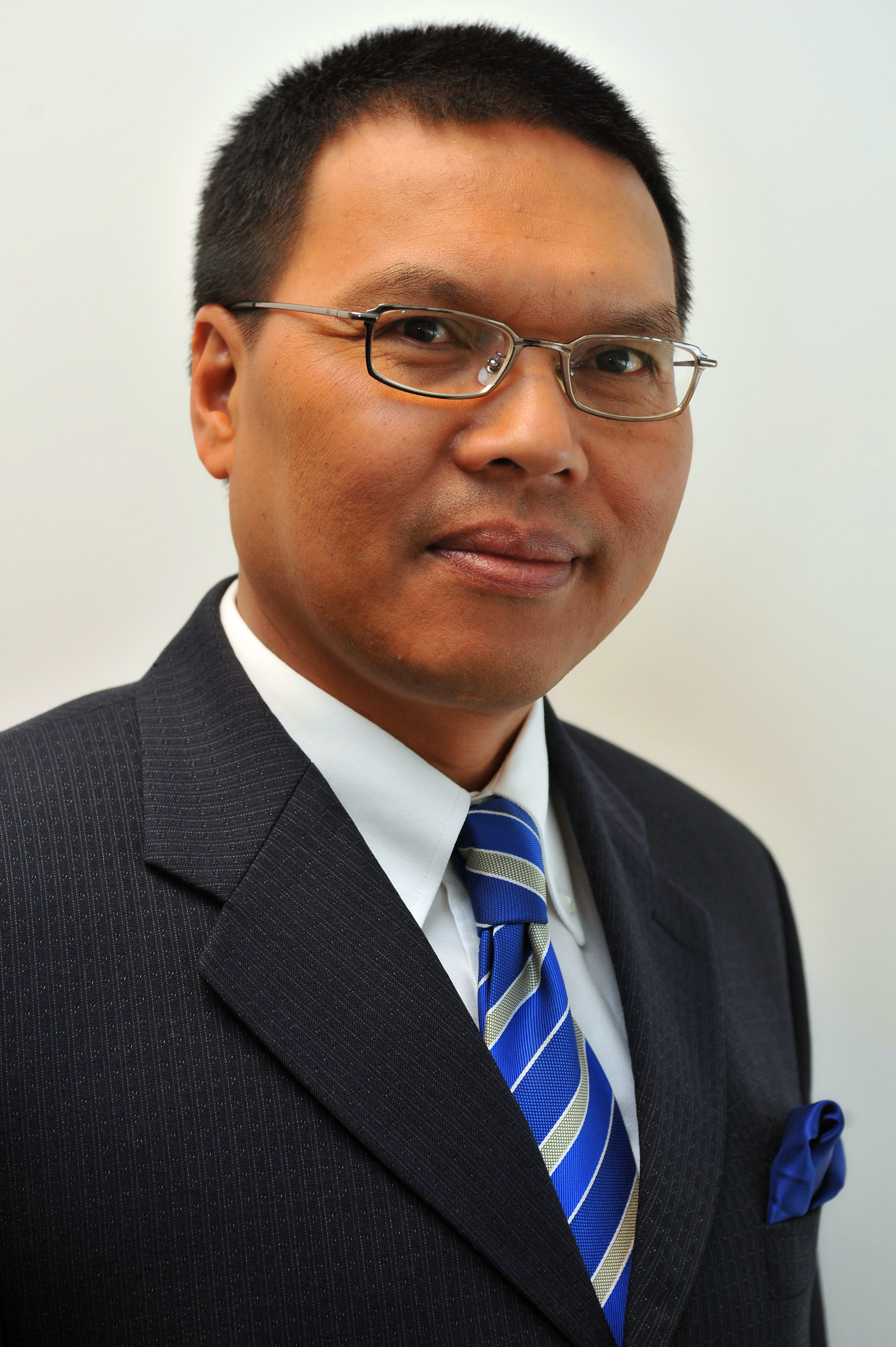
- Incumbent; Muhammad Shahrul Ikram Yaakob since 3 June 2025
- Style: His Excellency
- Seat: Embassy of Malaysia, Washington, D.C., United States
- Appointer: Yang di-Pertuan Agong
- Inaugural holder: Ismail Abdul Rahman
- Formation: September 1957
- Website: www.kln.gov.my/web/usa_washington/home

The ambassador of Malaysia to the United States of America is the head of Malaysia's diplomatic mission to the United States. The position has the rank and status of an ambassador extraordinary and plenipotentiary and is based in the Embassy of Malaysia, Washington, D.C.

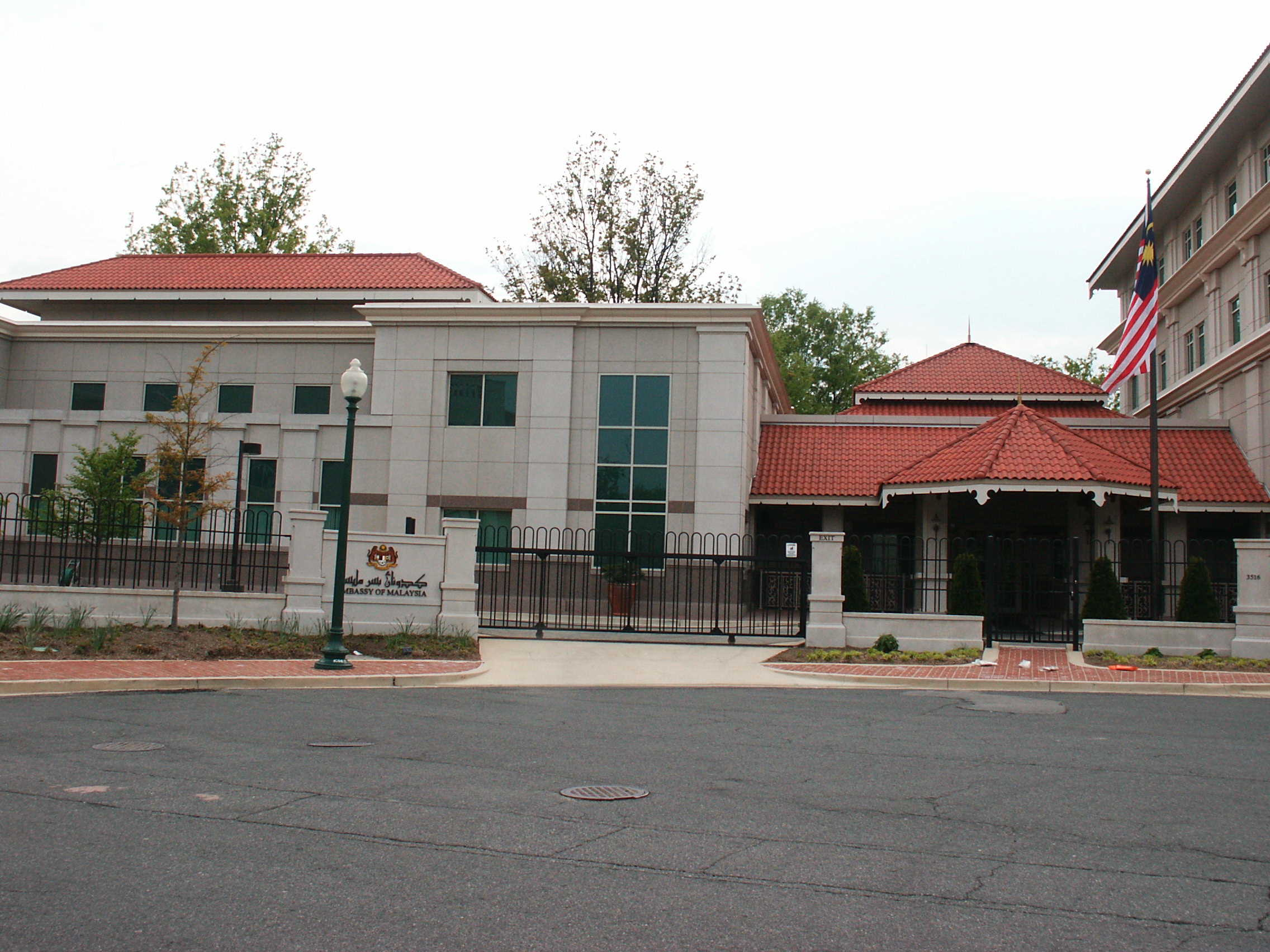
Malaysian Embassy in Washington D.C., United States

== List of heads of mission ==
=== Ambassadors to the United States ===
Ambassador	Term start	Term end
Ismail Abdul Rahman	September 1957	January 1959
Nik Ahmad Kamil Nik Mahmud	February 1959	March 1962
Omar Yoke Lin Ong	June 1962	November 1972
Khir Johari	February 1972	March 1976
Zain Azraai Zainal Abidin	June 1976	November 1983
Lew Sip Hon	January 1984	January 1986
Albert Sextus Talalla	May 1986	January 1991
Abdul Majid Mohamed	June 1991	November 1995
Dali Mahmud Hashim	February 1996	December 1998
Ghazzali Sheikh Abdul Khalid	March 1999	March 2006
Rajmah Hussain	July 2006	June 2008
Jamaluddin Jarjis	September 2009	February 2012
Othman Hashim	April 2012	August 2013
Awang Adek Hussin	April 2014	July 2016
Zulhasnan Rafique	January 2017	April 2018
Azmil Mohd Zabidi	February 2019	August 2021
Mohamed Nazri Abdul Aziz	February 2023	February 2025
Muhammad Shahrul Ikram Yaakob	June 2025	present

== See also ==
- Malaysia–United States relations
