= Egypt–Malaysia relations =

- Egypt: Malaysia

Diplomatic mission
- Egyptian Embassy, Kuala Lumpur: Malaysian Embassy, Cairo

Envoy
- Ambassador Gamal Abdelrehim Mohamed Metwally: Ambassador Zamani Ismail

Egypt–Malaysia relations are foreign relations between Egypt and Malaysia. Egypt has an embassy in Kuala Lumpur, and Malaysia has an embassy in Cairo.

== History ==
Both countries have enjoyed good relations since 1957 due to many Malaysian students studying in Al-Azhar University since decades before even its independence; Egyptian society at the period played a crucial role in Malayan intellectualism especially those from nationalists of the Kaum Muda ("Youth Faction") collective, as well as shaping local journalism culture via translation of Egyptian newspapers. In 1979, President Hosni Mubarak paid an official visit to Malaysia (as a vice-President at the time), while in April 2003 the Malaysian Prime Minister Mahathir Mohamad paid a working visit to Egypt. Before the establishment of the Malaysian embassy in 1960, a Malay Association in Egypt was established in 1930 with the headquarters of the association being a gift from the first President of Egypt Gamal Abdel Nasser in 1959. Since then, bilateral relations between the two countries have been good.

== Economic relations ==
Malaysia's main investment in Egypt is in the gas sector which is operated by Petronas. Currently, both countries are in the process to increase economic co-operation. A Malaysian trade centre has also been planned to be opened and a joint trade commission to be set up. An economic co-operation agreement also has been signed between the two countries regarding joint investments and the enhancement of economic relations between the two countries which are constantly developing. In September 2012, Malaysia, through its Foreign Minister, and Egypt, through Mohamed Kamel Amr, agreed to step up bilateral trade and investment, as well as in the field of technology and energy during the United Nations General Assembly in New York City. Both countries also agreed to have exchange visits by their trade ministers. Kamel Amr expressed Egypt's intention to learn from Malaysia with the intention to develop the country's socio-economy and politics. Malaysia is willing to share its experiences in accelerating the country's development. In the private sector, both Malaysia and Egypt have formed specific working groups which would operated to discuss and address any issues of concern to the private sector of both countries, which includes of the halal standards, conformity assessment activities, SME collaboration and trademarks.

== Resident diplomatic missions ==
- Egypt has an embassy in Kuala Lumpur.
- Malaysia has an embassy in Cairo.

== See also ==
- Foreign relations of Egypt
- Foreign relations of Malaysia
