= Ku Jaafar Ku Shaari =

Malaysian diplomat

Yang Mulia Dato' Ku Jaafar Ku Shaari DSDK AMK
- كو جعفر كو شعري
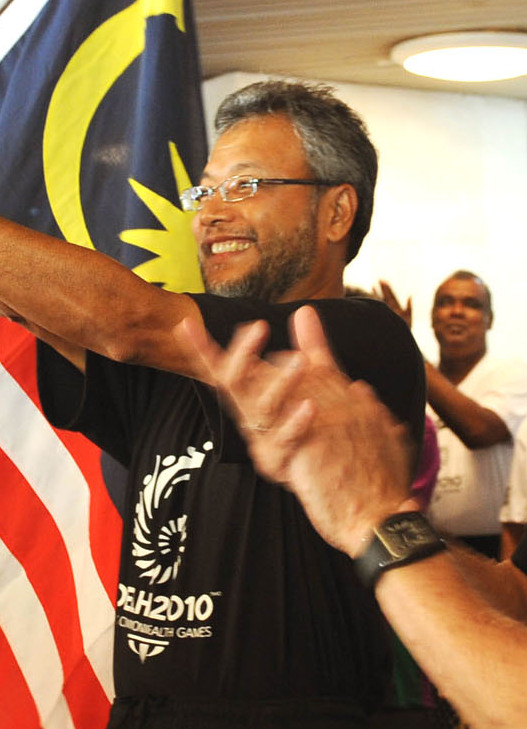
- Ku Jaafar in 2010

5th Secretary General of the D-8 Organization for Economic Cooperation
- In office 1 January 2018 – 1 January 2021
- Preceded by: Seyed Ali Mohammad Mousavi
- Succeeded by: Isiaka Abdulqadir Imam

17th Ambassador of Malaysia to Egypt
- In office September 2013 – March 2017
- Prime Minister: Najib Razak
- Preceded by: Mohd Fakhrudin Abdul Mukti
- Succeeded by: Mohd Haniff Abd Rahman

11th High Commissioner of Malaysia to Brunei
- In office 8 August 2007 – 23 September 2010
- Prime Minister: Abdullah Ahmad Badawi; Najib Razak
- Preceded by: Ali Abdullah
- Succeeded by: Abdullah Sani Omar

1st Ambassador of Malaysia to Qatar
- In office August 2004 – July 2007
- Prime Minister: Abdullah Ahmad Badawi
- Preceded by: Position established
- Succeeded by: Muhammad Shahrul Ikram Yaakob

Personal details
- Born: Ku Jaafar bin Ku Shaari; 1 March 1957 (age 69) Kedah, Malaysia
- Education: University of Malaya (BA)
- Profession: Diplomat
- Ku Jaafar Ku Shaari on LinkedIn

Ku Jaafar bin Ku Shaari (Jawi: كو جعفر كو شعري, Malay pronunciation: [ku jaafar]; born 1 March 1957) is a Malaysian diplomat who last served as the 5th Secretary-General of the D-8 between 2018 and 2021. Apart from that, Ku Jaafar has served as the Ambassador of Malaysia to Egypt and Qatar, and the High Commissioner of Malaysia to Brunei.

== Early life and education ==
Ku Jaafar was born on 1 March 1957 in Kedah, Malaysia. He studied International Relations and attained a Bachelor of Arts at the University of Malaya and later completed a Diploma in Public Administration at the National Institute of Public Administration (INTAN), Malaysia's pioneer and elite agency in training civil servants and diplomatic administrative officers.

== Career ==
Ku Jaafar first started his diplomatic career in 1981. Ku Jaafar has held various ambassadorial positions as a diplomatic administrative officer such as Second Secretary in the High Commission of Malaysia in Ottawa, Canada, Counselor at the Permanent Mission of Malaysia to the United Nations in New York, United States, Chargé d'Affaires in Croatia and Jordan, and Undersecretary for the Organization of Islamic Cooperation (OIC).

His peak career as a diplomat was during his appointment as the 5th Secretary General of the D-8 Organization for Economic Cooperation, becoming the first Malaysian to hold the post. Prior to that, Ku Jaafar was the highest diplomatic envoy of Malaysia to Egypt, Brunei, and Qatar. Ku Jaafar has also served as the Director General for the Malaysian Institute of Diplomacy and Foreign Relations (IDFR). Currently, he sits as the chairman for Al Hidayah Group.

== Honours and awards ==
=== Honours of Malaysia ===
- Malaysia :
  - Officer of the Order of the Defender of the Realm (KMN) (2005)
- Kedah :
  - Knight Companion of the Exalted Order of Kedah (DSDK) – Dato' (2006)
  - Member of the Exalted Order of Kedah (AMK) (2000)
