= List of ambassadors of Malaysia to Qatar =

Ambassador of Malaysia to Qatar
- Incumbent; Zamshari Shaharan since 4 September 2020
- Style: His Excellency
- Seat: Doha, Qatar
- Appointer: Yang di-Pertuan Agong
- Inaugural holder: Ku Jaafar Ku Shaari
- Formation: 1 August 2004
- Website: www.kln.gov.my/web/qat_doha/home

The ambassador of Malaysia to the State of Qatar is the head of Malaysia's diplomatic mission to Qatar. The position has the rank and status of an ambassador extraordinary and plenipotentiary and is based in the Embassy of Malaysia, Doha.

== List of heads of mission ==
=== Ambassadors to Qatar ===
Ambassador	Term start	Term end
Ku Jaafar Ku Shaari	1 August 2004	July 2007
Muhammad Shahrul Ikram Yaakob	6 December 2007	25 May 2010
Ahmad Jazri Mohd Johar	10 April 2011	31 May 2017
Ahmad Fadil Shamsuddin	17 December 2017	23 Feb 2019
Zamshari Shaharan	4 September 2020	Incumbent

== See also ==
- Malaysia–Qatar relations
