= Malaysia–Qatar relations =

- Malaysia: Qatar

Diplomatic mission
- Malaysian Embassy, Doha: Qatari Embassy, Kuala Lumpur

Envoy
- Ambassador Ahmad Fadil Shamsuddin: Ambassador Vacant; Chargé d'affaires a.i. Mansoor Ali Al-Hajri

Malaysia–Qatar relations (Malay: Hubungan Malaysia–Qatar; Jawi: هوبوڠن مليسيا–قطر; Arabic: العلاقات الماليزية القطرية alealaqat almaliziat alqataria) are foreign relations between Malaysia and Qatar. Malaysia has an embassy in Doha, and Qatar has an embassy in Kuala Lumpur since 2004.

== Economic relations ==
The relations between the two countries are mainly economic relations. In 2011, both countries has announced a US$2 billion joint investment fund and the signing of co-operation agreements in the fields of tourism and higher education. Many Malaysians companies also had secured a total of 25 projects in Qatar. While in 2013, the Qatar Airways plans to expand its services into Malaysia by working with the Malaysia Airlines. Qatar also has expressed its interest on the local aviation industry in one of the Malaysian state, Sarawak along with the investments in energy, industry and halal production. In 2018, the two countries signed a memorandum of understanding (MoU) to expand the reach of women entrepreneurs in global markets.

== Resident diplomatic missions ==
- Malaysia has an embassy in Doha.
- Qatar has an embassy in Kuala Lumpur.

== See also ==
- Foreign relations of Malaysia
- Foreign relations of Qatar
