= List of ambassadors of Malaysia to Egypt =

Ambassador of Malaysia to Egypt
- Incumbent; Ambassador Zamani Ismail since 2021
- Style: His Excellency
- Seat: Cairo, Egypt
- Appointer: Yang di-Pertuan Agong
- Inaugural holder: Mohamed Ghazali Jawi
- Formation: 1960
- Website: www.kln.gov.my/web/egy_cairo/home

The ambassador of Malaysia to the Arab Republic of Egypt is the head of Malaysia's diplomatic mission to Egypt. The position has the rank and status of an ambassador extraordinary and plenipotentiary and is based in the Embassy of Malaysia, Cairo.

== List of heads of mission ==
=== Ambassadors to Egypt ===
Ambassador	Term start	Term end
Mohamed Ghazali Jawi	1960	1963
Tuanku Ja'afar Tuanku Abdul Rahman	1963	1965
Yaacob Abdul Latiff	September 1965	October 1967
Abdul Rahman Talib	January 1968	October 1968
Abdul Hamid Jumat	January 1969	November 1970
Abdul Khalid Awang Osman	January 1971	March 1974
Shahuddin Mohd Taib	May 1974	December 1977
Hassan Adli bin Arshad	November 1978	October 1981
Abdullah Zawawi Mohamed	October 1982	March 1986
Raja Mansur Raja Razman	January 1987	1991
Zainal Azman Zainal Abidin	November 1991	November 1995
Abdul Rahman Bin Rahim	June 1996	November 1997
M.N. Azman	March 1998	January 2001
Abu Bakar Daud	February 2001	June 2004
Zainal Abidin Ab. Kadir	May 2005	May 2009
Mohd Fakhrudin Abdul Mukti	July 2009	2013
Ku Jaafar Ku Shaari	September 2013	
Mohd Haniff Abd Rahman	2018	Incumbent
Zamani Ismail	October 2021	

== See also ==
- Egypt–Malaysia relations
