= Muhammad Shahrul Ikram Yaakob =

Malaysian diplomat and civil servant

Tuan Yang Terutama Tan Sri Dato' Sri Muhammad Shahrul Ikram Yaakob PSM PJN SSAP DSAP DIMP SAP AAP
- محمد شهرول اكرام يعقوب
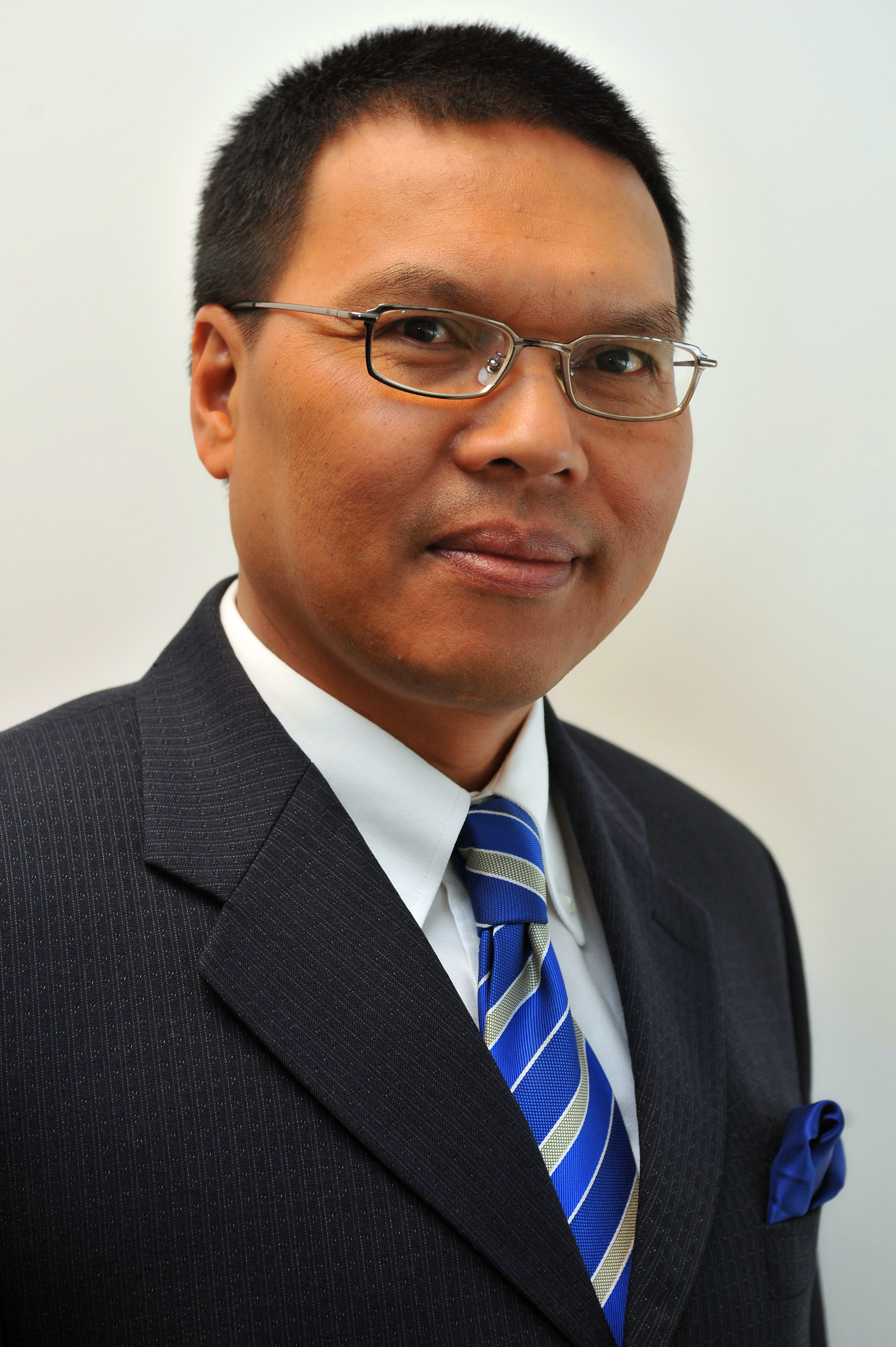
- Muhammad Shahrul Ikram in 2010

18th Malaysian Ambassador to the United States
- Incumbent
- Assumed office 3 June 2025
- Monarch: Ibrahim Iskandar
- Prime Minister: Anwar Ibrahim
- Preceded by: Mohamed Nazri Abdul Aziz

Secretary-General of the Ministry of Foreign Affairs of Malaysia
- In office 6 January 2019 – 31 May 2022
- Monarchs: Nazrin Shah (acting); Abdullah
- Prime Minister: Mahathir Mohamad; Muhyiddin Yassin; Ismail Sabri Yaakob
- Preceded by: Ramlan Ibrahim
- Succeeded by: Amran Mohamed Zin

Director-General of the ASEAN–Malaysia National Secretariat
- In office 11 October 2013 – 10 January 2016
- Monarch: Abdul Halim
- Prime Minister: Najib Razak
- Preceded by: Zainuddin Yahya
- Succeeded by: Jojie Samuel M. C. Samuel

2nd Ambassador of Malaysia to Qatar
- In office 6 December 2007 – 25 May 2010
- Monarchs: Mizan Zainal Abidin; Abdul Halim
- Prime Minister: Abdullah Ahmad Badawi; Najib Razak
- Preceded by: Ku Jaafar Ku Shaari
- Succeeded by: Ahmad Jazri Mohd Johar

Chairman of the Board of Governors of the International Atomic Energy Agency
- In office February 2010 – September 2010
- Preceded by: Arshad M. Hussain
- Succeeded by: Ansar Pervaiz

Personal details
- Born: Muhammad Shahrul Ikram bin Yaakob; 21 May 1961 (age 65) Bentong, Pahang, Malaysia
- Citizenship: Malaysian
- Spouse: Izdina Izaidin
- Children: 4
- Education: University of Malaya (BSc); National Institute of Public Administration (DPA)
- Occupation: Diplomat, civil servant

Muhammad Shahrul Ikram bin Yaakob (Jawi: محمد شهرول اكرام بن يعقوب; born 21 May 1961) is a Malaysian diplomat who has served as the 18th Ambassador of Malaysia to the United States since June 2025. He also served as the Secretary-General of the Ministry of Foreign Affairs of Malaysia from January 2019 until May 2022, succeeded Ramlan Ibrahim.

== Early life and education ==
Muhammad Shahrul Ikram bin Yaakob was born in Bentong, Pahang, Malaysia on 21 May 1961. He received his Bachelor of Science (BSc) (Ecology) from the University of Malaya (UM). He also attended the National Institute of Public Administration to obtain the Postgraduate Diploma in Public Management (DPA), successfully graduated as the Administrative and Diplomatic Officer (PTD).

== Diplomatic career ==
Muhammad Shahrul Ikram began his career in the Malaysian Administrative and Diplomatic Service on 12 January 1988, when he was appointed to the Ministry of Foreign Affairs. He was first posted as Assistant Secretary in the East Asia Division, where he was responsible for managing bilateral relations between Malaysia and China, the Democratic People’s Republic of Korea (DPRK), and Mongolia. During this period, he also served as Secretary to the Committee on Managed and Controlled Relationship with the People’s Republic of China.

From 1989 to 1991, he was reassigned as Assistant Secretary in the International Organisations Division, where his portfolio included matters concerning the Commonwealth and the United Nations Security Council (UNSC). On 5 May 1991, he was posted to the Embassy of Malaysia in Beijing, People’s Republic of China, where he served as Second Secretary. He was later transferred to the Embassy of Malaysia in Washington, D.C., United States, where he assumed the role of First Secretary (Economics) on 24 June 1994.

Upon returning to Malaysia, he was appointed as Senior Assistant Secretary I in the American Affairs Division on 12 January 1998. In this role, he was responsible for monitoring bilateral relations and preparing analytical reports and policy recommendations on Malaysia’s relations with the United States, Canada, and countries in northern America. He was promoted to Principal Assistant Secretary in the same division on 15 February 1999.

On 9 March 2002, he was assigned to the Embassy of Malaysia in Vienna, Austria. There, he served as Deputy Head of Mission and was concurrently accredited to the Slovakia. He also held the positions of Alternate Resident Representative of Malaysia to the International Atomic Energy Agency (IAEA) and Deputy Permanent Representative of Malaysia to the United Nations Office in Vienna.

During his posting in Vienna, he undertook several significant multilateral assignments. He served as Chairman of the Non-Aligned Movement (NAM) Working Group on the Comprehensive Nuclear-Test-Ban Treaty (CTBT) from 2003 to 2005, during Malaysia’s chairmanship of the NAM. In 2003, he was also assigned by the Ministry of Foreign Affairs of Malaysia as Secretary to the Political Committee of the NAM Summit in Kuala Lumpur. In 2006, he chaired the drafting committee on nuclear and disarmament issues during the NAM Coordinating Bureau Ministerial Meeting held in Kuala Lumpur. That same year, during the Sixth Review Conference of the Biological Weapons Convention (BWC) in Geneva, he was entrusted by Ambassador Masood Khan, President of the Conference, to chair one of the informal consultation groups.

On 12 September 2005, he returned to Malaysia to serve as Undersecretary for the Multilateral Political Division. In this capacity, he was responsible for a range of issues including disarmament, non-proliferation, terrorism, transnational organized crime, the Commonwealth, and Malaysia’s engagement with the IAEA. From September 2005 to November 2007, he also chaired the National Inter-agency Working Group on Disarmament and Non-Proliferation and the National Inter-Agency Working Group on Export Controls.

In December 2007, he was appointed as the 2nd Ambassador of Malaysia to the State of Qatar, a position he held until May 2010. During his tenure, he also served as the Governor of the Board of Governors of the International Atomic Energy Agency (IAEA) from 2009 to 2010. From February to September 2010, he continued to represent Malaysia as Governor and Chairman of the IAEA Board of Governors.

He was later involved in organizing high-level international dialogues. In 2007, he served as Chairman of the Substantive Committee of the Langkawi International Dialogue (LID), when the Ministry of Foreign Affairs of Malaysia hosted the event for the first time. He was also part of the Malaysian delegation to the United Nations General Assembly in 2006 and 2007.

On 11 October 2013, he was appointed Director General of the ASEAN–Malaysia National Secretariat, a post he held until 10 January 2016.

In January 2019, he served as the Secretary-General of the Ministry of Foreign Affairs of Malaysia, until May 2022, where he succeeded Ramlan Ibrahim.

In late May 2025, he was selected as the 18th Ambassador of Malaysia to the United States, succeeding Mohamed Nazri Abdul Aziz. In late July 2026, the United States Department of State summoned Muhammad over Malaysia's policy of barring Israeli citizens entry to the country.

== Personal life ==
Muhammad Shahrul Ikram is married to Izdina Izaidin and they have 4 sons. He is fluent to Malay, English, and he speaks some basic Mandarin and basic German.

== Honours ==
=== Honours of Malaysia ===
- Malaysia
  - Commander of the Order of Loyalty to the Crown of Malaysia (PSM) – Tan Sri (2021)
  - Commander of the Order of Meritorious Service (PJN) – Datuk (2020)
- Pahang
  - Grand Knight of the Order of Sultan Ahmad Shah of Pahang (SSAP) – Dato' Sri (2017)
  - Knight Companion of the Order of Sultan Ahmad Shah of Pahang (DSAP) – Dato' (2014)
  - Knight Companion of the Order of the Crown of Pahang (DIMP) – Dato' (2007)
  - Companion of the Order of Sultan Ahmad Shah of Pahang (SAP) (2006)
  - Member of the Order of Sultan Ahmad Shah of Pahang (AAP) (2004)
