= Thomas Bradley Harris =

American businessman

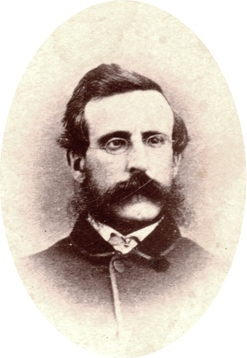

Vice Governor of Ellena †
- In office November 24, 1865 – May 22, 1866
- Appointed by: Sultan Abdul Momin
- Governor: Joseph William Torrey

Personal details
- Born: October 29, 1826 New York, New York, United States
- Died: May 22, 1866 (aged 39) Ellena colony, Borneo
- Spouse: Sarah Louisa Seymour
- Parent: James Harris

Thomas Bradley Harris (October 29, 1826 in New York City; – May 22, 1866 in Ellena, Borneo) was an American businessman and co-founder of the American colony of "Ellena" together with Joseph William Torrey on the island of Borneo.

== Early life ==
Harris was born in New York on October 29, 1826. He was a professional merchant for ship equipment at the corner of South Street and Maiden Lane. At the first, he was working alone but later with his business partner named Nathan Gilette Pond, where they established the Harris & Pond company. The business premises had already opened by his father in 1805, and since working there they began to exported large quantities of butter to British Hong Kong. This export business was so successful that the trademark was soon copied by other exporters and stuck on its own goods.

== Further career ==
In 1862, Harris left New York to set up his own branch of business in Hong Kong and put an end to unfair business competition in his country. He left his wife Sarah Louisa née Seymour and his children in Walton, New York, where his father James Harris had already retired from the company in 1857.

=== Ellena Colony ===
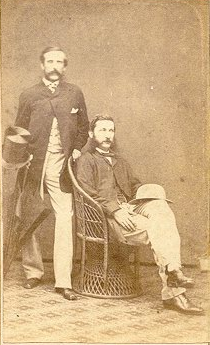
Harris (standing left) and Joseph William Torrey (sitting right).

In August 1865, the American consul in Brunei, Charles Lee Moses (Note: In the literature, there is also the name Claude Lee Moses; but in the treatise with Sultan Abdul Mumin, which was notarially attested by Moses, he himself uses the first name Charles.) concluded a 10-year lease with the Sultan Abdul Momin and his successor, Pengiran Temenggung Hashim who guaranteed land rights in various areas in the north of Borneo.

Looking for a quick profit, the consul immediately sought buyers for his concessions following the signing of the lease. He raised the interest among his countrymen including Joseph William Torrey and Harris. In October 1865, Torrey and Harris, together with Chinese lenders Lee Assing and Pong Ampong under the American Trading Company of Borneo decided to build a colony in the area of today's Kimanis. Taking note of the fact that the acquisition of the concession of Moses was also recognized by the Sultan of Brunei, Torrey made a new concession letter drawn up on November 24, 1865 at the Brunei Palace provided with the seals of the Sultan and three of his ministers. In December 1865, Torrey with 12 Americans and 60 Chinese founded the colony of "Ellena" with Harris was appointed as vice-governor.

The position of Ellenas in the mouth of the sluggish Kimanis River was unfortunate and favored the outbreak of malaria and other diseases. Ellena soon failed as the colony lacked a solid financial base, and Torrey was forced to leave his own colony to Harris a while to look for investors in Hong Kong and Shanghai.

== Later life and death ==
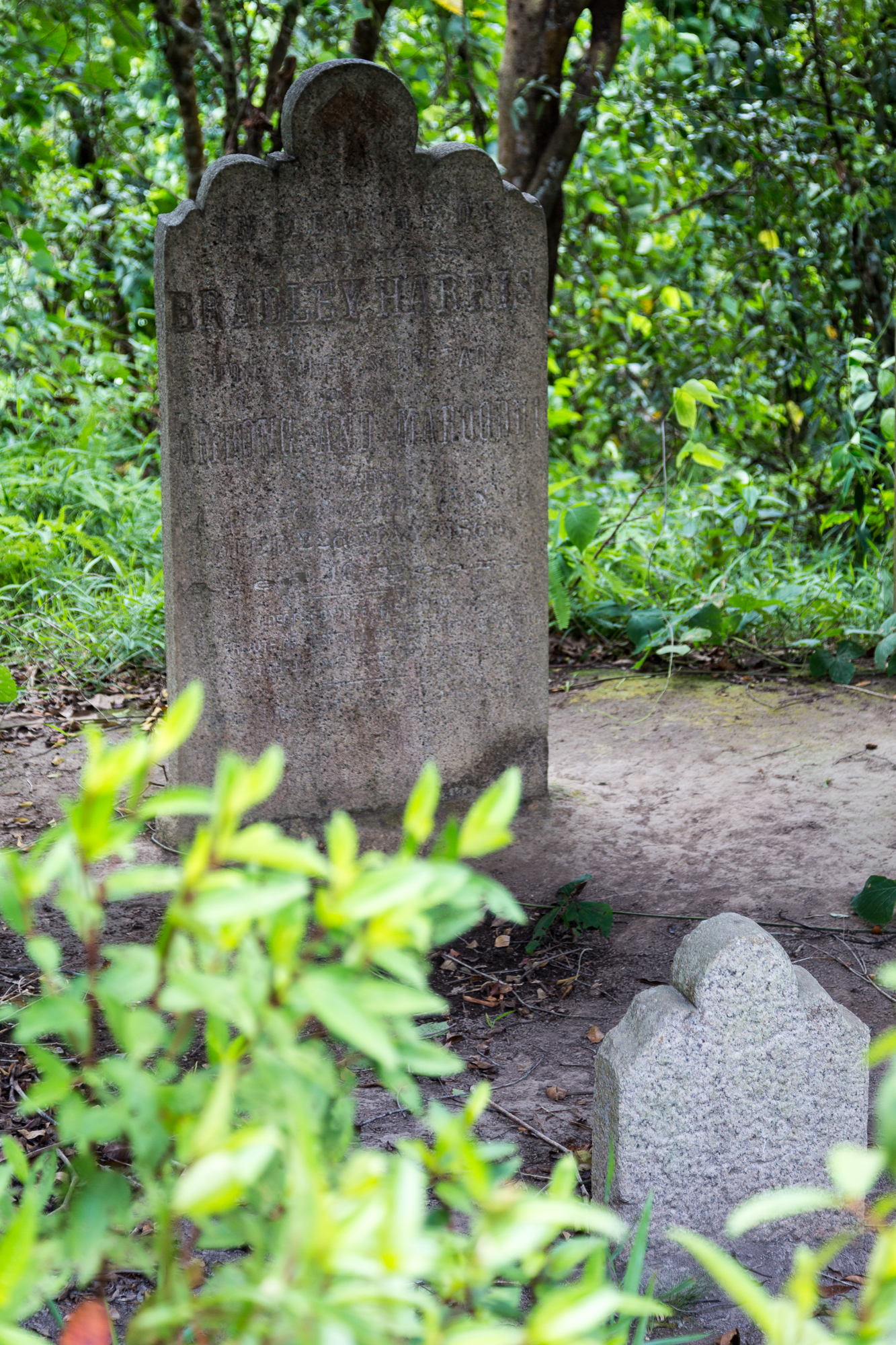
Harris grave at the "Governor’s Hill" in Kimanis.

Harris however died of malaria on May 22, 1866 while Torrey was in Hong Kong trying to raise additional funds for their colony.

Torrey buried him on the top of a nearby hill, now known as Governor's Hill where Harris had built his house on the slopes of the hill and laid a path down to the jetty by the river. A powerful granite block, which is said to require six water buffaloes to carry it in a two-days effort from a nearby quarry to the grave, marks his last retirement. Torrey made the following inscription to this tombstone:

In Memory of
Thomas
Bradley Harris
Hon. Chief Secretary of
the Colony of
Ambong and Maroodu.
By Birth
a Citizen of the U.S.A.
Died 22 May 1866.
Aged 40 Years.
Erected by the Rajah
A Tribute of Respect to the Memory of An Old,
Faithful and Esteemed Friend.
“After Life’s Fitful Fever, He Sleeps Well.”

The coffin with the mortal remains was exhumed shortly afterwards and brought back to the United States.
