= American Trading Company of Borneo =

Trading company

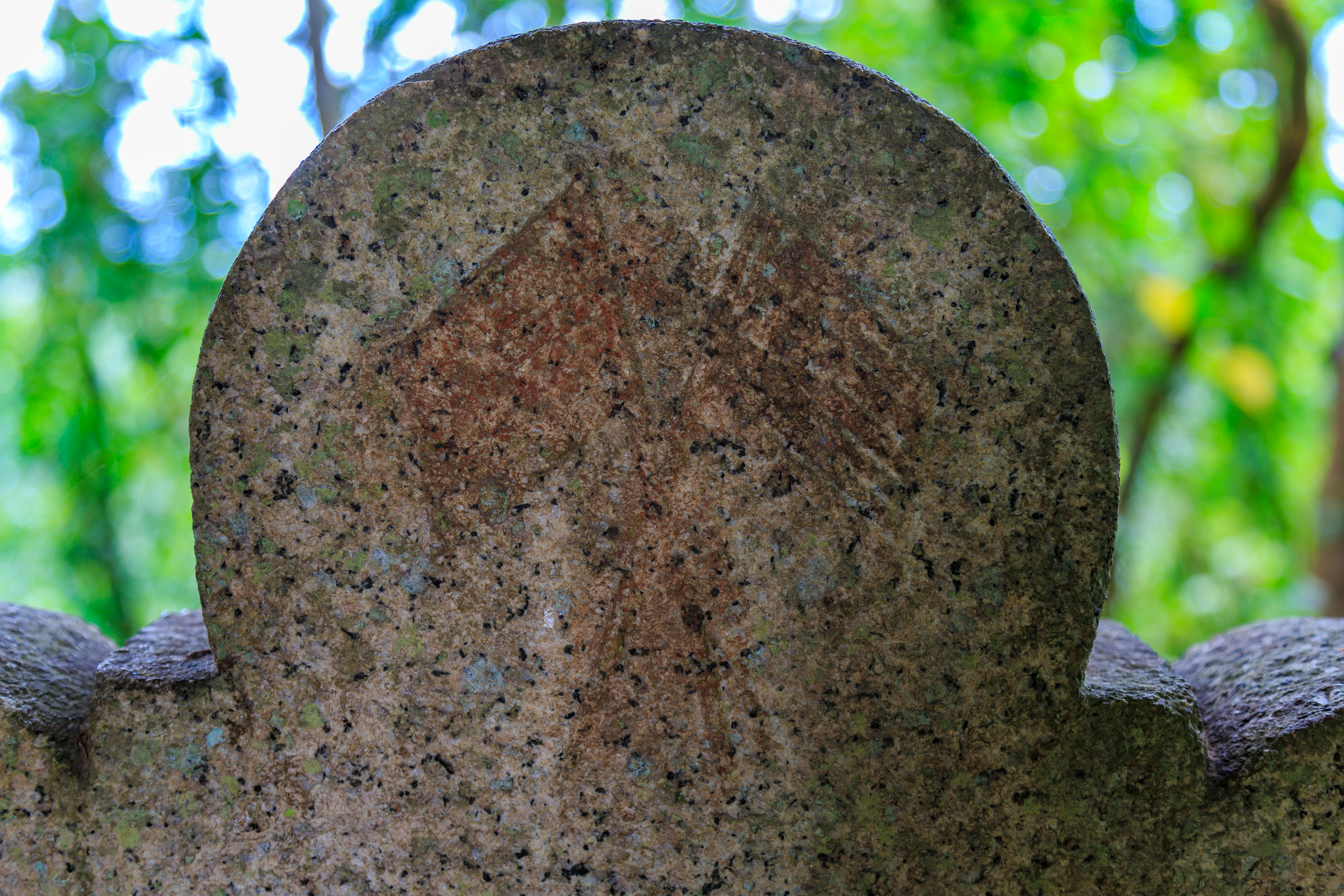
- The only known flag of Ellena on the gravestone of Thomas Bradley Harris
- Industry: Trade and colonization
- Founded: 1865 in Brunei
- Founder: Joseph William Torrey, Thomas Bradley Harris, Chinese investors
- Defunct: 1881
- Fate: Concession sold to Baron von Overbeck
- Headquarters: Kimanis, present-day Malaysia
- Area served: North Borneo

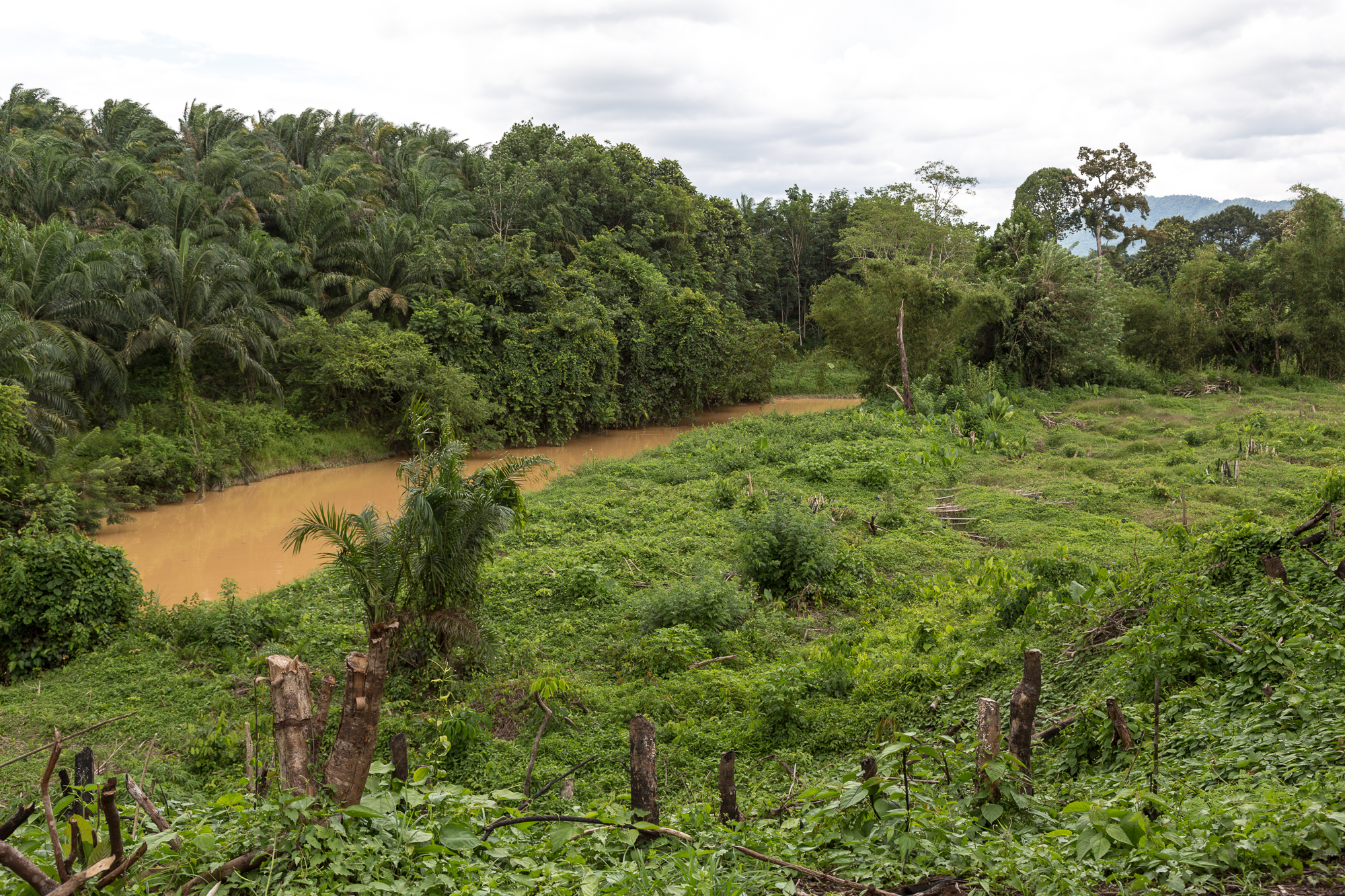
The present-day area of "Ellena", once a colony of the United States in present-day Kimanis, Sabah, Malaysia.

The American Trading Company of Borneo was a company formed by Joseph William Torrey, Thomas Bradley Harris and several Chinese investors shortly after the acquisition over a parcel of land in northern Borneo from the Sultanate of Brunei. The first American settlement in the area soon was named Ellena, although it was abandoned later due to financial difficulties, diseases and riots among the workers.

== History ==
In 1850, the United States and Brunei signed a commercial treaty, that was activated in 1865. Out of this agreement, in August 1865, Charles Lee Moses, (Note: In the literature, there is also the name Claude Lee Moses; but in the treatise with Sultan Abdul Mumin, which was notarially attested by Moses, he himself uses the first name Charles.) the US First Consul to the sultanate, secured a 10-year lease of a large territorial concession in North Borneo from Sultan Abdul Momin and his successor, Pengiran Temenggung. The grant was part of the Sultan's strategy to resolve internal power struggles, and combat rising issues of rebellion and piracy in North Borneo. Looking to make a profit, Moses immediately sought buyers for his concessions following the signing of the lease. Moses' bid raised interest among his countrymen, including American merchants Joseph Torrey and Thomas Harris, who were based in Hong Kong. Blessed with exuberant reports of a land rich in gold, diamonds, precious stones, spices, and treasures waiting to be delivered to the markets of Hong Kong and China, they purchased the concession from Moses in September 1865.

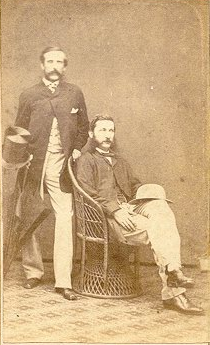
Thomas Bradley Harris (standing left) and Torrey (sitting right).

In October 1865, Torrey and Harris, together with Chinese lenders Lee Assing and Pong Ampong, founded the American Trading Company of Borneo planning to establish a colony at Kimanis and profit from plantation agriculture. Since the concession had been granted to Moses, Torrey arranged for a new concession letter, drawn up on November 24, 1865, at Brunei Palace, and sealed by the Sultan and three of his ministers. The document confirmed his concession acquisition and guaranteed that Torrey was the ruler of life and death, with the Sultan granting him the title of "Rajah of Ambong and Marudu". (Note: The decisive section on page 2 of his license certificate is: and do hereby nominate and appoint Joseph William Torrey Supreme Ruler and Governor of the above named territory with the title of Rajah of Ambong and Maloodoo with power of life and death over the inhabitants with all the rights of property vested in us over the productions of the country whether mineral (with the exception of coal at Benoni and Kimanis only) vegetable or animal – with the rights of making laws, coining money, creating an army and navy for their own protection, or for the suppression of piracy in their area or adjacent waters and commissioning the officers thereof, levying custom rates on foreign vessels or people and other dues on the inhabitants as to him may seem good and expedient, together with all other forces and rights usually and exercised by, and belonging to Sovereign Rulers: - and we call upon all foreign nations with whom we have formed friendly treaties and alliances to acknowledge the said Rajah as ourself in the above territories and to respect this authority therein – and in case of the death or retirement from office of this said Rajah then his successor in the office of President of the above Company shall succeed.) This earned Torrey the nickname of "Yankee Rajah".

In December 1865, Torrey, along with 12 Americans and 60 Chinese, founded the colony of 'Ellena' and appointed himself as governor, with Harris as vice-governor. However, his plans to make Ellena attractive to further settlers by cultivating sugarcane, tobacco, and rice soon failed due to the colony's poor location at the mouth of the sluggish Kimanis River, which facilitated outbreaks of malaria and other diseases. The colony also lacked a solid financial base forcing Torrey to temporarily leave the colony in Harris' care while he looked for investors in Hong Kong and Shanghai. While Torrey desperately tried to raise additional funds in Hong Kong for his colony in Borneo, his friend Harris died of malaria on May 22, 1866.

As early as 1866, the American colony was abandoned due to a lack of capital, a lack of labor, riots among the workers, and serious diseases. The failure of Ellena left Torrey penniless, while Moses still had not received payment for the concession purchase. However, nine years later, just before the end of the ten-year lease, the group succeeded in selling all rights to Baron von Overbeck from Germany in January 1876 in Hong Kong. The purchase price of $15,000 was contingent upon obtaining within nine months an extension of the concessions from the Sultan of Brunei.

== See also ==
- British North Borneo Company
