= Joseph William Torrey =

American merchant in Southeast Asia (1828–1885)

His Majesty, the Yankee Rajah Joseph William Torrey Rajah of Ambong and Maroodu
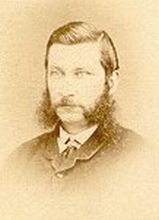

United States Vice-consul to Siam
- In office 1877–1880

Governor of Ellena
- In office November 24, 1865 – January 1876
- Appointed by: Sultan Abdul Momin
- Succeeded by: Baron Overbeck

Personal details
- Born: April 22, 1828 Bath, Maine, United States
- Died: June 22, 1885 (aged 57) Boston, Massachusetts, United States
- Parents: Joseph Gendall Torrey; Emeline Adams

Military service
- Branch/service: Ancient and Honorable Artillery Company of Massachusetts
- Rank: Colonel

Joseph William Torrey, Rajah of Ambong and Marudu, (April 22, 1828, in Bath, Maine – June 22, 1885, in Boston, Massachusetts) was an American merchant, president of the American Trading Company of Borneo and co-founder of the American colony 'Ellena' (in present-day Kimanis) together with Thomas Bradley Harris on the island of Borneo. He was known as "Yankee Rajah" and served as a U.S. vice-consul to Siam.

== Early life ==
Torrey was born on April 22, 1828, in Bath, Maine, the son of Joseph Gendall Torrey and his second wife, Emeline (née Adams). His father, a printer, founded the Maine Gazette, Bath's first newspaper. In 1834, the family moved to Roxbury, Massachusetts, a town adjacent to and later annexed by Boston. Torrey graduated from the Boston High School under Rev. Dr. Leach. At first, he also learned the printing business and worked for several years in the company of his father, which brought him into contact with the satirical magazine, The Carpet-Bag, created and edited by Benjamin Penhallow Shillaber. Torrey served in several military companies and was a member of the Ancient and Honorable Artillery Company of Massachusetts. However, the authenticity of his military grade "Colonel" is questioned. (Note: The very detailed genealogy of the Torrey family, which also provides very precise evidence for the military career of the family members, also leave the issue on his involvement in military in questions.)

== Further career ==
In 1853, he left Boston and went to Melbourne, Australia, where he worked as a clerk at Caldwell, Train & Co., Commission Merchants and Steam Packet Agents. He was also a member of Torrey & Foodrich and Company, Discharging Clerks. In addition to his work, he began studying law; although it was not known if he received an academic degree in law. In Melbourne, he joined the Masonic lodge and later became the Grand Master. On September 22, 1854, he married Eliza Lydia Ewer (1831–1859) in Melbourne. The couple had two children, Emiline Eliza (1856–1948) and Cordelia Grace (1858–1947). One year after the birth of their second child, Eliza died after a short illness at the age of 27. Eliza's parents brought the children to Roxbury, Massachusetts, a voyage that Emeline said many years later took six months. The girls were taken in and raised by their paternal grandparents.

In 1859, Torrey was declared insolvent by the Supreme Court of Victoria and his estate was turned over to the Commissioner of Insolvent Estates. In 1860, Torrey moved to British Hong Kong, where he became the editor of The China Mail, the first British daily newspaper in Hong Kong. He later took over the publication of the Hong Kong Times. In 1862, he joined Montgomery & Parker as a ship broker and commissioner. In 1863, Torrey married again. His second wife, the widow Mrs. Charlotte Ann Lemon (née Mills, 1817–1908), bore him a son Joseph Gendall (September 16, 1864 – October 25, 1935) and a daughter named Elena Charlotte (1866–1937). He later bought his own ship from the ship broker company, which he baptized as Ellen - probably named after his youngest daughter.

=== Foundation of the Ellena Colony ===
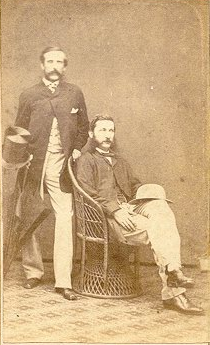
Thomas Bradley Harris (standing left) and Torrey (sitting right).

In August 1865, Charles Lee Moses, (Note: In the literature, there is also the name Claude Lee Moses; but in the treatise with Sultan Abdul Mumin, which was notarially attested by Moses, he himself uses the first name Charles.) the American consul in Brunei, concluded a 10-year lease with the Sultan Abdul Momin and his successor, Pengiran Temenggung who guaranteed land rights in various areas in the north of Borneo. Looking for a quick profit, the consul immediately sought buyers for his concessions following the signing of the lease. Moses bid raised the interest among his countrymen including Torrey himself and Thomas Bradley Harris. Blessed with exuberant reports of a land rich in gold, diamonds, precious stones, spices and treasures waiting to be delivered to the markets of Hong Kong and China, they bought the concessions of Moses in September 1865.

In October 1865, Torrey and Harris, together with Chinese lenders Lee Assing and Pong Ampong under the American Trading Company of Borneo decided to build a colony in the area of today's Kimanis. Taking note of the fact that the acquisition of the concession of Moses was also recognized by the Sultan of Brunei, Torrey made a new concession letter drawn up on November 24, 1865, at the Brunei Palace provided with the seals of the Sultan and three of his ministers. The document confirms his concession acquisition which is not only guaranteed for Torrey to be the ruler of life and death, but the Sultan even gave him the title of "Rajah of Ambong and Marudu". (Note: The decisive section on page 2 of his license certificate is: and do hereby nominate and appoint Joseph William Torrey Supreme Ruler and Governor of the above named territory with the title of Rajah of Ambong and Maloodoo with power of life and death over the inhabitants with all the rights of property vested in us over the productions of the country whether mineral (with the exception of coal at Benoni and Kimanis only) vegetable or animal – with the rights of making laws, coining money, creating an army and navy for their own protection, or for the suppression of piracy in their area or adjacent waters and commissioning the officers thereof, levying custom rates on foreign vessels or people and other dues on the inhabitants as to him may seem good and expedient, together with all other forces and rights usually and exercised by, and belonging to Sovereign Rulers: - and we call upon all foreign nations with whom we have formed friendly treaties and alliances to acknowledge the said Rajah as ourself in the above territories and to respect this authority therein – and in case of the death or retirement from office of this said Rajah then his successor in the office of President of the above Company shall succeed.)

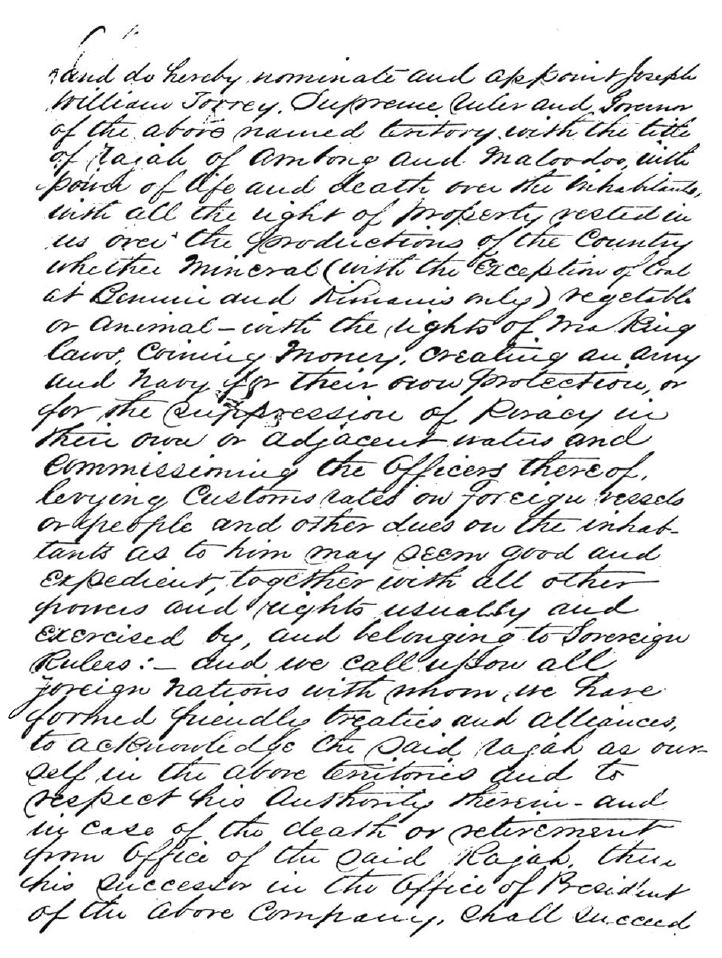
Page 2 of the concession of Torrey with his appointment as Rajah by the Sultan of Brunei.

In December 1865, Torrey, along with 12 Americans and 60 Chinese, founded the colony of 'Ellena' and appointed himself as governor, then bestowed by His Majesty the Sultan of Brunei as the Rajah of Ambong and Marudu, and Harris as vice-governor. His plans to make Ellena attractive to further settlers by cultivating sugarcane, tobacco and rice failed soon after. This was mainly caused by the unfortunate choice of Ellena's location at the mouth of the sluggish Kimanis River, which favored the outbreak of malaria and other diseases. The colony also lacked a solid financial base which meant that Torrey was forced to temporarily leave his own colony to his deputy, Harris to look for investors in Hong Kong and Shanghai.

While Torrey desperately tried to raise additional funds in Hong Kong for his colony in Borneo, his friend Harris died of malaria on May 22, 1866.

As early as 1866, the American colony was abandoned because of a lack of capital, a lack of labor, riots among the workers and serious diseases. The end of Ellena left Torrey penniless. Driven on the one hand by the predominantly Chinese investors, unlike Charles Lee Moses who was still waiting for the payment of the purchase price, he tried to continue selling his rights profitably. However, only nine years later, just before the ten-year term expired, Torrey succeeded in selling all rights to Baron von Overbeck from Germany in January 1876 in Hong Kong. The purchase price of $15,000 was linked to the condition that within nine months it was necessary to obtain an extension of the concessions from the ruler of Brunei.

=== Diplomatic service ===
From 1877 to 1880, Torrey was a vice-consul at the U.S. Consulate in Siam (present-day Thailand). In his capacity as a vice-consul, he also belonged to the American delegation who accompanied ex-President Ulysses S. Grant during his visit to meet Chulalongkorn, the king of Siam. It seems, however, that Torrey presence was not well-liked by all, as he could not arrange with his superior. After his resignation as vice-consul, he remained a member of the American Legation in Bangkok.

== Later life and death ==
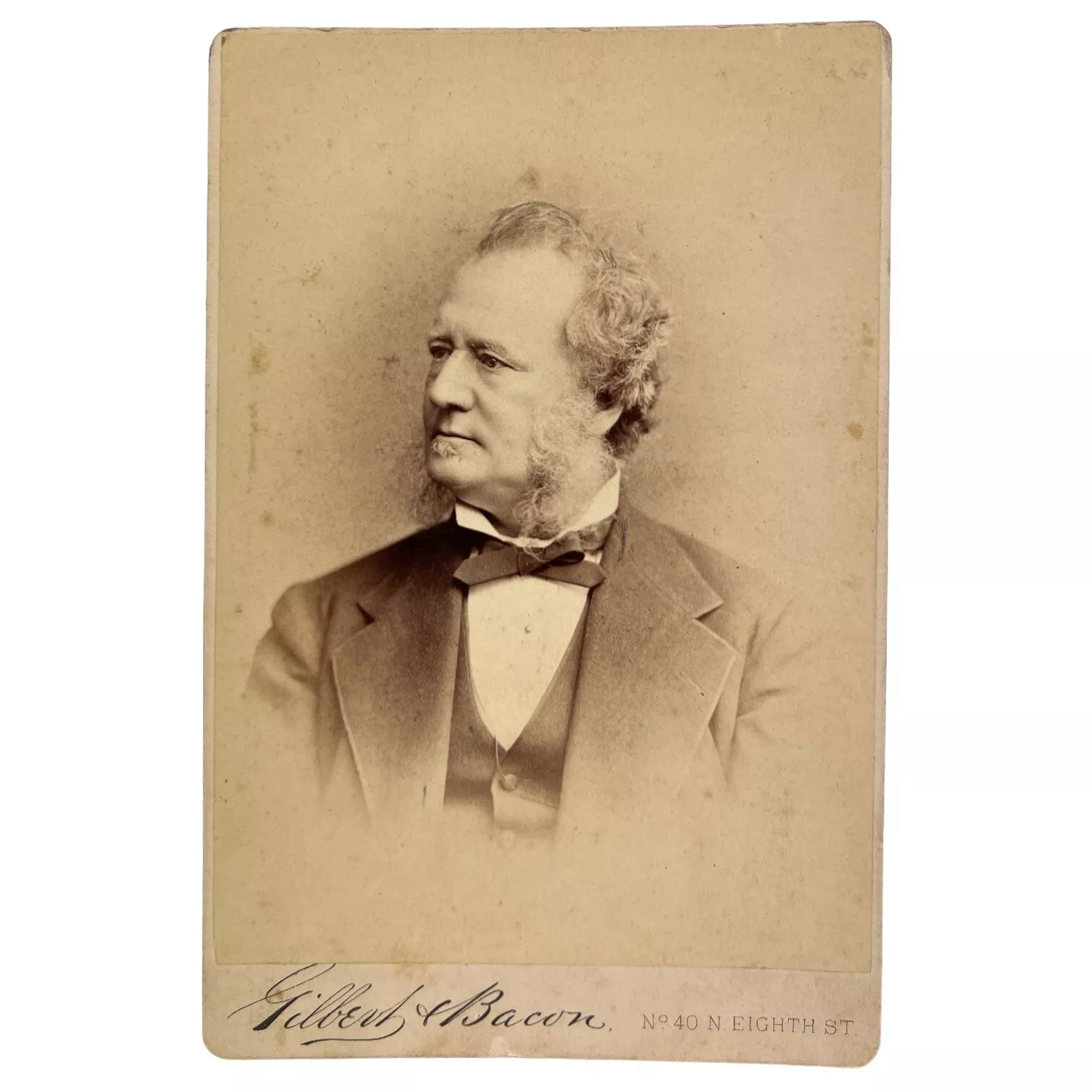
J. W. Torrey, Philadelphia, Nov 22, 1877 Photographed by Gilbert & Bacon, No 40 N. 8th St., Philadelphia.

Torrey returned to America in 1883. A few days before his death, the news from the King of Siam reached him, telling that he should be appointed as the king's chief adviser. Before he decided whether to take office or not, Torrey died suddenly on June 22, 1885, at his home on Wabon Street in Roxbury. Although he already died, he’s still recognized by the government for representing his lost kingdom as his body was dressed in the uniform of a high oriental dignitary for three days before his black walnut coffin was taken to the St. James Episcopal Church. A large crown of flowers in the colors of the flag of Ellenas, yellow and red, formed the central view, a half-moon with thirteen stripes on a blue background, and thirteen stars which testified to the American origins of the rajah. He was buried at the Torrey Family Cemetery of the Forest Hills Cemetery.

== Literature ==
- Joseph William Torrey: American Trading Company of Borneo Organized Under Special Concession from His Highness the Sultan of Borneo, and the General Laws of the State of New York. 1868
