= Malaysian order of precedence =

Relative preeminence of officials for ceremonial purposes

The Malaysian order of precedence is a hierarchy of important positions within the Government of Malaysia. It has no legal standing but is used by ceremonial protocol. The order of precedence is determined by the Federal Order of Precedence issued by the Prime Minister's Department. The latest one was issued on 13 November 2014. Unless otherwise noted, precedence among persons of equal rank is determined by seniority. As a general rule, spouses share the same rank with another and a person with two positions will take the highest one.

== Details ==
The following lists precedence of offices and their holders since 1 September 2026.

Colour legend
Heads and deputy heads of states
Members of the Federal and State Administrations
Members of the Federal and State Legislatures
Members of the Judiciary
Diplomats
Civil service, military and police members
Others

Rank	Position	Incumbent (as of 1 September 2026)
1	His Majesty The King	Sultan Ibrahim
2	Her Majesty The Queen	Raja Zarith Sofiah
3	Rulers and Regents of royal States	1. Sultan Mizan Zainal Abidin of Terengganu (15 May 1998); 2. Tuanku Syed Sirajuddin Jamalullail of Perlis (17 April 2000); 3. Sultan Sharafuddin Idris Shah of Selangor (22 November 2001); 4. Tuanku Muhriz of Negeri Sembilan (29 December 2008) (Note: The Undang Yang Empat did not recognize Tuanku Muhriz as the legitimate Yang di-Pertuan Besar of Negeri Sembilan since the 2026 Negeri Sembilan Constitutional Crisis, and installed Tunku Nadzaruddin Tuanku Ja'afar as the new Yang di-Pertuan Besar of Negeri Sembilan. However, the installation was not recognized by both Federal and State Governments and the Tunku Besar Seri Menanti. Tuanku Muhriz continues to have de jure rule over Negeri Sembilan.); 5. Sultan Ibrahim of Johor (23 January 2010) (appears above as the King); 6. Sultan Muhammad V of Kelantan (13 September 2010); 7. Sultan Nazrin Muizzuddin Shah of Perak (29 May 2014); 8. Sultan Sallehuddin of Kedah (12 September 2017); 9. Al-Sultan Abdullah Ri'ayatuddin al-Mustafa Billah Shah of Pahang (11 January 2019)
4	Governors of non-royal States	1. Yang di-Pertua Negeri of Melaka, Dr. Mohd. Ali Mohd. Rustam (4 June 2020); 2. Yang di-Pertua Negeri of Sarawak, Dr. Wan Junaidi Tuanku Jaafar (26 January 2024); 3. Yang di-Pertua Negeri of Sabah, Musa Aman (1 January 2025); 4. Yang di-Pertua Negeri of Penang, Ramli Ngah Talib (1 May 2025)
5	Former Raja Permaisuri Agong receiving Royal pension from the Federal Government (Note: Only the former Raja Permaisuri Agong whose husband died during his term of office as Yang di-Pertuan Agong deserves this position and receives Royal Pension from the Federal Government. Those whose husbands died after being the Yang di-Pertuan Agong do not deserve this position and will therefore receive Royal Pension from their respective State Government.)	Permaisuri Siti Aishah of Selangor
6	Prime Minister	Anwar Ibrahim MP
7	Deputy Prime Minister	1. Dr. Ahmad Zahid Hamidi MP; 2. Fadillah Yusof MP
7A	Heirs to the Thrones of royal States	1. Raja Muda of Perlis, Tuanku Syed Faizuddin Putra Jamalullail (1 August 2000) (appears after the Crown Prince and Regent of Johor); 2. Raja Muda of Selangor, Tengku Amir Shah (3 May 2002); 3. Yang di-Pertuan Muda of Terengganu, Tengku Muhammad Ismail (12 January 2006); 4. Tunku Mahkota of Johor, Tunku Ismail (28 January 2010) (appears right after the Sultan of Pahang as the Regent of Johor); 5. Raja Muda of Perak, Raja Jaafar (20 June 2014); 6. Raja Muda of Kedah, Tunku Sarafuddin Badlishah (26 November 2017); 7. Tengku Mahkota of Pahang, Tengku Hassanal Ibrahim Alam Shah (22 January 2019); 8. Tengku Mahkota of Kelantan, Tengku Muhammad Fakhry Petra (4 January 2024)
8	Members of the Most Exalted Order of the Crown of the Realm (DMN) (Note: Precedence is determined by date of investiture. Substantive members take precedence over honorary members.)	Refer here
9	Grand Commanders of the Order of the Defender of the Realm (SMN)	Refer here
10	Former Prime Ministers	By departure from office: 1. Mohd. Najib Abdul Razak (10 May 2018); 2. Dr. Mahathir Mohamad (29 February 2020) (appears above Najib as he received SMN on 31 October 2003); 3. Muhyiddin Yassin MP (16 August 2021); 4. Ismail Sabri Yaakob MP (24 November 2022)
11	Former Deputy Prime Ministers	By departure from office: 1. Musa Hitam (10 May 1986); 2. Dr. Wan Azizah Wan Ismail MP (24 February 2020) (appears above as Anwar's wife)
12	Grand Commanders of the Order of Loyalty to the Crown of Malaysia (SSM)	Refer here
12A	Ruling Chiefs of Negeri Sembilan	According to the State Constitution: Undang Luak of Sungai Ujong: Mubarak Dohak (disputed); Muhammad Faris Johari (De Jure); Undang Luak of Jelebu: Maarof Mohd. Rashad (disputed); Azrin Khairi (De Jure); Undang Luak of Johol, Muhammed Abdullah Undang Luak of Rembau: Abdul Rahim Yassin (disputed); Raja Haji Hasdan Abdul Hamid (De Jure); Tunku Besar of Tampin, Tunku Syed Razman
13	Chief Justice of the Federal Court	Justice Wan Ahmad Farid Wan Salleh
14	President of the Senate	Senator Awang Bemee Awang Ali Basah
15	Speaker of the House of Representatives	Johari Abdul
16	Ministers (Note: Precedence is determined by the Prime Minister's Department.)	Refer here
17	Chief Secretary to the Government	Shamsul Azri Abu Bakar
17A	Heads of State Governments (Note: In the presence of heads of states, their precedence is determined by heads of states' seniority. Otherwise, their precedence is determined as follows: the Premier of Sarawak, the Chief Minister of Sabah and other Menteris Besar and Chief Ministers according to the date of assumption of office.)	Refer here
18	President of the Court of Appeal	Justice Abu Bakar Jais
19	Chief Judge of Malaya	Justice Datuk Hashim Bin Hamzah
20	Chief Judge of Sabah and Sarawak	Justice Datuk Hajah Azizah Haji Nawawi
21	Attorney-General	Mohd Dusuki Mokhtar
22	Chief of Defence Forces	General Malek Razak Sulaiman
23	Inspector-General of Police	Mohd Khalid Ismail
24	Director-General of Public Service	Wan Ahmad Dahlan Abdul Aziz
25	Auditor General	Wan Suraya Wan Mohd Radzi
26	Chief Justice of the Syariah Court	Justice Mohd. Amran Mat Zain
27	Deputy President of the Senate	Senator Nur Jazlan Mohamed
28	Deputy Speaker of the House of Representatives	1. Ramli Mohd. Nor MP; 2. Alice Lau Kiong Yeng MP
29	Leader of the Opposition	Hamzah Zainudin MP
30	Deputy Ministers	Refer here
31	Heads of Diplomatic Missions (Note: Precedence is determined by diplomatic rank and assumption of office. Substantive heads of missions take precedence over acting heads of missions.)	Refer here
32	Justices of the Federal Court	Refer here
33	Judges of the Court of Appeal	Refer here
34	Parliamentary Secretaries	None
35	Commanders of the Order of the Defender of the Realm (PMN)	Refer here
36	Premier Grade 1 and 2 officers (Note: Equivalent military and police officers as well as equivalent chairpersons, chief executives and general managers of federal statutory bodies are included. Precedence is determined by date of appointment. Substantive officers takes precedence over acting officers. Permanent officers takes precedence over contractual and temporary officers.)	Refer here
37	Chairman of Government Official Ceremonies (Note: By tradition, Chairman of Government Official Ceremonies is the Senior Deputy Secretary-General of the Prime Minister's Department.)	Abdul Shukoor Mahmood
38	Secretaries-General of Federal Ministries and Directors-General of Federal Agencies (Note: Directors-General of Federal Agencies refer to those of Economic Planning Unit (of Ministry of Economic Affairs), Malaysian Administrative Modernisation and Management Planning Unit (of Ministry of Communication and Multimedia) and Implementation Coordination Unit (of Prime Minister's Department).)	Refer here
39	Premier Grade 3 officers	Refer here
40	Chairpersons of Commissions established under the Federal Constitution (Note: Commissions established under the Federal Constitution are Election Commission, Judicial and Legal Service Commission, Public Services Commission, Police Force Commission and Education Service Commission. Armed Forces Council, although being a council under law, is considered a service commission according to the Federal Constitution and is, therefore, included.)	Chairman of the Election Commission of Malaysia, Ramlan Harun; Chairman of Public Services Commission, Dr. Ahmad Jailani Muhamed Yunus (Note: Chairman of Judicial and Legal Service Commission is that of Public Services Commission.); Chairman of Armed Forces Council, Mohamad Hasan MP (Note: Chairman of Armed Forces Council is the Minister of Defence.) (appears above as Minister of Defence); Chairman of Police Service Commission, Senator Saifuddin Nasution Ismail MP (Note: Chairman of Police Force Commission is the Minister of Home Affairs.) (appears above as Minister of Home Affairs); Chairman of Education Service Commission, Dato' Haji Adzman Talib
41	Justices of the High Courts and Judicial Commissioners	Refer here for Justices of the High Courts or here for Judicial Commissioners
42	Commanders of the Order of Loyalty to the Crown of Malaysia (PSM)	Refer here
43	Governor of the Central Bank	Shaik Abdul Rasheed Abdul Ghaffour
44	Keeper of the Rulers' Seal	Syed Danial Syed Ahmad
45	Grand Chamberlain	Azuan Effendy Zairakithnaini
46	Royal Professor	None
46A	Deputy Heads of State Governments	By seniority of Heads of State Governments: 1. Douglas Uggah Embas MLA (Sarawak); 2. Awang Tengah Ali Hasan MLA (Sarawak); 3. Dr. Sim Kui Hian MLA (Sarawak); 4. Dr. Jeffrey Gapari Kitingan MP MLA (Sabah); 5. Dr. Joachim Gunsalam MLA (Sabah); 6. Shahelmey Yahya MP MLA (Sabah); 7. Dr. Mohamad Abdul Hamid MLA (Penang); 8. Jagdeep Singh Deo MLA (Penang); 9. Dr. Mohamed Fadzli Hassan MLA (Kelantan)
46B	Speakers of the State Legislative Assemblies	By seniority of Heads of State Governments: 1. Mohamad Asfia Awang Nassar (Sarawak); 2. Kadzim M. Yahya (Sabah); 3. Mohd. Nor Hamzah (Terengganu); 4. Awaludin Said (Negeri Sembilan); 5. Law Choo Kiang (Penang); 6. Mohd. Sharkar Shamsudin (Pahang); 7. Law Weng San MLA (Selangor); 8. Zubir Ahmad (Kedah); 9. Mohammad Zahir Abdul Khalid (Perak); 10. Zahari Sarip MLA (Johor); 11. Rus'sele Eizan (Perlis); 12. Ibrahim Durum (Melaka); 13. Nik Mohd. Amar Nik Abdullah MLA (Kelantan)
47	Senators (Note: Precedence is determined by the Yang di-Pertuan Agong.)	Refer to the Parliament
48	Members of the House of Representatives	Refer to the Parliament
49	Judges of the Syariah Court of Appeal	Refer to the Federal Syariah Judiciary Department (for national level) or the respective State Syariah Judiciary Department (for state level)
50	Chief of Army	General Azhan Md Othman
51	Chief of Navy	Admiral Zulhelmy Ithnain
52	Chief of Air Force	General Mohd Asghar Khan Goriman Khan
53	Deputy Inspector-General of Police	Datuk Seri Abdul Aziz Abdul Majid
54	Commanders of the Order of Meritorious Service (PJN)	Refer here
55	Commanders of the Order of Loyalty to the Royal Family of Malaysia (PSD)	Refer here
56	Super Grade A officers	Refer here
57	Vice Chancellors of Public Universities	Refer here
57A	Ministers of State (of Sabah and Sarawak) and Members of the State Executive Councils (of other states)	Refer to the respective State Government
58	Super Grade B officers	Refer here
58A	Recipient of National Fellowship Award (Note: National Fellowship Awards ceased to exist.)	None
59	United Nations Resident Representative	Karima El Korri
60	Super Grade C officers	Refer here
60A	Members of State Legislative Assemblies (Note: In Sabah and Sarawak, Assistant Ministers of State take precedence over all other members of the State Legislative Assembly whose precedence is determined by the respective State Government. In other states, precedence is determined by the State Government.)	Refer to the respective State Government
61	Companions of the Order of the Defender of the Realm (JMN)	Refer here
62	Companions of the Order of Loyalty to the Crown of Malaysia (JSM)	Refer here
63	Companions of the Order of Loyalty to the Royal Family of Malaysia (JSD)	Refer here
64	Grade 54 (SSM) or Grade 14 (SSPA) officers	
65	Political Secretaries (Note: Precedence is determined by Ministers' seniority.)	Refer here
66	Grade 52 (SSM) or Grade 13 (SSPA) officers	
67	Consul-general of countries without diplomatic representation in Malaysia	Refer here

== See also ==
- Orders, decorations, and medals of Malaysia
- List of post-nominal letters#Malaysia
