= 2016 Malaysian federal budget =

2016 Budget of the Malaysian Federal Government
Supply 2016
- Presented: 23 October 2015
- Country: Malaysia
- Parliament: 13th
- Party: Barisan Nasional
- Finance minister: Najib Razak
- Treasurer: Ministry of Finance
- Total revenue: MYR225.7 billion
- Total expenditures: MYR267.2 billion
- Program spending: MYR52 billion
- Debt payment: MYR26.6 billion
- Deficit: MYR38.8 billion (3.1% of GDP)
- Debt: MYR627.5 billion (54% of GDP)
- GDP: MYR1,114.8 billion (4.0%-5.0%)
- Website: www.najibrazak.com/bajet2016/

The Malaysian federal budget for 2016 fiscal year was presented to the Dewan Rakyat by Prime Minister and Minister of Finance, Najib Razak on Friday, 23 October 2015.

== Summary ==
Official sources (Malay version)

Official sources (English version)

== Total revenues and spending ==
=== Revenues ===
Revenue estimates for 2016 Budget, excluding 2016 tax measures
1. Companies income tax (33.0%)
2. Goods and services tax (17.3%)
3. Individual income tax (13.4%)
4. Interests and proceeds from investments (9.50%)
5. Licenses, registration fees and permits (6.00%)
6. Excise duties (5.50%)
7. Petroleum income tax (4.10%)
8. Stamp duty (3.00%)

Official sources

(In million MYR)

Source	Projected Revenues	% of Total Projected Revenues	Actual Revenues
Direct tax Income tax Companies Individual Petroleum Withholding Co-operatives Others Other direct taxes Stamp duty Real property gains tax Others	125,566 116,558 74,381 30,266 9,331 2,473 84 23 9,008 6,766 2,163 79	55.6% 51.6% 33.0% 13.4% 4.1% 1.1% 0.0% 0.0% 4.0% 3.0% 1.0% 0.0%	
Indirect tax Goods and services tax Local goods and services Imported goods and services Excise duties CKD and CBU vehicles Others Import duties Others CKD and CBU vehicles Spirits and malt liquor Tobacco, cigarattes and cigar Other indirect taxes Export duties Crude petroleum Processed palm oil Crude palm oil Others	57,987 39,000 21,729 17,271 12,408 7,259 5,149 2,791 2,234 424 94 39 2,776 1,012 900 52 43 17	25.7% 17.3% 9.6% 7.7% 5.5% 3.2% 2.3% 1.2% 1.0% 0.2% 0.0% 0.0% 1.2% 0.4% 0.4% 0.0% 0.0% 0.0%	
Non-tax revenue Interests and proceeds from investments Licenses, registration fees and permits Other non-tax revenue Service fees Fines and penalties Proceeds from sales of goods Rentals	39,648 21,452 12,626 2,506 1,510 1,223 211 120	17.6% 9.5% 6.0% 1.1% 0.7% 0.5% 0.1% 0.1%	
Non-revenue receipts	1,504	0.7%	
Revenue from Federal Territories	951	0.4%	
Grand Total Revenue	225,656		

=== Expenditures by object ===
Official sources

These tables are in million MYR.

Description	Projected Expenditures	Actual Expenditures
Operating expenditures
Emoluments	70,466.1	
Supplies and services	36,315.1	
Assets	761.0	
Fixed Charges and Grants	106,648.2	
Other Expenditures	1,033.5	
Total Operating Expenditure	215,224.0	
Development expenditures
Direct Grant	47,178.1	
Loans	2,821.9	
Contingencies Reserve	2,000.0	
Total Development Expenditure	52,000.0	
Grand Total Expenditure	267,224.0	

=== Expenditures by budget function ===
Official sources

These tables are in million MYR. The budget for the 2016 fiscal year (also demonstrating the basic budget structure) can be found below.

Function	Description	Projected			Actual
Function	Description	Expenditures	Operating Expenditures	Development Expenditures	Expenditures
1	Parliament	131.1	131.1	—N/a	
2	Office of the Keeper of the Rulers' Seal	2.1	2.1	—N/a	
3	National Audit Department	163.8	163.8	—N/a	
4	Election Commission	150.6	150.6	—N/a	
5	Public Services Commission	47.4	47.4	—N/a	
6	Prime Minister's Department	20,309.9	5,984.2	14,325.7	
7	Public Service Department	2,515.4	2,436.6	78.9	
8	Attorney General Chambers	185.4	185.4	—N/a	
9	Malaysian Anti-Corruption Commission	251.8	251.8	—N/a	
10	Treasury	4,477.2	3,626.0	851.3	
11	Treasury General Services	25,885.9	25,885.9	—N/a	
12	Contribution to Statutory Funds	1,883.8	1,883.8	—N/a	
13	Ministry of Foreign Affairs	710.5	595.1	115.4	
20	Ministry of Plantation Industries and Commodities	650.4	234.8	415.5	
21	Ministry of Agriculture and Agro-based Industry	5,353.8	3,487.9	1,865.9	
22	Ministry of Rural and Regional Development	10,831.2	5,379.9	5,451.3	
23	Ministry of Natural Resources and Environment	2,670.9	1,008.1	1,662.8	
24	Ministry of International Trade and Industry	1,914.4	539.3	1,375.2	
25	Ministry of Domestic Trade, Co-operatives and Consumerism	797.4	730.1	67.3	
27	Ministry of Works	5,775.9	2,223.3	3,552.6	
28	Ministry of Transport	3,954.7	1,194.1	2,760.6	
29	Ministry of Energy, Green Technology and Water	2,262.0	125.3	2,136.6	
30	Ministry of Science, Technology and Innovation	1,527.0	661.1	865.8	
31	Ministry of Tourism and Culture	1,221.0	973.2	247.8	
32	Ministry of the Federal Territories	1,316.3	358.3	958.0	
40	Education Service Commission	16.8	16.8	—N/a	
42	Ministry of Health	23,031.1	21,430.8	1,600.3	
43	Ministry of Urban Wellbeing, Housing and Local Government	4,173.1	2,477.1	1,696.0	
45	Ministry of Youth and Sports	931.8	473.9	458.0	
46	Ministry of Human Resources	1,376.8	836.1	540.7	
47	Ministry of Communications and Multimedia	1,806.1	1,288.4	517.7	
48	Ministry of Women, Family and Community Development	1,986.9	1,873.3	113.6	
60	Ministry of Defence	17,304.4	13,457.3	3,847.1	
62	Ministry of Home Affairs	13,092.7	12,251.8	840.9	
63	Ministry of Education	41,359.7	39,315.9	2,043.8	
64	Ministry of Higher Education	13,378.3	11,767.1	1,611.2	
70	Contingency fund	2,000.0	—N/a	2,000.0	
Total Functional Expenditure		215,448.0	163,448.0	52,000.0	
Dependent	Description	Projected			Actual
Dependent	Description	Expenditures	Operating Expenditures	Development Expenditures	Expenditures
(1)	Royal spending for the Yang di-Pertuan Agong	13.5	13.5	—N/a	
(2)	Royal allowances	1.5	1.5	—N/a	
(3)	Chief Justice, Chief Judges, Judges	90	90	—N/a	
(4)	Auditor General	0.7	0.7	—N/a	
(5)	Speaker of the Dewan Rakyat	1.6	1.6	—N/a	
(6)	President of the Dewan Negara	1.8	1.8	—N/a	
(7)	Election Commission	2.3	2.3	—N/a	
(8)	Law Services Commission	0.05	0.05	—N/a	
(9)	Public Services Commission	10.7	10.7	—N/a	
(10)	Education Services Commission	5	5	—N/a	
(11)	Police Force Commission	1.7	1.7	—N/a	
(12)	Treasury	6,072.1	6,072.1	—N/a	
(13)	Payment for public debt	26,639.4	26,639.4	—N/a	
(14)	Pensions, retirement allowances and rewards	18,954.0	18,954.0	—N/a	
Total Dependent Expenditure		51,776.2	51,776.2	—N/a	
Grand Total Expenditure		267,224.0			

== Reactions ==
- Maria Chin Abdullah - The Bersih chairperson urged all opposition MPs to vote down the government's 2016 budget to oust Prime Minister Najib Razak.
- Pandikar Amin Mulia - The Speaker of the Dewan Rakyat said the opposition should submit a list of MPs willing to support a motion of no confidence against the Prime Minister to establish if the move had enough traction for a debate. Pandikar also said the list would give him leverage to pressure Putrajaya to agree to having the motion tabled and debated, especially if the numbers go beyond the 89 seats occupied by the opposition.
- Shahrir Abdul Samad - The Barisan Nasional Backbenchers Club (BNBBC) chairman said if the budget, to be tabled by Najib, failed to be passed in the Dewan Rakyat, the prime minister would automatically have to relinquish his post. "If the budget is not passed, there is no government, no finances. How will the government carry out its administration without paying salaries and allocations?", Shahrir said.

== See also ==
- 2016 Pakatan Harapan alternative federal budget
