= Abdul Rahman Arshad =

Malaysian academic, educator, and diplomat (1936–2020)

Yang Berbahagia Tan Sri Datuk Seri Panglima Dr. Abdul Rahman Arshad PSM SPDK SPMS DCSM DMPN DSAP JMN JSM BSK
- Born: 27 November 1936; Kampung Air Limau, Masjid Tanah, Malacca, Straits Settlements (now Malaysia)
- Died: 16 August 2020 (aged 83); Taman Ampang Utama, Ampang, Selangor, Malaysia
- Occupations: Academician, educator, diplomat
- Spouse: Noor Hayati Mohamed
- Children: 3

Abdul Rahman bin Arshad (27 November 1936 – 16 August 2020) was a Malaysian academic, educator and diplomat. He served as the Pro-Chancellor of the Universiti Teknologi MARA (UiTM) and has been widely known as the national education icon.

== Early life ==
Abdul Rahman was born in Kampung Air Limau, Masjid Tanah, Malacca and received his early education in his home state and later pursued his studies at the University of Malaya (UM). He then went on to study at the University of Singapore, the University of Reading, the New Zealand College of Administrative Staff, Harvard Business School and completed his PhD at the University of East London.

== Career ==
Arshad's academic career began as a teacher at the Malay College Kuala Kangsar, and then he was appointed the Deputy Director of Education in Penang, Kedah and Kelantan. He went on to hold his last position as Director General of Education before officially retiring in 1991. After his retirement, he was appointed to multiple positions including Education Consultant at Bank Negara Malaysia. He has also served as a diplomat in Morocco, the Philippines and Thailand. He was appointed the Pro-Chancellor of UiTM on 15 December 2002 along with other five fellows.

From 2014 to 2016, he was appointed by Muhyiddin Yassin when the latter held the position of Deputy Prime Minister to be the Chairman of the National Education Advisory Council (MPPK).

== Death ==
Arshad died on 16 August 2020 at the age of 83 at his residence in Taman Ampang Utama, Ampang District, Selangor due to old age, exactly three months prior to what would have been his 84th birthday. His remains were laid to rest in his hometown in Masjid Tanah, Malacca. He is survived by his widow, Puan Sri Noor Hayati Mohamed and three children.

== Honours ==
- Malaysia
  - Companion of the Order of Loyalty to the Crown of Malaysia (JSM) (1973)
  - Companion of the Order of the Defender of the Realm (JMN) (1981)
  - Commander of the Order of Loyalty to the Crown of Malaysia (PSM) – Tan Sri (1988)
- Malacca
  - Knight Commander of the Exalted Order of Malacca (DCSM) – Datuk Wira (1986)
- Pahang
  - Knight Companion of the Order of Sultan Ahmad Shah of Pahang (DSAP) – Dato' (1986)
- Sabah
  - Grand Commander of the Order of Kinabalu (SPDK) – Datuk Seri Panglima (1990)
- Penang
  - Companion of the Order of the Defender of State (DMPN) – Dato' (1992)
- Selangor
  - Knight Grand Commander of the Order of the Crown of Selangor (SPMS) – Dato' Seri (2010)
