= List of English College Johore Bahru alumni =

This is the list of English College Johore Bahru alumni.

== Politics ==
- Tun Musa Hitam - 5th Deputy Prime Minister of Malaysia
- Tun Dr Ismail Abdul Rahman - 2nd Deputy Prime Minister of Malaysia
- Dato' Syed Esa bin Alwee - the second Speaker of the Dewan Rakyat
- Datuk Mohamed Rahmat - Former Pulai Parliament of United Malays National Organisation
- Lee San Choon - 4th President of Malaysian Chinese Association
- Lim Kit Siang - 2nd President of Democratic Action Party
- Syed Husin Ali - Former Senator, former President of Parti Sosialis Rakyat Malaysia and Deputy President of People's Justice Party
- Ungku Abdul Aziz Abdul Majid - 6th Menteri Besar of Johor
- Dato' Wan Idris Ibrahim - 9th Menteri Besar of Johor
- Datuk Seri Mohamed Khaled Nordin - 15th Menteri Besar of Johor
- Tan Sri Samsudin Osman - Former Chief Secretary of Malaysia
- J. B. Jeyaretnam - 3rd President of Workers' Party of Singapore
- Tengku Haron Aminurrashid - Kempas State Assembly of United Malays National Organisation
- Syed Hussein Alatas - Founding Members of Parti Gerakan Rakyat Malaysia and Vice Chancellor of University Malaya
- Chua Jui Meng - The former and longest-serving Minister of Health Malaysia
- Tun Awang Hassan - 5th Yang di-Pertua Negeri of Penang
- Dato Razali Ibrahim - Muar Parliament of United Malay National Organisation
- Dato Seri Ali Haji Ahmad - Former Minister of Agriculture of Malaysia
- Sheikh Ahmad Nafiq AlFirdaous - Former Councillor of Johor Bahru City Council
- Syed Saddiq Abdul Rahman - Former Minister of Youth and Sports
- YB Dr Maszlee Malik - Former Minister of Education Malaysia

== Royalty ==
- Iskandar of Johor - 24th Sultan of Johor, the eighth Yang di-Pertuan Agong of Malaysia
- Ibrahim Iskandar of Johor - 25th Sultan of Johor, the seventeenth Yang di-Pertuan Agong of Malaysia
- Tunku Abdul Majid - Tunku Bendahara of Johor
- Tunku Maimunah Ismailiah
- Tunku Masera
- Tunku Mariam

== Arts ==
- Ahmad Zakii Anwar - A well-known artist in Malaysia
- Datuk Sheikh Abdullah Ahmad - A World Famous Singer
- Rozman Shafie (LY) - Composer with Two Times TV3 Anugerah Juara Lagu Winner
- Mohd Faizal bin Maas (Ajai) - Malaysian Composer and Three Times Winner of National Music Industry Awards
- Rahmad bin Tohak (Rahmat Mega) - Malaysian Rockstar Singer
- Shah Nizam Abdul Halim (Shah Slam) -Malaysian top guitarist
- Musa bin Radhi (Musrad) - Lyric and composer
- AG Kool FM - TV and Radio celebrity
- Fahrin Ahmad - Malaysian actor and TV host

== Sports ==
- Rezal Zambery Yahya - ATM FA player
- Haji Abdullah bin Mohd Don, Harimau Malaya - Football Association of Johor player
- Nafeez Wahab - FIFA Referee
- Jasazrin Jamaluddin - Johor Darul Takzim FC midfield player
- Shukri Abd Kadir - National hurdles coach
- Dr Freddie Lai Kwok - President of the Johor Rugby Union
- Hassan Yaakob - National Ruggers
- Abu Bakar Yunos - National Ruggers
- Ahmad Isa - National Ruggers
- Wan Abdul Rahman - National Ruggers
- Ungku Ibrahim - National Ruggers
- Ungku Ismail Abdullah - National Ruggers
- Ng Yew Liang - National Ruggers
- Ng Yew Meng - National Ruggers
- Dr Tay Chong Yew - National Cricket Player and Johore Ruggers
- Hassan Yaakob - National Ruggers
- Kenny Pestana - Johore Ruggers
- Brian Pestana - Johore Ruggers
- Abdullah Ali - Johore Ruggers
- Daniel Nathaniel - Johore Ruggers
- Jagjit Singh - Johore Ruggers
- Zubir Ali - Johore Ruggers
- Abdul Majid Tahir - Johore Ruggers
- N. Selvarajah - Johore Ruggers
- Tom Alkhafidz - National Ruggers

== Education ==
- Professor Diraja Ungku Abdul Aziz Ungku Abdul Hamid - First Regius Professor in Malaysia
- Hj. Samsudin Bin Md Ariff - 43rd headmaster of English College Johore Bahru
- Tan Sri Kuek Ho Yao - A renowned figure in Johor's development and a founder of Southern University College, brother of Robert Kuok
- Tun Zaki Azmi - 6th Chief Justice of Malaysia and Chancellor Multimedia University
- YH Professor Dato' Dr Daing Mohd Nasir Ibrahim - Vice Chancellor of Universiti Malaysia Pahang
- Adibah Amin - 1st Headmistress of Sekolah Seri Puteri
- Syed Muhammad Naquib al-Attas - prominent contemporary Muslim philosopher and thinker
- Dr Keong Choong - PhD from Imperial College London, academician, finance & investment consultant
- Prof. Dato' Dr. Ho Sinn Chye - PhD from Max Planck Institute and Kiel University Germany, Vice-Chancellor of Wawasan Open University

== Military ==
- General Tun Ibrahim Ismail - 3rd commander of the Malaysian Armed Forces
- General Tun Ghazali Mohd Seth - 4th commander of the Malaysian Armed Forces
- First Admiral Dato' Ir Hj Ahmad Murad Hj Omar - Royal Malaysian Navy

== Business ==
- Robert Kuok - 40th richest man in the world
- Tan Sri Jamaluddin Ibrahim - CEO and president of Axiata Group
- Tan Sri Muhammad Ali Hashim - President of DPIM and former CEO of Johor Corporation
- Dato Abdul Wahid Omar - Former Chairman of Pemodalan Nasional Berhad
- Dato'Hj Mohd Razip Hj Mohammad - Executive Director of TH Heavy Industries Sdn Bhd

== Others ==
- Tan Sri Taib Andak, chairman of Majlis Amanah Rakyat and Federal Land Development Authority
- Tun Zaki bin Tun Azmi - The sixth Chief Justice of Malaysia
- Justice Gan Techiong - Judge of the High Court of Malaya, serving at the High Court at Kuala Lumpur
- Tan Sri Dato' Hj.Ahmad Perang - 1st Malay General Manager of Malayan Railway (KTM)
- Micheal Graham Parry - 15th Grand Master of Freemason Johor Royal Lodge
- Dr.Zubaidi Hj.Ahmad - Malaysian Bloggers Doctor
- M. G. G. Pillai - A Malaysian journalist and political activist
- Datin Paduka Dr. Hajah Sharifah Mazlina - the first Asian woman to travel to the North Pole
- Mohamed Hamzah - creator of Malaysian flag
- Dr. Teo Kah Wee - Pediatrician/Influencer
