= Order of precedence in Sabah =

Relative preeminence of officials for ceremonial purposes

The Sabah order of precedence is a hierarchy of important positions within the state of Sabah, Malaysia. It has no legal standing but is used by ceremonial protocol. The order of precedence is determined by the State Order of Precedence issued by the Sabah Chief Minister's Department. The latest one was issued on 1 September 1996 with amendments entered into force on 3 October 2003. Unless otherwise noted, precedence among persons of equal rank is determined by seniority. As a general rule, spouses share the same rank with another and a person with two positions will take the highest one.

== Details ==
The following lists precedence of offices and their holders as of 22 October 2023.

Colour legend
Heads and deputy heads of states
Members of the Federal and State Administrations
Members of the Federal and State Legislatures
Members of the Judiciary
Diplomats
Civil service, military and police members
Others

=== State-level ceremonies ===
Rank	Position	Incumbent (as of 22 October 2023)
1	Governor	Juhar Mahiruddin
2	Chief Minister	Hajiji Noor MLA, Minister of Finance
3	Former Governors	By departure from office: Ahmadshah Abdullah (31 December 2010)
4	Grand Commanders of the Most Distinguished Order of the Defender of the Realm (SMN) (Note: Precedence is determined by date of investiture. Substantive recipients take precedence over honorary recipients.)	See above (Note: Recipients of this Order have been always former Governors.)
5	Grand Commanders of the Distinguished Order of Loyalty to the Crown of Malaysia (SSM)	None from Sabah
6	Former acting Governors and widows of former Governors	1. Rahimah Stephens, widow of Mohammad Fuad Stephens; 2. Siti Rukaiyah Abdullah, widow of Sakaran Dandai
7	Speaker of the Legislative Assembly	Kadzim M. Yahya
8	Deputy Chief Ministers	1. Dr. Jeffrey Gapari Kitingan MP MLA, Minister of Agriculture, Fisheries and Food Industry; 2. Dr. Joachim Gunsalam MLA, Minister of Local Government and Housing; 3. Shahelmey Yahya MP MLA, Minister of Works
9	Federal Ministers	From Sabah: 1. Ewon Benedick MP MLA, Minister of Entrepreneurship Development and Co-operatives; 2. Armizan Mohd. Ali MP, Minister in the Prime Minister's Department (Sabah-Sarawak Affairs and Special Duties)
10	Ministers of State	Cabinet ministers: 1. Masidi Manjun MLA, Minister of Finance; 2. Jahid Jahim MLA, Minister of Rural Development; 3. Christina Liew Chin Jin MLA, Minister of Tourism, Culture and Environment; 4. Phoong Jin Zhe MLA, Minister of Industrial Development and Entrepreneurship; 5. Dr. Mohd. Arifin Mohd. Arif MLA, Minister of Science, Technology and Innovation; 6. James Ratib MLA, Minister of Community Development and People's Wellbeing; 7. Ellron Alfred Angin MLA, Minister of Youth and Sports; Ministers outside Cabinet (placed below after the State Secretary): 1. Rubin Balang MLA, Chairman of Sabah State Economic Development Corporation; 2. Masiung Banah MLA, Chairman of Housing and Town Development Authority of Sabah; 3. Dr. Yusof Yacob MLA, Chairman of Qhazanah Sabah Berhad; 4. Pandikar Amin Mulia, Sabah BIMP-EAGA Special Envoy; 5. Frankie Poon Ming Fung MLA, Chairman of Sabah Development Berhad; 6. Ghulam Haidar Khan Bahadar MLA, Director of Sabah Foundation; 7. Senator Anifah Aman, Chairman of Labuan Corporation
11	Former Chief Ministers	By departure from office: 1. Mohd. Harris Salleh (22 April 1985); 2. Joseph Pairin Kitingan (17 March 1994); 3. Mohd. Salleh Mohd. Said MLA (28 May 1996); 4. Yong Teck Lee MLA (28 May 1998); 5. Bernard Giluk Dompok (14 March 1999); 6. Osu Sukam (27 March 2001); 7. Chong Kah Kiat (27 March 2003); 8. Musa Aman (12 May 2018); 9. Mohd. Shafie Apdal MLA (28 September 2020)
12	Chief Judge of Sabah and Sarawak	Justice Abdul Rahman Sebli
13	State Secretary	Sr. Safar Untong
14	Federal Secretary to the State	Makhzan Mahyuddin
15	Army Eastern Field Commander	Major General Razak Malek Sulaiman
16	Navy Eastern Fleet Commander	Vice Admiral Muhammad Ruzelme Ahmad Fahimy
17	State Police Commissioner	Jauteh Dikun
18	Deputy Speakers of the Legislative Assembly	Richard Yong We Kong; Al Hambra Juhar
19	Assistant Ministers of State (Note: Precedence is determined by seniority of Ministers.)	See here
20	Judges of the High Court (Note: Judicial Commissioners are included.)	Refer to the Registry General of the Federal Court
21	Commanders of the Most Distinguished Order of the Defender of the Realm (PMN)	Refer to the State Protocol and Ceremonial Division
22	Commanders of the Distinguished Order of Loyalty to the Crown of Malaysia (PSM)	Refer to the State Protocol and Ceremonial Division
23	Grand Commanders of the Order of Kinabalu (SPDK)	Refer to the State Protocol and Ceremonial Division
24	Senators and Members of the House of Representatives (Note: Precedence is determined by the Yang di-Pertuan Agong.)	Refer to the State Protocol and Ceremonial Division
25	Members of the Legislative Assembly (Note: Precedence is determined by Speaker of the Legislative Assembly.)	Refer to the State Protocol and Ceremonial Division
26	Commanders of the Order of Kinabalu (PGDK)	Refer to the State Protocol and Ceremonial Division
27	Consul-General of Indonesia in Kota Kinabalu	Rafail Walangitan
28	Chairpersons of Commission established under the State Constitution (Note: The only commission established under the State Constitution has been the State Public Service Commission.)	Sukarti Wakiman, Chairman of State Public Service Commission
29	State Attorney-General	Nor Asiah Mohd. Yusof
30	Permanent Secretary, State Ministry of Finance	Mohd. Sofian Alfian Nair
31	Deputy State Secretaries	Diyanah Abdullah (Administration); Dr. Ahemad Sade (Development); Sapdin Ibrahim (Special Duties)
32	Chairpersons of State Statutory Bodies	Refer to the State Protocol and Ceremonial Division
33	State Mufti	Bungsu Aziz Jaafar
34	Accredited Consuls, Honorary Consuls and Honorary Representatives of foreign states	Refer to the State Protocol and Ceremonial Division
35	Permanent Secretaries of State Ministries (Note: Precedence is determined by the date of appointment. Substantive officers take precedence over acting officers. Permanent officers take precedence over contractual and temporary officers.)	Refer to the State Protocol and Ceremonial Division
36	Presidents of Municipal Councils	By date of incorporation: Noorliza Awang Alip, Mayoress of Kota Kinabalu City; Henry Idol, President of Sandakan Municipal Council; Joseph Pang Pick Lim, President of Tawau Municipal Council
37	Grade 52 officers (Note: Military and police officers are included.)	Refer to the State Protocol and Ceremonial Division
38	State Political Secretaries	Refer to the State Protocol and Ceremonial Division
39	Bishops and religious leaders	Refer to the State Protocol and Ceremonial Division
40	Justices of Peace	Refer to the State Protocol and Ceremonial Division
41	Companions of the Order of Kinabalu (ASDK)	Refer to the State Protocol and Ceremonial Division
42	Members of Commission established under the State Constitution	1. Claudius Roman, Deputy Chairman; 2. Idrus Shafie; 3. Mariam Omar; 4. Janet Chee Ken Liam; 5. Halima Nawab Khan; 6. Awang Shamsi Jamih; 7. Ariffin Gadait; 8. Iman Ali
43	Grade 41 to 51 officers	Refer to the State Protocol and Ceremonial Division
44	Members of the Order of Kinabalu (ADK)	Refer to the State Protocol and Ceremonial Division
45	Members of the First Class of the Medal of Kinabalu (BSK)	Refer to the State Protocol and Ceremonial Division
46	Members of the Second Class of the Medal of Kinabalu (BK)	Refer to the State Protocol and Ceremonial Division

=== Federal-level ceremonies ===
Rank	Position	Incumbent (as of 22 October 2023)
1	Yang di-Pertuan Agong	See Malaysian order of precedence
2	Raja Permaisuri Agong	See Malaysian order of precedence
3	Governor	See the above list
4	Rulers of royal States	See Malaysian order of precedence
5	Governors of non-royal States	See Malaysian order of precedence
6	Prime Minister	See Malaysian order of precedence
6A	Heirs to the Thrones of royal States	See Malaysian order of precedence
7	Deputy Prime Minister	See Malaysian order of precedence
8	Chief Minister	See the above list
8A	Head of other State Governments	See Malaysian order of precedence
9	Former Governors	See the above list
10	Grand Commanders of the Most Distinguished Order of the Defender of the Realm (SMN)	Refer here
11	Grand Commanders of the Distinguished Order of Loyalty to the Crown of Malaysia (SSM)	Refer here
12	Former acting Governors and widows of former Governors	See the above list
13	Chief Justice	See Malaysian order of precedence
14	President of the Senate	See Malaysian order of precedence
15	Speaker of the House of Representatives	See Malaysian order of precedence
16	Speaker of the Legislative Assembly	See the above list
16A	Speaker of other Legislative Assemblies	See Malaysian order of precedence
17	Deputy Chief Ministers	See the above list
18	Federal Ministers	See Malaysian order of precedence
19	Ministers of State	See the above list
19A	Ministers of State (of Sarawak)	Refer to Sarawak State Government
19B	Members of other State Executive Councils	Refer to the respective State Government
20	High Commissioners, Ambassadors, Ministers Plenipotentiary and Charge d'Affaires	Refer here
21	Chief Judges	Justice Abdul Rahman Sebli, Chief Judge of Sabah and Sarawak; Justice Mohamad Zabidin Mohamad Diah, Chief Judge of Malaya; Justice Mohd. Amran Mat Zain, Chief Judge of Federal Syariah Court; Justice Samal Munji, Covering Chief Judge of State Syariah Court
22	Chief Secretary to the Government	See Malaysian order of precedence
23	State Secretary	See the above list
23A	Other State Secretaries	Refer here
23B	Justices of the Supreme Court	See Malaysian order of precedence
23C	Deputy President of the Senate and Deputy Speaker of the House of Representatives	See Malaysian order of precedence
24	Federal Deputy Ministers	See Malaysian order of precedence
25	Deputy Speakers of the Legislative Assembly	See the above list
26	Assistant Ministers of State	See here
26A	Deputy Ministers of State (of Sarawak)	Refer to Sarawak State Government
26B	Parliamentary Secretaries	None
27	Federal Attorney-General	See Malaysian order of precedence
28	Chief of Defence Force	See Malaysian order of precedence
29	Inspector General of Police	See Malaysian order of precedence
30	Secretary General, Federal Ministry of Finance	Refer to the Federal Ministry of Finance
31	Director-General of Public Service	Refer to the Prime Minister's Office
31A	Prime Ministers' Special Advisor	Refer to the Prime Minister's Office
31B	Premier Grade 2 and 3 officers	Refer here
32	Judges of the High Court	See the above list
32A	Governor of the Central Bank	See Malaysian order of precedence
32B	Keeper of the Rulers' Seal	See Malaysian order of precedence
32C	Grand Chamberlain	See Malaysian order of precedence
33	Commanders of the Most Distinguished Order of the Defender of the Realm (PMN)	Refer here
34	Commanders of the Distinguished Order of Loyalty to the Crown of Malaysia (PSM)	Refer here
34A	Former Chief Ministers	See the above list
35	Grand Commanders of the Order of Kinabalu (SPDK)	Refer to the State Protocol and Ceremonial Division
36	Senators	Refer to the State Protocol and Ceremonial Division
37	Members of the House of Representatives	Refer to the State Protocol and Ceremonial Division
38	Members of the Legislative Assembly	Refer to the State Protocol and Ceremonial Division
38A	Members of the other Legislative Assemblies	Refer to the respective State Government
39	Commanders of the Order of Kinabalu (PGDK)	Refer to the State Protocol and Ceremonial Division
39A	Royal Professor	None
39B	Commanders of the Most Distinguished Royal Family Order of Loyalty (PSD)	Refer here
39C	Recipients of state order bringing the title of Datuk or Dato'	Refer to the respective State Government
40	Consul-General of Indonesia in Sabah and Sarawak	See the above list
41	Chairpersons of Commission established under the State Constitution	See the above list
41A	Federal Secretary to the State	See the above list
42	State Attorney-General	See the above list
43	Permanent Secretary, State Ministry of Finance	See the above list
44	Deputy State Secretaries	See the above list
45	Chairpersons of State Statutory Bodies	Refer to the State Protocol and Ceremonial Division
46	Army Eastern Field and Navy Eastern Fleet Commanders	See the above list
47	State Police Commissioner	See the above list
48	State Mufti	See the above list
49	Accredited Consuls, Honorary Consuls and Honorary Representatives of foreign states	Refer to the State Protocol and Ceremonial Division
50	Super Grade A and B officers	Refer to the State Protocol and Ceremonial Division
51	Secretaries-General of Federal Ministries	Refer here
51A	United Nations Resident Representative	See Malaysian order of precedence
52	Presidents of Municipal Councils	See the above list
53	Grade 45 and above officers	Refer to the State Protocol and Ceremonial Division
54	State Political Secretaries	Refer to the State Protocol and Ceremonial Division
54A	Federal Political Secretaries	Refer to the State Protocol and Ceremonial Division
55	Bishops and religious leaders	Refer to the State Protocol and Ceremonial Division
56	Justices of Peace	Refer to the State Protocol and Ceremonial Division
57	Companions of the Order of Kinabalu (ASDK)	Refer to the State Protocol and Ceremonial Division
58	Members of Commission established under the State Constitution	See the above list
59	Grade 41 to 44 officers	Refer to the State Protocol and Ceremonial Division
60	Members of the Order of Kinabalu (ADK)	Refer to the State Protocol and Ceremonial Division
61	Members of the First Class of the Medal of Kinabalu (BSK)	Refer to the State Protocol and Ceremonial Division
62	Members of the Second Class of the Medal of Kinabalu (BK)	Refer to the State Protocol and Ceremonial Division

=== District-level ceremonies ===
Rank	Position	Incumbent
1	Governor	See the above list
2	Chief Minister	See the above list
3	Presidents of Municipal Councils	See the above list
3A	District Officers	Refer to the State Protocol and Ceremonial Division
3B	Chairpersons of Town Boards	Refer to the State Protocol and Ceremonial Division
3C	Chairpersons of District Councils	Refer to the State Protocol and Ceremonial Division
4	Grand Commanders of the Most Distinguished Order of the Defender of the Realm (SMN)	Refer here
5	Grand Commanders of the Distinguished Order of Loyalty to the Crown of Malaysia (SSM)	Refer here
6	Ministers of State	See the above list
7	Assistant Ministers of State	See the above list
7A	Judges of the High Court	See the above list
8	Commanders of the Most Distinguished Order of the Defender of the Realm (PMN)	Refer here
9	Commanders of the Distinguished Order of Loyalty to the Crown of Malaysia (PSM)	Refer here
10	Grand Commanders of the Order of Kinabalu (SPDK)	Refer to the State Protocol and Ceremonial Division
11	Commanders of the Order of Kinabalu (PGDK)	Refer to the State Protocol and Ceremonial Division
11A	Senators	Refer to the Parliament
11B	Members of the House of Representatives	Refer to the Parliament
12	Members of the Legislative Assembly	Refer to the State Protocol and Ceremonial Division
12A	Accredited Consuls of foreign states	Refer to the Federal Ministry of Foreign Affairs
13	Grade 52 and above officers	Refer to the State Protocol and Ceremonial Division
14	Political Secretaries	Refer to the State Protocol and Ceremonial Division
15	District Magistrates	Refer to the Registry of Sabah High Court
16	Justices of Peace	Refer to the State Protocol and Ceremonial Division
17	Companions of the Order of Kinabalu (ASDK)	Refer to the State Protocol and Ceremonial Division
18	Members of Commission established under the State Constitution	See the above list
19	Division Police Chief	Refer to the Police State Contingent
19A	Officers-in-Charge of Police District	Refer to the Police District Office
20	Armed Forces commanding officers	Refer to the Armed Forces
21	Grand Qadhi	Refer to the State Islamic Affairs Department
21A	Division Qadhis	Refer to the State Islamic Affairs Department
22	Grade 41 to 51 officers	Refer to the State Protocol and Ceremonial Division
23	Members of Municipal Councils (Note: Members of local governments take precedence as determined by the Minister of State for Local Government and Housing and their respective local government.) (Note: Kota Kinabalu City Advisors are included and take precedence over all members of local governments.)	Refer to the respective Municipal Council
23A	Members of Town Boards	Refer to the respective Town Board
23B	Members of District Councils	Refer to the respective District Council
24	Religious leaders	Refer to the respective District Office
25	District Chiefs	Refer to the respective District Native Court
26	Assistant District Officers	Refer to the respective District Office
27	Community Development Leaders	Refer to the respective District Office for Community Development
28	Community Development Officers	Refer to the respective District Office for Community Development
29	Native Chiefs	Refer to the respective District Native Court
29A	District Imams	Refer to the respective District Office for Islamic Affairs
29B	Headmen	Refer to the respective District Office for Community Development
30	Chinese Captains	Refer to the respective District Office
31	Members of the Order of Kinabalu (ADK)	Refer to the State Protocol and Ceremonial Division
32	Members of the First Class of the Medal of Kinabalu (BSK)	Refer to the State Protocol and Ceremonial Division
33	Members of the Second Class of the Medal of Kinabalu (BK)	Refer to the State Protocol and Ceremonial Division
34	Chairmen of Village Security and Development Committees	Refer to the respective District Office
35	Village Chiefs	Refer to the respective District Office

== See also ==
- List of post-nominal letters (Sabah)
- Order of Kinabalu
