= Chairman of the Election Commission of Malaysia =

Head of the Election Commission of Malaysia

- Pengerusi Suruhanjaya Pilihan Raya Malaysia ڤڠروسي سوروهنجاي ڤيليهن راي مليسيا
- Incumbent; Ramlan Harun since 26 June 2024
- Election Commission of Malaysia
- Style: Yang Berbahagia
- Reports to: Parliament of Malaysia
- Seat: Putrajaya
- Appointer: Yang di-Pertuan Agong on the advice of Prime Minister and after consultation with the Council of Rulers
- Constituting instrument: Article 114 Federal Constitution
- Formation: 4 September 1957; 69 years ago
- First holder: Mustafa Albakri Hassan
- Salary: RM18,891.29
- Website: www.spr.gov.my

The chairman of the Election Commission of Malaysia (Malay: Pengerusi Suruhanjaya Pilihan Raya Malaysia; Jawi: ڤڠروسي سوروهنجاي ڤيليهن راي مليسيا) heads the Election Commission of Malaysia.

== List of chairman of the Election Commission ==
Since 1957, the Election Commission has been led by 10 Chairman, as shown below :

No.	Portrait	Chairmen	Term of office		
No.	Portrait	Chairmen	Took office	Left office	Time in office
1.		Mustapha Albakri Hassan	4 September 1957	15 October 1967	10 years, 41 days
2.		Tan Sri; Ahmad Perang	16 October 1967	9 August 1977	9 years, 297 days
3.		Tan Sri; Abdul Kadir Talib	10 August 1977	11 October 1990	13 years, 62 days
4.		Datuk; Harun Din	12 October 1990	20 June 1999	8 years, 251 days
5.		Dato'; Omar Mohd Hashim	21 June 1999	11 November 2000	1 year, 143 days
6.		Dato' Sri; Abdul Rashid Abdul Rahman	12 November 2000	30 December 2008	8 years, 48 days
7.		Tan Sri; Abdul Aziz Mohd Yusof	31 December 2008	24 January 2016	7 years, 24 days
8.		Tan Sri; Mohd Hashim Abdullah	24 January 2016	30 June 2018	2 years, 157 days
9.		Datuk; Azhar Azizan Harun (b.1962)	21 September 2018	29 June 2020	1 year, 282 days
10.		Tan Sri; Abdul Ghani Salleh (b.1958)	21 August 2020	9 May 2024	3 years, 262 days
11.		Dato' Sri; Ramlan Harun (b.1964)	26 June 2024	Incumbent	2 years, 74 days
