= Auditor General of Malaysia =

Financial auditor for the Malaysian government

- Ketua Audit Negara
- Incumbent; Wan Suraya Wan Mohd Radzi since 13 June 2023
- National Audit Department
- Style: Yang Berbahagia
- Abbreviation: KAN
- Reports to: Parliament of Malaysia
- Seat: No. 15 Persiaran Perdana, Precinct 2, Putrajaya
- Appointer: Yang di-Pertuan Agong; on the advice of the Prime Minister and after consultation with the Council of Rulers
- Term length: While during the pleasure of Yang di-Pertuan Agong
- Constituting instrument: Article 105 of Constitution of Malaysia; Audit Act 1957
- Formation: 1906
- First holder: William James Parke Hume as Auditor General of the Federated Malay States / States of the Straits Settlement
- Website: www.audit.gov.my

The role of the auditor general of Malaysia is to aid accountability by conducting independent audits on the accounts of Federal Government, State Government and Federal Statutory Bodies as well as the activities of the Ministry/Department/Agency and Companies under the Federal and State Government.

The current Auditor General is Wan Suraya Wan Mohd Radzi who took office on 13 June 2023.

== Appointment ==
According to Article 105 of the Federal Constitution, the auditor general is appointed by the Yang di-Pertuan Agong on the advice of the Prime Minister after consultation with the Council of Rulers. The auditor general is not subject to the authority of the Public Service Commission. The position of Auditor General can be re-elected if he resigns previously. However, he is not allowed to hold other positions at the same time at the Federal or State level.

== List of auditors general ==
No.	Auditors general of the Federated Malay States / States of the Straits Settlement	Term of office		
No.	Auditors general of the Federated Malay States / States of the Straits Settlement	Took office	Left office	Time in office
1.	William James Parke Hume	1906	1911	
2.	F. W. Talbot	1911	1919	
3.	George P. Bradney	1919	1931	

No.	Auditors general of the Colonial Administration	Term of office		
No.	Auditors general of the Colonial Administration	Took office	Left office	Time in office
1.	George P. Bradney	1932	1936	
2.	L. G. Corney	1936	1946	

No.	Auditors of the Malayan Union	Term of office		
No.	Auditors of the Malayan Union	Took office	Left office	Time in office
1.	R. McDonald	1946	1947	

No.	Director of Audit of the Federation of Malaya	Term of office		
No.	Director of Audit of the Federation of Malaya	Took office	Left office	Time in office
1.	R. McDonald	1948	1951	
2.	C. W. S. Seed	1951	1954	

No.	Auditors general of the Federation of Malaya	Term of office		
No.	Auditors general of the Federation of Malaya	Took office	Left office	Time in office
1.	H. M. Watson	1957	1960	
2.	Donald George Bompas	1960	1963	

No.	Auditors general of Malaysia	Term of office		
No.	Auditors general of Malaysia	Took office	Left office	Time in office
1 .	Donald George Bompas	1963	1966	
2.	S. Kandiah	1966	1969	
3.	Mohd Zain Ahmad	1969	1975	
4.	Ahmad Noordin Zakaria	1975	1986	
5.	Ishak Tadin	1986	1994	
6.	Mohd Khalil Mohd Noor	1994	2000	
7.	Hadenan A. Jalil	2000	2006	
8.	Tan Sri; Ambrin Buang	2006	2017	
9.	Tan Sri Dr. Madinah Mohamad	23 February 2017	22 February 2019	1 year, 364 days
10.	Datuk Seri; Nik Azman Nik Abdul Majid	23 February 2019	23 February 2023	4 years, 0 days
11.	Dato' Seri; Wan Suraya Wan Mohd Radzi	13 June 2023	Incumbent	3 years, 103 days

=== Living former auditors general ===
Name	Term of office	Date of birth
Mohd Khalil Mohd Noor	1994–2000	
Hadenan A. Jalil	2000–2006	
Ambrin Buang	2006–2017	
Madinah Mohamad	23 February 2017–22 February 2019	
Nik Azman Nik Abdul Majid	23 February 2019–23 February 2023	
