= National Audit Department (Malaysia) =

- Jabatan Audit Negara جابتن اءوديت نڬارا
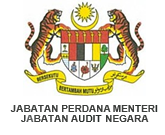

Agency overview
- Formed: 1906; 120 years ago
- Jurisdiction: Government of Malaysia
- Headquarters: Aras 1 - 9, Blok F2 & F3, Kompleks F, Lebuh Perdana Timur, Presint 1, Pusat Pentadbiran Kerajaan Persekutuan, 62000 Putrajaya
- Motto: Quality Audits Enhance Accountability (Audit Berkualiti Meningkatkan Akauntabiliti)
- Employees: 2,041 (2017)
- Annual budget: MYR 156,233,800 (2020)
- Agency executive: Wan Suraya Radzi, Auditor General
- Key documents: Article 105 of the Federal Constitution; Audit Act 1957
- Website: www.audit.gov.my

The National Audit Department (Malay: Jabatan Audit Negara; Jawi: جابتن اءوديت نڬارا) is an independent government agency in Malaysia that is responsible for carrying out the audits on the accounts of Federal Government, State Government and Federal Statutory Bodies as well as the activities of the Ministry/Department/Agency and Companies under the Federal and State Government.

== See also ==
- Auditor General of Malaysia
- Public Accounts Committee (Malaysia)
