= 2016 Pakatan Harapan alternative federal budget =

2016 Alternative budget of the Malaysian Federal Government Averting a crisis
- Country: Malaysia
- Party: Pakatan Harapan
- Total revenue: MYR208 billion
- Total expenditures: MYR238 billion
- Program spending: MYR70.9 billion
- Deficit: MYR30 billion (2.48% of GDP)
- GDP: MYR1,228.6 billion
- Website: Pakatan Harapan Alternative Budget 2016

The Malaysian alternative federal budget for the 2016 fiscal year was launched by Pakatan Harapan on 21 October 2015, two days before the Malaysian Budget Day, as a response to the government's federal budget.

== Areas of direction ==
Some of the key items in the alternative budget were:

- Implementing the capital gains tax since this is also being implemented in 127 countries, including all European countries which are part of the OECD.
- Implementing the inheritance tax since many OECD members already implemented.
- Restructuring of 1Malaysia Development Berhad (1MDB) by putting the firm into administration and prosecuting wrongdoers.
- Separation of Prime Minister and Finance Minister portfolios to avoid excessive concentration of power held by one individual.
- Support extension of Zeti Akhtar Aziz's term as Bank Negara Malaysia governor by two more years.
- For a short term, keeping Goods and Services Tax (GST) system by zero-rating all items to mitigate inflation.
- To set up a petroleum endowment fund for East Malaysians.
- The Kuala Lumpur-Singapore high speed rail (HSR) project funds will instead be reallocated to building a rail network in Sabah and Sarawak.
- Offset the loss of GST income by making MYR30 billion in savings by stamping out "wastage and corruption", and also by shutting down several state-linked corporations.
- Reducing PETRONAS dividend to MYR20 billion.
- Revamping cash handouts such as Bantuan Rakyat 1Malaysia (BR1M) to be conditional on employment and school attendance; the low-income parents must work and send their children to schools.
- Focusing more on agriculture because the country's agricultural policies were “backward, if compared with other countries”; it is necessary to give the subsidies directly to the farmers and also provide a subsidy for the price of rice.
- Parliamentary oversight of sovereign wealth funds for greater accountability, accountability and full independence of regulators which include the Malaysian Anti-Corruption Commission (MACC), Attorney-General of Malaysia, Bank Negara Malaysia and Parliament of Malaysia.
- Focus in bridging the economic activities' gap in Peninsular Malaysia and those in Sabah and Sarawak.

== Total revenues and spending ==
=== Revenues ===
Revenue estimates for 2016 Alternative Budget, excluding 2016 tax measures
1. Companies income tax (33.0%)
2. Individual income tax (15.0%)
3. Petroleum income tax (9.80%)
4. PETRONAS dividend (9.60%)
5. Excise duties from motor vehicles (4.30%)
6. Stamp duty (3.70%)
7. Petroleum royalty (2.60%)
8. Excise duties from tobacco, cigarattes and cigars (1.90%)

(In million MYR)

Source	Projected Revenues	% of Total Projected Revenues
Direct tax Income tax Companies Individual Petroleum Withholding Co-operatives Others Other direct taxes Stamp duty Capital gains tax (proposed tax) Real property gains tax Others	135,571 123,399 68,830 31,265 20,480 2,430 369 25 12,171 7,723 3,500 852 96	65.1% 59.3% 33.0% 15.0% 9.8% 1.2% 0.2% 0.0% 5.8% 3.7% 1.7% 0.4% 0.0%
Indirect tax Excise duties Motor vehicles Tobacco, cigarattes and cigars Spirits and malt liquor Others Sales tax Import duties Others CKD and CBU vehicles Spirits and malt liquor Tobacco, cigarattes and cigars Other indirect taxes Service tax Export duties Crude oil Palm oil Others Levy Goods vehicles Oil palm fruit Goods and services tax	26,784 14,396 9,016 3,974 1,402 3 2,890 2,865 2,217 533 82 33 2,715 1,943 1,824 1,646 175 3 152 152 0 0	12.9 6.9% 4.3% 1.9% 0.7% 0.0% 1.4% 1.4% 1.1% 0.3% 0.0% 0.0% 1.3% 0.9% 0.9% 0.8% 0.1% 0.0% 0.1% 0.1% 0.0% 0.0%
Non-tax revenue Interests and proceeds from investments PETRONAS dividend Others Bank Negara Malaysia dividend Khazanah dividend Licenses, registration fees and permits Petroleum royalty Motor vehicle licenses Others Levy on foreign workers Other non-tax revenue Service fees Fines and penalties Proceeds from sales of goods Rentals	43,618 24,354 20,000 2,204 1,700 450 13,427 5,432 2,824 2,608 2,563 2,456 1,390 1,153 570 268	20.9% 11.7% 9.6% 1.1% 0.8% 0.2% 6.4% 2.6% 1.4% 1.3% 1.2% 1.2% 0.7% 0.6% 0.3% 0.1%
Non-revenue receipts	1,401	0.7%
Revenue from Federal Territories	894	0.4%
Grand Total Revenue	208,268	

=== Expenditures by object ===
These tables are in million MYR.

Description	Projected Expenditures
Operating expenditures
Emoluments	64,995
Supplies and services	15,124
Assets	1,106
Fixed Charges and Grants	85,231
Other Expenditures	1,379
Total Operating Expenditure	167,835
Development expenditures
Direct Grant	65,741
Loans	3,175
Contingencies Reserve	2,000.0
Total Development Expenditure	70,916
Grand Total Expenditure	238,750

== See also ==
- 2016 Malaysian federal budget
