= Ahmad Perang =

Ahmad Perang (born 1910; date of death unknown) was the second chairman of the Election Commission of Malaysia (16 October 1967 – 9 August 1977). He became the first Malayan Railway manager among the Malays.

== Early life ==
Ahmad Perang was born in 1910 in Johor Bahru, Johor. He was married to Puan Sri Salmah Mohd, and together they had 6 children.

Perang attended Sekolah Melayu Bukit Zaharah, Johor Bahru. Then he went to school at Sekolah Sementara, Johor Bahru and to English College Johore Bahru until he passed the School Certificate (1928).

== Career ==
He worked at the Johor Post Department (1929) with his two close friends Encik Rahman Musa and Dato 'Bidin. They were among the earliest Malays employed in the Johor Bharu Post Department.

While in the Postal Service, he was sent to study at the General Office, Singapore. He then served in the Johor Civil Service as an Administrative Officer and continued his studies in England for two years. Unfortunately, the Second World War broke out in Europe and he returned to Malaya without finishing his studies. He has been a Magistrate, District Officer, Audit Officer and State Financial Officer.

He also actively opposed the Malayan Union, although he never entered formal politician.

=== Malayan Railway Manager ===
On 1 October 1961, he became the first Malayan Railway manager among the Malays. The company was known as the Federated Malay State Railway (FMSR) which was led and operated by the British. The British trusted him to lead the FMRS. His career in the Malayan railway began in 1957. He was previously the Johor State Financial Officer. In 1957, Tunku Abdul Rahman asked him to work with the Federal Government as the Chairman of RIDA/ MARA. He was appointed a member of the Board of Directors of the Malayan Railways (1957-1959). He was appointed General Manager of the Railways on 1 October 1961 replacing E.T. William who moved to another position. Dato 'Ahmad Perang was the first to be handed over to the Malays after 77 years of the history of the railway service in Malaya. He held this position until 1968. After retiring he was appointed Chairman of the Election Commission in 1967.

=== Chairman of the Election Committee ===
When he was the chairman of the EC, two Malaysian elections were held, namely the 1969 Malaysian general election and the 1974 Malaysian general election. A total of 3.8 million registered voters during the 1969 election held on May 10, 1969. Pursuant to Article 114 in bracket 1, the members of the Election Commission shall be appointed by the Yang di-Pertuan Agong after consultation with the Conference of Rulers, and shall consist of a chairman, a deputy chairman and five other members. Therefore, some have suggested that the EC chairman be appointed from a Federal Court judge because he is knowledgeable about the law and is able to act fairly, independently and transparently compared to a government retiree. The first EC chairman was Datuk Mustafa Albakri Hassan (1957-1967); Second chairman, Tan Sri Datuk Ahmad Perang (1967- 1977); The third chairman, Tan Sri Datuk Abdul Kadir Talib (1977-1990), the fourth chairman, Datuk Harun Din (1990-1990); Fifth Chairman Datuk Omar Mohd Hashim (1999-2000); The sixth chairman is Tan Sri Datuk Seri Ab Rashid Ab Rahman and the 7th chairman is Tan Sri Abdul Aziz Mohd Yusof.

== Awards and honours ==
- Malaya :
  - Commander of the Order of the Defender of the Realm (PMN) – Tan Sri (1958)
- Malaysia :
  - Recipient of the Malaysian Commemorative Medal (Gold) (PPM) (1965)
- Johor :
  - Companion of the Order of the Crown of Johor (SMJ) (1951)
  - Knight Commander of the Order of the Crown of Johor (DPMJ) – Dato' (1959)

Ingratitude Taman Ahmad Perang Mosque, Kota Tinggi, Johor is named after him.
