= List of post-nominal letters (Sabah) =

This is a list of post-nominal letters used in Sabah. The order in which they follow an individual's name is the same as the order of precedence for the wearing of order insignias, decorations, and medals. When applicable, non-hereditary titles are indicated.

Grades		Post-nominal	Title	Wive's title	Ribbon
The Illustrious Order of Kinabalu - Darjah Yang Amat Mulia Kinabalu
Grand Commander	Seri Panglima Darjah Kinabalu	S.P.D.K.	Datuk Seri Panglima	Datin Seri Panglima	
Commander	Panglima Gemilang Darjah Kinabalu	P.G.D.K.	Datuk	Datin	
Companion	Ahli Setia Darjah Kinabalu	A.S.D.K.	--	--	
Member	Ahli Darjah Kinabalu	A.D.K.	--	--	
Grand Star	Bintang Seri Kinabalu	B.S.K.	--	--	
Star	Bintang Kinabalu	B.K.	--	--	
Medal	Pingat Perkhidmatan Terpuji	P.P.T.	--	--	
Certificate of Honour	Sijil Kehormat	S.K.	--	--	

Precedence:

1.	Seri Panglima Darjah Kinabalu	S.P.D.K.	Datuk Seri Panglima
2.	Panglima Gemilang Darjah Kinabalu	P.G.D.K.	Datuk
3.	Ahli Setia Darjah Kinabalu	A.S.D.K.	--
4.	Ahli Darjah Kinabalu	A.D.K.	--
5.	Bintang Seri Kinabalu	B.S.K.	--
6.	Bintang Kinabalu	B.K.	--
7.	Pingat Perkhidmatan Terpuji	P.P.T.	--
8.	Sijil Kehormat	S.K.	--

== See also ==
- Order of precedence in Sabah
