= Ramlan Harun =

Malaysian civil servant

Yang Berbahagia Dato' Sri Ramlan Harun SSAP DIMP PPN

11th Chairman of the Election Commission of Malaysia
- Incumbent
- Assumed office 26 June 2024
- Monarch: Ibrahim Iskandar
- Prime Minister: Anwar Ibrahim
- Deputy: Azmi Sharom
- Preceded by: Abdul Ghani Salleh

Personal details
- Born: 1964 (age 61–62)
- Education: Universiti Putra Malaysia (UPM) (Master's Degree in Land Resource Management); Universiti Sains Malaysia (USM) (Bachelor's Degree in Housing and Building Planning); Institut Tadbiran Awam Negara (INTAN) (Diploma in Public Administration)

Ramlan bin Harun is a Malaysian civil servant who has served as Chairman of the Election Commission of Malaysia (EC) since June 2024. Prior to that, he served as Secretary-General of the Ministry of Rural Development.

== Background ==
Ramlan Harun was born in 1964. He holds a master's degree in Land Resource Management from Universiti Putra Malaysia (UPM) and a bachelor's degree in Housing and Building Planning from Universiti Sains Malaysia (USM) as well as a Diploma in Public Administration from Institut Tadbiran Awam Negara (INTAN).

== Civil career ==
Ramlan has experience in public service for 28 years and has served in several ministries, departments and administrations at the state level. On 16 June 2016, He served as Deputy Director-General (Development) of National Housing Department of the Ministry of Urban Wellbeing, Housing and Local Government. On 1 January 2018, Ramlan served as Director of Social Services Section of the Economic Planning Unit based on Prime Minister's Department. On 4 March 2019, he served as Secretary of Development Division of the Ministry of Health.

On 10 August 2020, Ramlan served as Deputy Secretary-General (Management) of the Ministry of Home Affairs. On 1 October 2021, Ramlan served as Secretary-General of the Ministry of Rural Development. After that, he was retired.

Ramlan (left) overseeing the election process during the 2026 Malacca state election.

On 26 June 2024, Ramlan was appointed as Chairman of the Election Commission of Malaysia, succeed Abdul Ghani Salleh who retired on 9 May 2024. The announcement made by Chief Secretary to the Government of Malaysia, Mohd Zuki Ali after being approved by Yang di-Pertuan Agong, Sultan Ibrahim.

== Honours ==
- Malaysia
  - Medal of the Order of the Defender of the Realm (PPN) (2000)
- Pahang
  - Knight Companion of the Order of the Crown of Pahang (DIMP) – Dato' (2011)
  - Knight Grand Companion of the Order of Sultan Ahmad Shah of Pahang (SSAP) – Dato' Sri (2022)
