= Election Commission of Malaysia =

Malaysian government agency

Election Commission of Malaysia (EC)
- Suruhanjaya Pilihan Raya Malaysia سوروهنجاي ڤيليهن راي مليسيا (SPR)
- Agency logo

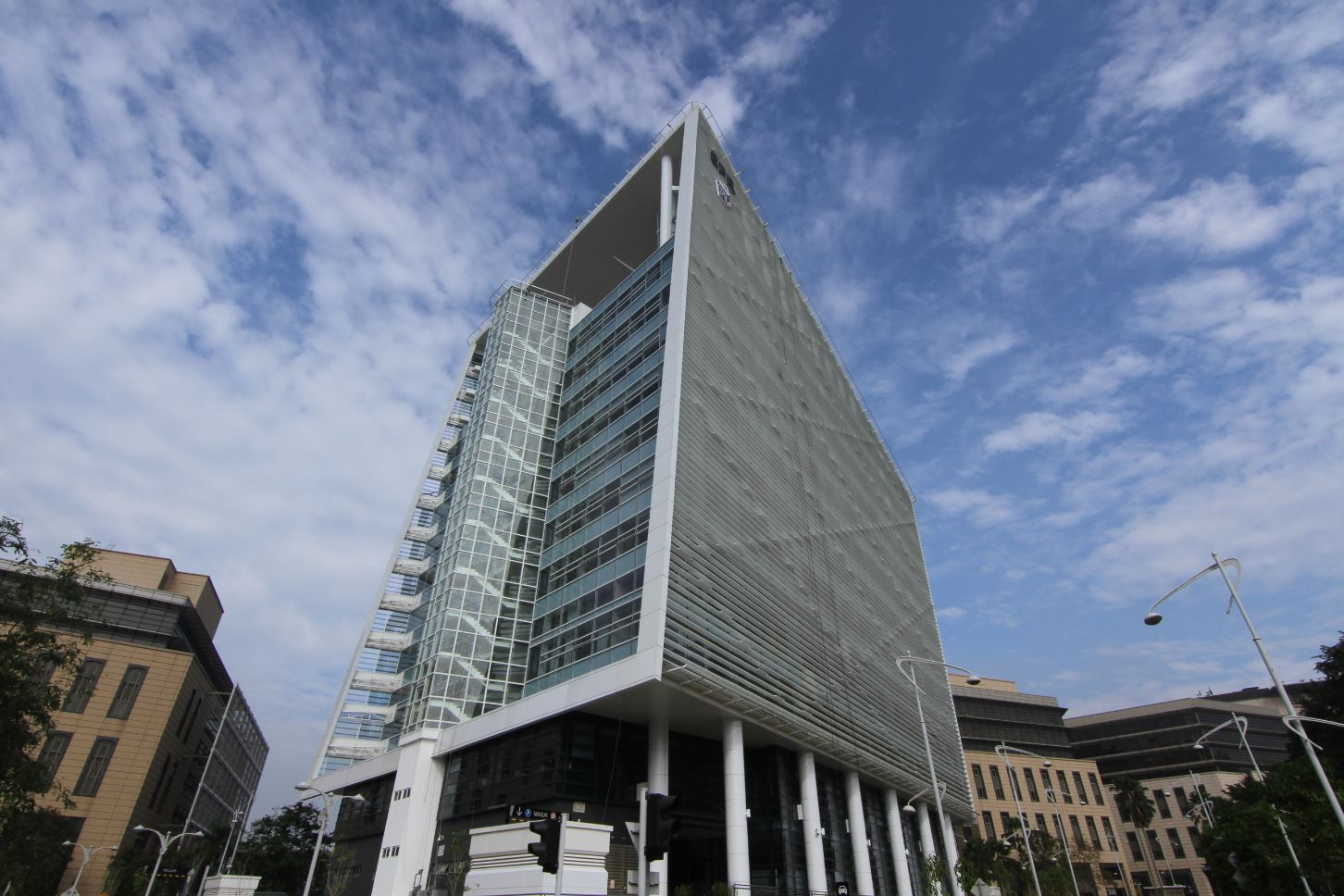

Commission overview
- Formed: 4 September 1957; 68 years ago
- Type: Regulating and conducting elections in Malaysia
- Jurisdiction: Government of Malaysia
- Headquarters: 2, Jalan P2T, Presint 2, Pusat Pentadbiran Kerajaan Persekutuan, 62100, Putrajaya
- Motto: Efficient and Transparent (Cekap dan Telus)
- Employees: 755 (2017)
- Annual budget: MYR 165,467,800 (2025)
- Commission executives: Ramlan Harun, Chairman; Azmi Sharom, Deputy Chairman; Khairul Shahril Idrus, Secretary
- Parent department: Prime Minister's Department
- Key documents: Article 114 of the Federal Constitution of Malaysia; Election Commission Act 1957; Elections Act 1958; Election Offences Act 1954
- Website: www.spr.gov.my

The Election Commission of Malaysia (Malay: Suruhanjaya Pilihan Raya Malaysia; Jawi: سوروهنجاي ڤيليهن راي مليسيا), abbreviated SPR or EC, is a commission set up for ensuring fair and equitable operations in undertaking the elections in Malaysia. The agency falls under the purview of the Prime Minister's Department.

== History ==
The Election Commission (EC) was formed on 4 September 1957, under Article 114 of the Constitution of Malaysia, which empowers it to conduct elections for the Dewan Rakyat and state legislative bodies.

At its establishment, the EC only consisted of a chairman and two members – Datuk Dr Mustafa Albakri Hassan together with Lee Ewe Boon and Ditt Singh.

A secretariat was also set up to fulfil the commission's functions and carry out its decisions, with a secretary made the chief administrator. The first EC secretary was H. Cassidy.

After the formation of Malaysia in 1963 and the inclusion of Sabah and Sarawak, another member was added to represent the two states on a rotation basis. Datuk Abang Marzuki Nor from Sarawak was the first such member appointed.

An amendment to Article 114 made in 1981 provided for the new post of a deputy chairman, and Abdul Rahman Abdul Hassan was the first to hold this position.

Today, the EC has a chairman, a deputy chairman and five members, all appointed by the Yang di-Pertuan Agong after consulting the Conference of Rulers.

== Constitutional mandate ==
Under Article 114, the commission is empowered to "conduct elections to the House of Representatives (Dewan Rakyat, the lower house of Parliament) and the Legislative Assemblies of the States". Under the Constitution of the independent Federation of Malaya, the Commission comprised one chairman and two members, but after Malaya merged with North Borneo, Sarawak and Singapore to form Malaysia, the commission's membership was expanded by constitutional amendment to provide for an additional member from Sabah or Sarawak. A 1981 amendment to the Constitution added another member and created the post of deputy chairman.

The commission has the power to delimit constituencies, revise the electoral roll of registered voters, and regulate the manner in which elections are conducted. Although the Constitution does not refer to the commission as being a body independent from influence by the government or otherwise, constitutional scholars have generally considered the Constitution as intending to protect the independence of the commission. Among other things, commissioners are protected by tenure, and may only be removed through the same procedure as a judge of the Supreme Court. The terms of remuneration of a commissioner cannot be altered to his disadvantage after he has been appointed.

Members of the commission are appointed by the Yang di-Pertuan Agong (King), who must consult with the Conference of Rulers and appoint a Commission which has the confidence of the public. Although the Constitution does not expressly require consultation with the Prime Minister in this regard, it has been argued that under Article 40 of the Constitution, the King cannot act on his own discretion unless explicitly stated; in all other cases, he must acquiesce to the advice of the Prime Minister, and as such the appointments to the commission are made with the advice of the Prime Minister. Members of the Commission retire at the age of 65.

== Functions ==
Apart from regulating elections, the EC's duties include reviewing the boundaries of parliamentary and state constituencies, holding by-elections and carrying out registration exercises.

It also collects information on newly developed areas to ensure a fair representation of voters in each constituency, promotes awareness on how important it is to vote and revises the electoral roll by deleting the names of those who are dead or have been disqualified.

On polling day, EC members and officers will be stationed at polling centre nationwide to oversee the process.

== Controversies ==
The EC has been accused of being half-hearted in electoral reforms and in 2012, the chairperson and the deputy chairperson was accused to be members of the ruling party. Both individuals admitted to may have been members at some point, but the deputy chairperson later retracted the admission and denounced it as an attempt to besmirch the EC.

During the 14th Malaysia General Election on 9 May 2018, EC was accused of allowing gross gerrymandering and malapportionment practices by the incumbent government. It was also reprimanded as the ballot counting process was the longest in Malaysia's history, with the results still being streamed in after 4 a.m. the following day (10 May 2018, GMT +8:00). EC has also been accused of making the election day on a weekday rather a weekend. It currently denies that it tried to stop overseas Malaysians to vote.

== Members of the Election Commission ==
As of July 2024

Role	Name	Background
Chairman	Ramlan Harun	Civil service
Deputy Chairman	Azmi Sharom	Academics & law
Member	Lee Bee Phang	Police
Member	Zoe Randhawa	Non-governmental Organisation
Member	Sapdin Ibrahim	Civil service
Member	Mohd Faisal Syam Abdol Hazis	Academics & International relations
Member	Wan Ahmad Uzir Wan Sulaiman	Civil service

== List of Chairmen of the Election Commission ==
No.	Chairmen	Term of office		
No.	Chairmen	Took office	Left office	Time in office
1	Mustapha Albakri Hassan	4 September 1957	15 October 1967	10 years, 41 days
2	Ahmad Perang	16 October 1967	9 August 1977	9 years, 297 days
3	Abdul Kadir Talib	10 August 1977	11 October 1990	13 years, 62 days
4	Harun Din	12 October 1990	20 June 1999	8 years, 251 days
5	Omar Mohd Hashim	21 June 1999	11 November 2000	1 year, 143 days
6	Abdul Rashid Abdul Rahman	12 November 2000	30 December 2008	8 years, 48 days
7	Abdul Aziz Mohd Yusof	31 December 2008	24 January 2016	7 years, 24 days
8	Mohamad Hashim Abdullah	24 January 2016	30 June 2018	2 years, 157 days
9	Azhar Azizan Harun	21 September 2018	29 June 2020	1 year, 282 days
10	Abdul Ghani Salleh	21 August 2020	9 May 2024	3 years, 262 days
11	Ramlan Harun	26 June 2024	Incumbent	2 years, 43 days

== Notes and references ==
- Mohamed-Rela-Appointment
