= Syed Danial Syed Ahmad =

Malaysian civil servant and Keeper of the Rulers' Seal

Yang Berbahagia Tan Sri Dato' Seri Syed Danial Syed Ahmad PSM SPMP SPSK SSAP PSD DMPN DPMP DPMS DSPN PCM KMN
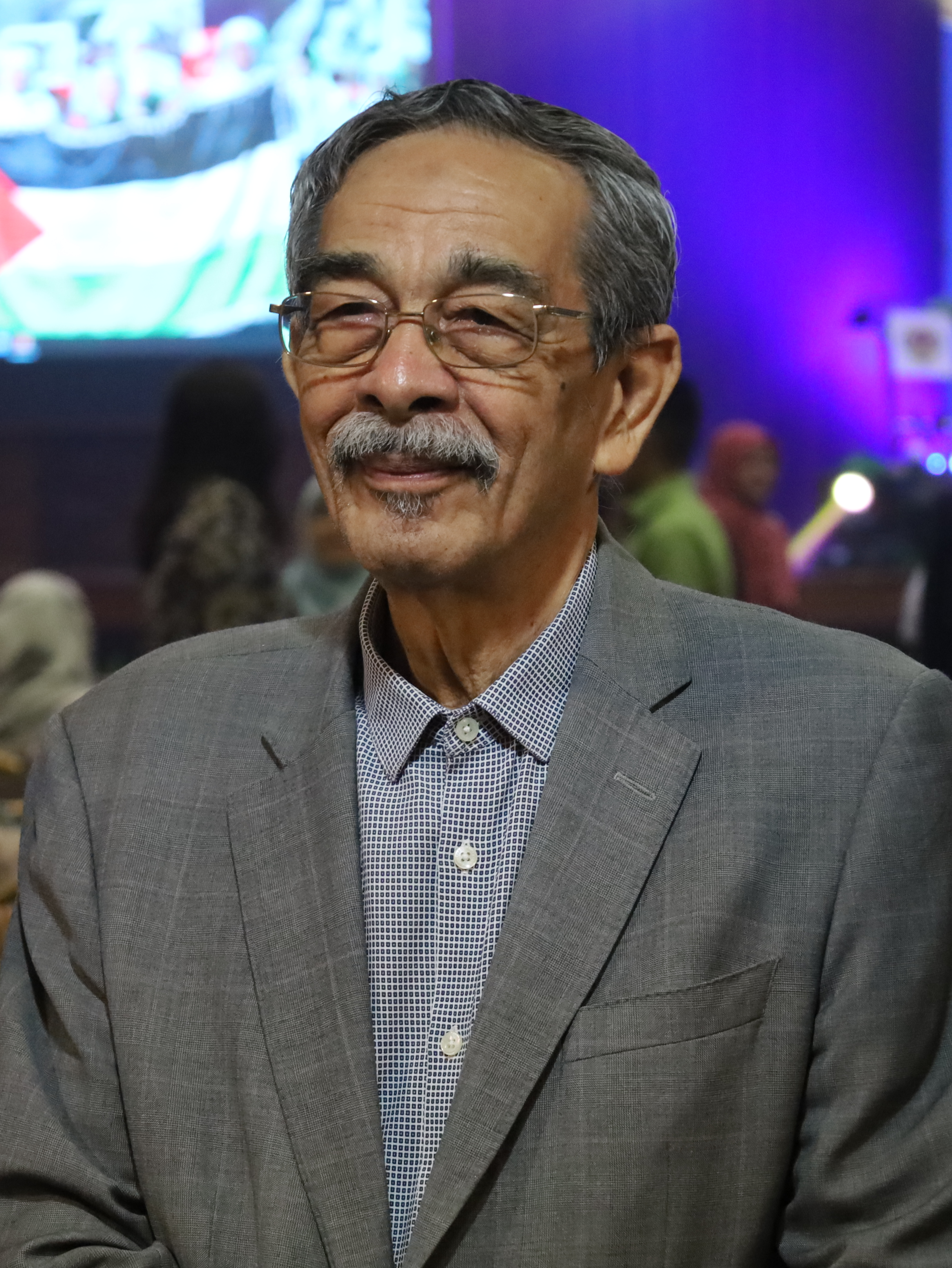

Keeper of the Rulers' Seal
- Incumbent
- Assumed office 10 January 2011
- Monarchs: Mizan Zainal Abidin; Abdul Halim; Muhammad V; Abdullah; Ibrahim
- Prime Minister: Najib Razak; Mahathir Mohamad; Muhyiddin Yassin; Ismail Sabri Yaakob; Anwar Ibrahim
- Preceded by: Engku Ibrahim Engku Ngah

Personal details
- Born: Syed Danial bin Syed Ahmad; 30 November 1944 (age 81) Georgetown, Penang, Japanese occupation of Malaya

Tan Sri Dato' Seri Syed Danial bin Syed Ahmad (born 30 November 1944) is a Malaysian civil servant who is currently serving as the Keeper of the Rulers' Seal since 10 January 2011. In his role as Keeper of the Rulers' Seal, he has played an important role during the proclamation and formal oath-taking ceremony of the Yang di-Pertuan Agong.

== Early life and education ==
Syed Danial Syed Ahmad was born on 30 November 1944 (concurrently 14 Dhul Hijjah 1363) in Georgetown, Penang.

He received his primary education at Kelawai Malay School, Penang, and further continued his studies at Malay College Kuala Kangsar (MCKK), Perak, before pursuing his Bachelor's of Arts at University of Malaya, attaining his degree in 1967. He pursued his higher studies in Master of Arts at University of Wisconsin–Madison in 1976.

== Career ==
Syed Danial has served as a government civil servant for 32 years holding various positions in government ministries, agencies and departments between May 1967 and December 1999. He served in Sarawak, Sabah, Perak, Kedah and Perlis. Upon his retirement, he was appointed Datuk Paduka Maharaja Lela (Grand Chamberlain) at the Istana Negara in 2002 and held the position until 2004. Upon relinquishing the position of the Grand Chamberlain, he was appointed as Datuk Pengelola Bijaya Diraja and served between 2004 and 2006. He was also appointed as a member of the Armed Forces Council by the Conference of Rulers under provisions of Article 137 of the Federal Constitution.

On 10 January 2011, he was appointed as the Keeper of the Rulers' Seal by Yang di-Pertuan Agong Sultan Mizan Zainal Abidin succeeding Engku Ibrahim Engku Ngah who had earlier retired after serving in the position for 22 years. As the Keeper of the Rulers' Seal, he has played a prominent role during the formal installation and swearing-in ceremonies of the Yang di-Pertuan Agongs in 2012, 2017, 2019 and 2024. Apart from that, he has coordinated with the rulers of the Malay states on national matters and announcing the annual dates of fasting for the festival of Eid al-Fitr and Eid al-Adha at the order of the Yang di-Pertuan Agong with the approval of the Malay rulers.

== Honours ==
- Malaysia
  - Commander of the Order of Loyalty to the Crown of Malaysia (PSM) – Tan Sri (2017)
  - Commander of the Order of Loyalty to the Royal Family of Malaysia (PSD) – Datuk (2004)
  - Officer of the Order of the Defender of the Realm (KMN) (1981)
- Kelantan
  - Grand Commander of the Order of Loyalty to the Crown of Kelantan (SPSK) – Dato' (2013)
- Pahang
  - Grand Companion of the Order of Sultan Ahmad Shah of Pahang (SSAP) – Dato' Sri (2012)
- Penang
  - Companion of the Order of the Defender of State (DMPN) – Dato' (2012)
  - Lieutenant of the Order of the Defender of State (DSPN) – Dato' (1998)
- Perak
  - Grand Commander of the Order of the Perak State Crown (SPMP) – Dato' Seri (2024)
  - Companion of the Order of Cura Si Manja Kini (PCM) (1986)
- Perlis
  - Commander of the Order of the Crown of Perlis (DPMP) – Dato' (1990)
- Selangor
  - Commander of the Order of the Crown of Selangor (DPMS) – Dato' (2012)
