= Wan Suraya Radzi =

Malaysian civil servant

Yang Berbahagia Dato' Seri Wan Suraya Radzi SPMP SSNS PMW KMN
- وان سورايا وان محمد راضي
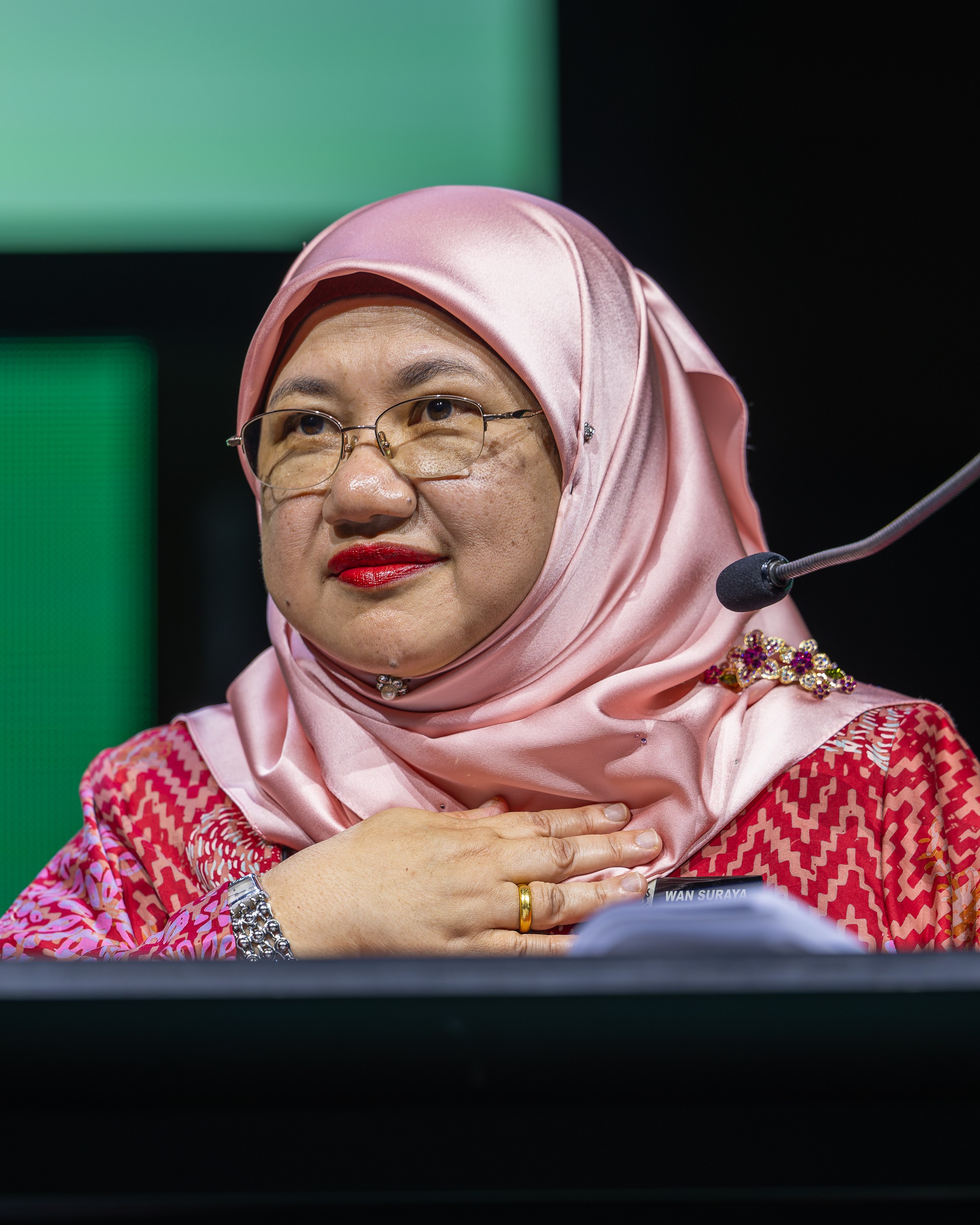
- Wan Suraya in 2026

11th Auditor General of Malaysia
- Incumbent
- Assumed office 13 June 2023
- Preceded by: Nik Azman Nik Abdul Majid

Personal details
- Born: Wan Suraya binti Wan Mohd Radzi
- Education: University of Sheffield (LLB)

Wan Suraya binti Wan Mohd Radzi is a Malaysian civil servant who has been Auditor General of Malaysia since June 2023.

== Background ==
Wan Suraya Radzi graduated with a Bachelor of Laws (Hons) from the University of Sheffield, United Kingdom.

== Career ==
Suraya has been a civil servant for 25 years with the first position she held as assistant director of International Trade Division of the Ministry of International Trade and Industry on 19 February 1995. She was Senior Director of the Sectoral Policy Division, Ministry of International Trade and Industry on 8 June 2015. She was Deputy Secretary General (Strategy and Monitoring) of the Ministry of International Trade and Industry on 2 July 2016.

She was Secretary General of the Ministry of Entrepreneur Development on 2 July 2018. She served in Special Placement Position, Public Service Department on 23 March 2020. She later was Secretary General of the Ministry of National Unity on 30 March 2020.

On 9 August 2021, she was transferred to Public Service Department. On 7 March 2022, She was chief executive officer of the Integrity Institute of Malaysia (IIM). Since June 2023, she has been Auditor General of Malaysia.

== Honours ==
- Malaysia
  - Officer of the Order of the Defender of the Realm (KMN) (2014)
- Federal Territory (Malaysia)
  - Commander of the Order of the Territorial Crown (PMW) – Datuk (2019)
- Negeri Sembilan
  - Knight Grand Companion of the Order of Loyalty to Negeri Sembilan (SSNS) – Dato' Seri (2026)
- Perak
  - Knight Grand Commander of the Order of the Perak State Crown (SPMP) – Dato' Seri (2024)
