= Keeper of the Rulers' Seal =

Government official in Malaysia

- Penyimpan Mohor Besar Raja-raja ڤڽيمڤن موهور بسر راج٢
- Logo of the Office of the Keeper of the Rulers’ Seal
- Incumbent; Syed Danial Syed Ahmad since January 2011
- Appointer: Conference of Rulers
- Inaugural holder: Raja Ayob Raja Bot
- Formation: 1948
- Website: www.majlisraja-raja.gov.my

The Keeper of the Rulers' Seal (Malay: Penyimpan Mohor Besar Raja-raja, Jawi: ڤنڽيمڤن موهور بسر راج٢) is the government official in Malaysia charged with custody and use of the Rulers' Seal of Malaysia on behalf of the Conference of Rulers. The Rulers' Seal is the symbol of the traditional authority of the royal institutions in Malaysia, namely the Yang di-Pertuan Agong (King of Malaysia) and the hereditary rulers of the states of Malaysia. The Keeper of the Rulers' Seal is the secretary to the Conference of Rulers and convenes the Conference three times a year, or at the request of the Yang di-Pertuan Agong. He is appointed by the Conference as specified in the Constitution of Malaysia.

His most publicly visible role is to announce the beginning of fasting during the month of Ramadan, and the dates of the Muslim religious holidays, Aidilfitri and Aidiladha, in Malaysia.

== History ==
The office of the Keeper of the Rulers' Seal was established in preparation for the first meeting of the Conference of Rulers on February 18, 1948. Prior to independence, the Keeper of the Rulers' Seal was a senior government position, equal in stature to the most senior Menteri Besar among the states in the Federation of Malaya. This changed after independence in 1957, when all the rulers became constitutional monarchs under the federal and state constitutions.

== Role ==
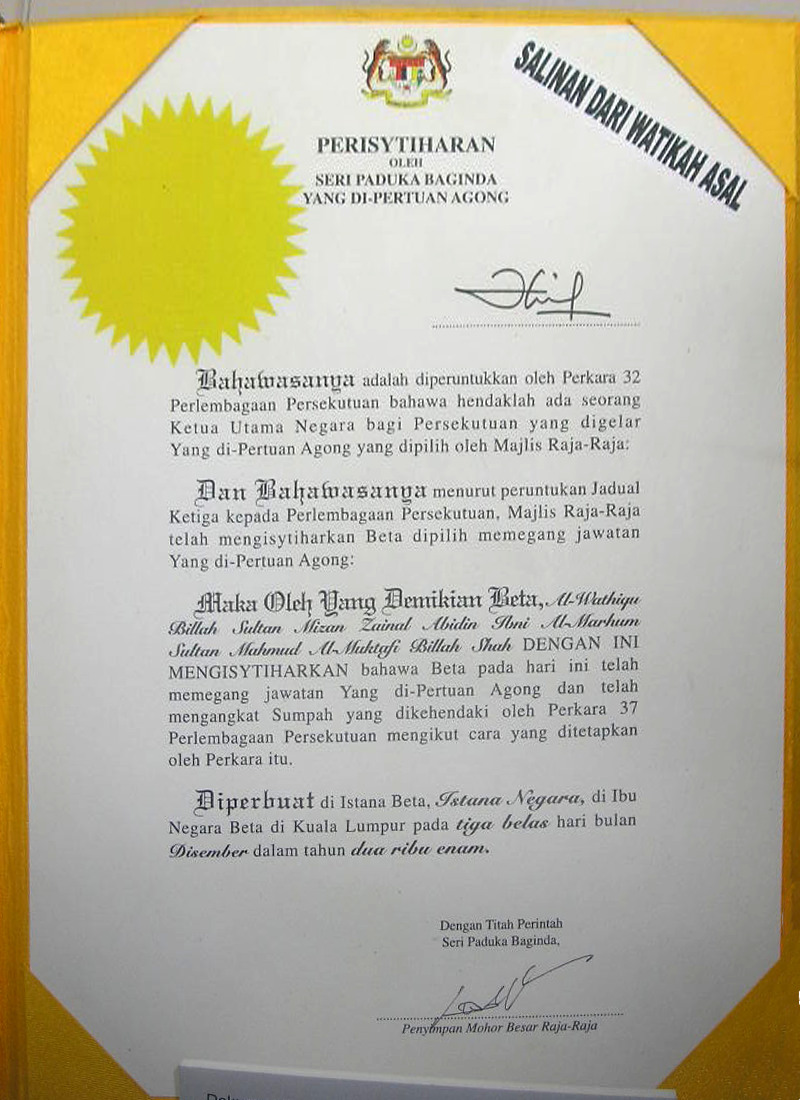
Instrument of appointment of the Yang di-Pertuan Agong, issued by the Keeper of the Rulers' Seal, and printed with the Rulers' Seal.

The Keeper of the Rulers' Seal's primary administrative responsibility is to convene the Conference of Rulers by serving notices to the nine hereditary rulers and four non-hereditary Yang di-Pertua Negeri (governors). His office is responsible for arranging the transportation of the rulers and governors from their respective states to the meeting venue. During special meetings of the Conference to elect a new Yang di-Pertuan Agong, he is responsible for distributing and then counting the ballot papers, which are kept secret.

The second highest position in the Office of the Keeper of the Rulers' Seal is the Assistant Secretary of the Conference of Rulers, who assists in managing the Conference's meetings and elections.

== List of Keepers of the Rulers' Seal ==
Listed below are Keepers of the Rulers' Seal from 1948 to present:

#	Keeper of the Rulers' Seal	From	To	Duration
1	Raja Ayob Raja Bot	February 1948	May 1948	90 days
2	Abdullah Nordin	June 1948	December 1949	1 year, 214 days
3	Raja Shahar Shah Raja Haron	April 1949	December 1949	275 days
4	Tengku Husin Tengku Yahaya	January 1950	May 1950	120 days
5	Tunku Ya'acob Sultan Abdul Hamid Halim Shah	May 1950	January 1952	1 year, 276 days
6	Mustafa Al-Bakri Hasan	February 1952	January 1954	2 years, 1 day
7	Tunku Ya'acob ibni Al-Marhum Sultan Abdul Hamid Halim Shah	February 1954	December 1955	1 year, 334 days
8	Mustafa Al-Bakri Hasan	January 1956	August 1957	1 year, 243 days
9	Abdul Rahim Abdul Rauf	September 1957	May 1963	5 years, 274 days
Acting	Tunku Shahriman Tunku Sulaiman	June 1963	August 1963	92 days
Acting	Aziz Zakaria	September 1963	October 1963	30 days
10	Ahmad Husin	October 1963	September 1980	17 years, 5 days
11	Ahmad Zainal Abidin Muhammad Yusof	October 1980	September 1988	8 years, 2 days
Acting	Abdul Rahim Kassim, Assistant Secretary of the Conference of Rulers	October 1988	December 1988	92 days
12	Engku Ibrahim Engku Ngah	January 1989	January 2011	22 years, 5 days
13	Syed Danial Syed Ahmad	January 2011	present	12 years, 124 days

== See also ==
- Keeper of the Seals
