= Conference of Rulers =

Council of Malaysian Rulers

Conference of Rulers Majlis Raja-Raja مجليس راج٢

Type
- Term limits: 5 years

History
- Founded: 18 February 1948
- Preceded by: Council of Rulers of the Federated States

Leadership
- Chairman: Rotates per meeting
- Keeper of the Rulers' Seal: Syed Danial Syed Ahmad
- Assistant Secretary of the Conference of Rulers: Mohd Aseral bin Jusman

Structure
- Seats: 13
- Voting members: 9
- Non-voting members: 4

Meeting place
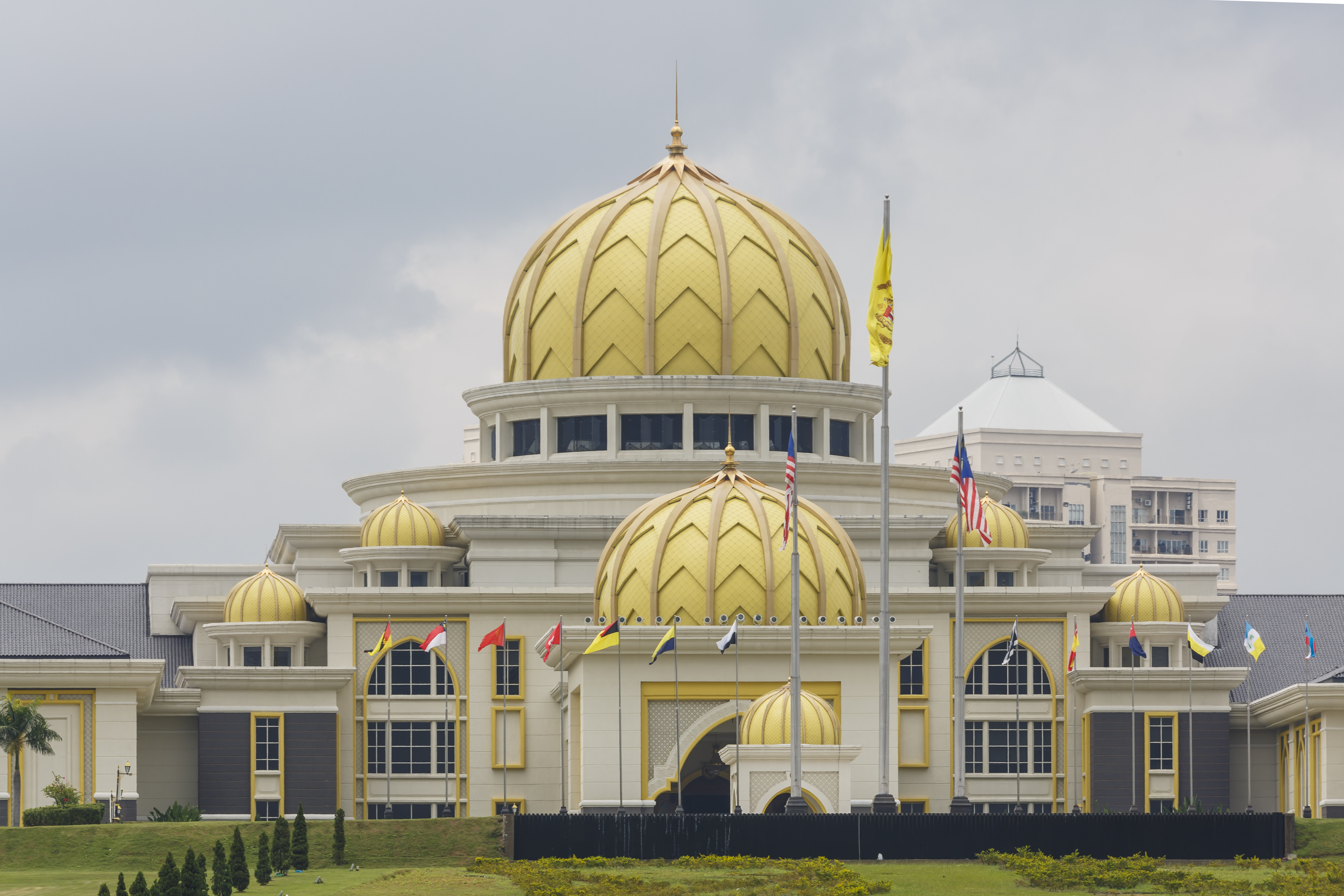
- Istana Negara, Kuala Lumpur, Malaysia (Venue used since 13 December 2011)

Website
- www.majlisraja-raja.gov.my

Constitution
- Article 38, Federal Constitution of Malaysia

The Conference of Rulers (also known as Council of Rulers or Durbar, Malay: Majlis Raja-Raja; Jawi: مجليس راج٢) is a council comprising the nine rulers of the Malay states, and the governors of the other four states in Malaysia. It was officially established by Article 38 of the Constitution of Malaysia, and is the only such institution in the world, according to the Malaysian National Library.

Its main responsibility is the election of the Yang di-Pertuan Agong (King of Malaysia) and Timbalan Yang di-Pertuan Agong (Deputy King of Malaysia), which occurs every five years or when the positions fall vacant (either through death, resignation, or removal from office). Although its position in the process of elective monarchy is unique, the Conference of Rulers also plays a role in amending the Constitution of Malaysia and some other policies, in particular, those Articles which have been "entrenched", namely those pertaining to the status of the rulers, the special privileges of the indigenous Bumiputra (see Article 153 of the Constitution of Malaysia), the status of the Malay language as the national language, and the clause governing the entrenchment of such Articles.

== History ==
The Conference of Rulers has its origins in the 1897 Durbar, the Council of Rulers for the Federated Malay States, which were not under the British colonial regime, with the British having an advisory role on only a very few administrative items and the full authority to govern remaining with the rulers of those states. Only the four Federated Malay States of Perak, Selangor, Negeri Sembilan, and Pahang were represented at the Durbar, which first convened in 1897. The purpose of the Durbar, as described by Resident-General Frank Swettenham, was to "bring home to the Malays, in the most striking manner possible, the reality of federation".

After World War II, a similar body called the Council of Rulers was constituted under the short-lived Malayan Union. The Council comprised the Governor of the Union, who acted as president, the nine rulers, and the Chief Secretary, Attorney-General and Financial Secretary as ex officio members. The sole functions of the Council were to consider legislation related to Islam (a function carried out by a subcommittee of the Council, comprising only the Muslim members) and to advise the Governor of the Union or the ruler of any state as necessary.

The first Conference of Rulers was convened on 31 August 1948, the year the British established the semi-autonomous Federation of Malaya, and was attended by the rulers of all nine Malay states. The Conference of Rulers continued after independence, when it was formally established under the Constitution.

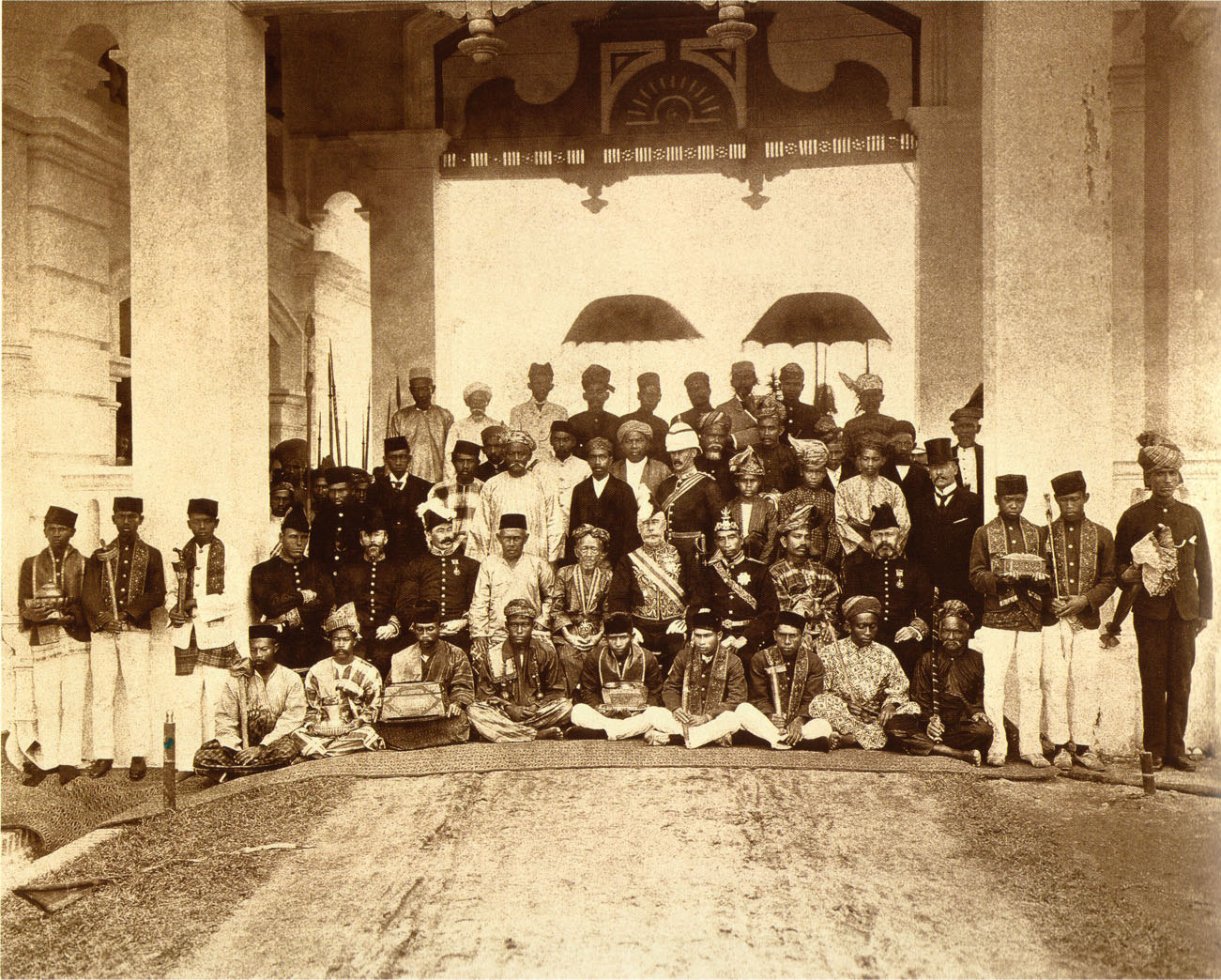
First Malay Rulers Durbar held at the Istana Negara in Kuala Kangsar, Perak in 1897.

== Membership ==
The membership of the Conference depends on the succession of the Malay rulers, and the appointment of the governors. The king appoints the governors of the states, while each state has its own procedure for succession to the throne. One, Negeri Sembilan, is itself an elective monarchy.

Only the rulers of the Malay states—Negeri Sembilan, Selangor, Perlis, Terengganu, Kedah, Kelantan, Pahang, Johor, and Perak—are permitted to participate in the election of the King and Deputy King of Malaysia and to stand as candidates. The governors of the other states (Penang, Malacca, Sabah, and Sarawak) do not participate when the Conference of Rulers meets to decide matters related to the election or removal of the king or his deputy, those related to privileges of the Malay rulers and those related to the observance of Islam.

Should a member of the Conference be unable to attend a meeting, their state must designate a temporary replacement. This process is set out by each state's own constitution, and therefore varies. Once elected, the king delegates their state representation in the Conference to the regent they have selected to rule in their stead in their home state. The king still attends the meetings of the Conference, though they do so intermittently, usually only when the Conference would be discussing national policy or electing a new king. When attending Conference meetings, each ruler is accompanied by their Menteri Besar, each governor by their Chief Minister, and in the case of Sarawak, by their Premier. When the king attends, he is accompanied by the Prime Minister.

Every meeting of the conference is chaired by one of the nine Malay rulers, who is appointed rotationally.

Current members of the Conference of Rulers
State	Portrait	Member	Title	Assumed office
Negeri Sembilan		Muhriz	Yang di-Pertuan Besar of Negeri Sembilan	29 December 2008 (Note: The Undang Yang Empat did not recognize Tuanku Muhriz as the legitimate Yang di-Pertuan Besar of Negeri Sembilan since the 2026 Negeri Sembilan constitutional crisis and installed Tunku Nadzaruddin Tuanku Ja'afar as the new Yang di-Pertuan Besar of Negeri Sembilan. However, the installation was not recognized by both federal and state governments and the Tunku Besar Seri Menanti. Tuanku Muhriz continues to have de jure rule over Negeri Sembilan.)
Selangor		Sharafuddin Idris Shah	Sultan of Selangor	21 November 2001
Perlis		Sirajuddin	Raja of Perlis	17 April 2000
Terengganu		Mizan Zainal Abidin	Sultan of Terengganu	15 May 1998
Kedah		Sallehuddin	Sultan of Kedah	11 September 2017
Kelantan		Muhammad V	Sultan of Kelantan	13 September 2010
Pahang		Abdullah	Sultan of Pahang	11 January 2019
Johor		Ibrahim Iskandar	Sultan of Johor	23 January 2010
Perak		Nazrin Shah	Sultan of Perak	29 May 2014
Sarawak		Wan Junaidi Tuanku Jaafar	Yang di-Pertua Negeri of Sarawak	26 January 2024
Sabah		Musa Aman	Yang di-Pertua Negeri of Sabah	1 January 2025
Malacca		Mohd Ali Rustam	Yang di-Pertua Negeri of Malacca	4 June 2020
Penang		Ramli Ngah Talib	Yang di-Pertua Negeri of Penang	1 May 2025

== Roles and procedure ==
The National Library has called the Conference of Rulers "the supreme institution in the country", which would mean even Parliament is subordinate to it. However, its role is de facto largely symbolic, as even the election of the King of Malaysia generally follows a fixed order based on the seniority of the Malay rulers at the time of independence in 1957.

In policy-making, if the Conference of Rulers is involved, the king is constitutionally required to consult with not only the prime minister and the royal and non-royal members of the Conference, but also with the Menteri Besar/Chief Minister/Premier of each state of Malaysia.

=== Amending the Constitution ===
The Conference's role in amending the Constitution was first set out by the Constitution (Amendment) Act 1971, one of the first pieces of legislation passed by Parliament after the catastrophic May 13 Incident, which saw at least 200 deaths after racial rioting in the federal capital of Kuala Lumpur.

The Act named Article 152, 153, and 181, and also Part III of the Constitution as specially protected; any public questioning of these provisions could now be criminalised by Parliament (this was done separately at the same time in amendments to the Sedition Act). The provisions in question covered the social contract (not to be confused with the philosophy of a social contract between the government and the governed), a quid pro quo agreement between the Bumiputra and the non-Bumiputra. In return for the granting of citizenship to the non-Bumiputra, the Bumiputra were guaranteed special rights (or as some claim, Malay supremacy — ketuanan Melayu). The amendments thus effectively "entrenched" the social contract, making the contract alterable only with the agreement of the Conference of Rulers. Some have subsequently described the Conference of Rulers as a symbol of "Malay dominance".

The provisions covered were (respectively) those relating to Malay as the national language, the special privileges and rights of the Malays and other indigenous peoples (Bumiputra, constituting more than half the Malaysian population), the status of the Malay rulers, and the provisions for Malaysian citizenship. These restrictions applied to all Malaysians, including members of parliament, over-ruling their parliamentary immunity. In addition, Article 159(5), which governed amendments to the Constitution, was also amended to require the provisions of the Constitution relating to the "sensitive issues" mentioned earlier be amended only with the consent of the Conference of Rulers. This regulation would also apply to Article 159(5).

These changes met with strong opposition from the Democratic Action Party (DAP) and People's Progressive Party (PPP), both of which had called for changes in government policies related to those "sensitive issues" mentioned during their campaigns in the 1969 general election. The changes were criticised as undermining parliamentary supremacy, and some considered the legislation to insufficiently clarify the bans on discussion; in particular, it was questioned if the ban on discussion applied to Article 159(5) as well.

Others, such as The Times of London in the United Kingdom, lambasted the constitutional amendments, stating they would "preserve as immutable the feudal system dominating Malay society" by "giving this archaic body of petty constitutional monarchs incredible blocking power", suggesting that this move was hypocritical in light of Prime Minister Abdul Razak Hussein's declaration of "the full realization that important matters must no longer be swept under the carpet..." Nevertheless, despite fierce opposition, the Alliance coalition government passed the constitutional amendments in Parliament without the opposition votes because of its two-thirds Parliamentary majority.

== Meetings ==
The Conference of Rulers generally meets three times a year. Should the Yang di-Pertuan Agong or at least three members of the Conference request it, however, the Keeper of the Rulers' Seal may convene a meeting of the Conference of Rulers. Meetings will also be convened no later than four weeks before the end of the five-year reign of the Yang di-Pertuan Agong, or whenever there is a vacancy in either their seat or that of their deputy.

The Conference generally meets at the Istana Negara (National Palace), but meetings may be held at other venues should the members of the Conference consent. Meetings have been held on occasion at various state palaces, a State Assembly, and at hotel resorts.

Each Malay ruler generally takes turns chairing each meeting. The agenda is generally outlined and made known to the Rulers prior to the meeting. During the meeting, none of the Malay Rulers take precedence above another and all are considered equal. Even the Yang di-Pertuan Agong has no precedence above the Malay Rulers and serves to represent the federal government. However, a Ruler who has been on the throne for a longer period of time is considered more senior and their advice is widely respected due to the wealth of their experience, but this advice does not have to be followed.

The Secretary of the Conference is the Keeper of the Rulers' Seal.

== Scholarship ==
=== History ===
The Conference of Rulers Scholarship (Malay: Kumpulan Wang Biasiswa Raja-Raja) was established on 31 August 1949 by the 8th Meeting of the Conference of Rulers. Accordingly, the Conference of Rulers Scholarship Fund Regulations were established. The meeting of trustees of the Conference of Rulers Scholarship Fund was changed to the "Ruler and Governor Scholarship Fund" (Malay: Kumpulan Wang Biasiswa Raja-Raja dan Gabenor-Gabenor).

On 12 May 1983, an Act of Act 284 was gazetted and named "Raja-Raja and the Yang di-Pertua-Yang di-Pertua Negeri Higher Studies Scholarship Fund" (Malay: Kumpulan Wang Biasiswa Pengajian Tinggi Raja-Raja Dan Yang di-Pertua-Yang di-Pertua Negeri). Its control and management are placed under the Keeper of the Rulers' Seal who is also secretary of the Fund's Board.

The Board of the Scholarship Fund in accordance with section 5 (1) of Act 284 consists of a chairman and four members appointed by the Conference of Rules between the Menteri Besar and the Chief Minister for a period of two years and is eligible for a reappointment. The Chairman chairs all Board Meetings and meet at least three times a year and at any meeting of the Board, the chairman and two members shall be quorum. The Keeper of the Rulers' Seal is the secretary of the Board.

In 2019, The Board of the Scholarship Fund consists of:

1.	YAB Premier of Sarawak	Chairman
2.	YAB Menteri Besar of Perak	Member
3.	YAB Menteri Besar of Kedah	Member
4.	YAB Menteri Besar of Johor	Member
5.	YAB Chief Minister of Sabah	Member

The main function of the establishment of the Board of the Scholarship Fund is to provide scholarships, financial assistance and other assistance to students who are studying at Public Higher Education Institutions to take on the first degree only. The number of students who have been offered scholarships are limited to the fund capacity of the time This scholarship is offered to students who have excellent results in the Malaysian Higher School Certificate (SPM) / Matriculation examinations only. Candidates to be offered are in various fields of study such as medicine, technology, science and arts. All candidates are received from the Public Service Department (PSD).

=== Scholarship Awards and Recipients ===
The scholarship was first introduced in 1967 initially to three students and the value of scholarship is according to the rate of Public Service Department's scholarship with an extra of RM200 for each student. The total number of students offered the scholarship from 1967 to 2013 was 415.

== Royal Education Award ==
The 145th Conference of the Rulers (2nd Day) on 6 November 1988, agreed to create a Royal Education Award (Malay: Anugerah Pelajaran DiRaja), also called Pingat Jaya Cemerlang. It is one of the oldest and most prestigious awards for any graduate or scholar achievable in Malaysia. The purpose of the award is to give the highest recognition to a graduate whose quality and academic achievement are the best and meet the following criteria:

- Significant development and contribution to country's progress and development
- High intellectual prowess
- Overall exam results
- Co-curriculum activities
- Other prizes obtained
- Certificate and report from the relevant Dean of the Faculty
- Good behavior

The Pingat Jaya Cemerlang was first introduced in 1989 for seven Public Institutions of Higher Learning (IPTA) of two graduates for every IPTA comprising a Bumiputera and a non-Bumiputera recipient of the award is eligible to receive:

- A gold medal worth RM 1,000
- Cash for the amount RM 1,000
- A certificate

The cash payment rate has been raised to RM 2,500 per person from 1995 and RM 5,000 per person from 2009. In 2018, the prize was raised to RM7,000. A total of 19 IPTAs and two graduates for each IPTA have received this award. A total of 567 graduates have received this award.

As of 2016, there are less than 600 recipients of award, fewer than the Tan Sri title, which had 886 recipients as of 2015.

== Yang di-Pertuan Agong Scholarship ==
In 2006, the Public Service Department (PSD) implemented a programme called the Yang di-Pertuan Agong Scholarship (Malay: Biasiswa Yang di-Pertuan Agong) or the King Scholarship, following the decision of the Prime Minister on 3 November 2004, which was approved by the Conference of Rulers meeting on 16 March 2005.

This scholarship was introduced to recognize the exceptional skills of candidates wishing to pursue their postgraduate studies (Master's and PhD), particularly in the field of science and technology, either locally or abroad.

The inaugural award presentation ceremony of the Yang di-Pertuan Agong Scholarship to five candidates for the Master's and Doctoral programmes respectively was held on 29 September 2006. It was officiated by the Yang di-Pertuan Agong at the National Palace. The recipients were also introduced to the Malay rulers, the Yang di-Pertua Negeri and the Prime Minister in a special ceremony prior to the banquet in honour of the Conference of Rulers meeting at the National Palace.

== See also ==
- Yang di-Pertuan Agong
- Regalia of Malaysia
- Monarchies of Malaysia
