= Prime Minister's Department (Malaysia) =

Government ministry in Malaysia

- Jabatan Perdana Menteri (JPM)
- Coat of arms of Malaysia

Ministry overview
- Formed: July 1957; 69 years ago
- Jurisdiction: Government of Malaysia
- Headquarters: Perdana Putra, Federal Government Administrative Centre, 62502 Putrajaya
- Employees: 41,385 (2022)
- Annual budget: MYR 13,893,830,400 (2026)
- Ministers responsible: Azalina Othman Said, Law and Institutional Reforms; Zulkifli Hassan, Religious Affairs; Hannah Yeoh, Federal Territories; Ahmad Zahid Hamidi, Minister in-charge of National Disaster Management Agency; Mustapha Sakmud, Sabah and Sarawak
- Deputy Ministers responsible: M. Kulasegaran, Law and Institutional Reforms; Marhamah Rosli, Religious Affairs; Lo Su Fui, Federal Territories
- Ministry executive: Shamsul Azri Abu Bakar, Chief Secretary to the Government
- Website: www.jpm.gov.my

The Prime Minister's Department (Malay: Jabatan Perdana Menteri; Jawi: جابتن ڤردان منتري; officially abbreviated as JPM) is a federal government ministry in Malaysia. Its objective is "determining the services of all divisions are implemented according to policy, legislation / regulations and current guidelines". It is headed by the Prime Minister of Malaysia followed by other Minister in the Prime Minister's Department. The department consists of the Prime Minister's Office, the Deputy Prime Minister's Office and more than 50 other government agencies and entities. The Prime Minister's Department was established in July 1957. Its headquarters are in Perdana Putra, Putrajaya.

== Structure ==
Formerly known as the General Administration, Prime Minister's Department. The department was organized into:

- Innovation and Human Resource Management Division
- Finance Division
- Development Division
- Accounts Division
- Management Services Division
- Internal Audit Division
- Corporate Communications Unit
- Events Management Division
- Legal Advisor Office

All nine divisions report to the Senior Deputy Secretary-General, assisted by two Deputy Secretaries-General:

- Deputy Secretary-General (Financial and Development)
- Deputy Secretary-General (Management)

== Organisation ==
- Prime Minister of Malaysia
  - Minister in the Prime Minister's Department
    - Deputy Minister in the Prime Minister's Department
      - Chief Secretary to the Government
        - Senior Deputy Secretary-General
          - Under the Authority of Senior Deputy Secretary-General
            - Legal Advisor's Office
            - Internal Audit Division
            - 1Malaysia Civil Servants Housing Unit
            - Corporate Communication Unit
            - Integrity Unit
          - Deputy Secretary-General (Financial and Development)
            - Project Development Division
            - Account Division
            - Finance Division
          - Deputy Secretary-General (Management)
            - Innovation and Human Resources Management Division
            - Management Services Division
            - Event Management Division

List of departments and agencies, statutory bodies, companies, foundations, committee, under Prime Minister's Department.

(As of 29 January 2019)

=== Departments and Agencies (51) ===
1. Prime Minister's Office of Malaysia (PMO), or Pejabat Perdana Menteri Malaysia (PPM). (Official site)
2. Malaysia Civil Defence Force, or Angkatan Pertahanan Awam Malaysia (APM). (Official site)
3. National Disaster Management Agency (NADMA), or Agensi Pengurusan Bencana Negara (APBN). (Official site)
4. Sabah and Sarawak Affairs Division, or Bahagian Hal Ehwal Sabah dan Sarawak.
5. Legal Affairs Division, or Bahagian Hal Ehwal Undang-Undang (BHEUU). (Official site)
  1. Legal Aid Department, or Jabatan Bantuan Guaman (JBG). (Official site)
  2. Malaysia Department of Insolvency (MdI), or Jabatan Insolvensi Malaysia. (Official site)
6. Ceremonial and International Conference Secretariat Division, or Bahagian Istiadat dan Urusetia Persidangan Antarabangsa (BIUPA). (Official site)
7. Cabinet, Constitution and Inter-Government Relation Division, or Bahagian Kabinet, Perlembagaan dan Perhubungan Antara Kerajaan (BKPP). (Official site)
8. Property and Land Management Division, or Bahagian Pengurusan Hartanah (BPH). (Official site)
9. Research Division, or Bahagian Penyelidikan.
10. Protection Division, or Bahagian Perlindungan (UPS). (Official site)
11. Judicial and Legal Training Institute, or Institut Latihan Kehakiman dan Perundangan (ILKAP). (Official site)
12. National Palace, or Istana Negara. (Official site)
13. Department of Federal Territory Islamic Affairs, or Jabatan Agama Wilayah Persekutuan (JAWI). (Official site)
14. National Audit Department, or Jabatan Audit Negara. (Official site)
15. Syariah Judiciary Department Malaysia, or Jabatan Kehakiman Syariah Malaysia (JKSM). (Official site)
  1. Sabah Syariah Judiciary Department Malaysia, or Jabatan Kehakiman Syariah Malaysia Negeri Sabah
16. Department of Islamic Development Malaysia, or Jabatan Kemajuan Islam Malaysia (JAKIM). (Official site)
  1. Department of Awqaf, Zakat and Haji, or Jabatan Wakaf, Zakat dan Haji (JAWHAR). (Official site)
  2. Islamic Dakwah Foundation of Malaysia, or Yayasan Dakwah Islamiah Malaysia (YADIM). (Official site)
  3. Malaysian Islamic Economic Development Foundation, or Yayasan Pembangunan Ekonomi Islam (YaPEIM). (Official site)
  4. Malaysian Awqaf Foundation, or Yayasan Waqaf Malaysia (YWM). (Official site)
  5. Alhijrah Media Corporation, or Perbadanan Media Alhijrah. (Official site)
  6. Institute of Islamic Understanding Malaysia, or Institiut Kefahaman Islam Malaysia (IKIM). (Official site)
17. Department of Orang Asli Development or Jabatan Kemajuan Orang Asli (JAKOA). (Official site)
18. Attorney General's Chambers (AGC), or Jabatan Peguam Negara. (Official site)
19. Department of Federal Territory Syariah Prosecution, orJabatan Pendakwaan Syariah Wilayah Persekutuan
20. Public Service Department (PSD), or Jabatan Perkhidmatan Awam Malaysia (JPA). (Official site)
21. Department of National Unity and Integration, or Jabatan Perpaduan Negara dan Integrasi Nasional (JPNIN). (Official site)
22. Advisory Board, or Lembaga Penasihat (LP). (Official site)
23. Federal Territory Syariah Court, or Mahkamah Syariah Wilayah Persekutuan (MSWP). (Official site)
24. National Security Council, or Majlis Keselamatan Negara (MKN). (Official site)
25. Parliament of Malaysia, or Parlimen Malaysia. (Official site)
26. Malaysia Office of the Chief Government Security Officer (CGSO), or Pejabat Ketua Pegawai Keselamatan Kerajaan Malaysia (KPKK). (Official site)
27. Office of the Chief Registrar Federal Court of Malaysia, or Pejabat Ketua Pendaftar Mahkamah Persekutuan Malaysia. (Official site)
28. Federal Territory Mufti's Office, or Pejabat Mufti Wilayah Persekutuan. (Official site)
29. Office of the Keeper of the Rulers' Seal of the Conference of Rulers', or Pejabat Penyimpan Mohor Besar Raja-Raja Malaysia. (Official site)
30. Office of the Former Prime Minister Secretariat Office, or Pejabat Urusetia Bekas Perdana Menteri Malaysia.
  1. Secretariat Office of Tun Dr. Mahathir Mohamad, or Pejabat Urusetia YAB Tun Dr. Mahathir Mohamad.
  2. Secretariat Office of Dato' Sri Mohd Najib bin Tun Abdul Razak, or Pejabat Urusetia YB Dato' Sri Mohd Najib bin Tun Abdul Razak
  3. Secretariat Office of Tan Sri Dato' Haji Muhyiddin bin Mohd Yassin, or Pejabat Urusetia YB Tan Sri Dato' Haji Muhyiddin bin Mohd Yassin
  4. Secretariat Office of Dato' Sri Ismail Sabri bin Yaakob, or Pejabat Urusetia YB Dato' Sri Ismail Sabri bin Yaakob
31. National Governance, Integrity and Anti-Corruption Center, or Pusat Governans, Integriti dan Anti-Rasuah Nasional (GIACC). (Official site)
  1. Public Complaints Bureau (PCB), or Biro Pengaduan Awam (BPA). (Official site)
  2. Enforcement Agency Integrity Commission (EAIC), or Suruhanjaya Integriti Agensi Penguatkuasaan (SIAP). (Official site)
  3. The Malaysian Institute of Integrity, or Institut Integriti Malaysia (IIM). (Official site)
32. Asian International Arbitration Centre (AIAC), or Pusat Timbang Tara Asia Serantau. (Official site)
33. Malaysian Administrative Modernisation and Management Planning Unit (MAMPU), or Unit Pemodenan Tadbiran dan Perancangan Pengurusan Malaysia. (Official site)
34. Implementation Coordination Unit (ICU), or Unit Penyelarasan Pelaksanaan. (Official site)
35. Federal Territories Land Executive Committee Secretariat, or Urusetia Jawatankuasa Kerja Tanah Wilayah Persekutuan (UJKT). (Official site)
36. Malaysian Indian Society Transformation Unit, or Unit Transformasi Masyarakat India Malaysia (MITRA).

=== Statutory Bodies (13) ===
1. Pilgrimage Fund Board, or Lembaga Tabung Haji (LTH). (Official site)
2. Federal Territory Islamic Religious Council, or Majlis Agama Islam Wilayah Persekutuan (MAIWP). (Official site)
3. Judicial Appointments Commission (JAC), or Suruhanjaya Perlantikan Kehakiman (SPK). (Official site)
4. Election Commission of Malaysia (EC), or Suruhanjaya Pilihan Raya Malaysia (SPR). (Official site)
5. Malaysian Anti-Corruption Commission (MACC), or Suruhanjaya Pencegahan Rasuah Malaysia (SPRM). (Official site)
6. Public Services Commission of Malaysia (PSC), or Suruhanjaya Perkhidmatan Awam Malaysia (SPA). (Official site)
7. Education Service Commission Malaysia (ESC), or Suruhanjaya Perkhidmatan Pelajaran Malaysia (SPP). (Official site)
8. Judicial and Legal Service Commission Malaysia, or Suruhanjaya Perkhidmatan Kehakiman dan Perundangan
9. Human Rights Commission of Malaysia (HRC), or Suruhanjaya Hak Asasi Manusia Malaysia (SUHAKAM). (Official site)
10. Raja-Raja and the Yang di-Pertua-Yang di-Pertua Negeri Higher Studies Scholarship Fund Board, or Kumpulan Wang Biasiswa Pengajian Tinggi Raja-Raja dan Yang di-Pertua Yang di-Pertua Negeri. (Official site)
11. Department of Security & Administration (Lembaga Pembangunan dan Keselamatan Negara). Y.Bhg Dr. Zainuddin B. Arshad (Ekonomi), Y.Bhg Ir. Dr. Abdul Rahman B. Mahmud (Pentadbiran Sumber Asli & Galian), Y.Bhg Prof. Dr. Tan Fah Kui (Perdagangan Antarabangsa), Y.Bhg Tan Sri Vincent Tan Chee Yioun (Pembangunan). (site)
12. Langkawi Development Authority, or Lembaga Pembangunan Langkawi (LADA). (Official site)
13. Hindu Endowments Board State Pulau Penang, or Lembaga Wakaf Hindu Negeri Pulau Pinang

=== Under the Companies Act (7) ===
1. Khazanah Nasional Berhad (Khazanah) (Official site)
2. Malaysian Industry-Government Group for High Technology (MiGHT). (Official site)
3. Petroliam Nasional Berhad (PETRONAS). (Official site)
4. Permodalan Nasional Berhad (PNB). (Official site), a subsidiary of the Bumiputra Investment Foundation or Yayasan Pelaburan Bumiputra
5. Perbadanan Nasional Berhad (PNS). (Official site)
6. Perbadanan Usahawan Nasional Berhad (PUNB). (Official site)

=== Foundations (1) ===
1. National Legal Aid Foundation, or Yayasan Bantuan Guaman Kebangsaan (YBGK).

=== Committee (2) ===
1. Governance, Government Procurement and Finance Committee, or Jawatankuasa Siasatan Tadbir Urus, Perolehan dan Kewangan Kerajaan
2. Secretariat of Special Committee for Review of Law and Election Travel Affairs, or Sekretariat Jawatankuasa Khas Untuk Menyemak Semula Undang-undang dan Urusan Perjalanan Pilihan Raya

== Ministers ==
Minister	Portrait	Office	Executive Experience
Azalina Othman Said		Minister in the Prime Minister's Department (Law and Institutional Reform)	MP for Pengerang (March 2024 – current); Minister of Youth and Sports (March 2004 – March 2008); Minister of Tourism (March 2008 – April 2009); Minister in the Prime Minister's Department (July 2015 – May 2018; December 2022 – current); Chairperson of the National Film Development Corporation Malaysia (May 2015 – July 2015); Deputy Speaker of the Dewan Rakyat (July 2020 – August 2021)
Zulkifli Hasan		Minister in the Prime Minister's Department (Religious Affairs)	Senator (December 2023 – current); Deputy Minister in the Prime Minister's Department (December 2023 – December 2025)
Mustapha Sakmud		Minister in the Prime Minister's Department (Sabah & Sarawak Affairs)	MP for Sepanggar (November 2022 – current); Deputy Minister of Human Resources (December 2022 – December 2023); Deputy Minister of Higher Education (December 2023 – December 2025)
Hannah Yeoh Tseow Suan		Minister in the Prime Minister's Department (Federal Territories Affairs)	MLA for Subang Jaya (March 2008 – May 2018); Speaker of the Selangor State Legislative Assembly (June 2013 – April 2018); MP for Segambut (May 2018 – current); Deputy Minister of Women, Family and Community Development (July 2018 – February 2020); Minister of Youth and Sports (December 2023 – December 2025)
Ahmad Zahid Hamidi		Minister Responsible for National Disaster Management Agency	MP for Bagan Datuk (April 1995 – current); Deputy Minister of Tourism (March 2004 – February 2006); Deputy Minister of Information (February 2006 – March 2008); Minister in the Prime Minister's Department (March 2008 – April 2009); Minister of Defence (April 2009 – May 2013); Minister of Home Affairs (May 2013 – May 2018); Deputy Prime Minister (July 2015 – May 2018; December 2022 – current); Leader of the Opposition (July 2018 – March 2019); Minister of Rural and Regional Development (December 2022 – current)
Kulasegaran Murugeson		Deputy Minister in the Prime Minister's Department (Law and Institutional Reform)	MP for Telok Intan (May 1997– November 1999); MP for Ipoh Barat (March 2004 – current); Minister of Human Resources (May 2018 – February 2020)
Marhamah Rosli		Deputy Minister in the Prime Minister's Department (Religious Affairs)	Senator (December 2025 – current)
Lo Su Fui		Deputy Minister in the Prime Minister's Department (Federal Territories Affairs)	Special Officer in the Office of the Chinese Affairs of the Chief Minister of Sabah (January 2021 – October 2022); MP for Tawau (November 2022 – current)

== See also ==
- Minister in the Prime Minister's Department
