= List of federal ministries and agencies in Malaysia =

This is a list of agencies of Malaysian federal government. The list includes statutory bodies (ticked with *) government-linked companies and organisations (ticked with **).

== Federal ministries ==
The current Cabinet, formed on 2 December 2023, comprised the following federal ministries:

- Prime Minister's Department (JPM)
- Ministry of Agriculture and Food Security (KPKM)
- Ministry of Communications
- Ministry of Defence (MINDEF)
- Ministry of Digital
- Ministry of Domestic Trade and Cost of Living (KPDN)
- Ministry of Economy
- Ministry of Education (KPM)
- Ministry of Energy Transition and Water Transformation (PETRA)
- Ministry of Entrepreneurship and Cooperatives Development (KUSKOP)
- Ministry of Finance (MOF)
- Ministry of Foreign Affairs (Wisma Putra)
- Ministry of Health (KKM)
- Ministry of Higher Education (KPT)
- Ministry of Home Affairs (KDN)
- Ministry of Housing and Local Government (KPKT)
- Ministry of Human Resources (KESUMA)
- Ministry of Investment, Trade and Industry (MITI)
- Ministry of National Unity (KPN)
- Ministry of Natural Resources and Environmental Sustainability (NRES)
- Ministry of Plantation and Commodities (KPK/MPC)
- Ministry of Rural and Regional Development (KKDW)
- Ministry of Science, Technology and Innovation (MOSTI)
- Ministry of Tourism, Arts and Culture (MOTAC)
- Ministry of Transport (MOT)
- Ministry of Women, Family and Community Development (KPWKM)
- Ministry of Works (KKR)
- Ministry of Youth and Sports (KBS)

== Federal agencies ==
=== Prime Minister's Department ===
Prime Minister's Department, having status of a ministry, comprises the following agencies:

No	Department/Agency	Related Agencies
1	Advisory Board	
2	Amanah Raya Berhad	
3	Asian International Arbitration Centre	
4	Attorney General's Chamber	
5	Bumiputera Investment Foundation	
6	Cabinet, Constitution and Intergovernmental Affairs Division	
7	Chief Secretary's Office	
8	Deputy Prime Ministers' Offices	
9	Division of Ceremonies and International Conferences Secretariat (BIUPA)	
10	Education Service Commission (SPP)	
11	Election Commission (SPR)	
12	Enforcement Agency Integrity Commission (EAIC)	
13	Federal Land Development Authority	FGV Holdings Berhad
15	Federal Territories Department	Federal Territories' Sports Council (MSWP); Labuan Corporation; Kampong Bharu Development Corporation (PKB); Kuala Lumpur City Hall; Office of the Director of Land and Mines of Federal Territories; Putrajaya Corporation
16	Federal Territories’ Islamic Affairs Council	
17	Federal Territories' Syariah Court (MSWP)	
18	Federal Territories Syariah Prosecution Department (JAPENSWP)	
19	FELDA Regulatory Division (BKSF)	
20	Former Prime Ministers' Secretariat Office	Office of Former Prime Minister Mahathir Mohamad (PM4); Office of Former Prime Minister Abdullah Ahmad Badawi (PM5); Office of Former Prime Minister Najib Razak (PM6); Office of Former Prime Minister Muhyiddin Yassin (PM8); Office of Former Prime Minister Ismail Sabri Yaakob (PM9)
21	General Administration	
22	Human Rights Commission of Malaysia	
23	Implementation Coordination Unit	
24	Institute for Strategic and International Studies	
25	Judicial Appointments Commission	
26	Labuan Native Court	
27	Legal Affairs Division (BHEUU)	Legal Aid Department (JBG); Malaysian Department of Insolvencies (MdI)
28	Legal and Judicial Services Commission (SPKP)	
29	Legal and Judicial Training Institute (ILKAP)	
30	Malaysian Anti-Corruption Commission	
31	Malaysian Civic Academy (AKM)	
32	Malaysian Civil Defence Force	
33	Malaysian Civil Servant Housing Unit (PPAM)	
34	Malaysian Family Foundation (YKM)	
35	Malaysian Integrity Institute (INTEGRITI)	
36	Malaysian Islamic Development Department (JAKIM)	Alhijrah Media Corporation (TV Alhijrah); Department of Waqf, Zakat and Hajj (JAWHAR); Federal Territories' Islamic Affairs Department (JAWI); Islamic Dakwah Foundation of Malaysia (YADIM); Islamic Economic Development Foundation of Malaysia (YaPEIM); Waqaf Foundation of Malaysia (YWM)
37	Malaysian Islamic Understanding Institute (IKIM)	
38	Malaysian Maritime Enforcement Affairs Division (BHEPMM)	
39	Malaysian Syariah Judiciary Department (JKSM)	Sabah State Syariah Judiciary Department (JKSN Sabah)
40	National Anti-Financial Crime Centre (NFCC)	
41	National Audit Department (JAN)	
42	National Disaster Management Agency (NADMA)	
43	National Legal Aid Foundation (YBGK)	
44	National Palace	
45	National Security Council (MKN)	National Cyber Security Agency (NACSA)
46	Office of Sabah Federal Secretary (PSUP Sabah)	
47	Office of Sarawak Federal Secretary (PSUP Sarawak)	
48	Office of the Chief Administrator of the Parliament	
49	Office of the Chief Government Security Officer (CGSO)	
50	Office of the Chief Registrar of the Federal Court (PKPMP)	
51	Office of the Keeper of the Rulers’ Seal (PMBRR)	
52	Office of the Mufti of Federal Territories (PMWP)	
53	Pelaburan Hartanah Berhad (PHB)	
54	Perbadanan Usahawan Nasional Berhad (PUNB)	
55	Performance Acceleration Coordination Unit (PADU)	
56	Permodalan Nasional Berhad (PNB)	
57	Petroliam Nasional Berhad	
58	Pilgrims Fund Board	
59	Prime Minister's Office	
60	Property Management Division (BPH)	
61	Protection Division	
62	Public Complaints Bureau (BPA/PCB)	
63	Public-Private Partnership Unit (UKAS)	
64	Public Services Commission (SPA)	
65	Public Service Department	Malaysian Institute of Public Administration
66	Research Division	
67	Rulers’ and Governors’ Higher Education Scholarship Fund	
68	Sabah and Sarawak Affairs Division (BHESS)	
69	Secretariat of Federal Territories Land Work Committee (UJKTWP)	
70	Shared Prosperity Delivery Unit (SEPADU)	

=== Ministry of Agriculture and Food Security ===
This Ministry comprises the following agencies:

- Agrobank (Website)**
- Department of Agriculture (DOA)
- Department of Fisheries (DOF)
- Department of Veterinary Service (DVS)
- Farmers’ Organisation Authority* (LPP) (Website)
- Federal Agricultural Marketing Authority* (FAMA) (Website)
- Kemubu Agricultural Development Authority* (KADA)
- Malaysian Agricultural Research and Development Institute** (MARDI) (Website)
- Malaysian Fisheries Development Authority* (LKIM)
- Malaysian Pineapple Industrial Authority* (LPNM)
- Malaysian Quarantine and Inspection Services (MAQIS)
- Muda Agricultural Development Authority* (MADA)

=== Ministry of Communications ===
This Ministry comprises the following agencies:

- Community Communications Department (J-KOM) (Website)
- Department of Broadcasting (RTM) (Website)
- Department of Information (JAPEN)
- Malaysian Communication and Multimedia Commission* (SKMM) (Website)
- Malaysian National Film Development Corporation* (FINAS)
- Malaysian National News Agency* (BERNAMA) (Website)
- MyCreative Ventures**
- Tun Abdul Razak Institute for Broadcasting and Information (IPPTAR)

=== Ministry of Defence ===
This Ministry comprises the following agencies:

- Armed Forces Retirees' Affairs Corporation* (PERHEBAT)
- ATM Veteran Affairs Department (JHEV)
- Malaysian Armed Forces (ATM) (Website)
- Malaysian Institute of Defence and Security (MIDAS)
- Science and Technology Research Institute for Defence (STRIDE)

=== Ministry of Digital ===
The Ministry comprises the following agencies:

- CyberSecurity Malaysia**
- Digital Nasional Berhad (DNB)
- Department of Personal Data Protection (JPDP)
- Malaysian Digital Economy Corporation** (MDEC)
- National Digital Department (JDN)
- myNIC Berhad** (Website)
- MyDiGITAL Corporation (MyDIGITAL)

=== Ministry of Domestic Trade and Cost of Living ===
This Ministry comprises the following agencies:

- Companies Commission (SSM) (Website)
- Competition Commission (MyCC)
- Malaysian Intellectual Property Corporation (MyIPO)

=== Ministry of Economy ===
This Ministry comprises the following agencies:

- Bumiputera Agenda Leader Unit** (TERAJU) (Website)
- Department of Statistics (DOSM)
- East Coast Economic Region Development Council* (ECERDC)
- EKUINAS Foundation**
- Ekuiti Nasional Berhad** (EKUINAS)
- Iskandar Region Development Authority* (IRDA) (Website)
- Johor Corporation (JCORP)
- Johor Petroleum Development Corporation** (JPDC)
- Kedah State Development Corporation (PKNK)
- Kelantan State Economic Development Corporation (PKINK)
- Malaysia Petroleum Resources Corporation** (MPRC)
- Melaka Corporation (MCORP)
- Negeri Sembilan State Development Corporation (PKNNS)
- Northern Corridor Implementation Authority* (NCIA)
- Pahang State Development Corporation (PKNP, Pahang)
- Penang Development Corporation (PDC)
- Peneraju Foundation**
- Perak State Development Corporation (PKNP, Perak)
- Perlis State Economic Development Corporation (PKENPs)
- Regional Corridor Development Authority* (RECODA)
- Sabah Economic Development Corporation (SEDCO)
- Sabah Economic Development and Investment Authority* (SEDIA)
- Sarawak Economic Development Corporation (SEDC)
- Selangor State Development Corporation (PKNS)
- Terengganu State Economic Development Corporation (PMINT)

=== Ministry of Education ===
This Ministry comprises the following agencies:

- Dewan Bahasa dan Pustaka* (DBP) (Website)
- Malaysian Examination Council* (MPM)
- Malaysian Institute of Translation & Books** (ITBM)
- Kota Buku Corporation**

=== Ministry of Energy Transition and Water Transformation ===
This Ministry comprises the following agencies:

- Department of Irrigation and Drainage (JPS/DID)
- Department of Water Supply (JBA/BBA)
- Energy Commission* (ST) (Website)
- Indah Water Consortium** (IWK)
- Malaysian Sustainable Energy Development Authority (SEDA)
- MyPower Corporation**
- National Hydraulic Research Institute of Malaysia (NAHRIM)
- National Water Services Commission* (SPAN)
- Pengurusan Aset Air Berhad** (PAAB)
- Sewerage Services Department (JPP)

=== Ministry of Entrepreneurship and Cooperatives Development ===
This Ministry comprises the following agencies:

- Amanah Ikhtiar Malaysia** (AIM)
- Bank Kerjasama Rakyat Malaysia Berhad** (Bank Rakyat)
- Cooperatives Commission (SKM)
- Malaysian Entrepreneurship and Cooperative University** (UKKM)
- National Entrepreneurship Institute** (INSKEN)
- Perbadanan Nasional Berhad** (PERNAS)
- Small and Medium Enterprise Corporation* (SME Corp. Malaysia)
- Small and Medium Entreprise Bank** (SME Bank)
- TEKUN Nasional**
- UDA Holdings Berhad

=== Ministry of Finance ===
This Ministry, including the Treasury, comprises the following agencies:

- Accountant-General's Department (ANM)
- Bank Simpanan Nasional* (BSN) (Website)
- Bursa Malaysia Berhad** (Website)
- Central Bank of Malaysia* (BNM) (Website)
- Employees’ Provident Fund* (KWSP/EPF) (Website)
- Inland Revenue Board* (LHDN)
- Labuan Financial Services Authority* (Labuan FSA)
- Langkawi Development Authority* (LADA)
- Malaysian Deposit Insurance Corporation (PIDM)
- Malaysian Totalisator Board*
- Public Sector Housing Financing Authority* (LPPSA)
- Retirement Fund, Incorporated* (KWAP) (Website)
- Royal Malaysian Customs Department (JKDM) (Website)
- Securities Commission* (SC)
- Valuation and Property Services Department (JPPH)

=== Ministry of Foreign Affairs ===
This Ministry comprises the following agencies and includes Malaysian foreign missions abroad:

- Institute of Diplomacy and Foreign Relations (IDFR)
- National Authority for Chemical Weapons' Convention (NACWC)
- Southeast Asia Regional Centre for Counter Terrorism (SEARCCT)

=== Ministry of Health ===
This Ministry comprises the following agencies and includes government hospitals, health centres, clinics and training centres:

- Clinical Research Malaysia (CRM)
- Medical Device Authority (MDA)
- Malaysian Healthcare Travel Council (MHTC)
- Malaysian Medical Council (MMC)
- ProtectHealth Corporation

=== Ministry of Higher Education ===
This Ministry with comprises the following agencies and includes educational institutions:

- Education Malaysia Global Services (EMGS)
- Higher Education Department (JPT)
- Higher Education Leadership Academy (AKEPT)
- Malaysian Qualification Agency* (MQA)
- National Higher Education Fund Corporation* (PTPTN) (Website)
- Polytechnic and Community College Education Department (JPPKK)

=== Ministry of Home Affairs ===
This Ministry comprises the following agencies:

- Eastern Sabah Security Command (ESSCOM)
- Malaysian Immigration Department (JIM)
- Malaysian Checkpoints and Border Authority (MCBA)
- Malaysian Maritime Enforcement Agency (APMM) (Website)
- Malaysian Prison Department (Website)
- Malaysian Volunteers’ Department (RELA) (Website)
- National Anti-Drug Agency (AADK)
- National Registration Department (JPN)
- Registry of Societies (ROS)
- Royal Malaysian Police (PDRM) (Website)

=== Ministry of Housing and Local Government ===
This Ministry comprises the following agencies:

- Department of Local Governments (JKT)
- Department of Urban and Rural Planning (PLANMalaysia)
- Fire and Rescue Department of Malaysia (JBPM) (Website)
- National Landscape Department (JLN)
- National Housing Department (JPN)
- National Solid Waste Management Department (JPSPN)
- Housing and Local Government Training Institute (i-KPKT)
- PR1MA Malaysia Corporation*
- Solid Waste Management and Public Cleansing Corporation* (SWCorp)
- Syarikat Perumahan Negara Berhad** (SPNB)
- Tribunal for Housing and Strata Management (TPPS)
- URBANICE Malaysia**

=== Ministry of Human Resources ===
This Ministry comprises the following agencies:

- Department of Industrial Relations (JPP)
- Department of Labour, Peninsular Malaysia (JTKSM)
- Department of Manpower (JTM)
- Department of Occupational Safety and Health (JKKP)
- Department of Skills Development (JPK) (Website)
- Department of Trade Union Affairs (JHEKS)
- Human Resources Development Corporation** (HRD Corp.)
- Industrial Courts (MP)
- Malaysian Indian Transform Unit (MITRA)
- National Institute of Occupational Safety and Health** (NIOSH)
- Sabah Labour Department (JTK Sabah)
- Sarawak Labour Department (JTK Sarawak)
- Skills Development Fund Corporation (PTPK)
- Social Security Organisation (PERKESO)
- Talent Corporation Malaysia Berhad** (TalentCorp)

=== Ministry of Investment, Trade and Industry ===
This Ministry comprises the following agencies:

- Collaborate Research in Engineering, Science and Technology** (CREST)
- Department of Standards Malaysia
- EXIM Bank**
- Halal Development Corporation** (HDC) (Website)
- Malaysian Automotive Robotics and IoT Institute** (MARii)
- Malaysian Design Council** (MRM)
- Malaysian External Trade Development Corporation (MATRADE)
- Malaysian Industrial Development Finance** (MIDF)
- Malaysian Investment Development Authority (MIDA) (Website)
- Malaysian Productivity Corporation (MPC)
- Malaysian Steel Institute** (MSI)
- National Aerospace Industry Coordinating Office (NAICO)
- National Measurement Council (MPK)
- SIRIM Berhad** (Website)

=== Ministry of National Unity ===
This Ministry comprises the following agencies:

- Department of Museums Malaysia (JMM)
- Department of National Unity and Integration (JPNIN)
- National Archives of Malaysia (Website)
- National Library of Malaysia (PNM) (Website)
- Tun Razak Foundation** (YTR)
- Tunku Abdul Rahman Foundation** (YTAR)
- Student Volunteers' Foundation** (YSS)

=== Ministry of Natural Resources and Environmental Sustainability ===
This Ministry comprises the following agencies:

- Board of Geologists Malaysia*
- Board of Surveyors Malaysia*
- Department of Biosafety (JBK)
- Department of Environment (JAS)
- Department of Forestry of Peninsular Malaysia (JPSM)
- Department of Mineral and Geoscience (JMG)
- Department of the Director General of Land and Mines (JKPTG)
- Department of Wildlife and National Parks Peninsular Malaysia (PERHILITAN) (Website)
- Forestry Research Institute of Malaysia* (FRIM)
- Land Surveyors Board
- Malaysia Forest Fund (MFF)
- Malaysia Green Technology and Climate Change Corporation** (MGTC)
- Malaysian Mapping and Survey Department (JUPEM)
- Malaysian Meteorological Department (MET Malaysia) (Website)
- National Land and Survey Institute (INSTUN)
- Sultan Mizan Foundation for Antarctic Research** (YPASM)
- Tin Industry (Research and Development) Board*
- Yayasan Hijau** (YHM)

=== Ministry of Plantation Industries and Commodities ===
This Ministry comprises the following agencies:

- Malaysian Cocoa Board* (LKM)
- Malaysian Palm Oil Board* (MPOB)
- Malaysian Pepper Board* (MPB)
- Malaysian Rubber Board* (LGM)
- Malaysian Timber Industries Board* (MTIB)
- National Kenaf and Tobacco Board* (LKTN)
- Malaysian Palm Oil Certification Council** (MPOCC)
- Malaysian Palm Oil Council** (MPOC)
- Malaysian Rubber Council** (MREPC)
- Malaysian Timber Certification Council** (MTCC)
- Malaysian Timber Council** (MTC)
- Institute of Malaysian Plantation and Commodities (IMPAC) (Website)
- Malaysian Palm Oil Green Conservation Foundation (MPOGCF)
- LGM Properties Cooperation (LGMPC)
- Forest Plantation Development Sdn. Bhd (FPD)

=== Ministry of Rural and Regional Development ===
This Ministry comprises the following agencies:

- Community Development Department (KEMAS)
- Indigenous Community Affairs Department (JAKOA)
- Central Terengganu Development Authority* (KETENGAH)
- Kedah Regional Development Authority* (KEDA)
- Majlis Amanah Rakyat* (MARA) (Website)
- Penang Regional Development Authority* (PERDA)
- Rubber Industry Smallholders Development Authority* (RISDA) (Website)
- South Kelantan Development Authority* (KESEDAR)
- Southeast Johor Development Authority* (KEJORA)
- Federal Land Combination and Recovery Authority** (FELCRA)

=== Ministry of Science, Technology and Innovation ===
This Ministry comprises the following agencies:

- Malaysian Foundation for Innovation** (YIM)
- Malaysian Institute of Chemistry** (IKM)
- Bioeconomy Corporation**
- Kumpulan Modal Perdana Sdn. Bhd. (KMP)
- Malaysia Debt Ventures Berhad** (MDV)
- Malaysia Venture Capital** (MAVCAP)
- Malaysian Technology Development Corporation** (MTDC)
- National Institutes of Biotechnology Malaysia** (NIBM)
- MIMOS Berhad** (Website)
- NanoMalaysia Berhad**
- Malaysian Industry-Government Group for High Technology** (MiGHT) (Website)
- Cradle Fund Sdn. Bhd. (CRADLE)
- Malaysian Research Accelerator for Technology & Innovation (MRANTI)
- Malaysian Nuclear Agency (Nuclear Malaysia)
- Malaysian Space Agency (MYSA)

=== Ministry of Tourism, Arts and Culture ===
This Ministry comprises the following agencies:

- Islamic Tourism Centre (ITC)
- Istana Budaya (IB) (Website)
- Malaysia Convention and Exhibition Bureau (MyCEB)
- Malaysian Handicraft Development Corporation (PKKM)
- National Culture and Art Department (JKKN)
- National Culture, Art and Heritage Academy (ASWARA)
- National Heritage Department (JWN)
- National Visual Arts Development Board (LPSVN)
- Tourism Malaysia* (Website)
- Hotel Seri Malaysia (Website)

=== Ministry of Transport ===
This Ministry comprises the following agencies:

- Bintulu Port Authority (BPA)
- Civil Aviation Authority of Malaysia (CAAM) (Website)
- Johor Port Authority* (LPJ)
- Kuantan Port Authority* (LPKTN)
- Land Public Transport Agency* (APAD) (Website)
- Malaysian Institute of Road Safety Research (MIROS)
- Marine Department of Malaysia (JLM)
- Maritime Institute of Malaysia (MIMA)
- Penang Port Commission* (SPPP/PPC)
- Port Klang Authority* (PKA) (Website)
- Railway Assets Corporation* (PAK/RAC)
- Road Transport Department (JPJ) (Website)
- Perlindungan Dan Indemniti Malaysia Sdn Bhd (P&I Malaysia)
- Sabah Commercial Vehicles Licensing Board (LPKP Sabah)
- Sarawak Commercial Vehicles Licensing Board (LPKP Sarawak)
- Malaysia Aviation Commission (MAVCOM)
- Mass Rapid Transit Corporation Sdn. Bhd. (MRT Corp)
- Malaysia Airport Holding Berhad (MAHB)
- Prasarana Malaysia Berhad (Prasarana)
- Kereta Tanah Api Melayu Berhad (KTMB)
- Malaysia Rail Link Berhad (MRL)
- Kemaman Port Authority
- Malacca Port Authority
- Labuan Port Authority

=== Ministry of Women, Family and Community Development ===
This Ministry comprises the following agencies:

- National Family and Community Development Board* (LPPKN)
- Community Welfare Department (JKM)
- Institute of Social, Malaysia (ISM)
- Women Development Department (JPW)
- Board of Counsellor Malaysia (LKM) (Website)
- National Welfare Foundation (YKN) (Website)

=== Ministry of Works ===
This Ministry comprises the following agencies:

- Public Works Department (JKR)
- Construction Industry Development Board (CIDB)
- Malaysian Highway Board (LLM)
- Board of Engineers of Malaysia (BEM)
- Board of Quantity Surveyors (BQSM)
- Board of Architects, Malaysia (LAM)

=== Ministry of Youth and Sports ===
This Ministry comprises the following agencies and includes the Ministry training institutes:

- Anti-Doping Agency of Malaysia** (ADAMAS)
- Civic and Citizenship Bureau (BTN)
- International Youth Centre** (IYC)
- Malaysian Stadium Corporation* (PSM)
- Institute for Youth Research Malaysia (IYRES)
- National Sports Council (MSN/NSC)
- National Sports Institute (ISN)
- National Youth and Sports Department (JBSN)
- Office of the Sports Commissioner (PPS)
- Registry of Youth Societies (ROY)
- Sepang International Circuit Sdn. Bhd.** (SIC) (Website)
- Subang Golf Course Corporation** (SGCC) (Website)
- Institute for Youth Skills and Sports (ILKBS)
