= Malaysia Federal Route 229 =

Road in Malaysia

Federal Route 229
- Jalan Permatang Badak

Route information
- Length: 2.83 km (1.76 mi)

Major junctions
- North end: FT 3 AH18 Kuantan Bypass junctions

- FT 3 AH18 Kuantan Bypass; FT 2 Gambang-Kuantan Highway
- South end: FT 2 Gambang-Kuantan Highway junctions

Location
- Country: Malaysia
- Primary destinations: Permatang Badak

Highway system
- Highways in Malaysia; Expressways; Federal; State

Jalan Permatang Badak, Federal Route 229 (formerly Pahang State Route C173), is a federal road in Pahang, Malaysia. The Kilometre Zero (KM0) of the Federal Route 229 starts at Gambang-Kuantan Highway junctions.

== Features ==
At most sections, the Federal Route 229 was built under the JKR R5 road standard, allowing maximum speed limit of up to 90 km/h.

== List of junctions ==
Km	Exit	Junctions	To	Remarks
		FT 3 Kuantan Bypass	FT 3 AH18 Kuantan Bypass Northeast; FT 3 AH18 Kuala Terengganu; FT 3 AH18 Chukai (Kemaman); FT 231 Sungai Lembing; East Coast Expressway AH141 East Coast Expressway; Kuala Lumpur; Kuala Terengganu Southwest; FT 2 Gambang; FT 2 Temerloh; FT 420 Sultan Haji Ahmad Shah Airport	T-junctions
		Taman Bukit Rangin	Taman Bukit Rangin; Perkampungan Sungai Isap Damai	T-junctions
		Taman Permatang Badak		
		Kampung Sungai Isap		
		Permatang Badak		
		Taman Sepakat		
FT 229; 0		Gambang-Kuantan Highway	FT 2 Gambang-Kuantan Highway West; FT 2 Gambang; FT 2 Temerloh; FT 3 AH18 Pekan; FT 3 AH18 Johor Bahru East; FT 2 Kuantan town centre FT 183 Tanjung Lumpur; FT 2 Beserah; FT 135 Teluk Cempedak	T-junctions
