= Kuantan Bypass =

Federal Route 3
- Kuantan Bypass

Route information
- Part of AH18
- Maintained by Malaysian Public Works Department
- Existed: 1977–present
- History: Completed in 1979

Major junctions
- North end: Gebeng
- FT 3 / AH18 Federal Route 3 FT 2 Jalan Beserah; FT 3485 Jalan Kawasan Perindustrian Gebeng; FT 14 Jerangau–Jabor Highway; FT 231 Jalan Sungai Lembing; FT 229 Jalan Permatang Badak; FT 420 Sultan Haji Ahmad Shah Airport Road; FT 2 Gambang–Kuantan Highway
- South end: Kuantan Airport (South) Interchange on FT 2 Gambang–Kuantan Highway

Location
- Country: Malaysia
- Primary destinations: Kuala Terengganu, Sungai Lembing, Bandar Indera Mahkota, Gambang, Kuantan Airport

Highway system
- Highways in Malaysia; Expressways; Federal; State

Kuantan Bypass, Federal Route 3, AH18, often called as Bypass Kuantan or Jalan Pintasan Kuantan is a main highway bypass in Kuantan, Pahang, Malaysia.

== Route background ==
The Kuantan Bypass starts at Kuantan Airport South Interchange, at its interchange with the Federal Route 2, the main trunk road of the central of Peninsular Malaysia.

At most sections, the Kuantan Bypass was built under the JKR R5 road standard, allowing maximum speed limit of up to 90 km/h.

There are no alternate routes or sections with motorcycle lanes.

== History ==
It was built in 1977 until it was completed in 1979.

The upgrade from trunk road bypass into dual carriageway bypass was begun in 2005 and was completed in 2007.

On 6 August 2025, Twin Box Culvert construction at Kuantan Bypass started and completed on 5 September 2025.

== Accidents ==
- On 9 December 2025, one man dead in an accident involved trailer and pickup vehicle.

== Junction lists ==
The entire route is located in Kuantan District, Pahang.

Legend:

- I/C - Interchange, I/S - Intersection, RSA - Rest and service area, OBR - Overhead bridge restaurant, R/R - Restaurant and rest plaza, L/B - Layby, V/P - Vista point, TN - tunnel, T/P - Toll plaza, BR - Bridge
- C - Cloverleaf, S - Stack, T-A - Trumpet-A, T-B - Trumpet-B, DT - Directional-T/Y, SDT - Semi-Directional-T/Y, P-Y - Partial-Y, D - Diamond, P-C - Partial cloverleaf, D-D - Diverging diamond, D-R - Direct ramp

Location	km	mi	Exit	Name	Destinations	Notes
Gebeng			Through to FT 3 / AH18 Malaysia Federal Route 3			
Gebeng			1	Gebeng I/S	FT 2 Jalan Beserah – Kuantan Port, Beserah, Kuantan, TLDM Tanjung Gelang Naval Base	T-junctions
Gebeng			2	Gebeng Industrial Area I/S	FT 3485 Jalan Kawasan Perindustrian Gebeng – Gebeng Industrial Area, BASF-Petronas petrochemicals plant, Lynas Malaysia, Lynas Advanced Materials Plant (LAMP)	T-junctions
Gebeng			Sungai Balok bridge			
Gebeng				SIRIM East Coast Office	SIRIM East Coast Office	Northbound only
Gebeng			3	Jerangau-Jabor Highway I/C	FT 14 Jerangau–Jabor Highway – Jabur, Bandar Al-Muktafi Billah Shah, Bukit Besi, Jerangau East Coast Expressway / AH141 – Kuala Lumpur, Kuala Terengganu FT 101 / AH141 Gebeng Bypass – Chukai (Kemaman), Kuala Terengganu, Cherating, Malaysian Maritime Enforcement Agency (MMEA) Academy (Sultan Ahmad Shah Maritime Academy (AMSAS))	Trumpet interchange
Semambu			4	Bandar Damansara Kuantan I/S	Jalan BDK Utama; Bandar Damansara Kuantan	Northbound only
Semambu			5	Semambu I/C	Jalan Semambu Pintasan Kuantan – Politeknik Sultan Haji Ahmad Shah (POLISAS); FT 3486 Jalan Semambu – Jabur, Perasing, Semambu, Kuantan	Diamond interchange
Semambu				Taman Jubli Perak Sultan Ahmad Shah	Taman Jubli Perak Sultan Ahmad Shah	Northbound only
Bandar Indera Mahkota			6	Bandar Indera Mahkota (North) I/C	Jalan Istana Abdul Aziz – Istana Abdul Aziz (Tengku Mahkota Pahang), Taman Alam Perdana, Bukit Istana, KotaSAS; Persiaran Sultan Abu Bakar – Indera Mahkota 7 and 8, International Islamic University Malaysia (IIUM) Kuantan Campus	Diamond interchange
Bandar Indera Mahkota				Mahkota Valley	Mahkota Valley – Universiti Tunku Abdul Rahman Kuantan campus	Northbound only
Bandar Indera Mahkota			7	Bandar Indera Mahkota Sentral I/C	FT 231 Jalan Sungai Lembing – Sungai Lembing, Panching, Sungai Lembing Museum, Kampung Padang, Bandar Indera Mahkota town centre, Kuantan, Teluk Cempedak, Beserah, Ministry of Home Affairs Complex (Pahang Branch) (Kompleks Kementerian Dalam Negeri (KDN) Negeri Pahang) East Coast Expressway / AH141 – Kuala Lumpur, Kuala Terengganu	Cloverleaf interchange
Bandar Indera Mahkota				Terminal Sentral Kuantan	Terminal Sentral Kuantan – Arrival/Departure	Southbound
Bandar Indera Mahkota			8	Bandar Indera Mahkota (South) I/C	Jalan Sultan Abdullah – Indera Mahkota 14 and 15; Persiaran Sultan Abu Bakar – Indera Mahkota 1 to 6, WIDAD college	Diamond Interchange
Kuantan				Kampung Songsang		
Kuantan			Shell Layby (northbound)			
Kuantan				Kampung Sungai Tiram		
Kuantan			Kuantan River bridge			
Kuantan			9	Permatang Badak I/S	FT 229 Jalan Permatang Badak – Permatang Badak, Bukit Rangin, Kampung Sungai Isap Damai	T-junctions
Kuantan				Taman Permatang Badak		
Kuantan			Shell Layby (southbound)			
Kuantan				Rumah Murah Permatang Badak		
Kuantan				Kampung Pandan Dua		
Kuantan				Taman Pandan Damai		
Kuantan			10	Kuantan Airport (North) I/C	FT 420 Sultan Haji Ahmad Shah Airport Road – Sultan Haji Ahmad Shah Airport	T-junctions
Kuantan			11	Kuantan Airport (South) I/C	FT 2 / AH18 Gambang–Kuantan Highway – Kuala Lumpur, Gambang, Segamat, Kuantan, Pekan	Trumpet interchange
1.000 mi = 1.609 km; 1.000 km = 0.621 mi: Concurrency terminus; Incomplete access

== See also ==
- Malaysia Federal Route 3
- Asian Highway Network
- AH18
- Malaysian Federal Roads system
