= CGSO =

CGSO may refer to:

- Chief Government Security Office
- Complete Game Shutout in baseball, see Complete game and Shutouts in baseball
