= Malaysia Office of the Chief Government Security Officer =

Chief Government Security Officer
- Government of Malaysia
- Abbreviation: CGSO
- Motto: Lindungi Aset Negara ("Protect National Assets")

Agency overview
- Formed: 1957; 69 years ago
- Employees: 379 (2018)
- Annual budget: MYR 23,672,100 (2018)

Jurisdictional structure
- National agency: Malaysia
- Operations jurisdiction: Malaysia
- Primary governing body: Government of Malaysia
- Secondary governing body: Prime Minister's Department (Malaysia)

Operational structure
- Headquarters: Perdana Putra

Website
- www.cgso.gov.my

Malaysia Office of the Chief Government Security Officer (CGSO; Malay: Pejabat Ketua Pegawai Keselamatan Kerajaan Malaysia) is a unit under the Prime Minister's Department of the Malaysian federal government. CGSO is tasked with developing and implementing security policies and procedures to protect government personnel, facilities, and assets from internal and external threats.

== History ==
The Chief Government Security Officer (CGSO) was appointed on June 15, 1957, to be responsible to the Permanent Secretary of the Prime Minister's Department. The CGSO's terms of reference are set out in the Government Security Officer's Confidential General Circular No. 1, of 1958.

The CGSO's main task is to provide security advisory services to government agencies. This helps to protect against espionage, sabotage, and unauthorized information leakage. The CGSO's office was moved to the Ministry of Home Affairs in the early 1960s, but it was moved back to the Prime Minister's Department in 1977. The CGSO's office continues to execute its duties and responsibilities related to protection security as set by the government.

== Functions ==
- Develop policies to manage protection security and address threats of sabotage that may affect the functionality of the government and national interests.
- Promote awareness and encourage a culture of safeguarding.
- Enforce compliance with the Official Secrets Act 1972 and the Safety Directive (Revised and Amended 2017).
- Ensure compliance with ICT Protection Security in accordance with the Security Directive (Revision and Amendment 2017) and relevant regulations.
- Ensure compliance with ICT Protection Security in accordance with the Security Directive (Revision and Amendment 2017) and relevant regulations.
- Manage personal security policies for public officials and private parties related to protecting assets and important national targets.
