= National Security Council Act 2016 =

Parliament of Malaysia
- Long title: An Act to provide for the establishment of the National Security Council, the declaration of security areas, the special powers of the Security Forces in the security areas and other related matters.
- Citation: Act 776
- Territorial extent: Malaysia
- Passed by: Dewan Rakyat
- Passed: 3 December 2015
- Passed by: Dewan Negara
- Passed: 22 December 2015
- Royal assent: 18 February 2016
- Effective: 1 August 2016, [P.U. (B) 310/2016]

Legislative history

Initiating chamber: Dewan Rakyat
- Bill title: National Security Council Bill 2015
- Bill citation: D.R. 38/2015
- Introduced by: Shahidan Kassim, Minister in the Prime Minister's Department
- First reading: 1 December 2015
- Second reading: 3 December 2015
- Third reading: 3 December 2015

Revising chamber: Dewan Negara
- Bill title: National Security Council Bill 2015
- Bill citation: D.R. 38/2015
- Member(s) in charge: Shahidan Kassim, Minister in the Prime Minister's Department
- First reading: 7 December 2015
- Second reading: 21 December 2015
- Third reading: 22 December 2015

Amended by
- National Security Council (Amendment) Act 2020 [Act A1625]

Related legislation
- Public Authorities Protection Act 1948 [Act 198]

Keywords
- National security council, national security
- Status: In force

National Security Council Act 2016 (Malay: Akta Majlis Keselamatan Negara 2016) is a Malaysian law that "provide for the establishment of the National Security Council, the declaration of security areas, the special powers of the Security Forces in the security areas and other related matters". The Malaysian government claimed that this Act is intended to strengthen the government's ability to address increasing threats to the nation's security, including threats of violent extremism. Its bill was introduced into parliament by Shahidan Kassim on 1 December 2015. It was passed by the Dewan Rakyat (House of Representatives) on 3 December 2015, and the Dewan Negara (Senate) on 22 December 2015 without amendment.

The Act was deemed to have received royal assent on 18 February 2016 in pursuant to Clause 4A of Article 66 of the Federal Constitution, where a bill is automatically deemed to have been assented and becomes law if the Yang di-Pertuan Agong (King) did not give his assent within 30 days after the bill was presented to him. This Act is thought to be the first ever Act of Parliament in Malaysia to become law in this manner without the express assent of the monarch.

The Act has faced considerable consideration from human rights groups and other organisations both within Malaysia and internationally. Before the bill passed the Senate, the European Parliament passed a resolution calling for the Bill's withdrawal.

Following the 2018 Malaysian general election, Prime Minister Mahathir Mohamad announced that the act would be reviewed for possible amendments. In 2020, the act was amended to remove the power to declare security zones from the Prime Minister. The authority to do so was instead shifted to the King, acting on the advice of the National Security Council, and any such declaration would need to be tabled at the closest parliamentary sitting.

In 2021, in the case of Datuk Seri Anwar Ibrahim v. Kerajaan Malaysia & Anor, the Federal Court of Malaysia ruled that the act was not unconstitutional in a 5-2 decision.

== Structure ==
The National Security Council Act 2016, in its current form (7 June 2016), consists of 7 Parts containing 44 sections and no schedule (including no amendment).

- Part I: Preliminary
- Part II: National Security Council
- Part III: Duties of the Director General of National Security and Government Entities
- Part IV: Declaration of Security Area
- Part V: Special Powers of the Director of Operations and Security Forces Deployed to the Security Area
- Part VI: General
- Part VII: Savings
