= Research Division of the Prime Minister's Department =

Malaysian government agency

Research Division
- Coat of arms of Malaysia

Agency overview
- Formed: 1960 (66 years ago)
- Headquarters: Putrajaya, Malaysia
- Employees: Classified (est. 300-1000)
- Annual budget: Classified
- Parent department: Prime Minister's Department

The Research Division of the Prime Minister's Department (Malay: Bahagian Penyelidikan Jabatan Perdana Menteri) is an agency within the Malaysian Prime Minister's Department. According to a leaked US diplomatic cable dating back to 2006, the Research Division is actually the public name for the Malaysian External Intelligence Organisation (MEIO), the country's main foreign intelligence agency.

As Malaysia's national security covert intelligence agency, MEIO is estimated to have between 300 and 1000 agents, officers, and operatives around the world, with approximately half stationed abroad. Its offices are located in Putrajaya and Jalan Bellamy in Kuala Lumpur.

In its operations, MEIO works with several other Malaysian government departments and agencies including the Special Branch, Malaysia Defence Intelligence Organisation, and National Security Council. MEIO has covert intelligence sources around the world and shares its information with the Prime Minister, the Malaysian Cabinet, and other agencies.

== History ==
=== Origins and operations ===
The Research Division was established during the 1960s as part of Malaysia's national security covert intelligence agency. Muhammad Hatta, the Secretary of the Malaysian National Security Council, was known to have served as MEIO's Director General from 2002 to 2005. It was also known to have helped the Malaysian Special Branch in combating the Malayan Communist Party. According to leaked cables, the Malaysian External Intelligence Organisation also covertly supported the secessionist groups in Mindanao. More recently, MEIO reportedly helped to combat the Islamic State.

=== Post–2018 Malaysian general election ===
According to reports by several Malaysian news media including The Star, The Sun, and the news blog Malaysia Today in May 2018, the Malaysian External Intelligence Organisation had 300 personnel, operated as a spy agency, and reported directly to former Prime Minister Najib Tun Razak. The organization was allegedly used to monitor government critics at home and abroad. Following the 2018 Malaysian general election, members of the Royal Malaysia Police's Commercial Crime Division searched the home of a female individual, who was reported to be the head of the Malaysian External Intelligence Organisation, for documents that Najib had given her two days before the 2018 election. The Police also searched two buildings belonging to the agency.

In late July 2018, a letter from MEIO's Director-General Hasanah Abu Hamid dating back to 4 May 2018 was leaked to the media. The letter was reportedly addressed to Gina Haspel, the designated Director of the Central Intelligence Agency and appealed for the Trump Administration to support Najib's administration even in the event that Barisan Nasional won by a simple majority or just one seat. In response, the Finance Minister Lim Guan Eng called for an investigation into allegations that the Research Division had written to the CIA, describing the letter as an attempt to solicit foreign intervention.

Meanwhile, former Prime Minister Najib denied having any knowledge of the Research Division's letter, claiming that it was a government secret not meant for public eyes. During a press conference on 31 July, Hasanah's lawyer Datuk Shaharudin Ali confirmed that the letter was genuine and asserted that the letter between MEIO and the CIA was part of the work of intelligence gathering and national security. The former Director Hasanah lodged a police report on the grounds that the letter should not have been leaked for national security reasons. On 6 August 2018, Ab Jalil Backer, the leader of a group called Angkatan Karyawan Nasionalis, claimed that the CIA had leaked MEIO's letter and also alleged that the US spy agency had been colluding with Pakatan Harapan.

In May 2018, amid changes in the government under the Seventh Mahathir cabinet, discussions arose regarding the potential abolition of the Malaysian External Intelligence Organisation (MEIO), as reported by a news article. The Division's Director-General until the 2018 Malaysian general election was Datuk Hasanah Abdul Hamid.

Following the election, on 22 August 2018, Ahmad Shublee Othman was appointed as the new Director of MEIO.

In late August 2018, former MEIO director-general Hasanah was remanded in police custody over alleged misappropriation of election funds during the 2018 general election. In April 2021, Hasanah was granted a "discharge not amounting to an acquittal" in a trial involving misuse of funds from the 1Malaysia Development Berhad (1MDB) sovereign fund.

In June 2022, Hasanah applied to have her "discharge not amounting to an acquittal" converted to a full acquittal, which was granted on 10 August 2022 by Judicial Commissioner Roz Mawar Rozain.

=== Present day ===
Recent developments indicate MEIO's revival under new leadership following the restructuring. The research division, which functioned as a front for an intelligence agency under the previous Barisan Nasional government, will not be disbanded but given new direction under a new chief, as stated by high-placed sources.

== Functions ==
The Research Division of the Prime Minister's Department is tasked with helping to improve national security and well-being, strengthen national sovereignty, and maintain the country's international reputation.
