= Bandar Damansara Kuantan =

Township in Pahang, Malaysia

Coordinates: 3°53′45.6″N 103°20′12.9″E

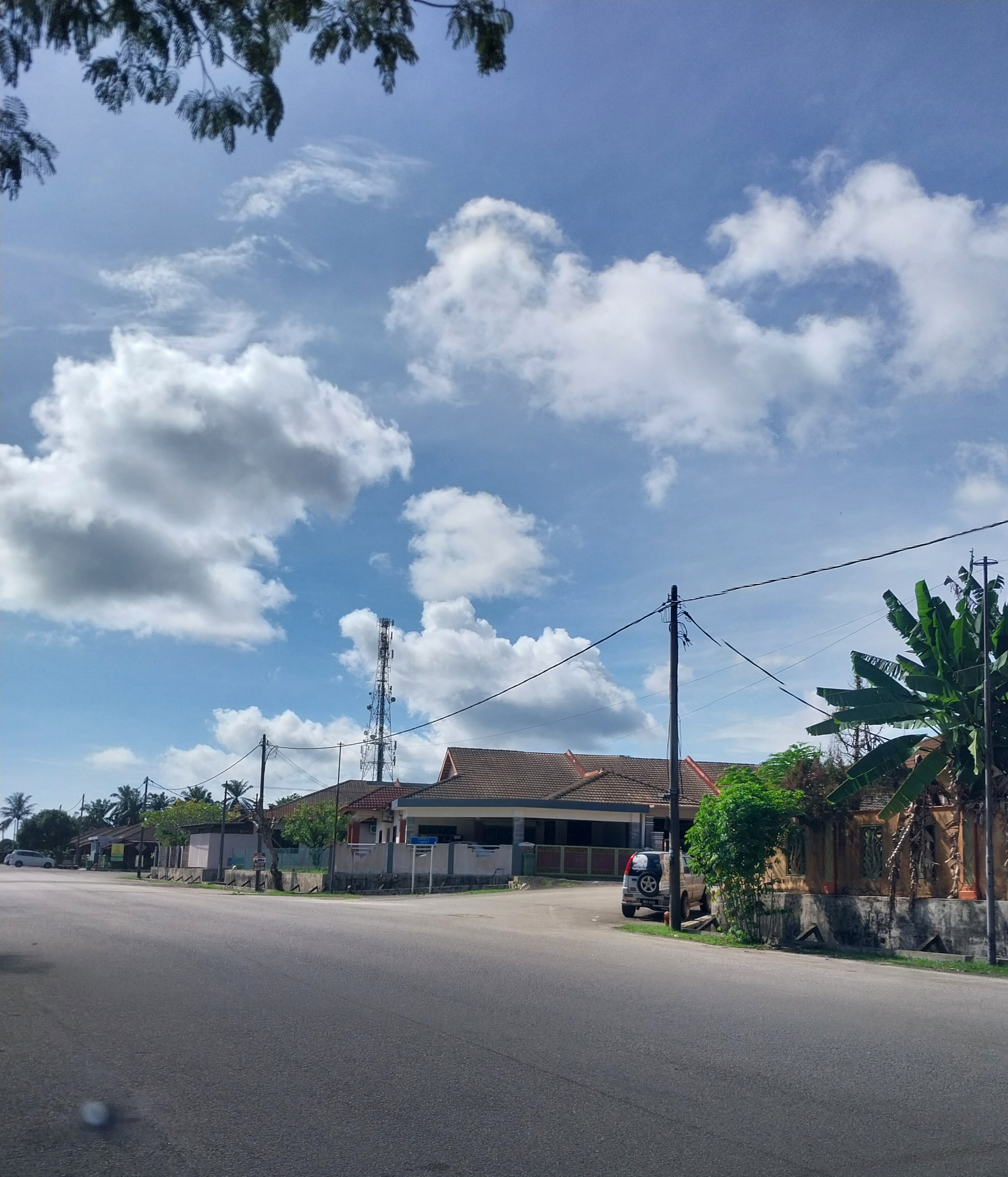
Residences of Bandar Damansara, Kuantan

Bandar Damansara is a township in Kuantan District, Pahang, Malaysia. It was first launched in June 2000. The township encompasses an area of 2,050 acres (8.3 km^{2}) and is situated 10 km north of Kuantan and is adjacent to the Kuantan Bypass, which connects Kuantan with the Kuantan Port.

Bandar Damansara is a fully integrated mixed development based on a modern living garden township, situated within Beserah and Sungai Karang. The township offers residents a comprehensive mix of facilities and amenities for an enlightened, active and contemporary lifestyle. The township is planned with a green zone area, landscape linear parks and a 1.6 km long waterway that is connected to a central lake park. Built on an elevated land, the harmonious “Feng Shui” elements of hill and water complement the project.

Bandar Damansara is accessible from the T-junction at kilometer 20 of Kuantan Bypass by a dual-carriage access road. It is also easily accessible from any part of Kuantan via the arterial road which links Kuantan – KL road and Kuantan – Terengganu road and takes a mere 10 minutes drive directly to the town centre via this bypass. The East Coast Expressway also provides alternative access to Damansara Kuantan.

In the early development phase, Damansara Realty sold the parcels of land to other developers in order to expedite the development of the planned township. Pasdec Damansara township by Pasdec Holdings Berhad, Jeram Estate by Franky Construction and another sizeable land was allocated for the small and medium scale industries by a subsidiary of Kinsteel Berhad. Neighborhood community that grows together with Bandar Damansara is PSJ-Damansara which is currently preparing a new business and residential development phase.

Bandar Damansara has a secondary (cluster type – Premier level) school, Sekolah Menengah Kebangsaan Sultanah Hajjah Kalsom (SHAKS), with about 600 students.

Located about 7 kilometers away through Kuantan Bypass road, another secondary school is Sekolah Menengah Kebangsaan Semambu and Sekolah Kebangsaan Air Putih. If there were a connecting road between PSJ-Damansara and Jalan Jabor Lama, the distance to these schools will be just about two and a half kilometers away.

Located just about 2 kilometers to the west of Pasdec Damansara is the north portal of the East Coast Rail Link (ECRL) tunnel connecting between Kota SAS Station to the southwest and Gebeng Port City to the northeast. In Kuantan Development Master Plan the road linkage between Batu Hitam – Bandar Damansara – Kota SAS – Bandar Indera Mahkota will form a circular connection making easier access to other township and to Kuantan City. Local authority support in making the road accessible to the nearby villages such as Jabor, Aspa Cottage and Sungai Karang, which will make Damansara Township more accessible and appealing.

Effort by the local community, leaders, activists and Kuantan Municipal Council to develop the existing main lake to become another public recreational place is still in development.
