= Sultan Haji Ahmad Shah Airport Road =

Road in Malaysia

Federal Route --
- Jalan Lapangan Terbang Sultan Haji Ahmad Shah 苏丹阿末沙机场公路

Route information
- Maintained by Malaysian Public Works Department
- Length: 0.64 km (0.40 mi; 2,100 ft)

Major junctions
- East end: Kuantan Bypass
- FT 3 / AH18 Kuantan Bypass; C117 Jalan Kampung Pandan 1
- West end: Kampung Pandan Dua

Location
- Country: Malaysia
- Primary destinations: Sultan Haji Ahmad Shah Airport

Highway system
- Highways in Malaysia; Expressways; Federal; State

Jalan Lapangan Terbang Sultan Haji Ahmad Shah, formerly Federal Route 420, is a institutional federal road in Kuantan, Pahang, Malaysia. It is a main route to Sultan Haji Ahmad Shah Airport.

The Kilometre Zero is located at Kuantan Bypass junctions.

At most sections, the Federal Route 420 was built under the JKR R5 road standard, with a speed limit of 90 km/h (56 mph).

== Junction lists ==
The entire route is located in Kuantan District, Pahang.

Legend:

- I/C - Interchange, I/S - Intersection, RSA - Rest and service area, OBR - Overhead bridge restaurant, R/R - Restaurant and rest plaza, L/B - Layby, V/P - Vista point, TN - tunnel, T/P - Toll plaza, BR - Bridge
- C - Cloverleaf, S - Stack, T-A - Trumpet-A, T-B - Trumpet-B, DT - Directional-T/Y, SDT - Semi-Directional-T/Y, P-Y - Partial-Y, D - Diamond, P-C - Partial cloverleaf, D-D - Diverging diamond, D-R - Direct ramp

Location	km	mi	Name	Destinations	Notes
Sultan Haji Ahmad Shah Airport	0.0	0.0	Kuantan Bypass	FT 3 / AH18 Kuantan Bypass – Kuala Terengganu, Chukai, Kuantan Port, Bandar Indera Mahkota, Kuantan, Gambang, Temerloh East Coast Expressway / AH141 – Kuala Terengganu, Kuala Lumpur	T-junctions
Sultan Haji Ahmad Shah Airport			Jalan Pandan 1	C117 Jalan Pandan 1	T-junctions
Sultan Haji Ahmad Shah Airport			Sultan Haji Ahmad Shah Airport	Sultan Haji Ahmad Shah Airport – Arrival/Departure	
Sultan Haji Ahmad Shah Airport			Perkampungan Pandan Aman 1		
Sultan Haji Ahmad Shah Airport			Kampung Pandan Dua		
1.000 mi = 1.609 km; 1.000 km = 0.621 mi
