= National Security Council (Malaysia) =

Government agency

Malaysian National Security Council
- Majlis Keselamatan Negara Malaysia (NSC / MKN) مجليس کسلامتن نݢارا مليسيا
- Seal

Agency overview
- Formed: 7 July 1971; 55 years ago
- Preceding agency: National Operations Council / Majlis Gerakan Negara; 'MAGERAN' (1969–1971)
- Jurisdiction: Government of Malaysia
- Headquarters: Perdana Putra, Putrajaya
- Motto: "Strategik, Keselamatan, Kedaulatan" (Strategy, Security, Sovereignty)
- Minister responsible: Anwar Ibrahim, Chairman
- Agency executive: YM Raja Dato’ Nushirwan bin Zainal Abidin, Director-General
- Parent department: Prime Minister's Department
- Website: www.mkn.gov.my

The Malaysian National Security Council (NSC; Malay: Majlis Keselamatan Negara Malaysia, MKN; Jawi: مجليس کسلامتن نݢارا مليسيا) is a federal agency under the Prime Minister's Department. NSC is the agency responsible for coordinating Malaysia's national security policies and responses. It oversees public order, defense, and essential services at all levels of government. The NSC adapts to emerging threats and issues directives to guide the country's security efforts.

It is chaired by the Prime Minister of Malaysia and consists of the council's executive members, including the Deputy Prime Minister as deputy chairman, NSC Director General, three ministers (Minister of Defence, Minister of Home Affairs and the Minister of Communications and Multimedia), the Chief Secretary to the Government, the Chief of Defence Forces (CDF) and the Inspector-General of Police (IGP).

== History ==
The 13 May 1969 racial riot incident raised the awareness of various parties on the importance of managing the difference and sensitivity that exists in a multi-racial community like Malaysia. Following this incident, the National Operations Council (Malay: Majlis Gerakan Negara; MAGERAN) was established. MAGERAN's existence was to improve public safety, national defence and preservation peace for the general public, supplies and services critical to the nation. When the situation improved, MAGERAN was dissolved in early 1971.

The Government, nonetheless, felt that the existence of a body/agency responsible for the management of safety matters at the national, state and district level was needed as there were still communist threats and the relationship between the races was still fragile. On 23 February 1971, the Government established the National Security Council to co-ordinate policies related to the nation's safety and to provide instructions on safety including security movements, public peaceful and all matters related to safety.

The Office of the National Security Council Secreatriat was established to undertake administration and secretarial duties for the National Security Council. In 1995, the Office of the National Security Council was reorganised as National Security Division (BKN) where the State Security Secretariat Office and District Security Secretariat Office fell under the jurisdiction of the Prime Minister's Department and thereafter underwent a name change to State and District National Security Division. The National Security Division is responsible for the co-ordination of policies related to safety as well as to instruct on the necessary actions taken by related agencies.

On 24 July 2007, the National Security Division was once again reorganised and became the National Security Council, where the State Security Division became the State Security Council and the District Security Division became the District Security Council. The reorganisation was to ensure that the National Security Council carried out its function as a policy maker relating to national safety and to provide instructions on safety as a whole.

On 26 October 2016, a Special Operations counter-terrorism Task force was added under NSC as a response to global terrorism activity. The world first one-of-a-kind unit is a combination of Special Operations Force between Malaysian Armed Forces, Royal Malaysian Police and Malaysian Maritime Enforcement Agency.

== Functions ==
Leading the formulation, coordination, and implementation of national security policies comprehensively, integratively, and effectively.

== List of Directors-General of the National Security Council ==
No.	Name	Term start	Term end	Ref
1.	Zulkifeli Mohd Zin	15 August 2016	31 August 2018	
2.	YM Datuk Seri Utama Engku Hamzah Tuan Mat	1 September 2018	29 September 2019	
3.	Datuk Seri Utama Mohd Rabin Basir	7 October 2019	15 July 2020	
4.	Datuk Seri Utama Bujang Md Saad Ulis	15 July 2021	15 February 2023	
5.	Datuk Mohamed Thajudeen Abdul Wahab	15 February 2023	1 November 2024	
6.	Datuk Mohammed Farid Dato' Baharudiin	1 November 2024	Incumbent	

== Members ==
=== Permanent members ===
No.	Name	Official Office	Ref
1.	Dato' Seri Anwar Ibrahim, Chairman	Prime Minister	
2.	Dato’ Seri Dr. Ahmad Zahid Hamidi, Dato’ Seri Fadillah Yusof, Deputy Chairman	Deputy Prime Minister	
3.	Datuk Mohamed Thajudeen Abdul Wahab	Director-General of National Security Council	
4.	Dato' Seri Mohamed Khaled Nordin	Minister of Defence	
5.	Dato' Seri Saifuddin Nasution Ismail	Minister of Home Affairs	
6.	Datuk Ahmad Fahmi Mohamed Fadzil	Minister of Communications and Digital	
7.	Shamsul Azri Abu Bakar	Chief Secretary to the Government	
8.	Tan Sri Malek Razak Sulaiman	Chief of Defence Forces	
9.	IGP Tan Sri Mohd Khalid Ismail	Inspector-General of Police	

== National Security Council Bill 2015 ==
On Thursday, 3 December 2015, The National Security Council Bill 2015 was passed in Parliament after a marathon six-hour proceeding. The bill was passed quickly, taking two days to gain the majority vote, with 107 in favour and 74 against the bill. Among the contents of the bill are:

- Clause 18 (1): PM has full discretion to decide where 'security area' is
- Clause 18 (3) and (4): Initial declaration of ‘security area’ lasts for 6 months but may be renewed by PM indefinitely
- Clause 22–30: security forces can arrest without warrant; stop and search; enter and search premise; take possession of any land, building or movable property.
- Clause 37: All NSC's affairs are done in absolute secrecy
- Clause 38: No action or lawsuit can be brought against the NSC

Unlike the Internal Security Act 1960 which requires the discretion of the Yang di-Pertuan Agong, the NSC bill is under the direct authority of the Prime Minister. Further, while the Prime Minister has to seek advice from the 8-man security council, he can choose to ignore the advice. The Malaysian Bar called the bill a "lurch towards an authoritarian government".
