= Sultan Haji Ahmad Shah Airport =

Airport in Kuantan, Pahang, Malaysia

Sultan Ahmad Shah Airport Lapangan Terbang Sultan Ahmad Shah
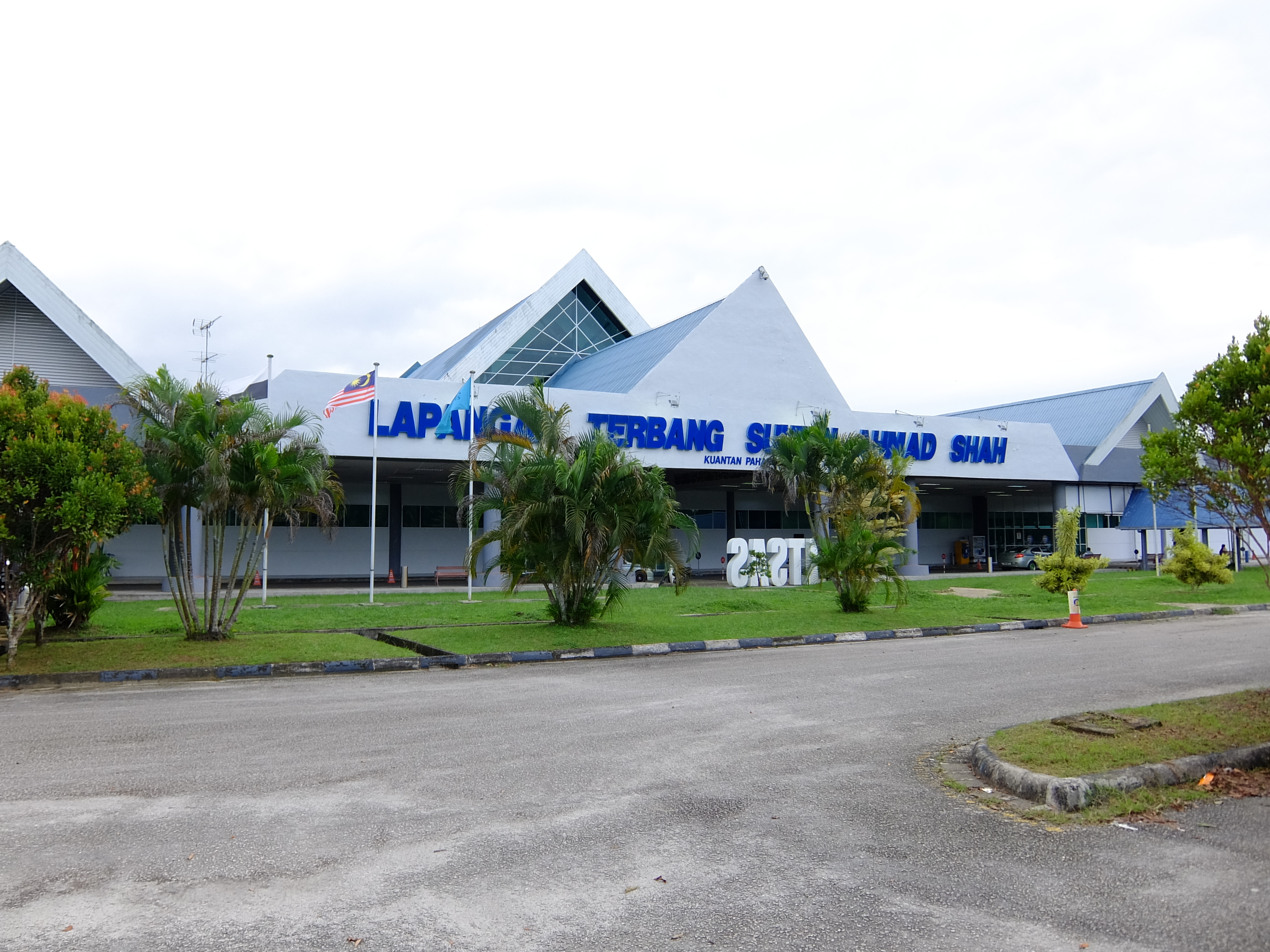
- IATA: KUA; ICAO: WMKD

Summary
- Airport type: Public/military
- Owner: Government of Malaysia
- Operator: Malaysia Airports Holdings Berhad
- Serves: Kuantan
- Location: Kuantan, Pahang, Malaysia
- Time zone: MST (UTC+08:00)
- Elevation AMSL: 55 ft (17 m)
- Coordinates: 03°46′11″N 103°12′34″E

Maps
- Pahang state in Malaysia

- Location in Kuantan, Pahang, Peninsular Malaysia KUA /WMKD (Malaysia) KUA /WMKD (Southeast Asia) KUA /WMKD (Asia)

Runways
Direction	Length		Surface
Direction	m	ft	Surface
18/36	2,743	8,999	Asphalt

Statistics (2023)
- Passenger: 176,100 (▲69.4%)
- Airfreight (tonnes): 28 (▲475.4%)
- Aircraft movements: 1,827 (▲46.7%)
- MAHB; AIP Malaysia

Sultan Ahmad Shah Airport (IATA: KUA, ICAO: WMKD) is an airport that serves Kuantan, a city in the state of Pahang, Malaysia. The airport is located 15 km from the city. In 2009, the airport handled 226,912 passengers on 3,110 flights, though the airport is able to handle over one million passengers annually. In 2008, Taiwan and Tourism Malaysia co-operated so that there were 23 charter flights directly from Taipei to Kuantan Airport; this made Kuantan Sultan Ahmad Shah Airport the first airport on the East Coast of Peninsular Malaysia that received international flights. Passengers have to walk from the aircraft to the arrival hall.

Co-located with the airport is RMAF Kuantan, housing 15 Squadron (BAE Hawk) and 17 Squadron (MiG-29) of the Royal Malaysian Air Force.

== History ==
The airport was reported to have limited facilities for custom clearances in October 1983. The facility was planned to be expanded "in the next two or three months".

In January 1990, preliminary works for the expansion of the airport was made, with construction planned to start in mid-1990 and completed at the end of 1991. The project included upgrading and extension of the tarmac of the airport and construction of a new terminal building which cost RM 49 million and a road expansion project from the airport to the city centre which cost RM 100 million. The expanded airport opened on 1 July 1992 at a cost of RM 65 million.

=== Proposed relocation ===
Proposals for relocating the airport have been recorded since 2015, with early suggestions for it to be either located nearer to the coast at Penor, or possibly around the same area of its original location. The operational capacity of the current airport is severely limited, mainly due to the nature of the airport being co-located with the RMAF Kuantan (which poses risks to national security) and also constraints of being surrounded by residential areas, both of which make it difficult to increase the frequency of flights and its capacity for expansion. Adding to this, the airport infrastructure is outdated, lacking any jet bridges, and is small, insufficient for larger crowds.

Following this, there are also demands to establish a regional hub for international flights in the East Coast Peninsular Region, as stated in the "Rancangan Fizikal Negara ke-4".

The Menteri Besar of Pahang, Wan Rosdy Wan Ismail announced in July 2021 the development of a RM 10.5 billion aerospace city, integrating a new international airport with air cargo and MRO (Maintenance, Repair and Overhaul) capabilities. This project is to be headed by Pahang Corporation Sdn Bhd (Pahang Corp) on an area measuring 5,024 ha in Chendor, adjacent to the ECRL railway station at Cherating, which is expected to be completed by early 2027. The development of this airport is expected to coincide with the establishment of Kuantan Port as an international logistics and manufacturing hub. This will also allow the return of full control of the air force base to the RMAF.

An MoU was signed between Pahang Corp, Gading Group Sdn Bhd and Aviation Industry Corporation of China (AVIC) on 12 July 2022. Construction is expected to commence in 2024 and the airport is expected to begin operations in 2026.

== Airlines and destinations ==
Airlines	Destinations
Malaysia Airlines	Kuala Lumpur–International
Scoot	Singapore

== Statistics ==
Annual passenger numbers and aircraft statistics
Year	Passengers handled	Passenger % change	Cargo (tonnes)	Cargo % change	Aircraft movements	Aircraft % change
2003	351,179	Steady	64	Steady	4,054	Steady
2004	349,375	▼0.5	64	Steady	4,088	▲0.8
2005	298,184	▼14.6	75	▲17.2	3,757	▼8.1
2006	273,005	▼8.4	109	▲45.3	2,973	▼20.9
2007	262,486	▼3.8	103	▼5.5	3,487	▲17.3
2008	259,529	▼1.1	70	▼32.0	3,551	▲1.8
2009	226,912	▼12.6	70	Steady	3,110	▼12.4
2010	220,878	▼2.7	49	▼30.0	2,802	▼9.9
2011	248,846	▲12.7	38	▼22.4	3,452	▲23.2
2012	280,074	▲12.5	57	▲50.5	3,613	▲4.7
2013	317,440	▲13.3	86	▲51.2	3,663	▲1.4
2014	314,130	▼1.0	46	▼46.9	3,911	▲6.8
2015	292,109	▼7.0	21	▼55.2	4,174	▲6.7
2016	247,757	▼15.2	15	▼27.3	3,493	▼16.3
2017	241,314	▼2.6	25	▲65.3	2,893	▼17.2
2018	258,816	▲7.3	13	▼47.4	3,013	▲4.1
2019	394,599	▲52.5	2.8	▼78.4	4,082	▲35.5
2020	71,877	▼84.3	3.0	▲7.9	1,117	▼72.6
2021	21,251	▼70.4	3.0	Steady	439	▼60.7
2022	103,961	▲389.2	5.0	▲46.8	1,245	▲183.6
2023	176,100	▲69.4	28	▲475.4	1,827	▲46.7
^{Source: Malaysia Airports Holdings Berhad}

Busiest flights out of Sultan Haji Ahmad Shah Airport by frequency as of September 2023
Rank	Destinations	Frequency (weekly)	Airlines	Note
1	Kuala Lumpur	17	MH	
2	Singapore	3	TR	

== Passenger facilities ==
The airport has an outdoor car park, a taxi stand, several small shops, an arrival hall and a departure hall. The front part of the building housing the shops and the check in counters are not air conditioned.

== Accidents and incidents ==
- On 21 August 2025, a McDonnell Douglas F/A-18 Hornet of the Royal Malaysian Air Force crashed shortly after takeoff from the airport. The two pilots on board ejected safely.

== See also ==
- List of airports in Malaysia
