= Chendor =

Town in Kuantan District, Pahang, Malaysia

Coordinates: 4°09′38.9″N 103°23′58.5″E

Chendor is a town located in Kuantan District, Pahang, Malaysia. Chendor is a famous for their beach and resort for tourists.
