= Malaysian Industry-Government Group for High Technology =

Technology think tank based in Malaysia

Malaysian Industry Government Group for High Technology
- Abbreviation: MIGHT
- Formation: 1993
- Founded at: Putrajaya
- Type: Non-profit organisation think tank
- Headquarters: Cyberjaya
- Location: Malaysia
- Region served: Malaysia
- Parent organization: Ministry of Science, Technology and Innovation (Malaysia)
- Website: www.might.org.my

The Malaysian Industry Group High Technology (MIGHT) is a non-profit technology think tank under the purview of the Ministry of Science, Technology and Innovation (Malaysia). It was established in 1993 to support the Science Advisor to the Prime Minister and leverage multi-disciplinary and inter-ministerial synergies from both industry and government.

MIGHT was tasked to help drive the advancement of high technology competency and capacity in Malaysia. A public-private partnership organization in nature, it provides a consensus building platform for collaboration in developing policies and providing strategic advice to the government.

Through its platform and works, MIGHT gave birth to notable and strategic national initiatives such Malaysian Formula 1 Grand Prix, Kulim High-Tech Park, Malaysian Automotive Institute, Technology Depository Agency and many others.

== History ==
Malaysia's emphasis on development of science and technology is nothing new. The government has long initiated active measures to promote and develop techno-business opportunities by harnessing science and technology. In 1984, under then Prime Minister Dr. Mahathir Mohamad, a Science Advisor's post was created in the Prime Minister's Department to create a conducive ecosystem where science and technology and its uptake could flourish. The move is seen as complementary as well as to provide a second opinion to those of the relevant Ministries. Dr. Omar Abdul Rahman was appointed to the post of Science Advisor to the Prime Minister and held the post until he retired in 2001.

The seed of MIGHT was sown when a Unit under the Office of Science Advisor was created aptly named 'High Technology Special Unit' (Unit Khas Teknologi Tinggi). This unit then grew to become what MIGHT is today.

MIGHT's focus and emphasis has been very dynamic throughout the years but has always been in the areas of high technology and heavy engineering. The focus emphasis was dependent on the maturity of the industry as well as timing of the intervention.

Sector	Sector	Sector
Aerospace	Automotive	Advance Materials
Biotechnology	Cosmetics and pharmaceuticals	Energy
Electronics and electrical	Green management	Herbal
Housing and construction	Intelligent transport system	Rail transport
Road haulage	Smart city	Shipbuilding and ship repair
Telecommunication	Waste	Nanotechnology
Medical devices	Sensors	Plantation crops and commodities

== Board and management ==
=== Joint chairmen ===
MIGHT is chaired jointly by the Science advisor as well as a senior captain of the industry appointed by the Prime Minister of Malaysia.

Since 2011:

- Prof. Dr. Zakri Abdul Hamid, Science Advisor to the Prime Minister of Malaysia
- Dr. Ir. Ahmad Tajuddin Ali, Chairman of UEM Group, Chairman of SIRIM

=== Board of directors ===
MIGHT's board is represented by both senior government officials and captains of the industry.

==== Government representation ====
1. Prime Minister's Department
2. Economic Planning Unit
3. Ministry of Finance
4. Ministry of Science, Technology and Innovation
5. Ministry of Energy, Green Technology and Water
6. Ministry of International Trade and Industry

==== Industry representation ====
1. Petronas - Petroliam Nasional Berhad
2. TNB - Tenaga Nasional Berhad
3. MARA -Majlis Amanah Rakyat
4. Sime Darby Berhad
5. BPHB - Bina Puri Holdings Berhad
6. FSMSB - First Solar Malaysia Sdn Bhd
7. SCS - System Consultancy Services Sdn Bhd

=== Senior Management ===
MIGHT is helmed by a President and chief executive officer and supported by Senior Vice Presidents and Vice Presidents. The makeup of the senior management changes with the growth of the organization as well as changes in emphasis to reflect the dynamic nature of MIGHT's focus areas.

==== President and CEO ====
- Since 2008 - Dr. Yusoff Sulaiman - Website

==== Senior vice presidents ====
- Since 2012 - Dr. Raslan Ahmad - Website
- Since 2014 - Rushdi Abdul Rahim - Website

==== Vice presidents ====
- Since 2009 - Abdul Halim Bisri
- Since 2009 - Mohd Zakwan Mohd Zabidi

== Programs and activities ==
=== Foresight and futures thinking ===
Foresight and futures thinking is the core competency and activity of MIGHT. Known as technology prospecting in its early days, MIGHT has been conducting technology foresight and futures studies work to support its other activities though there are evolution and changes to the methods and processes. To expand foresight beyond technology, MIGHT created myForesight - Malaysia Foresight Institute in 2012.

==== myForesight (Malaysian Foresight Institute) ====
myForesight was created in 2012 with the objectives:

- To explore of future possibilities for better decision making
- To build national capacity in foresight and futures

=== Technology priorities and advancement ===
The outcome of MIGHT's foresight and future studies are used to prioritize technology and industry development in Malaysia. To date, MIGHT has produced more than twenty industry/sector blueprints and road maps. These documents were used as references to chart the development of various industry and technology in Malaysia. Various white papers and proposals by MIGHT are also used for these purposes.

In continuous search of new areas, some of these programs have since been passed to other government agencies or machineries to undertake.

==== Technology and industry plans and reports ====
- Malaysian high technology report
- Malaysian aerospace industry report
- Malaysian shipbuilding and ship repairs industry report
- Malaysian solar industry report

==== Technology and industry advancement programs ====
- National Offset Program (Now by Technology Depository Agency)
- Malaysia Automotive Institute (Now under the purview of Ministry of International Trade and Investment)
- Malaysia Microchip Project
- Industrialized Building System - IBS

=== Global strategies and outreach ===
Since its inception, MIGHT has actively been leveraging its global network as part of a strategy to build national capacity as well as to disseminate knowledge and expertise. Notable past activities includes Langkawi International Dialogue, various Smart Partnership program with CPTM.

==== Global Science, Innovation and Advisory Council (GSIAC) ====
GSIAC is chaired by the Prime Minister of Malaysia, YAB Dato’ Sri Mohd Najib Tun Razak, The secretary is the Science Advisor to the Prime Minister of Malaysia. The council consists of selected Malaysian Ministers, national and global corporate leaders, Nobel Laureates, eminent global academicians and researchers. The council meets once a year to deliberate on strategic and future matters that will benefit Malaysia in the long run

==== Malaysia - Korea Technology Center (myKOR) ====
myKOR or Malaysia Korea Technology Center was launched by Prime Minister Abdullah Ahmad Badawi on 20 October 2008. The center purpose is to serve as a gateway for Malaysian organizations and businesses to capitalize and gain access to the pool of Korean IPs and technologies, for the purpose of enhancing and increasing the value of Malaysian made products and services.

=== Enhancing future talents ===
Recognizing that technology and industry development will require the necessary human capital to support them, MIGHT has been involved in various human capital development programs. This is done through partnership with selected educational institutions as well as industry collaborators. These include programs that aims to promote the uptake of Science, Technology, Engineering and Mathematics (STEM) amongst students as well as industry bridging programs.

==== Kuala Lumpur Engineering Science Fair (KLESF) ====
KLESF is an annual program jointly organized by MIGHT, Akademi Sains Malaysia, Universiti Teknologi MARA and Universiti Tunku Abdul Rahman. The program objectives is to promote STEM (Science, Technology, Engineering and Mathematics) to students, parents, teachers and public alike.

==== Fame Lab Malaysia ====
Fame Lab is a science communication competition co-organized by MIGHT and British Council in search of the best science communicator in the country. In 2016, Dr Abhimanyu Veerakumarasivam, representing Malaysia won the ‘Best Science Communicator award at Fame Lab International 2016. Fame Lab International is the world's biggest science communication competitions organized in the United Kingdom attracting participants from 27 countries.

==== School Lab Malaysia ====
School Lab Malaysia is a science communication competition that aims to help students understand the exciting challenges of science, develop critical and creative thinking skills and, at the same time, gain confidence to present their understanding of scientific concepts.

=== Technopreneurship excellence ===
MIGHT's foray into entrepreneurship is due to its role in encouraging the uptake of technology business. To date MIGHT's venture into this includes technology advice and coaching, market identification and access.

==== Global Cleantech Innovation Program (GCIP) ====
Global Cleantech Innovation Program (GCIP) is a program conducted in collaboration with United Nations Industrial Development Organization (UNIDO) and Cleantech Open to assist Malaysian entrepreneurs in the area of green and clean technology. The program started in 2014 and the winners of the program are given opportunities to pitch in Silicon Valley as well as access to funding provided by Platcom Ventures.
