= SIRIM =

Malaysian standards and quality organisation

Coordinates: 03°04′04.7″N 101°30′54.8″E

SIRIM Berhad

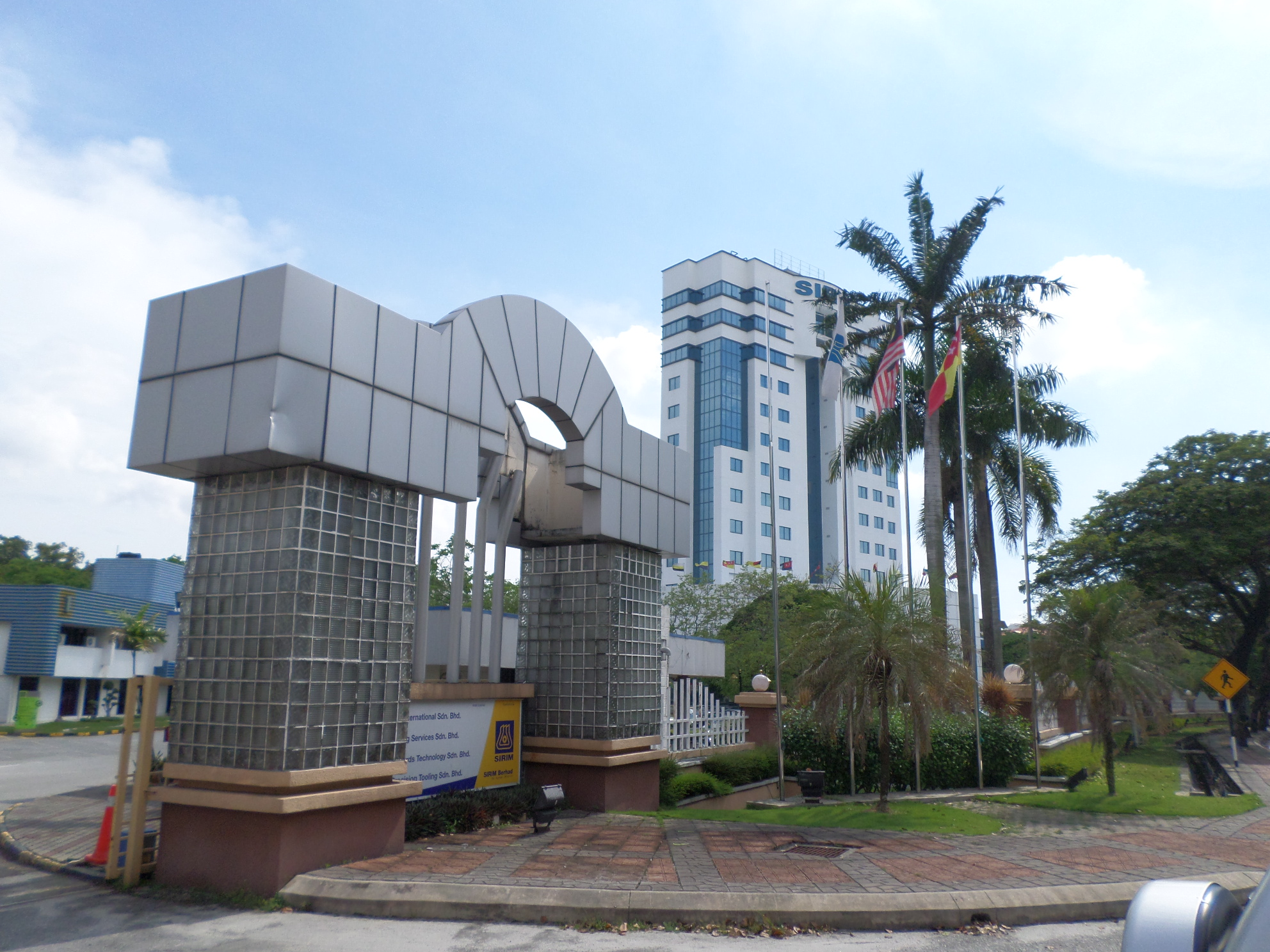
- Native name: Institut Piawaian dan Penyelidikan Perindustrian Malaysia
- Type: State-owned enterprise
- Predecessor: Standard and Industrial Research Institute of Malaysia (SIRIM)
- Founded: 1 September 1996
- Headquarters: 1, Persiaran Dato' Menteri, P.O. Box 7035, Section 2, 40700 Shah Alam, Selangor, Malaysia
- Key people: Dato' Dr. Khairol Anuar Mohamad Tawi, Chairman; Dato' Indera Dr. Ahmad Sabirin Arshad, President & Group Chief Executive
- Parent: Ministry of Trade and Industry
- Subsidiaries: SIRIM QAS International Sdn. Bhd; SIRIM STS Sdn. Bhd.; SIRIM Standards Technology Sdn. Bhd.; National Precision Tooling Sdn. Bhd.; SIRIM Tech Venture Sdn. Bhd.
- Website: www.sirim.my

SIRIM Berhad, formerly known as the Standard and Industrial Research Institute of Malaysia (SIRIM), is a corporate organization owned wholly by the Malaysian Government, under the Ministry of Trade and Industry (MITI). It has been entrusted by the Malaysian Government to be the national organization for standards and quality and as a promoter of technological excellence in the Malaysian industry. The main headquarters is located in Shah Alam, Selangor.

The organization came into operation on 1 September 1996 via a corporatization scheme of standards and industrial research institute.

== Functions ==
- To promote and undertake scientific industrial research
- To boost industrial efficiency and development
- To provide technology transfer and consultancy services
- To develop Malaysian standards and to promote standardization and quality assurance for greater competitiveness
- To enhance public and industrial welfare, health and safety

== History ==
In 1964, the Government of Malaysia directed the Minister of Commerce and Industry to make a study of the establishment of a national standards organization. This is in response to the urgent necessity of adopting the principles of standardization in light of Malaysia's accelerating industrial development.

As a result, the Standards Institution of Malaysia (SIM) was initially established as a governmental department under the Ministry of Commerce and Industry in early 1966. In October 1966, the Standards Act No. 76 was passed in Parliament making SIM the national standards body. SIM was governed by the Standards Council. The Standards Act provides the Standards Council with independent authority for the declaration of standards and the issuance of certification mark licenses.

In 1974, the National Action Council decided that SIM to be merged with the National Institute for Scientific and Industrial Research (NISIR) to form the Standards and Industrial Research Institute of Malaysia (SIRIM). As a result of this decision, SIRIM was established as a statutory body under the SIRIM (Incorporation) Act 1975 by the Ministry of Science, Technology and the Environment, and came into effect on 15 September 1975. With this merger, SIRIM is better equipped to expand its scope of operations in line with the rapid industrialization in Malaysia.

In view of rapidly changing market needs as a result of the accelerating national industrialization and globalization of markets, there was a need to amend the SIRIM (Incorporation) Act 1975. This will provide necessary flexibility for SIRIM to respond to these changes.

The amendments to the SIRIM (Incorporation) Act, approved by Parliament, came into effect on 24 July 1993.

The amendments allow SIRIM to undertake commercial operations through the formation of joint-venture or wholly owned subsidiaries. Under this amendment, the 24-member SIRIM Council was replaced by a 13-member SIRIM of which six were from the public sector and seven from the private sector. The new SIRIM Board structure enables greater accountability and efficiency, and further strengthen the linkages between SIRIM and the industry.

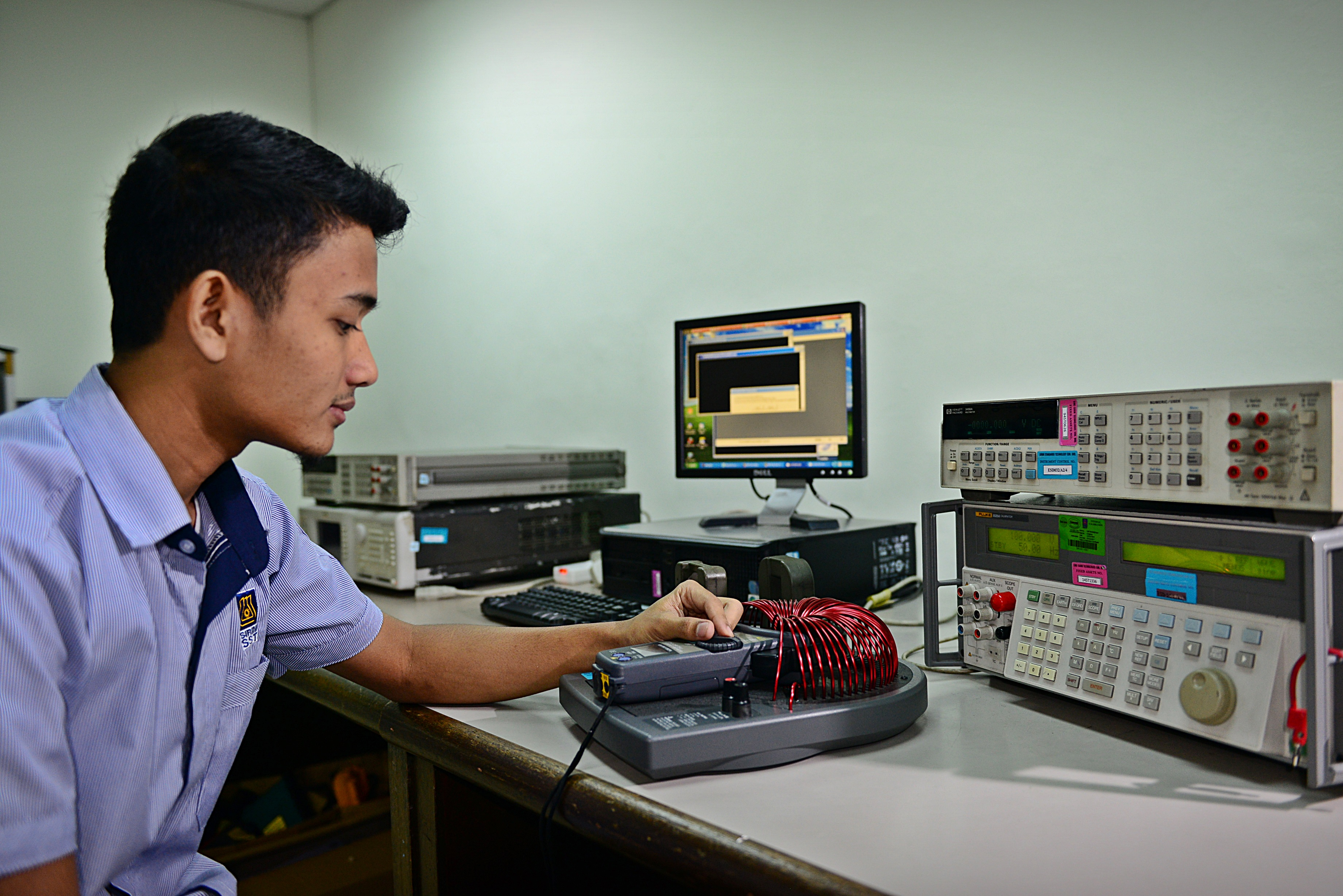
One of SIRIM Berhad's subsidiary, SIRIM Standards Technology (Calibration & Measurement)

On 1 September 1996, SIRIM was corporatized to be known as SIRIM Berhad. SIRIM Berhad was incorporated under the Companies Act, vested with all the rights, privileges and obligations of SIRIM.

== See also ==
- Science and technology in Malaysia
