= Perdana Putra =

Office of the Prime Minister of Malaysia located in Putrajaya

Coordinates: 2°56′18″N 101°41′32″E

- Bangunan Perdana Putra باڠونن ڤردان ڤوترا
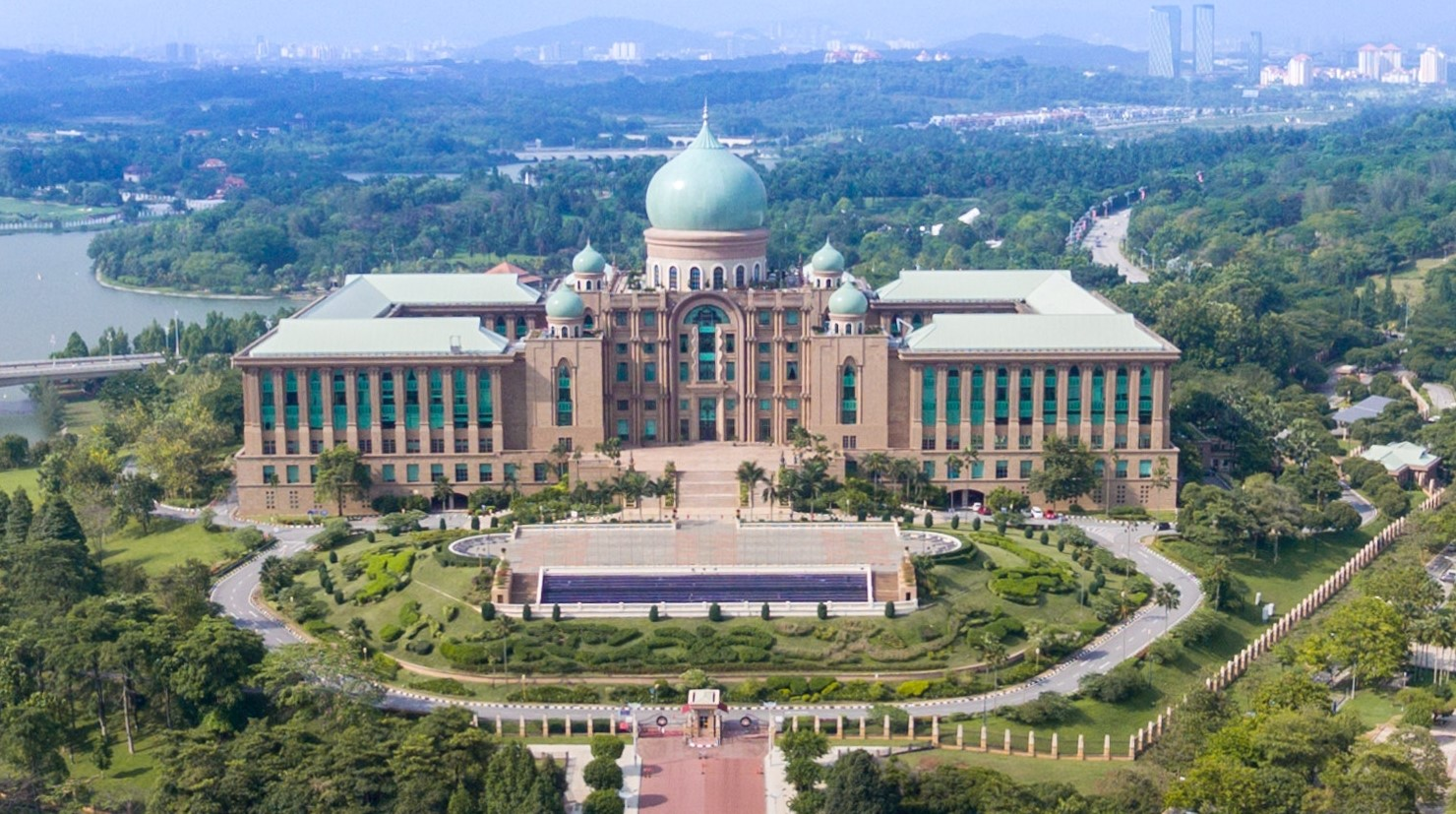
- The Perdana Putra in Putrajaya
- Interactive map of the Perdana Putra area

General information
- Status: Completed
- Type: Federal Government Administrative Centre
- Architectural style: Malay; Islamic; Palladian and Neoclassicism
- Location: Putrajaya, Malaysia
- Groundbreaking: 1995
- Construction started: 1997
- Completed: 1999
- Inaugurated: 1999

Technical details
- Floor count: 5

Design and construction
- Architect: Putrajaya Corporation (PPJ)

The Perdana Putra (Jawi: ڤردان ڤوترا) is a building in Putrajaya, Malaysia which houses the office complex of the Prime Minister of Malaysia. Located on the main hill in Putrajaya, it has become synonymous with the executive branch of the Malaysian federal government.

== History ==
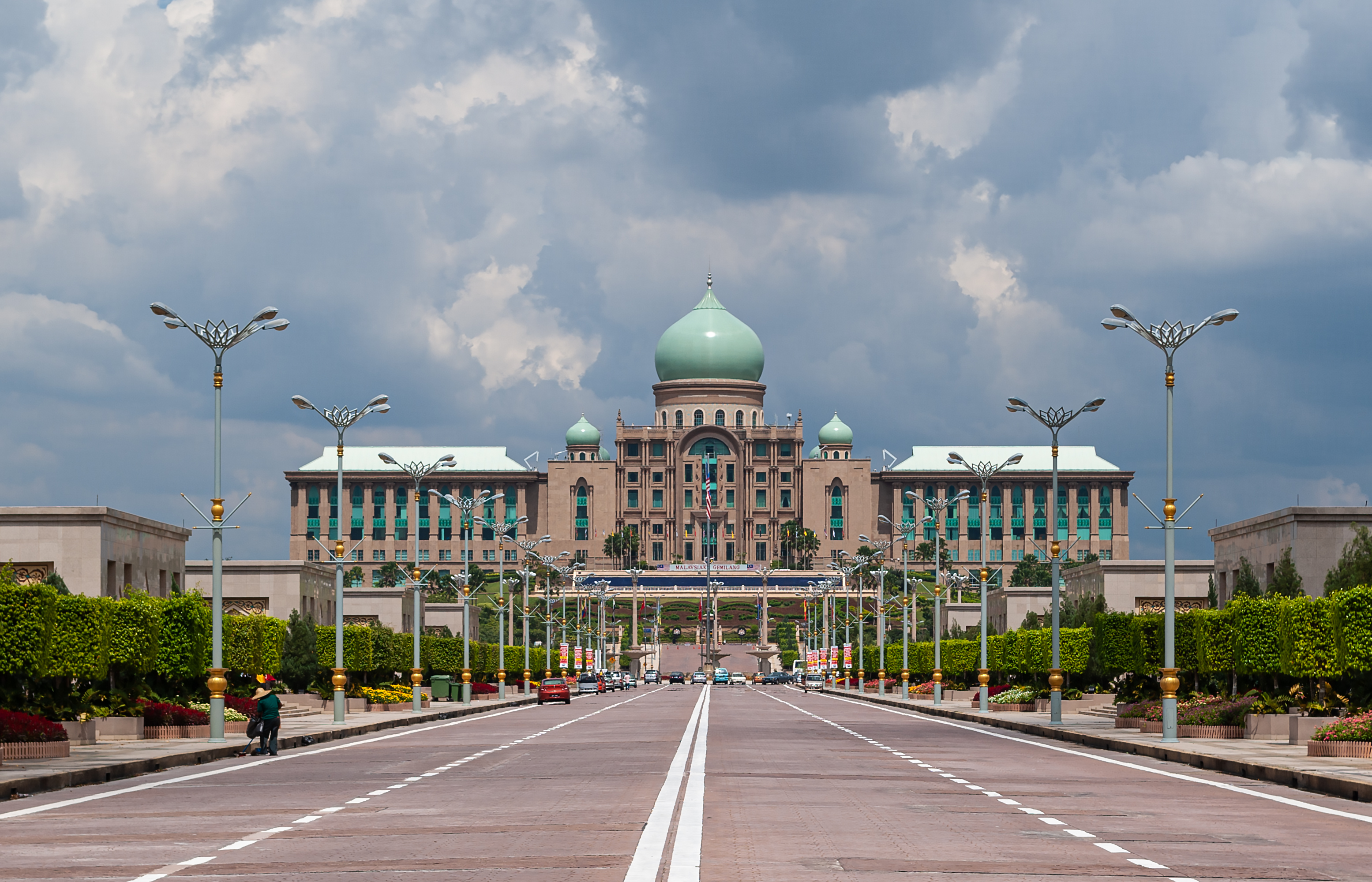
Front view of Perdana Putra

Construction began in 1997 and was completed in early 1999. The building was first occupied in April 1999 after all sections of the Prime Minister's Department moved from Kuala Lumpur to Putrajaya. The former building of the prime minister's office was in Jalan Dato Onn, Kuala Lumpur, where it was transformed into a museum today. The museum is named Memorial Negarawan, commemorating the independence of Malaya, Sabah, and Sarawak.

== Architecture ==
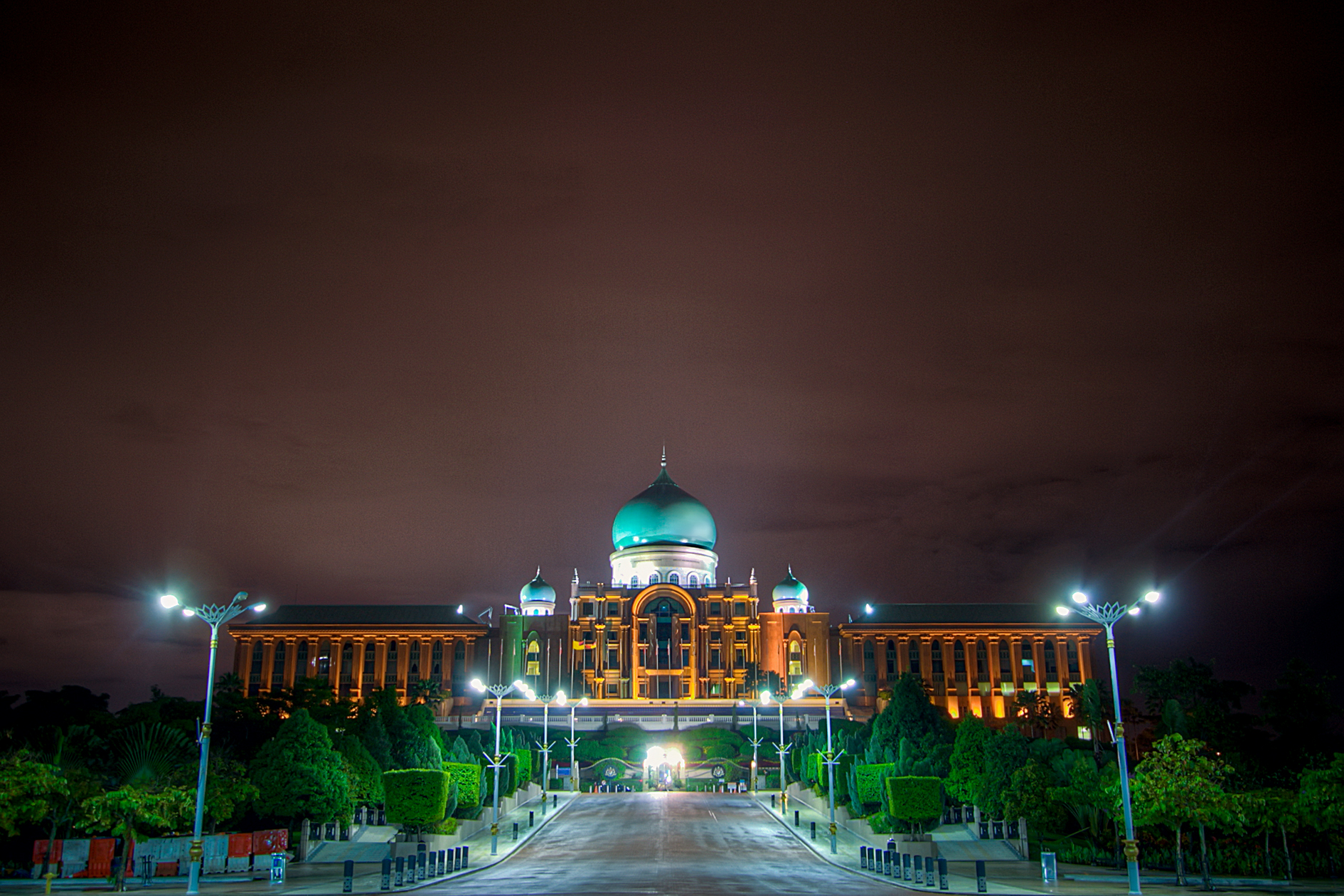
Night View of Perdana Putra

The structural design is influenced by Malay, Islamic and European cultures as such Palladian and Neoclassicism. It was designed by an aQidea Architect (Ahmad Rozi Abd Wahab being the principal architect) with inspiration from the 4th, 7th and former Prime Minister, Mahathir Mohamad.

The column evokes Mogul design and the sphere was a replica of Zahir Mosque dome at Alor Setar.

== Interior of the building ==
These are the main rooms and halls in the interior layout of Perdana Putra.

- Prime Minister's office
- Deputy Prime Minister office
- Small Meeting Hall
- Large Meeting Hall
- View point
- Delegation room
- VIP room
- VIP banquet hall
- National Security Division office
- National Economic Action Council office

== See also ==
- Putrajaya
- Malaysian Houses of Parliament, federal government legislative building in Kuala Lumpur.
