= Government of Malaysia =

Federal Government of Malaysia Kerajaan Persekutuan Malaysia كراجأن ڤرسكوتوان مليسيا
- Coat of arms of Malaysia
- Formation: 16 September 1963; 62 years ago
- Country: Malaysia
- Website: www.malaysia.gov.my

Legislative branch
- Legislature: Parliament
- Meeting place: Houses of Parliament

Executive branch
- Leader: Prime Minister; Anwar Ibrahim
- Appointer: Yang di-Pertuan Agong; Ibrahim Iskandar of Johor
- Headquarters: Perdana Putra
- Main organ: Cabinet

Judicial branch
- Court: Federal Court
- Seat: Palace of Justice

The Government of Malaysia, officially the Federal Government of Malaysia (Malay: Kerajaan Persekutuan Malaysia; Jawi: كراجأن ڤرسكوتوان مليسيا), is based in the Federal Territory of Putrajaya, with the exception of the legislative branch, which is located in Kuala Lumpur. Malaysia is a federation composed of the 11 States of Malaya, the Borneo States of Sabah and Sarawak, and 3 Federal Territories operating within a constitutional monarchy under the Westminster system and is categorised as a representative democracy. The federal government of Malaysia adheres to and is created by the Federal Constitution of Malaysia, the supreme law of the land.

The federal government adopts the principle of separation of powers under Article 127 of the Federal Constitution of Malaysia, and has three branches: the executive, legislature, and judiciary. The state governments in Malaysia also have their respective executive and legislative bodies. The judicial system in Malaysia is a federalised court system operating uniformly throughout the country.

== See also ==
- Politics of Malaysia
- Cabinet of Malaysia
- Prime Minister of Malaysia
- Deputy Prime Minister of Malaysia
- Chief Secretary to the Government of Malaysia
- List of federal ministries and agencies in Malaysia
